= 1985 SASF season =

South Australian Soccer Federation
- Season: 1985

The 1985 South Australian Soccer Federation season was the 79th season of soccer in South Australia.

== 1985 SASF Division One ==
SASF Division One
- Season: 1985
- Champions: Salisbury United (1st title)
- Matches: 132
- Goals: 324 (2.45 per match)

The 1985 South Australian Division One season was the 79th season of first division soccer in South Australia.

Salisbury United were champions for the first time. Cumberland United were relegated. Whyalla City withdrew from SASF competitions after the season. Paul Kitchin was outstanding in defence for Azzurri

=== League Table ===
Pos	Team	Pld	W	D	L	GF	GA	GD	Pts	Qualification or relegation
1	Salisbury United (C)	22	13	6	3	35	17	+18	32	Qualification for NSL Cup and Top Four Cup
2	Eastern Districts Azzurri	22	12	6	4	28	11	+17	30	Qualification for Top Four Cup
3	Beograd Woodville	22	11	7	4	44	24	+20	29	Qualification for Top Four Cup
4	Polonia Adelaide	22	9	8	5	27	21	+6	26	Qualification for Top Four Cup
5	Elizabeth City	22	9	5	8	24	22	+2	23	
6	West Torrens Birkalla	22	8	5	9	24	24	0	21	
7	Para Hills	22	8	4	10	35	38	−3	20	
8	Campbelltown City	22	6	7	9	26	28	−2	19	
9	West Adelaide Hellas	22	8	3	11	24	33	−9	19	
10	Adelaide Croatia	22	5	7	10	18	32	−14	17	
11	Cumberland United (R)	22	4	8	10	24	28	−4	16	Relegation to SASF Division Two
12	Whyalla City	22	3	6	13	15	46	−31	12	Withdrew at end of season

Source: socceraust
Rules for classification: 1) points; 2) goal difference; 3) number of goals scored.
(C) Champions; (R) Relegated

== 1985 SASF Division Two ==
SASF Division Two
- Season: 1985
- Champions: Modbury Jets (1st title)
- Matches: 156
- Goals: 507 (3.25 per match)

The 1985 South Australian Division Two season was the 62nd season of second division soccer in South Australia.

Modbury Jets were champions for the first time, and were promoted with Lion-Grange. Enfield Victoria were relegated to the South Australian Amateur Soccer League.

=== League table ===
Pos	Team	Pld	W	D	L	GF	GA	GD	Pts	Promotion or relegation
1	Modbury Jets (C, P)	24	15	4	5	57	22	+35	34	Promotion to SASF Division One
2	Lion-Grange (P)	24	14	5	5	61	24	+37	33	Promotion to SASF Division One
3	West Fields APAC	24	11	11	2	51	28	+23	33	
4	Noarlunga United	24	14	5	5	48	31	+17	33	
5	Thebarton Asteras	24	13	4	7	39	26	+13	30	
6	Blackwood	24	9	4	11	33	30	+3	22	
7	Windsor Melita	24	10	4	10	38	38	0	22 (Note: Windsor Melita had 2 competition points removed for fielding an ineligible player)	
8	Athelstone	24	7	8	9	32	39	−7	22	
9	Brighton City	24	8	4	12	33	47	−14	20	
10	Adelaide City	24	11	2	11	43	34	+9	18 (Note: Adelaide City had 6 competition points removed for failing to provide match results)	
11	Seaford-Noarlunga	24	4	5	15	24	61	−37	13	
12	Port Adelaide	24	5	2	17	27	66	−39	12	
13	Enfield Victoria (R)	24	6	0	18	21	61	−40	6 (Note: Enfield Victoria had 6 competition points removed for failing to provide match results)	Relegation to South Australian Amateur Soccer League

Source: socceraust
Rules for classification: 1) points; 2) goal difference; 3) number of goals scored.
(C) Champions; (P) Promoted; (R) Relegated

== 1985 Top Four Cup ==
The 1985 Top Four Cup, known as the 1985 Coca-Cola Cup for sponsorship reasons, was the 17th edition of the Top Four Cup, a post-season knockout competition contested by the top four teams from the Division One season.

Polonia Adelaide won the competition for the fourth time, defeating Beograd Woodville 5–0 in the final.

=== Bracket ===
Finals
4	Polonia Adelaide	5
3	Beograd Woodville	0
