= 2017 FFSA season =

Football Federation South Australia
- Season: 2017

The 2017 Football Federation South Australia season was the 111th season of soccer in South Australia, and the fifth under the National Premier Leagues format.

== League tables ==
=== 2017 National Premier Leagues SA ===
NPL South Australia
- Season: 2017
- Champions: Croydon Kings
- Premiers: ~~Adelaide City~~
- Relegated: Cumberland United, Adelaide Blue Eagles
- Matches: 42
- Goals: 144 (3.43 per match)
- Top goalscorer: Anthony Costa (22 goals)
- Biggest home win: Adelaide City 3−0 Para Hills, MetroStars 4−1 Olympic
- Biggest away win: Adelaide United 1−7 Adelaide City, Blue Eagles 0−6 Comets
- Highest scoring: Adelaide United 1−7 Adelaide City

The National Premier League South Australia 2017 season was the fifth edition of the NPL SA as the second level domestic association football competition in South Australia (and third level within Australia overall). 12 teams took part, all playing each other twice for a total of 22 rounds.

==== League Table ====
Pos	Team	Pld	W	D	L	GF	GA	GD	Pts	Qualification or relegation
1	North Eastern MetroStars	22	14	5	3	48	26	+22	47	2017 South Australia Finals
2	Adelaide Comets	22	12	3	7	50	30	+20	39	2017 South Australia Finals
3	Croydon Kings (C)	22	11	3	8	24	24	0	36	2017 South Australia Finals
4	West Adelaide	22	10	4	8	44	39	+5	34	2017 South Australia Finals
5	Para Hills Knights	22	11	0	11	28	36	−8	33	2017 South Australia Finals
6	Adelaide City (Note: Following a sanction by the independent Disciplinary Committee, Adelaide City had 18 competition points removed, resulting in the loss of the League Premiers title.)	22	16	2	4	60	19	+41	32	2017 National Premier Leagues Finals
7	Adelaide Olympic	22	9	3	10	33	42	−9	30	
8	West Torrens Birkalla	22	7	6	9	32	34	−2	27	
9	Campbelltown City	22	7	4	11	33	36	−3	25	
10	Adelaide United Youth	22	7	3	12	31	54	−23	24	
11	Adelaide Blue Eagles (R)	22	5	5	12	33	49	−16	20	Relegation to the 2018 SA State League 1
12	Cumberland United (R)	22	3	2	17	16	43	−27	11	Relegation to the 2018 SA State League 1

Source: sportstg.com
Rules for classification: 1) points; 2) goal difference; 3) number of goals scored.
(C) Champions; (R) Relegated

==== Finals ====
Elimination finals
3	Adelaide Comets	3
6	Para Hills Knights	2
4	Croydon Kings	2
5	West Adelaide	1

Semifinals
1	North Eastern MetroStars	0
2	Adelaide City	1
Adelaide Comets	2
Croydon Kings	4

Preliminary final
North Eastern MetroStars	1
Croydon Kings	2

Grand final
Adelaide City	1
Croydon Kings	2

==== Results ====
Home \ Away	ABE	ACI	ACM	AOL	AUN	CAM	CRO	CUM	NOR	PAR	WEA	WTB
Adelaide Blue Eagles		0–5	0–6	2–0	0–1	2–1	1–1	0–3	1–1	2–3	2–2	6–1
Adelaide City	3–1		2–1	2–1	6–0	2–1	0–3	2–1	0–0	3–0	6–0	1–3
Adelaide Comets	1–0	2–1		5–1	4–2	6–3	0–1	1–1	1–2	4–0	3–3	2–1
Adelaide Olympic	1–2	0–4	2–1		3–0	2–1	1–1	3–2	1–0	1–3	2–4	3–2
Adelaide United Youth	3–3	1–7	2–2	0–3		1–0	2–1	1–1	4–1	1–2	3–1	0–6
Campbelltown City	3–2	1–3	0–1	2–2	3–1		1–0	1–2	2–0	2–3	0–2	2–0
Croydon Kings	3–1	2–1	0–1	3–1	1–2	0–0		1–0	0–3	1–0	0–5	0–2
Cumberland United	0–2	0–2	1–2	1–2	1–0	0–4	0–1		1–2	1–2	0–3	1–3
North Eastern MetroStars	4–2	1–1	2–1	4–1	3–2	3–0	3–1	5–0		3–2	3–2	0–0
Para Hills Knights	3–1	0–2	1–3	1–0	2–1	2–4	0–1	1–0	0–2		1–3	1–0
West Adelaide	2–1	1–2	2–1	2–3	2–1	1–1	0–2	3–0	3–5	0–1		1–1
West Torrens Birkalla	2–2	0–5	3–2	0–0	2–3	1–1	0–1	2–0	1–1	1–0	1–2	

Updated to match(es) played on 09 September 2017. Source:
Legend: Blue = home team win; Yellow = draw; Red = away team win.

==== Leading Goalscorers ====
Rank	Player	Club	Goals
1	Andreas Wiens	Adelaide Comets	12
2	Anthony Costa	Adelaide City	11
3	Thomas Strain	Campbelltown City	8
4	Thomas Briscoe	West Adelaide	7
4	Allan Welsh	Adelaide Comets	7

=== 2017 SA State League 1 ===
SA State League 1
- Season: 2017
- Promoted: South Adelaide, Sturt Lions
- Relegated: Adelaide Hills
- Matches: 42
- Goals: 157 (3.74 per match)
- Top goalscorer: Adam Thurston (15 goals)
- Biggest home win: South Adelaide 10-0 Salisbury United
- Biggest away win: Western Strikers 0-5 Adelaide Hills
- Highest scoring: South Adelaide 10-0 Salisbury United

The 2017 SA State League 1 was the fifth edition of the NPL State League 1 as the second level domestic association football competition in South Australia (and third level within Australia overall). 12 teams competed, all playing each other twice for a total of 22 rounds.

Pos	Team	Pld	W	D	L	GF	GA	GD	Pts	Qualification or relegation
1	South Adelaide (P)	22	15	5	2	53	21	+32	50	Promotion to the 2018 NPL South Australia
2	Western Strikers	22	15	3	4	44	27	+17	48	Qualification to the 2017 SA State League 1 Finals
3	Modbury Jets	22	10	5	7	40	30	+10	35	Qualification to the 2017 SA State League 1 Finals
4	Sturt Lions (P)	22	11	2	9	36	30	+6	35	Promotion to the 2018 NPL South Australia
5	White City	22	9	6	7	40	35	+5	33	Qualification to the 2017 SA State League 1 Finals
6	Adelaide Raiders	22	7	7	8	38	32	+6	28	Qualification to the 2017 SA State League 1 Finals
7	The Cove	22	7	7	8	38	43	−5	28	
8	Noarlunga United	22	7	5	10	35	42	−7	26	
9	Port Adelaide Pirates	22	7	5	10	32	42	−10	26	
10	Salisbury United	22	5	6	11	37	55	−18	21	
11	Adelaide Hills Hawks (R)	22	5	4	13	36	51	−15	19	Relegation to the 2018 SA State League 2
12	Adelaide Victory (R)	22	5	3	14	34	55	−21	18	Relegation to the 2018 SA State League 2

Source: sportstg.com
Rules for classification: 1) points; 2) goal difference; 3) number of goals scored.
(P) Promoted; (R) Relegated

==== Finals ====
Elimination finals
3	South Adelaide	0
6	Western Strikers	2
4
5

Semifinals
1	Western Strikers	1
2	South Adelaide	0
Sturt Lions	2
Adelaide Raiders	1

Preliminary final
South Adelaide	0
Sturt Lions	2

Grand final
Western Strikers	0
Sturt Lions	2

=== 2017 SA State League 2 ===
SA State League 2
- Season: 2017
- Promoted: Seaford Rangers, Fulham United
- Top goalscorer: Sanjin Julardzija (24 goals)
- Biggest home win: Vipers 11-2 UniSA FC
- Biggest away win: UniSA 2-8 Adelaide Cobras
- Highest scoring: Vipers 11-2 UniSA FC

The 2017 SA State League 2 was the second edition of the new NPL State League 2 as the third level domestic association football competition in South Australia (and fourth level within Australia overall). 12 teams competed, all playing each other twice for a total of 22 rounds.

Pos	Team	Pld	W	D	L	GF	GA	GD	Pts	Qualification or relegation
1	Seaford Rangers (P)	22	17	1	4	60	22	+38	52	Promotion to the 2018 SA State League 1
2	Northern Demons	22	16	2	4	61	19	+42	50	Qualification to the 2017 SA State League 2 Finals
3	Fulham United (P)	22	15	3	4	77	27	+50	48	Promotion to the 2018 SA State League 1
4	Adelaide Cobras	22	13	4	5	51	24	+27	43	Qualification to the 2017 SA State League 2 Finals
5	Adelaide Vipers	22	12	3	7	52	29	+23	39	Qualification to the 2017 SA State League 2 Finals
6	Eastern United	22	12	3	7	34	22	+12	39	Qualification to the 2017 SA State League 2 Finals
7	Adelaide University	22	11	2	9	53	45	+8	35	
8	Gawler Eagles	22	9	3	10	47	49	−2	30	
9	Playford City	22	4	4	14	38	62	−24	16	
10	Modbury Vista	22	3	3	16	29	92	−63	12	
11	Mount Barker United	22	2	4	16	22	59	−37	10	
12	University of South Australia	22	1	2	19	20	94	−74	5	

Source: sportstg.com
Rules for classification: 1) points; 2) goal difference; 3) number of goals scored.
(P) Promoted

==== Finals ====
Elimination finals
3	Seaford Rangers	1
6	Northern Demons	0
4
5

Semifinals
1	Northern Demons	2
2	Seaford Rangers	2
Fulham United	2
Adelaide Cobras	1

Preliminary final
Northern Demons	1
Fulham United	5

Grand final
Seaford Rangers (a.e.t.)	2
Fulham United	1

=== 2017 SA Regional Leagues ===
Association	Champions
Collegiate Soccer League	Rostrevor Old Collegians
Limestone Coast Football Association	International Mount Gambier
Port Lincoln Soccer Association	Lincoln Knights
Riverland Soccer Association	Renmark Olympic

=== 2017 Women's NPL ===
PS4 Women's National Premier League
- Season: 2017
- Champions: Adelaide City
- Premiers: West Adelaide

The highest tier domestic football competition in South Australia for women was known for sponsorship reasons as the PS4 Women's National Premier League. This was the second season of the NPL format. The 8 teams played a triple round-robin for a total of 21 games.

Pos	Team	Pld	W	D	L	GF	GA	GD	Pts	Qualification or relegation
1	West Adelaide	21	14	4	3	65	15	+50	46	2017 Women's NPL Finals
2	Metro United	21	14	4	3	66	23	+43	46	2017 Women's NPL Finals
3	Adelaide City (C)	21	14	3	4	91	17	+74	45	2017 Women's NPL Finals
4	Adelaide University	21	14	3	4	82	36	+46	45	2017 Women's NPL Finals
5	Fulham United	21	9	2	10	52	58	−6	29	
6	Salisbury Inter	21	4	4	13	23	65	−42	16	
7	Cumberland United	21	4	2	15	32	47	−15	14	
8	Campbelltown City	21	0	0	21	6	156	−150	0	

Source: sportstg.com
Rules for classification: 1) points; 2) goal difference; 3) number of goals scored.
(C) Champions

Semi-finals
1	West Adelaide (a.e.t.)	4
2	Metro United	3
3	Adelaide City	3
4	Adelaide University	2

Elimination Final
2	Metro United	1
3	Adelaide City	2

Grand Final; 9 September
1	West Adelaide	1
3	Adelaide City	4

== Cup Competitions ==
=== 2017 Federation Cup ===
South Australian soccer clubs competed in 2017 for the Federation Cup. Clubs entered from the NPL SA, the State League 1, State League 2, South Australian Amateur Soccer League and South Australian Collegiate Soccer League.

This knockout competition was won by North Eastern MetroStars.

The competition also served as the South Australian Preliminary rounds for the 2017 FFA Cup. In addition to the MetroStars, the A-League club Adelaide United qualified for the final rounds, entering at the Round of 32.
