= 1988 SASF season =

South Australian Soccer Federation
- Season: 1988

The 1988 South Australian Soccer Federation season was the 82nd season of soccer in South Australia.

== 1988 SASF Division One ==
SASF Division One
- Season: 1988
- Champions: Adelaide Croatia (3rd title)
- Matches played: 132
- Goals scored: 343 (2.6 per match)

The 1988 South Australian Division One season was the 82nd season of first division soccer in South Australia.

Adelaide Croatia were champions for the third time. Cumberland United and Beograd Woodville were relegated.

=== League Table ===
Pos	Team	Pld	W	D	L	GF	GA	GD	Pts	Qualification or relegation
1	Adelaide Croatia (C)	22	15	5	2	40	12	+28	35	Qualification for Top Four Cup
2	West Adelaide Hellas	22	16	1	5	55	26	+29	33	Qualification for Top Four Cup
3	West Torrens Birkalla	22	11	3	8	20	22	−2	25	Qualification for Top Four Cup
4	Salisbury United	22	8	8	6	24	20	+4	24	Qualification for Top Four Cup
5	Campbelltown City	22	9	6	7	26	29	−3	24	
6	Adelaide City	22	9	4	9	27	28	−1	22	
7	Polonia Adelaide	22	9	3	10	34	27	+7	21	
8	Para Hills	22	6	8	8	23	30	−7	20	
9	Modbury Jets	22	5	7	10	24	30	−6	17	
10	Lion-Grange	22	5	7	10	31	41	−10	17	
11	Cumberland United (R)	22	5	5	12	24	36	−12	15	Relegation to SASF Division Two
12	Beograd Woodville (R)	22	3	5	14	15	42	−27	11	Relegation to SASF Division Two

Source: socceraust
Rules for classification: 1) points; 2) goal difference; 3) number of goals scored.
(C) Champions; (R) Relegated

== 1988 SASF Division Two ==
SASF Division Two
- Season: 1988
- Champions: Port Adelaide (5th title)
- Matches played: 90
- Goals scored: 228 (2.53 per match)

The 1988 South Australian Division Two season was the 65th season of second division soccer in South Australia.

Port Adelaide were champions for the fifth time, and were promoted with Eastern Districts Azzurri. Brighton City were relegated to the South Australian Amateur Soccer League.

=== League Table ===
Pos	Team	Pld	W	D	L	GF	GA	GD	Pts	Promotion or relegation
1	Port Adelaide (C, P)	18	12	3	3	32	18	+14	27	Promotion to SASF Division One
2	Eastern Districts Azzurri (P)	18	11	3	4	38	10	+28	25	Promotion to SASF Division One
3	Elizabeth City	18	11	3	4	36	22	+14	25	
4	Blackwood	18	7	7	4	23	10	+13	21	
5	Enfield City Falcons	18	6	6	6	17	19	−2	18	
6	Seaford Rangers	18	7	2	9	22	26	−4	16	
7	Central Districts APAC	18	6	3	9	20	25	−5	15	
8	Noarlunga United	18	6	2	10	19	30	−11	14	
9	Thebarton Asteras	18	3	5	10	11	30	−19	11	
10	Brighton City (R)	18	3	2	13	10	38	−28	8	Relegation to South Australian Amateur Soccer League

Source: socceraust
Rules for classification: 1) points; 2) goal difference; 3) number of goals scored.
(C) Champions; (P) Promoted; (R) Relegated

== 1988 Top Four Cup ==
The 1988 Top Four Cup, known as the 1988 Coca-Cola Cup for sponsorship reasons, was the 20th edition of the Top Four Cup, a post-season knockout competition contested by the top four teams from the Division One season.

West Adelaide Hellas won the competition for the seventh time, and a third in a row, defeating Adelaide Croatia in the final.

=== Bracket ===
Semifinals
1	Adelaide Croatia
4	Salisbury United
2	West Adelaide Hellas
3	West Torrens Birkalla

Finals
1	Adelaide Croatia
2	West Adelaide Hellas (p)
