= 2016 FFSA season =

Football Federation South Australia
- Season: 2016

The 2016 Football Federation South Australia season was the 110th season of soccer in South Australia, and the fourth under the National Premier Leagues format.

== League tables ==
=== 2016 National Premier Leagues SA ===
NPL South Australia
- Season: 2016
- Champions: Campbelltown City
- Premiers: Adelaide City
- Relegated: South Adelaide; Adelaide Raiders
- Matches: 84
- Goals: 312 (3.71 per match)
- Top goalscorer: Anthony Costa (15 goals)
- Biggest home win: Adelaide City 6−0 Adelaide United
- Biggest away win: MetroStars 1−5 Adelaide Blue Eagles
- Highest scoring: Adelaide City 7−4 Adelaide Raiders

The National Premier League South Australia 2016 season was played over 22 rounds, with the number of teams in the competition reduced to 12 teams.

==== League Table ====
Pos	Team	Pld	W	D	L	GF	GA	GD	Pts	Qualification or relegation
1	Adelaide City	22	17	2	3	62	27	+35	53	2016 National Premier Leagues Finals
2	Campbelltown City (C)	22	15	4	3	45	19	+26	49	2016 South Australia Finals
3	West Torrens Birkalla	22	12	4	6	42	24	+18	40	2016 South Australia Finals
4	Adelaide Blue Eagles	22	11	4	7	51	34	+17	37	2016 South Australia Finals
5	Adelaide Comets	22	11	3	8	41	39	+2	36	2016 South Australia Finals
6	North Eastern MetroStars	22	11	2	9	39	34	+5	35	2016 South Australia Finals
7	West Adelaide	22	8	6	8	34	33	+1	30	
8	Croydon Kings	22	7	3	12	34	42	−8	24	
9	Adelaide United Youth (Note: Adelaide United Youth cannot qualify for the National Premier Leagues finals series.)	22	7	1	14	25	43	−18	22	
10	Adelaide Olympic	22	6	4	12	38	60	−22	22	
11	South Adelaide (R)	22	6	1	15	31	52	−21	19	Relegation to the 2017 SA State League 1
12	Adelaide Raiders (R)	22	4	0	18	25	60	−35	12	Relegation to the 2017 SA State League 1

Source: foxsportspulse.com
Rules for classification: 1) points; 2) goal difference; 3) number of goals scored.
(C) Champions; (R) Relegated

==== Finals ====
Elimination finals
3	West Torrens Birkalla	1
6	North Eastern MetroStars	0
4	Adelaide Blue Eagles	3
5	Adelaide Comets	2

Semifinals
1	Campbelltown City	0
2	Adelaide City	2
West Torrens Birkalla	2
Adelaide Blue Eagles	1

Preliminary final
Campbelltown City	4
West Torrens Birkalla	0

Grand final
Adelaide City	0
Campbelltown City	1

==== Results ====
Home \ Away	ABE	ACI	ACM	ARA	AOL	AUN	CAM	CRO	NOR	SOU	WEA	WTB
Adelaide Blue Eagles		1–3		4–1	4–0	2–1		1–2		6–3		0–2
Adelaide City				7–4	4–1	6–0	4–3	4–2	3–0		1–0	
Adelaide Comets	1–1	2–1			3–1			3–2	1–4	3–2	0–1	
Adelaide Raiders			3–2			2–0		1–4	0–1	3–1	1–4	0–1
Adelaide Olympic	4–5	3–3		3–0		0–2	1–1			4–3	3–3	0–3
Adelaide United Youth	2–0		0–3				1–2		2–2	1–3	2–1	1–3
Campbelltown City	1–0		3–1	4–1				1–2	2–1	5–0		1–0
Croydon Kings		0–1	2–3	5–2	2–4	1–1			2–2			1–1
North Eastern MetroStars	1–5		2–3	1–0	1–2		1–2			4–2	2–0	
South Adelaide		0–3		4–1		1–2	1–3	2–0				2–0
West Adelaide	2–2	1–2	0–0		4–1		0–0	3–2		2–2		
West Torrens Birkalla	2–2	3–1	4–0			2–0	0–2		2–0		0–0	

Updated to match(es) played on 13 June 2016. Source:
Legend: Blue = home team win; Yellow = draw; Red = away team win.

==== Leading Goalscorers ====
Rank	Player	Club	Goals
1	(Australia) Anthony Costa	Adelaide City	15
2	(Australia) Yvan Boyokino	Adelaide Blue Eagles	12
3	(Australia) Nikola Mileusnic	Adelaide City	11
4	(Australia) Fausto Erba	Adelaide Olympic	10
4	(Australia) Jonathon Rideout	South Adelaide	10
6	(Australia) Nicholas Bucco	Adelaide City	7
6	(Australia) Doni Pollock	MetroStars	7
6	(Australia) Thomas Strain	Campbelltown City	7
6	(Australia) Rocco Visconte	Croydon Kings	7
10	(Australia) Anthony Dimas	Adelaide Blue Eagles	6
10	(Australia) Taro Kawamura	West Torrens Birkalla	6
10	(Australia) Adam Piscioneri	Campbelltown City	6
10	(Australia) Daniel Sullivan	South Adelaide	6
10	(Australia) Fumiya Suzuki	West Torrens Birkalla	6

=== 2016 NPL State League 1 ===
NPL State League 1
- Season: 2016
- Promoted: Cumberland United; Para Hills Knights
- Relegated: Adelaide Hills; Playford City
- Matches: 84
- Goals: 271 (3.23 per match)
- Top goalscorer: Callum Flanagan (11 goals)
- Biggest home win: Cumberland United 6−1 White City
- Biggest away win: Adelaide Victory 1−5 White City; Playford 1−5 Cove
- Highest scoring: Cumberland United 6−1 White City; Cumberland United 5−2 Salisbury; Sturt 5−2 Cove; Para Hills 2−5 Adelaide Victory

The 2016 NPL State League 1 was the fourth edition of the NPL State League 1, the second level domestic association football competition in South Australia (and third level within Australia overall). 12 teams competed, playing each other twice for a total of 22 rounds.

Pos	Team	Pld	W	D	L	GF	GA	GD	Pts	Qualification or relegation
1	Cumberland United (P)	22	15	3	4	61	24	+37	48	Promotion to the 2017 National Premier Leagues South Australia
2	Para Hills Knights (P)	22	13	4	5	33	27	+6	43	Promotion to the 2017 National Premier Leagues South Australia
3	White City	22	12	4	6	46	29	+17	40	
4	Sturt Lions	22	12	3	7	41	27	+14	39	
5	The Cove	22	12	3	7	39	29	+10	39	
6	Modbury Jets	22	9	5	8	33	35	−2	32	
7	Adelaide Victory	22	9	3	10	40	43	−3	30	
8	Salisbury United	22	7	7	8	26	30	−4	28	
9	Western Strikers	22	8	3	11	30	36	−6	27	
10	Port Adelaide Pirates	22	6	6	10	29	31	−2	24	
11	Adelaide Hills Hawks	22	4	5	13	32	51	−19	17	Qualification to the 2016 relegation play-offs
12	Playford City (R)	22	1	2	19	21	69	−48	5	Relegation to the 2017 NPL State League 2

Source: foxsportspulse.com
Rules for classification: 1) points; 2) goal difference; 3) number of goals scored.
(P) Promoted; (R) Relegated

=== 2016 NPL State League 2 ===
NPL State League 2
- Season: 2016
- Promoted: Noarlunga United; Gawler SC
- Matches: 36
- Goals: 145 (4.03 per match)
- Top goalscorer: Jaylan Capurso, Kindilon Maclean (6 goals)
- Biggest home win: Adelaide Vipers 6−0 Mount Barker United
- Biggest away win: Mount Barker United 1−5 Cobras; Eastern United 2−6 Cobras; Eastern United 0−4 Noarlunga
- Highest scoring: Seaford Rangers 7−4 Eastern United

The 2016 NPL State League 2 was the first edition of the new NPL State League 2 as the third level domestic association football competition in South Australia (and fourth level within Australia overall). 9 teams took part, all playing each other twice for a total of 16 matches. New teams included SAASL teams Fulham United and Adelaide Vipers and also Collegiate Soccer League team Mount Barker United.

Pos	Team	Pld	W	D	L	GF	GA	GD	Pts	Qualification or relegation
1	Noarlunga United (P)	16	12	2	2	39	13	+26	38	Promotion to the 2017 NPL State League 1
2	Gawler Eagles	16	10	2	4	43	27	+16	32	Qualification to the 2016 promotion play-offs
3	Seaford Rangers	16	8	6	2	35	21	+14	30	
4	Adelaide Cobras	16	7	5	4	36	19	+17	26	
5	Fulham United	16	6	6	4	28	22	+6	24	
6	Adelaide Vipers	16	6	1	9	26	31	−5	19	
7	Northern Demons	16	5	3	8	29	31	−2	18	
8	Eastern United	16	3	1	12	24	58	−34	10	
9	Mount Barker United	16	2	0	14	16	54	−38	6	

Source: foxsportspulse.com
Rules for classification: 1) points; 2) goal difference; 3) number of goals scored.
(P) Promoted

=== 2016 SA Regional Leagues ===
Association	Champions
Collegiate Soccer League	Adelaide Uni Grads Red
Limestone Coast Football Association	Gambier Centrals
Port Lincoln Soccer Association	Sekol Masters
Riverland Soccer Association	Renmark Olympic

=== 2016 Women's NPL ===
PS4 Women's National Premier League
- Season: 2016
- Champions: Metro United
- Premiers: Metro United

The highest tier domestic football competition in South Australia for women was known for sponsorship reasons as the PS4 Women's National Premier League. This was the inaugural season of a new NPL format. The 8 teams played a triple round-robin for a total of 21 games.

Pos	Team	Pld	W	D	L	GF	GA	GD	Pts	Qualification or relegation
1	Metro United (C)	21	17	3	1	53	15	+38	54	2017 Women's NPL Finals
2	Adelaide City	21	15	2	4	51	15	+36	47	2017 Women's NPL Finals
3	Fulham United	21	11	1	9	29	33	−4	34	2017 Women's NPL Finals
4	Adelaide University	21	10	4	7	69	52	+17	34	2017 Women's NPL Finals
5	West Adelaide	21	9	5	7	37	31	+6	32	
6	Sturt Marion	21	7	2	12	32	52	−20	23	
7	Cumberland United	21	3	3	15	16	54	−38	12	Qualification to the 2016 relegation play-offs
8	Para Hills Knights (R)	21	1	2	18	16	51	−35	5	Relegation to the 2018 Women's State League 1

Source: sportstg.com
Rules for classification: 1) points; 2) goal difference; 3) number of goals scored.
(C) Champions; (R) Relegated

==== Finals ====
Semi-finals
1	Metro United	1
2	Adelaide City	0
3	Fulham United	3
4	Adelaide University	1

Elimination Final
2	Adelaide City	1 (5)
3	Fulham United	1 (4)

Grand Final; 9 September
1	Metro United	4
2	Adelaide City	0

==== Promotion/relegation play-off ====
9 September 2016

Cumberland United	1–0	Campbelltown City

18 September 2016

Campbelltown City	1–4	Cumberland United

== Cup competitions ==
=== 2016 Federation Cup ===
South Australian soccer clubs competed in 2016 for the Federation Cup. Clubs entered from the NPL SA, the State League 1, State League 2, South Australian Amateur Soccer League and South Australian Collegiate Soccer League.

This knockout competition was won by North Eastern MetroStars.

The competition also served as the South Australian Preliminary rounds for the 2016 FFA Cup. In addition to the MetroStars, the A-League club Adelaide United qualified for the final rounds, entering at the Round of 32.
