= 2019 FFSA season =

Football South Australia
- Season: 2019

The 2019 Football Federation South Australia season was the 113th season of soccer in South Australia, and the seventh under the National Premier Leagues format.

== 2019 National Premier Leagues South Australia ==
(South Australia) National Premier Leagues
- Season: 2019
- Champions: Campbelltown City
- Premiers: Campbelltown City
- Matches: 132
- Goals: 414 (3.14 per match)
- Top goalscorer: Christos Pounendis (19 goals)

The 2019 National Premier Leagues South Australia season was played over 22 rounds, beginning on 22 February with the regular season concluding on 17 August.

=== League table ===
Pos	Team	Pld	W	D	L	GF	GA	GD	Pts	Qualification or relegation
1	Campbelltown City (C)	22	13	4	5	51	32	+19	43	Qualification for National Premier Leagues Finals
2	Adelaide Comets	22	11	5	6	43	26	+17	38	Qualification for Finals
3	Adelaide Raiders	22	11	3	8	44	35	+9	36	Qualification for Finals
4	Adelaide Olympic	22	9	8	5	39	32	+7	35	Qualification for Finals
5	Adelaide Blue Eagles	22	10	5	7	33	33	0	35	Qualification for Finals
6	North Eastern MetroStars	22	10	4	8	46	31	+15	34	Qualification for Finals
7	Croydon Kings	22	8	9	5	33	25	+8	33	
8	Adelaide United Youth (Note: Adelaide United Youth cannot qualify for the National Premier Leagues finals series.)	22	8	6	8	38	33	+5	30	
9	Para Hills Knights	22	7	7	8	31	34	−3	28	
10	Adelaide City	22	5	9	8	29	42	−13	18 (Note: Following a sanction by the independent Disciplinary Committee, Adelaide City had 18 competition points removed for the 2018 season, and a further 6 points for the 2019 season.)	
11	West Adelaide (R)	22	3	7	12	25	48	−23	16	Relegation to SA State League 1
12	South Adelaide (R)	22	1	5	16	24	65	−41	8	Relegation to SA State League 1

Source: mygameday
Rules for classification: 1) points; 2) goal difference; 3) number of goals scored.
(C) Champions; (R) Relegated

=== Matches ===
Home \ Away	ABE	ACI	ACO	ADO	ADR	ADL	CAM	CRO	NMS	PHK	STH	WST
Adelaide Blue Eagles		3–3	2–1	0–4	1–0		0–2	2–1	0–2	3–1	4–0	1–1
Adelaide City	1–1		1–2	3–1	3–2	2–0	2–2	0–4	1–0	1–2	1–0	0–0
Adelaide Comets	2–1	5–0		1–2	6–0	2–1	4–1	0–2	1–4	1–1	6–0	
Adelaide Olympic	1–3	1–1	2–0		1–2	1–1	2–1	1–0	3–1	2–2	3–2	1–1
Adelaide Raiders	1–3	2–2	0–2	1–1		0–2	2–5	5–1	0–1	2–1	4–0	4–1
Adelaide United Youth	0–1	2–2	1–3	2–0	1–3		3–4	1–1	3–2	3–0	1–1	4–2
Campbelltown City	2–3	3–3	3–0	4–1	0–1	1–2		2–1	2–0	3–1	5–1	1–0
Croydon Knights	1–0	2–0	0–0	1–1	1–1	2–1	2–3		1–1	0–0	3–3	1–0
North Eastern MetroStars	5–0	4–2	1–1	1–2	0–2	1–1	1–2	1–4		4–1	3–3	4–1
Para Hills Knights	2–1	2–0	0–0	3–3	0–2	0–3	0–0	1–1	1–2		4–1	2–1
South Adelaide	0–1	1–1	2–3	1–5	1–3	3–1	2–4	1–1	0–4	0–2		1–2
West Adelaide	1–1	3–0	1–1	1–1	2–7	0–3	1–1	1–3	0–4	1–5	4–1	

Updated to match(es) played on unknown. Source:
Legend: Blue = home team win; Yellow = draw; Red = away team win.

=== Finals ===
Elimination finals
3	Adelaide Raiders	0
6	North Eastern MetroStars	4
4	Adelaide Olympic	2
5	Adelaide Blue Eagles	0

Semifinals
1	Campbelltown City	0
2	Adelaide Comets	1
Adelaide Olympic	1
North Eastern MetroStars	2

Preliminary final
Adelaide Comets	4
North Eastern MetroStars	0

Grand final
Campbelltown City	3
Adelaide Comets	0

=== Top Goalscorers ===
As of 17 August 2019

Rank	Player	Club	Goals
1	(Australia) Christos Pounendis	Adelaide Olympic	19
2	(Australia) Terence Carter	Adelaide Raiders	17
3	(Australia) Andreas Wiens	Adelaide Comets	12
4	(Australia) Luigi Ditroia	Campbelltown City	11
5	(Australia) Christian Esposito	North Eastern MetroStars	10
5	(Italy) Emanuele Testardi	Adelaide Blue Eagles	10
5	(Australia) Nathan Munro	Croydon Kings	10
5	(Australia) Yohei Matsumoto	Campbelltown City	10

== 2019 State League 1 South Australia ==
(South Australia) State League 1
- Season: 2019
- Champions: Cumberland United
- Premiers: Modbury Jets
- Promoted: Cumberland United, Modbury Jets
- Matches: 132
- Top goalscorer: Joshua Farrell (16 goals)

Promotion to the 2020 NPL was awarded to the Premiers (highest placed team during the regular season), as well as the Champions (winner of the Grand Final).

=== League table ===
Pos	Team	Pld	W	D	L	GF	GA	GD	Pts	Promotion, qualification or relegation
1	Modbury Jets (P)	22	17	4	1	56	15	+41	55	Promotion to National Premier Leagues SA
2	Sturt Lions	22	12	7	3	41	21	+20	43	Qualification for Finals
3	White City	22	13	4	5	42	25	+17	43	Qualification for Finals
4	Cumberland United (P)	22	11	1	10	40	30	+10	34	Qualification for Finals
5	West Torrens Birkalla	22	10	4	8	30	27	+3	34	Qualification for Finals
6	Western Strikers	22	9	6	7	40	31	+9	33	Qualification for Finals
7	Fulham United	22	9	4	9	35	34	+1	31	
8	Seaford Rangers	22	9	3	10	42	47	−5	30	
9	Playford City Patriots	22	8	5	9	39	43	−4	29	
10	Adelaide Victory	22	6	4	12	28	43	−15	22	
11	Noarlunga United (R)	22	3	4	15	20	58	−38	13	Relegation to SA State League 2
12	Salisbury United (R)	22	0	4	18	20	59	−39	4	Relegation to SA State League 2

Source: sportstg.com
Rules for classification: 1) points; 2) goal difference; 3) number of goals scored.
(P) Promoted; (R) Relegated

=== Finals ===
Elimination finals
3	Modbury Jets	1
6	Sturt Lions	0
4
5

Semifinals
1	Sturt Lions	1
2	Modbury Jets	1
Cumberland United	2
Western Strikers	1

Preliminary final
Sturt Lions	2
Cumberland United	3

Grand final
Modbury Jets	1
Cumberland United	2

=== Top Goalscorers ===
As of 17 August 2019

Rank	Player	Club	Goals
1	(Australia) Joshua Farrell	Modbury Jets	16
1	(Australia) Shaun McGreevy	Modbury Jets	16
3	(Australia) Jonathon Rideout	Seaford Rangers	15
4	(Australia) Dylan D'Agostino	Western Strikers	13
5	(Australia) Jordan Pegorano	Cumberland United	10
5	(Australia) Kegan Osborne	Playford City Patriots	10

== 2019 South Australian State League 2 ==
(South Australia) State League 2
- Season: 2019
- Champions: Adelaide Hills
- Premiers: Adelaide Hills
- Promoted: Adelaide Hills, Adelaide Vipers

Promotion to the 2020 State League 1 was awarded to the Premiers (highest placed team during the regular season), as well as the Champions (winner of the Grand Final).

=== League table ===
Pos	Team	Pld	W	D	L	GF	GA	GD	Pts	Qualification or relegation
1	Adelaide Hills (P)	22	16	4	2	76	25	+51	52	Promoted to the 2020 South Australian State League 1
2	Gawler	22	14	2	6	53	33	+20	44	2019 South Australian State League 2 Finals
3	Port Adelaide	22	11	5	6	50	27	+23	38	2019 South Australian State League 2 Finals
4	Adelaide Vipers (P)	22	12	2	8	53	36	+17	38	Promoted to the 2020 South Australian State League 1
5	Northern Demons	22	11	4	7	45	30	+15	37	2019 South Australian State League 2 Finals
6	Adelaide Cobras	22	11	4	7	41	33	+8	37	2019 South Australian State League 2 Finals
7	Eastern United	22	11	4	7	33	26	+7	37	
8	The Cove	22	10	5	7	44	35	+9	35	
9	Adelaide University	22	6	4	12	38	43	−5	22	
10	University of South Australia (R)	22	5	2	15	23	63	−40	17	Relegated to Collegiate League 1
11	Modbury Vista	22	2	4	16	22	61	−39	10	
12	Mount Barker United	22	1	4	17	23	89	−66	7	

Source: sportstg.com
Rules for classification: 1) points; 2) goal difference; 3) number of goals scored.
(P) Promoted; (R) Relegated

=== Finals ===
Elimination finals
3	Adelaide Hills	0
6	Gawler	0
4
5

Semifinals
1	Gawler	1
2	Adelaide Hills	2
Adelaide Vipers	2
Adelaide Cobras	0

Preliminary final
Gawler	0
Adelaide Vipers	3

Grand final
Adelaide Hills (a.e.t.)	3
Adelaide Vipers	1

=== Top Goalscorers ===
As of 17 August 2019

Rank	Player	Club	Goals
1	(Australia) Iradi Baragomwa	Gawler	23
2	(Australia) Daniel Hosking	Adelaide Hills	22
3	(Australia) Nicholas Stefanopoulos	Adelaide Vipers	16
4	(Australia) Andrew Orphanou	Adelaide Cobras	15
4	(Australia) Callum Hutchins	Adelaide Hills	15
6	(Australia) Lewis Farquhar	Adelaide Hills	14

== 2019 Women's NPL ==
PS4 Women's National Premier League
- Season: 2019
- Champions: Adelaide City
- Premiers: Adelaide City

The highest tier domestic football competition in South Australia for women was known for sponsorship reasons as the PS4 Women's National Premier League. This was the fourth season of the NPL format. The 8 teams played a triple round-robin for a total of 21 games.

Pos	Team	Pld	W	D	L	GF	GA	GD	Pts	Qualification or relegation
1	Adelaide City (C)	21	18	1	2	101	21	+80	55	2019 Women's NPL Finals
2	West Adelaide	21	15	1	5	43	19	+24	46	2019 Women's NPL Finals
3	Salisbury Inter	21	11	2	8	43	53	−10	35	2019 Women's NPL Finals
4	Adelaide University	21	9	5	7	28	27	+1	32	2019 Women's NPL Finals
5	Metro United	21	8	3	10	37	46	−9	27	
6	Fulham United	21	5	4	12	28	62	−34	19	
7	Adelaide Comets	21	2	7	12	21	41	−20	13	
8	FFSA NTC	21	3	3	15	27	59	−32	12	

Source: sportstg.com
Rules for classification: 1) points; 2) goal difference; 3) number of goals scored.
(C) Champions

Semi-finals
1	Adelaide City	0
2	West Adelaide	1
3	Salisbury Inter	2
4	Adelaide University	1

Elimination Final
2	Adelaide City	5
3	Salisbury Inter	1

Grand Final; 9 September
2	West Adelaide	1
1	Adelaide City	2

== Cup competitions ==
=== 2019 Federation Cup ===
South Australian soccer clubs competed in 2019 for the Federation Cup. Clubs entered from the NPL SA, the State League 1, State League 2, South Australian Amateur Soccer League and South Australian Collegiate Soccer League.

This knockout competition was won by Adelaide Olympic.

The competition also served as the South Australian preliminary rounds for the 2019 FFA Cup. In addition to Adelaide Olympic, A-League club Adelaide United qualified for the final rounds, entering at the Round of 32.
