= 2015 FFSA season =

Football Federation South Australia
- Season: 2015
- Champions: West Adelaide

The 2015 Football Federation South Australia season was the 109th season of soccer in South Australia, and the third under the National Premier Leagues format.

== League tables ==
=== 2015 National Premier Leagues SA ===
NPL South Australia
- Season: 2015
- Champions: West Adelaide
- Premiers: West Adelaide
- Relegated: Port Adelaide Pirates, Modbury Jets, White City, Para Hills Knights
- Matches: 182
- Goals: 611 (3.36 per match)
- Top goalscorer: Michael Matricciani (22 goals)
- Biggest home win: Adelaide Blue Eagles 6−0 Modbury Jets (19 February 2015); West Adelaide 7−1 Modbury Jets (18 April 2015)
- Biggest away win: Adelaide Comets 1−8 Adelaide City (11 April 2015)
- Highest scoring: 9 goals Adelaide Comets 1−8 Adelaide City (11 April 2015)

The National Premier League South Australia 2015 season was played over 26 rounds, from February to August 2015.

==== League Table ====
Pos	Team	Pld	W	D	L	GF	GA	GD	Pts	Qualification or relegation
1	West Adelaide (C)	26	14	9	3	52	26	+26	51	2015 National Premier Leagues Finals
2	Adelaide Blue Eagles	26	14	8	4	55	28	+27	50	2015 South Australia Finals
3	West Torrens Birkalla	26	15	4	7	57	40	+17	49	2015 South Australia Finals
4	Croydon Kings	26	14	6	6	49	38	+11	48	2015 South Australia Finals
5	Adelaide City	26	14	4	8	69	39	+30	46	2015 South Australia Finals
6	Campbelltown City	26	13	7	6	44	36	+8	46	2015 South Australia Finals
7	North Eastern MetroStars	26	11	6	9	44	37	+7	39	
8	Adelaide Comets	26	11	1	14	34	49	−15	34	
9	South Adelaide	26	8	6	12	42	56	−14	30	
10	Adelaide Raiders	26	8	3	15	43	45	−2	27	
11	Port Adelaide Pirates (R)	26	7	6	13	37	56	−19	27	Qualification to the 2015 relegation play-offs
12	Modbury Jets (R)	26	7	6	13	29	55	−26	27	Relegation to the 2016 SA State League 1
13	White City (R)	26	2	11	13	26	48	−22	17	Relegation to the 2016 SA State League 1
14	Para Hills Knights (R)	26	3	5	18	30	56	−26	14	Relegation to the 2016 SA State League 1

Source: foxsportspulse.com
Rules for classification: 1) points; 2) goal difference; 3) number of goals scored.
(C) Champions; (R) Relegated

==== Results ====
Home \ Away	ABE	ACI	ACM	ARA	CAM	CRO	MOD	NOR	PAR	PAP	SOU	WEA	WTB	WHI
Adelaide Blue Eagles		1–1	2–0	2–0	1–2	1–4	6–0	1–0	4–2	5–2	2–0	0–0	4–0	1–1
Adelaide City	1–4		0–1	2–1	4–0	6–1	1–3	1–1	4–1	1–1	5–1	2–3	3–0	3–3
Adelaide Comets	0–3	1–8		2–1	3–4	1–3	1–2	1–2	1–0	0–1	4–3	2–2	1–4	2–0
Adelaide Raiders	1–1	1–3	0–1		3–1	3–1	1–1	3–0	2–1	0–3	1–2	1–2	1–3	2–2
Campbelltown City	1–1	0–4	1–0	2–1		0–1	4–0	1–2	3–3	1–1	3–1	0–0	1–0	1–0
Croydon Kings	1–1	2–0	3–1	1–2	0–1		1–1	2–1	2–1	2–0	1–1	1–3	1–0	4–1
Modbury Jets	2–1	1–2	1–5	4–2	1–3	0–4		0–2	3–0	1–3	1–1	0–0	1–2	1–0
North Eastern MetroStars	2–3	4–3	1–0	1–0	0–0	1–1	2–0		3–0	4–2	2–4	0–2	2–3	2–2
Para Hills Knights	1–2	1–2	0–1	4–3	2–5	2–4	1–1	2–0		2–4	0–1	1–1	1–2	0–0
Port Adelaide Pirates	1–1	0–4	1–2	1–6	2–5	2–4	2–2	0–4	1–0		1–2	2–4	1–3	3–0
South Adelaide	1–2	2–3	1–0	1–4	2–3	0–0	1–0	1–4	3–1	2–2		3–2	3–3	0–2
West Adelaide	1–1	3–2	1–2	1–0	1–1	6–1	7–1	1–0	0–1	3–0	3–2		4–2	1–1
West Torrens Birkalla	3–1	3–2	4–0	3–0	3–1	3–3	3–0	1–1	3–2	1–2	4–1	0–0		4–2
White City	1–4	0–2	1–2	0–4	0–0	0–1	0–2	3–3	1–1	1–1	3–3	0–1	2–0	

Updated to match(es) played on 15 August 2015. Source:
Legend: Blue = home team win; Yellow = draw; Red = away team win.

==== Leading Goalscorers ====
Rank	Player	Club	Goals
1	(Australia) Michael Matricciani	Campbelltown City	22
2	(Australia) Tom Briscoe	West Adelaide	20
3	(Australia) Kym Harris	Adelaide Blue Eagles	19
4	(Australia) Elvis Kamsoba	Adelaide Raiders	15
4	(Australia) Nicholas Bucco	Adelaide City	15
4	(Australia) Ryan Kitto	West Torrens Birkalla	15
7	(Australia) Anthony Costa	Adelaide City	14
7	(Australia) Paul Radice	West Torrens Birkalla	14

==== Finals ====
Elimination finals
3	West Torrens Birkalla	0 (5)
6	Campbelltown City	0 (4)
4	Croydon Kings	1 (1)
5	Adelaide City	1 (3)

Semifinals
1	Adelaide Blue Eagles	1
2	West Adelaide	1
West Torrens Birkalla	1
Adelaide City	0

Preliminary final
West Adelaide	5
West Torrens Birkalla	2

Grand final
Adelaide Blue Eagles	0
West Adelaide	3

==== Promotion/relegation play-off ====
4 September 2015
19:30

Adelaide Olympic	1–1	Port Adelaide Pirates

11 September 2015
19:00

Port Adelaide Pirates	0–4	Adelaide Olympic

=== 2015 NPL State League ===
NPL State League
- Season: 2015
- Promoted: Adelaide United Youth, Adelaide Olympic
- Relegated: Adelaide Cobras, Seaford Rangers, Noarlunga United, Northern Demons, Eastern United, Gawler
- Matches: 240
- Goals: 1,005 (4.19 per match)
- Top goalscorer: Donovan Pollock (34 goals)
- Biggest home win: Adelaide United Youth 13−0 Eastern United (21 June 2015)
- Biggest away win: Gawler 0−8 Playford City (30 May 2015)
- Highest scoring: Adelaide United Youth 12−3 Adelaide Victory (29 August 2015)

The 2015 NPL State League was the third edition of the new NPL State League as the second level domestic association football competition in South Australia (and third level within Australia overall). 16 teams competed, all playing each other twice for a total of 30 rounds, with the league and playoff winners at the end of the year promoted to the 2016 National Premier Leagues South Australia.

Pos	Team	Pld	W	D	L	GF	GA	GD	Pts	Qualification or relegation
1	Adelaide United Youth (P)	30	21	3	6	112	33	+79	66	Promoted to the 2016 National Premier Leagues South Australia
2	Adelaide Olympic (P)	30	21	3	6	59	35	+24	66	Qualified for the 2015 promotion play-offs
3	Cumberland United	30	20	5	5	92	40	+52	65	
4	The Cove	30	18	6	6	84	48	+36	60 (Note: Match involving Salisbury and The Cove was abandoned. The FFSA later awarded Salisbury the win and 3 points.)	
5	Western Strikers	30	17	4	9	67	40	+27	55	
6	Adelaide Victory	30	16	4	10	70	58	+12	52	
7	Adelaide Hills Hawks	30	14	8	8	73	59	+14	50	
8	Playford City	30	15	4	11	82	50	+32	49	
9	Sturt Lions	30	12	8	10	62	46	+16	44	
10	Salisbury United	30	12	7	11	55	46	+9	43	
11	Adelaide Cobras (R)	30	10	4	16	61	77	−16	34	Relegation to the 2016 NPL State League 2
12	Seaford Rangers (R)	30	10	2	18	52	90	−38	32	Relegation to the 2016 NPL State League 2
13	Noarlunga United (R)	30	8	4	18	40	66	−26	28	Relegation to the 2016 NPL State League 2
14	Northern Demons (R)	30	8	4	18	38	69	−31	28	Relegation to the 2016 NPL State League 2
15	Eastern United (R)	30	4	1	25	31	106	−75	13	Relegation to the 2016 NPL State League 2
16	Gawler Eagles (R)	30	0	1	29	27	142	−115	1	Relegation to the 2016 NPL State League 2

Source: socceraust.co.uk
Rules for classification: 1) points; 2) goal difference; 3) number of goals scored.
(P) Promoted; (R) Relegated

==== Results ====
Home \ Away	ACB	AHH	AOL	AUN	AVC	TCV	CUM	ESU	GAW	NLU	NTD	PLC	SBU	SFR	STU	WES
Adelaide Cobras		3–4	3–1	0–3	4–3	1–1	0–2	3–2	5–3	3–2	0–1	3–4	1–0	2–0	0–4	4–1
Adelaide Hills Hawks	2–0		0–1	0–4	3–4	3–2	1–0	2–0	1–1	3–1	2–1	1–1	0–0	5–1	2–2	1–3
Adelaide Olympic	2–0	3–3		1–0	1–2	0–1	1–1	5–1	2–0	3–1	2–0	4–3	2–1	2–1	2–0	1–0
Adelaide United Youth	3–3	6–2	3–0		12–3	3–0	5–3	13–0	7–0	4–1	8–0	5–0	5–0	5–1	1–1	1–2
Adelaide Victory	4–1	1–1	2–3	0–2		1–2	0–4	2–0	9–3	3–0	3–0	2–1	3–1	5–1	1–1	1–0
The Cove	6–1	1–2	6–1	2–0	4–4		2–2	5–1	10–0	1–0	3–2	4–3	2–1	4–0	2–2	3–2
Cumberland United	3–1	2–2	0–2	2–1	2–1	1–2		3–0	10–2	5–2	5–1	4–2	4–2	8–0	4–2	0–1
Eastern United	3–4	1–6	0–1	1–2	3–4	1–1	0–5		3–2	1–4	3–1	0–6	0–4	0–2	2–5	1–2
Gawler Eagles	0–6	1–6	1–6	1–4	0–2	2–6	1–2	1–2		0–3	0–2	0–8	0–4	2–4	1–4	1–5
Noarlunga United	1–0	3–2	2–4	1–0	0–2	2–2	0–4	0–2	3–2		1–2	2–2	1–3	3–1	0–1	0–0
Northern Demons	5–0	4–3	0–2	0–2	0–2	1–3	2–2	2–1	2–0	0–3		1–2	2–2	1–0	2–2	3–3
Playford City	3–1	1–1	0–1	0–3	1–2	5–1	1–1	8–1	2–0	4–1	5–0		3–0	7–0	1–0	3–1
Salisbury United	2–1	3–4	1–1	3–1	1–1	3–0	2–4	4–0	2–1	5–1	2–0	2–3		1–1	3–1	0–0
Seaford Rangers	5–5	3–6	1–0	3–5	2–1	0–4	2–5	3–1	4–1	2–0	4–2	4–2	2–3		2–3	3–2
Sturt Lions	3–3	3–4	1–2	2–3	1–0	2–3	1–2	5–1	8–0	1–1	2–0	2–1	0–0	1–0		1–3
Western Strikers	4–3	3–1	1–3	1–1	4–2	2–1	1–2	1–0	10–1	4–1	2–1	3–0	2–0	4–0	0–1	

Updated to match(es) played on 29 August 2015. Source:
Legend: Blue = home team win; Yellow = draw; Red = away team win.

==== Leading Goalscorers ====
Correct as of conclusion of Round 30

Rank	Player	Club	Goals
1	(Australia) Doni Pollock	Adelaide United Youth	34
2	(Australia) Fausto Erba	Adelaide Olympic	32
3	(Australia) Matthew Gaston	Playford City Patriots	26
4	(Australia) Shomari Sabatho	Playford City Patriots	22
4	(Australia) Oliver Grant	The Cove	22

=== 2015 SA Regional Leagues ===
Association	Champions
Collegiate Soccer League	Rostrevor Old Collegians
Port Lincoln Soccer Association	South Coast
Riverland Soccer Association	Barmera United
Western Border Football Association	International Mount Gambier

=== 2015 Women's Premier League ===
Women's Premier League
- Season: 2015
- Premiers: Metro United

This was the last season of the Premier League format before the introduction of the NPL. The 9 teams played a double round-robin for a total of 16 games.

Pos	Team	Pld	W	D	L	GF	GA	GD	Pts
1	Metro United (C)	16	14	1	1	95	17	+78	43
2	Adelaide City	16	13	1	2	46	13	+33	40
3	West Adelaide	16	10	1	5	48	22	+26	31
4	Fulham United	16	7	3	6	35	38	−3	24
5	Adelaide University	16	7	3	6	51	57	−6	24
6	Para Hills Knights	16	6	3	7	30	33	−3	21
7	Sturt Marion	16	5	3	8	38	37	+1	18
8	Cumberland United	16	1	1	14	16	47	−31	4
9	FFSA U15s	16	1	0	15	11	106	−95	3

Source: sportstg.com
Rules for classification: 1) points; 2) goal difference; 3) number of goals scored.
(C) Champions

== Cup Competitions ==
=== 2015 Federation Cup ===
South Australian soccer clubs competed in 2015 for the Federation Cup. Clubs entered from the NPL SA, the State League 1 and State League 2.

This knockout competition was won by Croydon Kings.

The competition also served as the South Australian Preliminary Rounds for the 2015 FFA Cup. In addition to the Croydon Kings, North Eastern MetroStars (as the 2014 National Premier Leagues Champion), and the A-League club Adelaide United qualified for the final rounds, entering at the Round of 32.
