= 1998 SASF season =

South Australian Soccer Federation
- Season: 1998
- Champions: West Torrens Birkalla

The 1998 South Australian Soccer Federation season was the 92nd season of soccer in South Australia.

== 1998 SASF Premier League ==
SASF Premier League
- Season: 1998
- Champions: Grand Final; West Torrens Birkalla; Minor Premiership; West Torrens Birkalla
- Matches: 90
- Goals: 277 (3.08 per match)
- Biggest home win: West Torrens Birkalla 6–1 Elizabeth City (15 August 1998)
- Biggest away win: 4 goals (4 times)
- Highest scoring: Croydon Kings 5–4 Adelaide Raiders (13 June 1998)

The 1998 South Australian Premier League season was the top level domestic association football competition in South Australia for 1998. It was contested by 10 teams in a single 18 round league format, each team playing all of their opponents twice.

Pos	Team	Pld	W	D	L	GF	GA	GD	Pts	Qualification
1	West Torrens Birkalla (C)	18	13	2	3	43	25	+18	41	Qualification for Finals
2	Campbelltown City	18	11	3	4	37	18	+19	36	Qualification for Finals
3	Croydon Kings	18	9	4	5	34	27	+7	31	Qualification for Finals
4	Adelaide Blue Eagles	18	7	3	8	23	28	−5	24	Qualification for Finals
5	White City	18	6	5	7	25	23	+2	23	Qualification for Finals
6	Port Adelaide Lion	18	6	4	8	24	26	−2	22	
7	Cumberland United	18	6	4	8	22	32	−10	22	
8	Elizabeth City	18	5	5	8	29	33	−4	20	
9	Olympians	18	6	2	10	17	34	−17	20	
10	Adelaide Raiders	18	4	2	12	23	31	−8	14	

Source: SA Premier League
(C) Champions

=== Finals ===
Elimination and Qualifying Finals
2	Campbelltown City	3
3	Croydon Kings	5
4	Adelaide Blue Eagles	0
5	Woodville White City	4

Semifinals
1	West Torrens Birkalla	3 (9)
3	Croydon Kings	3 (10)
2	Woodville White City	0 (2)
5	Campbelltown City	0 (4)

Preliminary Final
1	West Torrens Birkalla	2
5	Campbelltown City	1

Grand Final
1	West Torrens Birkalla	1
3	Croydon Kings	0

== 1998 SASF State League ==
SASF State League
- Season: 1998
- Promoted: Modbury Jets; Para Hills Knights
- Matches: 132
- Goals: 477 (3.61 per match)
- Biggest home win: Adelaide City 7–0 Para Hills Knights (23 May 1998); West Adelaide 7-0 Port Pirie City (20 June 1998)
- Biggest away win: Port Pirie City 0–6 Para Hills Knights (27 June 1998)
- Highest scoring: Seaford Rangers 5–3 Para Hills Knights (21 March 1998); Port Pirie City 3–5 West Adelaide (4 April 1998)

The 1998 South Australian State League season was the second highest domestic level association football competition in South Australia. It was contested by 12 teams in a 22-round league format, each team playing all of their opponents twice. West Adelaide and Adelaide City refused to take part in the finals series.

Pos	Team	Pld	W	D	L	GF	GA	GD	Pts	Qualification or relegation
1	Modbury Jets (C, P)	22	15	5	2	57	27	+30	50	Promotion to SASF Premier League and qualification for Finals
2	West Adelaide	22	13	4	5	54	31	+23	43	
3	Enfield City	22	12	5	5	38	31	+7	41	Qualification for Finals
4	Adelaide Cobras	22	12	3	7	42	33	+9	39	Qualification for Finals
5	Adelaide City	22	10	5	7	41	25	+16	35	
6	Para Hills Knights (P)	22	10	3	9	38	37	+1	33	Qualification for Finals
7	Noarlunga United	22	8	5	9	37	41	−4	29	Qualification for Finals
8	Adelaide Hills Hawks	22	7	4	11	37	45	−8	25	
9	Salisbury United	22	7	2	13	36	53	−17	23	
10	Port Pirie City	22	4	7	11	41	60	−19	19	
11	Western Strikers	22	3	7	12	26	40	−14	16	
12	Seaford Rangers	22	4	4	14	30	54	−24	16	

Source: SA State League
(C) Champions; (P) Promoted

=== Finals ===
Elimination and Qualifying Finals
3	Enfield City	2
4	Adelaide Cobras	3
6	Para Hills Knights	3
7	Noarlunga United	0

Semifinals
1	Modbury Jets	2
4	Adelaide Cobras	1
3	Enfield City	0
6	Para Hills Knights	1

Preliminary Final
4	Adelaide Cobras	0
6	Para Hills Knights	2

Grand Final
1	Modbury Jets	1
6	Para Hills Knights	0

== See also ==
- National Premier Leagues South Australia
- Football Federation South Australia
