= 1989 SASF season =

South Australian Soccer Federation
- Season: 1989

The 1989 South Australian Soccer Federation season was the 83rd season of soccer in South Australia.

== 1989 SASF Division One ==
SASF Division One
- Season: 1989
- Champions: West Adelaide Hellas (8th title)
- Matches played: 132
- Goals scored: 337 (2.55 per match)

The 1989 South Australian Division One season was the 83rd season of first division soccer in South Australia.

West Adelaide Hellas were champions for the eighth time. Para Hills and Campbelltown City were relegated.

=== League table ===
Pos	Team	Pld	W	D	L	GF	GA	GD	Pts	Qualification or relegation
1	West Adelaide Hellas (C)	22	19	2	1	54	13	+41	40	Qualification for Top Four Cup
2	West Torrens Birkalla	22	12	5	5	33	26	+7	29	Qualification for Top Four Cup
3	Polonia Adelaide	22	12	2	8	34	22	+12	26	Qualification for Top Four Cup
4	Salisbury United	22	10	6	6	33	25	+8	26	Qualification for Top Four Cup
5	Eastern Districts Azzurri	22	9	7	6	36	26	+10	25	
6	Modbury Jets	22	7	8	7	21	21	0	22	
7	Lion-Grange	22	9	4	9	25	37	−12	22	
8	Adelaide Croatia	22	5	8	9	24	30	−6	18	
9	Adelaide City	22	4	8	10	17	30	−13	16	
10	Port Adelaide	22	5	5	12	26	35	−9	15	
11	Para Hills (R)	22	3	7	12	18	34	−16	13	Relegation to SASF Division Two
12	Campbelltown City (R)	22	3	6	13	16	38	−22	12	Relegation to SASF Division Two

Source: socceraust
Rules for classification: 1) points; 2) goal difference; 3) number of goals scored.
(C) Champions; (R) Relegated

== 1989 SASF Division Two ==
SASF Division Two
- Season: 1989
- Champions: Beograd Woodville (4th title)
- Matches played: 90
- Goals scored: 236 (2.62 per match)

The 1989 South Australian Division Two season was the 65th season of second division soccer in South Australia.

Beograd Woodville were champions for the fourth time, and were promoted with Cumberland United.

=== League table ===
Pos	Team	Pld	W	D	L	GF	GA	GD	Pts	Promotion
1	Beograd Woodville (C, P)	18	14	3	1	39	9	+30	31	Promotion to SASF Division One
2	Cumberland United (P)	18	10	4	4	26	18	+8	24	Promotion to SASF Division One
3	Blackwood	18	9	5	4	26	15	+11	23	
4	Seaford Rangers	18	8	4	6	24	25	−1	20	
5	Noarlunga United	18	6	5	7	21	24	−3	17	
6	Enfield City Falcons	18	4	8	6	20	20	0	16	
7	Central Districts APAC	18	7	2	9	28	33	−5	16	
8	Elizabeth City	18	5	3	10	17	32	−15	13	
9	Adelaide Omonia	18	4	3	11	22	32	−10	11	
10	Thebarton Asteras	18	3	3	12	13	28	−15	9	

Source: socceraust
Rules for classification: 1) points; 2) goal difference; 3) number of goals scored.
(C) Champions; (P) Promoted

== 1989 Top Four Cup ==
The 1989 Top Four Cup, known as the 1989 Coca-Cola Cup for sponsorship reasons, was the 21st edition of the Top Four Cup, a post-season knockout competition contested by the top four teams from the Division One season.

West Torrens Birkalla won the competition for the first time.
