= 1990 SASF season =

South Australian Soccer Federation
- Season: 1990

The 1990 South Australian Soccer Federation season was the 84th season of soccer in South Australia.

== 1990 SASF Division One ==
SASF Division One
- Season: 1990
- Champions: West Adelaide Hellas (9th title)
- Matches: 132
- Goals: 350 (2.65 per match)

The 1990 South Australian Division One season was the 84th season of first division soccer in South Australia.

West Adelaide Hellas were champions for the ninth time. Cumberland United and Port Adelaide were relegated.

=== League Table ===
| Pos | Team | Pld | W | D | L | GF | GA | GD | Pts | Qualification or relegation |
|---|---|---|---|---|---|---|---|---|---|---|
| 1 | West Adelaide Hellas (C) | 22 | 16 | 3 | 3 | 46 | 17 | +29 | 35 | Qualification for Top Four Cup |
| 2 | Adelaide Croatia | 22 | 14 | 6 | 2 | 40 | 22 | +18 | 34 | Qualification for Top Four Cup |
| 3 | Polonia Adelaide | 22 | 9 | 10 | 3 | 39 | 21 | +18 | 28 | Qualification for Top Four Cup |
| 4 | Eastern Districts Azzurri | 22 | 10 | 7 | 5 | 29 | 19 | +10 | 27 | Qualification for Top Four Cup |
| 5 | Modbury Jets | 22 | 8 | 7 | 7 | 35 | 38 | −3 | 23 | |
| 6 | Salisbury United | 22 | 8 | 6 | 8 | 28 | 29 | −1 | 22 | |
| 7 | Beograd Woodville | 22 | 7 | 8 | 7 | 27 | 29 | −2 | 22 | |
| 8 | Adelaide City | 22 | 5 | 11 | 6 | 20 | 19 | +1 | 21 | |
| 9 | West Torrens Birkalla | 22 | 7 | 6 | 9 | 35 | 32 | +3 | 20 | |
| 10 | Lion-Grange | 22 | 5 | 8 | 9 | 21 | 29 | −8 | 18 | |
| 11 | Cumberland United (R) | 22 | 4 | 2 | 16 | 18 | 38 | −20 | 10 | Relegated to the SASF Division Two |
| 12 | Port Adelaide (R) | 22 | 2 | 0 | 20 | 12 | 57 | −45 | 4 | Relegated to the SASF Division Two |

Source: socceraust
Rules for classification: 1) points; 2) goal difference; 3) number of goals scored.
(C) Champions; (R) Relegated

== 1990 SASF Division Two ==
SASF Division Two
- Season: 1990
- Champions: Para Hills (2nd title)
- Matches: 90
- Goals: 191 (2.12 per match)

The 1990 South Australian Division Two season was the 66th season of second division soccer in South Australia.

Para Hills were champions for the second time, and were promoted with Blackwood.

=== League Table ===
| Pos | Team | Pld | W | D | L | GF | GA | GD | Pts | Qualification or relegation |
|---|---|---|---|---|---|---|---|---|---|---|
| 1 | Para Hills (C, P) | 18 | 11 | 4 | 3 | 28 | 10 | +18 | 26 | Promotion to SASF Division One |
| 2 | Blackwood (P) | 18 | 11 | 3 | 4 | 27 | 8 | +19 | 25 | Promotion to SASF Division One |
| 3 | Campbelltown City | 18 | 11 | 3 | 4 | 28 | 15 | +13 | 25 | |
| 4 | Enfield City Falcons | 18 | 8 | 6 | 4 | 28 | 20 | +8 | 22 | |
| 5 | Olympians | 18 | 8 | 4 | 6 | 23 | 20 | +3 | 20 | |
| 6 | Central Districts APAC | 18 | 5 | 7 | 6 | 17 | 15 | +2 | 17 | |
| 7 | Adelaide Omonia | 18 | 6 | 5 | 7 | 11 | 14 | −3 | 17 | |
| 8 | Elizabeth City | 18 | 3 | 5 | 10 | 11 | 28 | −17 | 11 | |
| 9 | Noarlunga United | 18 | 4 | 2 | 12 | 11 | 33 | −22 | 10 | |
| 10 | Seaford Rangers | 18 | 1 | 5 | 12 | 7 | 28 | −21 | 7 | |

Source: socceraust
Rules for classification: 1) points; 2) goal difference; 3) number of goals scored.
(C) Champions; (P) Promoted

== 1990 Top Four Cup ==
The 1990 Top Four Cup, known as the 1990 Coca-Cola Cup for sponsorship reasons, was the 22nd edition of the Top Four Cup, a post-season knockout competition contested by the top four teams from the Division One season.

Eastern Districts Azzurri won the competition for the third time.
