= 2000 SASF season =

South Australian Soccer Federation
- Season: 2000
- Champions: Adelaide Blue Eagles

The 2000 South Australian Soccer Federation season was the 94th season of soccer in South Australia.

== 2000 SASF Premier League ==
South Australian Premier League
- Season: 2000
- Champions: Grand Final; Adelaide Blue Eagles; Minor Premiership; Adelaide Blue Eagles
- Relegated: Cumberland United; West Torrens Birkalla
- Matches: 132
- Biggest home win: Adelaide Blue Eagles 5–0 West Torrens Birkalla (24 June 2000)
- Biggest away win: West Torrens Birkalla 0–7 Croydon Kings (25 March 2000)
- Highest scoring: Cumberland United 3–5 Croydon Kings (29 April 2000) (8 goals)

The 2000 South Australian Premier League season was the top level domestic association football competition in South Australia for 2000. It was contested by 12 teams in a single 22 round league format, each team playing all of their opponents twice.

Pos	Team	Pld	W	D	L	GF	GA	GD	Pts	Qualification or relegation
1	Adelaide Blue Eagles (C)	22	18	1	3	63	17	+46	55	Qualification for Finals
2	Port Adelaide Lion	22	15	2	5	43	19	+24	47	Qualification for Finals
3	Modbury Jets	22	15	2	5	35	26	+9	47	Qualification for Finals
4	Croydon Kings	22	14	1	7	51	27	+24	43	Qualification for Finals
5	Campbelltown City	22	9	2	11	29	36	−7	29	Qualification for Finals
6	Adelaide Raiders	22	9	1	12	27	34	−7	28	
7	Elizabeth City	22	7	5	10	28	29	−1	26	
8	White City	22	7	3	12	17	29	−12	24	
9	North Eastern MetroStars	22	6	6	10	25	40	−15	24	
10	Adelaide City	22	6	5	11	26	36	−10	23	
11	Cumberland United (R)	22	4	5	13	16	34	−18	17	Relegation to SASF State League
12	West Torrens Birkalla (R)	22	3	5	14	17	50	−33	14	Relegation to SASF State League

(C) Champions; (R) Relegated

=== Finals ===
Elimination and Qualifying Finals
2	Port Adelaide Lion	0
3	Modbury Jets	1
4	Croydon Kings	3
5	Campbelltown City	1

Semifinals
1	Adelaide Blue Eagles	1
3	Modbury Jets	0
2	Port Adelaide Lion	1
4	Croydon Kings	0

Preliminary Final
2	Port Adelaide Lion	0
3	Modbury Jets	3

Grand Final
1	Adelaide Blue Eagles	2
3	Modbury Jets	1

== 2000 SASF State League ==
South Australian State League
- Season: 2000
- Promoted: Adelaide Olympic; Port Pirie City
- Matches: 132
- Biggest home win: Para Hills Knights 6–0 Adelaide Hills (25 March 2000); Western Strikers 6–0 South Adelaide (8 July 2000)
- Biggest away win: 5 goals (3 times)
- Highest scoring: Enfield City 2–7 Adelaide Olympic (15 March 2000); Adelaide Olympic 7–2 Noarlunga United (16 June 2000) (9 goals)

The 2000 South Australian State League season was the second highest domestic level association football competition in South Australia. It was contested by 12 teams in a single 22 round league format, each team playing all of their opponents twice.

=== League table ===
Pos	Team	Pld	W	D	L	GF	GA	GD	Pts	Promotion or qualification
1	Adelaide Olympic (C, P)	22	17	5	0	66	19	+47	56	Promotion to SASF Premier League
2	Northern Demons	22	12	4	6	46	34	+12	40	Qualification for Finals
3	Port Pirie City (P)	22	11	6	5	44	34	+10	39	Qualification for Finals
4	Para Hills Knights	22	11	5	6	49	27	+22	38	Qualification for Finals
5	Adelaide Cobras	22	12	2	8	43	38	+5	38	Qualification for Finals
6	Western Strikers	22	9	8	5	47	34	+13	35	
7	Salisbury United	22	11	2	9	36	39	−3	35	
8	Enfield City	22	7	7	8	39	38	+1	28	
9	Noarlunga United	22	7	2	13	34	51	−17	23	
10	Adelaide Hills Hawks	22	5	6	11	37	48	−11	21	
11	Seaford Rangers	22	4	2	16	23	55	−32	14	
12	South Adelaide	22	1	1	20	17	64	−47	4	

(C) Champions; (P) Promoted

=== Finals ===
Elimination and Qualifying Finals
2	Northern Demons	1
3	Port Pirie City	2
4	Para Hills Knights	1
5	Adelaide Cobras	2

Semifinals
1	Adelaide Olympic	5
3	Port Pirie City	0
2	Northern Demons	1
5	Adelaide Cobras	0

Preliminary Final
3	Port Pirie City	1 (5)
2	Northern Demons	1 (3)

Grand Final
1	Adelaide Olympic	3
3	Port Pirie City	1

== See also ==
- 2000 SASF Premier League
- 2000 SASF State League
- National Premier Leagues South Australia
- Football Federation South Australia
