= 1999 SASF season =

South Australian Soccer Federation
- Season: 1999
- Champions: Cumberland United

The 1999 South Australian Soccer Federation season was the 93rd season of soccer in South Australia.

== 1999 SASF Premier League ==
South Australian Premier League
- Season: 1999
- Champions: Grand Final; Cumberland United; Minor Premiership; Port Adelaide Lion
- Relegated: Para Hills Knights; Olympians
- Matches: 132
- Biggest home win: West Torrens Birkalla 7–0 White City Woodville (31 July 1999)
- Biggest away win: Olympians 0–5 Port Adelaide Lion (31 July 1999)
- Highest scoring: 8 goals(3 times)

The 1999 South Australian Premier League season was the top level domestic association football competition in South Australia for 1999. It was contested by 12 teams in a single 22 round league format, each team playing all of their opponents twice.

Pos	Team	Pld	W	D	L	GF	GA	GD	Pts	Qualification or relegation
1	Port Adelaide Lion	22	12	4	6	47	31	+16	40	Qualification for Finals
2	Cumberland United (C)	22	11	6	5	34	28	+6	39	Qualification for Finals
3	Campbelltown City	22	11	5	6	47	33	+14	38	Qualification for Finals
4	Adelaide Raiders	22	11	5	6	33	23	+10	38	Qualification for Finals
5	Elizabeth City	22	11	5	6	38	29	+9	38	Qualification for Finals
6	West Torrens Birkalla	22	10	3	9	41	43	−2	33	
7	Croydon Kings	22	8	8	6	47	31	+16	32	
8	White City	22	9	5	8	34	43	−9	32	
9	Adelaide Blue Eagles	22	8	6	8	38	29	+9	30	
10	Modbury Jets	22	7	3	12	38	48	−10	24	
11	Para Hills Knights (R)	22	4	5	13	26	45	−19	17	Relegation to SASF State League
12	Olympians (R)	22	0	5	17	23	63	−40	5	Relegation to SASF State League

(C) Champions; (R) Relegated

=== Finals ===
Elimination and Qualifying Finals
2	Cumberland United (p)	0 (4)
3	Campbelltown City	0 (2)
4	Adelaide Raiders	2
5	Elizabeth City	1

Semifinals
1	Port Adelaide Lion	1
2	Cumberland United	2
3	Campbelltown City	1
4	Adelaide Raiders	2

Preliminary Final
1	Port Adelaide Lion	3
4	Adelaide Raiders	1

Grand Final
1	Port Adelaide Lion	0
2	Cumberland United	1

== 1999 SASF State League ==
South Australian State League
- Season: 1999
- Promoted: Adelaide City; North Eastern MetroStars
- Matches: 156
- Biggest home win: Salisbury United 7–0 Seaford Rangers (5 June 1999)
- Biggest away win: South Adelaide 0–8 North Eastern MetroStars (13 March 1999)
- Highest scoring: Adelaide Hills 5–4 Western Strikers (10 April 1999); North Eastern MetroStars 7–2 South Adelaide (29 May 1999) (9 goals)

The 1999 South Australian State League season was the second highest domestic level association football competition in South Australia. It was contested by 13 teams in a 26-round league format, each team playing all of their opponents twice.

Pos	Team	Pld	W	D	L	GF	GA	GD	Pts	Qualification or relegation
1	Adelaide City (C, P)	24	17	3	4	73	29	+44	54	Promotion to SASF Premier League and qualification for Finals
2	Enfield City	24	14	5	5	65	33	+32	47	Qualification for Finals
3	North Eastern MetroStars (P)	24	13	4	7	55	37	+18	43	Qualification for Finals
4	Port Pirie City	24	12	5	7	47	38	+9	41	Qualification for Finals
5	Salisbury United	24	12	4	8	55	44	+11	40	Qualification for Finals
6	West Adelaide	24	11	5	8	55	37	+18	38	Disbanded at end of season
7	Noarlunga United	24	11	5	8	37	34	+3	38	
8	Adelaide Cobras	24	9	4	11	35	41	−6	31	
9	Western Strikers	24	9	3	12	44	50	−6	30	
10	Seaford Rangers	24	6	5	13	24	56	−32	23	
11	Northern Demons	24	6	4	14	46	54	−8	22	
12	Adelaide Hills Hawks	24	7	1	16	35	62	−27	22	
13	South Adelaide	24	3	4	17	24	80	−56	13	

(C) Champions; (P) Promoted

=== Finals ===
Elimination and Qualifying Finals
2	Enfield City	2
3	North Eastern MetroStars	3
4	Port Pirie City	2
5	Salisbury United	4

Semifinals
1	Adelaide City	5
3	North Eastern MetroStars	1
2	Enfield City	3
5	Salisbury United	0

Preliminary Final
2	Enfield City	0
3	North Eastern MetroStars	3

Grand Final
1	Adelaide City	2
3	North Eastern MetroStars	0

== See also ==
- 1999 SASF Premier League
- 1999 SASF State League
- National Premier Leagues South Australia
- Football Federation South Australia
