= 1987 SASF season =

South Australian Soccer Federation
- Season: 1987

The 1987 South Australian Soccer Federation season was the 81st season of soccer in South Australia.

== 1987 SASF Division One ==
SASF Division One
- Season: 1987
- Champions: West Adelaide Hellas (7th title)
- Matches played: 132
- Goals scored: 328 (2.48 per match)

The 1987 South Australian Division One season was the 81st season of first division soccer in South Australia.

West Adelaide Hellas were champions for the seventh time. Eastern Districts Azzurri and Central Districts APAC were relegated.

=== League Table ===
Pos	Team	Pld	W	D	L	GF	GA	GD	Pts	Qualification or relegation
1	West Adelaide Hellas (C)	22	15	4	3	45	20	+25	34	Qualification for Top Four Cup
2	Salisbury United	22	13	7	2	31	13	+18	33	Qualification for Top Four Cup
3	Beograd Woodville	22	12	7	3	36	17	+19	31	Qualification for Top Four Cup
4	Adelaide Croatia	22	12	6	4	34	14	+20	30	Qualification for Top Four Cup
5	Campbelltown City	22	8	8	6	26	19	+7	24	
6	Para Hills	22	9	4	9	32	23	+9	22	
7	Lion-Grange	22	8	5	9	27	36	−9	21	
8	Polonia Adelaide	22	6	7	9	30	41	−11	19	
9	West Torrens Birkalla	22	4	6	12	17	29	−12	14	
10	Cumberland United	22	2	10	10	19	37	−18	14	
11	Eastern Districts Azzurri (R)	22	4	5	13	18	36	−18	11 (Note: Eastern Districts Azzurri had 2 competition points removed for fielding an ineligible player)	Relegation to SASF Division Two
12	Central Districts APAC (R)	22	2	5	15	13	43	−30	9	Relegation to SASF Division Two

Source: socceraust
Rules for classification: 1) points; 2) goal difference; 3) number of goals scored.
(C) Champions; (R) Relegated

== 1987 SASF Division Two ==
SASF Division Two
- Season: 1987
- Champions: Adelaide City (3rd title)
- Matches played: 90
- Goals scored: 262 (2.91 per match)

The 1987 South Australian Division Two season was the 64th season of second division soccer in South Australia.

Adelaide City were champions for the third time, and were promoted with Modbury Jets.

=== League Table ===
Pos	Team	Pld	W	D	L	GF	GA	GD	Pts	Promotion
1	Adelaide City (C, P)	18	12	2	4	49	17	+32	26	Promotion to SASF Division One
2	Modbury Jets (P)	18	12	2	4	31	17	+14	26	Promotion to SASF Division One
3	Seaford Rangers	18	12	0	6	25	14	+11	24	
4	Noarlunga United	18	9	4	5	33	23	+10	22	
5	Playford City Patriots	18	8	4	6	28	28	0	20	
6	Blackwood	18	7	3	8	24	28	−4	17	
7	Enfield City Falcons	18	7	3	8	21	27	−6	17	
8	Port Adelaide	18	4	4	10	20	32	−12	12	
9	Thebarton Asteras	18	5	0	13	19	43	−24	10	
10	Brighton City	18	1	4	13	12	33	−21	6	

Source: socceraust
Rules for classification: 1) points; 2) goal difference; 3) number of goals scored.
(C) Champions; (P) Promoted

== 1987 Top Four Cup ==
The 1987 Top Four Cup, known as the 1987 Coca-Cola Cup for sponsorship reasons, was the 19th edition of the Top Four Cup, a post-season knockout competition contested by the top four teams from the Division One season.

West Adelaide Hellas won the competition for the sixth time, defeating Adelaide Croatia in the final.

=== Bracket ===
Finals
1	West Adelaide Hellas
2	Adelaide Croatia
