= 1986 SASF season =

South Australian Soccer Federation
- Season: 1986

The 1986 South Australian Soccer Federation season was the 80th season of soccer in South Australia.

== 1986 SASF Division One ==
SASF Division One
- Season: 1986
- Champions: Campbelltown City (1st title)
- Matches played: 132
- Goals scored: 359 (2.72 per match)

The 1986 South Australian Division One season was the 80th season of first division soccer in South Australia.

Campbelltown City were champions for the first time. Modbury Jets and Elizabeth City were relegated.

=== League Table ===
| Pos | Team | Pld | W | D | L | GF | GA | GD | Pts | Qualification or relegation |
|---|---|---|---|---|---|---|---|---|---|---|
| 1 | Campbelltown City (C) | 22 | 12 | 9 | 1 | 40 | 18 | +22 | 33 | Qualification for Top Four Cup |
| 2 | Adelaide Croatia | 22 | 10 | 10 | 2 | 37 | 18 | +19 | 30 | Qualification for Top Four Cup |
| 3 | Beograd Woodville | 22 | 11 | 6 | 5 | 40 | 28 | +12 | 28 | Qualification for Top Four Cup |
| 4 | West Adelaide Hellas | 22 | 10 | 7 | 5 | 33 | 21 | +12 | 27 | Qualification for Top Four Cup |
| 5 | Salisbury United | 22 | 7 | 8 | 7 | 29 | 25 | +4 | 22 | |
| 6 | Polonia Adelaide | 22 | 8 | 6 | 8 | 27 | 26 | +1 | 22 | |
| 7 | Para Hills | 22 | 8 | 5 | 9 | 31 | 33 | −2 | 21 | |
| 8 | Eastern Districts Azzurri | 22 | 7 | 6 | 9 | 32 | 34 | −2 | 20 | |
| 9 | West Torrens Birkalla | 22 | 6 | 5 | 11 | 22 | 35 | −13 | 17 | |
| 10 | Lion-Grange | 22 | 5 | 7 | 10 | 25 | 38 | −13 | 17 | |
| 11 | Modbury Jets (R) | 22 | 4 | 6 | 12 | 25 | 47 | −22 | 14 | Relegation to SASF Division Two |
| 12 | Elizabeth City (R) | 22 | 3 | 7 | 12 | 18 | 36 | −18 | 13 | Relegation to SASF Division Two |

Source: socceraust
Rules for classification: 1) points; 2) goal difference; 3) number of goals scored.
(C) Champions; (R) Relegated

== 1986 SASF Division Two ==
SASF Division Two
- Season: 1986
- Champions: Cumberland United (2nd title)
- Matches played: 110
- Goals scored: 294 (2.67 per match)

The 1986 South Australian Division Two season was the 63rd season of second division soccer in South Australia.

Cumberland United were champions for the second time, and were promoted with West Fields APAC. Athelstone withdrew from SASF competitions after the season.

=== League Table ===
| Pos | Team | Pld | W | D | L | GF | GA | GD | Pts | Promotion |
|---|---|---|---|---|---|---|---|---|---|---|
| 1 | Cumberland United (C, P) | 20 | 13 | 6 | 1 | 37 | 15 | +22 | 32 | Promotion to SASF Division One |
| 2 | West Fields APAC (P) | 20 | 11 | 7 | 2 | 35 | 17 | +18 | 29 | Promotion to SASF Division One |
| 3 | Seaford-Noarlunga | 20 | 11 | 6 | 3 | 32 | 18 | +14 | 28 | |
| 4 | Windsor Melita | 20 | 6 | 9 | 5 | 34 | 28 | +6 | 21 | |
| 5 | Blackwood | 20 | 7 | 5 | 8 | 25 | 22 | +3 | 19 | |
| 6 | Noarlunga United | 20 | 7 | 5 | 8 | 20 | 21 | −1 | 19 | |
| 7 | Thebarton Asteras | 20 | 5 | 9 | 6 | 31 | 37 | −6 | 19 | |
| 8 | Adelaide City | 20 | 6 | 6 | 8 | 24 | 27 | −3 | 18 | |
| 9 | Athelstone | 20 | 6 | 4 | 10 | 18 | 37 | −19 | 16 | Withdrew at end of season |
| 10 | Port Adelaide | 20 | 4 | 5 | 11 | 25 | 33 | −8 | 13 | |
| 11 | Brighton City | 20 | 1 | 4 | 15 | 13 | 39 | −26 | 6 | |

Source: socceraust
Rules for classification: 1) points; 2) goal difference; 3) number of goals scored.
(C) Champions; (P) Promoted

== 1986 Top Four Cup ==
The 1986 Top Four Cup, known as the 1986 Coca-Cola Cup for sponsorship reasons, was the 18th edition of the Top Four Cup, a post-season knockout competition contested by the top four teams from the Division One season.

West Adelaide Hellas won the competition for the fifth time, defeating Beograd Woodville in the final.

=== Bracket ===
| Finals |
| 4 | West Adelaide Hellas |
| 3 | Beograd Woodville |
