= 2001 SASF season =

South Australian Soccer Federation
- Season: 2001
- Champions: Adelaide Blue Eagles

The 2001 South Australian Soccer Federation season was the 95th season of soccer in South Australia.

== 2001 SASF Premier League ==
South Australian Premier League
- Season: 2001
- Champions: Grand Final; Adelaide Blue Eagles; Minor Premiership; Adelaide Blue Eagles
- Relegated: Croydon Kings; Port Pirie City
- Matches: 132
- Biggest home win: Adelaide Blue Eagles 7–0 Port Adelaide Lion (31 March 2001); Adelaide City 8–1 Port Pirie City (12 May 2001)
- Biggest away win: Playford City Patriots 1–7 Adelaide Blue Eagles (19 May 2001)
- Highest scoring: Adelaide Blue Eagles 8–2 North Eastern MetroStars (14 April 2001); Adelaide Blue Eagles 6–4 Modbury Jets (23 June 2001) (10 goals)

The 2001 South Australian Premier League season was the top level domestic association football competition in South Australia for 2001. It was contested by 12 teams in a single 22 round league format, each team playing all of their opponents twice.

| Pos | Team | Pld | W | D | L | GF | GA | GD | Pts | Qualification or relegation |
|---|---|---|---|---|---|---|---|---|---|---|
| 1 | Adelaide Blue Eagles (C) | 22 | 15 | 2 | 5 | 68 | 31 | +37 | 47 | Qualification for Finals |
| 2 | Modbury Jets | 22 | 12 | 6 | 4 | 44 | 18 | +26 | 42 | Qualification for Finals |
| 3 | North Eastern MetroStars | 22 | 11 | 6 | 5 | 35 | 28 | +7 | 39 | Qualification for Finals |
| 4 | Campbelltown City | 22 | 11 | 5 | 6 | 30 | 30 | 0 | 38 | Qualification for Finals |
| 5 | Adelaide City | 22 | 11 | 4 | 7 | 46 | 26 | +20 | 37 | Qualification for Finals |
| 6 | White City | 22 | 10 | 7 | 5 | 30 | 25 | +5 | 37 | |
| 7 | Playford City | 22 | 8 | 5 | 9 | 29 | 38 | −9 | 29 | |
| 8 | Adelaide Raiders | 22 | 6 | 6 | 10 | 22 | 33 | −11 | 24 | |
| 9 | Adelaide Olympic | 22 | 4 | 11 | 7 | 24 | 25 | −1 | 23 | |
| 10 | Port Adelaide Lion | 22 | 4 | 8 | 10 | 18 | 41 | −23 | 20 | |
| 11 | Croydon Kings (R) | 22 | 3 | 5 | 14 | 25 | 41 | −16 | 14 | Relegation to SASF State League |
| 12 | Port Pirie City (R) | 22 | 3 | 3 | 16 | 27 | 62 | −35 | 12 | Relegation to SASF State League |

(C) Champions; (R) Relegated

=== Finals ===
Elimination and Qualifying Finals
2 | Modbury Jets | 1
3 | North Eastern MetroStars | 0
4 | Campbelltown City | 2
5 | Adelaide City | 0

Semifinals
1 | Adelaide Blue Eagles | 2
2 | Modbury Jets | 0
3 | North Eastern MetroStars | 6
4 | Campbelltown City | 1

Preliminary Final
2 | Modbury Jets | 1
3 | North Eastern MetroStars | 0

Grand Final
1 | Adelaide Blue Eagles | 3 (8)
2 | Modbury Jets | 3 (7)

== 2001 SASF State League ==
South Australian State League
- Season: 2001
- Promoted: West Torrens Birkalla; Para Hills Knights
- Matches: 132
- Biggest home win: West Torrens Birkalla 8–0 Adelaide Cobras (31 March 2001); Western Strikers 9–1 Adelaide Cobras (23 June 2001)
- Biggest away win: Cumberland United 0–6 West Torrens Birkalla (5 May 2001)
- Highest scoring: Western Strikers 9–1 Adelaide Cobras (23 June 2001) (10 goals)

The 2001 South Australian State League season was the second highest domestic level association football competition in South Australia. It was contested by 12 teams in a single 22 round league format, each team playing all of their opponents twice.

| Pos | Team | Pld | W | D | L | GF | GA | GD | Pts | Promotion or qualification |
|---|---|---|---|---|---|---|---|---|---|---|
| 1 | West Torrens Birkalla (C, P) | 21 | 19 | 1 | 1 | 88 | 10 | +78 | 58 | Promotion to SASF Premier League |
| 2 | Para Hills Knights (P) | 22 | 15 | 3 | 4 | 50 | 21 | +29 | 48 | Qualification for Finals |
| 3 | Cumberland United | 22 | 11 | 6 | 5 | 41 | 34 | +7 | 39 | Qualification for Finals |
| 4 | Western Strikers | 21 | 9 | 6 | 6 | 36 | 24 | +12 | 33 | Qualification for Finals |
| 5 | Adelaide Hills Hawks | 22 | 9 | 6 | 7 | 30 | 25 | +5 | 33 | Qualification for Finals |
| 6 | Noarlunga United | 22 | 10 | 3 | 9 | 28 | 39 | −11 | 33 | |
| 7 | Northern Demons | 22 | 9 | 3 | 10 | 47 | 33 | +14 | 30 | |
| 8 | Enfield City | 21 | 7 | 3 | 11 | 25 | 39 | −14 | 24 | |
| 9 | Salisbury United | 21 | 4 | 10 | 7 | 24 | 33 | −9 | 22 | |
| 10 | Adelaide Cobras | 22 | 4 | 4 | 14 | 24 | 62 | −38 | 16 | |
| 11 | South Adelaide | 22 | 4 | 3 | 15 | 18 | 58 | −40 | 15 | |
| 12 | Seaford Rangers | 22 | 3 | 4 | 15 | 20 | 53 | −33 | 13 | |

(C) Champions; (P) Promoted

^{N.B.} Two matches in the final round weren't played.

=== Finals ===
Elimination and Qualifying Finals
2 | Para Hills Knights | 5
3 | Cumberland United | 0
4 | Western Strikers | 1
5 | Adelaide Hills | 2

Semifinals
1 | West Torrens Birkalla | 1 (3)
2 | Para Hills Knights | 1 (5)
3 | Cumberland United | 0
5 | Adelaide Hills | 2

Preliminary Final
1 | West Torrens Birkalla | 4
5 | Adelaide Hills | 2

Grand Final
1 | West Torrens Birkalla | 1
2 | Para Hills Knights | 0

== See also ==
- 2001 SASF Premier League
- 2001 SASF State League
- National Premier Leagues South Australia
- Football Federation South Australia
