= 2002 SASF season =

South Australian Soccer Federation
- Season: 2002
- Champions: Adelaide Raiders

The 2002 South Australian Soccer Federation season was the 96th season of soccer in South Australia.

== 2002 SASF Premier League ==
South Australian Premier League
- Season: 2002
- Champions: Grand Final; Adelaide Raiders; Minor Premiership; Adelaide Galaxy
- Relegated: Campbelltown City; Port Adelaide Lion
- Matches: 132
- Biggest home win: Adelaide Blue Eagles 8–0 Port Adelaide Lion (6 July 2002)
- Biggest away win: Port Adelaide Lion 0–10 Adelaide Blue Eagles (20 April 2002)
- Highest scoring: Port Adelaide Lion 0–10 Adelaide Blue Eagles (20 April 2002); Para Hills Knights 1–9 Adelaide Blue Eagles (22 June 2002) (10 goals)

The 2002 South Australian Premier League season was the top level domestic association football competition in South Australia for 2002. It was contested by 12 teams in a single 22 round league format, each team playing all of their opponents twice.

| Pos | Team | Pld | W | D | L | GF | GA | GD | Pts | Qualification or relegation |
|---|---|---|---|---|---|---|---|---|---|---|
| 1 | Adelaide Galaxy | 22 | 18 | 1 | 3 | 59 | 16 | +43 | 55 | Qualification for Finals |
| 2 | Adelaide Blue Eagles | 22 | 15 | 4 | 3 | 71 | 20 | +51 | 49 | Qualification for Finals |
| 3 | North Eastern MetroStars | 22 | 10 | 7 | 5 | 38 | 24 | +14 | 37 | Qualification for Finals |
| 4 | Adelaide Raiders (C) | 22 | 10 | 6 | 6 | 46 | 28 | +18 | 36 | Qualification for Finals |
| 5 | Playford City | 22 | 9 | 8 | 5 | 38 | 28 | +10 | 35 | Qualification for Finals |
| 6 | Adelaide Olympic | 22 | 9 | 6 | 7 | 36 | 33 | +3 | 33 | |
| 7 | Modbury Jets | 22 | 7 | 7 | 8 | 27 | 28 | −1 | 28 | |
| 8 | White City | 22 | 7 | 6 | 9 | 35 | 33 | +2 | 27 | |
| 9 | Para Hills Knights | 22 | 6 | 6 | 10 | 26 | 53 | −27 | 24 | |
| 10 | Adelaide City | 22 | 5 | 5 | 12 | 37 | 52 | −15 | 20 | |
| 11 | Campbelltown City (R) | 22 | 2 | 8 | 12 | 23 | 37 | −14 | 14 | Relegation to SASF State League |
| 12 | Port Adelaide Lion (R) | 22 | 1 | 2 | 19 | 8 | 92 | −84 | 5 | Relegation to SASF State League |

(C) Champions; (R) Relegated

=== Finals ===
Elimination and Qualifying Finals
2 | Adelaide Blue Eagles | 6
3 | North Eastern MetroStars | 0
4 | Adelaide Raiders | 1
5 | Playford City Patriots | 0

Semifinals
1 | Adelaide Galaxy | 1
2 | Adelaide Blue Eagles | 2
3 | North Eastern MetroStars | 1
4 | Adelaide Raiders | 2

Preliminary Final
1 | Adelaide Galaxy | 0
4 | Adelaide Raiders | 1

Grand Final
2 | Adelaide Blue Eagles | 1
4 | Adelaide Raiders | 2

== 2002 SASF State League ==
South Australian State League
- Season: 2002
- Promoted: Croydon Kings; Enfield City
- Matches: 132
- Biggest home win: Noarlunga United 7–1 Seaford Rangers (15 March 2002); South Adelaide 6–0 Seaford Rangers (30 March 2002)
- Biggest away win: Salisbury United 1–7 Enfield City (13 April 2002)
- Highest scoring: Enfield City 7–2 Seaford Rangers (13 July 2002) (9 goals)

The 2002 South Australian State League season was the second highest domestic level association football competition in South Australia. It was contested by 12 teams in a single 22 round league format, each team playing all of their opponents twice.

| Pos | Team | Pld | W | D | L | GF | GA | GD | Pts | Promotion or qualification |
|---|---|---|---|---|---|---|---|---|---|---|
| 1 | Croydon Kings (C, P) | 22 | 15 | 4 | 3 | 47 | 16 | +31 | 49 | Promotion to SASF Premier League |
| 2 | Cumberland United | 22 | 15 | 3 | 4 | 47 | 14 | +33 | 48 | Qualification for Finals |
| 3 | Enfield City (P) | 22 | 14 | 4 | 4 | 68 | 33 | +35 | 46 | Qualification for Finals |
| 4 | Noarlunga United | 22 | 12 | 4 | 6 | 44 | 32 | +12 | 40 | Qualification for Finals |
| 5 | Northern Demons | 22 | 10 | 6 | 6 | 48 | 38 | +10 | 36 | Qualification for Finals |
| 6 | Adelaide Hills Hawks | 22 | 9 | 6 | 7 | 29 | 20 | +9 | 33 | |
| 7 | Port Pirie City | 22 | 10 | 3 | 9 | 36 | 37 | −1 | 33 | |
| 8 | Adelaide Cobras | 22 | 9 | 4 | 9 | 36 | 38 | −2 | 31 | |
| 9 | Western Strikers | 22 | 8 | 3 | 11 | 36 | 45 | −9 | 27 | |
| 10 | Salisbury United | 22 | 4 | 4 | 14 | 23 | 44 | −21 | 16 | |
| 11 | South Adelaide | 22 | 1 | 5 | 16 | 23 | 56 | −33 | 8 | |
| 12 | Seaford Rangers | 22 | 1 | 2 | 19 | 21 | 85 | −64 | 5 | |

(C) Champions; (P) Promoted

=== Finals ===
Elimination and Qualifying Finals
2 | Cumberland United
3 | Enfield City
4 | Noarlunga United
5 | Northern Demons

Semifinals
1 | Croydon Kings

Preliminary Final

Grand Final
1 | Croydon Kings | 3
3 | Enfield City | 2

== See also ==
- 2002 SASF Premier League
- 2002 SASF State League
- National Premier Leagues South Australia
- Football Federation South Australia
