= 1991 SASF season =

South Australian Soccer Federation
- Season: 1991

The 1991 South Australian Soccer Federation season was the 85th season of soccer in South Australia.

== 1991 SASF Division One ==
SASF Division One
- Season: 1991
- Champions: West Adelaide Hellas (10th title)
- Matches: 132
- Goals: 372 (2.82 per match)

The 1991 South Australian Division One season was the 85th season of first division soccer in South Australia.

West Adelaide Hellas were champions for the 10th time. Blackwood were relegated. West Adelaide Hellas and Adelaide City both withdrew from SASF competitions at the end of the season.

=== League Table ===
Pos	Team	Pld	W	D	L	GF	GA	GD	Pts	Qualification or relegation
1	West Adelaide Hellas (C)	22	16	4	2	61	16	+45	36	Qualification for Top Four Cup and withdrew at end of season
2	Salisbury United	22	11	9	2	45	20	+25	31	Qualification for Top Four Cup
3	Para Hills	22	11	4	7	38	31	+7	26	Qualification for Top Four Cup
4	Adelaide Croatia	22	10	4	8	38	30	+8	24	Qualification for Top Four Cup
5	Adelaide City	22	10	6	6	39	28	+11	23 (Note: Adelaide City had 3 competition points removed for fielding ineligible players.)	Withdrew at end of season
6	Eastern Districts Azzurri	22	8	6	8	29	22	+7	22	
7	West Torrens Birkalla	22	9	3	10	20	29	−9	21	
8	Modbury Jets	22	4	11	7	20	23	−3	19	
9	Polonia Adelaide	22	7	3	12	31	38	−7	17	
10	Beograd Woodville	22	6	7	9	20	32	−12	17 (Note: Beograd Woodville had 2 competition points removed for fielding ineligible players.)	
11	Lion-Grange	22	5	5	12	18	43	−25	15	
12	Blackwood (R)	22	2	4	16	13	60	−47	8	Relegation to SASF Division Two

Source: socceraust
Rules for classification: 1) points; 2) goal difference; 3) number of goals scored.
(C) Champions; (R) Relegated

== 1991 SASF Division Two ==
SASF Division Two
- Season: 1991
- Champions: Elizabeth City (3rd title)
- Matches: 90
- Goals: 231 (2.57 per match)

The 1991 South Australian Division Two season was the 67th season of second division soccer in South Australia.

Elizabeth City were champions for the third time, and were promoted.

=== League Table ===
Pos	Team	Pld	W	D	L	GF	GA	GD	Pts	Promotion
1	Elizabeth City (C, P)	18	11	4	3	29	13	+16	26	Promotion to SASF Division One
2	Olympians	18	9	6	3	32	18	+14	24	
3	Central Districts APAC	18	7	7	4	29	20	+9	21	
4	Seaford Rangers	18	8	3	7	28	22	+6	19	
5	Port Adelaide	18	7	3	8	21	21	0	17	
6	Campbelltown City	18	7	3	8	23	32	−9	17	
7	Cumberland United	18	3	10	5	16	19	−3	16	
8	Adelaide Omonia	18	5	5	8	16	24	−8	15	
9	Noarlunga United	18	4	5	9	19	28	−9	13	
10	Enfield City Falcons	18	5	2	11	18	34	−16	12	

Source: socceraust
Rules for classification: 1) points; 2) goal difference; 3) number of goals scored.
(C) Champions; (P) Promoted

== 1991 Top Four Cup ==
The 1991 Top Four Cup, known as the 1991 Coca-Cola Cup for sponsorship reasons, was the 23rd and final edition of the Top Four Cup, a post-season knockout competition contested by the top four teams from the Division One season.

Salisbury United won the competition for the first time.
