= Football South Australia =

Governing body for soccer in South Australia

- Abbreviation: FSA
- Predecessor: South Australian Soccer Federation
- Formation: 2006
- Type: State Sporting Association
- Legal status: Active
- Headquarters: State Centre for Football, Gepps Cross
- Location: South Australia
- Region served: South Australia, Australia
- President: Dr Jane Rathjen (2024–)
- CEO: Michael Carter (2008–)
- Affiliations: Football Australia
- Funding: Football Australia; Government of South Australia
- Website: footballsa.com.au

Football South Australia (FSA) is the governing body of soccer in the state of South Australia. It was established in 2006 under the name Football Federation South Australia (FFSA), which succeeded the former organisation, the South Australian Soccer Federation (SASF).

FSA oversees the highest levels of soccer in South Australia, as well as collaborating with regional competitions and amateur leagues, and organise the Football SA Federation Cup.

== History ==
Location of teams located inside the Adelaide Metropolitan Area.
Location of teams located outside of the Adelaide metropolitan area.

The first South Australian soccer organisation was the South Australian British Football Association (SABFA), which was founded in 1902. The inaugural official South Australian soccer competition took place in 1903, featuring three teams: North Adelaide, South Adelaide, and Woodville. In 1924, the association's name was changed to the South Australian Soccer Football Association (SASFA).

In 1961, the association split into SASFA and the South Australian Soccer League (SASL), but the following year, merged to form the South Australian Soccer Federation (SASF), which continued to operate until 2006.

In 2006 the Football Federation South Australia (FFSA) was established. In 2020, following the renaming of Football Federation Australia to Football Australia, South Australia's federation adopted the name Football South Australia.

== Description and functions ==
Football South Australia is affiliated with Football Australia, the national governing body.

FSA oversees the highest levels of football in South Australia, including the National Premier Leagues South Australia, State League 1 South Australia, and State League 2 South Australia. They also work in conjunction with South Australia's regional competitions and amateur leagues. Many teams from these various leagues participate in the Federation Cup, which determines the South Australian representatives for the Australia Cup.

Football South Australia also manages the Junior Premier League (JPL) and Junior State League (JSL), providing opportunities for teams in age groups ranging from under 6s to under 17s to compete on Sundays.

FSA holds the annual African Nations Cup of South Australia in partnership with the African Communities Council of South Australia, which is held at the ServiceFM Stadium.

=== National Training Centre ===
Football SA National Training Centre (NTC) programs "aim is to provide talented boys and girls with the opportunity to develop their skills and ability through a game-related approach to training". The FSA NTC teams have a high turnover owing to their nature as a training team for players, but the women's team reached their first ever grand final in 2023, after beating the Adelaide Comets.

=== Women's National Premier Leagues South Australia ===
The Women's National Premier Leagues South Australia (WNPL) represents the second tier of the sport, below A-League Women.

== Clubs ==
=== Men's teams ===
Port Adelaide Pirates are the oldest team still in existence in South Australia, being founded in 1903, and competing in the 1904 season.

In 1933, Birkalla Rovers were founded, which would later amalgamate with a West Torrens team to form West Torrens Birkalla. Alongside Adelaide University, these are the only South Australian clubs with history dating back to before World War II.

Following World War II, Australia was a particular hotspot for immigration by those who had been displaced by the war. These immigrants would found multiple clubs that have survived to the current day: Juventus in 1946, Beograd in 1949, Polonia in 1950, Croatia in 1952, Napoli in 1958 and Hellas in 1962. Other notable clubs founded during this period, now defunct, are: Burnside Budapest, which later merged with Campbelltown City to become Campbelltown Budapest; and Ukrainian SC Lion, which later merged with Port Adelaide to become Port Adelaide Lion, and now continue to participate in the South Australian Amateur Soccer League.

Adelaide City are the most successful club in history, having won 3 National Soccer League championships, 19 first division championships and 18 Federation Cups. Clubs can apply to enter the State League 2 competitions when a space is available, with the team being in one of the regional leagues or the amateur league.

The most recent teams to have joined being Pontian Eagles in 2020, Modbury Vista in 2017, Fulham United and Vipers FC both in 2016, the latter two having won promotion to State League 1.

==== 2026 Season ====
National Premier Leagues South Australia
| Team | Suburb | Home Ground | Founded | Joined | Chmp | Prem | Cup | Head coach |
|---|---|---|---|---|---|---|---|---|
| Adelaide City | Oakden | Adelaide City Park | 1946 | 1946 | 19 | 3 | 18 | Paul Pezos |
| Adelaide Comets | Gepps Cross | ServiceFM Stadium | 1994 | 2006 | 0 | 2 | 1 | George Tsonis |
| Adelaide United Youth | Gepps Cross | ServiceFM Stadium | 2008 | 2015 | 1 | 0 | N/A | Airton Andrioli |
| Campbelltown City | Newton | Steve Woodcock Sports Centre | 1963 | 1964 | 6 | 2 | 3 | Michael Matricciani |
| Croydon FC | Regency Park | Regency Oval | 1950 | 1952 | 6 | 1 | 7 | Travis Dodd |
| FK Beograd | Woodville West | Frank Mitchell Park | 1949 | 1950 | 2 | 1 | 5 | Joshua Smith |
| North Eastern MetroStars | Klemzig | T.K. Shutter Reserve | 1994 | 1999 | 3 | 11 | 6 | Danny Graystone |
| Para Hills Knights | Para Hills West | The Paddocks | 1964 | 1966 | 0 | 0 | 0 | Theo Tsiounis |
| Playford City Patriots | Edinburgh North | Ramsay Park | 1956 | 1958 | 0 | 0 | 1 | Ben Moore |
| Sturt Lions | Eden Hills | Karinya Reserve | 2003 | 2011 | 0 | 0 | 0 | Lino Fusco |
| West Adelaide | West Beach | West Beach Parks Football Centre | 1962 | 1963 | 11 | 1 | 3 | Jim Tsekinis |
| West Torrens Birkalla | Novar Gardens | Jack Smith Park | 1933 | 1933 | 6 | 2 | 1 | Daniel Paterson |

State League One South Australia
| Team | Suburb | Home Ground | Founded | Joined | Chmp | Prem | Cup | Head coach |
|---|---|---|---|---|---|---|---|---|
| Adelaide Atletico | Blair Athol | Rushworth Reserve | 2006 | 2015 | 0 | 0 | 0 | Rick Cerracchio |
| Adelaide Blue Eagles | Marden | Marden Sports Complex | 1958 | 1959 | 10 | 5 | 7 | Andrej Rastovac |
| Adelaide Cobras | Plympton | Pro Paint and Panel Oval | 1972 | 1989 | 0 | 0 | 0 | Robbie Ditroia |
| Adelaide Croatia Raiders | Gepps Cross | Croatian Sports Centre | 1952 | 1953 | 4 | 1 | 10 | Vlado Blazeka |
| Adelaide Olympic | Angle Park | APEX Football Stadium | 1978 | 1981 | 0 | 0 | 2 | Andrew Calderbank |
| Cove FC | Trott Park | Southern Sports Facility | 1983 | 2009 | 0 | 0 | 0 | Matt Pethick |
| Cumberland United | Clarence Gardens | A.A. Bailey Reserve | 1943 | 1943 | 2 | 0 | 3 | Terry Westwood |
| Eastern United | Athelstone | Athelstone Recreation Reserve | 2013 | 2013 | 0 | 0 | 0 | Gabriel Markaj |
| Fulham United | West Beach | West Beach Parks Football Centre | 1970 | 2016 | 0 | 0 | 0 | Tony Galanopoulos |
| Modbury Jets | Ridgehaven | Smith Partners Stadium | 1965 | 1966 | 0 | 0 | 1 | Maurice Natale |
| South Adelaide Panthers | O'Sullivan Beach | O'Sullivan Beach Sports Complex | 1997 | 1999 | 0 | 0 | 0 | Anthony Rideout |
| Salisbury United | Burton | Steve Jarvis Park | 1954 | 1955 | 1 | 0 | 0 | Matt Gaston |

State League Two South Australia – North and South
| Team | Suburb | Home Ground | Founded | Joined | Chmp | Prem | Cup | Head coach |
|---|---|---|---|---|---|---|---|---|
| Adelaide Hills Hawks | Woodside | Hawks Nest | 1991 | 1998 | 0 | 0 | 0 | Tommy Peak |
| Adelaide Titans | West Beach | West Beach Parks Football Centre | 2004 | 2025 | 0 | 0 | 0 | Daniel Paterson |
| Adelaide University | North Adelaide | University Oval | 1935 | - | 0 | 0 | 0 | Valentino Esposito |
| Angle Vale SC | Angle Vale | Angle Vale Community Sports Center | 1986 | 2026 | 0 | 0 | 0 | Aiden Oliver |
| Barossa United SC | Nuriootpa | Hoffman Oval | 1989 | 2026 | 0 | 0 | 0 | Mike Cawood |
| Elizabeth Downs SC | Elizabeth Downs | Argana Park | 1962 | 2026 | 0 | 0 | 0 | Michael McGiven |
| Elizabeth Grove SC | Elizabeth North | Dauntsey Reserve | 1963 | 2025 | 0 | 0 | 0 | Luke Hall |
| Gawler Eagles | Evanston Gardens | Karbeethan Reserve | 1978 | 2006 | 0 | 0 | 0 | Terry Frangakis |
| Ghan United | Ferryden Park | Ferryden Park Reserve | 2012 | 2025 | 0 | 0 | 0 | Rahim Shah Zaidi |
| Modbury Vista | Wynn Vale | Newspot Stadium | 1969 | 2017 | 0 | 0 | 0 | Nigel Gill |
| Mount Barker United | Mount Barker | Summit Sport and Recreation Park | 1982 | 2016 | 0 | 0 | 0 | Domenico Barilla |
| Noarlunga United | Morphett Vale | Wilfred Taylor Reserve | 1963 | 2007 | 0 | 0 | 0 | Garth Thompson |
| Northern Demons | Port Pirie | Byrne Park | 1951 | 1999 | 0 | 0 | 0 | Greg Joy |
| Plympton Bulldogs | Novar Gardens | Jack Smith Park | | 2026 | 0 | 0 | 0 | Giorgio Germanis |
| Pontian Eagles | Paralowie | Yalumba Drive Reserve | 1992 | 2020 | 0 | 0 | 0 | Omar Hussain |
| Port Adelaide Pirates | Taperoo | Ngarrpadla Josie Agius Reserve | 1903 | 1904 | 5 | 2 | 4 | Terry Westwood |
| Salisbury Inter | Salisbury North | Underdown Park | 1966 | 2025 | 0 | 0 | 0 | Peter Capone |
| Seaford Rangers | Port Noarlunga South | Karingal Reserve | 1974 | 1978 | 0 | 0 | 0 | Andrew Calderbank |
| Vipers FC | St. Clair | Evian Football Park | 2006 | 2016 | 0 | 0 | 0 | Dimitri Panagis |
| Western Strikers | Royal Park | Carnegie South Reserve | 1980 | 2006 | 0 | 0 | 1 | Robbie Ditrioa |

=== Women's teams ===
==== 2026 Season ====
Women's National Premier Leagues South Australia
| Team | Suburb | Home Ground | Founded | Joined | Chmp | Prem | Cup | Head coach |
|---|---|---|---|---|---|---|---|---|
| Adelaide City | Oakden | Adelaide City Park | | | 11 | 2 | 7 | Tiarn Powell |
| Adelaide Comets | Gepps Cross | ServiceFM Stadium | | | 0 | 1 | 1 | Tom Monsigneur |
| Adelaide University | Gepps Cross | ServiceFM Stadium | | | 4 | 0 | 3 | Tony Sacca |
| Flinders United | St Marys | Women's Memorial Playing Field | | | 0 | 0 | 0 | Joel Porter |
| Football SA NTC | Gepps Cross | ServiceFM Stadium | | | 0 | 0 | 0 | Michele Lastella |
| Fulham United | West Beach | West Beach Parks Football Centre | | | 4 | 0 | 3 | |
| North Eastern MetroStars | Klemzig | T.K. Shutter Reserve | | | 4 | 2 | 4 | Paul Morris |
| Salisbury Inter | Salisbury North | Underdown Park | | | 2 | 1 | 1 | Tony Scalzi |
| West Adelaide | West Beach | West Beach Parks Football Centre | | | 1 | 2 | 2 | Tracey Jenkins |
| West Torrens Birkalla | Novar Gardens | Jack Smith Park | | | 0 | 0 | 1 | Chris Goddard |

Women's State League South Australia
| Team | Suburb | Home Ground | Founded | Joined | Chmp | Prem | Cup | Head coach |
|---|---|---|---|---|---|---|---|---|
| Adelaide Hills Hawks | Woodside | Hawks Nest | | | 0 | 0 | 0 | Luke Hancock |
| Adelaide Jaguars | West Beach | West Beach Parks Football Centre | | | 0 | 0 | 0 | Matthew Wardhaugh |
| Campbelltown City | Newton | Steve Woodcock Sports Centre | | | 0 | 0 | 0 | Vince Pagnozzi |
| Croydon FC | Regency Park | Regency Oval | | | 0 | 0 | 0 | Mario Catalano |
| Elizabeth Grove | Elizabeth North | Dauntsey Reserve | | | 0 | 0 | 0 | Robert Dawber |
| Modbury Jets | Ridgehaven | Smith Partners Stadium | | | 1 | 0 | 2 | Luigi Pavia |
| Modbury Vista | Wynn Vale | Newspot Stadium | | | 1 | 0 | 0 | Duncan Soang |
| South Adelaide Panthers | O'Sullivan Beach | O'Sullivan Beach Sports Complex | | | 0 | 0 | 0 | Daniel Milovanovic |
| Sturt Lions | Eden Hills | Karinya Reserve | | | 0 | 0 | 0 | Nic Whiteside |
| The Cove | Marion | Club Marion | | | 0 | 0 | 0 | Carlos Carvo |

== League system ==
The soccer pyramid in South Australia comprises 4 levels below the A-League Men, with promotion and relegation between the top 3 levels. It also includes the South Australian Amateur Soccer League, which is not officially a part of the league system.

=== Men's pyramid ===
| Level | | Leagues | |
| National | State | Leagues | |
|---|---|---|---|
| 2 | 1 | National Premier Leagues South Australia; 12 clubs no promotion, ↓ relegate 2 | |
| 3 | 2 | State League 1 South Australia; 12 clubs ↑ promote 2, ↓ relegate 2 | |
| 4 | 3 | State League 2 South Australia North; 10 clubs ↑ promote 0–2, no relegation | State League 2 South Australia South; 10 clubs ↑ promote 0–2, no relegation |
| 5 | 4 | South Australian Regional Leagues; 12 divisions no promotion | |

=== Women's pyramid ===
| Level | | Leagues | |
| National | State | Leagues | |
|---|---|---|---|
| 2 | 1 | Women's National Premier Leagues South Australia; 10 clubs no promotion, ↓ relegate 1.5 | |
| 3 | 2 | Women's State League South Australia; 8 clubs ↑ promote 1.5, no relegation | |
| — | — | Women's Community Leagues South Australia; 7 divisions no promotion | |
| — | — | Community Division 1; 10 teams | |
| — | — | Community Division 2; 11 teams | |
| — | — | Community Division 3; 10 teams | |
| — | — | Community Division 4 North; 9 teams | Community Division 4 South; 10 teams |
| — | — | Community Division 5 North; 11 teams | Community Division 5 South; 9 teams |

== Season winners ==
| Year | Men's Champions | Men's Premiers | Women's Champions |
|---|---|---|---|
| 2026 | Adelaide City | Adelaide City | |
| 2025 | Croydon FC | North Eastern MetroStars | |
| 2024 | Campbelltown City | North Eastern MetroStars | Salisbury Inter |
| 2023 | Adelaide United Youth | North Eastern MetroStars | Salisbury Inter |
| 2022 | Adelaide City | Adelaide City | West Adelaide |
| 2021 | Adelaide City | Adelaide Comets | Salisbury Inter |
| 2020 | Campbelltown City | Adelaide Comets | Metro United |
| 2019 | Campbelltown City | Campbelltown City | Adelaide City |
| 2018 | Campbelltown City | Campbelltown City | Adelaide City |
| 2017 | Croydon Kings | North Eastern MetroStars (Note: Following a sanction by the independent Disciplinary Committee, Adelaide City had 18 competition points removed, resulting in the loss of the League Premiers title.) | Adelaide City |
| 2016 | Campbelltown City | Adelaide City | Metro United |
| 2015 | West Adelaide | West Adelaide | Metro United |
| 2014 | Croydon Kings | North Eastern MetroStars | Adelaide City |
| 2013 | Campbelltown City | North Eastern MetroStars | Adelaide City |
| 2012 | North Eastern MetroStars | Croydon Kings | Adelaide City |
| 2011 | Adelaide Blue Eagles | North Eastern MetroStars | Metro United |
| 2010 | Adelaide City | North Eastern MetroStars | Adelaide City |
| 2009 | North Eastern MetroStars | North Eastern MetroStars | Adelaide City |
| 2008 | Adelaide City | Adelaide City | Sturt Marion |
| 2007 | Adelaide City | – | Fulham United |
| 2006 | Adelaide City | – | Fulham United |
Prior to Football Federation South Australia
| 2005 | Adelaide City | North Eastern MetroStars | Fulham United |
| 2004 | North Eastern MetroStars | North Eastern MetroStars | Fulham United |
| 2003 | Adelaide Blue Eagles | North Eastern MetroStars | Adelaide City |
| 2002 | Adelaide Raiders | Adelaide Galaxy | Adelaide City |
| 2001 | Adelaide Blue Eagles | Adelaide Blue Eagles | North Eastern MetroStars |
| 2000 | Adelaide Blue Eagles | Adelaide Blue Eagles | N.A.B. |
| 1999 | Cumberland United | Port Adelaide Lion | Adelaide City |
| 1998 | West Torrens Birkalla | West Torrens Birkalla | Modbury Northern All Blacks |
| 1997 | Adelaide Raiders | Adelaide Raiders | Sturt Marion |
| 1996 | Adelaide Blue Eagles | White City Woodville | Sturt Marion |
| 1995 | Adelaide Blue Eagles | Adelaide Blue Eagles | Sturt Marion |
| 1994 | Adelaide Blue Eagles | Port Adelaide Lion | Sturt Marion |
| 1993 | White City Woodville | Adelaide Blue Eagles | Modbury Vista |
| 1992 | Eastern Districts Azzurri | Eastern Districts Azzurri | Modbury Jets |
| 1991 | West Adelaide Hellas | – | Brahma Lodge |
| 1990 | West Adelaide Hellas | – | Adelaide College |
| 1989 | West Adelaide Hellas | – | – |
| 1988 | Adelaide Croatia | – | Adelaide College |
| 1987 | West Adelaide Hellas | – | Adelaide University Dinamo |
| 1986 | Campbelltown City | – | Adelaide University Dinamo |
| 1985 | Salisbury United | – | Adelaide University Dinamo |
| 1984 | Adelaide Croatia | – | Adelaide University Dinamo |
| 1983 | Polonia Adelaide | – | Adelaide Croatia |
| 1982 | Eastern Districts Azzurri | – | Adelaide Croatia |
| 1981 | Eastern Districts Azzurri | – | Adelaide College |
| 1980 | Adelaide Croatia | – | Salisbury United |
| 1979 | Beograd Woodville | – | Adelaide College |
| 1978 | Cumberland United | – | Salisbury United |
| 1977 | Polonia Adelaide | – | |
| 1976 | West Adelaide Hellas | – | |
| 1975 | Polonia Adelaide | – | |
| 1974 | Adelaide Juventus | – | |
| 1973 | West Adelaide Hellas | – | |
| 1972 | Adelaide Juventus | – | |
| 1971 | West Adelaide Hellas | – | |
| 1970 | Adelaide Juventus | – | |
| 1969 | West Adelaide Hellas | – | |
| 1968 | West Adelaide Hellas | – | |
| 1967 | Adelaide Juventus | – | |
| 1966 | West Adelaide Hellas | – | |
| 1965 | USC Lion | – | |
| 1964 | Adelaide Juventus | – | |
| 1963 | Adelaide Juventus | – | |
| 1962 | Burnside Budapest | – | |
| 1961 | Burnside Budapest | – | |
| 1960 | Burnside Budapest | – | |
| 1959 | Adelaide Juventus | – | |
| 1958 | Adelaide Juventus | – | |
| 1957 | Adelaide Juventus | – | |
| 1956 | Adelaide Juventus | – | |
| 1955 | Polonia Adelaide | – | |
| 1954 | Adelaide Juventus | – | |
| 1953 | Adelaide Juventus | – | |
| 1952 | Birkalla Rovers | – | |
| 1951 | Birkalla Rovers | – | |
| 1950 | Birkalla Rovers | – | |
| 1949 | Sturt | – | |
| 1948 | Birkalla Rovers | – | |
| 1947 | Birkalla Rovers | – | |
| 1946 | Kingswood | – | |
| 1945 | Birkalla Rovers | – | |
| 1944 | Birkalla Rovers | – | |
| 1943 | Northumberland & Durham | – | |
| 1942 | Not held due to World War II | | |
| 1941 | West Torrens | – | |
| 1940 | Sturt | – | |
| 1939 | West Torrens | – | |
| 1938 | Northumberland & Durham | – | |
| 1937 | Port Thistle | – | |
| 1936 | West Torrens | – | |
| 1935 | Port Thistle | – | |
| 1934 | Port Thistle | – | |
| 1933 | Kingswood | – | |
| 1932 | West Torrens | – | |
| 1931 | Port Adelaide | – | |
| 1930 | West Adelaide | – | |
| 1929 | West Torrens | – | |
| 1928 | West Torrens | – | |
| 1927 | Port Adelaide | – | |
| 1926 | Port Adelaide | – | |
| 1925 | West Torrens | – | |
| 1924 | Hindmarsh | – | |
| 1923 | Cheltenham | – | |
| 1922 | North Adelaide | – | |
| 1921 | Cheltenham | – | |
| 1920 | Cheltenham | – | |
| 1919 | North Adelaide | – | |
| 1918 | Not held due to World War I | | |
| 1917 | Not held due to World War I | | |
| 1916 | Not held due to World War I | | |
| 1915 | Cheltenham | – | |
| 1914 | North Adelaide | – | |
| 1913 | Hindmarsh | – | |
| 1912 | Port Adelaide | – | |
| 1911 | Port Adelaide | – | |
| 1910 | Cambridge | – | |
| 1909 | Hindmarsh | – | |
| 1908 | Hindmarsh | – | |
| 1907 | Hindmarsh | – | |
| 1906 | North Adelaide | – | |
| 1905 | Hindmarsh | – | |
| 1904 | Woodville | – | |
| 1903 | North Adelaide | – | |

=== Performance by club ===
Over the history of South Australian soccer, 26 different clubs have won the title. The most successful club is Adelaide City, with 20 titles to its credit, 8 of those coming since their return from the National Soccer League in 2004.

Clubs in bold currently play in the top division, and clubs in italics no longer compete in semi-professional competitions or are defunct.

| Club | Other names | Champions | Runners-up | Championship seasons | Runners-up seasons |
|---|---|---|---|---|---|
| **Adelaide City** | Adelaide Juventus | 20 | 16 | 1953, 1954, 1956, 1957, 1958, 1959, 1963, 1964, 1967, 1970, 1972, 1974, 2005, 2006, 2007, 2008, 2010, 2021, 2022, 2026 | 1950, 1952, 1955, 1961, 1962, 1966, 1971, 1973, 1975, 1976, 2009, 2011, 2012, 2016, 2017, 2018 |
| West Adelaide | West Adelaide Hellas | 11 | 4 | 1966, 1968, 1969, 1971, 1973, 1976, 1987, 1989, 1990, 1991, 2015 | 1967, 1972, 1974, 1988 |
| Adelaide Blue Eagles | Eastern Districts Azzurri | 10 | 6 | 1981, 1982, 1992, 1994, 1995, 1996, 2000, 2001, 2003, 2011 | 1978, 1985, 2002, 2010, 2013, 2015 |
| Port Adelaide Pirates | Port Adelaide; Port Adelaide Lion; Port Thistle | 8 | 9 | 1911, 1912, 1926, 1927, 1931, 1934, 1935, 1937 | 1908, 1910, 1925, 1929, 1932, 1936, 1949, 1953, 1999 |
| West Torrens Birkalla | Birkalla Rovers; Adelaide Galaxy | 7 | 12 | 1944, 1945, 1947, 1950, 1951, 1952, 1998 | 1984, 1989, 1993, 1997, 2006, 2026 |
| West Torrens (Note: A separate team to the one that merged with Birkalla Rovers. West Torrens Birkalla was formed by the amalgamation of Birkalla Rovers with a different team called West Torrens.) | | 7 | 6 | 1925, 1928, 1929, 1932, 1936, 1939, 1941 | 1927, 1931, 1933, 1934, 1935, 1945 |
| **Campbelltown City** | Campbelltown Budapest | 7 | 1 | 1986, 2013, 2016, 2018, 2019, 2020, 2024 | 1994 |
| Birkalla Rovers | | 6 | 6 | 1944, 1945, 1947, 1950, 1951, 1952 | 1938, 1939, 1940, 1946, 1948, 1961 |
| Hindmarsh | | 6 | 2 | 1905, 1907, 1908, 1909, 1913, 1924 | 1914, 1915 |
| **Adelaide Croatia Raiders** | Adelaide Croatia; Adelaide Raiders | 5 | 9 | 1980, 1984, 1988, 1997, 2002 | 1965, 1969, 1983, 1986, 1990, 1992, 1995, 2005, 2007 |
| **Croydon FC** | Polonia Adelaide | 5 | 7 | 1955, 1975, 1977, 2014, 2017 | 1957, 1958, 1968, 1970, 1981, 1982, 1998 |
| North Adelaide | | 5 | 4 | 1903, 1906, 1914, 1919, 1922 | 1905, 1920, 1921, 1924 |
| **North Eastern MetroStars** | | 4 | 4 | 2004, 2009, 2012, 2025 | 2003, 2008, 2014, 2024 |
| Cheltenham | | 4 | 2 | 1915, 1920, 1921, 1923 | 1913, 1922 |
| Sturt | | 3 | 6 | 1940, 1948, 1949 | 1919, 1926, 1928, 1937, 1941, 1947 |
| Burnside Budapest | Budapest | 3 | 4 | 1960, 1961, 1962 | 1954, 1959, 1963, 1964 |
| **FK Beograd** | Beograd; Beograd Woodville; White City Woodville | 3 | 2 | 1979, 1983, 1993 | 1977, 1996 |
| Northumberland & Durham | | 2 | 1 | 1938, 1943 | 1944 |
| Cumberland United | | 2 | 1 | 1978, 1999 | 1979 |
| Kingswood | | 2 | — | 1933, 1946 | |
| Cambridge | | 1 | 3 | 1910 | 1906, 1907, 1909 |
| U.S.C. Lion | Lion-Grange | 1 | 2 | 1965 | 1956, 1960 |
| Salisbury United | | 1 | 2 | 1985 | 1987, 1991 |
| Woodville | | 1 | — | 1904 | |
| West Adelaide | | 1 | — | 1930 | |
| Victoria | | 1 | — | 1961 | |
| **Adelaide United Youth** | | 1 | — | 2023 | |
| **Adelaide Comets** | | — | 4 | | 2019, 2020, 2021, 2022 |
| South Adelaide | | — | 3 | | 1903, 1904, 1923 |
| **Modbury Jets** | | — | 3 | | 2000, 2001, 2023 |
| Railways | | — | 2 | | 1930, 1943 |
| Adelaide | | — | 1 | | 1912 |
| Windsor Athletic | Woodside United | — | 1 | | 1951 |
| **Para Hills Knights** | | — | 1 | | 1980 |
| **Adelaide Olympic** | Olympians | — | 1 | | 2004 |
