= South Australian Regional Leagues =

- Country: Australia
- Promotion to: None

The South Australian Regional Leagues are the fourth tier of soccer in South Australia, and the fifth nationally. The league consists of four separate regional senior leagues and is administered by the Football South Australia.

There is no promotion to State League 2 South Australia, however clubs may apply to join.

== Clubs ==
Clubs in the different districts in 2024 are as follows:

Collegiate Soccer League Adelaide Comets Adelaide Hills Hawks Adelaide Thunder Adelaide University Black Adelaide Uni Grads Blue Adelaide Uni Grads Red Adelaide University White Adelaide Wanderers Aldinga SC Birkalla Eagles Blackwood High School Forest Campbelltown City Cardijn Old Collegians Christian Brothers College Concordia Old Collegians Cumberland United Eastern United Flinders University Fulham United Hahndorf SC McLaren Districts Mercedes Old Collegians Mount Barker United North City Panthers Norwood SC Pembroke Old Scholars Plympton Bulldogs Port Adelaide Pirates Pulteney Old Scholars Rostrevor Old Collegians Sacred Heart Old Collegians St Paul's Old Scholars Sturt Lions UniSA FC Unley Old Scholars Vipers FC Western Strikers Westminster Old Scholars Windsor Gardens Old Collegians Woodside Warriors	Port Lincoln Soccer Association Lincoln City Raiders Lincoln Knights Sekol Masters South Coast	Riverland Soccer Association Barmera United Berri River Rangers Loxton United Renmark Olympic

Limestone Coast Football Association
Apollo FC
Blue Lake Rangers
Gambier Centrals
International SC
Millicent United
Naracoorte United
Portland Panthers
