= Anthony Costa =

Australian soccer player (born 1994)

Personal information
- Full name: Anthony Costa
- Date of birth: 1 May 1994 (age 32)
- Place of birth: Adelaide, Australia
- Position: Striker

Team information
- Current team: Adelaide Croatia Raiders

Youth career
- Adelaide City
- 2013–2014: Adelaide United

Senior career*
Years	Team	Apps	(Gls)
2011–2019	Adelaide City	166	(95)
2013–2015	Adelaide United	2	(0)
2020–2021	Marconi Stallions	13	(1)
2021	Bonnyrigg White Eagles	6	(0)
2022	Hakoah Sydney City East	16	(1)
2024–	Adelaide Croatia Raiders	5	(3)
- * Club domestic league appearances and goals as of 18 September 2024 ‡ National team caps and goals as of 3 January 2014

Anthony Costa is an Australian soccer player who plays as a striker for Bonnyrigg White Eagles.

== Career ==
=== Adelaide United ===
Costa made his debut for Adelaide United in a home match against Sydney FC. He came on as a substitute for the injured Sergio Cirio in the 31st minute. In the 72nd minute, he was fouled by Matthew Jurman in the box, and the resulting penalty kick was converted by Jake Barker-Daish, giving Adelaide the lead. However, 10 minutes later Corey Gameiro equalised for Sydney and the game ended with the scores level.

Costa was awarded the 'Youth Team Highest Goal Scorer' award for the 2013–14 season.
