= South Australian Amateur Soccer League =

- Founded: 4 April 1965
- First season: 1965 (South Australian Sunday Industrial League)
- Country: Australia
- Number of clubs: 125 (from 78 clubs)
- Current champions: Saturday League; Modbury Jets Amateurs; Sunday League; Elizabeth Downs (2023)
- Website: http://www.saasl.com.au/

The South Australian Amateur Soccer League (SAASL) is a group of amateur soccer competitions in South Australia. It consists of seven divisions on Saturday, and eight divisions on Sunday. The competition was founded in 1965 as the South Australian Sunday Industrial League (SASIL), when the concept of playing sport on a Sunday was considered taboo.

== Saturday competitions (2023) ==
| Premier Division Adelaide Red Blue Eagles Adelaide Titans BOSA Elizabeth Grove Modbury Jets Amateurs Old Ignatians Pitbulls South Coast United Sturt Marion USC Lion | Division Two Adelaide University Amateurs Croydon Cougars East Adelaide Gleeson Messinian Association Hawks Monarchs Salisbury Sharks Salisbury Villa Stirling District St Peters Old Collegians | Division Three Adelaide Blue Eagles Amateurs Adelaide Dragon FC Adelaide Dragon SC Adelaide Pumas Brothers United Barossa United FIZI Murray Bridge Northern Wolves | Division Four Esplanadle United Angle Vale 2 BIH United Summit Old Ignatians 2 One Tree Hill Prince Alfred Southern Breakers Strathalbyn Strikers Zomi United | Division Six Adelaide Blue Eagles Amateurs 2 Adelaide Pumas 2 Adelaide University Amateurs 2 East Adelaide 2 Gleeson 2 Messinian Association Hawks 2 Monarchs 2 Stirling District 2 St Peters Old Collegians 2 Salisbury Sharks 2 | Division Seven Adelaide Red Blue Eagles 2 Adelaide Titans 2 BOSA 2 Gleeson 3 Messinian Association Hawks 3 Modbury Jets Amateurs 5 Old Ignatians 3 Pitbulls 2 USC Lion 2 |

== Sunday Competitions (2023) ==
| Division One Elizabeth Downs Ghan Kilburn City Ingle Farm Parafield Gardens Para Hills East Para Hills West Salisbury Inter Savoy Tea Tree Gully City Unley United | Division Two Angle Vale Elizabeth Vale FK Beograd Amateurs Modbury Jets Amateurs 2 Noarlunga United Amateurs Para Hills United Rowe Park United Southern Knights West Adelaide Amateurs West Beach | Division Three Adelaide Atletico Adelaide Eagles Maiwand Modbury Vista Amateurs Munno Para NE MetroStars Amateurs Seaford Rangers Amateurs Shaheed Bhagat Singh Virginia United Western United | Division Four Adelaide Croatia Vukovi Adelaide Khukuri Athelstone Blue City Dragon Warriors Macedonia United Lions Payneham Postel Lions Unito Adelaide Westwood | Division Five Angle Vale 3 Elizabeth Vale 2 Modbury Jets Amateurs 3 Para Hills United 2 Rowe Park United 2 Seaford Rangers Amateurs 2 The Cove Amateurs West Adelaide Amateurs 2 West Beach 2 | Division Six Adelaide Khukuri 2 Andrews Farm Blue City 2 Modbury Jets Amateurs 4 Modbury Vista Amateurs 2 Munno Para 2 NE MetroStars Amateurs 2 Salisbury Villa 2 Tea Tree Gully City 2 Virginia United 2 | Division Seven 1836 Adelaide Elizabeth Downs 2 Elephant Warriors Para Hills United 3 Para Hills West 2 Rowe Park United 3 Salisbury Inter 2 Tea Tree Gully City 2 West Adelaide Amateurs 3 |

== Champions ==
| Year | Saturday | Sunday | Challenge Cup |
|---|---|---|---|
| 1965 | − | General Motors Holden (1) | − |
| 1966 | − | Munno Para APAC (1) | Munno Para APAC (1) |
| 1967 | − | Elizabeth Thistle (1) | Munno Para APAC (2) |
| 1968 | − | Munno Para APAC (2) | Hectorville YCW (1) |
| 1969 | − | Munno Para APAC (3) | Munno Para APAC (3) |
| 1970 | − | Munno Para APAC (4) | Munno Para APAC (4) |
| 1971 | − | Munno Para APAC (5) | Munno Para APAC (5) |
| 1972 | − | West Beach (1) | NAA Appollo XI (1) |
| 1973 | − | Parafield Gardens (1) | Elizabeth Vale (1) |
| 1974 | − | MU Findon (1) | Parafield Gardens (1) |
| 1975 | − | Parafield Gardens (2) | Parafield Gardens (2) |
| 1976 | − | MU Findon (2) | MU Findon (1) |
| 1977 | − | MU Findon (3) | Elizabeth Vale (2) |
| 1978 | − | Salisbury Inter (1); Parafield Gardens (3) | Salisbury Inter (1) |
| 1979 | − | Salisbury Inter (2) | Tubemakers (1) |
| 1980 | − | MU Findon (4) | Parafield Gardens (3) |
| 1981 | − | Salisbury Inter (3) | Tea Tree Gully (1) |
| 1982 | − | Salisbury Inter (4) | MU Findon (2) |
| 1983 | − | Tea Tree Gully (1) | Salisbury Inter (2) |
| 1984 | Veneto (1) | Salisbury Inter (5) | Tubemakers (2) |
| 1985 | Veneto (2) | Salisbury Inter (6) | Tea Tree Gully (2) |
| 1986 | Woodville (1) | Tea Tree Gully (2) | Adelaide United (1) |
| 1987 | Christian Bros. (1) | Croydon Park (1) | Croydon Park (1) |
| 1988 | Christian Bros. (2) | Tea Tree Gully (3) | Salisbury Inter (3) |
| 1989 | Christian Bros. (3) | Salisbury Inter (7) | Rostrevor United (1) |
| 1990 | Adelaide Rodos (1) | Salisbury Inter (8) | Salisbury Inter (4) |
| 1991 | SAIA (1) | The Cove (1) | Salisbury Inter (5) |
| 1992 | SAIA (2) | Para Hills East (1) | Salisbury Inter (6) |
| 1993 | Christian Bros. (4) | Para Hills East (2) | Para Hills East (1) |
| 1994 | Adelaide Hellenic (1) | Para Hills East (3) | Salisbury Inter (7) |
| 1995 | Eastern Suburbs Marche (1) | N.A.B. (1) | Elizabeth Downs (1) |
| 1996 | Adelaide Hellenic (2) | Elizabeth Vale (1) | N.A.B. (1) |
| 1997 | Adelaide Raiders (1) | Elizabeth Vale (2) | Elizabeth Grove (1) |
| 1998 | St. Peter's Old Collegians (1) | Elizabeth Vale (3) | Salisbury Inter (8) |
| 1999 | St. Peter's Old Collegians (2) | Macedonia (1) | Elizabeth Vale (3) |
| 2000 | University of Adelaide (1) | Elizabeth Vale (4) | Salisbury Villa (1) |
| 2001 | Adelaide Comets (2) | Salisbury Inter (9) | Elizabeth Vale (4) |
| 2002 | Adelaide Comets (3) | Parafield Gardens (3) | Salisbury Inter (9) |
| 2003 | Adelaide Comets (4) | Para Hills East (4) | Salisbury Inter (10) |
| 2004 | Stirling District (1) | Salisbury Inter (10) | Elizabeth Downs (2) |
| 2005 | BOSA (1) | Adelaide Villa (1) | BOSA (1) |
| 2006 | St. Peter's old Collegians (3) | Elizabeth Downs (1) | Elizabeth Vale (5) |
| 2007 | Stirling District (2) | Elizabeth Downs (2) | Elizabeth Vale (6) |
| 2008 | Adelaide Wanderers (1) | Elizabeth Vale (5) | Parafield Gardens (4) |
| 2009 | Adelaide Villa (1) | Salisbury Florina (1) | Ingle Farm (1) |
| 2010 | Adelaide Villa (2) | Parafield Gardens (4) | Parafield Gardens (5) |
| 2011 | St. Peter's Old Collegians (4) | Parafield Gardens (5) | Parafield Gardens (6) |
| 2012 | Adelaide Villa (3) | Elizabeth Downs (3) | Elizabeth Downs (3) |
| 2013 | BOSA (2) | Elizabeth Vale (6) | Parafield Gardens (7) |
| 2014 | University of Adelaide (2) | Elizabeth Downs (4) | Elizabeth Downs (4) |
| 2015 | St. Peter's Old Collegians (5) | Elizabeth Vale (8) | Ingle Farm (2) |
| 2016 | BOSA (3) | Elizabeth Vale (9) | Brahma Lodge (1) |
| 2017 | Sturt Marion (1) | Elizabeth Downs (4) | Elizabeth Downs (5) |
| 2018 | Adelaide Red Blue Eagles (1) | Elizabeth Downs (6) | Brahma Lodge (2) |
| 2019 | BOSA (4) | Brahma Lodge (1) | Para Hills West (1) |
| 2020 | − | - | − |
| 2021 | Modbury Jets Amateurs (1) | Elizabeth Downs (7) | Parafield Gardens (8) |
| 2022 | Modbury Jets Amateurs (2) | Elizabeth Downs (8) | Elizabeth Downs (6) |
| 2023 | Modbury Jets Amateurs (3) | Elizabeth Downs (9) | Para Hills East (2) |
| 2024 | Modbury Jets Amateurs (4) | Elizabeth Downs (10) | Modbury Jets Amateurs (1) |
