= Enfield City FC =

Enfield City
- Full name: Enfield City Football Club
- Nickname: Falcons
- Founded: 1946
- Dissolved: 2014
- Ground: Rushworth Reserve; Anson St, Blair Athol
- Website: http://www.enfieldcityfc.com.au
Home colours	Away colours

Enfield City Football Club was a semi-professional association football club based in Adelaide, South Australia. Enfield City played in the FFSA South Australian State League up to 2014. Their home ground was Rushworth Reserve at Blair Athol, north of Adelaide.

Enfield merged with Victoria to form Enfield Victoria in 1967, competing in the South Australian First Division in 1968. The club was known as Victoria was originally formed by German immigrants that came to Adelaide.

== Honours ==
- Premier League – Champions 2011
- State League – Champions 2009
- Premier League – Runners up 2006 & 2007
- State League – Runners up 2002
- 1st Division League Champions – 1961, 1983, 1993
- 2nd Division Champions – 1940, 1951, 1957, 1962
- 3rd Division Champions – 1960
- Federation Cup Winners – 1923, 1961
- Federation Cup Runners Up – 1924, 1953, 1961, 1965, 1966, 1980
- Ampol Cup Winners – 1963
