= Playford City SC =

Playford City
- Full name: Playford City Patriots Soccer Club
- Nickname: The Patriots
- Founded: 16 May 1956; 70 years ago
- Ground: Ramsay Park
- Capacity: 700
- Chairman: Kevin Winfield
- Manager: Ben Moore
- League: NPL South Australia
- 2026: 4th of 12
- Website: http://www.playfordpatriots.com.au/
Home colours	Away colours

Playford City Soccer Club is an association football club from Elizabeth, South Australia. Playford play in the NPL South Australia, the second-tier of Australian football. Their home ground is at Ramsay Park, Edinburgh North in the City of Playford, which is 25 km north of Adelaide, South Australia.

== Players ==
First team squad (2018)

Note: Flags indicate national team as defined under FIFA eligibility rules; some limited exceptions apply. Players may hold more than one non-FIFA nationality.

No.	Pos.	Nation	Player
1	GK	AUS	Luke Ostbye
—			
3	DF	AUS	Brayden French
—			
5	DF	AUS	Tyson Herraman
6	MF	AUS	Isaac Mullen
7	MF	COL	Santiago Tabares
—			
9	ST	AUS	Christos Pounendis
10	MF	AUS	Daniel Ryan
11	MF	AUS	Jackson Kurtz

No.	Pos.	Nation	Player
—			
—			
14	MF	NZL	Xavier Pratt
—			
—			
—			
—			
19	DF	AUS	Ben Woolard
20	DF	AUS	Ethan Algate
—			
—			
—	.		

== Club honours ==
- Federation Cup Winners: 2001
- State League Final Series Winners: 1997, 2004, 2024
- State League Runners Up: 2024
- State League Finals Series Runners Up: 2014
- 2nd Division Champions: 1970, 1974, 1991 & 2004
