= Seaford Rangers FC =

Seaford Rangers
- Full name: Seaford Rangers Football Club
- Founded: 1974; 52 years ago
- Ground: Karingal Reserve
- League: SA State League 2 South
- 2025: 4th of 8
Home colours	Away colours

Seaford Rangers (formerly the Seaford Surfers) are a soccer club from Seaford, South Australia. Seaford play in the South Australian State League. Their home ground is at Karingal Reserve.

== History ==
Noarlunga City was founded in 1970 under the name of Port Noarlunga-Christies Beach and played in the SAASL Div 4 in 1971, and played their home games at Benny Ave Port Noarlunga. In 1975 they changed their name to Noarlunga City.

The club joined the SASF competitions in 1978 as Noarlunga City and was playing their games at O'Sullivan Beach Oval. They play in predominantly white with black trim.

In 1983 Seaford Sports & Social Club merged with Noarlunga City to become Seaford Noarlunga. At this time the club started playing their games at Karingal Reserve.

The Seaford Sports & Social Club was founded in 1970 under the name of the Port Noarlunga South Progress Association but did not start playing football until the late 1970s under the name of Seaford.

In 1987 Noarlunga was dropped from the name and the club now plays under the name of Seaford.

In 2007 the club donned the name Seaford Rangers as a change from the nickname The Surfers.

The club's biggest rival is Noarlunga United with many fiery derbys played throughout the years.

In 2008 former player, Ben Dale, became the new manager, marking the beginning of Seaford's rise.

2009 was an extremely successful year for the club, narrowly losing to Northern Deamons in the 2nd elimination final (4–3 on penalties, 2–2 after ET), after finishing 4th (one point behind Northern Demons). Seaford's Dayle Anderson was the State League's top scorer with 19 league goals and was voted '88.7 Coast FM ' Talking Football ' State League Player of the Year 2009'. His strike partner, Faustin Machochi, also had a successful season, terrorising defences, scoring 14 goals and finishing runner up by one vote in the FFSA State League Player of the Year. Former player – turned Coach Ben Dale was voted FFSA ' State League – Coach of the Year '

== Club honours ==
- 2nd Division runners-up 1993

== Individual honours ==
- Ben Dale – FFSA State League Coach of the Year – 2009
- Roki Samardzija – FFSA State League goalkeeper of the year 2013
