= Salisbury United FC =

Salisbury United
- Full name: Salisbury United Football Club
- Founded: 1954; 72 years ago
- Ground: PSD Energy Park, Burton
- Capacity: 5,000
- Chairman: Charlie Morgan
- League: SA State League 1
- 2026: 11th of 12, (relegated)
- Website: https://www.salisburyunited.com.au/
Home colours	Away colours

Salisbury United Football Club is a soccer club from Salisbury, South Australia. Salisbury play in the National Premier Leagues State League 1. Their home ground is at Steve Jarvis Park, Waterloo Corner, Burton.

== Honours ==
- State League Champions: 1991; 2008; 2011
- 1st Division Champions: 1985
- 1st Division Runner-Up: 1987; 1991
- 2nd Division Champions: 1983
- 2nd Division Cup Champions: 1982
- 3rd Division Champions: 1955; 1976
- 3rd Division Runner-Up: 1968
- West End Cup Champions: 1984
- Coca-Cola Cup Champions: 1991
- Chinese Imperial Cup: 1983
- Louis Morgan Cup: 1893
- Australia Cup: 2026
