= Noarlunga United SC =

Soccer club from Adelaide, South Australia

Noarlunga United
- Full name: Noarlunga United Soccer Club
- Nickname: Bulldogs
- Founded: 1963; 63 years ago
- Ground: Wilfred Taylor Reserve
- Chairman: Colin Bolto
- Head Coach: Garth Thompson
- League: SA State League 2 South
- 2025: 6th of 8
- Website: https://noarlungaunited.com.au/
Home colours	Away colours

Noarlunga United is a soccer club from Adelaide, South Australia. In 2019, Noarlunga play in the FFSA South Australian State League. They play at Wilfred Taylor Reserve in Adelaide's southern suburbs.

== History ==
The club was founded under the name of Wakefield Wanderers in 1963 by John Jones and Norm Hughes. The club changed its name in 1974 to Noarlunga United. The nickname the bulldogs is in honour of the club's British heritage.

The club originally played at Wakefield Reserve, Acre Avenue, Pimpala. The pitch was virtually on the top of a cliff. It had a very big slope down hill from south to north and the winds which used to rip down and across the pitch were horrific.

The club moved to the Wilfred Taylor Reserve which is a far cry from the early years. The club has clubrooms and undercover facilities for supporters. Club patrons and players alike have nicknamed their home the pound.

Mike Harkness took over as manager for the 2007 season. The former Cumberland United, West Adelaide Sharks, Sorrento FC, Stenhousemuir, Arbroath and Motherwell goalkeeper brought new ideas and a fresh vision to the club. Under his guidance the club was promoted to the Premier League for season 2008 at the first time of asking. The club came as runners up to Adelaide Comets in a season which could very well have seen them win their fourth championship as they lost it in the final weeks of the season by a single point. 2008 saw a similar struggle but at the other end of the table and the Club was relegated to the State League in the final round of the season.

2009 saw a consolidation of the Club under the guidance of Steve Young (Chairman) and a coaching trio of Noarlunga stalwarts (Lloyd Roberts, David Foy & Colin Bolto). At the end of the season, the Club narrowly missed the Final series.

== Club honours ==
- 2nd Division Champions: 1977; 1980
- 3rd Division Champions: 1968
- State League Minor Premiers: 2010

== Notable former players ==
- (Australia) Michael Barnett
- (England) Cameron Mason

== See also ==
- Noarlunga (disambiguation)
