= West Torrens Birkalla SC =

West Torrens Birkalla
- Full name: West Torrens Birkalla Soccer Club
- Nickname: Birkalla
- Founded: 1979; 47 years ago (as West Torrens Birkalla)
- Ground: Jack Smith Park
- Capacity: 3,000
- Chairman: Amin Ayoubi
- Manager: Stav Gelekis
- League: NPL South Australia
- 2026: 2nd of 12
- Website: wtbirkalla.com.au
Home colours	Away colours

West Torrens Birkalla Soccer Club, nicknamed Birkalla, is a semi-professional soccer club based in Novar Gardens, a south-western suburb of Adelaide in the City of West Torrens. The club was founded in 1979 as a merger between West Torrens (1967) and Birkalla Rovers. The club currently plays in the National Premier Leagues South Australia, promoted from State League 1 South Australia in 2024. The club has played at their current home ground, Jack Smith Park, since their formation.

West Torrens Birkalla has two predecessors: the first, West Torrens, was founded in 1967 and competed in the third division, winning no major honours. The second, Birkalla Rovers, was founded in 1933, winning six first division titles and four Federation Cups. The club has no relation to the club named West Torrens that were founded in 1925 from a merger between Hindmarsh, Cheltenham, and Holdens United, as this club had ceased to exist by the end of the 1950s.

== Honours ==
As Adelaide Galaxy

- State League
  - Premiership (2): 2002, 2005
  - Champions (1): 2005
- Federation Cup
  - Winners (1): 2002

As West Torrens Birkalla

- State League 1
  - Premiership (2): 2021, 2024

== Notable players ==
- (Lebanon) Austin Ayoubi
- (Australia) Brody Burkitt
- (Portugal) Ricardo Da Silva
- (Australia) Joe Gauci
- (Australia) Paul Pezos
- (Australia) Aaron Westervelt
- (Eritrea) Ambesager Yosief
