= 2018 FFSA season =

Football Federation South Australia
- Season: 2018

The 2018 Football Federation South Australia season was the 112th season of soccer in South Australia, and the sixth under the National Premier Leagues format.

== League tables ==
=== 2018 National Premier Leagues SA ===
NPL South Australia
- Season: 2018
- Champions: Campbelltown City
- Premiers: Campbelltown City
- Relegated: Sturt Lions; West Torrens Birkalla
- Matches: 132
- Goals: 425 (3.22 per match)
- Top goalscorer: Christian Esposito (18 goals)
- Biggest home win: Adelaide City 10−0 South Adelaide
- Biggest away win: West Torrens 5−0 MetroStars, South Adelaide 5−0 MetroStars
- Highest scoring: Adelaide City 10−0 South Adelaide

The National Premier League South Australia 2018 season was the sixth edition of the NPL SA as the premier domestic association football competition in South Australia (and second level within Australia overall). 12 teams took part, all playing each other twice for a total of 22 rounds.

==== League table ====
Pos	Team	Pld	W	D	L	GF	GA	GD	Pts	Qualification or relegation
1	Campbelltown City (C)	22	16	3	3	54	24	+30	51	2018 National Premier Leagues Finals
2	North Eastern MetroStars	22	15	1	6	51	27	+24	46	2018 South Australia Finals
3	Adelaide Comets	22	13	5	4	40	26	+14	44	2018 South Australia Finals
4	Adelaide United Youth (Note: Adelaide United Youth cannot qualify for the National Premier Leagues finals series.)	22	10	5	7	42	29	+13	35	2018 South Australia Finals
5	Adelaide City (Note: Following a sanction by the independent Disciplinary Committee, Adelaide City had 18 competition points removed for the 2018 season, and a further 6 points for the 2019 season.)	22	14	4	4	52	19	+33	28	2018 South Australia Finals
6	Adelaide Olympic	22	7	7	8	28	25	+3	28	2018 South Australia Finals
7	West Adelaide	22	8	3	11	30	46	−16	27	
8	Para Hills Knights	22	8	1	13	27	38	−11	25	
9	South Adelaide Panthers	22	6	3	13	29	55	−26	21	
10	Croydon Kings	22	5	4	13	28	39	−11	19	
11	Sturt Lions (R)	22	5	4	13	24	48	−24	19	Relegation to the 2019 SA State League 1
12	West Torrens Birkalla (R)	22	4	2	16	20	49	−29	14	Relegation to the 2019 SA State League 1

Source: sportstg.com
Rules for classification: 1) points; 2) goal difference; 3) number of goals scored.
(C) Champions; (R) Relegated

==== Finals ====
Elimination finals
3	North Eastern MetroStars (a.e.t.)	1
6	Adelaide Olympic	0
4	Adelaide Comets	1
5	Adelaide United Youth	3

Semifinals
1	Adelaide City (a.e.t.)	0
2	Campbelltown City	0
North Eastern MetroStars	1
Adelaide United Youth	0

Preliminary final
Adelaide City	2
North Eastern MetroStars	0

Grand final
Campbelltown City	1
Adelaide City	0

==== Results ====
Home \ Away	ACI	ACM	AOL	AUN	CAM	CRO	NOR	PAR	SOU	STU	WEA	WTB
Adelaide City		2–2	3–1	1–1	0–3	3–2	0–2	0–0	10–0	4–0	4–0	4–1
Adelaide Comets	2–1		1–0	0–1	3–2	2–0	1–1	2–1	2–1	3–1	3–1	3–0
Adelaide Olympic	0–3	1–1		0–0	2–2	2–1	3–0	1–0	1–2	2–2	1–2	0–1
Adelaide United Youth	1–3	2–0	2–2		3–0	0–2	2–1	3–2	3–0	3–3	2–1	1–2
Campbelltown City	1–0	0–0	2–1	1–0		2–1	2–1	2–0	4–1	4–1	5–1	3–0
Croydon Kings	1–1	2–3	0–0	2–1	1–0		1–4	1–4	1–3	2–1	0–1	4–4
North Eastern MetroStars	1–2	3–2	1–0	4–3	0–2	2–1		3–0	2–1	5–3	5–2	2–0
Para Hills Knights	0–1	1–3	0–3	1–5	2–4	1–0	2–1		1–4	4–0	1–2	2–1
South Adelaide Panthers	0–2	2–3	1–1	1–1	4–4	1–4	0–5	0–1		2–0	1–4	3–1
Sturt Lions	0–3	2–0	0–1	2–1	1–5	2–1	0–1	1–3	1–0		1–1	3–1
West Adelaide	1–3	1–3	1–3	1–4	0–3	1–1	0–2	1–0	4–1	0–0		3–2
West Torrens Birkalla	0–2	1–1	0–3	0–3	2–3	1–0	0–5	0–1	0–1	2–0	1–2	

Updated to match(es) played on 2018. Source:
Legend: Blue = home team win; Yellow = draw; Red = away team win.

==== Leading Goalscorers ====
Rank	Player	Club	Goals
1	Christian Esposito	North Eastern MetroStars	18
2	Anthony Costa	Adelaide City	17
3	Andreas Wiens	Adelaide Comets	13
4	Dion Kirk	Campbelltown City	12
5	Luigi Di Troia	Campbelltown City	11
5	Fausto Erba	Adelaide Olympic	11

=== 2018 SA State League 1 ===
SA State League 1
- Season: 2018
- Champions: Adelaide Raiders
- Premiers: Adelaide Blue Eagles
- Promoted: Adelaide Blue Eagles; Adelaide Raiders
- Relegated: Port Adelaide Pirates; The Cove
- Matches: 132
- Goals: 429 (3.25 per match)
- Top goalscorer: Shaun McGreevy (19 goals)
- Biggest home win: Adelaide Blue Eagles 6−0 Port Adelaide Pirates
- Biggest away win: Western Strikers 1−7 Modbury Jets
- Highest scoring: Seaford Rangers 7−4 Western Strikers

The 2018 SA State League 1 was the sixth edition of the NPL State League 1 as the second level domestic association football competition in South Australia (and third level within Australia overall). 12 teams competed, all playing each other twice for a total of 22 rounds.

Pos	Team	Pld	W	D	L	GF	GA	GD	Pts	Qualification or relegation
1	Adelaide Blue Eagles (P)	22	15	3	4	51	17	+34	48	Promotion to the 2019 NPL South Australia
2	Adelaide Raiders (P, C)	22	14	4	4	41	20	+21	46	Promotion to the 2019 NPL South Australia
3	Noarlunga United	22	11	6	5	43	22	+21	39	Qualification to the 2018 SA State League 1 Finals
4	White City	22	10	7	5	37	24	+13	37	Qualification to the 2018 SA State League 1 Finals
5	Modbury Jets	22	10	5	7	49	37	+12	35	Qualification to the 2018 SA State League 1 Finals
6	Cumberland United	22	5	11	6	21	26	−5	26	Qualification to the 2018 SA State League 1 Finals
7	Seaford Rangers	22	7	4	11	33	46	−13	25	
8	Salisbury United	22	6	6	10	36	46	−10	24	
9	Western Strikers	22	6	6	10	42	60	−18	24	
10	Fulham United	22	6	4	12	31	44	−13	22	
11	Port Adelaide Pirates (R)	22	6	4	12	26	44	−18	22	Relegation to the 2019 SA State League 2
12	The Cove (R)	22	4	4	14	19	43	−24	16	Relegation to the 2019 SA State League 2

Source: sportstg.com
Rules for classification: 1) points; 2) goal difference; 3) number of goals scored.
(C) Champions; (P) Promoted; (R) Relegated

==== Finals ====
Elimination finals
3	Adelaide Blue Eagles	0
6	Adelaide Raiders	1
4
5

Semifinals
1	Adelaide Raiders	4
2	Adelaide Blue Eagles	0
Cumberland United	0
Modbury Jets	1

Preliminary final
Adelaide Blue Eagles (a.e.t.)	4
Modbury Jets	1

Grand final
Adelaide Raiders	3
Adelaide Blue Eagles	1

=== 2018 SA State League 2 ===
SA State League 2
- Season: 2018
- Champions: Adelaide Victory
- Premiers: Playford City
- Promoted: Playford City, Adelaide Victory
- Matches: 132
- Goals: 529 (4.01 per match)
- Top goalscorer: George Katsigiannis (27 goals)
- Biggest home win: Eastern 8−0 UniSA, Playford City 8−0 Mount Barker
- Biggest away win: Modbury Vista 0−9 Vipers
- Highest scoring: Victory 8−2 Hawks, Modbury 1−9 Gawler, Mount Barker 1−9 Victory

The 2017 SA State League 2 was the second edition of the new NPL State League 2 as the third level domestic association football competition in South Australia (and fourth level within Australia overall). 12 teams competed, all playing each other twice for a total of 22 rounds.

Pos	Team	Pld	W	D	L	GF	GA	GD	Pts	Qualification or relegation
1	Playford City (P)	22	16	1	5	61	14	+47	49	Promotion to the 2019 SA State League 1
2	Adelaide Hills Hawks	22	16	1	5	52	27	+25	49	Qualification to the 2018 SA State League 2 Finals
3	Adelaide Vipers	22	15	2	5	58	23	+35	47	Qualification to the 2018 SA State League 2 Finals
4	Adelaide Cobras	22	15	2	5	54	26	+28	47	Qualification to the 2018 SA State League 2 Finals
5	Adelaide Victory (P, C)	22	14	2	6	65	34	+31	44	Promotion to the 2019 SA State League 1
6	Northern Demons	22	13	5	4	48	28	+20	44	Qualification to the 2018 SA State League 2 Finals
7	Adelaide University	22	12	1	9	43	28	+15	37	
8	Eastern United	22	9	1	12	39	40	−1	28	
9	Gawler Eagles	22	8	1	13	48	55	−7	25	
10	Modbury Vista	22	2	1	19	18	85	−67	7	
11	Mount Barker United	22	1	2	19	18	92	−74	5	
12	University of South Australia	22	1	1	20	25	77	−52	4	

Source: sportstg.com
Rules for classification: 1) points; 2) goal difference; 3) number of goals scored.
(C) Champions; (P) Promoted

==== Finals ====
Elimination finals
3	Playford City	2
6	Adelaide Hills Hawks	0
4
5

Semifinals
1	Adelaide Hills Hawks	1
2	Playford City	1
Adelaide Vipers	0
Adelaide Victory	2

Preliminary final
Adelaide Hills Hawks	2
Adelaide Victory	4

Grand final
Playford City	0
Adelaide Victory	2

=== 2018 Women's NPL ===
PS4 Women's National Premier League
- Season: 2018
- Champions: Adelaide City
- Premiers: Metro United
- Matches: 84
- Goals: 303 (3.61 per match)
- Top goalscorer: Chrissy Panagaris (27 goals)
- Biggest home win: Adelaide City 6–0 Fulham United
- Biggest away win: Fulham United 0–10 West Adelaide; Fulham United 0–10 Adelaide City
- Highest scoring: See biggest away win

The highest tier domestic football competition in South Australia for women was known for sponsorship reasons as the PS4 Women's National Premier League. This was the third season of the NPL format. The 8 teams played a triple round-robin for a total of 21 games.

Pos	Team	Pld	W	D	L	GF	GA	GD	Pts	Qualification or relegation
1	Metro United	21	17	3	1	72	17	+55	54	2018 Women's NPL Finals
2	Adelaide City (C)	21	17	2	2	77	15	+62	53	2018 Women's NPL Finals
3	West Adelaide	21	11	5	5	48	18	+30	38	2018 Women's NPL Finals
4	FFSA NTC	21	9	4	8	30	33	−3	31	2018 Women's NPL Finals
5	Adelaide University	21	7	4	10	30	39	−9	25	
6	Salisbury Inter	21	5	3	13	18	45	−27	18	
7	Fulham United	21	3	2	16	13	86	−73	11	
8	Cumberland United (R)	21	2	3	16	15	50	−35	9	Relegation to the 2019 State League

Source: sportstg.com
Rules for classification: 1) points; 2) goal difference; 3) number of goals scored.
(C) Champions; (R) Relegated

Semi-finals
1	Metro United	0
2	Adelaide City	1
3	West Adelaide	2
4	FFSA NTC	0

Elimination Final
1	Metro United	4
3	West Adelaide	1

Grand Final; 9 September
2	Adelaide City	1
1	Metro United	0

== Cup competitions ==
=== 2018 Federation Cup ===
South Australian soccer clubs competed in 2018 for the Federation Cup. Clubs entered from the NPL SA, the State League 1, State League 2, South Australian Amateur Soccer League and South Australian Collegiate Soccer League.

This knockout competition was won by Adelaide Comets.

The competition also served as the South Australian Preliminary rounds for the 2018 FFA Cup. In addition to Adelaide Comets, A-League club Adelaide United qualified for the final rounds, entering at the Round of 32.

== Awards ==
The end of year Celebration of Football awards were presented at the Adelaide Convention Centre.

=== National Premier Leagues South Australia ===
Award	Men's	Women's
Player of the Year	Sergio Melta Medal — Allan Welsh (Adelaide Comets)	Shirley Brown Medal — Charlotte Grant (FFSA NTC)
Golden Boot	Christian Esposito (North Eastern MetroStars)	Chrissy Panagaris (Metro United)
Coach of the Year	Martyn Crook Trophy — Joe Mullen (Campbelltown City)	Bob Bush Trophy — Michael Matricciani (FFSA NTC)
Goalkeeper of the Year	Peter Nikolich Trophy — Isaac Richards (Adelaide United)	Evelyn Goldsmith (FFSA NTC)
Rising Star	John Aloisi Rising Star — Louis D'Arrigo (Adelaide United)	Charlotte Grant (FFSA NTC)

Team of the Year

	Men's	Women's
GK	Isaac Richards (Adelaide United)	Evelyn Goldsmith (FFSA NTC)
DEF	Jake Halliday (Campbelltown City); Matthew Halliday (Adelaide City); Iain Fyfe (Campbelltown City); Andrea Dallera (Adelaide Olympic)	Kristy Moore (Metro United); Isabella Scalzi (Metro United); Grace Abbey (Adelaide City); Elena Psaroulis (West Adelaide)
MID	Nicholas Bucco (Adelaide City); Alex Mullen (Campbelltown City); Adam Piscioneri (Campbelltown City)	Charlotte Grant (FFSA NTC); Dylan Holmes (Adelaide City); Maddie Du Rieu (West Adelaide)
FWD	Luigi Di Troia (Campbelltown City); Fausto Erba (Adelaide Olympic); Christian Esposito (MetroStars)	Chrissy Panagaris (Metro United); Daniela Di Bartolo (Adelaide City); Laura Johns (Adelaide University)
