= 1992 SASF season =

South Australian Soccer Federation
- Season: 1992

The 1992 South Australian Soccer Federation season was the 86th season of soccer in South Australia.

== 1992 SASF Division One ==
SASF Division One
- Season: 1992
- Champions: Eastern Districts Azzurri (3rd title)
- Premiers: Eastern Districts Azzurri (1st title)
- Matches: 90
- Goals: 237 (2.63 per match)

The 1992 South Australian Division One season was the 86th season of first division soccer in South Australia.

Eastern Districts Azzurri were champions for the third time, defeating Adelaide Croatia 3–2 in the Grand Final. Eastern Districts Azzurri were also premiers for the first time. Elizabeth City were relegated. Lion-Grange merged with Port Adelaide after the season.

=== League Table ===
Pos	Team	Pld	W	D	L	GF	GA	GD	Pts	Qualification or relegation
1	Eastern Districts Azzurri (C)	18	11	5	2	45	13	+32	27	Qualification for Finals (Note: The winner of the Finals are crowned the champions.)
2	Adelaide Croatia	18	11	3	4	29	22	+7	25	Qualification for Finals
3	West Torrens Birkalla	18	9	5	4	29	19	+10	23	Qualification for Finals
4	Beograd Woodville	18	8	5	5	25	15	+10	21	Qualification for Finals
5	Salisbury United	18	8	3	7	22	25	−3	19	Qualification for Finals
6	Modbury Jets	18	5	7	6	14	18	−4	17	
7	Para Hills	18	4	9	5	13	20	−7	17	
8	Polonia Adelaide	18	6	3	9	26	32	−6	15	
9	Lion-Grange	18	4	4	10	24	29	−5	12	Disbanded at end of season
10	Elizabeth City (R)	18	1	2	15	10	44	−34	4	Relegation to SASF Division Two

Source: socceraust
Rules for classification: 1) points; 2) goal difference; 3) number of goals scored.
(C) Champions; (R) Relegated

=== Finals ===
Qualifying and elimination finals
2	Adelaide Croatia	2
3	West Torrens Birkalla	0
4	Beograd Woodville (p)	0 (4)
5	Salisbury United	0 (3)

Semi-finals
1	Eastern Districts Azzurri	3
2	Adelaide Croatia	1
3	West Torrens Birkalla	1
4	Beograd Woodville	0

Preliminary final
2	Adelaide Croatia	2
3	West Torrens Birkalla	1

Grand final
1	Eastern Districts Azzurri	3
2	Adelaide Croatia	2

== 1992 SASF Division Two ==
SASF Division Two
- Season: 1992
- Champions: Olympians (1st title)
- Premiers: Olympians (1st title)
- Matches: 90
- Goals: 265 (2.94 per match)

The 1992 South Australian Division Two season was the 68th season of second division soccer in South Australia.

Olympians were champions for the first time, defeating Enfield City Falcons 2–1 in the Grand Final. Olympians were also premiers for the first time, and were promoted with Enfield City Falcons. Blackwood disbanded at the end of the season.

=== League Table ===
Pos	Team	Pld	W	D	L	GF	GA	GD	Pts	Promotion or qualification
1	Olympians (C, P)	18	16	1	1	48	14	+34	33	Promotion to SASF Division One and qualification for Finals
2	Campbelltown City	18	10	6	2	29	16	+13	26	Qualification for Finals (Note: The winner of the Finals are crowned the champions and are promoted, unless they have already earned promotion, in which case the runner-up is promoted.)
3	Enfield City Falcons (P)	18	10	4	4	38	22	+16	24	Qualification for Finals
4	Noarlunga United	18	7	3	8	20	30	−10	17	Qualification for Finals
5	Adelaide Omonia	18	5	5	8	17	29	−12	15	Qualification for Finals
6	Port Adelaide	18	4	6	8	29	30	−1	14	
7	Cumberland United	18	5	4	9	23	28	−5	14	
8	Seaford Rangers	18	4	6	8	26	32	−6	14	
9	Blackwood	18	4	4	10	20	32	−12	12	Disbanded at end of season
10	Central Districts APAC	18	3	5	10	15	32	−17	11	

Source: socceraust
Rules for classification: 1) points; 2) goal difference; 3) number of goals scored.
(C) Champions; (P) Promoted

=== Finals ===
Qualifying and elimination finals
2	Campbelltown City
3	Enfield City Falcons
4	Noarlunga United
5	Adelaide Omonia

Semi-finals
1	Olympians	0
3	Enfield City Falcons (a.e.t.)	1
2	Campbelltown City
5	Adelaide Omonia

Preliminary final
1	Olympians
2	Campbelltown City

Grand final
3	Enfield City Falcons	1
1	Olympians	2
