= 2022 FSA Federation Cup =

2022 Australia Cup South Australian preliminary rounds

Tournament details
- Country: Australia
- Dates: 18 March–16 July
- Teams: 51

Final positions
- Champions: Adelaide City (18th title)
- Runners-up: Modbury Jets
- Australia Cup: Adelaide City; Modbury Jets

Tournament statistics
- Matches played: 50
- Top goal scorer(s): Nicholas Bucco; Hamish McCabe (6 goals)

The 2022 Football South Australia Federation Cup, also known as the Australia Cup South Australian preliminary rounds until the semi-finals, was the 109th running of the Federation Cup, the main soccer knockout cup competition in South Australia. The competition also functioned as part of the 2022 Australia Cup preliminary rounds, with the two finalists qualifying for the main knockout competition.

Adelaide City were champions for the 18th time, defeating Modbury Jets 5–0 in the final. Adelaide Olympic were the defending champions, losing 3–4 in the third round to Campbelltown City.

== Schedule ==
Round	Draw date	Match dates	No. of fixtures	Teams	New entries this round
First round	28 February	18–29 March	19	51 → 32	38
Second round	25 March	14–16 April	16	32 → 16	13
Third round	21 April	6–8 May	8	16 → 8	None
Quarter-finals	13 May	24–31 May	4	8 → 4	None
Semi-finals	3 June	21–22 June	2	4 → 2	None
Final	—	16 July	1	2 → 1	None

== Teams ==
Location of teams participating in the Federation Cup

A total of 51 teams participated in the competition, 47 from the Greater Adelaide area, two from the Adelaide Hills region and one from Gawler and Port Pirie. National Premier Leagues South Australia, State League One and State League Two represent levels 2–4 on the unofficial Australian league system and are required to participate in the Federation Cup. The South Australian Regional Leagues represent level 5. The South Australian Amateur Soccer League is not represented on the national league system. Adelaide United Youth are not eligible for the tournament, as the senior team entered the Australia Cup competition at the Round of 32.

National Premier League (2) Adelaide City Adelaide Comets Adelaide Olympic Campbelltown City Croydon FC Cumberland United FK Beograd North Eastern MetroStars South Adelaide Panthers Sturt Lions West Torrens Birkalla	State League One (3) Adelaide Blue Eagles Adelaide Croatia Raiders Adelaide Hills Hawks Adelaide University Adelaide Victory Eastern United Fulham United Modbury Jets Para Hills Knights Playford City Patriots Port Adelaide Pirates West Adelaide	State League Two (4) Adelaide Cobras Gawler Eagles Modbury Vista Mount Barker United Noarlunga United Northern Demons Pontian Eagles Salisbury United Seaford Rangers The Cove Vipers FC Western Strikers	Regional Leagues (5) Collegiate Adelaide University Grads Blue Adelaide University Grads Red Pembroke Old Scholars Rostrevor Old Collegians	Amateur League (–) Adelaide Red Blue Eagles Adelaide Titans Adelaide Thunder BOSA FC Brahma Lodge Elizbeth Downs Elizabeth Grove Ghan United Para Hills West Parafield Gardens Old Ignatians

== Bracket ==
First round Third preliminary round
Adelaide University (a.e.t.)	3
Adelaide Cobras	2
Playford City Patriots	4
Western Strikers	2
Mount Barker United	2
Adelaide Titans	1
Adelaide Croatia Raiders	1
Vipers FC	2
Adelaide Thunder	0
West Adelaide	6
Adelaide Victory	1
Fulham United	0
Adelaide Blue Eagles	4
Northern Demons	2
Modbury Jets	6
Seaford Rangers	0
Pontian Eagles	6
Old Ignatians	4
Pembroke Old Scholars	1
The Cove	6
Eastern United	7
Adelaide Uni Grads Red	0
Elizabeth Downs	4
Brahma Lodge	0
Ghan Kilburn City (a.e.t.)	5
Para Hills West	3
BOSA FC	0
Noarlunga United	5
Modbury Vista	7
Rostrevor Old Collegians	1
Gawler Eagles	8
Elizabeth Grove	1
Para Hills Knights	3 (4)
Salisbury United (p)	3 (5)
Parafield Gardens	7
Adelaide Uni Grads Blue	0
Adelaide Red Blue Eagles	0
Adelaide Hills Hawks	3

Second round Fourth preliminary round
Adelaide University	1
Playford City Patirots	3
Sturt Lions	2
North Eastern MetroStars	3
Port Adelaide Pirates	4
Mount Barker United	2
Vipers FC	2
Cumberland United	1
West Adelaide	3
Adelaide Victory	0
Croydon Kings	3
Adelaide Blue Eagles	1
Tea Tree Gully City	2
Modbury Jets	5
South Adelaide Panthers	2
Pontian Eagles	0
Campbelltown City	3
The Cove	0
Adelaide Comets	1
Adelaide Olympic	3
Eastern United	5
Elizabeth Downs	3
Ghan Kilburn City	0 (2)
Noarlunga United (p)	0 (4)
Adelaide City	6
Modbury Vista	0
West Torrens Birkalla	1
FK Beograd	0
Gawler Eagles	0
Salisbury United (a.e.t.)	2
Parafield Gardens	6
Adelaide Hills Hawks	1

Third round Fifth preliminary round
Playford City Patriots	1
North Eastern MetroStars	0
Port Adelaide Pirates	0
Vipers FC	1
West Adelaide	1
Croydon Kings	0
Modbury Jets	4
South Adelaide Panthers	3
Campbelltown City	4
Adelaide Olympic	3
Eastern United	3
Noarlunga United	1
Adelaide City	5
West Torrens Birkalla	0
Salisbury United	3
Parafield Gardens	2

Quarter-finals; Sixth preliminary round
Playford City Patriots	0
Vipers FC	1
West Adelaide	0
Modbury Jets	2
Campbelltown City	1
Eastern United	2
Adelaide City	4
Salisbury United	1

Semi-finals; Seventh preliminary round
Vipers FC	1
Modbury Jets	4
Eastern United	0
Adelaide City	5

Final
16 July – Gepps Cross
Modbury Jets	0
Adelaide City	5

== First round ==
The first round of the Federation Cup was also the third round of the 2022 Australia Cup preliminary rounds. 2 teams received a bye to the second round: Port Adelaide Pirates (3) and Tea Tree Gully City (-).

All times are in ACDT

18 March	Elizabeth Downs (-)	4–0	Brahma Lodge (-)	Elizabeth Downs
19:30	McGreevy 3', 48', 73', 84'	Report		Stadium: Argana Park; Referee: Daniel Goodwin

18 March	Adelaide Croatia Raiders (3)	1–2	Vipers FC (4)	Gepps Cross
19:30	Gepp 85'	Report	Colangelo 35'; Georgakopoulos 57'	Stadium: Croatian Sports Centre; Referee: Regis Queffelec

18 March	Gawler Eagles (4)	8–1	Elizabeth Grove (-)	Evanston Gardens
19:30	Gela 4', 43'; Sahi 36'; Toskas 45' (pen.); Dahn 56'; Kasumovic 62'; Lesali 76'; Mager 85'	Report	Munezero 15'	Stadium: Karbeethan Reserve; Referee: David Alberton

18 March	Adelaide Victory (3)	1–0	Fulham United (3)	Blair Athol
19:30	Frangakis 44'	Report		Stadium: Rushworth Reserve; Referee: Nick Elagin

18 March	Para Hills Knights (3)	3–3 (a.e.t.) (4–5 p)	Salisbury United (4)	Para Hills West
19:45	Scambiatterra 14', 44'; Shrestha 35'	Report	Maio 24' (pen.); Tylor 66'; McLaughlin 85'	Stadium: The Paddocks; Referee: Daniel Faulkner

19 March	Adelaide Red Blue Eagles (-)	0–3	Adelaide Hills Hawks (3)	Angle Park
12:30		Report	Puccio 18' (o.g.); Quaglia 65' (o.g.); Hosking 82' (pen.)	Stadium: VALO Football Centre; Referee: Foti Massinis

19 March	Adelaide Blue Eagles (3)	4–2	Northern Demons (4)	Marden
13:30	Markham 21'; Canny 28'; Cacciavillani 40'; Ieraci 75'	Report	Balsamo 45+2', 90+2'	Stadium: Marden Sports Complex; Referee: Marnius Haccou

19 March	Playford City Patriots (3)	4–2	Western Strikers (4)	Edinburgh North
14:30	Ajak 23'; Ryan 72' (pen.), 84'; Capone 81'	Report	Carlton 6'; Karakitsios 67'	Stadium: Ramsay Park; Referee: Joe-Jordan Tripoldi

19 March	Eastern United (3)	7–0	Adelaide University Grads Red (5)	Newton
14:30	Matija 7' (pen.); Taufiq 49', 55'; Sunday 57'; Lesi 64'; Carapanayiotis 75', 78'			Stadium: Steve Woodcock Sports Centre; Referee: Mark Michael

19 March	Pembroke Old Scholars (5)	1–6	The Cove (4)	Hallett Cove
15:00	Willats 56'		Williams 31', 39', 63'; King 48', 89'; O'Brien 60' (pen.)	Stadium: The Cove Sports and Community Centre; Referee: Andrew Citti

19 March	Modbury Vista (4)	7–1	Rostrevor Old Collegians (5)	Wynn Vale
15:00	Essex 5', 55', 63'; Bugeja 17', 64'; Librino 37', 38'		Mazzeo 90' (pen.)	Stadium: Newspot Stadium; Referee: Bradley French

19 March	Adelaide Thunder (-)	0–6	West Adelaide (3)	Angle Park
15:00			Da Silva 9'; Moran 15', 70'; Katambis 23'; Amanatidis 38'; Kosovac 62' (o.g.)	Stadium: VALO Football Centre; Referee: Thomas Temby

19 March	Pontian Eagles (4)	6–4	Old Ignatians (-)	Paralowie
15:00	Osborne 15'; Composto 45+2'; Dimas 47'; Garrett 52'; Mina 75'; Nduwimana 90+1'		Uglesic 13'; Titaro 17'; Timpano 36', 49'	Stadium: Yalumba Drive Reserve; Referee: Kim Massinis

19 March	Mount Barker United (4)	2–1	Adelaide Titans (-)	Mount Barker
17:30	Searle 6'; Onyango 24'		Boffa 45+3'	Stadium: Summit Sport and Recreation Park; Referee: Thomas Brinkworth

19 March	BOSA FC (-)	0–5	Noarlunga United (4)	Prospect
19:00			LoBasso 10'; Gardner 68', 88'; Smith 83', 89'	Stadium: Charles Cane Reserve; Referee: Gary Mooney

27 March	Ghan Kilburn City (-)	5–3 (a.e.t.)	Para Hills West (-)	Angle Park
17:00	Abbasi (?); Hussaini (?); Kamara (?); Teymouri (?)		Cromwell 4'; McInerney 19'; Cracknell 76' (pen.)	Stadium: VALO Football Centre; Referee: Garry Powers

29 March	Modbury Jets (3)	6–0	Seaford Rangers (4)	Ridgehaven
19:30	Wegener 8', 71'; Miller 28'; Farrell (?); (?)			Stadium: Smith Partners Stadium; Referee: Daniel Cook

== Second round ==
The second round of the Federation Cup was also the fourth round of the 2022 Australia Cup preliminary rounds, featuring 19 teams from the previous round and the 11 teams from the National Premier Leagues South Australia.

All times are in ACST

14 April	Adelaide City (2)	6–0	Modbury Vista (4)	Oakden
19:30	Bucco 11', 40' (pen.); Kur 19' (pen.); Chikwuba 33', 43'; Gutierrez 62'	Report		Stadium: Adelaide City Park; Referee: Daniel Faulkner

14 April	West Torrens Birkalla (2)	1–0	FK Beograd (2)	Novar Gardens
19:30	Harpas 16'	Report		Stadium: Jack Smith Park; Referee: Andrew Kite

14 April	Sturt Lions (2)	2–3	North Eastern MetroStars (2)	Port Noarlunga South
19:30	Plush 30'; Barbiero 80' (o.g.)	Report	Esposito 43'; Barbiero 45+2'; Cash 90'	Stadium: Karingal Reserve; Referee: Henry Day

14 April	West Adelaide (3)	3–0	Adelaide Victory (3)	Marden
19:30	Yull 7'; Da Silva 11' (pen.), 53' (pen.)	Report		Stadium: Marden Sports Complex; Referee: Joe-Jordan Tripoldi

14 April	Tea Tree Gully City (-)	2–5	Modbury Jets (3)	Surrey Downs
19:30	Anfiteatro 40' (pen.); Allotey 89'	Report	McCabe 5', 7', 54', 82' (pen.); Farrell 9'	Stadium: Tilley Reserve; Referee: Curtis Wordsworth

16 April	Parafield Gardens (-)	6–1	Adelaide Hills Hawks (4)	Parafield Gardens
13:30	McConnell 12', 49', 60'; Coull 17'; Ebert 45+1'; Box 83'	Report	Duffield 80'	Stadium: Bradman Oval; Referee: Bradley Fench

16 April	Croydon FC (2)	3–1	Adelaide Blue Eagles (3)	Novar Gardens
14:00	Kirk 31'; Trimboli 86'; Martinello 88'	Report	Isla Cacciavillani 39'	Stadium: Jack Smith Park; Referee: Henry Day

16 April	Adelaide Comets (2)	1–3	Adelaide Olympic (2)	Plympton
14:30	Stead 3'	Report	Cittadini 14'; Erba 29' (pen.); Konstandopoulos 79'	Stadium: Pro Paint and Panel Oval; Referee: Daniel Goodwin

16 April	Vipers FC (4)	2–1	Cumberland United (2)	St Clair
14:30	Centrone 9'; Wilson 74'	Report	Schoen 81'	Stadium: St Clair Oval; Referee: Mark Michael

16 April	Adelaide University (3)	1–3	Playford City Patriots (3)	North Adelaide
14:30	Stefanopoulos 61'	Report	Nyaruwe 23'; Fyfe 48'; Butler 72' (pen.)	Stadium: University Ovals; Referee: Dion Turner

16 April	Gawler Eagles (4)	0–2 (a.e.t.)	Salisbury United (4)	Evanston Gardens
15:00		Report	Kim 93'; Taylor 105+2' (pen.)	Stadium: Karbeethan Reserve; Referee: Angus McDonald

16 April	Port Adelaide Pirates (3)	4–2	Mount Barker United (4)	Taperoo
15:00	Hamamatsu 10'; Muhoma 68', 90'; Ishimwe 90+4'	Report	Heerah 73'; Twartz 90+2'	Stadium: Ngarrpadla Josie Agius Reserve

16 April	South Adelaide Panthers (2)	2–0	Pontian Eagles (4)	O'Sullivan Beach
15:00	Rideout 77'; Muscroft 87'	Report		Stadium: O'Sullivan Beach Sports Centre; Referee: Gary Mooney

16 April	Campbelltown City (2)	3–0	The Cove (4)	Newton
15:00	Barresi 4'; Mullen 10'; Piscioneri 47'	Report		Stadium: Steve Woodcock Sports Centre; Referee: Foti Massinis

16 April	Eastern United (3)	5–3	Elizabeth Downs (-)	Angle Park
16:00	Fombason 48'; Taufiq 61', 80'; Morrison 65' (o.g.); Matija 90' (pen.)			Stadium: VALO Football Centre; Referee: Eric Ford Sestili

16 April	Ghan Kilburn City (-)	0–0 (a.e.t.) (2–4 p)	Noarlunga United (4)	Angle Park
19:30		Report		Stadium: VALO Football Centre; Referee: David Alberton

== Third round ==
The third round of the Federation Cup was also the fifth round of the 2022 Australia Cup preliminary rounds.

All times are in ACST

6 May	Salisbury United (4)	3–2	Parafield Gardens (-)	Burton
19:00	Taylor 30'; Kim 76', 85'	Report	Coyne 70'; Roadley 90'	Stadium: Steve Jarvis Park; Referee: Daniel Cook

7 May	Adelaide City (2)	5–0	West Torrens Birkalla (2)	Oakden
14:30	D'Angelo 6' (o.g.); Irabona 16'; Devereux 72'; Brown 83'; Dawber 90+3'	Report		Stadium: Adelaide City; Referee: Liam Miller

7 May	Port Adelaide Pirates (3)	0–1	Vipers FC (4)	Taperoo
14:30		Report	Candeloro 90+3'	Stadium: Ngarrpadla Josie Agius Reserve; Referee: Regis Queffelec

7 May	Playford City Patriots (3)	1–0	North Eastern MetroStars (2)	Edinburgh North
14:30	Ryan 90' (pen.)	Report		Stadium: Ramsay Park; Referee: Garry Powers

7 May	Modbury Jets (3)	4–3	South Adelaide Panthers (2)	Ridgehaven
14:30	McCabe 33'; Rayner 52' (o.g.); Wegener 63'; Farrell 68'	Report	Rideout 57'; Ahmad 62'; Muscroft 72'	Stadium: Smith Partners Stadium; Referee: David Alberton

7 May	Campbelltown City (2)	4–3	Adelaide Olympic (2)	Newton
14:30	Matsumoto 22'; Ditroia 38', 62'; Barresi 51'	Report	Cittadini 45+1'; Wilson 45+2'	Stadium: Steve Woodcock Sports Centre; Referee: Daniel Faulkner

7 May	West Adelaide (3)	1–0	Croydon FC (2)	West Beach
17:15	Da Silva 67'	Report		Stadium: West Beach Parks Football Centre; Referee: Gary Mooney

8 May	Eastern United (3)	3–1	Noarlunga United (4)	West Beach
16:00	Lesi 51'; Matija 54', 71' (pen.)	Report	Foglia 14'	Stadium: West Beach Parks Football Centre; Referee: Mark Michael

== Quarter-finals ==
The quarter-finals of the Federation Cup was also the sixth round of the 2022 Australia Cup preliminary rounds.

All times are in ACST

24 May	Playford City Patriots (3)	0–1	Vipers FC (4)	Edinburgh North
19:00		Report	Candeloro 48' (pen.)	Stadium: Ramsay Park; Referee: Eric Ford Sestili

24 May	West Adelaide (3)	0–2	Modbury Jets (3)	Marden
19:30		Report	Francesca 11'; 55'	Stadium: Marden Sports Complex; Referee: Regis Queffelec

31 May	Adelaide City (2)	4–1	Salisbury United (4)	Oakden
19:30	Ochsenham 19'; Kur 77'; Irabona 81'; Bucco 86'	Report	Taylor 54'	Stadium: Adelaide City Park; Referee: Daniel Faulkner

31 May	Campbelltown City (2)	1–2	Eastern United (3)	Newton
19:30	Halliday 27'	Report	Taufiq 62'; Matija 90+7' (pen.)	Stadium: Steve Woodcock Sports Centre; Referee: Henry Day

== Semi-finals ==
The semi-finals of the Federation Cup was also the seventh round of the 2022 Australia Cup preliminary rounds, with the two winners qualifying for the 2022 Australia Cup.

All times are in ACST

21 June	Eastern United (3)	0–5	Adelaide City (2)	Gepps Cross
19:30		Report	Ayom Majok 13', 31'; Irabona 18' (pen.), 28'; Kur 85'	Stadium: ServiceFM Stadium; Referee: Regis Queffelec

22 June	Vipers FC (4)	1–4	Modbury Jets (3)	Gepps Cross
19:30	Candeloro 6'	Report	Wegener 1', 77'; McCabe 8'; Doyle 29'	Stadium: ServiceFM Stadium; Referee: Isabella Blaess

== Final ==
16 July
14:30 ACST

Modbury Jets	0–5	Adelaide City
	Report	Majok 12'; Dawber 43'; Bucco 65', 69', 87'

ServiceFM Stadium, Gepps Cross
Attendance: 3,723
Referee: Daniel Goodwin

== See also ==
- 2022 Football South Australia season
