= 1994 SASF season =

South Australian Soccer Federation
- Season: 1994

The 1994 South Australian Soccer Federation season was the 88th season of soccer in South Australia.

== 1994 SASF Premier League ==
SASF Premier League
- Season: 1994
- Champions: Adelaide Blue Eagles
- Premiers: Port Adelaide Lion
- Matches: 84
- Goals: 290 (3.45 per match)

The 1994 South Australian Premier League season was the 88th season of first division soccer in South Australia.

=== League table ===
Pos	Team	Pld	W	D	L	GF	GA	GD	Pts	Qualification or relegation
1	Port Adelaide Lion	21	12	5	4	41	24	+17	41	Qualification for #Finals
2	Adelaide Blue Eagles (C)	21	11	5	5	51	32	+19	38	Qualification for #Finals
3	Campbelltown City	21	9	7	5	37	31	+6	34	Qualification for #Finals
4	Modbury Jets	21	5	9	7	29	35	−6	24	Qualification for #Finals
5	Adelaide Raiders	21	6	7	8	38	43	−5	25	
6	Croydon Kings	21	4	9	8	37	43	−6	21	
7	Salisbury United	21	6	4	11	29	32	−3	22	
8	West Torrens Birkalla (R)	21	5	6	10	28	50	−22	21	Relegation to SASF State League

Source: socceraust
Rules for classification: 1) points; 2) goal difference; 3) number of goals scored.
(C) Champions; (R) Relegated

=== Finals ===
Semifinals
Port Adelaide Lion	2
Adelaide Blue Eagles	4
Campbelltown City	1
Modbury Jets	0

Preliminary final
1	Port Adelaide Lion	0
3	Campbelltown City	3

Final
2	Adelaide Blue Eagles (p)	3 (7)
3	Campbelltown City	3 (6)

== 1994 SASF State League ==
SASF State League
- Season: 1994
- Champions: White City Woodville
- Premiers: White City Woodville
- Matches: 90
- Goals: 280 (3.11 per match)

The 1994 South Australian State League season was the second level domestic association football competition in South Australia for 1994, and the first under the State League name. It was contested by 10 teams in a 18-round league format, each team playing all of their opponents twice.

=== League table ===
Pos	Team	Pld	W	D	L	GF	GA	GD	Pts	Qualification
1	White City Woodville (C, P)	18	14	2	2	53	12	+41	44	Qualification for Finals
2	Central Districts APAC	18	11	4	3	35	15	+20	37	Qualification for Finals and withdrew at end of season
3	Elizabeth City	18	10	2	6	37	23	+14	32	Qualification for Finals
4	Enfield City Falcons	18	8	5	5	31	21	+10	29	Qualification for Finals
5	Para Hills Knights	18	8	4	6	28	21	+7	28	
6	Cumberland United	18	7	4	7	23	21	+2	25	
7	Olympians	18	6	5	7	27	25	+2	23	
8	Seaford Rangers	18	3	3	12	22	48	−26	12	
9	Noarlunga United	18	3	3	12	10	41	−31	12	
10	Plympton Omonia	18	3	2	13	14	53	−39	11	

Source: SA State League
Rules for classification: 1) points; 2) goal difference; 3) number of goals scored.
(C) Champions; (P) Promoted

=== Finals ===
Qualifying and elimination finals
2	Central Districts APAC
3	Elizabeth City
4	Enfield City Falcons
5	Para Hills Knights

Semi-finals
1	White City Woodville
2	Central Districts APAC
3	Elizabeth City
5	Para Hills Knights

Preliminary final
2	Central Districts APAC
5	Para Hills Knights

Grand final
1	White City Woodville
2	Central Districts APAC
