= 1993 SASF season =

South Australian Soccer Federation
- Season: 1993

The 1993 South Australian Soccer Federation season was the 87th season of soccer in South Australia.

== 1993 SASF Division One ==
SASF Division One
- Season: 1993
- Champions: White City Woodville (3rd title)
- Premiers: Adelaide Blue Eagles (2nd title)
- Matches: 90
- Goals: 247 (2.74 per match)

The 1993 South Australian Division One season was the 87th season of first division soccer in South Australia.

=== League Table ===
Pos	Team	Pld	W	D	L	GF	GA	GD	Pts	Qualification or relegation
1	Adelaide Blue Eagles	18	14	4	0	42	15	+27	32	Qualification for Finals (Note: The winner of the Finals are crowned the champions.)
2	West Torrens Birkalla	18	8	4	6	25	17	+8	20	Qualification for Finals
3	Salisbury United	18	6	6	6	22	29	−7	18	Qualification for Finals
4	White City Woodville (C, R)	18	6	5	7	22	22	0	17	Qualification for Finals and relegation to SASF State League
5	Adelaide Croatia	18	6	4	8	26	25	+1	16	Qualification for Finals
6	Modbury Jets	18	6	4	8	19	23	−4	16	
7	Enfield City Falcons (R)	18	6	4	8	23	29	−6	16	Relegation to SASF State League
8	Olympians	18	5	5	8	25	27	−2	15	
9	Croydon Kings (R)	18	5	5	8	23	31	−8	15	Relegation to SASF State League
10	Para Hills (R)	18	5	5	8	20	29	−9	15	Relegation to SASF State League

Source: socceraust
Rules for classification: 1) points; 2) goal difference; 3) number of goals scored.
(C) Champions; (R) Relegated

=== Finals ===
Qualifying and elimination finals
2	West Torrens Birkalla	2
3	Salisbury United	0
4	White City Woodville	3
5	Adelaide Croatia	1

Semi-finals
1	Adelaide Blue Eagles	1
2	West Torrens Birkalla	3
3	Salisbury United	1
4	White City Woodville	2

Preliminary final
1	Adelaide Blue Eagles	1 (3)
4	White City Woodville (p)	1 (5)

Grand final
2	West Torrens Birkalla	0
4	White City Woodville	2

== 1993 SASF Division Two ==
SASF Division Two
- Season: 1993
- Champions: Central Districts APAC (1st title)
- Premiers: Campbelltown City (1st title)
- Matches: 72
- Goals: 226 (3.14 per match)

The 1993 South Australian Division Two season was the 69th season of second division soccer in South Australia.

In 1993 Port Adelaide SC amalgamated with USC Lion to form Port Adelaide Lion.

Central Districts APAC were champions for the first time, defeating Seaford Rangers 1–0 in the Grand Final. Campbelltown City were premiers for the first time, and were promoted with Port Adelaide Lion.

=== League Table ===
Pos	Team	Pld	W	D	L	GF	GA	GD	Pts	Promotion or qualification
1	Campbelltown City (P)	18	14	2	2	47	16	+31	30	Promotion to SASF Premier League and qualification for Finals
2	Port Adelaide Lion (P)	18	12	2	4	45	17	+28	26	Promotion to SASF Premier League and qualification for Finals
3	Central Districts APAC (C)	18	12	1	5	33	12	+21	25	Qualification for Finals (Note: The winner of the Finals are crowned the champions.)
4	Seaford Rangers	18	9	6	3	31	19	+12	24	Qualification for Finals
5	Elizabeth City	18	7	2	9	24	26	−2	16	Qualification for Finals
6	Cumberland United	18	4	4	10	21	32	−11	12	
7	Noarlunga United	18	2	3	13	15	45	−30	7	
8	Plympton Omonia	18	1	2	15	10	59	−49	4	

Source: socceraust
Rules for classification: 1) points; 2) goal difference; 3) number of goals scored.
(C) Champions; (P) Promoted

=== Finals ===
Qualifying and elimination finals
2	Port Adelaide Lion	2 (9)
3	Central Districts APAC (p)	2 (10)
4	Seaford Rangers	4
5	Elizabeth City	1

Semi-finals
1	Campbelltown City	0
3	Central Districts APAC	2
2	Port Adelaide Lion	1
4	Seaford Rangers	4

Preliminary final
1	Campbelltown City	0
4	Seaford Rangers	1

Grand final
3	Central Districts APAC	1
4	Seaford Rangers	0
