= 1995 SASF season =

South Australian Soccer Federation
- Season: 1995
- Champions: Adelaide Blue Eagles

The 1995 South Australian Soccer Federation season was the 89th season of soccer in South Australia.

== 1995 SASF Premier League ==
SASF Premier League
- Season: 1995
- Champions: Adelaide Blue Eagles
- Premiers: Adelaide Blue Eagles
- Matches: 84
- Goals: 262 (3.12 per match)

The 1995 South Australian Premier League season was the top level domestic association football competition in South Australia for 1995. It was contested by 8 teams in a 21-round league format, each team playing all of their opponents three times.

=== League table ===
Pos	Team	Pld	W	D	L	GF	GA	GD	Pts	Qualification or relegation
1	Adelaide Blue Eagles (C)	21	12	4	5	43	29	+14	40	Qualification for Finals
2	Adelaide Raiders	21	11	4	6	36	26	+10	37	Qualification for Finals
3	Port Adelaide Lion	21	9	7	5	42	35	+7	34	Qualification for Finals
4	Salisbury United	21	8	5	8	28	26	+2	29	Qualification for Finals
5	White City Woodville	21	8	4	9	30	27	+3	28	
6	Campbelltown City	21	6	5	10	26	36	−10	23	
7	Croydon Kings	21	5	7	9	30	37	−7	22	
8	Modbury Jets (R)	21	5	4	12	27	46	−19	19	Relegation to SASF State League

Source: SA Premier League
Rules for classification: 1) points; 2) goal difference; 3) number of goals scored.
(C) Champions; (R) Relegated

=== Finals ===
Semifinals
Adelaide Blue Eagles	3
Adelaide Raiders	0
Port Adelaide Lion	4
Salisbury United	1

Preliminary final
2	Adelaide Raiders	2
3	Port Adelaide Lion	1

Final
1	Adelaide Blue Eagles	3
2	Adelaide Raiders	0

== 1995 SASF State League ==
SASF State League
- Season: 1995
- Champions: Olympians
- Premiers: Para Hills Knights
- Matches: 110
- Goals: 348 (3.16 per match)

The 1995 South Australian State League season was the second level domestic association football competition in South Australia for 1995. It was contested by 11 teams in a 20-round league format, each team playing all of their opponents twice.

=== League table ===
Pos	Team	Pld	W	D	L	GF	GA	GD	Pts	Qualification
1	Para Hills Knights	20	15	2	3	42	21	+21	47	Qualification for Finals
2	West Torrens Birkalla	20	12	5	3	48	25	+23	41	Qualification for Finals
3	Elizabeth City	20	11	5	4	35	25	+10	38	Qualification for Finals
4	Olympians (C, P)	20	10	5	5	39	34	+5	35	Qualification for Finals
5	Cumberland United	20	8	6	6	33	26	+7	30	
6	West Adelaide	20	8	5	7	28	25	+3	29	
7	Plympton Omonia	20	8	4	8	33	31	+2	28	
8	Adelaide City	20	6	4	10	25	30	−5	22	
9	Enfield City Falcons	20	4	4	12	24	43	−19	16	
10	Noarlunga United	20	2	4	14	25	46	−21	10	
11	Seaford Rangers	20	1	6	13	16	42	−26	9	

Source: SA State League
Rules for classification: 1) points; 2) goal difference; 3) number of goals scored.
(C) Champions; (P) Promoted

=== Finals ===
Semifinals
Para Hills Knights	2
West Torrens Birkalla	1
Elizabeth City	0
Olympians	3

Preliminary final
2	West Torrens Birkalla	1
4	Olympians (a.e.t.)	2

Final
1	Para Hills Knights	1
4	Olympians	2
