= 2018 National Premier Leagues Grand Final =

- Event: 2018 National Premier Leagues
Campbelltown City	Lions FC
2	1
- Date: 30 September 2018
- Venue: Steve Woodcock Sports Centre, Adelaide
- Referee: Lachlan Keevers
- Attendance: 1,518
- Weather: 13 °C (55 °F)

The 2018 National Premier Leagues Grand Final was the sixth National Premier Leagues Grand Final, This Australian grand final soccer match was played on the 30 September 2018 at Steve Woodcock Sports Centre in Adelaide, South Australia, between Campbelltown City and Lions FC. Campbelltown won 2–1 to secure their first National Premier Leagues title.

== Route to the final ==
This is how the two teams qualified for the Grand Final.

Quarter-finals
(New South Wales) Sydney Olympic	1
(Western Australia) Perth SC	0
(Australian Capital Territory) Canberra FC	0
(South Australia) Campbelltown City	3
(Tasmania) Devonport City	2
(Victoria (state)) Heidelberg United	3
(Queensland) Lions FC	1
(New South Wales) Edgeworth Eagles	0

Semi-finals
(South Australia) Campbelltown City	2
(New South Wales) Sydney Olympic	1
(Queensland) Lions FC (p)	1 (3)
(Victoria (state)) Heidelberg United	1 (1)

Grand Final
(South Australia) Campbelltown City	2
(Queensland) Lions FC	1

== Match ==
=== Details ===
30 September
17:00 ACST

Campbelltown City (South Australia)	2–1	(Queensland) Lions FC
Ture 5', 32'	Report	Thompson 49'

Steve Woodcock Sports Centre, Adelaide
Attendance: 1,518
Referee: Lachlan Keevers

Campbelltown City	Lions FC

GK	20	(Australia) Nicholas Harpas
RB	2	(Australia) Shaun Harvey
CB	5	(Australia) Matthew Mullen
CB	4	(Australia) Iain Fyfe
LB	23	(Australia) Jake Halliday
CM	8	(Australia) Alex Mullen
CM	10	(Australia) Luigi Ditroia	(substituted off) 61'
CM	14	(Australia) Adam Piscioneri	(yellow card) 90+3'
RW	18	(Japan) Yohei Matsumoto
CF	9	(Australia) Marc Marino	(substituted off) 84'
LW	11	(Australia) Anthony Ture
Substitutes:
GK	99	(Australia) Joseph Ruggiero
DF	3	(Australia) Spase Dilevski
DF	19	(Australia) Thomas Veart	(substituted on) 84'
MF	16	(Australia) Andrew Maio	(substituted on) 61'
MF	7	(Australia) Anthony Piscioneri
Manager: (Australia) Joe Mullen

GK	90	(Australia) Luke Borean
RB	2	(Australia) Andrew Thompson
CB	5	(Australia) Tommy Jarrad
CB	4	(Croatia) Matija Simic	(yellow card) 27'
LB	11	(Scotland) Nathan Shepherd
CM	12	(Australia) Shaun Carlos
CM	15	(Australia) Danny Kim
CM	8	(Australia) Mitchell Hore	(yellow card) 76'
RW	18	(Australia) Chris Maher	(substituted off) 71'
CF	17	(Czech Republic) Marek Madle
LW	9	(Costa Rica) Jean Carlos Solórzano
Substitutes
GK	22	(Australia) Brandon Cuminao
DF	13	(Australia) Rhys Webster
MF	3	(Australia) Tyson Walpole
MF	14	(Australia) Liam Cosgrove
FW	19	(Australia) Carter Glockner	(substituted on) 71', (yellow card) 79'
Manager: (England) Warren Moon

Assistant referees:
(Australia) Aaron Galanti
(Australia) Isabella Blaess
Fourth official:
(Australia) Daniel Elder

Match rules

- 90 minutes.
- 30 minutes of extra time if necessary.
- Penalty shoot-out if scores still level.
- Five named substitutes.
- Maximum of three substitutions.

=== Statistics ===
Overall statistics
	Campbelltown City	Lions FC
Goals scored	2	1
Yellow cards	1	4
Red cards	0	0
