= Daniel Margush =

Australian soccer player (born 1997)

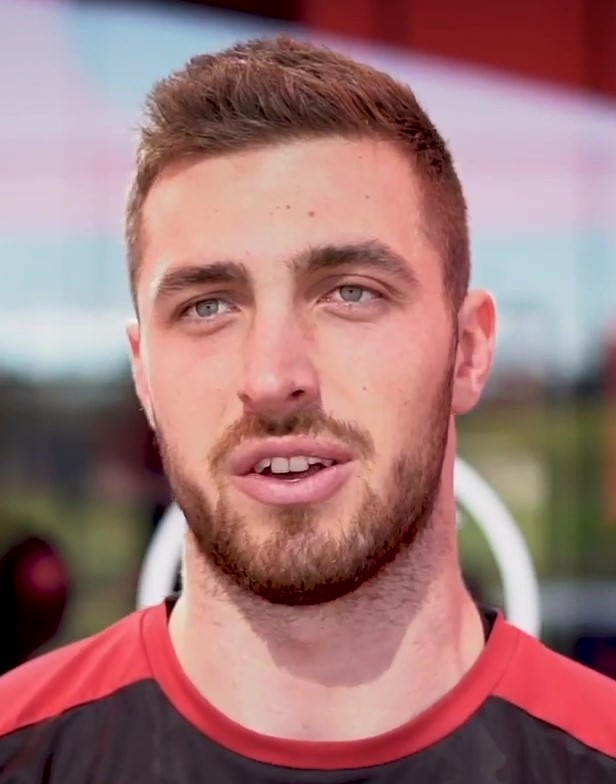

Personal information
- Full name: Daniel Margush
- Date of birth: 28 November 1997 (age 28)
- Place of birth: Adelaide, South Australia, Australia
- Height: 1.87 m (6 ft 2 in)
- Position: Goalkeeper

Team information
- Current team: Croydon FC

Youth career
- Adelaide Raiders
- SA NTC
- 2013–2014: Adelaide United

Senior career*
Years	Team	Apps	(Gls)
2014	Adelaide Raiders	2	(0)
2015–2020	Adelaide United NPL	48	(0)
2016–2020	Adelaide United	7	(0)
2020	Perth Glory	0	(0)
2020–2024	Western Sydney Wanderers	49	(0)
2025–	Croydon FC	27	(0)

International career^{‡}
2016–2017	Australia U20	4	(0)
2019	Australia U23	1	(0)
Medal record
Men's football
Representing Australia
AFC U-23 Asian Cup
Third place	2020 Thailand	U-23 Team
AFF U-19 Youth Championship
First place	2016 Vietnam	U-20 Team
- * Club domestic league appearances and goals as of 30 May 2024 ‡ National team caps and goals as of 14 October 2019

Daniel Margush (born 28 November 1997) is an Australian professional footballer who plays as a goalkeeper for Croydon FC.

== Club career ==
=== Adelaide Raiders ===
Daniel Margush joined Adelaide Raiders in 2014.

=== Adelaide United ===
Margush made his debut for Adelaide United in a win over Central Coast Mariners in January 2016. He was a surprise call-up to the starting side after John Hall was called up to Australia under-23 and Eugene Galekovic was injured in the week leading up to the match. In January 2020, he departed Adelaide United.

=== Perth Glory ===
A week and a half after leaving Adelaide United, Margush joined Perth Glory on a two-year deal. In November 2020, he mutually terminated his contract.

=== Western Sydney Wanderers ===
After leaving Perth Glory, Margush signed a two-year deal at Western Sydney Wanderers. After making over 50 appearances for the club, he was released in May 2024.

=== Croydon FC ===
In February 2025 Margush signed for Croydon FC in the National Premier Leagues South Australia.

== International career ==
Margush was first called up to the Australia under-20 for 2016 AFC U-19 Championship qualification. He was again called up for the 2016 AFF U-19 Youth Championship. He made his debut in Australia's opening match of the competition, a win over Cambodia.

== Career statistics ==
=== Club ===
As of match played 17 February 2024

Appearances and goals by club, season and competition
Club	Season	League			Cup		Asia		Other		Total	
Club	Season	Division	Apps	Goals	Apps	Goals	Apps	Goals	Apps	Goals	Apps	Goals
Adelaide Raiders	2014	NPL SA	2	0	—		—		—		2	0
Adelaide Raiders	Total		2	0	0	0	0	0	0	0	2	0
Adelaide United Youth	2015	State League 1	23	0	—		—		—		23	0
Adelaide United Youth	2016	NPL SA	18	0	—		—		—		18	0
Adelaide United Youth	2017	NPL SA	2	0	—		—		—		2	0
Adelaide United Youth	2018	NPL SA	5	0	—		—		—		5	0
Adelaide United Youth	Total		48	0	0	0	0	0	0	0	48	0
Adelaide United	2015–16	A-League	1	0	0	0	0	0	0	0	1	0
Adelaide United	2016–17	A-League	2	0	0	0	1	0	0	0	3	0
Adelaide United	2017–18	A-League	4	0	0	0	0	0	0	0	4	0
Adelaide United	2018–19	A-League	0	0	0	0	0	0	0	0	0	0
Adelaide United	2019–20	A-League	0	0	0	0	0	0	0	0	0	0
Adelaide United	Total		7	0	0	0	1	0	0	0	8	0
Perth Glory	2019–20	A-League	0	0	0	0	0	0	0	0	0	0
Perth Glory	Total		0	0	0	0	0	0	0	0	0	0
Western Sydney Wanderers	2020–21	A-League	26	0	0	0	0	0	0	0	26	0
Western Sydney Wanderers	2021–22	A-League Men	14	0	2	0	0	0	0	0	16	0
Western Sydney Wanderers	2022–23	A-League Men	0	0	0	0	0	0	0	0	0	0
Western Sydney Wanderers	2023–24	A-League Men	5	0	0	0	0	0	0	0	5	0
Western Sydney Wanderers	Total		45	0	2	0	0	0	0	0	47	0
Career total			102	0	2	0	1	0	0	0	105	0

== Honours ==
=== Club ===
Adelaide United Youth

- South Australian State League 1: 2015

Adelaide United

- A-League Premiership: 2015–16

Croydon FC

- National Premier Leagues South Australia Championship: 2025

=== International ===
Australia

- AFF U-19 Youth Championship: 2016
