= Matthew Mullen =

Australian soccer player

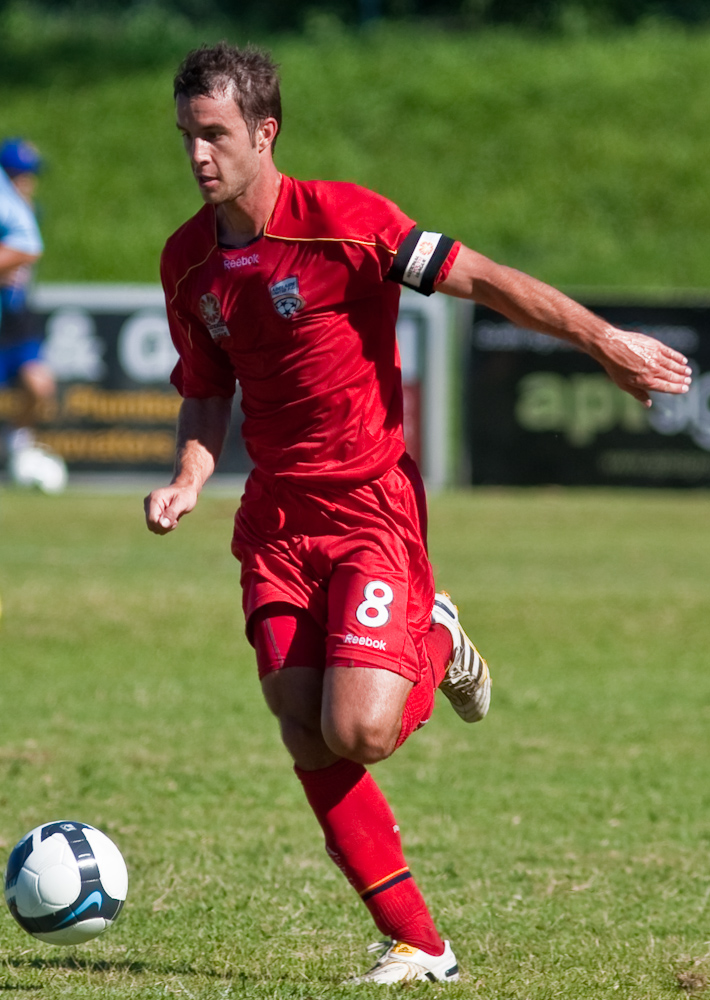
- Mullen with Adelaide United in 2010

Personal information
- Full name: Matthew Peter Mullen
- Date of birth: 24 February 1989 (age 37)
- Place of birth: Adelaide, Australia
- Height: 1.75 m (5 ft 9 in)
- Position: Central midfielder

Team information
- Current team: Modbury Jets

Youth career
- 2006–2007: SASI
- 2007: AIS
- 2008–2011: Adelaide United

Senior career*
Years	Team	Apps	(Gls)
2006	Para Hills	17	(4)
2007–2008	AIS	26	(5)
2007–2011	Adelaide United	3	(0)
2009	→ Para Hills (loan)	15	(0)
2010	→ Para Hills (loan)	13	(3)
2011	→ Adelaide City (loan)	21	(0)
2012–2016	Adelaide City	72	(8)
2016	Adelaide Raiders	13	(2)
2017	Para Hills	22	(0)
2018–2020	Campbelltown City	67	(3)
2021	Adelaide Raiders	20	(1)
2022–	Modbury Jets	67	(5)

International career^{‡}
2007–2008	Australia U-20	6	(2)
- * Club domestic league appearances and goals as of 19 September 2024 ‡ National team caps and goals as of 24 September 2013

Matthew Mullen (born 24 February 1989, in Adelaide) is an Australian footballer who plays for Campbelltown City in the National Premier Leagues. Matthew is the cousin of Daniel Mullen currently plays for Campbelltown City and the nephew of Joe Mullen, a former Socceroo.

== Club career ==
Before joining Adelaide United for the A-League 2007-08 season, Mullen played for the Para Hills Knights in the South Australian Premier League and with the Australian Institute of Sport. He made two substitute appearances over his one-year contract with Adelaide and was signed as a youth player for the A-League 2008-09 season. After some impressive performances in the A-League National Youth League Mullen was awarded a place on the bench against Wellington Phoenix; he replaced Angelo Costanzo in the 67th minute playing his part in the 1–1 draw.

Since 2009 he has been loaned out to local Adelaide clubs Adelaide City and Para Hills Knights during the A-League off season.

== Career statistics ==
(Correct as of 22 December 2008)

Club	Season	League^{1}		Cup		International^{2}		Total	
Club	Season	Apps	Goals	Apps	Goals	Apps	Goals	Apps	Goals
Adelaide United	2007–08	2	0	0	0	0	0	2	0
Adelaide United	2008–09	1	0	0	0	0	0	1	0
Total								3	0

^{1} – includes A-League final series statistics
^{2} – includes FIFA Club World Cup statistics; AFC Champions League statistics are included in season commencing after group stages (i.e. 2008 ACL in 2008–09 A-League season etc.)

== Honours ==
With Australian U-20 football team:

- Weifang Cup (U-18): 2007
