= Christopher Sullivan =

Christopher Sullivan or Chris Sullivan may refer to:

== Entertainment ==
- Chris Sullivan (actor) (born 1980), American actor and musician who appears in The Knick and This Is Us
- Chris "Shockwave" Sullivan, American actor and beatboxer on The Electric Company

== Sportspeople ==
- Chris Sullivan (American football) (born 1973), American football player
- Christopher Sullivan (soccer, born 1965) (born 1965), American soccer player
- Chris Sullivan (soccer, born 1988) (born 1988), Australian footballer for Odysseas Kordelio
- Chris Sullivan (Australian rules footballer) (born 1972), former Australian rules footballer

== Others ==
- Christopher D. Sullivan (1870–1942), U.S. Representative from New York, 1917–1941
- Chris T. Sullivan (born 1948), founder and CEO of Outback Steakhouse
