= Daniel Mullen (disambiguation) =

Daniel Mullen could refer to:

- Daniel Mullen (born 1989), Australian soccer player
- Dan Mullen (born 1972), American football coach
- Danny Mullen (born 1995), Scottish professional footballer
