= Para Hills Knights SC =

Para Hills Knights
- Full name: Para Hills Knights Soccer Club
- Nickname: The Knights
- Short name: Para Hills
- Founded: 24 March 1964; 62 years ago
- Ground: Cass & Co Stadium
- Chairman: Dale Ramsey
- Manager: Joe Allison
- League: NPL South Australia
- 2026: 12th of 12, (relegated); SA State League 1
- Website: parahillsknights.com.au
| Home colours | Away colours | Third colours |

Para Hills Knights Soccer Club is a semi-professional soccer club based in Para Hills West, a northern suburb of Adelaide. The club was founded on 24 March 1964, joining the Federation in 1966. The club currently plays in National Premier Leagues South Australia, winning promotion to the second tier of Australian soccer in 2023. Originally playing at Nelson Road Reserve in Para Hills, the club has been based out of their current home ground, The Paddocks (currently known as Feel Good Physio Co Stadium for sponsorship reasons), since 1986.

The club has won multiple second division titles, finished runners-up in the first division in 1980 and have reached the final of the Federation Cup on four occasions. Their last piece of silverware came in 2012, when they won the FFSA Premier League title, and were promoted to the first season of the National Premier Leagues. They have played in a national competition on one occasion, in the 1981 NSL Cup, losing 0–3 to NSL side West Adelaide Hellas in their only game.

== History ==
Para Hills Knights' original logo, used until 1993

The Para Hills Community Soccer Club was formed by Robert Eldridge, John Eldridge, Chick Harris, John West, Andy Balter and Malcolm Owen on 24 March 1964. The aim of the club being to foster and promote the game of soccer in the Northern Suburbs. The Eldridge brothers were Tottenham Hotspur supporters, so their kit early on was full white. The club set the goal of playing first division soccer within 10 years. In 1965 the club entered a team in the Sunday Industrial League. On 4 April 1965 the club played its first competitive senior game losing 3–1 with Chris Pawley scoring the first goal for the club.

The following year the club entered the South Australian Soccer Federation and once again the first game resulted in a defeat, 2–1 with the first goal in the Federation being scored by Dave Barry. In 1967 the club won its first pieces of silverware, winning the third division, and the Rowely Cup.

In 1976, one year later than the club originally aimed for, Para Hills won promotion to South Australia's first division. Before the start of the 1977 season, the club left its base at Nelson Road to move to new facilities at The Paddocks. The club's first game in the first division was a 4-3 victory against Campbelltown Budapest on the new pitch, the winning goal scored by Harry McDonald. By the third week, the club had achieved its only two wins of the league season, narrowly avoiding relegation.

In Para Hills' fourth year in the top division, they finished runners-up, one point behind Croatia, missing out on top spot after a 1–1 draw with them in the final round. A month later, they won the Coca Cola Challenge Cup after a 3–0 win over Croatia, which was their first major silverware in the club's 17 year history.

Para Hills adopted the Knights moniker for the 1994 season.

== Affiliated clubs ==
=== St Mirren F.C. ===
St Mirren and Para Hills announced a strategic partnership on 8 September 2020. The partnership allows for the exchange of players and coaching staff with a focus on development of young players and coaches. The partnership also allowed the club to recover from financial turmoil caused by the COVID-19 pandemic by attracting sponsorship.

In 2021, 18-year-old Lochlan Czapla joined St Mirren's youth setup after spending his teenage years with Para Hills.

=== Para Hills United SC ===
Para Hills United was founded alongside the Para Hills Community Soccer Club as the Para Hills Junior Soccer Club, and have fielded teams in the Elizabeth & Districts Junior Soccer Association since their formation. The club became an incorporated body on 26 October 1977 and moved to The Paddocks. In 2011, the club was renamed to Para Hills United and fielded a senior side in the South Australian Amateur Soccer League for the first time in their history.

=== Adelaide Brasfoot ===
Adelaide Brasfoot was founded in 2023 by members of Adelaide's Brazilian population with the support of Para Hills' board members. The club fields a senior and reserves side in the South Australian Amateur Soccer League and utilises Para Hills' home ground.

== Players ==
Para Hills' 1966 squad

=== Current squad ===
Note: Flags indicate national team as defined under FIFA eligibility rules; some limited exceptions apply. Players may hold more than one non-FIFA nationality. Squad correct as of 1 March 2024.

| No. | Pos. | Nation | Player |
|---|---|---|---|
| 1 | GK | AUS | Caleb Robinson |
| 2 | FW | AUS | Marcus Grbevski |
| 3 | MF | AUS | Jaxson Merritt |
| 4 | DF | AUS | Mark Ulaj |
| 5 | | | Jack Mitsoulas |
| 6 | DF | AUS | Lionnel Muhitira |
| 7 | DF | AUS | Zack Baxter-Haughey |
| 8 | FW | AUS | Abu Hussein |
| 9 | FW | AUS | Vianne Kurikwimana |
| 10 | MF | BRA | Diego Santos de Oliveira |
| 11 | MF | AFG | Ali Rayez Muradi |
| 12 | MF | AUS | Keshav Shrestha |
| 14 | DF | AUS | Lawand Hussein |

| No. | Pos. | Nation | Player |
|---|---|---|---|
| 15 | FW | AUS | Lansana Smith |
| 16 | MF | AUS | Kairo Felix |
| 17 | FW | AFG | Omid Musawi |
| 18 | MF | AUS | Adam Savetta |
| 19 | FW | AFG | Sayeed Reza Hussaini |
| 20 | DF | AUS | Kyle Marley-McFall |
| 21 | DF | AUS | Habtamu Horne |
| 22 | FW | AUS | Isaac Handley |
| 23 | FW | AUS | Harry Conant |
| 25 | GK | AUS | Declan Burchel |
| 31 | FW | AUS | Alex Tsimopoulos |
| 77 | FW | AUS | Logan Marley-McFall |
| 99 | GK | AUS | Yanni Delengas |

=== Notable former players ===
- (Australia) Joel Allwright
- (Australia) Louis Brain
- (Australia) Lachlan Brook (junior)
- (Australia) Martyn Crook
- (Australia) Yaya Dukuly (junior)
- (Australia) Aaron Goulding
- (Australia) Jordan Elsey
- (Saint Lucia) Sherwin Emmanuel
- (Australia) Craig Goodwin (junior)
- (Australia) Steven Hall (junior)
- (Australia) Michael Marrone
- (Australia) Dylan McGowan (junior)
- (Australia) Ryan McGowan
- (Australia) Jacob Melling
- (Australia) Daniel Mullen
- (Australia) Joe Mullen
- (Netherlands) Bobby Petta
- (Australia) Kristian Rees
- (Nepal) Jagajeet Shrestha
- (Australia) Chris Sullivan
- (Australia) Scott Tunbridge
- (Australia) Charlie Villani
- (Australia) Aaron Westervelt
- (Germany) Thilo Wilke

== Honours ==
=== State ===
- SA Division One Championship

Runner-up (1): 1980

- SA Division One Premiership

Runner-up (1): 2010

- SA Division Two Championship

Winners (4): 1976, 1990, 2006, 2012
Runner-up (7): 1975, 1995, 1998, 2001, 2016, 2022, 2023

- SA Division Two Premiership

Winners (1): 1995
Runner-up (4): 2001, 2004, 2016, 2023

- SA Division Three Championship

Winners (1): 1967

- Federation Cup

Runner-up (4): 1982, 1986, 1989, 2012

- Second Division Cup

Winners (1): 1976

- Third Division Cup

Winners (1): 1967

- Top Four Cup

Winners (1): 1980
Runner-up (1): 1984

- Night Series

Winners (1): 2007

== Seasons ==
Key to league competitions

- NPL: National Premier Leagues South Australia (since 2013)
- SL1: State League 1 South Australia (since 2016)
- Super: Super League (2006–2012)
- Premier: Premier League (first tier: 1994–2005, second tier: 2006–2012)
- State: State League (second tier: 1994–2005, third tier:2006–2012)
- Div 1: Division One (until 1993)
- Div 2: Division Two (until 1993)
- Div 3: Division Three (until 1993)
- SASIL: South Australian Sunday Industrial League

Key to league record

- Pld: Matches played
- W: Matches won
- D: Matches drawn
- L: Matches lost
- GF: Goals scored
- GA: Goals against
- GD: Goal difference
- Pts: Points

Key to cup record

- Em-dash (—): Did not participate/qualify or cup was not contested
- Question mark (?): Result unknown
- W: Winners
- RU: Runners-up
- SF: Semi-finals
- QF: Quarter-finals

Para Hills Knights' league performance from 1996 to 2022. Division One Division Two Division Three

| Season | League | | | | | | | | | | | State Cup | | Divisional Cup | | Pre-season Cup | |
| Season | Division (Tier) | Pld | W | D | L | GF | GA | GD | Pts | Pos | Finals | State Cup | | Divisional Cup | | Pre-season Cup | |
|---|---|---|---|---|---|---|---|---|---|---|---|---|---|---|---|---|---|
| 1965 | SASIL (-) | Record unknown | | | | | | | | | | | | | | | |
| 1966 | Div 3 (3) | 18 | 11 | 2 | 5 | 44 | 28 | +16 | 24 | 4th | —N/a | Federation | R1 | Rowley | ? | — | |
| 1967 | Div 3 (3) | 22 | 19 | 1 | 2 | 80 | 22 | +58 | 39 | 1st | —N/a | Federation | R3 | Rowley | W | — | |
| 1968 | Div 2 (2) | 18 | 8 | 4 | 6 | 32 | 25 | +7 | 20 | 3rd | —N/a | Federation | R3 | Jaxen | SF | — | |
| 1969 | Div 2 (2) | 18 | 8 | 4 | 6 | 20 | 25 | –5 | 20 | 3rd | —N/a | Federation | R3 | Jaxen | ? | — | |
| 1970 | Div 2 (2) | 18 | 8 | 1 | 9 | 32 | 32 | 0 | 17 | 6th | —N/a | Federation | R2 | Jaxen | ? | — | |
| 1971 | Div 2 (2) | 18 | 7 | 5 | 6 | 39 | 30 | +9 | 19 | 4th | —N/a | Federation | ER | John Martins | QF | — | |
| 1972 | Div 2 (2) | 18 | 8 | 2 | 8 | 26 | 26 | 0 | 18 | 6th | —N/a | Federation | R1 | John Martins | ? | — | |
| 1973 | Div 2 (2) | 18 | 4 | 5 | 9 | 26 | 32 | –6 | 13 | 8th | —N/a | Willis | R1 | John Martins | ? | — | |
| 1974 | Div 2 (2) | 18 | 5 | 7 | 6 | 28 | 34 | –6 | 17 | 5th | —N/a | Willis | R2 | John Martins | ? | — | |
| 1975 | Div 2 (2) | 18 | 10 | 4 | 4 | 30 | 18 | +12 | 24 | 2nd | —N/a | Willis | R2 | John Martins | ? | — | |
| 1976 | Div 2 (2) | 18 | 12 | 4 | 2 | 35 | 17 | +18 | 28 | 1st | —N/a | Willis | R2 | John Martins | W | — | |
| 1977 | Div 1 (2) | 18 | 2 | 6 | 10 | 19 | 39 | –20 | 10 | 9th | —N/a | Willis | QF | — | | — | |
| 1978 | Div 1 (2) | 18 | 4 | 7 | 7 | 17 | 23 | –6 | 15 | 8th | —N/a | Federation | QF | — | | — | |
| 1979 | Div 1 (2) | 18 | 5 | 6 | 4 | 27 | 23 | +4 | 16 | 6th | —N/a | Federation | R3 | — | | — | |
| 1980 | Div 1 (2) | 18 | 8 | 7 | 3 | 38 | 21 | +17 | 23 | 2nd | —N/a | Federation | R3 | Coca-Cola | W | Ampol | 8th |
| 1981 | Div 1 (2) | 18 | 7 | 4 | 7 | 28 | 26 | +2 | 18 | 5th | —N/a | Federation | ? | — | | Ampol | 6th |
| 1982 | Div 1 (2) | 18 | 8 | 6 | 4 | 34 | 21 | +10 | 22 | 4th | —N/a | Federation | RU | Coca-Cola | SF | Ampol | 8th |
| 1983 | Div 1 (2) | 18 | 8 | 6 | 4 | 29 | 19 | +10 | 22 | 4th | —N/a | P.G.H. | QF | Coca-Cola | SF | Ampol | 7th |
| 1984 | Div 1 (2) | 22 | 11 | 4 | 7 | 33 | 25 | +8 | 26 | 4th | —N/a | P.G.H. | R2 | Coca-Cola | RU | Ampol | ? |
| 1985 | Div 1 (2) | 22 | 8 | 4 | 10 | 35 | 38 | –3 | 20 | 7th | —N/a | P.G.H. | SF | — | | Ampol | ? |
| 1986 | Div 1 (2) | 22 | 8 | 5 | 9 | 31 | 33 | –2 | 21 | 7th | —N/a | P.G.H. | RU | — | | ? | |
| 1987 | Div 1 (2) | 22 | 9 | 4 | 9 | 32 | 23 | +9 | 22 | 6th | —N/a | P.G.H. | QF | — | | ? | |
| 1988 | Div 1 (2) | 22 | 6 | 8 | 8 | 23 | 30 | –7 | 20 | 8th | —N/a | P.G.H. | QF | — | | ? | |
| 1989 | Div 1 (2) | 22 | 3 | 7 | 12 | 18 | 34 | –16 | 13 | 11th | —N/a | P.G.H. | RU | — | | ? | |
| 1990 | Div 2 (3) | 18 | 11 | 4 | 3 | 28 | 10 | +18 | 26 | 1st | —N/a | P.G.H. | QF | — | | — | |
| 1991 | Div 1 (2) | 22 | 11 | 4 | 7 | 38 | 31 | +7 | 26 | 3rd | —N/a | P.G.H. | QF | Coca-Cola | ? | Ampol (Mar.) | ? |
| 1992 | Div 1 (2) | 18 | 4 | 9 | 5 | 13 | 20 | –7 | 17 | 7th | — | Federation | R2 | — | | ? | |
| 1993 | Div 1 (2) | 18 | 5 | 5 | 8 | 20 | 29 | –9 | 15 | 10th | — | Federation | QF | — | | ? | |
| 1994 | State (3) | 18 | 8 | 4 | 6 | 28 | 21 | +7 | 20 | 5th | PF | Dairy Vale | R2 | — | | — | |
| 1995 | State (3) | 20 | 15 | 2 | 3 | 42 | 21 | +21 | 47 | 1st | RU | Dairy Vale | ? | — | | — | |
| 1996 | State (3) | 22 | 14 | 3 | 5 | 70 | 30 | +40 | 45 | 4th | PF | Mutual Community | ? | — | | — | |
| 1997 | State (3) | 22 | 10 | 3 | 9 | 43 | 48 | –5 | 33 | 6th | — | Mutual Community | QF | — | | — | |
| 1998 | State (3) | 22 | 10 | 3 | 9 | 38 | 37 | +1 | 33 | 6th | RU | Mutual Community | R2 | — | | — | |
| 1999 | Premier (2) | 22 | 4 | 5 | 13 | 26 | 45 | –19 | 17 | 11th | — | West End | R1 | — | | — | |
| 2000 | State (3) | 22 | 11 | 5 | 6 | 49 | 27 | +22 | 38 | 4th | EF | West End | R1 | — | | — | |
| 2001 | State (3) | 22 | 15 | 3 | 4 | 50 | 21 | +29 | 48 | 2nd | RU | West End | R1 | — | | — | |
| 2002 | Premier (2) | 22 | 6 | 6 | 10 | 26 | 53 | –27 | 24 | 9th | — | West End | R1 | — | | Night Series | 16th |
| 2003 | Premier (2) | 22 | 5 | 3 | 14 | 31 | 47 | –16 | 18 | 11th | — | Federation | R1 | — | | — | |
| 2004 | State (3) | 22 | 16 | 0 | 6 | 59 | 26 | +33 | 48 | 2nd | PF | Federation | R1 | — | | — | |
| 2005 | State (2) | 22 | 11 | 4 | 7 | 64 | 39 | +25 | 37 | 4th | EF | Federation | R2 | — | | — | |
| 2006 | Premier (3) | 18 | 14 | 3 | 1 | 56 | 19 | +37 | 45 | 1st | —N/a | Federation | R2 | — | | Errea | 4th |
| 2007 | Super (2) | 18 | 7 | 3 | 8 | 32 | 37 | –5 | 24 | 6th | —N/a | Best Pavers | R3 | — | | Errea | QF |
| 2007 | Super (2) | 18 | 7 | 3 | 8 | 32 | 37 | –5 | 24 | 6th | —N/a | Best Pavers | R3 | — | | Fairmont Homes | W |
| 2008 | Super (2) | 18 | 8 | 4 | 6 | 28 | 25 | +3 | 28 | 4th | EF | Best Pavers | R2 | — | | Best Point | W |
| 2008 | Super (2) | 18 | 8 | 4 | 6 | 28 | 25 | +3 | 28 | 4th | EF | Best Pavers | R2 | — | | Fairmont Homes | 5th |
| 2009 | Super (2) | 18 | 5 | 8 | 5 | 25 | 28 | –3 | 23 | 7th | — | Top Corner | R2 | — | | Fairmont Homes | 4th |
| 2010 | Super (2) | 18 | 9 | 5 | 4 | 28 | 19 | +9 | 32 | 2nd | SF | Federation | QF | — | | Pre-season | RU |
| 2011 | Super (2) | 18 | 3 | 4 | 11 | 12 | 31 | –19 | 13 | 9th | — | Coca-Cola | R1 | — | | Carlsberg | 20th |
| 2012 | Premier (3) | 18 | 10 | 4 | 4 | 33 | 19 | +14 | 34 | 1st | —N/a | Coca-Cola | RU | — | | Carlsberg | 9th |
| 2013 | NPL (2) | 26 | 10 | 5 | 11 | 47 | 45 | +2 | 35 | 9th | — | Coca-Cola | QF | — | | — | |
| 2014 | NPL (2) | 26 | 9 | 2 | 15 | 34 | 55 | –21 | 29 | 9th | — | Coca-Cola | QF | — | | — | |
| 2015 | NPL (2) | 26 | 3 | 5 | 18 | 30 | 56 | –26 | 14 | 14th | — | Federation | QF | — | | — | |
| 2016 | SL1 (3) | 22 | 13 | 4 | 5 | 33 | 27 | +6 | 43 | 2nd | RU | Federation | R1 | — | | — | |
| 2017 | NPL (2) | 22 | 11 | 0 | 11 | 28 | 36 | –8 | 33 | 5th | EF | Federation | QF | — | | — | |
| 2018 | NPL (2) | 22 | 8 | 1 | 13 | 27 | 38 | –11 | 25 | 8th | — | Federation | R1 | — | | — | |
| 2019 | NPL (2) | 22 | 7 | 7 | 8 | 31 | 34 | –3 | 28 | 9th | — | Federation | R3 | — | | — | |
| 2020 | NPL (2) | 22 | 3 | 2 | 17 | 18 | 42 | –24 | 11 | 12th | — | — | | — | | — | |
| 2021 | SL1 (3) | 22 | 9 | 8 | 5 | 21 | 17 | +4 | 35 | 5th | EF | Federation | R2 | — | | — | |
| 2022 | SL1 (3) | 22 | 12 | 4 | 6 | 35 | 28 | +7 | 40 | 4th | RU | Federation | R1 | — | | — | |
| 2023 | SL1 (3) | 22 | 13 | 1 | 8 | 53 | 42 | +11 | 40 | 2nd | RU | Federation | R1 | — | | — | |
| 2024 | NPL (2) | 22 | 6 | 7 | 9 | 33 | 40 | –7 | 25 | 10th | — | Federation | R2 | — | | — | |
| 2025 | NPL (2) | 22 | 6 | 5 | 11 | 37 | 56 | –19 | 23 | 10th | — | Federation | R2 | — | | — | |
