= Thilo Wilke =

German footballer

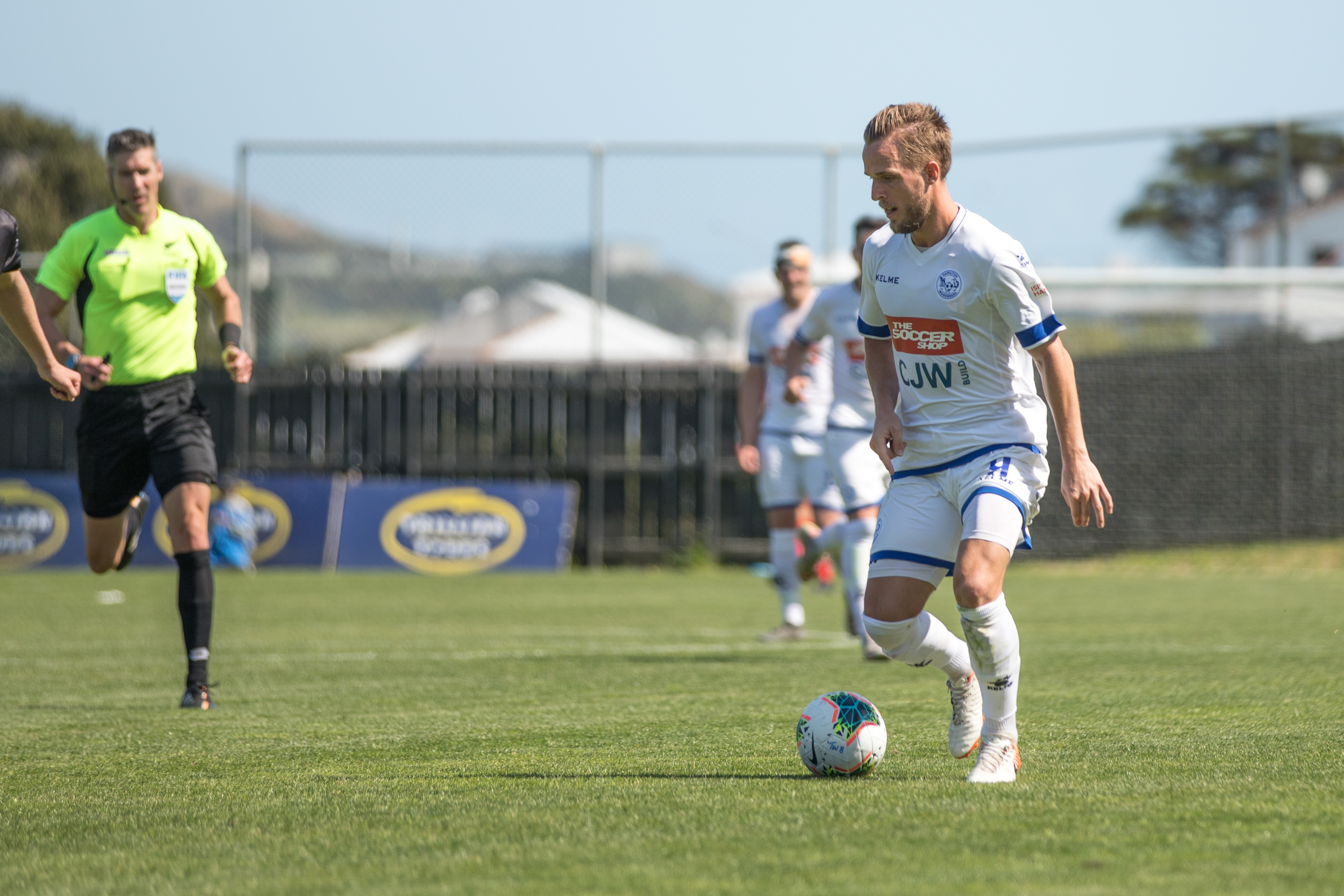
- Wilke in 2018

Personal information
- Date of birth: 20 June 1991 (age 35)
- Height: 1.80 m (5 ft 11 in)
- Position: Midfielder

Youth career
- 1996–2003: FV Karlstadt
- 2003–2005: FC Schweinfurt 05
- 2005–2007: Würzburger FV
- 2007–2010: JFG Kreis Karlstadt

Senior career*
Years	Team	Apps	(Gls)
2010–2011	FV Karlstadt	1	(2)
2011–2013	FT Schweinfurt	58	(21)
2013–2015	TSV Karlburg	60	(12)
2015	TSV Aubstadt	9	(0)
2016–2017	TSV Abtswind	27	(10)
2017	Med City FC	14	(3)
2017–2018	Shaw University Bears	28	(31)
2018	Palm Beach United	12	(2)
2018–2019	Para Hills Knights	14	(5)
2019	Hamilton Wanderers	7	(1)
2020	Para Hills Knights	3	(0)
2020–2021	FC Memmingen	14	(0)
2022	Alta IF	7	(0)
- * Club domestic league appearances and goals as of 09:50, 13 September 2022 (UTC)

Thilo Wilke (born 20 June 1991) is a German footballer who most recently played as a midfielder for Norwegian club Alta IF.

== Career ==
Wilke began playing football at age 5, and in his youth played for 1. FC Schweinfurt 05 and Würzburger FV.

Wilke started his club career playing for FV Karlstadt, and in 2011 transferred to FT Schweinfurt for two seasons. From 2013 to 2015, he played for TSV Karlburg. In 2015, he then signed for TSV Aubstadt in the 5th division. Wilke then signed for TSV Abtswind.

Wilke continued his career abroad in America's college system, joining NCAA Division II NCAA soccer team, Shaw University in the United States. In the 2018 season, Wilke scored 17 goals and 4 assists. His statistics earned a national ranking in the division with 1.21 goals per game. During the 2018 season, Wilke was selected for Men’s Soccer First Team All-Atlantic Region. He was also chosen for the first all-state team by the North Carolina Collegiate Sports Information Association (NCCSIA). During his collegiate career in the United States, Wilke also played for two NPSL teams: Med City FC in the 2017 season, and Palm Beach United in the 2018 season.

In 2019, Wilke signed for semi-professional clubs Adelaide Raiders and later for the Para Hills Knights in the National Premier League in Adelaide, Australia.

On 26 September 2019, Para Hills Knights SC confirmed, that Wilke had been appointed technical director for the club's U15-U17 teams. In October, he signed for Hamilton Wanderers in the ISPS Handa Premiership, which was at this time the 1st tier in New Zealand Football. During his time with the Wanderers, he scored one goal, was part of the round 5 team of the week, and started six out of the seven games until the December break. He then returned to his former club, Para Hills Knights SC, for the 2020 season.

In July 2020, Wilke signed for the German fourth-tier club FC Memmingen. Because Corona pandemic regulations stopped the Regionalliga Bayern season in November 2020, he only played two league games.

== Other ==
In Germany, Wilke has attracted media attention for taking his football career international. In addition to journalist interviews and newspaper articles following Wilke's career, Bayerisches Fernsehen aired a television story about him and the Bayerischer Rundfunk interviewed him twice for a Radio Show.

== Managerial career ==
In 2022, he was named the player-coach for FC Kempten.
