= Daniel Mullen =

Australian soccer player

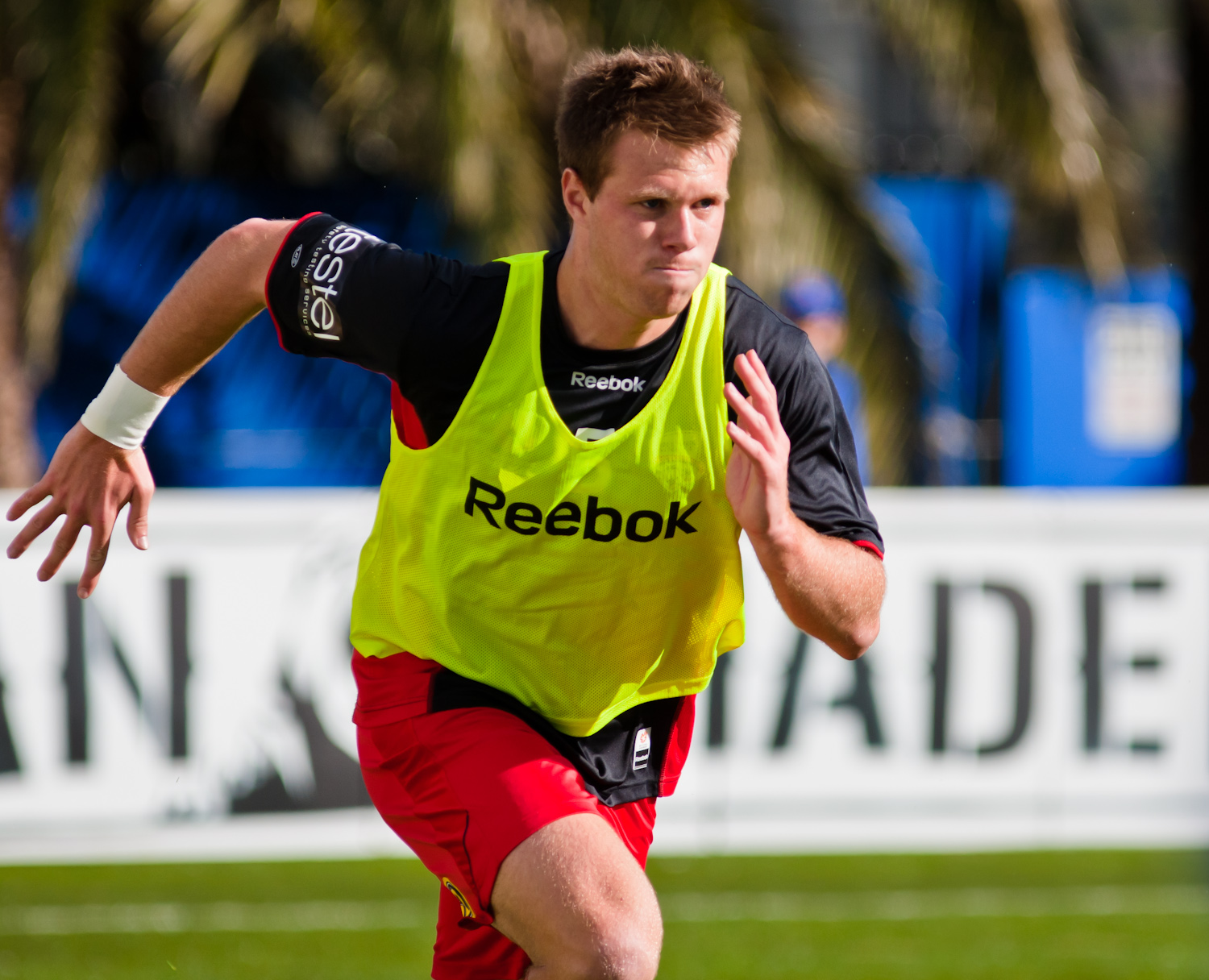
- Mullen warming up for Adelaide United in 2010

Personal information
- Full name: Daniel John Mullen
- Date of birth: 26 October 1989 (age 37)
- Place of birth: Adelaide, South Australia, Australia
- Height: 1.87 m (6 ft 2 in)
- Position: Central defender

Team information
- Current team: Campbelltown City
- Number: 16

Youth career
- 2005–2006: Para Hills Knights
- 2006–2007: SASI
- 2007–2008: AIS

Senior career*
Years	Team	Apps	(Gls)
2006	Para Hills Knights	18	(1)
2007–2008	AIS	31	(2)
2008–2012	Adelaide United	58	(2)
2012–2014	Dalian Aerbin	27	(1)
2013	→ Melbourne Victory (loan)	9	(0)
2014–2015	Western Sydney Wanderers	4	(0)
2015–2017	Newcastle Jets	47	(0)
2017–2018	Wellington Phoenix	18	(1)
2018–	Campbelltown City	136	(6)

International career^{‡}
2007–2009	Australia U-20	15	(1)
2010–2012	Australia U-23	6	(0)
2009	Australia	1	(0)
- * Club domestic league appearances and goals as of 9 September 2024 ‡ National team caps and goals as of 28 October 2010

Daniel John Mullen (born 26 October 1989) is an Australian soccer player who plays for Campbelltown City. He played as a centre back and a right back. Daniel is the cousin of Matthew Mullen and son of Joe Mullen, a former Socceroo.

== Club career ==
=== Adelaide United ===
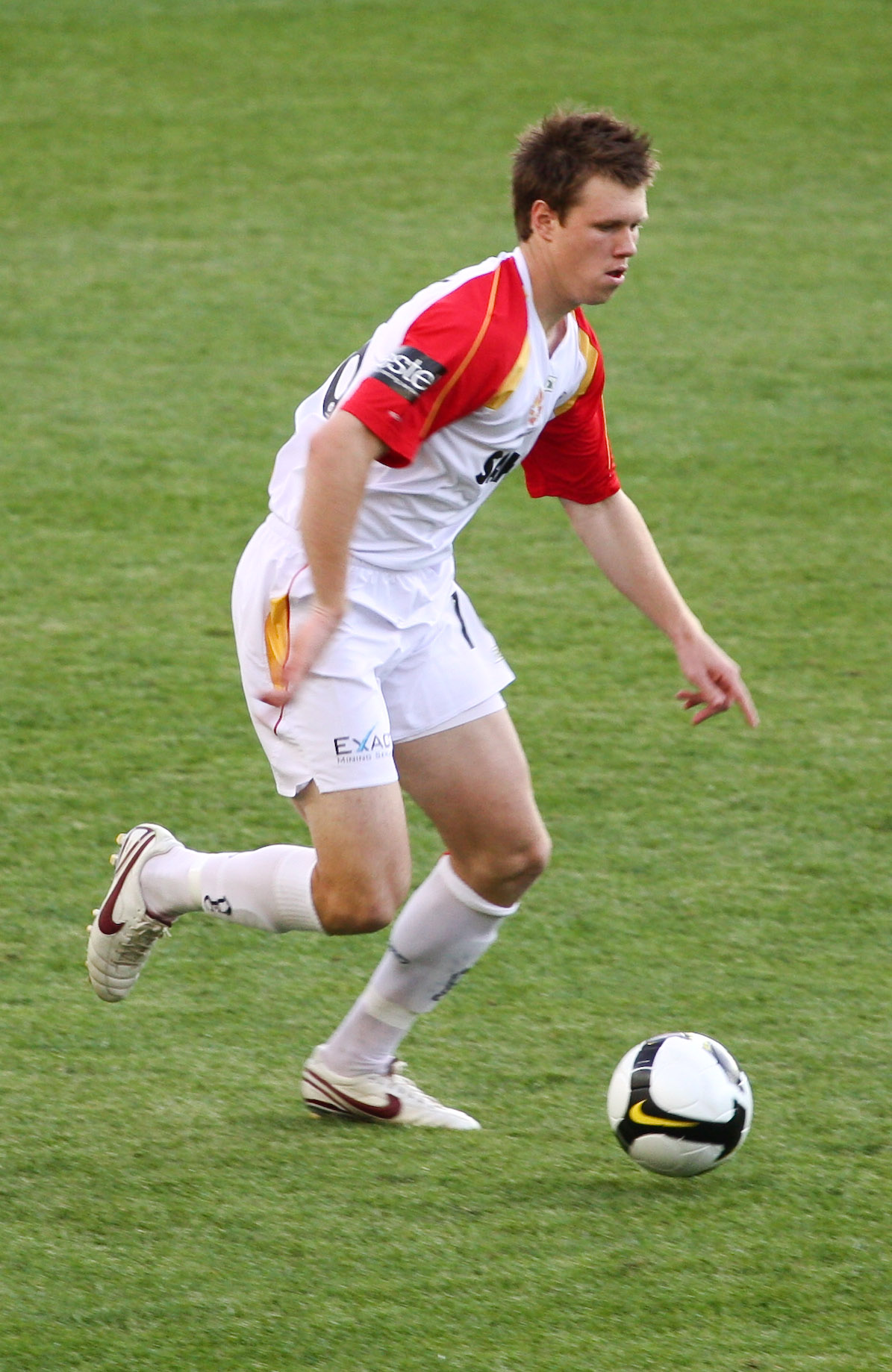
Mullen playing for Adelaide United.

Mullen joined United for the 2008–09 A-League season. On 26 July 2008 he made his debut for Adelaide United in a 0–0 against Newcastle Jets in the Pre-Season Cup. He has since gone on to win a place in the team in the league and also featured against Kashima Antlers in the AFC Champions League. He played in Adelaide's Champions league semi final's 1st leg 3–0 victory over Uzbekistan outfit Bunyodkor and was surely the best game in his short career.

In November 2008 Daniel signed a new two-year deal with Adelaide keeping him at the club until the end of the 2010–11 season. Mullen began to hold down a regular starting spot at right back for Adelaide including starting the inaugural FIFA Club World Cup game for the South Australian team in which he scored the equalising goal against Waitakere United. Mullen scored his first league goal for Adelaide with a powerful header in the 3–2 victory over North Queensland Fury in Townsville in Round 4. He had some trouble holding a spot the first team squad with Robert Cornthwaite and Iain Fyfe regularly used at centre back.

=== Dalian Aerbin ===
In July 2012 Mullen signed a two-year deal with Dalian Aerbin in the Chinese Super League.

=== Melbourne Victory ===
Daniel Mullen Joined Melbourne Victory on loan for the second half of the 2012–13 season.

=== Western Sydney Wanderers ===
On 3 February 2014 he signed, along with Golgol Mebrahtu, with Western Sydney Wanderers. However, since there were no spaces remaining in the club's A-League squad, Mullen was only eligible to participate in Western Sydney Wanderers' 2014 AFC Champions League campaign during the 2013–14 season. On 18 March 2014, following a long-term injury to Golgol Mebrahtu, Mullen was added to Western Sydney Wanderers' A-League squad. Mullen parted ways with the Wanderers on 30 January 2015.

=== Newcastle Jets ===
On 31 January 2015, Mullen joined Newcastle Jets. On 10 May 2017, he was released by Newcastle Jets, along with another seven off-contract players.

=== Wellington Phoenix ===
On 9 August 2017, Mullen joined Wellington Phoenix on a one-year deal.

Campbelltown City SC

In 2018 Daniel re-joined his boyhood club Campbelltown City SC

On 14 August 2024, it was announced he would be taking the Senior Coach role at Campbelltown City SC following the conclusion of the season.

== International career ==
Mullen debuted for the Australian national team in a qualifying match for the 2011 AFC Asian Cup against Kuwait in March 2009.

== Honours ==
Western Sydney Wanderers

- AFC Champions League: 2014
