= Chris Sullivan (soccer, born 1988) =

Australian soccer player

Personal information
- Full name: Christopher Sullivan
- Date of birth: 3 November 1988 (age 38)
- Place of birth: Adelaide, Australia
- Height: 1.90 m (6 ft 3 in)
- Position: Defender

Youth career
- Elizabeth Grove
- St Augustines
- –2007: Para Hills Knights

Senior career*
| Years | Team | Apps | (Gls) |
| 2011–2012 | Apollon Kalamarias | 6 | (0) |
| 2012–2013 | Odysseas Kordelio | 13 | (1) |
| 2014–2015 | Para Hills Knights | 41 | (2) |
| 2016 | White City | 13 | (0) |
| 2017 | Far North Queensland | 15 | (4) |
| 2019 | Marlin Coast Rangers | 12 | (1) |
| 2020–2021 | Stratford Dolphins | 21 | (5) |
| 2021 | Stratford Dolphins 2 | 1 | (0) |
| 2022– | Leichhardt Lions | 15 | (7) |
- * Club domestic league appearances and goals as of 27 September 2022

Chris Sullivan (born 3 November 1988) is an Australian footballer who plays as a defender for Far North Queensland. He also played for Greek side Odysseas Kordelio F.C. and Apollon Kalamarias F.C.
