= Joe Mullen (soccer) =

Australian soccer player

Personal information
- Full name: Joe Mullen
- Date of birth: 5 January 1964 (age 62)
- Place of birth: Adelaide, Australia
- Position: Striker

Senior career*
Years	Team	Apps	(Gls)
1982–1983	Para Hills Knights		
1983–1996	Adelaide City	334	(75)

Managerial career
- 1996–1999: Adelaide City (Assistant)
- 2000–2002: Bulleen Zebras
- 2003: Bulleen Zebras (Youth)
- 2003: Victoria U-16
- 2003–2004: Green Gully
- 2005–2006: Croydon Kings
- 2006–2008: South Australia U-23
- 2008–2011: Adelaide United (Youth)
- 2012–2013: Melbourne Heart (Assistant)
- 2013–2019: Campbelltown City
- * Club domestic league appearances and goals as of 12 September 2007

Joe Mullen (born 5 January 1964 in Adelaide, Australia) is an Australian former football (soccer) player.

As a player, he won three National Soccer League titles.

On 1 May 2008 Mullen was appointed as Adelaide United's inaugural youth team coach.

In 2013, Mullen was appointed the new manager of National Premier Leagues South Australia football club Campbelltown City SC.

In addition to being a manager, Mullen is also a coach instructor, instructing coaches in the AFC C licence for FFSA.

== Honours ==
=== Player ===
With Adelaide City:

- (Australia) NSL Championship: 1986, 1991–1992, 1993–1994
- (Australia) NSL Cup: 1989, 1991–1992

Personal honours:

- FFSA Award of Distinction: 2005

=== Manager ===
With Green Gully:

- VPL Championship: 2003–2004

With Bulleen Zebras:

- Victorian Italia Cup: 2002
- U-14 Victorian Super League: 2003
- U-14 Victorian Super League Cup: 2003
