= Croydon FC (Australia) =

- Full name: Croydon Football Club
- Nicknames: Polonia, Kings
- Founded: 16 June 1950; 76 years ago
- Ground: Regency Park Complex
- Chairman: Simon Gargaro
- Manager: Michael Doyle
- League: NPL South Australia
- 2026: 6th of 12; Finals: Elimination finals
- Website: croydonfc.com.au
Home colours	Away colours

Croydon FC, formerly known as Croydon Kings and Polonia Adelaide, is an Australian semi-professional football club based in the suburb of Regency Park in Adelaide, South Australia. Croydon FC currently competes in the National Premier Leagues South Australia. They play home games at Regency Park in Adelaide's inner northern suburbs. They are one of the most successful sides in South Australian football. The club's ethnic background is Polish Australian and was founded as the Polonia Adelaide Sports Club on 16 June 1950 by Alek Cmielewski and Karol Metanomski.

== History ==
=== Early years ===
The club entered the 3rd division of the SASFA competition in 1952 and won the championship in its first year. They recruited 3 key players from their Polish rival being Izydor Sierocinski, Jerry Demczuk and Stanislaw Czerkawski for the clearance fee of £2.

They remained unbeaten throughout 1952 with the following statistics: 136 goals for, 18 against (aggregate). Stan Czerkawski scored 41 goals that season.

They are the only team in history to have done so. In the same year Polonia became the first 3rd division team to win the Association Cup after beating 1st division sides Juventus and Sturt before beating another 1st division side Beograd 3–1 in the final.

In 1954 while still in the 2nd division Polonia created another piece of history when they beat Juventus 3–1 in the final of the Association Cup to become the only team to have the cup twice while outside the 1st division.

1955 was another great year for Polonia. The club recruited John Kerr from Port Thistle and In its first season in Division One Polonia took out another Premiership, losing only 2 of its 18 matches. Polonia also reached the Cup Final in 1955. John Kerr scored 36 goals and led the club scoring for the next 3 years. Polonia then finished 4th in 1956, runners-up in both 1957 and 1958, and then 4th again in 1959 before a decline commenced.

In 1960–9th, then 7th in 1961 and 6th in 1962. In 1962 Polonia imported four players from Poland-Katolik, Kreft (Edmund left Polonia in the 1970s and assisted Adelaide City in entering the NSL with great success), Gumowski and Szczurzynski. Despite a minor revival in 1963, when the club finished fourth, Polonia was finally relegated to the Second Division in 1964 when it finished last. In many respects relegation in 1964 proved a blessing in disguise. It took the opportunity to completely rebuild its Senior team. In 1965, it won the John Martin Cup and bounced back again into the First Division and won the Jaxen Cup-the Second Division Premiership. In 1966 Polonia welcomed the arrival of Typek, Manka, Nowak and Paprotny from Poland which assisted us in winning the Federation Cup, the Bailetti Cup and the Ampol night series! What a year! The former Division 1 player with Gwardia Warsaw Eugene Nowak at the age of 30 was appointed the player-coach of Polonia. A number of Polonia players including Eugene Novak revelled in playing against Manchester United on 27/6/67 against the likes of Denis Law, Bobby Charlton Nobby Stiles and Brian Kidd. Eugene won the West End Medal and the club added to its trophy cabinet this year with the club winning the Savings Bank Shield in 1967 and the Ampol Cup. Led by Eugene in 1968 Polonia went one further winning the Federation Cup, the Junior Cup, the Savings Bank Shield and the Singlehurst Shield then in 1969 the club slumped to 7th in the League.

The arrival of three more of Polonia's imports namely Zdebel, Cygan and Poloczek saw the club win the First Division Premiership and the Federation Cup. 1975 saw the club take out the Wills Cup and become the South Australian Champions. In the Inaugural year of the National Soccer League, Polonia took out 3 major honours-the First Division Title, the Coca-Cola Cup and the Ampol Cup. Much of the credit for the 1977 triumph go to the Player-Coach Jan Mszyca who was recruited from Poland's top side-L.K.S. Lodz towards the end of 1976. Jan's presence was felt when Polonia then took out the Ampol Cup again in 1978.

=== 1980s ===
In 1981 Polonia was runner up in the league and also reached the Federation Cup Final. In February 1982 Jan Kierno arrived from Poland and the senior team was runner up in the league, the reserve and junior teams won their respective Premierships. In 1983 Adam Karpinski arrived from Poland and the senior team finished third, Reserves fourth and the Juniors again won their Premiership. The Senior team however did win the Coca-Cola Cup and Jan Kierno won the Rothmans medal. After sliding down the table in 1984, Polonia contracted a Professional Coach from Poland, W Obrebski, who would solve the coaching problem which had existed at the club over the last few years. Then suddenly a few months later in January 1985, to the shock of everybody in the league, Obrebski was killed in a car accident. Despite the heavy blow and in his honour, the senior team finished fourth but won the Coca-Cola Cup. The Reserves team however did win the Bailetti Cup. In 1987 the senior team finished sixth and the Reserves team finished second. 1986 saw the senior team finish eighth, reserves fifth and the Juniors fourth. David Doorne Captain of the senior team did however did win the Rothmans Medal. In 1988 the club contracted Professional Coach Z Gutowski and three further players from Poland-M Niewiadomski, P Wieczorek and E Lonka. The senior team finished seventh, the Reserves fourth and the Juniors fifth. M Niewiadomski finished the season as the League's Top Scorer and won $1000 and the Bianco Award for his season tally of 16 goals.

Polonia Reserve. Home ground from late 1950s until 2019.

=== Modern era ===
1993 saw the implementation of the U23 team replacing the Reserves and the removal of ethnic names from the league. Hence the teams were known as Croydon Kings. The senior team finished 9th in the new competition.

After playing Enfield City for the Minor Premiership in 2002 with the new name of the Croydon Kings, the team spurred on and watched with over 2000 spectators won not only an epic encounter to re-enter the Premier league in its first attempt, but also the State League Championship. Croydon Kings then reformed both on and off the field. Its logo became the famous Sirena but this time with a soccer ball replacing the traditional shield. Mickey Doyle led the club in 2004 but resigned for personal reasons mid season. The club Chairman Greg Sierocinski, then recruited former Adelaide City player and former Socceroo Joe Mullen, who just finished coaching Green Gully in the Victorian Super League.

In 2007 and led by Paul Schillabeer, Polonia won the Best Premier League and secured promotion to the Best Super League (Division). In 2008 they finished bottom in their first season and were demoted back to the Premier League (2nd Division).

In 2010 Polonia won the Premier League Grand final Play-off series defeating Modbury Jets 2–1 in the final at Hindmarsh Stadium to secure promotion to the Super League. The following year the club finished 8th and avoided relegation back to the Premier League after managing a number of draws towards the end of the season, most notably a 1–1 draw against Adelaide City in the last round of the season denying them the Minor Premiership. On 1 September 2011, it was announced that the new senior team coach for the 2012 season would be club legend John Kosmina. However, on 18 December 2011, before having even been in charge of one senior game, he left the club to coach A-League club Adelaide United, he was replaced by Mark Brazzale.

On 11 August 2012 the club won the FFSA Super League premiership finishing top of the table after defeating Adelaide Comets 1–0 at Polonia Reserve. The only goal of the game coming in the second half through number 15, Luke Air.

On 13 September 2014 the club was crowned champions of the 2014 National Premier Leagues South Australia by defeating North Eastern MetroStars SC 2–1.

The clubs recent success continued when they lifted the 2015 FFSA Federation Cup trophy after defeating Adelaide City 2–0 in the final with both goals scored by striker Andreas Wiens. The cup win also secured the clubs berth into the 2015 FFA Cup however the club was defeated in the round of 32 by Brisbane based side Queensland Lions FC.

At the conclusion 2017 FFSA season, and after placing 4th on the league table Croydon qualified to take part in the 2017 finals series. After defeating West Adelaide, Adelaide Comets and MetroStars the side came up against minor premiership winners Adelaide City in a game played on 9 September 2017 at Hindmarsh Stadium. Courtesy of two-second half goals from strikers Paul Radice and Shaun McGreevy the club claimed its second NPL SA championship title with a 2–1 win. 17-year-old Croydon player Hosine Bility was named man of the match.

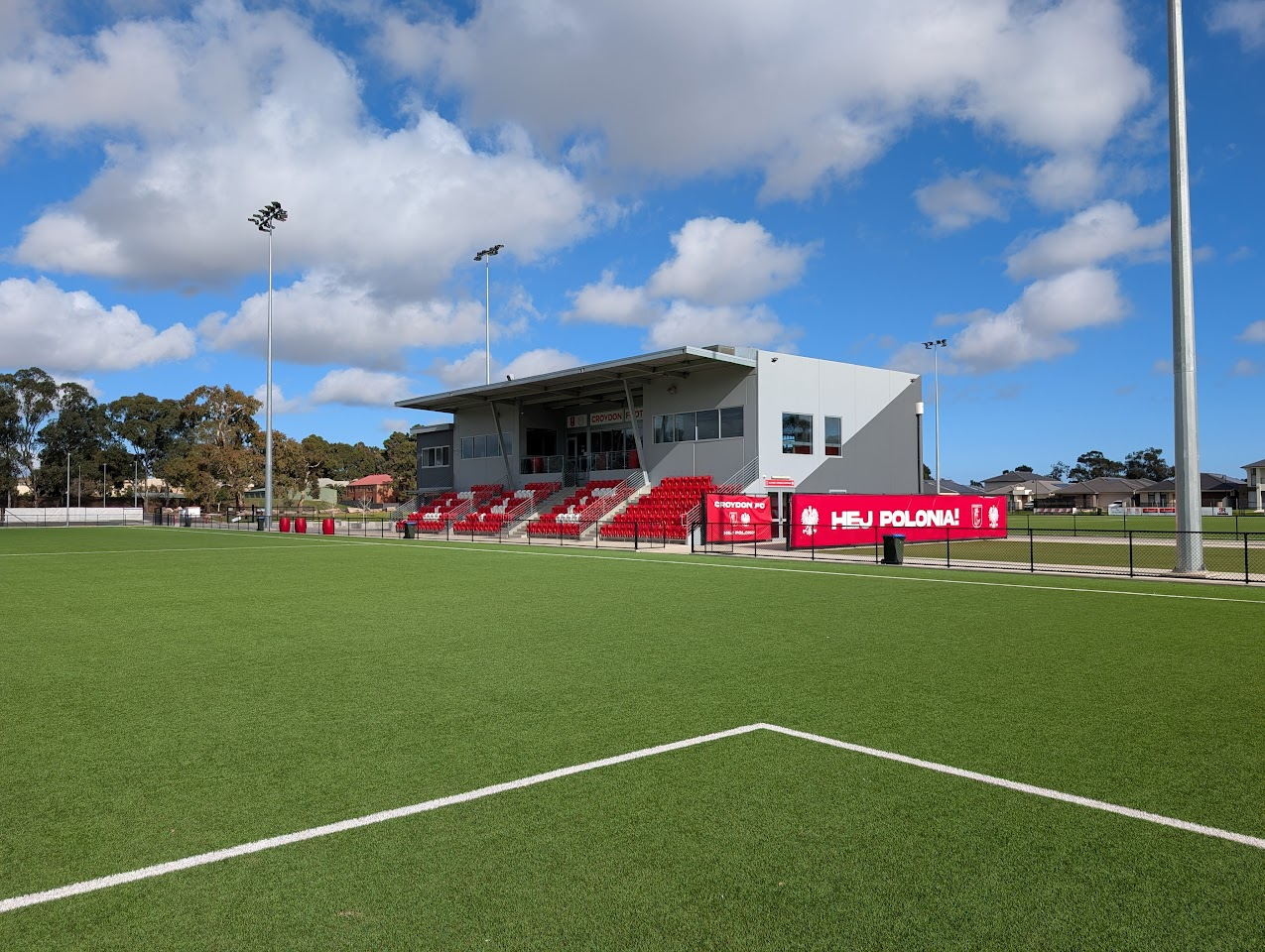
Regency Park Complex. Current home ground since 2022.

The end of 2022 saw Croydon FC relocate to their new home down the road from Polonia Reserve to the newly built Regency Park Complex.

After signing Manager George Tsonis for the 2025 season, Croydon FC started slowly, picking up only one win in the first four. However, the mid point of the season saw them go on a run of nine straight undefeated, picking up seven wins, to see them finish third at season's end. Seeing off West Torrens Birkalla and Adelaide City in the finals, saw them face MetroStars in what would be a repeat of the 2014 Grand Final. Meiya Hisamoto opened the scoring for Croydon FC early in the second half, MetroStars found an equaliser in stoppage time, but from the kick off Pasia John whipped in a cross that found Andre Carle who looped a header into the back of the net to make it 2-1 and crown Croydon FC 2025 NPL South Australia Champions.

== Honours ==
=== State ===
- South Australian First Division Championship

Winners (6): 1955, 1975, 1977, 2014, 2017, 2025
Runner-up (7): 1957, 1958, 1968, 1970, 1981, 1982, 1998

- South Australian First Division Premiership

Winners (1): 2012

- South Australian Second Division Championship

Winners (4): 1965, 2002, 2007, 2010
Runner-up (2): 1954, 1997

- South Australian Second Division Premiership

Runner-up (1): 2010

- South Australian Third Division Championship

Winners (1): 1952

- Federation Cup

Winners (6): 1952, 1966, 1968, 1975, 2000, 2015
Runner-up (9): 1954, 1955, 1958, 1964, 1981, 1988, 1996, 2002, 2018

- Second Division Cup

Runner-up (1): 1954

- Third Division Cup

Winners (1): 1952

- Top Four Cup

Winners (4): 1977, 1978, 1983, 1985
Runner-up (2): 1974, 1975

- Night Series

Winners (4): 1966, 1973, 1977, 1978
Runner-up (3): 1954, 1967, 1976

- Premier Cup

Runner-up (1): 1987

== Current squad ==
As of 17 February 2026

Note: Flags indicate national team as defined under FIFA eligibility rules; some limited exceptions apply. Players may hold more than one non-FIFA nationality.

No.	Pos.	Nation	Player
1	GK	AUS	Daniel Margush
2	DF	AUS	Cam O'Doherty
3	DF	AUS	Jesse Martire
4	DF	AUS	Thomas Mastrantuone
5	MF	AUS	Lukasz Klimek (Captain)
6	DF	AUS	Chris Vivian
7	MF	AUS	Pasia John
8	MF	AUS	Adam Martinello (Vice-Captain)
9	FW	AUS	Santana Bartkowski
10	MF	ARG	Tomas Greco
11	MF	AUS	Oscar Slattery
12	MF	AUS	Luca Trimboli

No.	Pos.	Nation	Player
13	DF	AUS	Christian Brazzale
14	MF	AUS	Ned Styles
15	DF	AUS	James Polli
16	FW	AUS	Angas Baker
17	MF	JPN	Yuya Kato
18	FW	AUS	Oliver Trimboli
19	MF	AUS	Eli Bojcevski
20	MF	AUS	Alex Goode
21	GK	AUS	Matthew Woithe
22	DF	AUS	Bol Mapor
23	DF	AUS	Freddie Muller
