= State League South Australia =

- Organising body: Football South Australia
- First season: 2013; 13 years ago
- Country: Australia
- State: South Australia
- Confederation: AFC
- Number of clubs: 46: SL1: 12; SL2: 24
- Level on pyramid: 4 and 5 (notionally)
- Promotion to: National Premier Leagues SA
- Domestic cup(s): National; Australia Cup; State; Federation Cup
- Current champions: SL1: Adelaide Raiders (2026); SL2: Pontian Eagles (2026)
- Current premiers: SL1: Adelaide Raiders (2026); SL2N: Pontian Eagles (2026); SL2S: Vipers FC (2026)
- Most championships: State League 1: Adelaide Croatia Raiders; (3 titles); State League 2: Eastern United; (2 titles)
- Broadcaster: YouTube (SL1 only)
- Website: footballsa.com.au

State League South Australia is a series of semi-professional and amateur soccer leagues in the Australian state of South Australia. It consists of State League 1 South Australia (SL1) and State League 2 South Australia (SL2), which comprise the second and third tiers of soccer in South Australia and the third and fourth tiers of soccer in Australia. The league was founded in 2012 as a successor to the FFSA Premier and State Leagues and is managed by Football South Australia.

State League 1 is a single division of 12 teams who play home and away in the regular season. The team that finishes top of the ladder are crowned premiers and win promotion to the National Premier Leagues South Australia (NPL SA), with the top six teams qualifying for a finals series, culminating in early September with a Grand Final. The winners of the Grand Final are crowned champions and are promoted to the NPL SA, unless they have already won promotion as premiers, in which case the other Grand Finalist is awarded promotion.

State League 2 consists of a North (SL2N) and South (SL2S) division, each consisting of twelve teams who play each other twice over the course of the regular season, with the top four teams of each conference qualifying for the promotion playoffs. The two premiers play each other in a championship match, with the winner gaining promotion to State League 1, and the loser joining the bracket with the other six teams, who play for the second promotion spot.

== Change of format ==
The State League 1 was reduced from a 16 team competition to a 12 team competition from the 2016 season, as part of a restructuring of the league format, moving from a 2 tiered system to a 3 tiered system with the introduction of a new 3rd division called State League 2.

State League 2 was split into north and south conferences ahead of the 2025 season.

== Current members ==
=== State League 1 ===
Club	Location	Home Ground
Adelaide Atletico	Blair Athol	Rushworth Reserve
Adelaide Blue Eagles	Marden	Marden Sports Complex
Adelaide Cobras FC	Plympton	Weigall Oval
Adelaide Comets	Mile End	Ellis Park
Adelaide Olympic	Angle Park	Apex Football Centre
Cumberland United	Clarence Gardens	AA Bailey Reserve
Eastern United	Athelstone	Athelstone Recreation Reserve
Fulham United	West Beach	West Beach Parks Football Centre
Modbury Vista	Wynn Vale	Newspot Stadium
Para Hills Knights	Para Hills West	The Paddocks
Pontian Eagles	Paralowie	Yalumba Reserve
The Cove FC	Trott Park	Southern Soccer Facility

=== State League 2 ===
Conference	Club	Location	Home ground
North	Angle Vale	Angle Vale	Angle Vale Community Sports Centre
North	Barossa United	Nuriootpa	Hoffman Oval
North	Elizabeth Downs	Elizabeth Downs	Argana Park
North	Elizabeth Grove	Elizabeth	Dauntsey Reserve
North	Gawler Eagles	Evanston Gardens	Karbeethan Reserve
North	Northern Demons	Port Pirie	Byrne Park
North	Salisbury Inter	Salisbury North	Underdown Park
North	Salisbury United	Burton	Burton Park Football Centre
North	Para Hills East	Para Hills	Para Hills Oval
North	Para Hills West	Salisbury East	Manor Farm Oval
North	Port Adelaide	Taperoo	Ngarrpadla Josie Agius Reserve
North	Tea Tree Gully	Surrey Downs	Tilley Reserve
South	Adelaide Hills Hawks	Woodside	Hawks Nest
South	Adelaide Titans	Findon	Matheson Reserve
South	Adelaide University	North Adelaide	University Ovals
South	Ghan Kilburn City	Ferryden Park	Ferryden Park Reserve
South	Mount Barker United	Mount Barker	Summit Sport and Recreation Park
South	Noarlunga United	Morphett Vale	Wilfred Taylor Reserve
South	Plympton Bulldogs	Plympton Park	Plympton Oval
South	Seaford Rangers	Port Noarlunga South	Karingal Reserve
South	South Adelaide	O'Sullivan Beach	O'Sullivan Beach Sports and Community Centre
South	Sturt Marion Thunder	Marion	Marion Oval
South	Vipers FC	St Clair	Evian Football Park
South	Western Strikers	Royal Park	Carnegie Reserve

Promotion Play-off
N1
S1
Elimination Finals
N3
S3
S4
N2
N4
S2

Preliminary Finals

Promotion Play-off

The State League 2 playoff bracket, as used since its split into conferences in 2025.

== Honours ==
=== 2006–2012 ===
The league was founded in 2006 with one division.

Season	Champions	Premiers
2006	—	Adelaide Cobras
2007	—	Adelaide Comets
2008	West Adelaide	Salisbury United
2009	Enfield City	Enfield City
2010	Playford City	Noarlunga United
2011	South Adelaide	Salisbury United
2012	West Adelaide	West Adelaide

From 2013 to 2015, the State League was part of the National Premier Leagues South Australia system.

=== 2016–2024 ===
In 2016, a second division was introduced.

Champions
Season	Division 1	Division 2
2016	Cumberland United	Noarlunga United
2017	Sturt Lions	Seaford Rangers
2018	Adelaide Raiders	Adelaide Victory
2019	Cumberland United	Adelaide Hills
2020	Sturt Lions	Eastern United
2021	White City	Adelaide University
2022	West Adelaide	Vipers
2023	Adelaide Croatia Raiders	Salisbury United
2024	Playford City	The Cove

Premiers
Season	Division 1	Division 2
2016	Cumberland United	Noarlunga United
2017	South Adelaide	Seaford Rangers
2018	Adelaide Blue Eagles	Playford City
2019	Modbury Jets	Adelaide Hills
2020	South Adelaide	Adelaide Cobras
2021	West Torrens Birkalla	Port Adelaide
2022	Modbury Jets	Adelaide Cobras
2023	Adelaide Croatia Raiders	Salisbury United
2024	West Torrens Birkalla	Pontian Eagles

== See also ==
- Soccer in South Australia
