= Adelaide Olympic FC =

Football club in South Australia

Adelaide Olympic
- Full name: Adelaide Olympic Football Club
- Nicknames: Olympic, AOFC
- Founded: 1978; 48 years ago
- Ground: APEX Football Stadium
- Capacity: 3,000
- President: Archie Christakos
- Coach: Andrew Calderbank
- League: SA State League 1
- 2026: 3rd of 12
Home colours	Away colours

Adelaide Olympic F.C. is a football club from Adelaide, South Australia. The club competes in the National Premier Leagues South Australia.

== Origins ==
The club's origins can first be traced back to 1978, where it was founded under the name of Adelaide Asteras. In 1982, the club changed its name to Thebarton Asteras. Six years later, the club was taken over by the Greek Orthodox Community of South Australia Incorporated, who changed its name to Olympians in 1989. In 1998, the Greek Orthodox Community of South Australia Incorporated relinquished the Olympians soccer Club, which amalgamated with SAASL Club "Adelaide Rodos Soccer Club", while keeping the playing name of Olympians. In 1999, the Olympians amalgamated with the Regency Lions Sports and Social Club (Adelaide Hellenic Soccer Club). In 2000, the name was changed to Olympic Football Club. In 2001, the club adopted its current name of Adelaide Olympic.

== Club history ==
=== The early years ===
The club played its first games as Adelaide Asteras in 1979 in the sixth division of the Amateur league. Its initial home games were played at Woodville West, and the club won the division amassing 104 goals – including a 15–0 victory over West End United. In 1981, the club joined the SASF Metro League and won the league in its first season. They were promoted to the 2nd division, finished last and relegated back to the Metro League in 1982. In 1983, the club finished second and was promoted back up to the second division. The club struggled in the second division for the next eight years.

In 1992, the Olympians dominated the second division finishing seven points clear at the top of the table and were promoted to the 1st division. In the same year the club won the top four play-off finals. The topsy turvy path continued over the coming years, which included the club being relegated back to the second division in 1994 (failing to meet new FFSA requirements), returning to the Premier League in 1996, dropping to the 2nd division in 2000 and finally returning to the Premier League in 2001.

=== The 2000's ===
The 2004 Premier League season was without a doubt the club's best year in terms of on-field performance. The club earned 2nd spot on the Premier League table and played in the grand final. Adelaide Olympic in 2005 once again finished second. Following the loss of several key players, Adelaide Olympic was relegated at the end of the 2006 season. Seasons 2007, '08, and '09 were spent languishing mid-table in the second division and a massive amount of debt being accumulated.

During the end of the 2009 season, a number of key figures within the Adelaide Greek community joined forces to rescue Adelaide Olympic. A new board was elected and got on with job of sorting out the club's finances. Former Socceroo Branko Milosevic was appointed as first team coach and number of former players returned.

=== The 2010s ===
In 2011, Adelaide Olympic became the sole tenant of Ferryden Park Reserve, which has become affectionately known as "Olympic Park". 2011 also saw the arrival of many talented players to the u-19 squad, providing strong competition to the reserve & first team squads. The first team finished 5th and lost the semi-final of the play-offs. 2012 season started with the appointment of Shane Porter to the first team position. However, due to a poor start to the season, the board decided to part ways with Porter and appointed Zoran Karadzic. Following a disappointing season, Adelaide Olympic announced the appointment of former Olympians player and U18 coach George Konstandopoulos as first team coach for the 2013 season. The appointment was primarily due to his successful work as the U18 coach and the club's expressed desire to promote youth. Despite not achieving promotion, the 2013 season was deemed successful given that many youth players were promoted to the first team, with the lowest average age in a single game being 18.3. Many of these players were later selected to join Adelaide United.

Season 2014 started with a continued focus on youth, however eight rounds into the season Adelaide Olympic parted ways with Konstandopoulos. Branko Milosevic was appointed to the first team coaching position for the remainder of the season. The club finished in 5th position and made the play-offs, falling short in the semi-final.

=== The campaign towards promotion ===
Preparations for 2015 commenced with the former Scottish Premier League player Alby Kidd to senior role, with Branko Milosevic alongside. Top goalscorer and Italian import Fausto Erba was to thank for most of Olympic's goals that season. Adelaide Olympic were to play two legs against long-time rivals Port Pirates. After a 1–1 draw, Adelaide Olympic came at the Pirate Park and won by 0–4. After 10 years, Adelaide Olympic returned to the Premier League.

On 22 June 2019, Olympic qualified for the Round of 32 of the FFA Cup for the first time by beating Adelaide City 3–2 in the FFSA Federation Cup final. They advanced to the Round of 16 by defeating Floreat Athena 4–3 with Fausto Erba and Ioannis Simosis scoring twice each.

== Notable former players ==
- Robert Cornthwaite
- Bruce Kamau
- Nathan Konstandopoulos
- Branko Milosevic
- Paul Pezos
- Ruon Tongyik
- Michael Valkanis
- Kristi Vangjeli
- Evan Kostopoulos

== Honours ==
=== State ===
- South Australian First Division Championship

Runner-up (1): 2004

- South Australian First Division Premiership

Runner-up (1): 2004

- South Australian Second Division Championship

Winners (3): 1992, 1995, 2000
Runner-up (2): 1991, 2015

- South Australian Second Division Premiership

Winners (1): 1992

- South Australian Third Division Championship

Winners (1): 1981
Runner-up (1): 1983

- Federation Cup

Winners (2): 2019, 2021
Runner-up (1): 1993

- Night Series

Runner-up (1): 2005

== Affiliated clubs ==
- PAOK FC – Olympic developed a partnership with the Super League Greece club PAOK which was announced on 11 July 2019. The partnership allows the exchange of coaches between the two clubs and for Olympic youth to participate in PAOK's youth tournaments.
