= Adelaide Blue Eagles =

Football club in South Australia

- Full name: Azzurri Sports Club Inc
- Nicknames: Blue Eagles, Azzurri, ABE
- Founded: 1958; 68 years ago
- Ground: Marden Sports Complex
- Capacity: 6,000
- Chairman: Rep Giordano
- Senior Coach: Andrej Rastovac
- League: SA State League 1
- 2026: 5th of 12; Finals: Semi-finals
- Website: www.azzurri.net.au
Home colours	Away colours

The Azzurri Sports Club is home to the Adelaide Blue Eagles (ABE), a soccer club based at the Marden Sports Complex, South Australia. It has formerly been known as Napoli Sports Club, Eastern Districts, Eastern Districts Napoli Sports Club, and Eastern Districts Azzurri. Blue Eagles is a participant in the National Premier Leagues South Australia. ABE is a predominantly Italian Australian-supported club.

== History ==
- The club was founded in June 1958 as the Napoli Sports Club, owing to most of the inaugural members originating from the Campania region around Naples in Italy. The name was changed to Eastern Districts due to the (then governing body) South Australian Soccer Football Association's ruling of only allowing one Italian named club in the local competition. The club was incorporated as Eastern Districts Napoli Sports Club, with the team known as Eastern Districts, as it represented a number of eastern suburbs of Adelaide.
- The club entered a team in the Metropolitan League in 1959 and played its first game against Edinburgh, losing 11–1. At first all home games were played at the Victoria Park Racecourse, then in the South Parklands, followed by Adey Reserve in Firle. The club moved to the new facilities at Marden in 2000.
- In 1962 the club played under the name of Eastern Districts Napoli and in 1966 adopted the name Eastern Districts Azzurri. In 1968 the club amalgamated with Seacliff Austria, which enabled them to acquire a place in the 1st division. In 1993 the club changed its name to Adelaide Blue Eagles, with the intention of broadening its appeal.
- Since its inception the club has been very successful particularly in the last decade. It has established itself as one of the leaders of local football both on and off the field, fielding many teams at all levels.
- They currently run a side which competes in the Amateur League, called MSSC Blue Eagles. MSSC stands for Molinara Sports & Social Club.

== Current squad ==
As of 2022 the main squad includes:

Note: Flags indicate national team as defined under FIFA eligibility rules; some limited exceptions apply. Players may hold more than one non-FIFA nationality.

No.	Pos.	Nation	Player
11		ARG	Agustín Moreira
5		AUS	Christopher Annicchiarico
6		AUS	Brylon Nthoane
7		AUS	Sheikman Hutton-Addy
8		AUS	Damien Crettenden
9		ARG	Dante Isla
10		ITA	Gianmarco Mancini
26		AUS	Evan Kounavelis
13		ERI	Alemayo Kebede
14		AUS	Stefan Gluscevic

No.	Pos.	Nation	Player
15		AUS	Christian D'Angelo
16		AUS	Hamish McCabe
17		AUS	Liam McCabe
20		AUS	Julian Spadavecchia
21		AUS	Beau Ieraci
24		AUS	Antoni Panagoulias
23		AUS	Adrian Barone
25		AUS	Jack Vanderhaak
—		AUS	Nikolas Harpas

== Club honours ==
1st Division Champions: 10

1981, 1982, 1992, 1994, 1995, 1996, 2000, 2001, 2003 and 2011

Federation Cup Winners: 6

1984, 1986, 1995, 1997, 1998 and 2010

1st Division Minor Premiers: 6

1992, 1993, 1995, 2000, 2001 and 2002

Coca-Cola Cup Winners: 3

1981, 1982 & 1990

== Former players ==
- Peter Deng, later in the South Sudan national football team
- Thomas Deng, later in the Australia national football team
