= Port Adelaide SC =

- Full name: Port Adelaide Soccer (Football) Club
- Nickname: The Pirates
- Founded: 1903; 123 years ago as Woodville; 1905; 121 years ago as Port Adelaide
- Ground: Ngarrpadla (Aunty) Josie Agius Reserve (formerly known as Taperoo Reserve)
- Coordinates: -34.8051755,138.5009125
- Chairperson: James Coley
- Manager: Joe Allison
- League: SA State League 2 North
- 2025: 5th of 8
- Website: https://www.portpirates.com.au/
Home colours	Away colours

Port Adelaide Soccer Club (PASC), originally Port Adelaide British Football Club and also known as the Port Adelaide Pirates, is a semi-professional soccer club based in Taperoo, a north-western suburb of Adelaide in the City of Port Adelaide Enfield. The club plays in State League 2 South Australia after being relegated to the fourth tier of Australian soccer in 2023.

Port Adelaide is the oldest surviving soccer club in South Australia, having been founded in 1905 after being one of two clubs to be created out of Woodville FC, which had been formed in 1903. From 1993 until 2018, the club was known as Port Adelaide Lion following a merger with Ukrainian Sports Club Lion. This was one of the club's many mergers, including earlier ones with Cheltenham in 1914 and Port Thistle in 1956. In the beginning, Port Adelaide SC played at a ground adjacent to Alberton Oval. It has been based at their current home ground, Ngarrpadla Josie Agius Reserve, since 2019, after moving from their previous home at John Hart Reserve.

The club has won five first division titles, the last coming in 1931, and the Federation Cup on four occasions, most recently in 1979.

== History ==
Efforts to form a Port Adelaide-based club date back to the first season of organised competition in South Australia in 1903, when an advertisement was printed in The Advertiser for a meeting at the Railway Hotel on 14 April 1903. However, it did not appear in the papers until the day after the meeting was scheduled, and the inaugural season was contested with just three teams, North Adelaide, South Adelaide, and Woodville.

The club was founded in 1905, making it the oldest surviving soccer club in South Australia. It was originally called Port Adelaide British Football Club. The founders included F.Salmon, G.Haywood, J.Haywood, EP Rowley, F.Meakin, and J.McColl. The club was founded after Woodville FC (1903) split into two clubs, the other being Hindmarsh. It started off playing at a site adjancent to Alberton Oval.

The amalgamation of Port Adelaide and Cheltenham British Football Club was formalised on Friday 26 March 1914 in the Globe Hotel, Port Adelaide. There were elements of the Cheltenham Club who did not agree with the merger and they formed another Cheltenham Club for the 1914 season.

The club played at John Hart Reserve from 1922 until 2018.

At the end of the 1941 season the club went into recess and did not field a team in the local competition until 1944, due to members' participation and casualties in World War II.

In 1956 the club merged with Port Thistle S.C., which had been known as the Port Presbyterian Thistle S.C. Their home ground was Nazar Reserve, across the road from the Port Adelaide Club. The ground was also known as Stevedores Paddock, because horses used on the wharves were left in the paddock. The area was notorious for getting flooded every time there was an extra high tide in the Port River.

The club played at John Hart Reserve for over 75 years except for a period in 1955 and 1956 when they moved to Allenby Gardens Reserve while John Hart Reserve was being redeveloped. There was also a period in the late 1960s and early 1970s when the club played its home games at the old ICI Oval at Peterhead while using John Hart Reserve for training and amateur games.

In 1993 the club merged with the Ukrainian Sports Club Lion to form the Port Adelaide Lion Soccer club, known as the Pirates. In 2002, all teams PALSC teams started playing under the unofficial name of the "Pirates".

On Tuesday 10 July 2018, life and financial members voted on a motion to change the official name of the club from Port Adelaide Lion Soccer Club Inc. to Port Adelaide Soccer Club Inc. in order to provide a simple, clear identity and name for members and others. The motion was passed, with 49 persons in favour and 16 against. The "Pirates" nickname was not a part of the motion, but remains the moniker of the club.

On 4 August 2018, after drawing 1–1 against Western Strikers, they finished 11th in the 2018 State League 1 season, relegating them to State League 2.

In September 2018, the club moved to a new purpose-built facility named Taperoo Reserve, in Taperoo.

The senior team finished 3rd at the conclusion of the 2019 State League 2 season, but failed to secure promotion back to State League 1 via the Finals Series, losing their Elimination Final match against Adelaide Cobras at Taperoo Reserve on penalties following a 2–2 draw. The club was named Football SA 2019 Club of the Year.

The COVID-19 pandemic impacted the 2020 State League 2 senior team's season. After finishing in 4th place at the end of the regular season, they lost their home Elimination Final against Adelaide University 2–1, after initially leading the game. However, the U14 side won the Championship and the U16's finished in 2nd place in their respective JPL C competitions. In 2020 the club also fielded a team in the U15 Girls' competition.

Ryan Mogg joined as head coach in 2021, with Lewis Vallelonga taking on the role of senior assistant coach and technical director. The Senior team secured the State League 2 Premiership on the last day of the season with a 4–1 victory over Gawler Eagles, which was enough to leapfrog Adelaide University. This first place finish also guaranteed promotion to State League 1 for the 2022 season.

== Home ground ==
Port Adelaide SC's home ground was formerly known as Taperoo Reserve. On 15 February 2021, the City of Port Adelaide Enfield officially renamed the reserve Ngarrpadla (Nar-pud-lah; meaning "Auntie" in Kaurna) Josie Agius Reserve, in honour of Aboriginal health worker and educator Josie Agius, who lived in Taperoo.

== Club honours ==
As Port Adelaide

- 1st Division Champions: 1911, 1912, 1926, 1927, 1931, 1934 (Pt.Thistle) & 1937 (Pt.Thistle)
- 2nd Division Champions: 1939, 1948 (Pt.Thistle), 1956, 1969, 1979 & 1988
- Federation Cup Winners: 1926, 1933, 1934 (Pt.Thistle), 1945 & 1979

As USC Lion

- 1st Division Champions: 1965
- 2nd Division Champions: 1954 & 1964
- Federation Cup Winners: 1956 & 1961

As Port Adelaide Lion/Port Adelaide Pirates

- Premier League Premiers: 1994 & 1999
- NPL State League Champions: 2014
- Football SA Club of Year: 2019
- State League 2 Premiers: 2021

== Notable players ==
- (Australia) Dianne Alagich
- (Australia) Richie Alagich
- (Australia) Charles Perkins
- (Australia) John Kundereri Moriarty
- (Australia) Dario Vidošić
- (England) Derek Acorah
