= Adelaide Croatia Raiders SC =

Football club in South Australia

Adelaide Croatia Raiders
- Full name: Adelaide Croatia Raiders Soccer Club
- Nicknames: Croatia, Raiders
- Founded: 1952; 74 years ago
- Ground: Croatian Sports Centre, Adelaide
- President: Phil Friscic
- Coach: Phil Scardigno
- League: NPL South Australia
- 2026: SA State League 1; 1st of 12 (premiers, promoted); Finals: Champions
- Website: https://www.croatiaraiders.com.au/
Home colours	Away colours

Adelaide Croatia Raiders SC, formerly known as Adelaide Raiders and historically Adelaide Croatia, is a semi-professional soccer club based in Adelaide, South Australia, they currently play in the South Australian State League 1. It is a Croatian Australian-backed club and its home ground is the Croatian Sports Centre in Gepps Cross, a northern suburb of Adelaide.

== History ==
The Adelaide Croatia Soccer Club was founded in 1952 by a group of Croatian migrants who named the club after their homeland. The group included Fahrudin Cerić, the then President, Cvjetko Milanović and Drago Pišpek.

The club affiliated with the SASFA and played in the metropolitan division for five years. Its first game was against a team from the (now closed) Philips factory at Hendon. Its first home ground was in the South Parklands on Greenhill Rd.

In 1960 the club moved to its new headquarters at Hanson Reserve. It remained there until 2000, when it moved to the sporting complex at Gepps Cross.

The 1960s proved to be a successful decade for the club in the South Australian State League, finishing in third place in 1961, 1962 and 1963, while finishing Runner-Up in 1965 and 1969. Despite these strong results they didn't win first place first place in the South Australian State League until 1980. Since then Croatia has won the league on another four occasions: in 1984, 1988, 1997 and 2002.

In 1962 the club competed in the inaugural Australian Cup, the first nationwide club tournament held in Australia. Croatia Adelaide were one of 16 participants in the knock-out competition and were the first Croatian backed club to compete. The side lost its first round match, losing to Brunswick Juventus 3–1 at Melbourne's Olympic Park to see the club knocked out. The club would again compete in the Australian Cup twice more in 1963 and 1965.

The year 1977 saw the formation of the National Soccer League. Following the failure of Melbourne Croatia and Sydney Croatia in their applications for the league, Adelaide Croatia led a move backed by the Croatian Soccer Association of Australia which saw a proposal put forward for a Croatian 'super club' to enter the NSL; a club which would see the resources of all of Australia's Croatian clubs pooled together. Ultimately the submission failed.

A major highlight in the club's history came in 1985; as the champions of South Australia, Adelaide Croatia was invited to take part in the National Soccer League Cup. Adelaide Croatia had a remarkable run defeating both of Adelaide's NSL sides, Adelaide City and West Adelaide, 1–0 in the opening two rounds. The club lost in the quarter-finals to another NSL side, Sunshine George Cross. It was a valiant display seeing Croatia go down 1–0 in a tightly fought match.

Midway through the 2010 season John Kosmina who managed Adelaide United and Sydney FC in the A-League was announced as the new coach for the Raiders.

In 2013, the Raiders made the finals series of the FFSA Premier League following a fifth placed league finish. The finals run came to a quick end after going down to Campbelltown City on penalties at the first hurdle.

The Raiders narrowly avoided relegation in the 2015 season, finishing above relegated sides Port Adelaide Lion and Modbury Jets on goal difference alone, with all three sides finishing the season with 27 points.

Prior to the start of the 2016 season, former international striker Joel Porter was announced as the new head coach, but they parted ways only nine rounds into the NPLSA season, with the club languishing in bottom place. Although Porter was replaced by former Raiders player Robert Matosevic, they finished bottom of the league and were relegated to the 2017 State League 1.

In 2018 they earned promotion back in to the NPL by reaching the 2nd division play-off series final against the minor premiers Adelaide Blue Eagles.

In 2021 the club reintroduced "Croatia" back into its name, after the new policy released from Football Australia which allows clubs to revert to their traditional names and symbols.

== Current squad ==
Note: Flags indicate national team as defined under FIFA eligibility rules; some limited exceptions apply. Players may hold more than one non-FIFA nationality.

No.	Pos.	Nation	Player
34	GK	AUS	Tumbika Kalua
29	DF	AUS	Jack Osterstock
10	FW	AUS	Kaelan Laird
4	DF	USA	Ethan Anderson
9	MF	AUS	Isaac Matikula
7	MF	AUS	Onyelukachi Chikwuba
21	MF	AUS	Jacob Hewett
14	FW	AUS	Oliver Zafiridis (Captain)
8	MF	AUS	Lochlan Czapla
95	FW	GAM	Salifu Jatta
12	MF	AUS	Matheus Rodrigues

No.	Pos.	Nation	Player
42	FW	AUS	Philimen Uwineza
19	DF	AUS	Lachlan Docherty
13	MF	AUS	Leon Scardigno
22	MF	AUS	Zake Scardigno
88	GK	AUS	Lachlan Wishart
23	MF	AUS	Jai King-Byrne
11	MF	AUS	Mason Ayoubi
26	DF	JPN	Yuto Ikeda
5	MF	AUS	Nguet Deng
41	DF	AUS	Johnny Finamore
—		AUS	

== Honours ==
- South Australian Champions: 1980, 1984, 1988, 1997, 2002
- South Australian Runner-Up: 1965, 1969, 1983, 1986, 1990, 1992, 1995, 2005, 2007
- South Australian Minor-Premiers: 1997
- South Australian Regular Season Runner-Up: 1992, 1995, 2005
- Federation Cup Winners: 1960, 1962, 1974, 1977, 1982, 1988, 1990, 1991, 1992, 2003
- Federation Cup Runner-Up: 1959, 1998, 2005
- Errea Cup: 2007
- Coca-Cola (Top 4) Cup Winners: 1984
- Ampol Cup Winners: 1961, 1989, 1990
- South Australian Division One Champions: 1959, 1972, 1975, 2023
- South Australian Division One Minor-Premiers: 2023, 2026
- Australian Croatian Soccer Tournament: 1984, 1995, 1997, 2002, 2009

== Individual honours ==
Sergio Melta Medal – South Australian Player of the Year

- 1965 – Billy Graham
- 2004 – Richie Alagich
- 2006 – Michael Cartwright
- 2009 – Richie Alagich
- 2010 – Richie Alagich
- 2012 – Nicky Orr

== See also ==
- List of Croatian football clubs in Australia
- Australian-Croatian Soccer Tournament
- Croatian Australian
