= Campbelltown City SC =

Australian association football club

Campbeltown City SC
- Full name: Campbeltown City Soccer and Social Club
- Nickname: Red Devils
- Founded: 1963; 63 years ago
- Ground: Steve Woodcock Sports Centre, Newton
- Capacity: 3,000
- Chairman: Don Leombruno
- Head coach: Daniel Mullen
- League: NPL South Australia
- 2026: 8th of 12
- Website: www.campbelltowncsc.org.au
Home colours	Away colours

Campbelltown City Soccer Club is an Australian association football club based in Adelaide, South Australia. Campbelltown competes in Australia's second-tier, NPL South Australia, playing home matches at Newton Village Sports Complex and are the local club of the Campbelltown-Newton area in Adelaide's north-east suburbs.

== History ==
Campbelltown City Soccer & Social Club "Red Devils" were formed by Joe Natale and other Italian Migrants in 1963, needed players to field a side when they debuted in the old SA third division the following year. But Natale's recruitment drive faced some hurdles, not least City's tin shed change room and the patch of dirt which passed as its original pitch. Campbelltown claimed its maiden league title in 1966 and won promotion to the SA top flight eight years later. In 1975 they amalgamated with Burnside Budapest, who competed in the original Australia Cup under Adelaide Budapest. In 2020 Campbelltown were NPL1 champions of South Australia for the third successive season.

== Current squad ==
Note: Flags indicate national team as defined under FIFA eligibility rules; some limited exceptions apply. Players may hold more than one non-FIFA nationality.

No.	Pos.	Nation	Player
1	GK	AUS	Luca Meggetto
2	FW	AUS	Joshua Bracchi
3	DF	AUS	Barnaby Wood
4	DF	AUS	Connor Centofanti
5	MF	AUS	Adam Leombruno
6	MF	AUS	James Boffa
7	FW	AUS	Joel Allwright
8	MF	AUS	Alex Mullen (Captain)
9	FW	AUS	Marc Marino
10	FW	AUS	Joshua Barresi
11	FW	AUS	Joshua Mori

No.	Pos.	Nation	Player
12	DF	AUS	Nicholas Graves
14	MF	AUS	Adam Piscioneri
15	MF	AUS	Antony Piscioneri
16	MF	AUS	Harvey Steele
17	DF	AUS	Brandon Centofanti
18	DF	AUS	Jordan Elsey
19	FW	AUS	James Carrocci
20	GK	AUS	Matthew Centofanti
21	DF	AUS	Jordan Maricic
22	FW	AUS	Alessio Melisi
23	FW	NZL	Kwabena Appiah-Kubi

== Honours ==
=== National ===
- National Premier Leagues
  - Winners (1): 2018

=== State ===
- South Australian First Division Championship
  - Winners (7): 1986, 2013, 2016, 2018, 2019, 2020, 2024
  - Runners-up (1): 1994
- South Australian First Division Premiership
  - Winners (2): 2018, 2019
  - Runners-up (4): 1998, 2009, 2016, 2020
- South Australian Second Division Championship
  - Winners (3): 1973, 1978, 2003
- South Australian Second Division Premiership
  - Winners (2): 1993, 2003
  - Runner-up (1): 1992
- South Australian Third Division Championship
  - Winners (2): 1966, 1971
- Federation Cup
  - Winners (2): 1985, 1994
  - Runner-up (6): 1976, 1977, 1978, 1984, 1987, 2009, 2023
- Second Division Cup
  - Runners-up (2): 1973, 1978
- Third Division Cup
  - Winner (2): 1966, 1971
- Night Series
  - Winners (1): 2009
  - Runner-up (1): 2002
