= 2019 Capital Football season =

(Australian Capital Territory) Capital Football
- Season: 2019
- Champions: Gungahlin United
- Federation Cup Winners: Tigers FC
- Premiers: Canberra Olympic

The 2019 Capital Football season saw a new competition format for the top two men’s divisions in the Australian Capital Territory. The Capital League (former second division) became linked to the National Premier League (first division) with the introduction of a two-step plan to establish promotion and relegation between the two divisions, as well as a re-branding of both divisions to National Premier League 1 (NPL1) and National Premier League 2 (NPL2). The NPL1 Premier qualified for the 2019 National Premier Leagues final series and the Federation Cup winner qualified for the 2019 FFA Cup.

== 2019 National Premier Leagues Capital Football ==
(Australian Capital Territory) National Premier Leagues
- Season: 2019
- Dates: 5 April 2019 — 14 September 2019
- Champions: Gungahlin United
- Premiers: Canberra Olympic
- Matches: 76
- Goals: 300 (3.95 per match)
- Top goalscorer: Stephen Dominici (18 goals)
- Biggest home win: Canberra 9–0 Riverina Rhinos (27 July 2019)
- Biggest away win: Riverina Rhinos 1–7 Gungahlin United (3 August 2019)
- Highest scoring: Canberra Olympic 8–1 Riverina Rhinos (1 June 2019); Gungahlin United 2–7 Canberra Olympic (30 June 2019); Canberra 9–0 Riverina Rhinos (27 July 2019)
- Longest winning run: Tigers FC, Gungahlin United (5 matches)
- Longest unbeaten run: Canberra Olympic, Gungahlin United (7 matches)
- Longest winless run: Riverina Rhinos (16 matches)
- Longest losing run: Riverina Rhinos (9 matches)

Re-branded NPL1 in 2019, this was the ACT’s highest senior men’s division. Nine teams competed, with the team finishing last in NPL1 relegated to NPL2 for the following season.

Pos	Team	Pld	W	D	L	GF	GA	GD	Pts	Qualification or relegation
1	Canberra Olympic	16	12	1	3	48	19	+29	37	2019 National Premier Leagues Finals
2	Tigers FC	16	10	2	4	33	22	+11	32	2019 ACT Finals
3	Gungahlin United (C)	16	11	1	4	48	21	+27	28 (Note: Capital Football docked six points from Gungahlin United, after the club failed to meet payment arrangements for a historic debt.)	2019 ACT Finals
4	Canberra FC	16	8	2	6	39	27	+12	26	2019 ACT Finals
5	Belconnen United	16	7	2	7	29	26	+3	23	
6	Tuggeranong United	16	7	0	9	22	28	−6	21	
7	Monaro Panthers	16	6	2	8	31	33	−2	20	
8	Woden Weston	16	3	3	10	17	40	−23	12	
9	Riverina Rhinos (R)	16	1	1	14	12	64	−52	4	Relegation to the 2020 NPL ACT 2

Source: sportstg.com
Rules for classification: 1) points; 2) goal difference; 3) number of goals scored.
(C) Champions; (R) Relegated

=== Finals ===
Semi-finals
1	Canberra Olympic	0
2	Tigers FC	1
3	Gungahlin United	5
4	Canberra FC	2

Preliminary Final
1	Canberra Olympic	1
3	Gungahlin United	2

Grand Final
2	Tigers FC	0
3	Gungahlin United	5

=== Season statistics ===
==== Top scorers ====
Rank	Player	Club	Goals
1	Stephen Domenici	Canberra Olympic	17
2	Joshua Gulevski	Monaro Panthers	14
2	Michael John	Gungahlin United	14
4	Nicolas Abot	Tigers FC	12
5	Daniel Barac	Canberra	11
5	Jeremy Habtemariam	Gungahlin United	11
5	Mark Shields	Tigers FC	11
8	Riley Angelosante	Gungahlin United	9
9	Nikolas Popovich	Canberra Olympic	8

== 2019 National Premier Leagues Capital Football 2 ==
(Australian Capital Territory) NPL Capital Football 2
- Season: 2019
- Champions: ANU FC
- Premiers: Canberra White Eagles
- Matches: 72
- Goals: 264 (3.67 per match)
- Top goalscorer: Rowan Peterkin (13 goals)
- Biggest home win: 11–0; ANU FC vs Southern Tablelands; 21 July 2019
- Biggest away win: 0–9; Narrabundah FC vs ANU FC; 13 July 2019
- Highest scoring: 11 goals (see biggest home win)

Replacing the Capital League, 2019 was the first season of NPL2 as the ACT’s second senior men’s division. The competition was a double round-robin played over 18 rounds, with no promotion to the NPL1, followed by an end of season finals competition.

Pos	Team	Pld	W	D	L	GF	GA	GD	Pts	Qualification or relegation
1	Canberra White Eagles	16	11	3	2	44	15	+29	36	2019 NPL2 ACT Finals
2	O'Connor Knights	16	11	3	2	44	17	+27	36	2019 NPL2 ACT Finals
3	ANU FC (C)	16	11	1	4	52	13	+39	34	2019 NPL2 ACT Finals
4	Queanbeyan City	16	9	2	5	27	22	+5	29	2019 NPL2 ACT Finals
5	Weston Molonglo FC	16	8	3	5	26	22	+4	27	
6	Wagga City Wanderers	16	7	1	8	29	27	+2	22	
7	Southern Tablelands United	16	3	1	12	15	53	−38	10	
8	Narrabundah FC	16	2	2	12	14	43	−29	8	
9	Brindabella Blues	16	2	0	14	14	53	−39	6	

Source: soccerway
Rules for classification: 1) points; 2) goal difference; 3) number of goals scored.
(C) Champions

=== Finals ===
Semi-finals
1	Canberra White Eagles	2 (4)
2	O'Connor Knights	2 (5)
3	ANU FC	2
4	Queanbeyan City	1

Preliminary Final
1	Canberra White Eagles	0
3	ANU FC	1

Grand Final
2	O'Connor Knights	1
3	ANU FC	5

== 2019 Capital Football State League 1 ==
(Australian Capital Territory) State League 1
- Season: 2019
- Champions: UC Pumas
- Premiers: UC Pumas
- Matches: 85
- Goals: 434 (5.11 per match)
- Top goalscorer: Samuel Isabella (28 goals)

The 2019 ACT Capital Football Division 1 (also known as State League 1) is the fifth edition of the Capital League Division 1 as ACT's third senior men’s division. The 2019 season consists of 18 rounds with four matches played per round.

Pos	Team	Pld	W	D	L	GF	GA	GD	Pts	Qualification or relegation
1	UC Pumas (C)	18	14	2	2	57	24	+33	44	2019 SL1 Finals
2	ADFA Vikings	18	13	2	3	71	30	+41	41	2019 SL1 Finals
3	Weston Molonglo B	18	12	4	2	60	23	+37	40	2019 SL1 Finals
4	Belconnen United B	18	12	0	6	55	28	+27	36	2019 SL1 Finals
5	Narrabundah B	18	7	2	9	25	52	−27	23	
6	Tigers FC B	18	7	1	10	36	56	−20	22	
7	Monaro Panthers B	18	6	1	11	33	54	−21	19	
8	ANU FC B	18	5	1	12	26	53	−27	16	
9	Belsouth	18	3	2	13	35	57	−22	11	
10	Canberra City	18	3	1	14	36	57	−21	10	

Source: sportstg.com
Rules for classification: 1) points; 2) goal difference; 3) number of goals scored.
(C) Champions

=== Finals ===
Semi-finals
1	UC Pumas	3
2	ADFA Vikings	1
3	Weston Molonglo	1
4	Belconnen United	0

Preliminary Final
2	ADFA Vikings	1
3	Weston Molonglo	0

Grand Final
1	UC Pumas	2
2	ADFA Vikings	0

== 2019 Women's National Premier Leagues ACT ==
(Australian Capital Territory) NPLW Capital Football
- Season: 2019
- Champions: Belconnen United
- Premiers: Belconnen United

The highest tier domestic football competition in the ACT is known as the ACT Women's National Premier Leagues (WNPL). Each team played each other twice for a total of 16 rounds, plus a finals series for the top 4 teams.

Pos	Team	Pld	W	D	L	GF	GA	GD	Pts	Qualification or relegation
1	Belconnen United (C)	16	15	1	0	105	2	+103	46	2019 ACT WNPL Finals
2	Canberra FC	16	12	2	2	86	10	+76	38	2019 ACT WNPL Finals
3	Canberra United Academy	16	10	1	5	55	27	+28	31	2019 ACT WNPL Finals
4	Gungahlin United	16	9	2	5	41	27	+14	29	2019 ACT WNPL Finals
5	Woden-Weston FC	16	9	1	6	37	33	+4	28	
6	Tuggeranong United	16	4	1	11	14	67	−53	13	
7	Wagga City Wanderers	16	3	0	13	17	81	−64	9	
8	Monaro Panthers	16	2	2	12	20	60	−40	8	
9	Canberra Olympic	16	2	2	12	13	75	−62	8	

Source: sportstg.com
Rules for classification: 1) points; 2) goal difference; 3) number of goals scored.
Notes:
(C) Champions

=== Finals ===
Semi-finals
1	Belconnen United	2
2	Canberra FC	0
3	CU Academy	4
4	Gungahlin United	2

Preliminary Final
2	Canberra FC	4
3	CU Academy	1

Grand Final
1	Belconnen United	1
2	Canberra FC	0

== 2019 Federation Cup ==
(Australian Capital Territory) 2019 Federation Cup
Tournament details
- Dates: 5 March–15 June 2019
- Teams: 17

Final positions
- Champions: Tigers FC (1st title)
- Runners-up: Canberra FC

Tournament statistics
- Matches played: 19
- Goals scored: 142 (7.47 per match)
- Top goal scorer(s): Sparrow; Giampaolo; Eljammoudi (3 goals)

2019 was the 57th edition of the Capital Football Federation Cup. The Federation cup acted as the preliminary rounds for the FFA Cup in the ACT, with the Cup winner entering the subsequent FFA Cup round of 32. Although open to all senior men's teams registered with Capital Football, entry to the competition was staggered, with NPL1 clubs entering the tournament in the second round. The competition ran from 5 March until 15 June.

Tigers FC secured its first Federation Cup title and qualification to the 2019 FFA Cup with a penalty shootout victory over Canberra FC at Deakin Stadium.

2019 Capital Football Federation Cup
Tie no	Home team (tier)	Score	Away team (tier)
Round 1
1	Brindabella Blues (3)	4–3†	Narrabundah FC (3)
2	Southern Tablelands United (3)	0–2	UC Pumas (4)
3	Weston-Molonglo (3)	4–1	Canberra City (4)
4	Wagga City Wanderers (3)	2–5	White Eagles (3)
Round 2
1	Canberra FC (2)	6–1	Brindabella Blues (3)
2	Gungahlin United (2)	4–1	UC Pumas (4)
Gungahlin United removed for fielding an ineligible player.
3	Belconnen United (2)	5–0	Weston-Molonglo (3)
4	Woden-Weston (2)	3–1	White Eagles (3)
5	Tuggeranong United (2)	4–1	O'Connor Knights (3)
6	Canberra Olympic (2)	2–1	Queanbeyan City (3)
7	Riverina Rhinos (2)	0–3	ANU FC (3)
8	Tigers FC (2)	1–0	Monaro Panthers (2)
Quarter-finals
1	Woden-Weston (2)	0–2	Tuggeranong United (2)
2	Canberra Olympic (2)	0–1	Canberra FC (2)
3	Tigers FC (2)	6–1	UC Pumas (4)
4	ANU FC (3)	2–0	Belconnen United (2)
Semi-finals
1	Tuggeranong United (2)	0–2	Tigers FC (2)
2	ANU FC (3)	1–2†	Canberra FC (2)
Final
1	Canberra FC (2)	0–0†	Tigers FC (2)
Tigers FC won 4–2 on penalties.

Notes

- † = After Extra Time

== 2019 Charity Shield ==
2019 is the fourth edition of the annual ACT Charity Shield contested to kick off the 2019 Capital Football season. Money raised from the event goes towards a nominated charity, which in 2019 was Salvation Army Canberra. Canberra FC and Gungahlin United contested the Shield in 2019. The matchup was a replay of the 2018 Federation Cup final. Canberra FC claimed its second Charity Shield title with a 2–1 victory thanks to an unfortunate own goal winner in the fifty-second minute.

29 March 2019	Canberra FC	2–1	Gungahlin United	Deakin, Canberra
18:30	Barac 21'; Abbas 52' (o.g.)	Report	Griffiths 24'	Stadium: Deakin Stadium

== See also ==
- Soccer in the Australian Capital Territory
- Sport in the Australian Capital Territory
