= 2018 National Premier Leagues =

National Premier Leagues
- Season: 2018
- Champions: Campbelltown City (1st title)
- Finalists: Campbelltown City; Canberra FC; Devonport City; Edgeworth Eagles; Heidelberg United; Lions FC; Perth SC; Sydney Olympic

The 2018 National Premier Leagues was the sixth season of the Australian National Premier Leagues soccer competition. The league competition was played amongst eight separate divisions, divided by FFA state and territory member federations. The divisions are ACT, NSW, Northern NSW, Queensland, South Australia, Tasmania, Victoria and Western Australia. The winners of each respective divisional league competed in a finals playoff tournament at season end, culminating in a Grand Final.

Campbelltown City were crowned National Premier Leagues Champions and qualified directly for the 2019 FFA Cup Round of 32.

== League tables ==
=== ACT ===
Pos	Team	Pld	W	D	L	GF	GA	GD	Pts	Qualification or relegation
1	Canberra (C)	16	12	2	2	46	13	+33	38	2018 National Premier Leagues Finals
2	Canberra Olympic	16	11	0	5	40	21	+19	33	2018 ACT Finals
3	Tigers FC	16	9	1	6	41	38	+3	28	2018 ACT Finals
4	Tuggeranong United	16	8	2	6	32	32	0	26	2018 ACT Finals
5	Belconnen United	16	7	3	6	30	29	+1	24	
6	Woden-Weston	16	4	6	6	32	36	−4	18	
7	Gungahlin United	16	4	4	8	21	25	−4	16	
8	Riverina Rhinos	16	5	1	10	20	39	−19	16	
9	Monaro Panthers	16	1	3	12	17	46	−29	6	

Source: sportstg.com
Rules for classification: 1) points; 2) goal difference; 3) number of goals scored.
(C) Champions

==== Finals ====
Semi-finals
1	Canberra FC	3
2	Canberra Olympic	5
3	Tigers FC (pen.)	2 (3)
4	Tuggeranong United	2 (2)

Preliminary Final
1	Canberra FC	5
3	Tigers FC	0

Grand Final
2	Canberra Olympic	1
1	Canberra FC	2

=== NSW ===
Pos	Team	Pld	W	D	L	GF	GA	GD	Pts	Qualification or relegation
1	Sydney Olympic (C)	22	15	3	4	40	19	+21	48	2018 National Premier Leagues Finals
2	APIA Leichhardt Tigers	22	14	3	5	62	28	+34	45	2018 NSW Finals
3	Sydney United 58	22	12	2	8	36	29	+7	38	2018 NSW Finals
4	Blacktown City	22	9	7	6	27	20	+7	34	2018 NSW Finals
5	Rockdale City Suns	22	9	4	9	39	43	−4	31	2018 NSW Finals
6	Marconi Stallions	22	8	6	8	30	34	−4	30	
7	Hakoah Sydney City East	22	8	4	10	33	32	+1	28	
8	Manly United	22	7	7	8	33	32	+1	28	
9	Wollongong Wolves	22	7	6	9	23	36	−13	27	
10	Sutherland Sharks	22	7	2	13	30	39	−9	23	
11	Bonnyrigg White Eagles (R)	22	6	4	12	30	51	−21	22	Relegation to the 2019 NPL NSW 2 (Note: Relegation based on Club Championship and including points from U20 and U18 teams.)
12	Sydney FC Youth	22	4	4	14	27	47	−20	16	

Source: sportstg.com
Rules for classification: 1) points; 2) goal difference; 3) number of goals scored.
(C) Champions; (R) Relegated

==== Finals ====
Qualifying final
2	APIA Leichhardt Tigers	0 (3)
3	Sydney United 58	0 (5)
4	Blacktown City	0
5	Rockdale City Suns	2

Major semi-final
1	Sydney Olympic	4
3	Sydney United 58	0
Minor semi-final
2	APIA Leichhardt Tigers	8
5	Rockdale City Suns	2

Preliminary final
3	Sydney United 58	1 (3)
2	APIA Leichhardt Tigers	1 (5)

Grand final
1	Sydney Olympic	3
2	APIA Leichhardt Tigers	1

=== Northern NSW ===
Pos	Team	Pld	W	D	L	GF	GA	GD	Pts	Qualification or relegation
1	Edgeworth Eagles	20	14	4	2	37	16	+21	46	2018 National Premier Leagues Finals
2	Broadmeadow Magic (C)	20	10	5	5	44	20	+24	35	2018 Northern NSW Finals
3	Maitland	20	9	7	4	38	21	+17	34	2018 Northern NSW Finals
4	Lambton Jaffas	20	9	7	4	35	21	+14	34	2018 Northern NSW Finals
5	Hamilton Olympic	20	10	3	7	41	31	+10	33	
6	Charlestown City Blues	20	10	1	9	30	31	−1	31	
7	Newcastle Jets Youth	20	7	3	10	32	45	−13	24	
8	Lake Macquarie City	20	6	2	12	35	42	−7	20	
9	Weston Workers	20	6	2	12	28	42	−14	20	
10	Adamstown Rosebud	20	5	5	10	24	48	−24	20	
11	Valentine FC	20	2	5	13	19	46	−27	11	

Source: sportstg.com
Rules for classification: 1) points; 2) goal difference; 3) number of goals scored.
(C) Champions

==== Finals ====
Semi-finals
1	Edgeworth Eagles (a.e.t.)	1	3	4
4	Lambton Jaffas	1	2	3
2	Broadmeadow Magic	3	0	3
3	Maitland	1	1	2

Grand Final
1	Edgeworth Eagles	0
2	Broadmeadow Magic	3

=== Queensland ===
Pos	Team	Pld	W	D	L	GF	GA	GD	Pts	Qualification or relegation
1	Lions FC (C)	26	23	0	3	84	11	+73	69	2018 National Premier Leagues Finals
2	Olympic FC	26	19	5	2	74	26	+48	62	2018 Queensland Finals
3	Western Pride	26	19	0	7	96	33	+63	57	2018 Queensland Finals
4	Moreton Bay United	26	17	4	5	60	35	+25	55	2018 Queensland Finals
5	Brisbane Strikers	26	16	2	8	74	31	+43	50	
6	Brisbane City	26	13	4	9	69	48	+21	43	
7	South West Queensland Thunder	26	10	4	12	46	60	−14	34	
8	Cairns FC	26	9	3	14	44	62	−18	30	Withdrew at end of season. (Note: Cairns and North Queensland United relinquished their NPL Queensland licence at the end of the season.)
9	Brisbane Roar Youth	26	8	4	14	35	59	−24	28	
10	Gold Coast United	26	8	3	15	38	67	−29	27	
11	Magpies Crusaders United	26	8	1	17	48	74	−26	25	
12	Redlands United	26	7	2	17	52	81	−29	23	
13	North Queensland United	26	6	1	19	35	71	−36	19	Withdrew at end of season. (Note: Cairns and North Queensland United relinquished their NPL Queensland licence at the end of the season.)
14	Sunshine Coast	26	1	3	22	20	117	−97	6 (Note: Sunshine Coast was reprieved from relegation following the withdrawal of Cairns FC and North Queensland United.)	

Source: sportstg.com
Rules for classification: 1) points; 2) goal difference; 3) number of goals scored.
(C) Champions

==== Finals ====
Semi-finals
1	Lions FC	1 (3)
4	Moreton Bay United	1 (1)
2	Olympic FC	2
3	Western Pride	1

Grand Final
1	Lions FC (a.e.t.)	2
2	Olympic FC	1

=== South Australia ===
Pos	Team	Pld	W	D	L	GF	GA	GD	Pts	Qualification or relegation
1	Campbelltown City (C)	22	16	3	3	54	24	+30	51	2018 National Premier Leagues Finals
2	North Eastern MetroStars	22	15	1	6	51	27	+24	46	2018 South Australia Finals
3	Adelaide Comets	22	13	5	4	40	26	+14	44	2018 South Australia Finals
4	Adelaide United Youth (Note: Adelaide United Youth cannot qualify for the National Premier Leagues finals series.)	22	10	5	7	42	29	+13	35	2018 South Australia Finals
5	Adelaide City (Note: Following a sanction by the independent Disciplinary Committee, Adelaide City had 18 competition points removed for the 2018 season, and a further 6 points for the 2019 season.)	22	14	4	4	52	19	+33	28	2018 South Australia Finals
6	Adelaide Olympic	22	7	7	8	28	25	+3	28	2018 South Australia Finals
7	West Adelaide	22	8	3	11	30	46	−16	27	
8	Para Hills Knights	22	8	1	13	27	38	−11	25	
9	South Adelaide Panthers	22	6	3	13	29	55	−26	21	
10	Croydon Kings	22	5	4	13	28	39	−11	19	
11	Sturt Lions (R)	22	5	4	13	24	48	−24	19	Relegation to the 2019 SA State League 1
12	West Torrens Birkalla (R)	22	4	2	16	20	49	−29	14	Relegation to the 2019 SA State League 1

Source: sportstg.com
Rules for classification: 1) points; 2) goal difference; 3) number of goals scored.
(C) Champions; (R) Relegated

==== Finals ====
Elimination finals
3	North Eastern MetroStars (a.e.t.)	1
6	Adelaide Olympic	0
4	Adelaide Comets	1
5	Adelaide United Youth	3

Semifinals
1	Adelaide City (a.e.t.)	0
2	Campbelltown City	0
North Eastern MetroStars	1
Adelaide United Youth	0

Preliminary final
Adelaide City	2
North Eastern MetroStars	0

Grand final
Campbelltown City	1
Adelaide City	0

=== Tasmania ===
Pos	Team	Pld	W	D	L	GF	GA	GD	Pts	Qualification or relegation
1	Devonport City (C)	21	16	2	3	69	18	+51	50	2018 National Premier Leagues Finals
2	South Hobart	21	15	2	4	63	32	+31	47	
3	Hobart Zebras	21	12	3	6	65	44	+21	39	
4	Launceston City	21	11	4	6	56	32	+24	37	
5	Olympia	21	9	3	9	45	40	+5	30	
6	Northern Rangers	21	6	2	13	39	68	−29	20	Moved to Northern Championship for 2019
7	Kingborough Lions United	21	4	3	14	35	54	−19	15	
8	Clarence United	21	0	3	18	16	100	−84	3	

Source: sportstg.com
Rules for classification: 1) points; 2) goal difference; 3) number of goals scored.
(C) Champions

=== Victoria ===
Pos	Team	Pld	W	D	L	GF	GA	GD	Pts	Qualification or relegation
1	Heidelberg United (C)	26	19	2	5	60	29	+31	59	2018 National Premier Leagues Finals
2	Bentleigh Greens	26	18	4	4	53	28	+25	58	2018 Victoria Finals
3	Pascoe Vale	26	13	6	7	42	31	+11	45	2018 Victoria Finals
4	Oakleigh Cannons	26	12	2	12	41	39	+2	38	2018 Victoria Finals
5	Avondale FC	26	17	4	5	57	32	+25	37 (Note: Avondale FC had eighteen points deducted for licence breaches in the 2018 and 2019 seasons.)	2018 Victoria Finals
6	Port Melbourne	26	10	6	10	37	41	−4	36	2018 Victoria Finals
7	Kingston City	26	10	4	12	39	45	−6	34	
8	Dandenong Thunder	26	11	1	14	45	55	−10	34	
9	Melbourne Knights	26	9	5	12	45	53	−8	32	
10	South Melbourne	26	8	4	14	48	53	−5	28	
11	Hume City	26	7	7	12	29	43	−14	28	
12	Green Gully	26	7	5	14	41	49	−8	26	2018 relegation play-offs
13	Northcote City (R)	26	5	7	14	32	53	−21	22	Relegation to the 2019 NPL Victoria 2
14	Bulleen Lions (R)	26	6	3	17	33	51	−18	21	Relegation to the 2019 NPL Victoria 2

Source: sportstg.com
Rules for classification: 1) points; 2) goal difference; 3) number of goals scored.
(C) Champions; (R) Relegated

==== Finals ====
Elimination Finals
3	Avondale FC	3
6	Port Melbourne	1
4	Pascoe Vale	1
5	Oakleigh Cannons	2

Semi-finals
1	Heidelberg United	1 (5)
5	Oakleigh Cannons	1 (3)
2	Bentleigh Greens	3
3	Avondale FC (a.e.t.)	4

Final
1	Heidelberg United	2
3	Avondale FC	1

=== Western Australia ===
Pos	Team	Pld	W	D	L	GF	GA	GD	Pts	Qualification or relegation
1	Perth SC (C)	26	17	4	5	55	26	+29	55	2018 National Premier Leagues Finals
2	Perth Glory Youth	26	16	6	4	72	32	+40	54	2018 Western Australia Finals
3	Cockburn City	26	14	6	6	59	40	+19	48	2018 Western Australia Finals
4	Bayswater City	26	15	2	9	55	30	+25	47	2018 Western Australia Finals
5	Inglewood United	26	13	7	6	50	38	+12	46	
6	ECU Joondalup	26	13	5	8	48	37	+11	44	
7	Floreat Athena	26	12	5	9	53	40	+13	41	
8	Sorrento	26	10	4	12	49	47	+2	34	
9	Stirling Lions	26	10	2	14	52	55	−3	32	
10	Armadale	26	9	5	12	48	52	−4	32	
11	Balcatta	26	9	2	15	40	59	−19	29	
12	Subiaco AFC (R)	26	7	5	14	29	46	−17	26	Relegation to the 2019 WA State League 1
13	Forrestfield United (R)	26	5	7	14	34	58	−24	22	Relegation to the 2019 WA State League 1
14	Joondalup United (R)	26	1	2	23	21	102	−81	5	Relegation to the 2019 WA State League 1

Source: sportstg.com
Rules for classification: 1) points; 2) goal difference; 3) number of goals scored.
(C) Champions; (R) Relegated

==== Finals ====
Semi-finals
1	Perth SC	3 (3)
2	Perth Glory Youth	3 (4)
3	Cockburn City	3 (5)
4	Bayswater City	3 (4)

Elimination Final
1	Perth SC	2
3	Cockburn City	1

Grand Final
2	Perth Glory Youth	1
1	Perth SC	4

== Final Series ==
The winner of each league competition (top of the table) in the NPL will compete in a single match knockout tournament to decide the National Premier Leagues Champion for 2018. The quarter final match-ups were decided by an open draw. Home advantage for the semi-finals and final is based on a formula relating to time of winning (normal time, extra time or penalties), goals scored and allowed, and yellow/red cards. The winner will additionally qualify for the 2019 FFA Cup Round of 32.

Club	Qualified From	Participation
Canberra FC	(Australian Capital Territory) ACT	3rd
Sydney Olympic	(New South Wales) NSW	1st
Edgeworth Eagles	(New South Wales) Northern NSW	4th
Lions FC	Queensland	1st
Campbelltown City	South Australia	1st
Devonport City	Tasmania	1st
Heidelberg United	(Victoria (state)) Victoria	2nd
Perth SC	Western Australia	2nd

Quarter-finals
(New South Wales) Sydney Olympic	1
(Western Australia) Perth SC	0
(Australian Capital Territory) Canberra FC	0
(South Australia) Campbelltown City	3
(Tasmania) Devonport City	2
(Victoria (state)) Heidelberg United	3
(Queensland) Lions FC	1
(New South Wales) Edgeworth Eagles	0

Semi-finals
(South Australia) Campbelltown City	2
(New South Wales) Sydney Olympic	1
(Queensland) Lions FC (p)	1 (3)
(Victoria (state)) Heidelberg United	1 (1)

Grand Final
(South Australia) Campbelltown City	2
(Queensland) Lions FC	1

=== Quarter-finals ===
8 September
18:00 AEST

Devonport City (Tasmania)	2–3	(Victoria (state)) Heidelberg United
Read 29' (o.g.); Mulraney 87'	Report	Ellis 44'; Schiavo 45'; Petrie 90+7'

Valley Road, Devonport
Attendance: 1,146
Referee: Tony Peart

15 September
17:00 AEST

Canberra FC (Australian Capital Territory)	0–3	(South Australia) Campbelltown City
	Report	Mullen 6'; Ditroia 78', 90+6'

Deakin Stadium, Canberra
Attendance: 360
Referee: Katie Patterson

15 September
19:30 AEST

Lions FC (Queensland)	1–0	(New South Wales) Edgeworth Eagles
Mádle 4'	Report

Lions Stadium, Brisbane
Attendance: 564
Referee: Adam Kersey

16 September
15:30 AEST

Sydney Olympic (New South Wales)	1–0	(Western Australia) Perth SC
Madonis 6'	Report

Lambert Park, Sydney
Attendance: 375
Referee: Stephen Lucas

=== Semi-finals ===
18 September
19:30 AEST

Lions FC (Queensland)	1–1 (a.e.t.)	(Victoria (state)) Heidelberg United
Shepherd 20'	Report	Ellis 73'
Penalties
Shepherd (penalty scored); Mádle (penalty missed); Jarad (penalty scored); Borean (penalty scored)	3–1	(penalty scored) Byles; (penalty missed) Ellis; (penalty missed) Cahill; (penalty missed) Way

Lions Stadium, Brisbane
Attendance: 902
Referee: Martin Krenes

22 September
15:00 ACST

Campbelltown City (South Australia)	2–1	(New South Wales) Sydney Olympic
Marino 43'; Fyfe 90+5' (pen.)	Report	Burgess 2'

Steve Woodcock Sports Centre, Adelaide
Attendance: 776
Referee: Daniel Cook

=== Grand Final ===
30 September
17:00 ACST

Campbelltown City (South Australia)	2–1	(Queensland) Lions FC
Ture 5', 32'	Report	Thompson 49'

Steve Woodcock Sports Centre, Adelaide
Attendance: 1,518
Referee: Lachlan Keevers
