= Southern Tablelands United FC =

- Full name: Southern Tablelands United Football Club
- Nicknames: STUFC, United, Steamers
- Founded: 2017
- Ground: Cookbundoon; Goulburn, NSW
- Capacity: 500
- Coordinates: 34°42′55.4″S 149°44′49.9″E
- Manager: Robin Caulfield
- League: Community League 3
- 2022: -
- Website: http://websites.sportstg.com/team_info.cgi?c=0-10664-0-517095-26427764&a=TEAMHOME
| Home colours | Away colours |

Southern Tablelands United FC is an Australian amateur association football club based in the NSW city of Goulburn. Founded in 2017, as a joint venture between the Goulburn Strikers and Goulbourn Stags, United is affiliated with Capital Football in the ACT. Southern Tablelands currently competes in the NPL2 for men's and NPLW for women's.

== History ==
Southern Tablelands United (STU) was established in 2017 as a joint venture between the Goulburn Strikers and Goulburn Stags. The new united venture partnered with STFA (Southern Tablelands Football Association) to create the new club. The two boards of the Strikers and Stags united in an effort to provide the best pathway for elite youngsters in Goulburn and the greater Southern Tablelands region. Goulbourn and Southern Tablelands leading youngsters will progress from the STFA youth representative teams through to the first grade of the men's and women's Southern Tablelands United teams.

In 2017, Capital Football approached the club to gauge if the region was interested in competing in NPL competitions in the future. Indicating a change to the current NPL and Capital League format to a linked NPL1 and NPL2 system was in the works.

In 2018, Southern Tablelands United formally became affiliated with Capital Football and joined the men's Capital league, second highest level in ACT football and third highest nationally.

STU's inaugural Capital League match saw the newly established club play the reigning Capital League champions, ANU FC, at ANU Willows in Acton, Canberra. STU suffered a heavy 2-12 defeat but Aaron Swanson scored a brace on debut to net the club's first ever goals.

1 April 2018, Southern Tablelands United were forced to make the decision to switch their home Federation Cup tie against Woden Valley from Goulburn to Canberra due to the only facility in Goulbourn meeting lighting and amenity standards, The Workers Arena, not being available. United's regular home ground, Cookbundoon fields, did not meet the standards needed for night time football. On the same day, Southern Tablelands Football Association announced submissions had been made to the local Goulburn Mulwaree municipality for a three-stage upgrade to Cookbundoon fields. The document submitted by STFA outlined stage one upgrades to include LED lighting, ground returfing, car park and intersection improvements, fencing and security improvements. Stage two would include amenity building, shelter and grandstand upgrades. The paper highlighted current problems including no separate change room for female players, lack of drainage on the playing surface and deficient toilet facilities.

In April 2018, United competed in the first round of the 2018 Capital Football Federation Cup, qualification tournament for the FFA Cup in the ACT. STU defeated Capital Football division one team, Woden Valley, 2-0. However, Woden lodged a formal protest complaint against Southern Tablelands for fielding a suspended player and Capital Football ruled in Woden's favour. The result against Woden was expunged and Woden Valley, not STU, progressed to the second round to play the O’Connor Knights. Southern Tablelands unsuccessfully appealed this decision to expel them from the tournament. Woden went on to lose 0-9 to O’Connor in the second round.

In September 2018, Southern Tablelands finished their first Capital Football season in 2018 in sixth position in the final standings. Recording six wins, two draws, and ten losses. STU missed out on qualification for the 2018 finals series. The opening match loss to ANU ended up as the largest away defeat recorded in the league for the season and the highest scoring match.

5 October 2018, United held its maiden club awards ceremony. David Albrighton was honoured with the inaugural Club person of the year award for his guiding work in forming the new partnership club. Aaron Swanson was announced the winner of the players player award while Josh Phelps won the coach's award, as selected by Capital League head coach Robin Caufield.

== Club identity ==
=== Colours and crest ===
Southern Tablelands United's colour scheme is dark blue, yellow and white. The crest is a shield design using these three colours, featuring the establishment of the club in 2017, and with a black and white train in the center.

=== Home ground and facilities ===
Since foundation in 2017, STU has played all home matches at Cookbundoon fields in Goulburn, NSW. In April 2018, the facilities at Cookbundoon fields were the subject of a proposal to local council for upgrade, including building work, new lighting, field maintenance and roadwork.

== Season-by-season results ==
The below table is updated with the statistics and final results for Southern Tablelands FC following the conclusion of each NPL 2 season.

| Champions | Runners-up | Third Place |

Southern Tablelands United Season-by-Season Results
| Ref | Season | ACT Capital League | | | | | | | | | | Fed Cup | FFA Cup | Top scorer | |
| Ref | Season | GP | W | D | L | GF | GA | GD | PTS | League | Finals | Fed Cup | FFA Cup | Name | Goals |
|---|---|---|---|---|---|---|---|---|---|---|---|---|---|---|---|
| | 2018 | 18 | 6 | 2 | 10 | 28 | 57 | −29 | 20 | 6th | - | 1R | - | Aaron Swanson | 12 |
| Ref | Season | National Premier League ACT 2 | | | | | | | | | | Fed Cup | FFA Cup | Top scorer | |
| Ref | Season | GP | W | D | L | GF | GA | GD | PTS | League | Finals | Fed Cup | FFA Cup | Name | Goals |
| | 2019 | 16 | 3 | 1 | 12 | 15 | 53 | -38 | 10 | 7th | - | - | - | Aaron Swanson | 7 |
| Ref | Season | Capital Football Community League 3 | | | | | | | | | | Fed Cup | FFA Cup | Top scorer | |
| Ref | Season | GP | W | D | L | GF | GA | GD | PTS | League | Finals | Fed Cup | FFA Cup | Name | Goals |
| | 2022 | 2 | 1 | 0 | 1 | 3 | 3 | 0 | 3 | - | - | - | - | - | - |

== See also ==
- Soccer in the Australian Capital Territory
- Sport in the Australian Capital Territory
- Soccer in New South Wales
