= 2019 National Premier Leagues =

National Premier Leagues
- Season: 2019
- Champions: Wollongong Wolves (1st title)
- Finalists: Campbelltown City; Canberra Olympic; Devonport City; Heidelberg United; Maitland FC; Lions FC; Perth SC; Wollongong Wolves

The 2019 National Premier Leagues was the seventh season of the Australian National Premier Leagues soccer competition. The league competition was played by eight separate state and territory member federations. The divisions are ACT, NSW, Northern NSW, Queensland, South Australia, Tasmania, Victoria and Western Australia. The winners of each respective divisional league competed in a finals series tournament at season end, culminating in a Grand Final.

Wollongong Wolves were crowned National Premier Leagues Champions and originally qualified directly for the 2020 FFA Cup Round of 32. Since that competition was cancelled, Wollongong Wolves qualified for the 2021 FFA Cup Round of 32.

== League tables ==
=== ACT ===
Pos	Team	Pld	W	D	L	GF	GA	GD	Pts	Qualification or relegation
1	Canberra Olympic	16	12	1	3	48	19	+29	37	2019 National Premier Leagues Finals
2	Tigers FC	16	10	2	4	33	22	+11	32	2019 ACT Finals
3	Gungahlin United (C)	16	11	1	4	48	21	+27	28 (Note: Capital Football docked six points from Gungahlin United, after the club failed to meet payment arrangements for a historic debt.)	2019 ACT Finals
4	Canberra FC	16	8	2	6	39	27	+12	26	2019 ACT Finals
5	Belconnen United	16	7	2	7	29	26	+3	23	
6	Tuggeranong United	16	7	0	9	22	28	−6	21	
7	Monaro Panthers	16	6	2	8	31	33	−2	20	
8	Woden Weston	16	3	3	10	17	40	−23	12	
9	Riverina Rhinos (R)	16	1	1	14	12	64	−52	4	Relegation to the 2020 NPL ACT 2

Source: sportstg.com
Rules for classification: 1) points; 2) goal difference; 3) number of goals scored.
(C) Champions; (R) Relegated

==== Finals ====
Semi-finals
1	Canberra Olympic	0
2	Tigers FC	1
3	Gungahlin United	5
4	Canberra FC	2

Preliminary Final
1	Canberra Olympic	1
3	Gungahlin United	2

Grand Final
2	Tigers FC	0
3	Gungahlin United	5

=== NSW ===
Pos	Team	Pld	W	D	L	GF	GA	GD	Pts	Qualification or relegation
1	Wollongong Wolves	22	16	3	3	52	17	+35	51	2019 National Premier Leagues Finals
2	APIA Leichhardt Tigers (C)	22	12	6	4	42	28	+14	42	2019 NSW Finals
3	Blacktown City	22	11	5	6	31	24	+7	38	2019 NSW Finals
4	Sydney United 58	22	9	6	7	31	32	−1	33	2019 NSW Finals
5	Marconi Stallions	22	10	2	10	42	30	+12	32	2019 NSW Finals
6	Sydney Olympic	22	9	5	8	35	33	+2	32	
7	Mt Druitt Town Rangers	22	8	6	8	43	46	−3	30	
8	Sutherland Sharks	22	7	7	8	36	33	+3	28	
9	Manly United	22	7	5	10	25	34	−9	26	
10	Rockdale City Suns	22	8	2	12	28	44	−16	26	
11	Sydney FC Youth	22	6	3	13	33	52	−19	21	
12	Hakoah Sydney City East (R)	22	3	2	17	12	37	−25	11	Relegation to the 2020 NPL NSW 2 (Note: Relegation based on Club Championship and including points from U20 and U18 teams.)

Source: sportstg.com
Rules for classification: 1) points; 2) goal difference; 3) number of goals scored.
(C) Champions; (R) Relegated

==== Finals ====
Qualifying final
2	APIA Leichhardt Tigers (p)	1 (5)
3	Blacktown City	1 (3)
4	Sydney United 58 (a.e.t.)	2
5	Marconi Stallions	0

Major semi-final
1	Wollongong Wolves	0
2	APIA Leichhardt Tigers	1
Minor semi-final
3	Blacktown City	3
4	Sydney United 58 (a.e.t.)	7

Preliminary final
1	Wollongong Wolves	1
4	Sydney United 58	2

Grand final
2	APIA Leichhardt Tigers (a.e.t.)	2
4	Sydney United 58	1

=== Northern NSW ===
Pos	Team	Pld	W	D	L	GF	GA	GD	Pts	Qualification or relegation
1	Maitland FC	20	13	4	3	44	27	+17	43	2019 National Premier Leagues Finals
2	Lambton Jaffas	20	11	5	4	39	18	+21	38	2019 Northern NSW Finals
3	Edgeworth Eagles (C)	20	12	2	6	44	24	+20	38	2019 Northern NSW Finals
4	Broadmeadow Magic	20	11	5	4	46	29	+17	38	2019 Northern NSW Finals
5	Weston Bears	20	11	4	5	44	33	+11	37	
6	Charlestown City Blues	20	11	3	6	35	24	+11	36	
7	Hamilton Olympic	20	7	4	9	33	32	+1	25	
8	Newcastle Jets Youth	20	6	3	11	29	41	−12	21	Transferred to 2020 NSW NPL 4 / 2020 NSW NPL 2
9	Lake Macquarie City	20	3	3	14	23	54	−31	12	
10	Valentine FC	20	3	3	14	28	60	−32	12	
11	Adamstown Rosebud	20	3	2	15	20	43	−23	11	

Source: sportstg.com
Rules for classification: 1) points; 2) goal difference; 3) number of goals scored.
(C) Champions

==== Finals ====
Semi-finals
1	Maitland FC (a)	2	1	3
4	Broadmeadow Magic	2	1	3
2	Lambton Jaffas	1	0	1
3	Edgeworth Eagles	4	1	5

Grand Final
1	Maitland FC	0
3	Edgeworth Eagles	2

=== Queensland ===
Pos	Team	Pld	W	D	L	GF	GA	GD	Pts	Qualification or relegation
1	Lions FC	28	24	2	2	89	20	+69	74	2019 National Premier Leagues Finals
2	Gold Coast Knights (C)	28	22	4	2	77	22	+55	70	2019 Queensland Finals
3	Peninsula Power	28	23	0	5	84	37	+47	69	2019 Queensland Finals
4	Olympic FC	28	18	3	7	85	43	+42	57	2019 Queensland Finals
5	Brisbane Strikers	28	14	4	10	79	50	+29	46	
6	Brisbane City	28	12	3	13	61	56	+5	39	
7	Gold Coast United	28	11	4	13	45	51	−6	37	
8	Brisbane Roar Youth	28	11	3	14	62	58	+4	36	
9	Eastern Suburbs	28	11	3	14	67	66	+1	36	
10	Redlands United	28	11	2	15	47	72	−25	35	
11	Moreton Bay United	28	10	4	14	47	51	−4	34	
12	Magpies Crusaders United	28	7	5	16	43	104	−61	26	
13	Western Pride (R)	28	8	1	19	37	70	−33	25	Relegation to the 2020 Queensland Premier League
14	South West Queensland Thunder (R)	28	5	3	20	50	104	−54	18	Relegation to the 2020 Queensland Premier League
15	Sunshine Coast (R)	28	2	1	25	25	94	−69	7	Relegation to the 2020 Queensland Premier League

Source: sportstg.com
Rules for classification: 1) points; 2) goal difference; 3) number of goals scored.
(C) Champions; (R) Relegated

==== Finals ====
Semi-finals
2	Gold Coast Knights	2
3	Peninsula Power	1
1	Lions FC	1
4	Olympic FC	2

Grand Final
2	Gold Coast Knights	2
4	Olympic FC	1

=== South Australia ===
Pos	Team	Pld	W	D	L	GF	GA	GD	Pts	Qualification or relegation
1	Campbelltown City (C)	22	13	4	5	51	32	+19	43	Qualification for National Premier Leagues Finals
2	Adelaide Comets	22	11	5	6	43	26	+17	38	Qualification for Finals
3	Adelaide Raiders	22	11	3	8	44	35	+9	36	Qualification for Finals
4	Adelaide Olympic	22	9	8	5	39	32	+7	35	Qualification for Finals
5	Adelaide Blue Eagles	22	10	5	7	33	33	0	35	Qualification for Finals
6	North Eastern MetroStars	22	10	4	8	46	31	+15	34	Qualification for Finals
7	Croydon Kings	22	8	9	5	33	25	+8	33	
8	Adelaide United Youth (Note: Adelaide United Youth cannot qualify for the National Premier Leagues finals series.)	22	8	6	8	38	33	+5	30	
9	Para Hills Knights	22	7	7	8	31	34	−3	28	
10	Adelaide City	22	5	9	8	29	42	−13	18 (Note: Following a sanction by the independent Disciplinary Committee, Adelaide City had 18 competition points removed for the 2018 season, and a further 6 points for the 2019 season.)	
11	West Adelaide (R)	22	3	7	12	25	48	−23	16	Relegation to SA State League 1
12	South Adelaide (R)	22	1	5	16	24	65	−41	8	Relegation to SA State League 1

Source: mygameday
Rules for classification: 1) points; 2) goal difference; 3) number of goals scored.
(C) Champions; (R) Relegated

==== Finals ====
Elimination finals
3	Adelaide Raiders	0
6	North Eastern MetroStars	4
4	Adelaide Olympic	2
5	Adelaide Blue Eagles	0

Semifinals
1	Campbelltown City	0
2	Adelaide Comets	1
Adelaide Olympic	1
North Eastern MetroStars	2

Preliminary final
Adelaide Comets	4
North Eastern MetroStars	0

Grand final
Campbelltown City	3
Adelaide Comets	0

=== Tasmania ===
Pos	Team	Pld	W	D	L	GF	GA	GD	Pts	Qualification or relegation
1	Devonport City (C)	24	20	2	2	91	23	+68	62	2019 National Premier Leagues Finals
2	Olympia Warriors	24	18	2	4	80	31	+49	56	
3	South Hobart	24	14	5	5	80	30	+50	47	
4	Hobart Zebras	24	12	6	6	74	36	+38	42	Merged with Clarence United at the end of the season
5	Glenorchy Knights	24	10	2	12	58	45	+13	32	
6	Kingborough Lions United	24	9	3	12	43	50	−7	30	
7	Launceston City	24	7	4	13	38	51	−13	25	
8	Riverside Olympic	24	4	2	18	26	72	−46	14	
9	Clarence United	24	1	0	23	8	160	−152	3	Merged with Hobart Zebras at the end of the season

Source: GameDay and BetExplorer
Rules for classification: 1) Points; 2) Goal difference; 3) Goals scored
(C) Champions

=== Victoria ===
Pos	Team	Pld	W	D	L	GF	GA	GD	Pts	Qualification or relegation
1	Heidelberg United	26	17	4	5	53	28	+25	55	2019 National Premier Leagues Finals
2	Oakleigh Cannons	26	13	6	7	45	32	+13	45	2019 Victorian Finals
3	Green Gully	26	12	8	6	55	40	+15	44	2019 Victorian Finals
4	Bentleigh Greens (C)	26	13	4	9	47	45	+2	43	2019 Victorian Finals
5	Hume City	26	12	5	9	41	37	+4	41	2019 Victorian Finals
6	Avondale FC	26	16	5	5	63	29	+34	35 (Note: Avondale FC had eighteen points deducted for licence breaches in the 2018 and 2019 seasons.)	2019 Victorian Finals
7	Dandenong City	26	10	5	11	42	47	−5	35	
8	South Melbourne	26	10	4	12	27	42	−15	34	
9	Port Melbourne	26	8	7	11	41	37	+4	31	
10	Melbourne Knights	26	10	4	12	35	42	−7	31 (Note: Melbourne Knights had three points deducted for misconduct in the 2019 season.)	
11	Altona Magic	26	9	2	15	43	51	−8	29	
12	Dandenong Thunder	26	6	6	14	44	70	−26	24	2019 relegation play-offs
13	Kingston City (R)	26	6	5	15	35	51	−16	23	Relegation to the 2020 NPL Victoria 2
14	Pascoe Vale (R)	26	6	3	17	33	53	−20	21	Relegation to the 2020 NPL Victoria 2

Source: sportstg.com
Rules for classification: 1) points; 2) goal difference; 3) number of goals scored.
(C) Champions; (R) Relegated

==== Finals ====
Elimination Finals
3	Oakleigh Cannons	2
6	Hume City	0
4	Green Gully	0
5	Bentleigh Greens	1

Semi-finals
2	Avondale FC	2
3	Oakleigh Cannons	0
1	Heidelberg United	1
5	Bentleigh Greens	2

Final
2	Avondale FC	1 (3)
5	Bentleigh Greens (p)	1 (4)

=== Western Australia ===
Pos	Team	Pld	W	D	L	GF	GA	GD	Pts	Qualification or relegation
1	Perth SC (C)	22	15	4	3	53	21	+32	49	2019 National Premier Leagues Finals
2	Inglewood United	22	11	5	6	38	36	+2	38	2019 WA Top Four Cup
3	Floreat Athena	22	11	4	7	48	37	+11	37	2019 WA Top Four Cup
4	Balcatta	22	9	6	7	26	26	0	33	2019 WA Top Four Cup
5	Bayswater City	22	9	5	8	45	29	+16	32	
6	Sorrento	22	9	4	9	40	41	−1	31	
7	Cockburn City	22	8	4	10	38	38	0	28	
8	Perth Glory Youth	22	7	5	10	35	39	−4	26	
9	Rockingham City	22	8	2	12	37	49	−12	26	
10	Armadale	22	7	4	11	35	45	−10	25	
11	ECU Joondalup	22	4	11	7	24	32	−8	23	
12	Stirling Lions (R)	22	5	4	13	16	42	−26	19	Relegation to the 2020 WA State League 1

Source: sportstg.com
Rules for classification: 1) points; 2) goal difference; 3) number of goals scored.
(C) Champions; (R) Relegated

==== Finals ====
Semi-finals
1	Perth SC	1
2	Inglewood United	3
3	Floreat Athena	3
4	Balcatta	2

Preliminary Final
1	Perth SC (a.e.t.)	2
3	Floreat Athena	1

Grand Final
2	Inglewood United	1
1	Perth SC	2

== Final Series ==
The winner of each league competition (top of the table) in the NPL competed in a single match knockout tournament to decide the National Premier Leagues Champion for 2019. Home advantage for the semi-finals and final was based on a formula relating to time of winning (normal time, extra time or penalties), goals scored and allowed, and yellow/red cards. In addition, the winner will qualify for the 2020 FFA Cup Round of 32.

Club	Qualified From	Participation
Canberra Olympic	(Australian Capital Territory) ACT	3rd
Wollongong Wolves	(New South Wales) NSW	1st
Maitland FC	(New South Wales) Northern NSW	1st
Lions FC	Queensland	2nd
Campbelltown City	South Australia	2nd
Devonport City	Tasmania	2nd
Heidelberg United	(Victoria (state)) Victoria	3rd
Perth SC	Western Australia	3rd

Quarter-finals
(New South Wales) Wollongong Wolves	5
(Australian Capital Territory) Canberra Olympic	1
(Victoria (state)) Heidelberg United	2
(Western Australia) Perth SC (a.e.t.)	3
(New South Wales) Maitland FC	3
(Tasmania) Devonport City	2
(Queensland) Lions FC	2
(South Australia) Campbelltown City	1

Semi-finals
(New South Wales) Wollongong Wolves	2
(Western Australia) Perth SC	0
(New South Wales) Maitland FC	0
(Queensland) Lions FC	2

Grand Final
(New South Wales) Wollongong Wolves (a.e.t.)	4
(Queensland) Lions FC	3

=== Quarter-finals ===
21 September 2019
13:00 AEST

Maitland FC (New South Wales)	3–2	(Tasmania) Devonport City
Thompson 13' (pen.), 22' (pen.); Pratt 71'	Report	Barnard 25'; Bidwell 86'

Cooks Square Park, Maitland
Attendance: 352
Referee: Andrew Higgins

21 September 2019
15:00 AEST

Wollongong Wolves (New South Wales)	5–1	(Australian Capital Territory) Canberra Olympic
Scott 36'; James 42' (pen.); J. Stojcevski 49'; Littler 53'; Dimoski 88'	Report	Popovich 60'

Albert Butler Memorial Park, Wollongong
Attendance: 320
Referee: Adrian Arndt

22 September 2019
13:00 AEST

Lions FC (Queensland)	2–1	(South Australia) Campbelltown City
Hore 64'; Duckworth 69'	Report	Mullen 76'

Lions Stadium, Brisbane
Attendance: 722
Referee: Matthew Skinner

22 September 2019
16:30 AEST

Heidelberg United (Victoria (state))	2–3 (a.e.t.)	(Western Australia) Perth SC
Cartanos 60'; Schiavo 120+1'	Report	Zimarino 7'; Jovic 103'; Domfeh 108'

JL Murphy Reserve, Port Melbourne
Attendance: 403
Referee: Michael Mammis

=== Semi-finals ===
28 September 2019
14:30 AEST

Maitland FC (New South Wales)	0–2	(Queensland) Lions FC
	Report	Jarrard 39'; Hore 68'

Cooks Square Park, Maitland
Attendance: 273
Referee: Stephen Laurie

29 September 2019
14:30 AEST

Wollongong Wolves (New South Wales)	2–0	(Western Australia) Perth SC
James 30'; Okada 90+4'	Report

Albert Butler Memorial Park, Wollongong
Attendance: 621
Referee: Craig Fisher

=== Grand Final ===
5 October 2019
14:30 AEST

Wollongong Wolves (New South Wales)	4–3 (a.e.t.)	(Queensland) Lions FC
James 52' (pen.), 116'; Okada 80'; Juach 109'	Report	Carlos 13'; Mádle 84'; Duckworth 119' (pen.)

Albert Butler Memorial Park, Wollongong
Attendance: 1,362
Referee: Stephen Laurie

== Grand Final clubs' stadiums ==
Team	Location	Stadium	Capacity
Wollongong Wolves	Wollongong	Albert Butler Memorial Park	4,000
Queensland Lions FC	Brisbane	Lions Stadium	5,000
