= 1926 in Australian soccer =

The 1926 season was the 43rd season of regional competitive soccer in Australia.

== League competitions ==
Federation	Competition	Grand Final			Regular Season		
Federation	Competition	Winners	Score	Runners-up	Winners	Runners-up	Third place
Federal Capital Territory Soccer Football Association	FCTSA League	Burns	3–0	Canberra	Burns	Molonglo	Capitol Hill
Northern District British Football Association	Northern NSW Football League	Cessnock	1–0	West Wallsend	West Wallsend	Adamstown Rosebud	Cessnock
Australian Soccer Association	Sydney Metropolitan First Division	Gladesville-Ryde	2–0	Granville	Balgownie	Granville	Corrimal
Queensland British Football Association	Brisbane Area League	Not played			Blackstone Rovers	Thistle	Bundamba Rangers
South Australian British Football Association	South Australian Metropolitan League	Not played			Port Adelaide	Sturt	West Torrens
Tasmanian Soccer Association	Tasmanian Division One	Patons and Baldwins	2–1	South Hobart	North: Patons and Baldwins; South: South Hobart	South: Hobart Athletic	South: Sandy Bay
Anglo-Australian Football Association	Victorian League Division One	Not played			Footscray Thistle	Preston	St Kilda
Western Australian Soccer Football Association	Western Australian Division One	Not played			Fremantle Caledonian	Northern Casuals	Victoria Park

== Cup competitions ==
Federation	Competition	Winners	Runners-up	Venue	Result
Northern District British Football Association	Ellis Cup	West Wallsend	Cessnock	–	2–1
New South Wales British Football Association	Gardiner Challenge Cup	West Wallsend (6/4)	Adamstown Rosebud (2/1)	–	2–1
South Australian British Football Association	South Australian Federation Cup	Port Adelaide (1/0)	Sturt (0/1)	–	2–1
Tasmanian Soccer Association	Tasmanian Division One	Sandy Bay (3/0)	South Hobart (4/3)	–	1–0
Anglo-Australian Football Association	Dockerty Cup	Naval Depot (2/0)	St Kilda (0/3)	–	4–3

(Note: figures in parentheses display the club's competition record as winners/runners-up.)

== See also ==
- Soccer in Australia
