= 1929 Federal Capital Territory Soccer Football Association season =

The 1929 Capital Football season was the fourth Capital Football season. There was only one ACT competition played which was the FCTSA League and was won by Queanbeyan by a 2-point margin.

== 1928 FCTSA League ==
FCTSA League
- Season: 1929
- Dates: 11 May 1929 – 27 July 1929
- Matches played: 0

The 1929 FCTSA League was the fourth season of the FCTSA League, the former top soccer league in the Capital Football. The league was planned to begin on 11 May as some teams withdrew from the competition and the league was not played.

=== Teams ===
- Acton
- Kingston
- Queanbeyan
- Thistles

=== League table ===
Pos	Team	Pld	W	D	L	GF	GA	GD	Pts
1	Acton	0	0	0	0	0	0	0	0
2	Kingston	0	0	0	0	0	0	0	0
3	Queanbeyan	0	0	0	0	0	0	0	0
4	Thistles	0	0	0	0	0	0	0	0

Source: Socceraust.co
Rules for classification: 1) Points; 2) Goal difference; 3) Goals scored

=== Results ===
Home \ Away	ACT	KIN	QUE	THI	ACT	KIN	QUE	THI
Acton	—	—	—	—	—	—	—	—
Kingston	—	—	—		—	—	—	—
Queanbeyan	—	—	—		—	—	—	—
Thistles	—	—		—	—	—	—	—

Updated to match(es) played on unknown. Source: Socceraust.co
Legend: Blue = home team win; Yellow = draw; Red = away team win.

== 1929 Canberra Cup ==
1929 Canberra Cup
Tournament details
- Country: Australia
- Dates: 13 July 1929 – 7 September 1929
- Teams: 2

Final positions
- Champions: Queanbeyan

Tournament statistics
- Matches played: 5
- Goals scored: 17 (3.4 per match)

The 1929 FCTSA Cup was the first edition of the Canberra Cup. This was played after the ACT had cancelled the FCTSA League in replace of the Canberra Cup. Queanbeyan won the Final 3–2 against Canberra Rovers.

=== First round ===
13 July 1929	Queanbeyan	1–2	Canberra Rovers
		Report

=== Second round ===
27 July 1929	Canberra Rovers	2–5	Queanbeyan
		Report

=== Third round ===
10 August 1929	Queanbeyan	w/o	Canberra Rovers
		Report

=== Fourth round ===
24 August 1929	Canberra Rovers	w/o	Queanbeyan
		Report

=== Final ===
7 September 1929	Canberra Rovers	2–3	Queanbeyan
		Report
