= 1926 Federal Capital Territory Soccer Football Association season =

The 1926 Capital Football season was the first Capital Football season. Burns FC won their first FCTSA League title in their history by an 8-point margin over Molonglo.

== 1926 FCTSA League ==
FCTSA League
- Season: 1926
- Dates: 15 May 1926 – 4 September 1926
- Matches played: 30
- Goals scored: 56 (1.87 per match)
- Biggest away win: Canberra 0–10 Molonglo (22 May 1926)

The 1926 FCTSA League is the first season of the FCTSA League, the former top Australian professional soccer league in the Capital Football.

=== Teams ===
- Burns
- Canberra
- Capitol Hill
- Molonglo
- Northbourne

=== League table ===
Pos	Team	Pld	W	D	L	GF	GA	GD	Pts
1	Burns (C)	12	11	0	1	23	8	+15	22
2	Molonglo	12	7	0	5	14	6	+8	14
3	Capitol Hill	12	6	1	5	12	16	−4	13
4	Northbourne	12	3	0	9	7	12	−5	6
5	Canberra	12	2	1	9	0	14	−14	5

Source: Socceraust.co
Rules for classification: 1) Points; 2) Goal difference; 3) Goals scored
(C) Champions

=== Results ===
Home \ Away	BUR	CAN	CAP	MOL	NOR	BUR	CAN	CAP	MOL	NOR
Burns	—	—	—	0–2	—	—	—	—	—	—
Canberra	—	—	0–4	0–10	—	—	—	—	—	—
Capitol Hill	2–4	0–0	—	—	0–2	1–6	—	—	—	—
Molonglo	2–6	—	—	—	—	—	—	—	—	—
Northbourne	1–7	—	4–5	—	—	—	—	—	—	—

Updated to match(es) played on 4 September 1926. Source: Socceraust.co
Legend: Blue = home team win; Yellow = draw; Red = away team win.

== 1926 FCTSA Cup ==
1926 FCTSA Cup
Tournament details
- Country: Australia
- Dates: 14 August 1926 – 18 September 1926
- Teams: 6

Final positions
- Champions: Burns

Tournament statistics
- Matches played: 5

The 1926 FCTSA Cup was the first edition of the FCTSA Cup.

=== First round ===
14 August 1926	Eastlake	v	Capitol Hill
		Report

14 August 1926	Northbourne	v	Canberra
		Report

=== Semi-finals ===
28 August 1926	Molonglo	1–5	Burns
		Report

28 August 1926	Capitol Hill	4–1	Canberra
		Report

=== Final ===
18 September 1926	Burns	3–0	Capitol Hill
		Report
