= Soccer in the Australian Capital Territory =

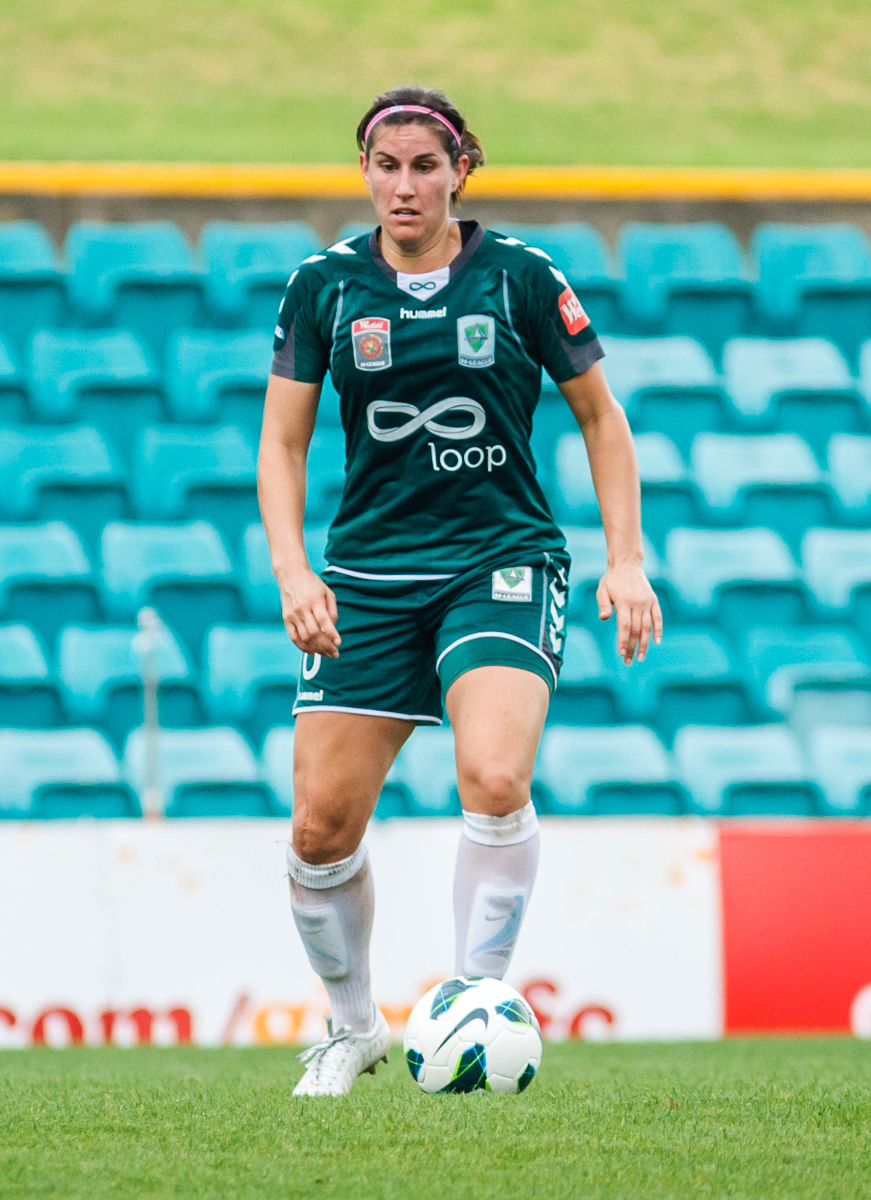
- Caitlin Munoz playing for Canberra United
- Governing body: Capital Football
- First played: 19 August 1910; 116 years ago Ginninderra Showground, Ginninderra
- Registered players: 28,916

Club competitions
- League: National Premier Leagues Capital Football Capital Premier League Capital Football State League; Cups: Capital Football Federation Cup

International competitions
- Kanga Cup

Audience records
- Single match: 20,032 (5 March 2009). 2011 AFC Asian Cup qualification Australia v Kuwait (Bruce Stadium, Canberra)

Soccer in the Australian Capital Territory is predominantly amateur with a local, interstate, national and international history. Soccer in the ACT is organised and administered by Capital Football and involves teams from within the ACT and surrounding NSW regions, Monaro, Southern Tablelands and Riverina.

== Participation ==
Registered players
2019	2023/24
25,905	28,916

== National competition ==
=== Current ===
Canberra United FC (CUFC) compete in the elite national women's competition, the A-League Women (formerly known as the W-League). CUFC was established in 2008 by Capital Football and is one of eight founding members of the league. United is the only A-League Women team not affiliated with an A-League Men team.

Since 2014, Canberra, through Capital Football, has been granted one qualification place for the round of 32 of every FFA Cup annual national tournament. The Capital Football Federation Cup is the qualification process for ACT clubs to qualify for the FFA Cup, with the winner of the Cup qualifying. As of 2018, the following ACT teams have qualified and competed in the FFA Cup:

ACT (Capital Football) FFA Cup all-time record
Representative		Result		Rounds				
Season	Team	Entered	Position	Round of 32	Round of 16	Quarter final	Semi final	Final
2014	Tuggeranong United	Round 32	Round 16	Won 5–4 (South Hobart)	Lost 0–6 (Melbourne Victory)	–	–	–
2015	Gungahlin United	Round 32	Round 32	Lost 0–1 (Sydney Olympic)	–	–	–	–
2016	Canberra Olympic	Round 32	Semi finals	Won 1–0 (Surfers Paradise)	Won 2–0 (Redlands United)	Won 1–0 (Green Gully)	Lost 0–3 (Sydney FC)	–
2017	Canberra Olympic	Round 32	Round 32	Lost 1–0 (Sorrento FC)	–	–	–	–
2018	Canberra FC	Round 32	Round 32	Lost 1–4 (Broadmeadow Magic)	–	–	–	–
2019	Tigers FC	Round 32	Round 32	Lost 0–2 (Hume City)	–	–	–	–

Central Coast Mariners (CCM), in an effort to secure the Canberra region as a catchment for the regional team, but has moved home A-League fixtures away from their normal stadium in Gosford to Bruce Stadium in Canberra in both 2009 and 2016. During the 2009–10 A-League season, CCM played Perth Glory in September and Adelaide United in October at Bruce Stadium in front of crowds ranging from 5,100 and 5,500. In 2016, CCM entered into an agreement with the ACT Government to play Wellington Phoenix and Adelaide United in Canberra during the 2016–17 season. The Phoenix was chosen due to Canberra and Wellington's sister-city partnership. Adelaide United was chosen as they were the defending champions of the A-league at the time. Both matches were coordinated with Canberra's W-League team, Canberra United, to create double header match-day events.

Central Coast Mariners Canberra A-League Matches
Ref	Date	Time (UTC+11)	Home team	Res	Away team	Ground	Attendance
	4 September 2009	20:00	Central Coast Mariners	2–1	Perth Glory	Bruce Stadium	5,193
	31 October 2009	19:00	Central Coast Mariners	0–0	Adelaide United	Bruce Stadium	5,437
	12 November 2016	17:35	Central Coast Mariners	0–2	Wellington Phoenix	Bruce Stadium	5,497
	5 February 2017	17:00	Central Coast Mariners	2–1	Adelaide United	Bruce Stadium	5,072

=== Previous ===
Former NSL clubs
Two Canberra clubs have competed in the now defunct National Soccer League (NSL). Canberra City (then known as Canberra Arrows) competed in the NSL between 1977 and 1986 and Canberra Cosmos between 1995 and 2001. The Queanbeyan based Capital Football affiliated club, Inter Monaro (now known as Monaro Panthers) also competed in the NSL between 1985 and 1986. All three clubs shared limited success in the NSL but the Arrows did attract Australian national team legend Johnny Warren as manager of the club during this period as well as giving then future Socceroo and national team manager Frank Farina his first senior soccer debut. The Cosmos attracted the Australian national team captain at the time, Paul Wade, when they joined the NSL as well as nurturing a number of future Socceroos including Jason Polak, Robbie Hooker, John Markovski, Nik Mrdja, Lindsay Wilson and Vince Grella. The Cosmos were also led by Sport Australia Hall of Famer and former national team manager, Rale Rasic for two seasons.

Former Women's NSL clubs
The Canberra Eclipse competed in the Women's National Soccer League from formation in 1996 till folding in 2004. The team played home matches out of West Belconnen Leagues Club and the AIS in Belconnen. Similar to the other five teams in the national competition, the Eclipse had an alternative name, the ACT Academy of Sports. The Canberra Eclipse won the league in 2001–02, beating NSW Sapphires 1–0 in the grand final. Canberra also finished runner-up in 1998–99 when the Eclipse lost 0–2 to SASI Pirates. Australian internationals, Lisa Casagrande and Caitlin Munoz both won league Golden Boots in 98–99 and 01-02 respectively in Eclipse jerseys. Other Australian internationals to represent the Eclipse include Ellie Brush and Amy Taylor.

Failed A-League4Canberra bid
In July 2008 TransACT CEO, Ivan Slavich, formally established the A-League4Canberra bid organisation along with other key local business identities. The organisations goal was to obtain an A-league licence for the Canberra region. The A-League4Canberra bid officially launched 11 December 2008 at Jerrabomberra Primary School, headed by Ivan Slavich alongside Canberra United player Ellie Brush and Member for Eden-Monaro, Mike Kelly. A-League4Canberra quickly secured ACT Government support for their bid in 2009 with the ACT Labor Government committing $2.5 million towards the bid. Former Canberra-born Australian internationals, Ned Zelic and Carl Valeri signed on to become founding members and spokespeople of the organisation. The bid signed 2000 members, raising $5 million as it gathered capital to meet FFA bid criteria. In 2009 and 2011 Canberra's bid was overlooked by FFA in its initial rounds of league expansion in favour of now defunct North Queensland Fury, Gold Coast United and Sydney Rovers. When the Sydney Rovers bid collapsed the A-League4Canberra organisation again submitted a bid for inclusion in the league, however the FFA again overlooked the bid in favour of establishing its own team in Western Sydney that would become Western Sydney Wanderers. On 10 May 2012, after its failed attempts and FFA's announcement that expansion beyond ten teams was on hold for the foreseeable future, the A-League4Canberra bid organisation's CEO, Heather Reid, announced the organisation would cease efforts to gain an A-league licence for the Canberra region, would wind-up operations and refund founding members monies.

== Local competition ==
Capital Football operates and administers all local competitions in the ACT for senior men and women and junior girls and boys.

=== Junior ===
The ACT breaks its junior structure and league system up into Miniroo (formally Rooball) for early development and junior league soccer for teenagers. The junior elite pathway comes under the banner of the NPL.

- Miniroo is for Under 5/6 to Under 12s age groups, the soccer is non-competitive and focused on player development
- Boys Junior Leagues is for boys between the ages of 13 and 17 years, with division 1–3 in most age groups
- Girls Junior Leagues is for girls between the ages of 13 and 17 years, with divisions 1–2 in most age groups
- NPL elite pathways for both boys and girls in age groups u13, u14, u16 and u18

=== Senior ===
==== History ====
The first senior soccer match played in the ACT was played in 1910 between Ginninderra and Yarralumla. The match was played at the Ginninderra showgrounds and came about because Ginninderra locals wanted to play a different sport from the already established Rugby Union. The visiting Yarralumla team won the match 1–0.

==== League system ====
The ACT senior men's competitions are generally run between April and September each calendar year. The league system is amateur in nature with a few semi-professional exceptions. The system consists of a pyramid of leagues, headed by three single divisions that do not encompass promotion and relegation, instead league licences to compete are granted by Capital Football. However, divisions 1–6 are bound together by the principle of promotion and relegation. The most successful club in each league rises to a higher league, whilst the club that finishes at the bottom of their league finds itself sinking down a level. Division 7–10 are open leagues for casual/social players. All leagues contest a regular season and conclude with a finals series.

The ACT senior women's competitions are generally run parallel to the men's with the competition running between April and September each calendar year. The league system is amateur in nature. The system consists of a pyramid of six leagues that do not encompass promotion and relegation, instead league licences to compete are granted by Capital Football. All leagues contest a regular season and conclude with a finals series.

==== Leagues structure ====
The ACT men's league structure is broken into thirteen league levels, at the top is the single division of National Premier Leagues Capital Football (Level 1, which is often referred to as the “top flight”), containing ten teams, of which, as of 2017, seven are based in Canberra, Australian Capital Territory, with the final three based in the New South Wales towns of Queanbeyan, Cooma and Griffith. One of the teams, FFA Centre of Excellence, is an age restricted youth academy, which is ineligible for the finals series. Below The NPL is the Capital Football State League structure of twelve leagues (Levels 2 to 13). The Capital League (Level 2) and The Capital League Reserves (Level 3) both contain eight teams each. State League Division 1–6 (Level 4–9) are competitive divisions that are restricted to ten teams but may sometimes contain less than ten teams. Divisions 7–10 (Level 10–13) have no limits on competing teams and are open for inclusion submissions.

ACT Men's League Structure
Level	League(s)/Division(s)
1	NPL Capital Football 1; 8 clubs ↓ 1 relegations
2	Capital Premier League; 8 clubs ↑ 1 promotions
3	Division 1; 10 clubs ↓ 1 relegations
4	Division 2; 10 clubs ↑ 1 promotions ↓ 1 relegations
5	Division 3; 10 clubs ↑ 1 promotions ↓ 1 relegations
6	Division 4; 10 clubs ↑ 1 promotions ↓ 1 relegations
7	Division 5; 10 clubs ↑ 1 promotions ↓ 1 relegations
8	Division 6; 10 clubs ↑ 1 promotions
9	Division 7; 14 clubs Open
10	Division 8; 12 clubs Open
11	Division 9; 12 clubs Open
12	Division 10; 12 clubs Open

The ACT women's league structure is broken into six league levels, at the top is the single division of Women's National Premier League Capital Football (Level 1, which is often referred to as the “top flight”), containing eight teams, of which, as of 2017, seven are based in Canberra, ACT and one based in Queanbeyan, NSW. Below the NPL is The ACT State League women's structure. This structure is broken into five leagues, at the top of the system is Division 1 (Level 2, sometimes referred to as Women's Capital League), containing 9 clubs, of which, as of 2016, eight are based in Canberra, Australian Capital Territory and one is based in Goulburn, NSW. Divisions 2 to 5 (Level 3–6) contain between 8 and 10 teams each with thirty-four clubs coming from Canberra and two coming from NSW, Queanbeyan and Yass.

ACT Women's League Structure
Level	League(s)/Division(s)
1	Women's NPL Capital Football; 8 clubs
1	Division 1 (Women's Capital League); 9 clubs
2	Division 2; 10 clubs
3	Division 3; 9 clubs
4	Division 4; 9 clubs
5	Division 5; 8 clubs

==== Cup competition ====
The ACT Federation Cup (Fed Cup) has been in existence since 1962 under various sponsorship names. Currently the cup is named the Capital Football Federation Cup. As of 2016, the Fed Cup uses a nineteen team bracket broken up into five rounds (Round 1, Round 2, quarter-finals, semi-finals, Final). Round 1 consists of six qualifier teams, predominantly State League Division 1 teams, competing in three matches with three teams advancing. Round two sees thirteen clubs enter from the NPL Capital Football and Capital League (Level 1 and 2) and join the three qualified teams. Since 2014, the cup has been used by Capital Football as the qualifying tournament for FFA Cup qualification with the final winner qualifying for the FFA Cup round of 32. The Cup has been awarded every year since 1962 with one exception, 1973. In 1973, the Cup final between Croatia Deakin and Juventus was abandoned by the match officials after twenty minutes with the score locked at nill-nill due to crowd trouble. The match was not replayed and the cup not awarded. The most successful club in the Cup's history is Canberra FC, who under its various different names has lifted the cup seventeen times.

The ACT Women's Federation Cup is run as a pre-season cup competition that is open to all teams of all levels. From 2015, the cup has consisted of a group stage followed by a grand final. Prior to that, it consisted of a group stage with two pools and then a grand final of the two pool winners.

=== Futsal ===
ACT Futsal consists of an elite level women's and men's league (referred to as the Premier League) plus five men's divisions broken into regions, three women's divisions and two mixed divisions. League seasons are run during the spring and summer months with the premier leagues running from September to December each calendar year. All leagues contest a regular season and conclude with a finals series. As of 2017, there are 5,000 registered futsal players in the ACT.

== International events ==
The ACT hosts an annual international youth tournament named the Kanga Cup. The tournament is organised and run by Capital Football and attracts participants from all over the globe. Matches are played at selected ACT playing districts across Canberra over a two-week period in July.

== History of Matches ==
=== 2000 Olympics ===
Canberra's Bruce Stadium was selected as a host venue for men's and women's soccer for the 2000 Sydney Olympics. The ACT hosted five men's and women's group matches at Bruce Stadium between 13 September and 20 September 2000 including the Australian women's national soccer team (the Matildas). Bruce also hosted one of the women's semi-finals on 24 September 2000.

=== 2003 OFC Women's Championship ===
The 2003 OFC Women's Championship was hosted at McKellar Park between 5 and 13 April 2003. Five nations contested the championship including Australia, New Zealand, Papua New Guinea, Samoa and Cook Islands. The championship doubled as the OFC Women's World Cup Qualifying Tournament for the 2003 FIFA Women's World Cup held in the US.

=== 2015 Asian Cup ===
Canberra was selected as one of five host cities for the 2015 Asian Cup Finals. Bruce Stadium was selected as the host venue in Canberra with McKellar Park and Deakin Stadium selection as training venues. Gungahlin Enclosed was selected as a back-up training venue in case one of the other two become unavailable. Iraq, North Korea and Qatar all used Canberra has their tournament base while Kuwait based themselves in Queanbeyan just over the border in NSW. Bruce Stadium played host to six group stage matches and one quarter-final match. One AFC representative labelled the Canberra playing surface as the best of the tournament while tickets sales for Canberra doubled budgeted expectations.

2015 Asian Cup Matches in Canberra
Date	Team #1	Result	Team #2	Attendance
10 January 2015	South Korea	1–0	Oman	12,552
11 January 2015	United Arab Emirates	4–1	Qatar	5,513
13 January 2015	Kuwait	0–1	South Korea	8,795
15 January 2015	Bahrain	1–2	United Arab Emirates	7,925
18 January 2015	China	2–1	North Korea	18,457
20 January 2015	Iraq	2–0	Palestine	10,235
23 January 2015	Iran	3–3 (a.e.t), (6–7p)	Iraq	18,921

=== Australian National Men's Team matches ===
The Australian men's national team (the Socceroos) has played in the ACT five times with the first match in 1996 against Tahiti in the second leg of the 1996 OFC Nations Cup Final. In 2015, off the back of Canberra successful 2015 Asian Cup hosting, the nations capital secured a World Cup qualifier for the first time. The Australian national team played Kyrgyzstan in a 2018 World Cup qualifier in the second round of AFC qualifications. In 2019, it was announced the Australian men's national team would return to Canberra for the first time in four years with another world cup qualifier. Australia would come up against Napal in an AFC 2022 World Cup qualifier.

Australian men's National Team's matches in Canberra
Date	Team #1	Result	Team #2	Event	Ground	Attendance	Ref.
1 November 1996	Australia	5–0	Tahiti	1996 OFC Nations Cup Final	Bruce Stadium	9,421	
5 March 2009	Australia	0–1	Kuwait	2011 Asian Cup Qualifiers	Bruce Stadium	20,032	
7 October 2011	Australia	5–0	Malaysia	International Friendly	Bruce Stadium	10,041	
12 November 2015	Australia	3–0	Kyrgyzstan	2018 FIFA World Cup Qualifiers	Bruce Stadium	19,500	
10 October 2019	Australia	5-0	Nepal	2022 FIFA World Cup Qualifiers	Bruce Stadium	18,563	

=== Australian National Women's Team matches ===
The Australia women's national team (the Matildas) has a long history of playing matches in the ACT. In total the Matildas have played 17 matches in Canberra. The first match against New Zealand was played on 17 March 1995 in an international friendly. The Matildas have been involved in two major FIFA sanctioned tournaments in the ACT. Australia played one group match of the 2000 Olympic Games at Bruce Stadium against Germany. In 2003, McKellar Park played host to the 2003 OFC Women's Championship, Australia went on to win the tournament. In 2019, FFA and the ACT Government announced a deal to bring the Australia women's national team back to Canberra for the first time in six years.

Australian women's National Team's matches in Canberra
Date	Team #1	Result	Team #2	Event	Location
17 March 1995	Australia	4–0	New Zealand	International friendly	Canberra, Australia
19 March 1995	Australia	2–0	New Zealand	International friendly	Canberra, Australia
5 March 1997	Australia	0–3	United States	Ram Sports Cup	Canberra, Australia
23 November 1997	Australia	2–1	China	Tri Nations Series	Canberra, Australia
10 January 1999	Australia	4–3	Canada	Australia Cup	Bruce Stadium, Canberra, Australia
13 January 1999	Australia	1–0	Italy	Australia Cup	Bruce Stadium, Canberra, Australia
31 May 2000	Australia	1–0	Japan	Pacific Cup	Bruce Stadium, Canberra, Australia
13 September 2000	Australia	0–3	Germany	2000 Olympic Games	Bruce Stadium, Canberra, Australia
26 January 2003	Australia	2–0 (Note: Match abandoned after 77' (with result standing) following an incident between a Korean official and an assistant referee)	South Korea	Australia Cup	McKellar Park, Canberra, Australia
29 January 2003	Australia	2–0	Mexico	Australia Cup	McKellar Park, Canberra, Australia
1 February 2003	Australia	1–3	Sweden	Australia Cup	McKellar Park, Canberra, Australia
5 April 2003	Australia	19–0	Samoa	2003 OFC Women's Championship	McKellar Park, Canberra, Australia
7 April 2003	Australia	11–0	Cook Islands	2003 OFC Women's Championship	McKellar Park, Canberra, Australia
9 April 2003	Australia	13–0	Papua New Guinea	2003 OFC Women's Championship	McKellar Park, Canberra, Australia
13 April 2003	Australia	2–0	New Zealand	2003 OFC Women's Championship	McKellar Park, Canberra, Australia
7 February 2009	Australia	1–5	Italy	International friendly	Bruce Stadium, Canberra, Australia
13 June 2013	Australia	1–0	New Zealand	International friendly	AIS Athletics Track, Canberra, Australia

== Interstate competition ==
=== Inter-connection with NSW clubs and competitions ===
During the history of soccer in the ACT there has been frequent inter-connection with NSW. The following points detail this connection history:

- 1924, ACT Scottish community club, Burns Club, established Burns Football Club, which toured around country NSW and Sydney, playing matches over a two-year period.
- 1931, with the Great Depression gripping the ACT and the nation, the Federal Capital Territory Soccer Football Association and its five member clubs ceased competition with the only soccer in the capital territory being played between Canberra and cross-border rivals Queanbeyan.
- 1934, following the collapse of the Federal Monaro District Soccer Association and the soccer league in the ACT, the only club to remain was NSW based Gundaroo (formed 1933). Gundaroo took on the leftover Canberra players and contested matches against Goulburn and Marulan.
- End of the 1940s, World War II stopped all but travelling serviceman soccer matches in the ACT until a team called Wanderers was formed and contested matches in Goulburn and Sydney. The team attracted strong crowds and was the catalyst for re-developing the game in Canberra.
- 1950's, new Canberra based clubs started to be established on the back of new post-war migrant communities in the ACT, by 1954 these clubs including Roma, Olympic, Hungaria and Croatia were attracting strong crowds of 2,000 people and were also competing in the Sydney-based Robertson Cup.
- 1960's, the newly established ACT Soccer Association looked to expand the ACT soccer league by inviting NSW sides from surrounding Wagga, Griffith and Queanbeyan (Inter Monaro and Makedonia) regions.
- 1978, ACT Premier League club, Inter Monaro, then ACT champions and premieres, switched from the ACT Premier League to NSW. The Queanbeyan-based club competed in the NSW top flight between 1978 and 1985 and again between 1987 and 1990 with a two-year gap in the middle spent in the NSL. Monaro won the NSW Division One premiership in 1984 and the finals series championship in 1979.
- 1987, after losing its NSL spot post the restructure, Canberra City rebranded as Canberra City Griffins and spent one season in the NSW Premier League where it finished runner-up in the league to Wollongong City by two points while the club also lost the finals series grand final to the same opposition 1–2. Canberra City then withdrew from the league and moved to the ACT Premier League from 1988 onward.
- 1988, Croatia Deakin left the ACT Premier League to compete in the NSW Premier League under the name Canberra Croatia. Canberra Croatia would compete in the NSW Premier League for seven years before returning to the ACT Premier League in 1995. During this time Canberra Croatia won the Waratah Cup in 1990, lost the cup final in 1992, finished league runner-up in 1989 and 1990 and lost three consecutive league grand-finals between 1989 and 1991.
- 2000, Belconnen United switched to the NSW Premier League from the ACT Premier League and the club was renamed Belconnen Blue Devils. Belconnen competed in NSW for five seasons. The Blue Devils enjoyed success in NSW, claiming the league premiership in 2003–04 and the challenger league winners’ medal in 2004–05. A dispute with the management of Football NSW in 2006 saw the club's licence revoked and the club return to the ACT Premier League.
- Currently, Capital Football has eight NSW based member clubs from the Monaro, Southern Tablelands and Riverina regions. The latest of these, Griffith based Riverina Rhinos, joined the NPL Capital Football in 2017.

=== Sydney FC A-League Pre-Season Cup matches in Canberra ===
During the 2006–07 and 2007–08 A-League seasons, Sydney FC played two Pre-Season Cup matches at Bruce Stadium in Canberra.

Sydney FC's Canberra Pre-Season Cup Matches
Date	Home team	Res	Away team	Ground	Attendance
22 July 2006	Sydney FC	2–1	Newcastle United Jets	Bruce Stadium	7,226
29 July 2007	Sydney FC	0–3	Central Coast Mariners	Bruce Stadium	5,735

=== A-league club friendlies in Canberra ===
Since the A-League inception in 2005 a number of interstate A-League teams have travelled to Canberra to conduct training camps, youth coaching clinics and play pre-season trial matches against local ACT clubs and representative teams. A-League teams to have travelled to Canberra include Sydney FC, Central Coast Mariners, Newcastle United Jets and Western Sydney Wanderers. ACT clubs to compete in these interstate friendlies include Belconnen United, Canberra FC, Gungahlin United and Canberra Olympic.

A-League Pre-Season Matches in Canberra
Year	Home team	Result	Away team	Ground	Ref.
2005	Belconnen United	0–1	Sydney FC	McKellar Park	
2007	Belconnen United	0–4	Central Coast Mariners	McKellar Park	
2008	ACT Rockets	0–4	Central Coast Mariners	Deakin Stadium	
2008	Belconnen United	1–2	Central Coast Mariners	McKellar Park	
2009	Belconnen United	0–3	Central Coast Mariners	McKellar Park	
2010	Canberra FC	0–4	Central Coast Mariners	Deakin Stadium	
2010	Belconnen United	1–4	Central Coast Mariners	McKellar Park	
2011	Canberra FC	1–2	Central Coast Mariners	Deakin Stadium	
2011	Belconnen United	0–5	Central Coast Mariners	McKellar Park	
2012	Canberra Rockets	1–9	Newcastle United Jets	McKellar Park	
2013	ACT NPL All-Stars	0–3	Newcastle United Jets	McKellar Park	
2013	Canberra Olympic	1–3	Western Sydney Wanderers	AIS Athletics Track	
2014	Canberra FC	0–1	Western Sydney Wanderers	Deakin Stadium	
2014	Canberra FC	0–5	Sydney FC	Deakin Stadium	
2015	Belconnen United	0–3	Sydney FC	McKellar Park	
2015	Canberra FC	0–3	Western Sydney Wanderers	Deakin Stadium	
2015	Canberra Olympic	2–3	Central Coast Mariners	Gungahlin Enclosed Oval	
2015	Gungahlin United	1–3	Central Coast Mariners	Gungahlin Enclosed Oval	
2016	Canberra FC	1–4	Western Sydney Wanderers	Deakin Stadium	
2016	Capital North Region Select	2–2	Central Coast Mariners	Woden Park	
2016	Capital South Region Select	0–4	Central Coast Mariners	Woden Park	
2017	Canberra Olympic	0–5	Newcastle United Jets	Deakin Stadium	

=== ACT interstate A-League partnerships ===
In 2007, Belconnen United signed a mutual benefiting relationship agreement with A-League club Central Coast Mariners. The two clubs agreed to play an annual pre-season friendly match in Canberra at McKellar Park named The Bank of Queensland Cup. The agreement opened up opportunities for a development pathway for ACT talent to the A-League while the Mariners gained a foothold within the ACT soccer community. The agreement lasted five years with annual matches played between 2007 and 2011, starting with a 4–0 victory to the visiting Mariners on 30 June 2007.

On 10 April 2015, Belconnen United announced they had formed a formal relationship with A-League heavyweights Sydney FC. The agreement between the two clubs established a formal pathway for Belconnen youngsters to progress and gain the possibility of an A-League contract with Sydney FC. The agreement also opened up ongoing opportunities for Belconnen coaching staff to work with and information share with Sydney FC staff including Graham Arnold. Finally, Sydney FC agreed to tour Canberra in 2015 pre-season to host coaching clinics and play a friendly match against the Blue Devils. Belconnen lost the friendly match against Sydney 0–3 with second half goals to Andrew Hoole, Jacob Tratt and Matt Simon in front of 1,852 fans.

=== ACT interstate NPL partnerships ===
On 2 January 2017, Belconnen United entered into a mutual benefiting agreement with NSW NPL club Wollongong Wolves to co-host a "festival of football" in the South Coast town of Nowra. From 28 to 29 January 2017, the two clubs played a number of women's and men's junior and senior exhibition matches, ran free all-ages coaching and refereeing clinics, training drills, player sessions and family activities at Nowra's Ison Park.

== Academies ==
FFA Centre of Excellence (formally Australian Institute of Sport Football Program) – Established in 1981 as one of the eight founding programs at the Australian Institute of Sport. The FFA Centre of Excellence (FFA COE) is run by the national federation of Australia and is based in Bruce, Australian Capital Territory. Funding for the program is provided by the federal Australian Sports Commission. 20 students from all over Australia between the ages 14 and 17 are selected for a 12-month study and development program, with the option of a second year. The FFA COE fields their squad in the top division of men's football in the ACT, NPL Capital Football but is ineligible for the Federation Cup and league finals series. The program has previously competed in the NSW and Victorian Premier Leagues and has produced a host of Australian international players.

Canberra United Academy (CUA) – Established on 15 December 2015 by Capital Football, the CUA was an amalgamation of Capital Football's various elite high performance soccer programs into one entity. CUA is the elite academy for both boys and girls from the ACT and surrounding regions between the ages of 10 and 17. In 2016 the academy fielded their boys squad in the NPL Capital Football but its inclusion was controversial with ACT NPL clubs threatening to form their own breakaway league or boycotting matches at one stage before negotiations with Capital Football avoided that scenario and a compromise was reached for 2017 onwards that would see the boys CUA merge with the FFA COE, with two players selected from CUA to be included in the FFA COE squad. CUA has fielded their girls program in the Women's National Premier League Capital Football since 2016 onwards.

Talent Support Program (TSP), Which is now the Talent Development Scheme (TDS) is the official academy run by Capital football for elite NPL Footballers aged 14-16, The Academy is the pathway for the national youth championships the TDS is run by Phil Booth and Coaches Marcial Munoz, Pete Carbone, Brad Oliviera, Ian Worthington and Grant Barlow, the academy training is held at the Hawker football centre. The Squads are Below for 2024.

U14s: Jacob Hately, Andreas Kaskoutas, Adam Przydacz, Joshua Lopilato, Cooper Wykes, Jacob Pratezina, Cooper San Juan, Logan Volkert, Antun Celebija, Filip Jovcic, Cameron Walsh, Oliver Juric, Orion Henry, Christian Inacio, Calvin Habtemarian, Max Agbonzilko, and Dylan Bates.

U15s: (Coached by Ian Worthington) Zac Harri, Lachlan Forno, Sebastian Paragalli, Cristiano Subasic, Antonio Carbone, Daniel Turcic, Tomislav Celebija, Lemar Katawazai, Isaac Waldren, Max Naunton, Toby Mcphearson, Marc Papandrea, Jonah Briggs, Cooper Minion, Anas Elsergany, Sebastian Peric, Ashton Stojceski, Anthony Grgic, Esmail Zahir, Mohammad Zahir, Brooklyn Montana, Ewan Bellairs and Nicholas Baird

U16s (Coached by Marcial Munoz) Sebastian Czoban, Nikola Celebija, Flynn Mcdonald-wilson, Marcus Lau, Zac Colson, Rory Dalhlerup, Thomas Blazevski, Charlie Rae, Valentino Ison, Sebastian Munoz, Rico Beltrami, Luka Jukic, Dario Turcic, Michael Pratezina, Seth Bonnett, Xavi Bonnett, Freddie Kushnick, Anthony Rakic, Andy Rakic, Jye Wilkes, Carter Connell, Dallas Santalucia, Cadel Zwangobani, Kris Raad, Kristijan Aleksic, Michael Lo Pilato and Josip Jukic.

Motivate Football Academy Australia (MFAA) – Established 2013, the MFAA is a private academy based in Canberra. The academy focuses in individual skills, technique and confidence not game tactics and formations.

== ACT soccer association names ==
ACT Football Associations/Federations
#	Name	From	To
1	The Central Southern District British Football Association	April 1914	July 1914
2	Federal Capital Territory Soccer Football Association	1926	1930
3	Federal Monaro District Soccer Association	1932	1934
4	ACT Soccer Association (under the name Soccer Canberra)	1960	2005
5	ACT Football Federation (under the name Capital Football)	2005	Current

== Stadiums and grounds ==
Bruce	McKellar	Deakin	Gungahlin	Phillip	Wanniassa	Acton
Canberra Stadium	McKellar Park	Deakin Stadium	Gungahlin Enclosed Oval	Woden Park	Viking Park	ANU Willows
Capacity: 25,011	Capacity: 3,500	Capacity: 1,500	Capacity: 1,150	Capacity: 1,000	Capacity: 8,000	Capacity: 200
Soccer, Rugby league, Rugby union	Soccer	Soccer	Soccer	Soccer, Athletics	Rugby union, Soccer	Soccer

== Representative ==
ACT representative teams often compete at national junior level competitions and tournaments. ACT representative teams play in yellow, blue and white colours, representing the colours of the ACT found on the Territory's flag. Since 2008 there have been a number of different incarnations of an ACT top flight select XI who has played visiting teams, predominantly visiting A-League teams. This select XI has been named ACT Rockets, Canberra Rockets, Capital Football Select, ACT NPL All-Stars and Capital North/South Region Select. These teams have versed Central Coast Mariners (2008, 2009, 2016) and Newcastle United Jets (2012, 2013) at ACT venues including the Australian Institute of Sport, McKellar Park, Deakin Stadium and Woden Park.

ACT Representative colours	Capital Football colours

== See also ==
- Sport in the Australian Capital Territory
