= 2018 Capital Football season =

(Australian Capital Territory) Capital Football
- Season: 2018
- Champions: Canberra FC
- Cup Winners: Canberra FC
- Premiers: Canberra FC

The 2018 Capital Football season was the sixth season under the new competition format in the Australian Capital Territory. The league premier for the new structure qualifies for the National Premier Leagues finals series, competing with the other state federation premiers in a final knockout tournament to decide the National Premier Leagues Champion for 2018.

== League Tables ==
=== 2018 National Premier League ACT ===
(Australian Capital Territory) NPL Capital Football
- Season: 2018
- Champions: Canberra FC
- Premiers: Canberra FC
- Matches: 72
- Goals: 279 (3.88 per match)
- Top goalscorer: Nicolas Villafane; Thomas James (19 goals)
- Biggest home win: 7–0; Canberra Olympic vs Tigers FC; 15 August 2018
- Biggest away win: 0–7; Riverina Rhinos vs Tigers FC; 12 May 2018
- Highest scoring: 7–2; Canberra FC vs Tigers FC; 6 May 2018

The 2018 National Premier League ACT season was played over 18 rounds from March to August 2018. The league ran with nine teams after the FFA cut funding to the FFA Centre of Excellence, which wound up following the conclusion of the 2017 season.

Pos	Team	Pld	W	D	L	GF	GA	GD	Pts	Qualification or relegation
1	Canberra (C)	16	12	2	2	46	13	+33	38	2018 National Premier Leagues Finals
2	Canberra Olympic	16	11	0	5	40	21	+19	33	2018 ACT Finals
3	Tigers FC	16	9	1	6	41	38	+3	28	2018 ACT Finals
4	Tuggeranong United	16	8	2	6	32	32	0	26	2018 ACT Finals
5	Belconnen United	16	7	3	6	30	29	+1	24	
6	Woden-Weston	16	4	6	6	32	36	−4	18	
7	Gungahlin United	16	4	4	8	21	25	−4	16	
8	Riverina Rhinos	16	5	1	10	20	39	−19	16	
9	Monaro Panthers	16	1	3	12	17	46	−29	6	

Source: sportstg.com
Rules for classification: 1) points; 2) goal difference; 3) number of goals scored.
(C) Champions

==== Finals ====
Semi-finals
1	Canberra FC	3
2	Canberra Olympic	5
3	Tigers FC (pen.)	2 (3)
4	Tuggeranong United	2 (2)

Preliminary Final
1	Canberra FC	5
3	Tigers FC	0

Grand Final
2	Canberra Olympic	1
1	Canberra FC	2

==== Top Scorers ====
Rank	Player	Club	Goals
1	(Argentina) Nicolas Villafane	Tigers FC	19
2	(England) Thomas James	Canberra FC	19
3	(Australia) Michael John	Canberra Olympic	12
4	(Nigeria) Olaide Yinka-Kehinde	Woden-Weston FC	12
5	(Australia) Aisosa Ihegie	Tuggeranong United	10
6	(Australia) Mark Shields	Tigers FC	9
7	(Australia) Daniel Barac	Belconnen United	8
8	(Australia) Samuel Smith	Monaro Panthers	8
9	(Australia) Domenic Giampaolo	Canberra Olympic	6
10	(Australia) Kofi Danning	Canberra FC	6

=== 2018 ACT Capital League ===
(Australian Capital Territory) Capital League
- Season: 2018
- Champions: ANU FC
- Premiers: Queanbeyan City
- Matches: 90
- Goals: 370 (4.11 per match)
- Top goalscorer: Andrew Sellers (22 goals)
- Biggest home win: 12–2; ANU FC vs Southern Tablelands; 8 April 2018
- Biggest away win: 0–11; Monaro Panthers vs Weston Molonglo; 30 June 2018
- Highest scoring: 14 goals (see biggest home win)

The 2018 ACT Capital League is the sixth edition of the Capital League as the second level domestic association football competition in the ACT. There were 18 rounds in total with five matches contested per round. The season started on 7 April 2018 and ran until 12 August 2018.

Pos	Team	Pld	W	D	L	GF	GA	GD	Pts	Qualification or relegation
1	Queanbeyan City	18	12	3	3	38	17	+21	39	2018 ACT Capital League Finals
2	White Eagles	18	12	2	4	52	24	+28	38	2018 ACT Capital League Finals
3	Weston Molonglo	18	10	3	5	60	27	+33	33	2018 ACT Capital League Finals
4	ANU FC (C)	18	10	3	5	53	21	+32	33	2018 ACT Capital League Finals
5	O'Connor Knights	18	10	3	5	37	24	+13	33	
6	Southern Tablelands United	18	6	2	10	28	57	−29	20	
7	Brindabella Blues	18	5	3	10	32	52	−20	18	
8	Narrabundah	18	4	3	11	20	45	−25	15	
9	Monaro Panthers B	18	4	3	11	22	50	−28	15	
10	Canberra Olympic B	18	4	1	13	28	53	−25	13	

Source: sportstg.com
Rules for classification: 1) points; 2) goal difference; 3) number of goals scored.
(C) Champions

==== Finals ====
Semi-finals
1	Queanbeyan City	2
2	White Eagles	3
3	Weston Molonglo	1
4	ANU FC	2

Preliminary Final
1	Queanbeyan City	1 (2)
2	ANU FC	1 (4)

Grand Final
1	White Eagles	1
2	ANU FC	6

=== 2018 Capital Football Division 1 ===
(Australian Capital Territory) Capital Football Division 1
- Season: 2018
- Champions: ADFA Vikings
- Premiers: Tigers FC
- Matches: 72
- Goals: 303 (4.21 per match)
- Top goalscorer: Samuel Isabella (25 goals)
- Biggest home win: 13–0; ADFA Vikings vs Woden Valley; 28 April 2018
- Biggest away win: 5 goals (2 times)
- Highest scoring: 4–8; Woden Valley vs Belconnen United B 4 August 2018

The 2018 ACT Capital Football Division 1 is the fourth edition of the Capital League Division 1 as the third level domestic association football competition in the ACT. The 2018 season consisted of 18 rounds with four matches played per round. The season started on 7 April 2018 and ran until 11 August 2018.

Pos	Team	Pld	W	D	L	GF	GA	GD	Pts	Qualification or relegation
1	Tigers FC	18	12	3	3	48	27	+21	39	2018 Capital Football Division 1 Finals
2	Belconnen United B	18	11	2	5	46	28	+18	35	2018 Capital Football Division 1 Finals
3	ADFA Vikings (C)	18	10	3	5	57	22	+35	33	2018 Capital Football Division 1 Finals
4	Narrabundah B	18	10	0	8	38	30	+8	30	2018 Capital Football Division 1 Finals
5	UC Pumas	18	7	4	7	34	29	+5	25	
6	ANU FC B	18	6	3	9	27	35	−8	21	
7	Lanyon United	18	3	5	10	27	43	−16	14	
8	Woden Valley	18	1	4	13	26	89	−63	7	

Source: sportstg.com
Rules for classification: 1) points; 2) goal difference; 3) number of goals scored.
(C) Champions

==== Finals ====
Semi-finals
1	Tigers FC	3
2	Belconnen United B	1
3	ADFA Vikings	4
4	Narrabundah B	3

Preliminary Final
1	Belconnen United B	1
2	ADFA Vikings	3

Grand Final
1	Tigers FC	0
2	ADFA Vikings	2

=== 2018 Women's National Premier League ACT ===
(Australian Capital Territory) NPLW Capital Football
- Season: 2018
- Champions: Belconnen United
- Premiers: Belconnen United
- Matches: 84
- Goals: 380 (4.52 per match)
- Top goalscorer: Aoife Colvill (42 goals)
- Biggest home win: 16–0; Belconnen United vs Monaro Panthers; 19 May 2018
- Biggest away win: 7 goals (2 times)
- Highest scoring: 16 goals (see biggest home win)

The highest tier domestic football competition in the ACT is known as the ACT Women's National Premier League (WNPL). Each team played each other three times for a total of 21 rounds, plus a finals series for the top 4 teams.

Pos	Team	Pld	W	D	L	GF	GA	GD	Pts	Qualification or relegation
1	Belconnen United (C)	21	20	1	0	86	6	+80	61	2018 ACT WNPL Finals
2	Canberra United Academy	21	15	1	5	92	38	+54	46	2018 ACT WNPL Finals
3	Canberra FC	21	14	2	5	47	25	+22	44	2018 ACT WNPL Finals
4	Canberra Olympic	21	10	1	10	65	57	+8	31	2018 ACT WNPL Finals
5	Gungahlin United	21	8	4	9	30	34	−4	28	
6	Woden-Weston FC	21	6	2	13	32	58	−26	20	
7	Monaro Panthers	21	5	0	16	17	86	−69	15	
8	Tuggeranong United	21	0	1	20	11	73	−62	1	

Source: sportstg.com
Rules for classification: 1) points; 2) goal difference; 3) number of goals scored.
Notes:
(C) Champions

==== Finals ====
Semi-finals
1	Belconnen United	5
2	CU Academy	2
3	Canberra FC	2
4	Canberra Olympic	0

Preliminary Final
CU Academy	2
Canberra FC	3

Grand Final
Belconnen United	3
Canberra FC	1

== Cup Competitions ==
=== 2018 Federation Cup ===
(Australian Capital Territory) 2018 Federation Cup
Tournament details
- Dates: 18 March – 16 June 2018
- Teams: 23

Final positions
- Champions: Canberra FC (18th title)
- Runners-up: Gungahlin United

Tournament statistics
- Matches played: 22
- Goals scored: 95 (4.32 per match)

2018 was the 56th edition of the Capital Football Federation Cup. The Federation cup acts as the preliminary rounds for the FFA Cup in the ACT with the Cup winner entering the subsequent FFA Cup round of 32. In 2018, the Federation Cup, which is open to all senior men's teams registered with Capital Football, consisted of two rounds, quarter-finals, semi-finals and a final. NPL clubs entered the tournament in the second round. The Cup ran from 18 March 2018 (first round) till 16 June 2018 (final). Canberra FC secured its 18th cup title and qualification to the 2018 FFA Cup with a 3–2 victory over Gungahlin with former Sydney FC player Kofi Danning scoring the winning goal at Woden Park.

2018 Capital Football Federation Cup
Tie no	Home team (tier)	Score	Away team (tier)
Round 1
1	Gundaroo FC (6)	2–3†	UC Pumas (4)
2	Southern Tablelands United (3)	2–0	Woden Valley (4)
Southern Tablelands United removed from competition for fielding an ineligible player.
3	ANU FC (3)	3–1	White Eagles (3)
4	Queanbeyan City (3)	5–0	Narrabundah FC (3)
5	Burns FC (6)	w/o	Tigers FC (4)
Walkover for Burns FC – Tigers FC removed.
6	Gungahlin Juventus (6)	2–0	Brindabella Blues (4)
7	O'Connor Knights (3)	2–0	Weston-Molonglo (3)
Round 2
1	Queanbeyan City (3)	1–2	Gungahlin United (2)
2	UC Pumas (4)	0–5	Belconnen United (2)
3	Tuggeranong United (2)	1–2	Woden Weston FC (2)
4	Burns FC (6)	1–4	Gungahlin Juventus (6)
5	ANU FC (3)	2–4†	Canberra FC (2)
6	Canberra Olympic (2)	1–0	Tigers FC (2)
7	Riverina Rhinos (2)	0–1	Monaro Panthers (2)
8	Woden Valley (4)	0–9	O'Connor Knights (3)
Quarter-finals
1	Belconnen United (2)	8–5	O'Connor Knights (3)
2	Gungahlin United (2)	6–0	Gungahlin Juventus (6)
3	Monaro Panthers (2)	2–4	Woden Weston FC (2)
4	Canberra FC (2)	2–0	Canberra Olympic (2)
Semi-finals
1	Canberra FC (2)	3–0	Belconnen United (2)
2	Gungahlin United (2)	4–3†	Woden Weston FC (2)
Final
1	Gungahlin United (2)	2–3	Canberra FC (2)

Notes:

- † = After Extra Time

=== 2018 Charity Shield ===
2018 was the third edition of the annual ACT Charity Shield contested to kick off the 2018 Capital Football season. Money raised from the event goes towards a nominated charity, which in 2018 was Ronald McDonald House Canberra. Canberra Olympic and Tuggeranong United contested the Shield in 2018. Olympic claimed its second consecutive Charity Shield title with a 3–1 victory.

16 March 2018	Canberra Olympic	3–1	Tuggeranong United	Woden, Canberra
18:30	Popovich 24'; Habtemariam 35', 88'	Report	Crkovsk 42'	Stadium: Melrose Synthetic

== See also ==
- Soccer in the Australian Capital Territory
- Sport in the Australian Capital Territory
- 2018 National Premier Leagues Capital Football Grand Final
