= 1927 Federal Capital Territory Soccer Football Association season =

The 1927 Capital Football season was the second Capital Football season.

== 1927 FCTSA League ==
The 1927 FCTSA League is the second season of the FCTSA League, the former top Australian professional soccer league in the Capital Football.

=== Teams ===
- Burns
- Canberra
- Molonglo
- Queanbeyan

=== League table ===
| Pos | Team | Pld | W | D | L | GF | GA | GD | Pts | |
|---|---|---|---|---|---|---|---|---|---|---|
| 1 | Molonglo (C) | 9 | 6 | 3 | 0 | 23 | 13 | +10 | 15 | Qualification to Finals series (Note: The team ranked first automatically enters the Grand Final, while second and third qualify for the semi-final.) |
| 2 | Burns | 10 | 6 | 1 | 3 | 28 | 22 | +6 | 13 | Qualification to Finals series |
| 3 | Queanbeyan | 9 | 2 | 1 | 6 | 19 | 20 | −1 | 5 | Qualification to Finals series |
| 4 | Canberra | 8 | 1 | 1 | 6 | 15 | 30 | −15 | 3 | |

Source: Socceraust.co
Rules for classification: 1) Points; 2) Goal difference; 3) Goals scored
(C) Champions

=== Results ===
| Home \ Away | BUR | CAN | MOL | QUE | BUR | CAN | MOL | QUE |
|---|---|---|---|---|---|---|---|---|
| Burns | — | 6–2 | 0–0 | 4–1 | — | — | 2–2 | — |
| Canberra | 0–3 | — | 2–4 | 4–2 | 1–5 | — | — | — |
| Molonglo | 2–0 | 6–4 | — | — | 3–0 | 2–2 | — | — |
| Queanbeyan | 4–5 | 2–0 | 2–2 | — | 7–3 | — | 1–2 | — |

Updated to match(es) played on 10 September 1927. Source: Socceraust.co
Legend: Blue = home team win; Yellow = draw; Red = away team win.

=== Finals Series ===
==== Semi-final ====
| 17 September 1927 | Burns | 0–2 | Queanbeyan |

==== Grand Final ====
| 24 September 1927 | Molonglo | 1–0 | Queanbeyan | Queanbeyan |
| | Allison | | | Stadium: Queanbeyan Park |
