= Jason Madonis =

Australian footballer (born 1995)

Personal information
- Date of birth: 1 August 1995 (age 31)
- Place of birth: Sydney, Australia
- Height: 1.76 m (5 ft 9 in)
- Position: Midfielder

Team information
- Current team: Wollongong Olympic
- Number: 5

Youth career
- 2008–2013: Sydney Olympic

Senior career*
Years	Team	Apps	(Gls)
2014–2021	Sydney Olympic	140	(23)
2022	Sutherland Sharks	18	(3)
2023	Sydney United	10	(0)
2024–	Wollongong Olympic	42	(9)
- * Club domestic league appearances and goals as of 30 January 2026

Jason Madonis (born 1 August 1995) is an Australian footballer who plays as a midfielder for Wollongong Olympic.

== Early life ==
Madonis has played club football since the age of 4, his father was an influence on his decision to play football throughout his life. He attended Trinity Grammar School where he played for the school's soccer team, winning the 2011 NSW School Competition. In June 2013, he was selected to play for the NSW School Boys Football Team.

== Club career ==
=== Sydney Olympic ===
Madonis joined Sydney Olympic at the age of 13. He played in the U18 NPL NSW Final where his side won with 10-men as he scored the game-winning goal. He broke into the first team in 2014, being on the bench in the Grand Final where his side lost 2–1 against Blacktown City. In the 2019 season, Madonis came close to another finals appearance after scoring a penalty to beat Sydney United but ultimately came short after falling 6th in the league, just below play-offs at the closing end of the season. In the 2020 season, Madonis played in the finals series losing 3–0 in the semi-final against Rockdale Ilinden, formerly called Rockdale City Suns. Madonis made his 150 senior club appearance for Sydney Olympic against Manly United.

=== Sutherland Sharks ===
On 11 February 2022, it was announced Madonis joined the Sutherland Sharks after leaving Olympic sometime in August 2021.

=== Sydney United 58 ===
On 23 December 2022, Madonis was announced to play for Sydney United ahead of the 2023 season. He made his United debut in a 3–1 loss against APIA Leichhardt, coming on as a substitute in the 83rd minute of the match.

== Personal life ==
Madonis currently has a partner, Alexandra, for who he has been with for more than 4 1/2 years and a dog called Romeo. He does private one on one coaching in the Sutherland Shire area.
