= Monaro Panthers FC =

- Full name: Monaro Panthers Football Club
- Nickname: Panthers
- Founded: 1967
- Ground: Stryda Park, Queanbeyan
- Coordinates: 35°20′53″S 149°14′15″E
- Manager: Frank Cachia
- League: NPL Capital Football
- 2026: 2nd of 11
- Website: http://www.monaropanthers.com.au/
Home colours	Away colours

Monaro Panthers FC (formerly known as Inter Monaro SC) is an Australian soccer club based in the city of Queanbeyan, New South Wales. The club was founded in 1967, and currently competes in the National Premier Leagues Capital Football in the Australian Capital Territory.

Monaro Panthers is a club that represents and caters for the Monaro regional area as a whole including Queanbeyan, Jerrabomberra, Canberra, Googong, Bungendore, Sutton, Michelago and the South Coast of NSW. The club fields teams in both men's and women's from the elite NPL level and recreational seniors to juniors and mini roos.

== History ==
=== Foundation and early years ===
Monaro was established in 1967 as Inter Monaro Soccer Club. The club first competed in the ACT league Division 1 (top division) between 1968 and 1977 before moving to the New South Wales (NSW) system in 1978 where the club played until they won the NSW Division one (top division) title in 1984. In 1985 the club were accepted into the National Soccer League.

Inter enjoyed early success in the ACT with the club winning its first trophy in its first season. Monaro lifted the end of season 1968 top four round-robin trophy as a second-tier side after beating Olympic (now Canberra Olympic) 1–0 in the final. Inter reached the final after a 1–0 victory over Croatia Deakin (now Canberra FC) in the quarter-finals and a 2–1 victory over Juventus in the semi-finals.

Monaro backed up this success in 1976 when they once again won the Federation Cup tournament with wins over Canberra United, 6–2, West Woden Juventus, 1–0, leading the club to a final showdown with Downer Olympic on 29 August 1976. Inter Monaro despatched Downer 3–1 in the final to claim the title for the first time in the club's short history.

1977 was Inters most successful season in its history. Not only did Monaro successfully defend its Federation Cup title, it additionally won both the league Premiership and finals Championship titles too, giving the club its first 'treble'. Inter won the league title in 1977 by five points over West Woden Juventus in the fourteen-game season. Monaro finished the season with the equal best attack (60 goals scored) and the best defence (13 goals conceded). Inter then met West Woden twice in the finals in the semi-final and the grand final. On both occasions Monaro secured 3–2 victories. Inter kicked off its Fed Cup defence in 1977 with a 10–0 victory over O'Connor before beating Canberra United 3–0 in the qualifier final to reach the final on 4 September 1977. Monaro again faced off against Canberra United, who had beaten Croatia Deakin to reach the final, where the Premiers and Champions overcame the opposition put up from United to claim a 2–1 victory.

=== National Soccer League and decline ===
After winning New South Wales Division 1 in 1984, Inter Monaro entered the NSL for the 1985 season, replacing Melita Eagles in the Northern Conference. In Monaro's first season they finished 7th in the Northern Conference, two points outside of a finals position and one place below local rivals Canberra City who finished 6th. In 1985 National League Cup (NSL Cup), Inter defeated West Woden Juventus 9–1 in the first round before being eliminated in the second round by Canberra City 1–0.

The second season in the NSL in 1986 was less successful. In the 1986 National League Cup, Inter Monaro were eliminated by Canberra City once again, losing this time 2–1 in the first round. Inter finished bottom of the league table with only three wins from 22 games, and a restructure of the national competition for the 1987 season cutting back to 13 teams saw the club relegated back to the NSW First Division.

After getting relegated from the NSL in the club's second season, Monaro returned to the NSW Division One for four seasons between 1987 and 1990. Inter were not able to keep up with previous success and after a disappointing 1990 season where the club only collected six points and two wins, they finished 2nd last in the league (beating only Marconi Fairfield). Inter Monaro subsequently did not enter in a team in 1991 and effectively ceased to exist.

=== Re-establishment ===
In 1995 the club was re-established under a new name, Monaro Panthers Football Club. The club went back to its roots and applied and was granted entry into the ACT Premier League in 1996. The club has participated in the ACT league system since this date. A key figure to the re-establishment of the club was the future Deputy Premier of New South Wales John Barilaro, who went on to serve as president of the club for eight years.

The Panthers won the ACT Premier League Championship title in 1999 with a 1–0 victory over the Capital City Suns in the grand final. Monaro had qualified for the Championship finals after finishing third in the league behind Capital City Suns and Weston Creek Royals. In the semi-final the team from Queanbeyan overcame Weston Creek to reach the grand final.

In 2008, Monaro signed an Australian first agreement with South Korean football primary school SinGok from the east Busan district of Haeundae New Town. The agreement means Panther's members host SinGok club players, coaches and officials during the annual youth football tournament The Kanga Cup, held in Canberra every year. In exchange Monaro would gain professional coaching advice and potential links to South Korean talent. Monaro were also invited by SinGok to participate in the 2008 MBC International Youth Tournament in Korea. John Barilaro, Amelia Efkarpidis and Nadia Colbertaldo were the intramental Panther figures who designed and signed off on the agreement.

=== National Premier League Era ===
2013, the Monaro Panthers joined the top clubs in the ACT and surrounding NSW region as a founding member of the NPL Capital Football, which replaced the ACT Premier League as the top division of club football in Canberra.

10 October 2014, Monaro was one of four clubs to be granted a premier licence by Capital Football to compete in the NPL competitions for three years for men, women and juniors. The licence was set to commence in 2015.

2 April 2017, Monaro Panthers celebrated its fifty-year anniversary with the opening round of the 2017 NPLCF season against Canberra Olympic at Riverside Stadium. The Panthers went down 1–3 in the final result of the match.

== Club identity ==
Inter Monaro SC original crest used between 1967 and 1991

Monaro Panthers FC crest used between 1995 and 2016

Monaro Panthers FC 50-year crest used in 2017

=== Colours and crest ===
The Panther's primary colours are green and black. Over the course of the club's history the shade of green has changed from kit to kit. On the home kit the colours are represented in vertical stripes. White is used as an alternative colour, mainly for away kits. The club's crest consists of a black panther clutching a football with one paw and the club's name underneath in green. The club's original crest was a traditional shield with the bottom half showcasing a football a top of black and green stripe background. The top half of the crest has the club's original name of Inter Monaro Soccer Club in black atop a yellow background. Above the team name, the very top of the shield is broken into the tri colours of the Italian national flag, representing the club's heritage.

In 2017, Monaro released a fifty-year anniversary crest. The crest draw inspiration from both the original and modern crests. In the traditional shield the club retained the black and green stripes for the bottom half. It added the number 50, a small black panther and the dates 1967 and 2017. The top half of the crest had the current club name of Monaro Panthers Football Club atop a black background.

=== Club name ===
The club was established in 1967 as Inter Monaro Soccer Club by the local Italian community of Queanbeyan. Inter represented the Italian heritage and Monaro was chosen because the city of Queanbeyan was in the electorate of Eden Monaro. The club retained its original name until folding in 1991. In 1995 the club was re-established with a new name, Monaro Panthers Football Club. In 2022 the club claimed the Charity Shield with a 7-1 success over Tigers FC and then won the Federation Cup, which doubled as the Australia Cup Qualifying Final in Canberra, defeating West Canberra Wanderers 3–1 after extra-time. Andre Carle equalised with the last kick of the match, after coming on as a substitute, before Darren Bailey and Carle, from the penalty spot, sealed the win in extra-time.

=== Monaro Panthers Supporters Club ===
The Monaro Panthers Supporters Club is held inside the VIP Box of Riverside Stadium during every NPL Home match for Monaro's First Grade and U23 Matches. The Members of the Monaro Panthers supporters are made up of former Inter Monaro Players such as Alex Tiné, Anthony Zanetti, Frank Beltrami, and Gianni Guglielmin. The Supporters club brings back the traditions of the old Inter Monaro and remains an exclusive experience for Monaro Panthers, Players, Supporters and Members.

== Players ==
=== Current squad ===
As of 8 July 2025

Note: Flags indicate national team as defined under FIFA eligibility rules; some limited exceptions apply. Players may hold more than one non-FIFA nationality.

No.	Pos.	Nation	Player
1	GK	AUS	Jordan Thurtell
2	DF	AUS	Adam De Franceschi
18	MF	AUS	Conor Mynott-Smith
4	FW	AUS	Daniel Barac
5	FW	AUS	Giuseppe Tine
6	MF	AUS	Gabriel Cole
7	FW	GRE	Nikos Kalfas
9	FW	AUS	Andre Carle
10	MF	ALB	Amilio Kista
11	MF	AUS	Adam Neou
12	FW	AUS	Stephen Domenici
14	DF	AUS	Michael Pochi

No.	Pos.	Nation	Player
15	FW	AUS	Robert Thatchenko
16	DF	AUS	Roko Strika
17	MF	AUS	Ben Basser-Silk
30	MF	AUS	Michael Piccolo
19	MF	AUS	Luca Macor
20	FW	AUS	Jai Selden
21	DF	AUS	Jordan Cachia
22	GK	AUS	Gerion Mehmetaj
23	FW	AUS	Kofi Danning
24	DF	AUS	James La Vella
91	MF	AUS	Zac McLaren
99	DF	AUS	Josh Calabria

== Notable Former Players ==
- Sebastian Giampaolo

== Coaching staff ==
Senior Monaro Panthers NPL men's team staff for the 2022 Capital Football season.

As of 8 June 2022

- Men's Head Coach: Frank Cachia
- Assistant coach: Andrew Monterosso
- Manager: Paolo Macor
- Assistant coach: Matt Cachia
- President: Aaron Hazelton
- Treasurer: Alex Tine
- Coordinator: Frank Beltrami
- Head of Juniors: Tina Brandt

== Honours ==
- ACT League Premiers and Finals Champions
  - Premiers (1): 1977
  - Champions (2): 1977, 1999
- Capital Football Federation Cup
  - Winners (3): 1976, 1977, 2022
- Capital Football Charity Shield
  - Winners (1): 2022
- New South Wales Division One
  - Premiers (1): 1984
  - Runner-up (1): 1979
  - Champions (1): 1979
  - Runner-up (1): 1984

== Season-by-season results ==
The below table is updated with the statistics and final results for Monaro Panthers following the conclusion of each National Premier League Capital Football season.

Champions	Runners-up	Third place

Monaro Panthers FC Season-by-Season Results
Ref	Season	National Premier League ACT										NPL Finals	Fed Cup	FFA Cup	Top scorer	
Ref	Season	GP	W	D	L	GF	GA	GD	PTS	League	Finals	NPL Finals	Fed Cup	FFA Cup	Name	Goals
	2013	23	6	1	16	30	78	−48	19	8th	–	–	3R	–	Pepe Varga	10
	2014	16	4	2	10	26	59	−33	14	8th	–	–	2R	–	Thomas James	5
	2015	16	2	2	12	19	48	−29	8	8th	–	–	QF	–	Mark Shields	16
	2016	18	4	2	12	22	49	−27	14	9th	–	–	2R	–	Mark Shields	10
	2017	18	1	2	15	11	62	−51	5	10th	–	–	SF	–	Joakim Moussinga	4
	2018	16	1	3	12	17	46	−29	6	9th	–	–	QF	–	Samuel Smith	8
	2019	16	6	2	8	31	33	-2	20	7th	–	–	R2	–	Joshua Gulevski	14
	2020	7	1	2	4	7	12	-5	5	8th	–	–	–	–	Samuel Smith	3
	2021	17	7	4	6	28	28	0	25	4th	–	–	F	–	Stephen Domenici	15
