= National Premier Leagues Men's =

National Premier Leagues
- Organising body: Football Australia
- Founded: 13 February 2013; 13 years ago
- First season: 2013
- Country: Australia
- Confederation: AFC
- Divisions: ACT; NSW; Northern NSW; Northern Territory; Queensland; South Australia; Tasmania; Victoria; Western Australia
- Number of clubs: 100 clubs (from 8 divisions)
- Level on pyramid: 2
- Most championships: Sydney United 58 (2 titles)
- Website: nationalpremierleagues.com.au
- Current: 2026 National Premier Leagues Men's

The National Premier Leagues Men's (NPL Men's) is a men's national association football league in Australia which acts as the second tier of the sport in the country below the A-League Men. The NPL consists of the highest level men's state league in each state-based federation within Australia. In total the NPL is contested by clubs from eight divisions; these are ACT, NSW, Northern NSW, Queensland, South Australia, Tasmania, Victoria and Western Australia. The NPL is overseen by Football Australia, in partnership with participating state-based member federations.

From 2013 to 2019, one representative from each Member Federation participated in the NPL Championship, a knock-out competition to determine a national champion.

Since the 2025 season, a subset of NPL clubs, including the NPL Premiers from each Member Federation, play in a post-season spring competition called the Australian Championship, played between October and December each year.

== History ==
In October 2010, Football Federation Australia (FFA) commenced a National Competition Review, its main objective being to review the current structure of soccer competitions in Australia, and to monitor and improve elite player development. By May 2012 the results of the National Competition Review were released. In it, a proposal to re-brand and revitalise state-based competitions in Australia.

On 13 February 2013, the establishment of the NPL was announced. As a direct outcome of the National Competition Review, the league would rebrand the premier league in each state under a single banner. The competition was initially named the "Australian Premier League", but because of a violation of naming rights held by Lawn Bowls Australia the original name was scrapped and replaced with "National Premier Leagues".

The inaugural season of the NPL began in March 2013. It included teams from five of the nine state-based federations:

- Australian Capital Territory
- New South Wales
- Queensland
- South Australia
- Tasmania

The other four of the nine state-based federations joined the NPL in 2014:

- Northern New South Wales
- Northern Territory
- Victoria
- Western Australia

Those federations who joined in the 2014 season, were expected to adopt a partial model at some time in the future. Although Victoria initially announced their teams would enter in 2014, a deferral was later announced in November 2013, after several clubs objected to the process for selecting teams. However, by December 2013, a resolution was reached whereby Victorian teams participated in the 2014 season.

The finals series for the 2020 competition was cancelled on 3 July 2020 due to the COVID-19 pandemic in Australia, and has not been held since.

FFA announced their intentions of a promotion and relegation structure between the first tier A-League and a proposed second tier (which ultimately resulted in the formation on the Australian Championship series), but a promotion and relegation system did not eventuate.

== Competition format ==
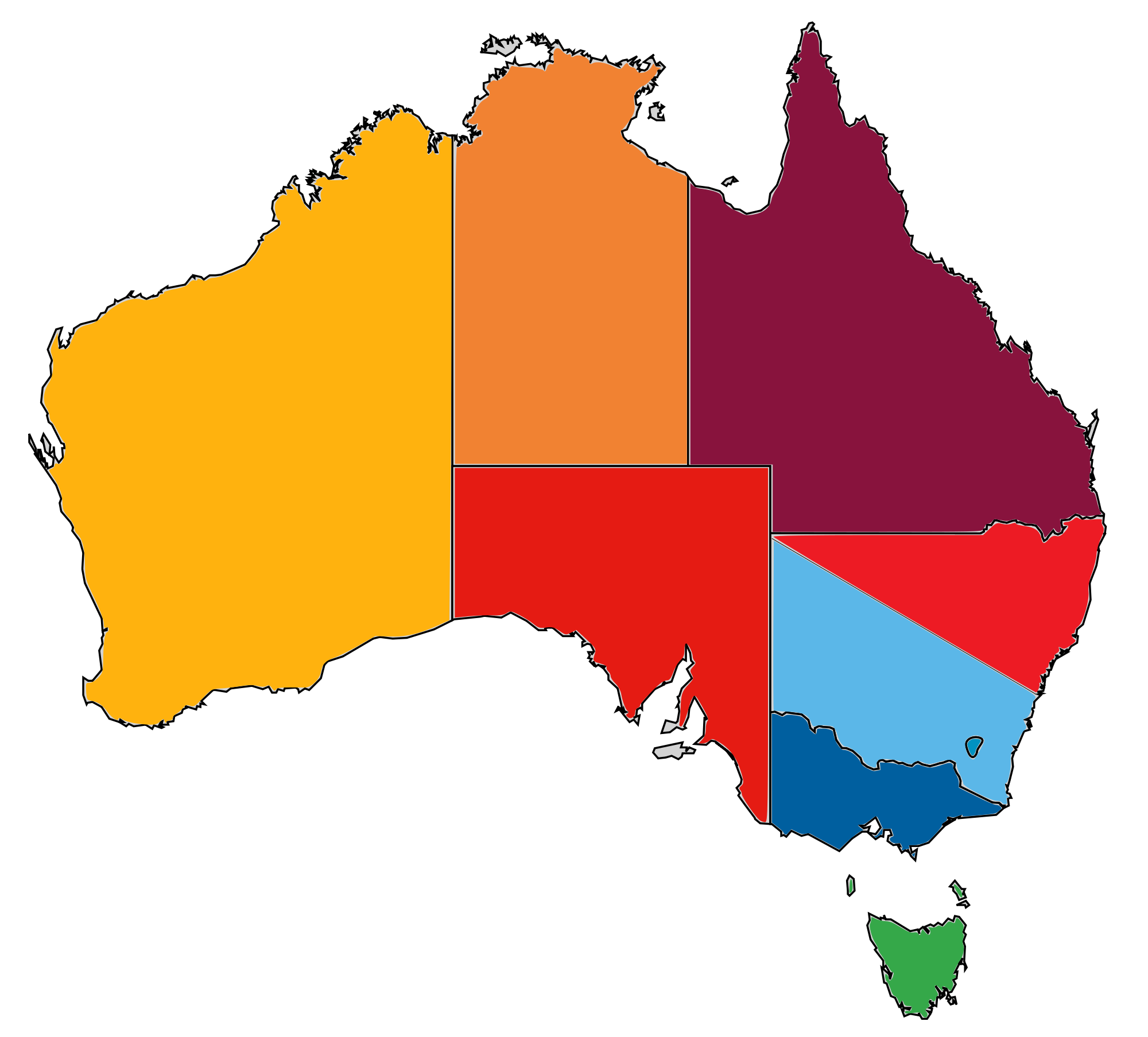
A diagram showing the state member federations of FFA.

Map showing the location of teams in the National Premier Leagues.

The NPL competitions in each state and territory are run by the member federation, with a national playoff tournament at the end of each season. Each member federation, or 'conference' contains various numbers of teams, and they play a full season with no inter-conference matches (an identical format to the individual State Leagues that preceded the NPL). The winner of each division is determined by the club in first position of each conference table at the end of the regular season, rather than the winner of the various state-based finals series.

=== Former NPL finals series ===
Up to the 2019 season, the winners of each respective Federation league (the regular home and away season) competed in a finals playoff tournament. These were all single match knock out matches. Between 2013 and 2015 the match ups were based on predetermined geographically adjacent Federations, with hosting rights for the quarter-finals alternating each year. From 2016 to 2019 the match ups were determined by an open draw. The hosts for the semi-finals and Grand Final were determined by a formula based on the time of winning of the previous NPL Finals matches (normal time, extra time or penalties), goals scored and allowed, and yellow/red cards.

The finals series culminated in a Grand Final, where the winner was crowned National Premier Leagues Champions. From 2014 to 2019, the NPL Champion also qualified for the following years' FFA Cup round of 32.

=== Promotion and relegation ===
Depending on the State Federation in charge, teams may be relegated from the NPL to a third-tier league in the same state (and vice versa), but there is currently no mechanism for a team to be promoted to the first tier of Australian soccer, the A-League. The number of teams promoted and relegated from third-tier leagues per state has varied over the existence of the NPL. The table below details the number of teams relegated automatically from the NPL at the end of the season (based on 2025) and the number of NPL teams which go into a relegation playoff against a lower league team (subject to those lower league teams meeting additional eligibility criteria to be able to be promoted to the NPL).

Federation	Number of clubs	
Federation	Automatic relegation	Relegation playoffs
ACT	none	
NSW	1	1
Northern NSW	1	1
Queensland	2	0
SA	2	0
Tasmania	none	
Victoria	3	0
WA	1	1

== Current clubs ==
Below are listed the National Premier Leagues clubs in each respective state member federation, who will compete in the 2027 season.

Excluding the Northern Territory, there are 100 clubs that compete in the top tier of the NPL each season. Most NPL divisions involve promotion and relegation to leagues below the NPL and so participating clubs change annually.

Australian Capital Territory Belconnen United Brindabella Blues Canberra Croatia Canberra Juventus Canberra Olympic Canberra White Eagles Monaro Panthers O'Connor Knights Queanbeyan City Tigers FC Tuggeranong United	New South Wales APIA Leichhardt Blacktown City Manly United Marconi Stallions North West Sydney Spirit Rockdale Ilinden SD Raiders St George City St George FC Sutherland Sharks Sydney FC Youth Sydney United 58 UNSW FC Western Sydney Wanderers Youth Wollongong Wolves	Northern New South Wales Adamstown Rosebud Belmont Swansea Broadmeadow Magic Cooks Hill United Edgeworth Eagles Kahibah FC Lambton Jaffas Maitland FC Newcastle Olympic Valentine FC Weston Bears	Queensland Brisbane City Eastern Suburbs Gold Coast Knights Lions FC Magic United Moreton City Excelsior Olympic FC Peninsula Power Rochedale Rovers Wynnum Wolves

South Australia Adelaide City Adelaide Croatia Raiders Adelaide United Youth Campbelltown City Croydon FC Modbury Jets FK Beograd North Eastern MetroStars Playford City Sturt Lions West Adelaide West Torrens Birkalla	Tasmania Clarence Zebras Devonport City Glenorchy Knights Kingborough Lions United Launceston City Riverside Olympic South East United South Hobart	Victoria Altona Magic Avondale Brunswick Juventus Caroline Springs George Cross Dandenong City Heidelberg United Hume City Melbourne City Youth Melbourne Knights Northcote City Oakleigh Cannons Preston Lions South Melbourne St Albans Saints	Western Australia Armadale SC Bayswater City Dianella White Eagles Floreat Athena Fremantle City Olympic Kingsway Perth Azzurri Perth Glory Youth Perth RedStar Sorrento FC Stirling Macedonia Western Knights

== Honours ==
=== Federation Premiers by season ===
Season	ACT	New South Wales	Northern New South Wales	Queensland	South Australia	Tasmania	Victoria	Western Australia
2013	Canberra Croatia	Sydney United 58	— (Note: Northern NSW, Victoria and Western Australia were not part of the inaugural NPL finals series.)	Olympic FC	Campbelltown City (Note: North Eastern MetroStars won its league season, but did not proceed to the NPL Finals series (that year's Champion qualified instead).)	South Hobart	—	—
2014	Cooma FC	Bonnyrigg White Eagles	Weston Workers (Note: Newcastle Jets Youth team won its league season, but were ineligible for the NPL Finals series (the runner-up qualified instead).)	Palm Beach	North Eastern MetroStars	South Hobart	South Melbourne	Bayswater City
2015	Canberra Croatia	Blacktown City	Edgeworth FC	Moreton Bay United	West Adelaide	Olympia Warriors	South Melbourne	Bayswater City
2016	Canberra Olympic	Sydney United 58	Edgeworth FC	Brisbane Strikers	Adelaide City	Devonport City	Bentleigh Greens	Perth SC
2017	Canberra Olympic	APIA Leichhardt	Edgeworth FC	Brisbane Strikers	Adelaide City	South Hobart	Heidelberg United	Bayswater City
2018	Canberra Croatia	Sydney Olympic	Edgeworth FC	Lions FC	Campbelltown City	Devonport City	Heidelberg United	Perth SC
2019	Canberra Olympic	Wollongong Wolves	Maitland FC	Lions FC	Campbelltown City	Devonport City	Heidelberg United	Perth SC
2020 (Note: Competition Premiers only, as finals series cancelled due to the COVID-19 pandemic in Australia.)	— (Note: No Premier declared.)	Rockdale City Suns	Edgeworth FC	Peninsula Power	Adelaide Comets	Devonport City	— (Note: 2020 for Victoria cancelled due to the COVID-19 pandemic.)	— (Note: No Premier declared.)
2021	Cooma FC (Note: Season cancelled, but Premier declared.)	— (Note: 2021 for NSW cancelled due to the COVID-19 pandemic.)	Lambton Jaffas (Note: Season cancelled, but Premier declared.)	Peninsula Power	Adelaide Comets	Glenorchy Knights	Oakleigh Cannons (Note: 2021 for Victoria initially cancelled due to the COVID-19 pandemic. However, as a result of a court challenge involving Avondale FC and Football Victoria, it was agreed that eight rounds of games from the 2022 NPL Season would also count towards the 2021 NPL league table, enabling sufficient matches to be played to "complete" the season, and be able to declare a Premier for 2021.)	Perth SC
2022	Canberra Croatia	Sydney Olympic	Maitland FC	Lions FC	Adelaide City	Devonport City	South Melbourne	Floreat Athena
2023	O'Connor Knights	APIA Leichhardt	Lambton Jaffas	Gold Coast Knights	North Eastern MetroStars	Devonport City	Avondale FC	Perth RedStar
2024	Gungahlin United	Rockdale Ilinden	Broadmeadow Magic	Gold Coast Knights	North Eastern MetroStars	Glenorchy Knights	South Melbourne	Olympic Kingsway
2025	Canberra Croatia	NWS Spirit	Broadmeadow Magic	Moreton City Excelsior	North Eastern MetroStars	South Hobart	Avondale FC	Bayswater City
2026	Canberra Croatia	APIA Leichhardt	Broadmeadow Magic	Lions FC	Adelaide City	South Hobart	Oakleigh Cannons	Bayswater City

=== NPL Finals ===
2019 was the final year when NPL Finals were held.

Season/s	Champions	Score	Runners-up	Venue	Attendance
2013	(New South Wales) Sydney United 58	2–0	(Tasmania) South Hobart	KGV Park	1,150
2014	(South Australia) North Eastern MetroStars	1–0	(New South Wales) Bonnyrigg White Eagles	Lambert Park	–
2015	(New South Wales) Blacktown City	3–1	(Western Australia) Bayswater City	Dorrien Gardens	–
2016	(New South Wales) Sydney United 58	4–1	(New South Wales) Edgeworth FC	Sydney United Sports Centre	–
2017	(Victoria (state)) Heidelberg United	2–0	(Queensland) Brisbane Strikers	Perry Park	1,105
2018	(South Australia) Campbelltown City	2–1	(Queensland) Lions FC	Steve Woodcock Sports Centre	1,518
2019	(New South Wales) Wollongong Wolves	4–3 (a.e.t.)	(Queensland) Lions FC	Albert Butler Memorial Park	1,362
2020	Cancelled (Note: The 2020 Finals Series and the 2020 FFA Cup were cancelled due to the COVID-19 pandemic in Australia. Wollongong Wolves had already qualified for the 2020 FFA Cup prior to the COVID-19 pandemic, so were given an automatic entry into the 2021 FFA Cup.)				

== Individual honours ==
The John Kosmina Medal is presented to the best player in the NPL final and is named in honour of former Australian international John Kosmina.

== See also ==
- National Premier Leagues Women's
- Football Australia
- Australian soccer league system
- Australian Championship
