= Capital Football =

Governing body for soccer in the Australian Capital Territory

- Formation: 2005 (21 years ago)
- Type: Territory Sporting Association
- Legal status: Active
- Headquarters: Football House, Deakin
- Location: (Australian Capital Territory) Canberra, ACT
- Coordinates: 35°19′36.9″S 149°5′41″E
- Region served: ACT; Monaro, NSW; Southern Tablelands, NSW
- Members: 58,600 (2019)
- CEO: Ivan Slavich
- Parent organisation: ACT Football Federation
- Affiliations: Football Australia
- Staff: 22+
- Website: capitalfootball.com.au

Capital Football is the trading name for the ACT Football Federation Incorporated, the state governing body for soccer in the Australian Capital Territory (ACT), but also has affiliated clubs based in surrounding areas of New South Wales. It is affiliated with Football Australia, the national governing body.

== History ==
Capital Football was founded in the 1960s as the ACT Soccer Federation Incorporated. The organisation replaced the defunct Federal Capital Territory Soccer Football Association which controlled soccer in the ACT between 1926 and 1932 and the Federal Monaro District Soccer Association which lasted two years (1932–33). The Great Depression and World War II saw soccer all but disappear in the ACT with no new federation established and the odd team playing infrequent matches in NSW. Following the conclusion of the war new migrant communities settled in Canberra and founded clubs such as Juventus, Olympic, Croatia and Hungaria. These clubs formed the backbone of the new ACT Soccer Federation in the 1960s. The new federation and the clubs adopted a policy in 1960 to remove ethnic names but by 1966 this policy was abandoned and ethnic names returned. The ACT Soccer Federation continued to serve as the state federation body of the ACT under the trading name Soccer Canberra until 2005 when the organisation went through a restructure and rebranding in accordance with the new national rebranding set down by the new national federation, Football Federation Australia (FFA). The organisation's name changed to the ACT Football Federation Incorporated and it started trading under the guise of Capital Football.

In 2008, then Capital Football CEO Heather Reid was instrumental in securing Capital Football a W-League franchise licence from FFA, the only licence given to an entity not associated with an A-League team. Capital Football established Canberra United FC to compete in the inaugural W-League season in 2008-09. Canberra United finished the season in third place behind Queensland Roar and Newcastle Jets before going on to win their semi-final against the Jets 1-0 and losing the grand final 0-2 against the Roar.

2 April 2015, it was reported that Capital Football's membership numbers had swelled to 12,500 players after recording membership numbers of 10,512 in 2013 and 11,655 in 2014. The steady increase in numbers caused Capital Football to enter into regular talks with the ACT Government regarding identifying new playing grounds as the number of players and teams had reached a breaking point.

15 December 2015, Capital Football announced the amalgamation of its various elite high performance soccer programs into one entity, Canberra United Academy (CUA). The state federation additionally announced the Academy program would compete in the 2016 National Premier Leagues Capital Football season, increasing the total number of teams in the ACT's top men's division to ten. 17 December 2015, the eight ACT NPL clubs swiftly voiced their concerns regarding the new academy and its proposed ‘user pay’ system. 4 January 2016, Capital Football technical director, Warren Grieve, announced the intention for the state federation to push for the newly established academy to be granted a National Youth League licence by the FFA. Grieve noted this became the federation's responsibility due to the absence of an A-League team in the region. 10 February 2016, Canberra's NPL teams announced they would boycott all matches involving the Canberra United Academy including pre-season fixtures unless Capital Football removed CUA from the NPL and gave all eight clubs voting rights on the Capital Football board. 11 February 2016, FFA technical director, Eric Abrams, met with ACT NPL club presidents to discuss their ongoing concerns with the Canberra United Academy. Fairfax Media reported discussions had occurred regarding a break-away league being established if the impasse was not overcome. 31 March 2016, outgoing Capital Football CEO, Heather Reid, revealed ongoing discussions had been taking place between the federation and NPL club presidents regarding the CUA issue. She reiterated, along with board member Mark O’Neill that they were confident a resolution would be found shortly. 7 April 2016, Capital Football and the NPL clubs came to an agreement not to boycott matches against CUA in the first half of the season as a sign of good-faith to the new CF CEO. Meetings would continue to take place during this time to determine the long-term future. 27 May 2016, Cooma president, Harry Hovasapain, confirmed all NPL teams would play CUA for the rest of the 2016 season, noting the clubs, the federation board, the CEO and the competition manager were all now working closely and moving in the right direction. 27 February 2017, CF announced that CUA would continue to operate but would align with the FFA Centre of Excellence for the 2017 NPL season, freeing up a league place for Riverina Rhinos to join the league.

== Headquarters ==
Capital Football's headquarters is located at Football House in the south-central Canberra suburb of Deakin, ACT (address: 2/3 Phipps Cl, Deakin ACT 2600). The first public mention of building a home for football in the ACT named "Football House" came on 14 September 1948 when Canberra Football League president, C A Donnelly, mentioned the idea in an article for local newspaper The Canberra Times. Mr Donnelly suggested the total costs of building the headquarters would be £8,000.

== Administration ==
Capital Football Board, as of 16 March 2023

Capital Football Board
Role	Staff
Chair & Director	(Australia) Angelo Konstantinou
Deputy chair & Director	(Australia) Fran Sankey
Director	(Australia) Kim Ward
Director	(Australia) Gary Vandeburgt
Director	(Australia) Justin Webb

== Competitions ==
Capital Football runs a number of men's, women's and junior competitions:

Capital Football Competitions
Men's	Women's	Juniors	Mixed
NPL Capital Football Men's	NPL Capital Football Women's	NPL Boys	PSFA
Capital Premier League Men's (defunct)	State League 1-6	NPL Girls	ANU Mixed Social Futsal
State League 1-3	Women's Federation Cup	Kanga Cup	Diplomatic Corps Cup
State League Reserves 1-3	Charity Shield Women's	ACT MiniRoos	Walking Football
Community League 1-5	Masters 1	ACT Junior Leagues	Powerchair League
Federation Cup	Futsal 1-3
Charity Shield Men's
Masters 1-3
Masters Over 45s
Futsal 1-5

== Associated clubs ==
=== Owned and operated teams ===
Capital Football owns and operates the A-League Women franchise team Canberra United Football Club since its inception in 2008 into the competition, which was then called W-League.

=== Affiliated clubs ===
As of 2021, Capital Football has a total of 31 affiliated senior men's and women's clubs, listed below. 23 clubs are from the ACT with and 8 clubs from the Monaro, Southern Tablelands and Riverina regions of NSW (including two clubs from Queanbeyan and one club each from Goulburn, Cooma, Yass, Palerang, Wagga Wagga and Griffith).

ACT ADFA Vikings ANU FC Belconnen United Belnorth FC Belsouth FC Belwest Foxes Brindabella Blues Burns FC Canberra Croatia FC Canberra City Canberra Juventus Canberra Olympic Gungahlin United Lanyon United Majura FC Narrabundah FC O'Connor Knights South Canberra FC Tuggeranong United UC Pumas White Eagles FC Weston-Molonglo FC Woden Valley FC Woden Weston FC	NSW Cooma FC (Note: The official name of Cooma Football Club's National Premier Leagues side is "Tigers FC".) Monaro Panthers Palerang United Queanbeyan City Riverina Rhinos Southern Tablelands United Wagga City Wanderers Yass FC

== See also ==
- Soccer in the Australian Capital Territory
- Sport in the Australian Capital Territory
