= Canberra Olympic FC =

Australian semi-professional football club

- Full name: Canberra Olympic Football Club
- Nickname: Olympic
- Founded: 1956
- Ground: O'Connor Enclosed
- Capacity: 1,000
- Coordinates: 35°15′39″S 149°7′25″E
- President: John Efkarpidis
- Head Coach: Eric Bonnett
- League: NPL Capital Football
- 2026: 7th of 11
- Website: www.canberraolympicfc.com.
Home colours	Away colours

Canberra Olympic FC is an Australian semi-professional soccer club based in the suburb of O'Connor in the north of Canberra, Australian Capital Territory. The club was founded in 1956, and currently competes in the National Premier Leagues Capital Football.

== History ==
Olympic was founded in the early 1950s by the local Greek community of Canberra. Formally the name Olympic was decided in a General Meeting of players and committee members in 1956 with the alternative name AEK losing out in the vote.

Olympic have won the ACT top division league (premiership) on seven occasions under the names Canberra Olympic, Olympic and Downer Olympic. The most recent title was the NPL Capital Football premiership in 2017.

In addition to this, Olympic have won six grand finals (championship). The most recent being 2016 NPL Capital Football Grand Final, defeating Canberra FC 3-0 at Deakin Stadium in front of 2,782 people.

In 1980, as Downer Olympic, the club won their closest premiership ahead of Croatia Deakin (now Canberra FC) by one goal. After 21 games both clubs finished on 32 points and had scored 53 goals with Olympic claiming the title on the back of their superior defence with the side conceding only 16 goals compared to Deakin's 17.

Canberra Olympic have succeeded in winning the premiership and championship 'double' three times in the club's history in 1993 1994 and 2016. In 1993, Olympic won the premiership by three points ahead of Southern Cross while they beat the same opposition in the grand final on penalties 8-7. In 1994, Olympic finished first in the league ahead of Tuggeranong United while they beat Tuggers in the grand final 3-1.

In 2016, Canberra Olympic won the premiership by three points ahead of Cooma FC, while they beat Canberra FC 3-0 in the Grand Final.

On 18 June 2016, Canberra Olympic qualified for their first FFA Cup with a 3-1 victory over Cooma FC in the 2016 ACT Federation Cup final, played at Deakin Stadium.

Canberra Olympic advanced to the 2016 FFA Cup semi finals as the last remaining NPL club in the cup that year, before being defeated by A-League side Sydney FC 3-0 at Viking Park in front of a ground record 5,581 crowd. On the way to the semi-finals Olympic advanced past Surfers Paradise Apollo SC 1-0 (round 32), Redlands United FC 2-0 (round 16) and Green Gully SC 1-0 (quarter finals) at Deakin Stadium.

In 2017, Canberra Olympic won the premiership by 11 points ahead of the FFA Centre of Excellence, only losing one game during the regular season.

In 2017, Canberra Olympic qualified for their second successive FFA Cup with victory over Tuggeranong FC in the 2017 ACT Federation Cup final, played at Deakin Stadium.

Canberra Olympic lost their 2017 FFA Cup Round of 32 play off to Sorrento FC in Perth 1-0.

In 2025 the Canberra Olympic FC First Grade Mens side won the CPL Mens Grand Final defeating ANUFC.

2026 has seen the club grow in size as it has taken on a large number of players from the Gungahlin area as part of its entry into the Community League.

== Club identity ==
=== Colours and crest ===
Olympic's primary colours of blue and white reflect the club's Greek heritage as it shares the colours of the Greek national flag. Olympics alternative colours are red and white. The club's crest is a traditional shield of white with a blue trim encompassing the club's name, location and the Olympic torch and olive wreath.

=== Club name ===
The club was founded as Olympic Soccer Club in 1956 by the local Greek community which settled in Canberra. in 1973 the club changed its name to Downer Olympic before changing it back to simply Olympic in 1991. Finally, in 1997 the club changed its name to Canberra Olympic, which it has retained as its name since that point.

Club Name Changes
#	Name	From	To
1	Olympic	1956	1972
2	Downer Olympic	1973	1990
3	Olympic	1991	1996
4	Canberra Olympic	1997	Current

== Current squad ==
As of 12 October 2026

Note: Flags indicate national team as defined under FIFA eligibility rules; some limited exceptions apply. Players may hold more than one non-FIFA nationality.

No.	Pos.	Nation	Player
1	GK	AUS	Adam Stevens
2	GK	AUS	Beau Babyack
3	DF	AUS	Charlie Triggs
4	DF	AUS	Connor Bill
7	MF	AUS	David Ikoro
9	FW	AUS	Mate Barisic
10	DF	AUS	George Timotheou
11	FW	AUS	Ethan Schneider
14	MF	AUS	Nikita Byrnes
15	MF	AUS	Eleftherios Papoutsis

No.	Pos.	Nation	Player
16	DF	AUS	Ollie Wiedekher
17	MF	AUS	Xavi Bonnett
18	DF	AUS	Christian Kreskas
20	DF	AUS	Bernard Rene
21	MF	AUS	David Joseph
24	DF	AUS	Charlie D'Addario
35	MF	AUS	Luca Florez
40	DF	AUS	Nicholas Mamatas
45	FW	AUS	Nikos Kalfas
98	MF	AUS	Seth Bonnett

== Coaching staff ==
All the Canberra Olympic NPL men's and women's team staff for the 2026 season.

As of 26 January 2026

Men
Position	Name
Head coach	(Australia) Eric Bonnett
Assistant coach	(Australia) Dejan Santrac

Women
Position	Name
Head coach	(Australia) Victor Yanes
Assistant coach	(Australia) Matthew Cachia

== Honours ==
- ACT League Premiers and Finals Champions
  - Premiers (7): 1975, 1980, 1993, 1994, 2006, 2016, 2017
  - Champions (6): 1958, 1993, 1994, 1997, 2013, 2015, 2016
- Capital Football Federation Cup
  - Winners (6): 1979, 1981, 1983, 1997, 1999, 2016, 2017

== Season-by-season results ==
Champions	Runners-up	Third Place

Canberra Olympic Season-by-Season Results
Season	National Premier League ACT										NPL Finals	Fed Cup	FFA Cup	Top scorer	
Season	GP	W	D	L	GF	GA	GD	PTS	League	Finals	NPL Finals	Fed Cup	FFA Cup	Name	Goals
2013	23	13	6	4	47	25	+22	45	3rd	Champions	-	QF	-	Mark Shields	19
2014	16	8	3	5	41	28	+13	27	3rd	Semi-final	-	SF	-	Mark Shields	15
2015	16	7	4	5	38	21	+17	25	5th	Champions	-	QF	-	Philippe Bernabo-Madrid	10
2016	18	15	0	3	50	16	+34	45	Premiers	Champions	QF	W	SF	Philippe Bernabo-Madrid	10
2017	18	15	2	1	66	22	+44	47	Premiers	Runner-up	QF	W	R32	Stephen Domenici	28
2018	16	11	0	5	40	21	+19	33	2nd	Runner-up	-	QF	-	Michael John	12
