= 2019 FFA Cup preliminary rounds =

Qualification rounds for 2019 season of Australian soccer competition

Tournament details
- Country: Australia
- Teams: 736

The 2019 FFA Cup preliminary rounds were the qualifying competition to decide 21 of the 32 teams to take part in the 2019 FFA Cup Round of 32, along with the 10 A-League clubs and reigning National Premier Leagues champion, Campbelltown City. The preliminary rounds operated within a consistent national structure whereby club entry into the competition was staggered in each federation, with the winning clubs from Round 7 of the preliminary rounds in each member federation gaining entry into the Round of 32. All Australian clubs were eligible to enter the qualifying process through their respective FFA member federation, however only one team per club was permitted entry in the competition.

== Schedule ==
The number of fixtures for each round, and the match dates for each Federation, were as follows.

Round	Number of fixtures	Clubs	ACT	NSW	NNSW	NT	QLD	SA	TAS	VIC	WA
First qualifying round	6 + 3 byes	736 → 730	–	–	–	–	–	–	–	9–10 Feb	–
Second qualifying round	28	730 → 702	–	–	–	–	–	–	–	16–17 Feb	–
First round	51 + 1 bye	702 → 651	–	–	–	–	–	–	–	23–25 Feb	9–10 Mar
Second round	118 + 148 byes	651 → 533	–	12–19 Mar	23 Feb–20 Mar	–	1–16 Mar	29–31 Mar	–	28 Feb–4 Mar	23–24 Mar
Third round	190 + 10 byes	533 → 344	12–17 Mar	16 Mar–10 Apr	9 Mar–9 Apr	–	9 Mar–27 Apr	18–22 Apr	11 Mar	7–11 Mar	6–7 Apr
Fourth round	166 + 1 bye	344 → 178	30 Mar–10 Apr	9 Apr–1 May	30 Mar–9 May	27 Mar–17 Apr	16 Mar–16 May	3–5 May	9–20 Apr	17–20 Apr	22 Apr
Fifth round	83 + 1 bye	178 → 95	8 May	24 Apr–8 May	2–22 May	7–21 May	17 Apr–20 May	21–22 May	11–12 May	30 Apr–8 May	18–30 May
Sixth round	42	95 → 53	29 May	15–22 May	8 Jun	4–15 Jun	14–28 May	4–5 Jun	25–26 May	22–29 May	3 Jun
Seventh round	21	53 → 32	15 Jun	5 Jun	11–12 Jun	25 Jun	7–8 Jun	22 Jun	10 Jun	11–19 Jun	15–16 Jun

- Some round dates in respective Federations overlap due to separate scheduling of zones.

== Format ==
The preliminary rounds structures were as follows, and refer to the different levels in the unofficial Australian soccer league system:

- First qualifying round:

- 15 Victorian clubs level 9 and below entered this stage.

- Second qualifying round:

- 56 Victorian clubs (9 from the previous round and 47 level 8) entered this stage.

- First round:

- 9 Queensland clubs level 4 entered this stage.
- 88 Victorian clubs (28 from the previous round and 60 level 6–7) entered this stage.
- 6 Western Australian clubs (Regional and Masters) entered this stage.

- Second round:

- 96 New South Wales clubs (Association teams, level 6 and below) entered this stage.
- 54 Northern New South Wales clubs level 4 and below entered this stage.
- 81 Queensland clubs (5 from the previous round and 76 level 4 and below) entered this stage.
- 54 South Australian clubs level 2 and below entered this stage.
- 80 Victorian clubs (40 from the previous round and 36 level 5–6) entered this stage.
- 19 Western Australian clubs (3 from the previous round and 16 level 5 and below) entered this stage.

- Third round:

- 8 Australian Capital Territory clubs level 3 and below entered this stage.
- 114 New South Wales clubs (89 from the previous round and 25 level 4–5) entered this stage.
- 43 Northern New South Wales clubs (32 from the previous round and 11 level 3) entered this stage.
- 78 Queensland clubs (58 from the previous round and 20 level 2 and below) entered this stage.
- 32 South Australian clubs progressed to this stage.
- 13 Tasmanian clubs (level 3) entered this stage.
- 64 Victorian clubs (40 from the previous round and 24 level 4) entered this stage.
- 38 Western Australian clubs (15 from the previous round and 23 level 3–4) entered this stage.

- Fourth round:

- 16 Australian Capital Territory clubs (4 from the previous round and 12 level 2–3) entered this stage.
- 80 New South Wales clubs (57 from the previous round and 23 level 2–3) entered this stage.
- 32 Northern New South Wales clubs (22 from the previous round and 10 level 2) entered this stage.
- 13 Northern Territory clubs (9 from the Darwin zone and 4 from the Alice Springs zone; level 2 and below) entered this stage.
- 64 Queensland clubs (41 from the previous round and 23 level 2–3) entered this stage.
- 16 South Australian clubs progressed to this stage.
- 16 Tasmanian clubs (7 from the previous round and 9 level 2) entered this stage.
- 64 Victorian clubs (32 from the previous round and 32 level 2–3) entered this stage.
- 32 Western Australian clubs (21 from the previous round and 11 level 2) entered this stage.

- Fifth round:

- 8 Australian Capital Territory clubs progressed to this stage.
- 40 New South Wales clubs progressed to this stage.
- 16 Northern New South Wales clubs progressed to this stage.
- 7 Northern Territory clubs (5 from the Darwin zone, and 2 from the Alice Springs zone) progressed to this stage.
- 32 Queensland clubs progressed to this stage; 8 from Central and North Queensland, and 24 from South East Queensland.
- 8 South Australian clubs progressed to this stage.
- 8 Tasmanian clubs progressed to this stage.
- 32 Victorian clubs progressed to this stage.
- 16 Western Australian clubs progressed to this stage.

- Sixth round:

- 4 Australian Capital Territory clubs progressed to this stage.
- 20 New South Wales progressed to this stage.
- 8 Northern New South Wales clubs progressed to this stage.
- 4 Northern Territory clubs (3 from the Darwin zone, and the winner of the Alice Springs zone) progressed to this stage.
- 16 Queensland clubs progressed to this stage; 4 from Central and North Queensland, and 12 from South East Queensland.
- 4 South Australian clubs progressed to this stage.
- 4 Tasmanian clubs progressed to this stage.
- 16 Victorian clubs progressed to this stage.
- 8 Western Australian clubs progressed to this stage.

- Seventh round:

- 2 Australian Capital Territory clubs progressed to this stage, which doubled as the Final of the Federation Cup.
- 10 New South Wales clubs progressed to this stage. The 5 winners also participated in the final rounds of the Waratah Cup.
- 4 Northern New South Wales clubs progressed to this stage.
- 2 Northern Territory clubs progressed to this stage, which doubled as the final of the Sport Minister's Cup.
- 8 Queensland clubs progressed to this stage; 2 from Central and North Queensland, and 6 from South East Queensland.
- 2 South Australian clubs progressed to this stage, which doubled as the Grand Final of the Federation Cup.
- 2 Tasmanian clubs progressed to this stage, which doubled as the Grand Final of the Milan Lakoseljac Cup.
- 8 Victorian clubs progressed to this stage. The 4 winners also qualified to the final rounds of the Dockerty Cup.
- 4 Western Australian clubs progressed to this stage. The 2 winners also participated in the Final of the Football West State Cup.

=== Other qualification issues ===
- A-League Youth teams playing in their respective federation leagues were specifically excluded from the preliminary rounds as their respective Senior A-League clubs were already part of the competition.
- Campbelltown City did not participate in the South Australian qualifying rounds, as they had already qualified for the FFA Cup as 2018 National Premier Leagues champions.

== Key to abbreviations ==
Federation	Zone
ACT = Australian Capital Territory	
NSW = New South Wales	
NNSW = Northern New South Wales	NTH = North; STH = South
NT = Northern Territory	ASP = Alice Springs; DAR = Darwin
QLD = Queensland	CQ = Central Queensland; FNQ = Far North Queensland; MR = Mackay Region; NQ = North Queensland; SEQ = South East Queensland; WB = Wide Bay
SA = South Australia	
TAS = Tasmania	
VIC = Victoria	
WA = Western Australia	

== First qualifying round ==
Fed	Zone	Tie no	Home team (Tier)	Score	Away team (Tier)
Victoria
VIC	–	1	Forest Rangers (9)	1–4	Myrtleford Savoy (9)
VIC	–	2	Churchill United (9)	1–2	Falcons 2000 (9)
VIC	–	3	Monash SC (9)	w/o	Warrnambool Wolves (9)

Fed	Zone	Tie no	Home team (Tier)	Score	Away team (Tier)
VIC	–	4	Tatura SC (9)	10–1	Broadmeadows Stars (12)
VIC	–	5	Tullamarine (9)	4–0	Warrnambool Rangers (9)
VIC	–	6	Ballarat North United (10)	4–1	Glen Eira FC (12)

Notes

- w/o = Walkover
- VIC Byes – Castlemaine Goldfields (10), Twin City Wanderers (9), Wangaratta City (9).

== Second qualifying round ==
Fed	Zone	Tie no	Home team (Tier)	Score	Away team (Tier)
Victoria
VIC	–	1	Tullamarine (9)	3–0	Lara United (8)
VIC	–	2	RMIT FC (8)	w/o	Aspendale (8)
VIC	–	3	Maidstone United (8)	w/o	Glen Waverley (8)
VIC	–	4	Mount Waverley City (8)	4–0	Thomastown Raiders (8)
VIC	–	5	Uni Hill Eagles (8)	6–3	Mount Lilydale Old Collegians (8)
VIC	–	6	St Kevin's Old Boys (8)	w/o	Endeavour Hills Fire (8)
VIC	–	7	Tatura SC (9)	2–3	Bundoora United (8)
VIC	–	8	Pakenham United (8)	2–3	Casey Panthers (8)
VIC	–	9	Old Mentonians (8)	w/o	West Point (8)
VIC	–	10	Balmoral (8)	1–3	Hampton Park United Sparrows (8)
VIC	–	11	Falcons 2000 (9)	2–2†	Moonee Valley Knights (8)
Moonee Valley Knights advance 5–4 on penalties.
VIC	–	12	Boronia SC (8)	2–2†	Glenroy Lions (8)
Boronia SC advance 3–2 on penalties.
VIC	–	13	Knox United (8)	w/o	Maribyrnong Greens (8)

Fed	Zone	Tie no	Home team (Tier)	Score	Away team (Tier)
VIC	–	14	Old Trinity Grammarians (8)	4–4†	Old Ivanhoe Grammarians (8)
Old Ivanhoe Grammarians advance 4–2 on penalties.
VIC	–	15	Ballarat SC (8)	1–0	Deakin Ducks (8)
VIC	–	16	Castlemaine Goldfields (10)	2–3	Monash SC (9)
VIC	–	17	Keilor Wolves (8)	w/o	Wyndham United (8)
VIC	–	18	Barwon (8)	w/o	Melbourne Lions (8)
VIC	–	19	Somerville Eagles (8)	3–1	Barnstoneworth United (8)
VIC	–	20	Twin City Wanderers (9)	4–0	East Kew (8)
VIC	–	21	Albert Park (8)	2–0	Myrtleford Savoy (9)
VIC	–	22	Waverley Wanderers (8)	3–1	Ballarat North United (10)
VIC	–	23	White Star Dandenong (8)	3–3†	Melton Phoenix (8)
White Star Dandenong advance 6–5 on penalties.
VIC	–	24	Alphington (8)	1–2	Reservoir Yeti (8)
VIC	–	25	Morwell Pegasus (8)	w/o	Wangaratta City (9)
VIC	–	26	Mitchell Rangers (8)	0–5	Meadow Park (8)
VIC	–	27	Keon Park (8)	0–3	Bunyip District (8)
VIC	–	28	Rosebud (8)	1–3	Yarra Jets (8)

Notes

- w/o = Walkover
- † = After Extra Time

== First round ==
Fed	Zone	Tie no	Home team (Tier)	Score	Away team (Tier)
Queensland
QLD	WB	1	Tinana (5)	1–11	Sunbury Blues (4)
QLD	WB	2	Alloway (5)	0–1	Brothers Aston Villa (4)
QLD	WB	3	KSS Jets (4)	8–0	Doon Villa (4)
QLD	WB	4	Buccaneers FC (4)	1–6	United Park Eagles (4)
Victoria
VIC	–	5	Middle Park (6)	0–3	Truganina Hornets (7)
VIC	–	6	Watsonia Heights (7)	1–2	Somerville Eagles (8)
VIC	–	7	Greenvale United (7)	3–6	Boronia (8)
VIC	–	8	East Bentleigh (7)	4–5†	Waverley Wanderers (8)
VIC	–	9	Heidelberg Eagles (7)	5–1	Sandringham (7)
VIC	–	10	Elwood City (6)	2–4	Sandown Lions (7)
VIC	–	11	Old Ivanhoe Grammarians (8)	3–1	Meadow Park (8)
VIC	–	12	Old Xaverians (7)	5–0	Marcellin Old Collegians (7)
VIC	–	13	Aspendale (8)	5–0	Monash SC (9)
VIC	–	14	Riversdale SC (7)	3–0	Albert Park (8)
VIC	–	15	East Brighton United (7)	3–0	La Trobe University (7)
VIC	–	16	Fawkner SC (6)	10–0	St Kevin's Old Boys (8)
VIC	–	17	Melbourne City SC (7)	w/o	Essendon United (6)
VIC	–	18	Ashburton United (6)	1–0	Ringwood City (7)
VIC	–	19	Croydon City Arrows (7)	1–3	Northern Falcons (7)
VIC	–	20	Wangaratta City (9)	w/o	Lyndale United (7)
VIC	–	21	Thornbury Athletic (7)	2–1	Westside Strikers (7)
VIC	–	22	Bell Park (7)	8–3	Noble Park United (7)
VIC	–	23	Tullamarine (9)	1–2	Point Cook (6)
VIC	–	24	Melbourne University (7)	6–0	Mount Waverley City (8)
VIC	–	25	Chisholm United (7)	2–1	Yarra Jets (8)
VIC	–	26	Reservoir Yeti (8)	1–3	Seaford United (7)
VIC	–	27	Twin City Wanderers (9)	0–6	Monash City (7)

Fed	Zone	Tie no	Home team (Tier)	Score	Away team (Tier)
VIC	–	28	Keysborough SC (7)	w/o	Spring Hills (7).
VIC	–	29	Barwon (8)	3–7	North Melbourne Athletic (7)
VIC	–	30	Ballarat SC (8)	2–1	Noble Hurricanes (7)
VIC	–	31	Old Camberwell Grammarians (7)	1–2†	West Point (8)
VIC	–	32	White Star Dandenong (8)	3–1	Darebin United (7)
VIC	–	33	Lalor United (6)	2–0	Western Eagles (6)
VIC	–	34	Baxter SC (7)	3–2†	Altona North (7)
VIC	–	35	Uni Hill Eagles (8)	5–4†	Keilor Wolves (8)
VIC	–	36	Brunswick Zebras (7)	0–1	Plenty Valley Lions (7)
VIC	–	37	Moonee Valley Knights (8)	2–1	Golden Plains (7)
VIC	–	38	Hampton Park United Sparrows (8)	6–1	Casey Panthers (8)
VIC	–	39	Gisborne SC (7)	2–3	Springvale City (7)
VIC	–	40	Laverton FC (7)	0–4	Kings Domain (7)
VIC	–	41	Noble Park (7)	w/o	West Preston (7)
VIC	–	42	Dandenong South (7)	4–5†	Craigieburn City (6)
VIC	–	43	Monash University (6)	0–3	Bundoora United (8)
VIC	–	44	Dingley Stars (7)	1–2	Knox United (8)
VIC	–	45	Chelsea FC (7)	1–2	Upfield (6)
VIC	–	46	Endeavour United (7)	3–0	Bunyip District (8)
VIC	–	47	Dandenong Warriors (7)	0–0†	Surf Coast (7)
Surf Coast advance 9–8 on penalties.
VIC	–	48	Whitehorse United (6)	6–1	Glen Waverley (8)
Western Australia
WA	–	49	Albany Rovers (-)	0–3	Albany Caledonian (-)
WA	–	50	Bunbury Dynamos (-)	w/o	Manning United Seniors (-)
WA	–	51	Polonia FC (-)	w/o	Busselton City (-)

Notes

- w/o = Walkover
- † = After Extra Time
- QLD Byes – Across The Waves (4).

== Second round ==
Fed	Zone	Tie no	Home team (Tier)	Score	Away team (Tier)
New South Wales
NSW	–	1	University of Wollongong (7)	4–3	Leeton United (6)
NSW	–	2	Berkeley Vale (6)	2–1	Holroyd Rangers (6)
NSW	–	3	Fairfield Bulls (6)	0–3	Wollongong United (6)
NSW	–	4	Bankstown RSL Dragons (7)	1–7	Fernhill FC (6)
NSW	–	5	Shoalhaven United (6)	4–1	Yerrinbool Bargo (6)
NSW	–	6	Penrith Rovers (6)	2–4†	Dee Why (6)
NSW	–	7	Woongarrah Wildcats (6)	5–0	Macquarie University (7)
Northern New South Wales
NNSW	NTH	8	Port United (4)	3–0	Northern Storm Thunder (4)
NNSW	NTH	9	Westlawn Tigers (4)	9–0	Taree Wildcats (4)
NNSW	NTH	10	Port Saints (4)	1–0	Alstonville (4)
NNSW	NTH	11	Demon Knights (4)	5–2	Moree Services (5)
NNSW	NTH	12	East Armidale United (4)	0–5	Goonellabah FC (4)
NNSW	NTH	13	South Armidale United (4)	6–1	Narrabri FC (5)
NNSW	NTH	14	Boambee Bombers (4)	4–0	Maclean FC (4)
NNSW	NTH	15	Coffs City United (4)	w/o	Quirindi FC (5)
NNSW	NTH	16	Coffs Coast Tigers (4)	5–0	Gunnedah FC (5)
NNSW	NTH	17	Oxley Vale Attunga (4)	w/o	Urunga FC (4)
NNSW	STH	18	Maitland Junior FC (7)	1–7	Nelson Bay (6)
NNSW	STH	19	Bolwarra Lorn (6)	1–1	Mayfield United Junior (7)
Mayfield United Junior advance 4–2 on penalties.
NNSW	STH	20	Merewether Advance (6)	1–2	Jesmond FC (5)
NNSW	STH	21	Newcastle Suns (4)	2–5	Dudley Redhead United Senior (4)
NNSW	STH	22	Hamilton Azzurri (5)	3–2	Garden Suburb (5)
NNSW	STH	23	Beresfield United Senior (4)	7–0	Minmi Wanderers (7)
NNSW	STH	24	Stockton Sharks (5)	w/o	Morisset United (6)
NNSW	STH	25	Greta Branxton (7)	4–5	Hunter Simba (6)
NNSW	STH	26	Charlestown Junior (7)	0–5	Warners Bay (4)
NNSW	STH	27	Kotara South (4)	w/o	Westlakes Wildcats (5)
NNSW	STH	28	West Wallsend Junior (7)	4–2	Kurri Kurri Junior (7)
NNSW	STH	29	Dudley Redhead United (4)	0–6	Barnsley United (4)
Queensland
QLD	CQ	30	Nerimbera (4)	0–3	Capricorn Coast (4)
QLD	WB	31	Across The Waves (4)	2–3†	Brothers Aston Villa (4)
QLD	SEQ	32	Newmarket (6)	1–8	Brisbane Athletic (6)
QLD	SEQ	33	Bethania Rams (7)	3–2	The Gap (4)
QLD	SEQ	34	Nambour Yandina United (4)	7–3	Buderim Wanderers (4)
QLD	SEQ	35	Surfers Paradise Apollo (4)	6–1	Kingscliff Wolves (5)
QLD	SEQ	36	Toowong (4)	7–1	North Brisbane (6)
QLD	SEQ	37	Albany Creek (4)	6–1	Oxley United (6)
QLD	SEQ	38	Coomera Colts (4)	4–0	Virginia United (5)
QLD	SEQ	39	Kangaroo Point Rovers (6)	2–2†	Broadbeach United (4)
Kangaroo Point Rovers advance 5–3 on penalties.
QLD	SEQ	40	Taringa Rovers (4)	2–1	Woombye Snakes (4)
QLD	SEQ	41	Pine Hills (5)	3–5	Springfield United (7)
QLD	SEQ	42	Redcliffe PCYC (7)	0–9	Samford Rangers (5)
QLD	SEQ	43	Gatton (4)	1–5	Willowburn (4)
QLD	SEQ	44	Teviot Downs (7)	0–31	Bayside United (4)
QLD	SEQ	45	North Pine (4)	0–5	Grange Thistle (4)
QLD	SEQ	46	Robina City (5)	6–3	Logan Roos (7)
QLD	SEQ	47	Annerley (5)	8–0	Logan Village (7)
QLD	SEQ	48	Ipswich City (5)	w/o	West Wanderers (4)
QLD	SEQ	49	Tarragindi Tigers (6)	1–7	Moggill (5)
QLD	SEQ	50	Ripley Valley (7)	0–7	Mt Gravatt Hawks (5)
QLD	SEQ	51	Clairvaux (6)	4–0	St. George Willawong (5)
QLD	SEQ	52	Nerang (4)	4–4†	Burleigh Heads Bulldogs (4)
Burleigh Heads Bulldogs advance 5–3 on penalties.
South Australia
SA	–	53	Northern Demons (4)	0–3	Cumberland United (3)
SA	–	54	Tea Tree Gully City (5)	1–0	West Adelaide (2)
SA	–	55	The Cove (3)	1–0	Eastern United (4)
SA	–	56	Rostrevor Old Collegians (5)	1–1†	BOSA SC (5)
Rostrevor Old Collegians advance 7–6 on penalties.

Fed	Zone	Tie no	Home team (Tier)	Score	Away team (Tier)
SA	–	57	Seaford Rangers (3)	1–6	Playford City (4)
SA	–	58	Adelaide Red Blue Eagles (5)	2–3	Noarlunga United (3)
SA	–	59	Adelaide Cobras Amateurs (5)	0–11	Elizabeth Downs (5)
SA	–	60	Salisbury United (3)	3–1	USC Lion (5)
SA	–	61	Mount Barker United (4)	2–4	Ghan Kilburn City (5)
SA	–	62	Adelaide Victory (4)	2–1	Fulham United (3)
SA	–	63	Brahma Lodge (5)	3–2†	Adelaide Wanderers (5)
SA	–	64	Modbury Jets (3)	4–2	Adelaide Cobras (4)
SA	–	65	Elizabeth Vale (5)	4–2	Adelaide Titans (5)
SA	–	66	Noarlunga Amateurs (6)	2–5	Adelaide Hills Hawks (4)
SA	–	67	Western Strikers (3)	1–2	White City (3)
SA	–	68	West Torrens Birkalla (3)	0–1	Port Adelaide Pirates (4)
SA	–	69	Pontian Eagles (5)	3–2	Mercedes Old Collegians (5)
SA	–	70	Cardijn Old Collegians (6)	2–4	Adelaide Vipers (4)
SA	–	71	Adelaide University (4)	3–2	Modbury Vista (4)
SA	–	72	Adelaide University Graduates (5)	4–1	UniSA FC (4)
SA	–	73	Sturt Lions (3)	2–1	Gawler Eagles (4)
SA	–	74	Old Ignatians (5)	2–1†	Sacred Heart Old Collegians (5)
Victoria
VIC	–	75	Heatherton United (5)	w/o	Boroondara-Carey Eagles (5)
VIC	–	76	Old Scotch (5)	1–0†	Diamond Valley United (6)
VIC	–	77	Peninsula Strikers (5)	4–1	Baxter (7)
VIC	–	78	Knox City (5)	2–3	Bayside Argonauts (6)
VIC	–	79	Lalor United (6)	2–1	Endeavour United (7)
VIC	–	80	Northern Falcons (7)	3–4†	West Preston (7)
VIC	–	81	Westvale SC (6)	w/o	East Brighton United (7)
VIC	–	82	Melbourne University (7)	5–1	Knox United (8)
VIC	–	83	Essendon United (6)	3–2	Whitehorse United (6)
VIC	–	84	Ballarat SC (8)	1–0	Old Xaverians (7)
VIC	–	85	Collingwood City (6)	2–1	Geelong Rangers (5)
VIC	–	86	Westgate (5)	7–1	Spring Hills (7)
VIC	–	87	Berwick City (5)	2–2†	North Caulfield (5)
Berwick City advance 7–6 on penalties.
VIC	–	88	Fawkner (6)	5–3	Plenty Valley Lions (7)
VIC	–	89	Riversdale (7)	0–2	Point Cook (6)
VIC	–	90	Bell Park (7)	2–4	Springvale City (7)
VIC	–	91	Mooroolbark (5)	2–1†	Seaford United (7)
VIC	–	92	Kings Domain (7)	1–0	West Point (8)
VIC	–	93	Albion Rovers (5)	3–0	Western Suburbs (5)
VIC	–	94	Moonee Valley Knights (8)	3–1	Boronia (8)
VIC	–	95	Surf Coast (7)	0–4	Sandown Lions (7)
VIC	–	96	South Springvale (5)	4–2	Sunbury United (6)
VIC	–	97	Aspendale (8)	0–4	Moreland United (5)
VIC	–	98	Upfield (6)	1–0	Lyndale United (7)
VIC	–	99	Corio (5)	2–1	Chisholm United (7)
VIC	–	100	Monash City (7)	1–5	Fitzroy City (5)
VIC	–	101	North Melbourne Athletic (7)	2–1	Truganina Hornets (7)
VIC	–	102	Sebastopol Vikings (6)	2–0	White Star Dandenong (8)
VIC	–	103	South Yarra (6)	6–0	Somerville Eagles (8)
VIC	–	104	Thornbury Athletic (7)	3–2†	Frankston Pines (6)
VIC	–	105	Hume United (5)	2–1	Hoppers Crossing (5)
VIC	–	106	Altona East Phoenix (5)	1–4	Brighton (6)
VIC	–	107	Waverley Wanderers (8)	3–1†	Hampton Park United Sparrows (8)
VIC	–	108	Strathmore (6)	4–2	Doncaster Rivers (5)
VIC	–	109	Skye United (6)	4–3	Monbulk Rangers (5)
VIC	–	110	Craigieburn City (6)	0–1	Ashburton United (6)
VIC	–	111	Brandon Park (5)	4–1	Uni Hill Eagles (8)
VIC	–	112	Mill Park (5)	8–0	Old Ivanhoe Grammarians (8)
VIC	–	113	Williamstown (6)	3–3†	Heidelberg Eagles (7)
Williamstown advance 8–7 on penalties.
VIC	–	114	Epping City (5)	4–1	Bundoora United (8)
Western Australia
WA	–	115	Perth AFC (9)	1–2	East Perth (7)
WA	–	116	Wembley Downs (5)	0–4	Northern City (10)
WA	–	117	Perth Hills United (7)	0–5	Queen’s Park (6)
WA	–	118	Woodvale FC (8)	1–2	North Perth United (5)

Notes

- w/o = Walkover
- † = After Extra Time
- NSW Byes – Abbotsford Juniors (-), Albion Park City Razorbacks (-), Albion Park White Eagles (-), Ararat FC (-), Arncliffe Aurora (-), Balmain & District (-), Banksia Tigers (-), Bankstown Sports Strikers (-), Baulkham Hills (-), Blacktown Workers (-), Blue Mountains (-), Brookvale FC (-), Budgewoi FC (-), Bulli FC (-), Coledale Waves (-), Coniston FC (-), Coogee United (-), Cronulla Seagulls (-), Doyalson-Wyee (-), Emu Plains (-), Epping Eastwood (-), Epping FC (-), Forest Killarney (-), Gerringong Breakers (-), Gladesville Ravens Sports Club (-), Glenmore Park (-), Greenacre Eagles (-), Gwandalan Summerland Point (-), Gymea United (-), Harrington United (-), Hazelbrook FC (-), IFS Community Wolves (-), Kanwal Warnervale Rovers (-), Kariong United (-), Kellyville Colts (-), Kemps Creek United (-), Kenthurst & District (-), Killarney District (-), Kirrawee Kangaroos (-), Lilli Pilli (-), Lindfield FC (-), Lugarno FC (-), Macquarie Dragons (-), Manly Allambie United (-), Marayong FC (-), Menai Hawks (-), Moorebank Sports (-), North Rocks (-), North Sydney United (-), Norwest FC (-), Old Barker (-), Pagewood Botany (-), Peakhurst United (-), Pendle Hill (-), Pennant Hills (-), Pittwater RSL (-), Putney Rangers (-), Quakers Hill (-), Randwick City (-), Redbacks FC (-), Revesby Rovers (-), Revesby Workers (-), Rouse Hill Rams (-), Ryde Saints United (-), Southern & Ettalong (-), Strathfield FC (-), Sydney CBD (-), Sydney Dragon (-), Sydney Rangers (-), Tarrawanna Blueys (-), Terrigal United (-), The Ponds (-), Thornleigh Thunder (-), Umina United (-), Waverley Old Boys (-), West Pennant Hills Cherrybrook (-), West Ryde Rovers (-), Winston Hills (-), Wollongong Olympic (-), Woonona Sharks (-), Woy Woy (-), Wyoming FC (-).
- NNSW Byes – Armidale City Westside (4), Bangalow (4), Kempsey Saints (4), Lake Macquarie FC (-), Macleay Valley Rangers (4), Mayfield United Senior (-), Raymond Terrace (-), Swansea FC (–), Tamworth FC (4), Woolgoolga Wolves (4).
- QLD Byes – AC Carina (5), Acacia Ridge (4), Bardon Latrobe (6), Beerwah Glasshouse United (4), Bilambil Terramora (6), Bluebirds United (4), Brisbane Knights (4), Caboolture Sports (4), Caloundra (4), Centenary Stormers (4), Frenchville (4), Gympie United (4), Jimboomba United (7), Kawana (4), KSS Jets (4), Logan Metro (7), Maroochydore Swans (4), Mudgeeraba (4), New Farm United (5), Noosa Lions (4), North Lakes Mustangs (7), North Star (5), Palm Beach Sharks (4), Park Ridge (6), Ridge Hills (7), Rockville Rovers (4), Slacks Creek (6), Southport (5), Southside United (4), Sunbury Blues (4), The Lakes (6), United Park Eagles (4), UQFC (4), Western Spirit (5), Westside (6).
- SA Byes – Adelaide Blue Eagles (2), Adelaide City (2), Adelaide Comets (2), Adelaide Olympic (2), Adelaide Raiders (2), Campbelltown City (2), Croydon Kings (2), North Eastern MetroStars (2), Para Hills Knights (2), South Adelaide (2).
- WA Byes – Albany Caledonian (-), BrOzzy Sports Club (9), Bunbury Dynamos (-), Maccabi SC (8), Mindarie FC (12), North Beach (7), Polonia FC (-), Port Kennedy (6), Westnam United (7), Warnbro Strikers SC (6), Yanchep United (8).

== Third round ==
Fed	Zone	Tie no	Home team (Tier)	Score	Away team (Tier)
Australian Capital Territory
ACT	–	1	Brindabella Blues (3)	4–3†	Narrabundah FC (3)
ACT	–	2	Southern Tablelands United (3)	0–2	UC Pumas (4)
ACT	–	3	Weston-Molonglo (3)	4–1	Canberra City (4)
ACT	–	4	Wagga City Wanderers (3)	2–5	White Eagles (3)
New South Wales
NSW	–	5	North Rocks (6)	0–4	Western NSW Mariners (4)
NSW	–	6	Coogee United (6)	5–0	Lilli Pilli (6)
NSW	–	7	Marayong FC (6)	1–7	Berkeley Vale (6)
NSW	–	8	Norwest FC (6)	1–7	Western Condors (5)
NSW	–	9	Waverley Old Boys (6)	0–1	Bankstown United (4)
NSW	–	10	Redbacks FC (7)	1–9	Fraser Park (5)
NSW	–	11	Macquarie Dragons (7)	1–7	Dunbar Rovers (4)
NSW	–	12	Kenthurst & District (6)	0–2	Gladesville Ryde Magic (4)
NSW	–	13	Pendle Hill (6)	0–9	Bankstown City (4)
NSW	–	14	Baulkham Hills (6)	1–3	Hurstville City (5)
NSW	–	15	Kemps Creek United (6)	4–1	Revesby Rovers (8)
NSW	–	16	Sydney Rangers (7)	1–6	Hurstville City Minotaurs (5)
NSW	–	17	Woy Woy (7)	1–2	Gerringong Breakers (6)
NSW	–	18	IFS Community Wolves (9)	0–7	Stanmore Hawks (4)
NSW	–	19	Quakers Hill Junior (6)	1–2	Banksia Tigers (6)
NSW	–	20	Coledale Waves (8)	3–1	Budgewoi FC (7)
NSW	–	21	South Coast Flame (5)	2–1	Fernhill FC (6)
NSW	–	22	Rouse Hill Rams (6)	0–1	Thornleigh Thunder (7)
NSW	–	23	Revesby Workers (6)	0–2	The Ponds (6)
NSW	–	24	Wollongong United (6)	5–0	Old Barker (6)
NSW	–	25	Manly Allambie United (7)	4–2	Greenacre Eagles (7)
NSW	–	26	Dulwich Hill (4)	4–0	Woongarrah Wildcats (6)
NSW	–	27	Umina United (7)	2–1	Epping Eastwood (6)
NSW	–	28	Kanwal Warnervale Rovers (6)	0–4	UNSW (5)
NSW	–	29	Sydney University (4)	6–2	Harrington United (6)
NSW	–	30	Dee Why (6)	1–0	Balmain Tigers (5)
NSW	–	31	Abbotsford Juniors (6)	3–2	Southern & Ettalong (6)
NSW	–	32	Kellyville Colts (6)	1–2	Nepean FC (5)
NSW	–	33	Bankstown Sports Strikers (6)	2–1	Moorebank Sports (7)
NSW	–	34	Cronulla Seagulls (6)	4–3	Prospect United (5)
NSW	–	35	West Pennant Hills Cherrybrook (6)	4–2	Granville Rage (4)
NSW	–	36	Camden Tigers (4)	3–1	Brookvale FC (6)
NSW	–	37	Ryde Saints United (7)	2–0†	Sydney Dragons (7)
NSW	–	38	Wollongong Olympic (6)	5–3	Randwick City (6)
NSW	–	39	Menai Hawks (6)	0–1	Putney Rangers (7)
NSW	–	40	Winston Hills (6)	1–4	Pittwater RSL (6)
NSW	–	41	Albion Park City Razorbacks (8)	0–6	Coniston FC (6)
NSW	–	42	Balmain & District (6)	1–5	Forest Killarney (7)
NSW	–	43	Blacktown Workers (6)	1–3	Woonona Sharks (6)
NSW	–	44	Blue Mountains (6)	3–1†	Glenmore Park (6)
NSW	–	45	Pagewood Botany (6)	1–3	Terrigal United (6)
NSW	–	46	Lindfield FC (6)	2–0	Kariong United (7)
NSW	–	47	Gymea United (6)	1–3	West Ryde Rovers (6)
NSW	–	48	Pennant Hills (6)	13–0	Doyalson-Wyee (7)
NSW	–	49	Wyoming FC (6)	1–5	Bulli FC (6)
NSW	–	50	Tarrawanna Blueys (6)	7–0	North Sydney United (6)
NSW	–	51	Lugarno FC (7)	2–1	Peakhurst United (7)
NSW	–	52	Hazelbrook FC (6)	2–1	Central Coast United (5)
NSW	–	53	Arncliffe Aurora (6)	1–2	Sydney CBD (6)
NSW	–	54	Killarney District (6)	3–2	Albion Park White Eagles (6)
NSW	–	55	University of Wollongong (7)	4–1	Gladesville Ravens Sports Club (6)
NSW	–	56	Parramatta FC (4)	1–2	SD Raiders (4)
NSW	–	57	Strathfield FC (6)	2–5	Inter Lions (4)
NSW	–	58	Kirrawee Kangaroos (6)	2–1	FC Gazy Auburn (5)
NSW	–	59	Gwandalan Summerland Point (7)	2–1	Shoalhaven United (7)
NSW	–	60	Hawkesbury City (4)	10–0	Ararat FC (7)
NSW	–	61	Emu Plains (6)	0–2	Epping FC (6)
Northern New South Wales
NNSW	NTH	62	Goonellabah FC (4)	6–1	Westlawn Tigers (4)
NNSW	NTH	63	Coffs City United (4)	3–1	Port Saints (4)
NNSW	NTH	64	Woolgoolga Wolves (4)	6–1	Demon Knights (4)
NNSW	NTH	65	Oxley Vale Attunga (4)	1–6	Bangalow (4)
NNSW	NTH	66	Tamworth FC (4)	0–0†	South Armidale United (4)
South Armidale United advance 7–6 on penalties.
NNSW	NTH	67	Armidale City Westside (4)	0–9	Kempsey Saints (4)
NNSW	NTH	68	Port United (4)	1–1†	Boambee Bombers (4)
Boambee Bombers advance 3–0 on penalties.
NNSW	NTH	69	Macleay Valley Rangers (4)	1–2	Coffs Coast Tigers (4)
NNSW	STH	70	Thornton Redbacks (3)	0–2	Kahibah FC (3)
NNSW	STH	71	Jesmond FC (5)	3–5	Beresfield United Senior (4)
NNSW	STH	72	Swansea FC (4)	2–0	Stockton Sharks (5)
NNSW	STH	73	Mayfield United Senior (4)	1–3	West Wallsend (3)
NNSW	STH	74	Belmont Swansea United (3)	7–0	West Wallsend Junior (7)
NNSW	STH	75	Cessnock City Hornets (3)	6–0	Mayfield United Junior (7)
NNSW	STH	76	Nelson Bay (6)	2–2†	Singleton Strikers (3)
Nelson Bay advance 4–2 on penalties.
NNSW	STH	77	Lake Macquarie FC (3)	0–10	Cooks Hill United (3)
NNSW	STH	78	Barnsley United (4)	1–1†	Hamilton Azzurri (5)
Hamilton Azzurri advance 4–3 on penalties.
NNSW	STH	79	Toronto Awaba Stags (3)	5–1	Westlakes Wildcats (5)
NNSW	STH	80	New Lambton (3)	3–0	Wallsend FC (3)
NNSW	STH	81	Raymond Terrace (4)	1–3	Warners Bay (4)
NNSW	STH	82	Dudley Redhead United Senior (4)	8–0	Hunter Simba (6)
Queensland
QLD	CQ	83	Southside United (4)	2–3	Bluebirds United (4)
QLD	CQ	84	Capricorn Coast (4)	4–2	Frenchville (4)
QLD	FNQ	85	Marlin Coast Rangers (4)	2–3†	Stratford Dolphins (4)
QLD	FNQ	86	Innisfail United (4)	6–0	Douglas United (5)
QLD	FNQ	87	Mareeba United (4)	2–5	Leichhardt Lions (4)
QLD	FNQ	88	Southside Comets (4)	0–4	Edge Hill United (4)
QLD	MR	89	Mackay Wanderers (4)	2–0	Mackay Lions (4)
QLD	MR	90	Mackay Rangers (4)	4–2	Country United (4)
QLD	MR	91	Mackay City Brothers (4)	1–6	Mackay Magpies (4)
QLD	NQ	92	Brothers Townsville (4)	5–4†	Wulguru FC (4)
QLD	WB	93	Sunbury Blues (4)	3–0	Brothers Aston Villa (4)
QLD	WB	94	KSS Jets (4)	3–1	United Park Eagles (4)
QLD	SEQ	95	AC Carina (5)	6–4†	Ipswich City (5)
QLD	SEQ	96	Western Spirit (5)	1–2	Nambour Yandina United (4)
QLD	SEQ	97	Southport (5)	5–2	The Lakes (6)
QLD	SEQ	98	Ridge Hills United (7)	1–6	Noosa Lions (4)

Fed	Zone	Tie no	Home team (Tier)	Score	Away team (Tier)
QLD	SEQ	99	Toowong (4)	3–4†	Burleigh Heads Bulldogs (4)
QLD	SEQ	100	Rockville Rovers (4)	3–4	Samford Rangers (5)
QLD	SEQ	101	North Star (5)	2–0	Slacks Creek (6)
QLD	SEQ	102	Albany Creek (4)	9–0	Jimboomba United (7)
QLD	SEQ	103	Gympie United (4)	5–4	Westside Grovely (6).
QLD	SEQ	104	Bilambil Terramora (6)	1–5	Springfield United (7)
QLD	SEQ	105	Surfers Paradise Apollo (4)	9–1	Brisbane Knights (4)
QLD	SEQ	106	Centenary Stormers (4)	1–7	Robina City (5)
QLD	SEQ	107	Acacia Ridge (4)	0–3	Coomera Colts (4)
QLD	SEQ	108	Park Ridge (6)	0–8	Clairvaux (6)
QLD	SEQ	109	Annerley (5)	1–3	UQFC (4)
QLD	SEQ	110	Bardon Latrobe (6)	3–3†	Bethania Rams (7)
Bethania Rams advance 4–2 on penalties.
QLD	SEQ	111	Willowburn (4)	1–4	New Farm United (5)
QLD	SEQ	112	Moggill (5)	3–7	Kawana (4)
QLD	SEQ	113	Bayside United (4)	2–5	Grange Thistle (4)
QLD	SEQ	114	Caloundra (4)	1–3	Palm Beach Sharks (4)
QLD	SEQ	115	Maroochydore Swans (4)	11–0	North Lakes Mustangs (7)
QLD	SEQ	116	Taringa Rovers (4)	5–2	Beerwah Glasshouse United (-)
QLD	SEQ	117	Caboolture Sports (4)	4–0	Mudgeeraba (4)
QLD	SEQ	118	Kangaroo Point Rovers (6)	0–6	Brisbane Athletic (6)
QLD	SEQ	119	Logan Metro (7)	3–0	Mt Gravatt Hawks (5)
South Australia
SA	–	120	White City (3)	2–1	Adelaide University (4)
SA	–	121	Croydon Kings (2)	3–1†	The Cove (3)
SA	–	122	Port Adelaide Pirates (4)	1–6	Cumberland United (3)
SA	–	123	Adelaide Vipers (4)	4–1	Noarlunga United (3)
SA	–	124	Rostrevor Old Collegians (5)	1–2	Adelaide Blue Eagles (2)
SA	–	125	Adelaide Hills Hawks (4)	0–7	Adelaide Olympic (2)
SA	–	126	North Eastern MetroStars (2)	1–1†	Sturt Lions (3)
North Eastern MetroStars advance 5–4 on penalties.
SA	–	127	Pontian Eagles (5)	2–4	Adelaide Comets (2)
SA	–	128	Tea Tree Gully City (5)	0–4	Adelaide Raiders (2)
SA	–	129	Para Hills Knights (2)	2–0	Salisbury United (3)
SA	–	130	Campbelltown City (2)	1–1†	Adelaide City (2)
Adelaide City advance 4–2 on penalties.
SA	–	131	Adelaide University Graduates (5)	1–1†	Adelaide Victory (4)
Adelaide Victory advance 4–2 on penalties.
SA	–	132	Brahma Lodge (5)	1–2	Elizabeth Downs (5)
SA	–	133	South Adelaide (2)	6–0	Ghan Kilburn City (5)
SA	–	134	Playford City (4)	3–1	Modbury Jets (3)
SA	–	135	Old Ignatians (5)	2–5	Elizabeth Vale (5)
Tasmania
TAS	–	136	Metro FC (3)	10–2	Launceston United (3)
TAS	–	137	Burnie United (3)	1–4	Somerset (3)
TAS	–	138	New Town Eagles (3)	1–3	University of Tasmania (3)
TAS	–	139	North Launceston Eagles (3)	w/o	Taroona (3)
TAS	–	140	Nelson Eastern Suburbs (3)	7–0	South East United (3)
TAS	–	141	Beachside (3)	4–1	Ulverstone (3)
Victoria
VIC	–	142	Boroondara-Carey Eagles (5)	3–1	Moonee Valley Knights (8)
VIC	–	143	Westgate (5)	5–0	Ballarat SC (8)
VIC	–	144	Beaumaris (4)	2–1	Malvern City (4)
VIC	–	145	Epping City (5)	2–0	Hume United (5)
VIC	–	146	Warragul United (4)	3–1	Whittlesea United (4)
VIC	–	147	Waverley Wanderers (8)	2–0	Brandon Park (5)
VIC	–	148	Banyule City (4)	6–1	North Melbourne Athletic (7)
VIC	–	149	North Sunshine Eagles (4)	4–1	East Brighton United (7)
VIC	–	150	Clifton Hill (4)	0–0†	Eltham Redbacks (4)
Eltham Redbacks advance 6–5 on penalties.
VIC	–	151	Mooroolbark (5)	2–0	Nunawading City (4)
VIC	–	152	Albion Rovers (5)	0–3	Essendon United (6)
VIC	–	153	Preston Lions (4)	4–1	Altona City (4)
VIC	–	154	Thornbury Athletic (7)	0–5	Sandown Lions (7)
VIC	–	155	Fitzroy City (5)	4–0	Ashburton United (6)
VIC	–	156	Casey Comets (4)	2–1†	Williamstown (6)
VIC	–	157	Kings Domain (7)	2–4	Caufield United Cobras (4)
VIC	–	158	Berwick City (5)	0–2	St Kilda (4)
VIC	–	159	Fawkner (6)	3–5	Lalor United (6)
VIC	–	160	Corio (5)	6–2†	Melbourne University (7)
VIC	–	161	Mazenod United FC (4)	3–1	Collingwood City (6)
VIC	–	162	Skye United (6)	3–1	Bayside Argonauts (6)
VIC	–	163	Springvale City (7)	2–3	Sebastopol Vikings (6)
VIC	–	164	Strathmore (6)	2–1	West Preston (7)
VIC	–	165	Doveton FC (4)	3–0	South Yarra (6)
VIC	–	166	Mill Park (5)	3–2	Moreland United (5)
VIC	–	167	Keilor Park (4)	1–0	Peninsula Strikers (5)
VIC	–	168	Yarraville Glory (4)	2–3†	Caroline Springs George Cross (4)
VIC	–	169	Sydenham Park (4)	1–0†	Mornington (4)
VIC	–	170	Point Cook (6)	1–0	Old Scotch (5)
VIC	–	171	Upfield (6)	3–1	Brighton (6)
VIC	–	172	Essendon Royals (4)	3–3†	Brimbank Stallions (4)
Essendon Royals advance 4–3 on penalties.
VIC	–	173	South Springvale (5)	0–2	Richmond (4)
Western Australia
WA	–	174	Quinns (4)	1–3	Olympic Kingsway (3)
WA	–	175	Shamrock Rovers (4)	3–2	Maccabi SC (8)
WA	–	176	Subiaco AFC (3)	2–5	Mandurah City (3)
WA	–	177	Westnam United (7)	3–7	Wanneroo City (4)
WA	–	178	Yanchep United (8)	0–7	Curtin University (4)
WA	–	179	Polonia FC (-)	0–12	Gwelup Croatia (3)
WA	–	180	Ashfield (3)	2–0	Murdoch University Melville City (4)
WA	–	181	Bunbury Dynamos (-)	2–2	Swan United (4)
Swan United advance 5–3 on penalties.
WA	–	182	Dianella White Eagles (3)	2–3	Fremantle City (3)
WA	–	183	East Perth (7)	0–5	Balga SC (4)
WA	–	184	Gosnells City (4)	2–2	Forrestfield United (3)
Gosnells City advance 4–3 on penalties.
WA	–	185	Joondalup United (3)	2–0	North Perth United (5)
WA	–	186	Mindarie FC (12)	0–3	Warnbro Strikers SC (6)
WA	–	187	Morley-Windmills (3)	7–0	Albany Caledonian (-)
WA	–	188	North Beach (7)	0–7	Western Knights (3)
WA	–	189	Northern City (10)	1–4	Queen’s Park (6)
WA	–	190	Port Kennedy (6)	2–2	BrOzzy Sports Club (9)
Port Kennedy advance 4–3 on penalties.

Notes

- w/o = Walkover
- † = After Extra Time
- NNSW Byes – South Cardiff (3).
- QLD Byes – MA Olympic (4), Rebels Gunners (4), Townsville Warriors (4), United Park Eagles (4).
- TAS Byes – Hobart United (3).
- WA Byes – Canning City (4), Joondalup City (4), Kelmscott Roos (4), UWA-Nedlands (3).

== Fourth round ==
Fed	Zone	Tie no	Home team (Tier)	Score	Away team (Tier)
Australian Capital Territory
ACT	–	1	Canberra FC (2)	6–1	Brindabella Blues (3)
ACT	–	2	Gungahlin United (2)	4–1	UC Pumas (4)
Gungahlin United removed for fielding an ineligible player.
ACT	–	3	Belconnen United (2)	5–0	Weston-Molonglo (3)
ACT	–	4	Woden-Weston (2)	3–1	White Eagles (3)
ACT	–	5	Tuggeranong United (2)	4–1	O'Connor Knights (3)
ACT	–	6	Canberra Olympic (2)	2–1	Queanbeyan City (3)
ACT	–	7	Riverina Rhinos (2)	0–3	ANU FC (3)
ACT	–	8	Cooma Tigers (2)	1–0	Monaro Panthers (2)
New South Wales
NSW	–	9	Sydney CBD (6)	0–1	Bulli FC (6)
NSW	–	10	West Pennant Hills Cherrybrook (6)	3–2	Epping FC (6)
NSW	–	11	Blue Mountains (6)	0–7	Manly United (2)
NSW	–	12	Hills United (3)	12–1	Putney Rangers (7)
NSW	–	13	Gerringong Breakers (6)	0–9	Sutherland Sharks (2)
NSW	–	14	Tarrawanna Blueys (6)	4–2	Rydalmere Lions (3)
NSW	–	15	Coogee United (6)	7–2	Pennant Hills (6)
NSW	–	16	Dulwich Hill (4)	2–2†	Wollongong Olympic (6)
Dulwich Hill advance 5–3 on penalties.
NSW	–	17	Terrigal United (6)	2–3	Blacktown City (2)
NSW	–	18	Berkeley Vale (6)	1–3	APIA Leichhardt Tigers (2)
NSW	–	19	Hurstville City Minotaurs (5)	2–6	Mounties Wanderers (3)
NSW	–	20	Western Condors (5)	3–2	South Coast Flame (5)
NSW	–	21	Coledale Waves (8)	1–0	Manly Allambie United (7)
NSW	–	22	Abbotsford Juniors (6)	1–7	Marconi Stallions (2)
NSW	–	23	Lugarno FC (7)	1–7	Killarney District (6)
NSW	–	24	Inter Lions (4)	0–6	Hakoah Sydney City East (2)
NSW	–	25	Banksia Tigers (6)	0–2	Mt Druitt Town Rangers (2)
NSW	–	26	Dee Why (6)	4–3†	Fraser Park (5)
NSW	–	27	Northern Tigers (3)	4–0	Bankstown United (4)
NSW	–	28	Western NSW Mariners (4)	w/o	University of Wollongong (7)
NSW	–	29	Kemps Creek United (6)	1–4	Wollongong United (6)
NSW	–	30	Blacktown Spartans (3)	2–0	Bankstown City (4)
NSW	–	31	Gladesville Ryde Magic (4)	0–1	Sydney United 58 (2)
NSW	–	32	Pittwater RSL (6)	5–0	Ryde Saints United (7)
NSW	–	33	Hawkesbury City (4)	0–4	Nepean FC (5)
NSW	–	34	Dunbar Rovers (4)	1–2	Wollongong Wolves (2)
NSW	–	35	Woonona Sharks (6)	3–1	GFHA Spirit (3)
NSW	–	36	Rockdale City Suns (2)	3–0	St George City (3)
NSW	–	37	Coniston FC (6)	6–0	West Ryde Rovers (6)
NSW	–	38	The Ponds (6)	3–2†	Camden Tigers (4)
NSW	–	39	Macarthur Rams (3)	1–2	Stanmore Hawks (4)
NSW	–	40	Kirrawee Kangaroos (6)	7–0	Thornleigh Thunder (7)
NSW	–	41	Hurstville City (5)	0–2	UNSW (5)
NSW	–	42	Sydney University (4)	2–0	Canterbury Bankstown Berries (3)
NSW	–	43	Cronulla Seagulls (6)	0–7	Bonnyrigg White Eagles (3)
NSW	–	44	North Shore Mariners (3)	7–0	Gwandalan Summerland Point (7)
NSW	–	45	Hazelbrook FC (6)	3–2	Bankstown Sports Strikers (6)
NSW	–	46	St George FC (3)	2–1	SD Raiders (4)
NSW	–	47	Lindfield FC (6)	1–3	Sydney Olympic (2)
NSW	–	48	Umina United (7)	2–1	Forest Killarney (7)
Northern New South Wales
NNSW	NTH	49	Boambee Bombers (4)	7–1	South Armidale United (4)
NNSW	NTH	50	Coffs City United (4)	3–2	Woolgoolga Wolves (4)
NNSW	NTH	51	Goonellabah Hornets (4)	1–1†	Kempsey Saints (4)
Kempsey Saints advance 5–4 on penalties.
NNSW	NTH	52	Bangalow Bluedogs (4)	2–1	Coffs Coast Tigers (4)
NNSW	STH	53	Edgeworth FC (2)	2–0	West Wallsend (3)
NNSW	STH	54	South Cardiff (3)	1–2	Broadmeadow Magic (2)
NNSW	STH	55	Lambton Jaffas (2)	10–0	Beresfield United Senior (4)
NNSW	STH	56	Swansea FC (4)	0–4	Maitland FC (2)
NNSW	STH	57	Valentine FC (2)	4–0	Toronto Awaba Stags (3)
NNSW	STH	58	Cessnock City Hornets (3)	2–1	Lake Macquarie City (2)
NNSW	STH	59	New Lambton (3)	3–0	Dudley Redhead United Senior (4)
NNSW	STH	60	Weston Workers Bears (2)	4–1	Cooks Hill United (3)
NNSW	STH	61	Kahibah FC (3)	3–0	Adamstown Rosebud (2)
NNSW	STH	62	Hamilton Olympic (2)	6–1	Hamilton Azzurri (5)
NNSW	STH	63	Warners Bay (4)	5–1	Nelson Bay (6)
NNSW	STH	64	Charlestown City Blues (2)	7–0	Belmont Swansea United (3)
Northern Territory
NT	ASP	65	Verdi FC (2)	3–1	Alice Springs Celtic (2)
NT	ASP	66	MPH Vikings (2)	1–3	Alice Springs Stormbirds (2)
NT	DAR	67	Port Darwin (2)	7–0	Palmerston Rovers (2)
NT	DAR	68	Casuarina FC (2)	3–2†	Mindil Aces (2)
NT	DAR	69	University Azzurri (2)	5–0	Litchfield FC (3)
NT	DAR	70	Darwin Olympic (2)	2–0	Darwin Hearts FC (3)
Queensland
QLD	CQ	71	Capricorn Coast (4)	1–2	Bluebirds United (4)
QLD	FNQ	72	Edge Hill United (4)	5–1	Innisfail United (4)
QLD	FNQ	73	Stratford Dolphins (4)	0–4	Leichhardt Lions (4)
QLD	MR	74	Mackay Rangers (4)	2–7	Magpies Crusaders United (2)
QLD	MR	75	Mackay Wanderers (4)	2–4	Mackay Magpies (4)
QLD	NQ	76	MA Olympic (4)	1–3	Brothers Townsville (4)
QLD	NQ	77	Rebels Gunners (4)	1–3	Townsville Warriors (4)
QLD	WB	78	Sunbury Blues (4)	3–2	KSS Jets (4)
QLD	SEQ	79	UQFC (4)	4–5	Rochedale Rovers (3)
QLD	SEQ	80	Holland Park (3)	2–2†	Robina City FC (5)
Holland Park Hawks advance 1–0 on penalties.
QLD	SEQ	81	Samford Rangers (5)	1–4	Brisbane Athletic (6)
QLD	SEQ	82	Coomera Colts (4)	4–2	Ipswich Knights (3)
QLD	SEQ	83	Lions FC (2)	3–0	Capalaba (3)
QLD	SEQ	84	Burleigh Heads Bulldogs (4)	3–0	Albany Creek (4)

Fed	Zone	Tie no	Home team (Tier)	Score	Away team (Tier)
QLD	SEQ	85	Bethania Rams (7)	1–2	Palm Beach Sharks (4)
QLD	SEQ	86	Taringa Rovers (4)	2–3	Logan Metro (7)
QLD	SEQ	87	Brisbane Strikers (2)	10–1	Souths United (3)
QLD	SEQ	88	Surfers Paradise Apollo (4)	6–1	Maroochydore Swans (4)
QLD	SEQ	89	Olympic FC (2)	16–0	Gympie United (4)
QLD	SEQ	90	Mitchelton (3)	4–1	North Star (5)
QLD	SEQ	91	Nambour Yandina United (4)	5–0	Clairvaux (6)
QLD	SEQ	92	Western Pride (2)	3–2†	Noosa Lions (4)
QLD	SEQ	93	New Farm United (5)	1–6	Grange Thistle (4)
QLD	SEQ	94	Redlands United (2)	8–0	AC Carina (5)
QLD	SEQ	95	Peninsula Power (2)	3–0	Caboolture Sports (4)
QLD	SEQ	96	Kawana (4)	2–3	Sunshine Coast Wanderers (3)
QLD	SEQ	97	Gold Coast Knights (2)	3–0	Sunshine Coast (2)
QLD	SEQ	98	South West Queensland Thunder (2)	3–0	Wolves FC (3)
QLD	SEQ	99	Brisbane City (2)	5–2	Gold Coast United (2)
QLD	SEQ	100	Moreton Bay United (2)	4–1	Springfield United (7)
QLD	SEQ	101	Eastern Suburbs (2)	3–0	Southside Eagles (3)
QLD	SEQ	102	Southport (5)	3–7	Logan Lightning (3)
South Australia
SA	–	103	White City (3)	0–1	Adelaide Victory (4)
SA	–	104	Adelaide Comets (2)	2–1	South Adelaide (2)
SA	–	105	Adelaide Raiders (2)	2–1	Adelaide Blue Eagles (2)
SA	–	106	Adelaide City (2)	10–0	Elizabeth Vale (5)
SA	–	107	Croydon Kings (2)	2–1	Playford City (4)
SA	–	108	Cumberland United (3)	2–3	Adelaide Olympic (2)
SA	–	109	Elizabeth Downs (5)	4–1	Adelaide Vipers (4)
SA	–	110	Para Hills Knights (2)	1–2	North Eastern MetroStars (2)
Tasmania
TAS	–	111	Olympia (2)	1–0	Glenorchy Knights (2)
TAS	–	112	Kingborough Lions United (2)	1–2	Devonport City (2)
TAS	–	113	Launceston City (2)	1–2	University of Tasmania (3)
TAS	–	114	Clarence United (2)	0–6	Hobart Zebras (2)
TAS	–	115	Riverside Olympic (2)	3–0	Nelson Eastern Suburbs (3)
TAS	–	116	Somerset (3)	4–2	Beachside (3)
TAS	–	117	Taroona (3)	2–0	Metro FC (3)
TAS	–	118	Hobart United (3)	1–3	South Hobart (2)
Victoria
VIC	–	119	Casey Comets (4)	3–3†	Goulburn Valley Suns (3)
Casey Comets advance 4–3 on penalties.
VIC	–	120	Upfield SC (6)	0–1	Skye United (6)
VIC	–	121	Port Melbourne (2)	0–1	St Albans Saints (3)
VIC	–	122	Waverley Wanderers (8)	1–0	Lalor United (6)
VIC	–	123	Werribee City (3)	3–1	Green Gully (2)
VIC	–	124	Heidelberg United (2)	3–0	Keilor Park (4)
VIC	–	125	Caufield United Cobras (4)	2–3	Boroondara-Carey Eagles (5)
VIC	–	126	Preston Lions (4)	3–1	Dandenong City (2)
VIC	–	127	Bulleen Lions (3)	6–0	Sandown Lions (7)
VIC	–	128	Sydenham Park (4)	5–4	Banyule City (4)
VIC	–	129	Geelong SC (3)	3–1†	Essendon United (6)
VIC	–	130	Epping City (5)	1–2	Brunswick City (3)
VIC	–	131	Hume City (2)	1–0	Mill Park (5)
VIC	–	132	Fitzroy City (5)	2–1	Manningham United (3)
VIC	–	133	Dandenong Thunder (2)	2–3	Northcote City (3)
VIC	–	134	Moreland Zebras (3)	4–2†	North Sunshine Eagles (4)
VIC	–	135	South Melbourne (2)	1–0	Essendon Royals (4)
VIC	–	136	Eastern Lions (3)	3–1	Caroline Springs George Cross (4)
VIC	–	137	Avondale FC (2)	6–0	Mazenod United FC (4)
VIC	–	138	Melbourne Knights (2)	7–0	Mooroolbark (5)
VIC	–	139	Doveton FC (4)	4–1	Point Cook (6)
VIC	–	140	Pascoe Vale (2)	2–2†	Moreland City (3)
Pascoe Vale advance 10–9 on penalties.
VIC	–	141	Sebastopol Vikings (6)	1–2	Murray United (3)
VIC	–	142	Corio SC (5)	1–4	Langwarrin SC (3)
VIC	–	143	Altona Magic (2)	4–2	Box Hill United (3)
VIC	–	144	Kingston City (2)	2–1	St Kilda (4)
VIC	–	145	North Geelong Warriors (3)	1–0	Richmond SC (4)
VIC	–	146	Whittlesea Ranges (3)	2–1†	FC Strathmore (6)
VIC	–	147	Oakleigh Cannons (2)	2–0	Beaumaris SC (4)
VIC	–	148	Springvale White Eagles (3)	0–1	Eltham Redbacks (4)
VIC	–	149	Ballarat City (3)	0–2	Westgate FC (5)
VIC	–	150	Warragul United (4)	0–3	Bentleigh Greens (2)
Western Australia
WA	–	151	Kelmscott Roos (4)	0–4	Floreat Athena (2)
WA	–	152	Fremantle City (3)	5–1	Queen’s Park (6)
WA	–	153	Stirling Lions (2)	5–3	Western Knights (3)
WA	–	154	Canning City (4)	3–2	Port Kennedy (6)
WA	–	155	Olympic Kingsway (3)	8–2	Joondalup City (4)
WA	–	156	UWA-Nedlands (3)	3–1	Swan United (4)
WA	–	157	Curtin University (4)	3–3†	Mandurah City (3)
Curtin University advance 4–1 on penalties.
WA	–	158	Gwelup Croatia (3)	2–2†	Armadale (2)
Gwelup Croatia advance 3–0 on penalties.
WA	–	159	Inglewood United (2)	1–3	Balga SC (4)
WA	–	160	Wanneroo City (4)	1–3	Warnbro Strikers SC (6)
WA	–	161	Ashfield (3)	1–2	Rockingham City (2)
WA	–	162	Perth SC (2)	3–1	Morley-Windmills (3)
WA	–	163	Sorrento (2)	1–1†	ECU Joondalup (2)
Sorrento advance 5–4 on penalties.
WA	–	164	Gosnells City (4)	1–2	Bayswater City (2)
WA	–	165	Cockburn City (2)	4–0	Joondalup United (3)
WA	–	166	Balcatta (2)	3–1	Shamrock Rovers (4)

Notes:

- w/o = Walkover
- † = After Extra Time
- NT Byes – Hellenic AC (2)

== Fifth round ==
Fed	Zone	Tie no	Home team (Tier)	Score	Away team (Tier)
Australian Capital Territory
ACT	–	1	Woden-Weston (2)	0–2	Tuggeranong United (2)
ACT	–	2	Canberra Olympic (2)	0–1	Canberra FC (2)
ACT	–	3	Cooma Tigers (2)	6–1	UC Pumas (4)
ACT	–	4	ANU FC (3)	2–0	Belconnen United (2)
New South Wales
NSW	–	5	Bulli FC (6)	2–4	Bonnyrigg White Eagles (3)
NSW	–	6	Blacktown City (2)	3–1	Blacktown Spartans (3)
NSW	–	7	The Ponds (6)	1–5	Marconi Stallions (2)
NSW	–	8	Sydney Olympic (2)	2–0	Stanmore Hawks (4)
NSW	–	9	West Pennant Hills Cherrybrook (6)	0–4	St George FC (3)
NSW	–	10	Sydney United 58 (2)	3–0	Woonona Sharks (6)
NSW	–	11	Hazelbrook FC (6)	2–2†	Killarney District (6)
Hazelbrook advance 4–3 on penalties.
NSW	–	12	Umina United (7)	0–3	Pittwater RSL (6)
NSW	–	13	Rockdale City Suns (2)	3–2	Wollongong United (6)
NSW	–	14	Hills United (3)	1–3	Mounties Wanderers (3)
NSW	–	15	Mt Druitt Town Rangers (2)	8–1	Kirrawee Kangaroos (6)
NSW	–	16	Dulwich Hill (4)	3–1	Tarrawanna Blueys (6)
NSW	–	17	Western Condors (5)	2–2†	Sutherland Sharks (2)
Sutherland Sharks advance 4–1 on penalties.
NSW	–	18	Hakoah Sydney City East (2)	6–0	Western NSW Mariners (4)
NSW	–	19	APIA Leichhardt Tigers (2)	3–1†	Coogee United (6)
NSW	–	20	Coledale Waves (8)	0–11	Wollongong Wolves (2)
NSW	–	21	North Shore Mariners (3)	0–2	Northern Tigers (3)
NSW	–	22	Nepean FC (5)	3–1†	UNSW (5)
NSW	–	23	Sydney University (4)	5–1	Dee Why (6)
NSW	–	24	Manly United (2)	3–0	Coniston FC (6)
Northern New South Wales
NNSW	NTH	25	Boambee Bombers (4)	5–3	Coffs City United (4)
NNSW	NTH	26	Bangalow Bluedogs (4)	1–0	Kempsey Saints (4)
NNSW	STH	27	Kahibah FC (3)	5–4†	Cessnock City Hornets (3)
NNSW	STH	28	Lambton Jaffas (2)	1–2†	Broadmeadow Magic (2)
NNSW	STH	29	Maitland FC (2)	4–2	Charlestown City Blues (2)
NNSW	STH	30	Weston Workers Bears (2)	1–1†	Valentine FC (2)
Valentine Phoenix advance 4–1 on penalties.
NNSW	STH	31	Warners Bay (4)	0–11	Hamilton Olympic (2)
NNSW	STH	32	New Lambton (3)	0–2	Edgeworth FC (2)
Northern Territory
NT	ASP	33	Verdi FC (2)	4–3†	Alice Springs Stormbirds (2)
NT	DAR	34	Hellenic AC (2)	2–3†	Darwin Olympic (2)
NT	DAR	35	University Azzurri (2)	4–1	Port Darwin (2)
Queensland
QLD	CQ v WB	36	Bluebirds United (4)	2–1	Sunbury Blues (4)
QLD	FNQ	37	Edge Hill United (4)	2–5	Leichhardt Lions (4)
QLD	MR	38	Mackay Magpies (4)	1–5	Magpies Crusaders United (2)
QLD	NQ	39	Brothers Townsville (4)	3–3†	Townsville Warriors (4)
Brothers Townsville advance 4–2 on penalties.
QLD	SEQ	40	Burleigh Heads Bulldogs (4)	3–1	Western Pride (2)
QLD	SEQ	41	Eastern Suburbs (2)	3–0	Mitchelton (3)

Fed	Zone	Tie no	Home team (Tier)	Score	Away team (Tier)
QLD	SEQ	42	Palm Beach Sharks (4)	6–4†	Nambour Yandina United (4)
QLD	SEQ	43	South West Queensland Thunder (2)	1–3	Logan Lightning (3)
QLD	SEQ	44	Lions FC (2)	1–3†	Brisbane Strikers (2)
QLD	SEQ	45	Sunshine Coast Wanderers (3)	1–3	Gold Coast Knights (2)
QLD	SEQ	46	Holland Park (3)	6–1	Brisbane Athletic (6)
QLD	SEQ	47	Rochedale Rovers (3)	0–4	Olympic FC (2)
QLD	SEQ	48	Coomera Colts (4)	6–5†	Redlands United (2)
QLD	SEQ	49	Logan Metro (7)	0–1	Moreton Bay United (2)
QLD	SEQ	50	Peninsula Power (2)	2–2†	Brisbane City (2)
Peninsula Power advance 4–3 on penalties.
QLD	SEQ	51	Surfers Paradise Apollo (4)	5–1	Grange Thistle (4)
South Australia
SA	–	52	Croydon Kings (2)	1–2	Adelaide City (2)
SA	–	53	Adelaide Comets (2)	3–3†	Adelaide Raiders (2)
Adelaide Comets advance 5–3 on penalties.
SA	–	54	Elizabeth Downs (5)	3–3†	North Eastern MetroStars (2)
Elizabeth Downs advance 4–2 on penalties.
SA	–	55	Adelaide Victory (4)	0–2	Adelaide Olympic (2)
Tasmania
TAS	–	56	Olympia (2)	3–1	Riverside Olympic (2)
TAS	–	57	Hobart Zebras (2)	1–1†	Devonport City (2)
Devonport City advance 4–3 on penalties.
TAS	–	58	Taroona (3)	0–5	South Hobart (2)
TAS	–	59	Somerset (3)	0–5	University of Tasmania (3)
Victoria
VIC	–	60	Moreland Zebras (3)	2–0	Whittlesea Ranges (3)
VIC	–	61	Eastern Lions (3)	3–4†	St Albans Saints (3)
VIC	–	62	Fitzroy City (5)	0–3	Melbourne Knights (2)
VIC	–	63	Preston Lions (4)	0–2	Avondale FC (2)
VIC	–	64	Northcote City (3)	1–0	Boroondara-Carey Eagles (5)
VIC	–	65	Eltham Redbacks (4)	1–1†	Pascoe Vale (2)
Eltham Redbacks advance 4–3 on penalties.
VIC	–	66	Murray United (3)	0–2	Bulleen Lions (3)
VIC	–	67	Geelong SC (3)	4–0	Skye United (6)
VIC	–	68	Kingston City (2)	0–1	Bentleigh Greens (2)
VIC	–	69	Brunswick City (3)	0–2	Werribee City (3)
VIC	–	70	Doveton FC (4)	0–1	South Melbourne (2)
VIC	–	71	Heidelberg United (2)	4–5†	Hume City (2)
VIC	–	72	Westgate FC (5)	4–1	Sydenham Park (4)
VIC	–	73	Altona Magic (2)	2–1	Casey Comets (4)
VIC	–	74	Waverley Wanderers (8)	2–6	Langwarrin SC (3)
VIC	–	75	Oakleigh Cannons (2)	4–1	North Geelong Warriors (3)
Western Australia
WA	–	76	Sorrento (2)	2–1	Gwelup Croatia (3)
WA	–	77	UWA-Nedlands (3)	2–1†	Stirling Lions (2)
WA	–	78	Balga SC (4)	0–7	Perth SC (2)
WA	–	79	Balcatta (2)	2–1	Canning City (4)
WA	–	80	Rockingham City (2)	5–1	Curtin University (4)
WA	–	81	Fremantle City (3)	6–0	Warnbro Strikers SC (6)
WA	–	82	Bayswater City (2)	3–2	Cockburn City (2)
WA	–	83	Olympic Kingsway (3)	0–3	Floreat Athena (2)

Notes:

- † = After Extra Time
- NT Byes – Casuarina FC (2)

== Sixth round ==
State	Zone	Tie no	Home team (Tier)	Score	Away team (Tier)
Australian Capital Territory
ACT	–	1	Tuggeranong United (2)	0–2	Cooma Tigers (2)
ACT	–	2	ANU FC (3)	1–2†	Canberra FC (2)
New South Wales
NSW	–	3	Hakoah Sydney City East (2)	0–3	Marconi Stallions (2)
NSW	–	4	Pittwater RSL (6)	1–2	Wollongong Wolves (2)
NSW	–	5	Hazelbrook FC (6)	1–4	Mt Druitt Town Rangers (2)
NSW	–	6	Sydney United 58 (2)	2–1	Blacktown City (2)
NSW	–	7	Northern Tigers (3)	4–3	Bonnyrigg White Eagles (3)
NSW	–	8	Sutherland Sharks (2)	0–1	Manly United (2)
NSW	–	9	Rockdale City Suns (2)	6–1	Sydney University (4)
NSW	–	10	Mounties Wanderers (3)	1–3	Dulwich Hill (4)
NSW	–	11	St George FC (3)	1–0	APIA Leichhardt Tigers (2)
NSW	–	12	Nepean FC (5)	1–2†	Sydney Olympic (2)
Northern New South Wales
NNSW	NTH v STH	13	Boambee Bombers (4)	2–7	Maitland FC (2)
NNSW	NTH v STH	14	Bangalow Bluedogs (4)	1–10	Hamilton Olympic (2)
NNSW	STH	15	Broadmeadow Magic (2)	0–4	Edgeworth FC (2)
NNSW	STH	16	Kahibah FC (3)	1–8	Valentine FC (2)
Northern Territory
NT	DAR	17	University Azzurri (2)	3–1	Casuarina FC (2)
NT	DAR v ASP	18	Darwin Olympic (2)	6–1	Verdi FC (2)
Queensland
QLD	FNQ v NQ	19	Leichhardt Lions (4)	0–7	Brothers Townsville (4)
QLD	NQ	20	Magpies Crusaders United (2)	4–0	Bluebirds United (4)
QLD	SEQ	21	Surfers Paradise Apollo (4)	3–1	Moreton Bay United (2)

State	Zone	Tie no	Home team (Tier)	Score	Away team (Tier)
QLD	SEQ	22	Holland Park (3)	2–3	Coomera Colts (4)
QLD	SEQ	23	Olympic FC (2)	4–1	Palm Beach Sharks (4)
QLD	SEQ	24	Gold Coast Knights (2)	4–2†	Peninsula Power (2)
QLD	SEQ	25	Eastern Suburbs (2)	1–4	Brisbane Strikers (2)
QLD	SEQ	26	Burleigh Heads Bulldogs (4)	2–3	Logan Lightning (3)
South Australia
SA	–	27	Adelaide City (2)	2–1	Elizabeth Downs (5)
SA	–	28	Adelaide Olympic (2)	2–1	Adelaide Comets (2)
Tasmania
TAS	–	29	South Hobart (2)	5–2	Olympia (2)
TAS	–	30	University of Tasmania (3)	1–2	Devonport City (2)
Victoria
VIC	–	31	Hume City (2)	2–0	Bentleigh Greens (2)
VIC	–	32	Bulleen Lions (3)	2–1	Northcote City (3)
VIC	–	33	Eltham Redbacks (4)	0–3	Altona Magic (2)
VIC	–	34	Geelong SC (3)	2–3†	St Albans Saints (3)
VIC	–	35	South Melbourne (2)	2–1	Langwarrin SC (3)
VIC	–	36	Moreland Zebras (3)	2–0	Westgate FC (5)
VIC	–	37	Melbourne Knights (2)	2–1†	Avondale FC (2)
VIC	–	38	Werribee City (3)	0–1	Oakleigh Cannons (2)
Western Australia
WA	–	39	Fremantle City (3)	0–2	Sorrento (2)
WA	–	40	UWA-Nedlands (3)	0–3	Rockingham City (2)
WA	–	41	Perth SC (2)	2–3	Bayswater City (2)
WA	–	42	Balcatta (2)	0–1	Floreat Athena (2)

== Seventh round ==
Fed	Zone	Tie no	Home team (Tier)	Score	Away team (Tier)
Australian Capital Territory
ACT	–	1	Canberra FC (2)	0–0†	Cooma Tigers (2)
Cooma Tigers advance 4–2 on penalties.
New South Wales
NSW	–	2	Manly United (2)	1–0†	Rockdale City Suns (2)
NSW	–	3	Wollongong Wolves (2)	0–1	Mt Druitt Town Rangers (2)
NSW	–	4	Dulwich Hill (4)	0–4	St George FC (3)
NSW	–	5	Sydney Olympic (2)	1–3	Marconi Stallions (2)
NSW	–	6	Sydney United 58 (2)	3–2†	Northern Tigers (3)
Northern New South Wales
NNSW	–	7	Valentine FC (2)	0–5	Edgeworth FC (2)
NNSW	–	8	Maitland FC (2)	2–1	Hamilton Olympic (2)
Northern Territory
NT	–	9	University Azzurri (2)	2–2†	Darwin Olympic (2)
Darwin Olympic advance 5–4 on penalties.
Queensland
QLD	NQ	10	Brothers Townsville (4)	1–1†	Magpies Crusaders United (2)
Mackay & Whitsundays Magpies Crusaders United advance 3–2 on penalties.

Fed	Zone	Tie no	Home team (Tier)	Score	Away team (Tier)
QLD	SEQ	11	Surfers Paradise Apollo (4)	1–2	Olympic FC (2)
QLD	SEQ	12	Gold Coast Knights (2)	1–5	Brisbane Strikers (2)
QLD	SEQ	13	Coomera Colts (4)	2–1	Logan Lightning (3)
South Australia
SA	–	14	Adelaide Olympic (2)	3–2	Adelaide City (2)
Tasmania
TAS	–	15	Devonport City (2)	0–2	South Hobart (2)
Victoria
VIC	–	16	Hume City (2)	0–0†	Oakleigh Cannons (2)
Hume City advance 3–2 on penalties.
VIC	–	17	Altona Magic (2)	0–1	Moreland Zebras (3)
VIC	–	18	Bulleen Lions (3)	3–1	St Albans Saints (3)
VIC	–	19	Melbourne Knights (2)	4–2	South Melbourne (2)
Western Australia
WA	–	20	Bayswater City (2)	1–0	Rockingham City (2)
WA	–	21	Floreat Athena (2)	1–1†	Sorrento FC (2)
Floreat Athena advance 4–3 on penalties.

Notes

- † = After Extra Time
