= 2021 FSA Federation Cup =

2021 FFA Cup South Australian preliminary rounds

Tournament details
- Country: Australia
- Dates: 24 March–14 July
- Teams: 52

Final positions
- Champions: Adelaide Olympic (2nd title)
- Runners-up: Adelaide City
- FFA Cup: Adelaide City; Adelaide Olympic

Tournament statistics
- Matches played: 50

The 2021 Football South Australia Federation Cup, also known as the FFA Cup South Australian preliminary rounds until the semi-finals, was the 108th running of the Federation Cup, the main soccer knockout cup competition in South Australia. The competition also functioned as part of the 2021 FFA Cup preliminary rounds, with the two finalists qualifying for the main knockout competition.

Adelaide Olympic were champions for the second time, defeating Adelaide City 2–1 in the final, defending their 2019 title.

== Schedule ==
Round	Draw date	Match dates	No. of fixtures	Teams	New entries this round
First round	10 March	24 March–14 April	20	52 → 32	40
Second round	31 March	23–24 April	15	32 → 16	12
Third round	30 April	14–16 May	8	16 → 8	None
Quarter-finals	19 May	8–9 June	4	8 → 4	None
Semi-finals	11 June	22–23 June	2	4 → 2	None
Final	—	14 July	1	2 → 1	None

== Teams ==
Location of teams participating in the Federation Cup

A total of 52 teams participated in the competition, 49 from the Greater Adelaide area, two from the Adelaide Hills region and one from Gawler and Port Pirie. National Premier Leagues South Australia, State League One and State League Two represent levels 2–4 on the unofficial Australian league system and are required to participate in the Federation Cup. The South Australian Regional Leagues represent level 5. The South Australian Amateur Soccer League is not represented on the national league system. Adelaide United Youth are not eligible for the tournament, as the senior team entered the FFA Cup competition at the Round of 32.

National Premier League (2) Adelaide Blue Eagles Adelaide City Adelaide Comets Adelaide Croatia Raiders Adelaide Olympic Campbelltown City Croydon Kings Cumberland United North Eastern MetroStars South Adelaide Panthers Sturt Lions	State League One (3) Adelaide Cobras Adelaide Hills Hawks Adelaide Victory Eastern United Fulham United Modbury Jets Para Hills Knights Playford City Patriots West Adelaide Western Strikers West Torrens Birkalla White City Woodville	State League Two (4) Adelaide University Gawler Eagles Modbury Vista Mount Barker United Noarlunga United Northern Demons Pontian Eagles Port Adelaide Pirates Salisbury United Seaford Rangers The Cove Vipers FC	Regional Leagues (5) Collegiate Adelaide University Grads Blue Cardijn Old Collegians Pembroke Old Scholars Rostrevor Old Collegians Sacred Heart Old Collegians Unley Old Scholars	Amateur League (-) Adelaide Red Blue Eagles Adelaide Thunder Adelaide Titans BOSA FC Brahma Lodge Elizabeth Downs Ghan Kilburn City Ingle Farm Messinian Association Hawks Old Ignatians USC Lion

== Bracket ==
First round Third preliminary round
The Cove	3
Noarlunga United	2
Modbury Vista	0
Adelaide University	3
Ghan Kilburn City	6
Adelaide Titans	1
Adelaide Redblue Eagles	2
Salisbury United	4
Northern Demons	1
Adelaide Thunder	0
Port Adelaide Pirates	4
Vipers FC	1
West Adelaide	4
Seaford Rangers	3
Cardijn Old Collegians	3
Mount Barker United	4
Adelaide Victory	3
Rostrevor Old Collegians	0
BOSA FC	4
Adelaide Uni Grads Blue	3
Modury Jets	2
Eastern United	1
White City	7
Unley Old Scholars	0
Pembroke Old Scholars	5
Old Ignatians	3
Adelaide Hills Hawks (a.e.t.)	3
Adelaide Cobras	2
USC Lion	0
Pontian Eagles	2
Brahma Lodge	11
Sacred Heart Old Collegians	0
Gawler Eagles	1
West Torrens Birkalla	2
Western Strikers	1
Elizabeth Downs	3
Messinian Association Hawks	0
Para Hills Knights	5
Playford City Patriots	6
Ingle Farm	0

Second round Fourth preliminary round
The Cove	1
Fulham United (a.e.t.)	2
Adelaide Olympic	1
Adelaide University	0
Ghan Kilburn City
Salisbury United	w/o
Northern Demons	0
Croydon FC	4
South Adelaide Panthers	0
Campbelltown City	2
Port Adelaide Pirates	4
West Adelaide	2
Adelaide Comets	9
Mount Barker United	1
Adelaide Victory	3
Adelaide Croatia Raiders	2
BOSA FC	1
Modbury Jets	5
Sturt Lions	2
Cumberland United	0
White City	5
Pembroke Old Scholars	0
Adelaide City	3
Adelaide Hills Hawks	2
Pontian Eagles	3
Brahma Lodge (a.e.t.)	4
West Torrens Birkalla	0
North Eastern MetroStars	2
Elizabeth Downs (a.e.t.)	3
Para Hills Knights	2
Playford City Patriots	2
Adelaide Blue Eagles	1

Third round Fifth preliminary round
Fulham United	1
Adelaide Olympic	3
Salisbury United	1 (4)
Croydon FC (p)	1 (5)
Campbelltown City	3
Port Adelaide Pirates	0
Adelaide Comets	4
Adelaide Victory	0
Modbury Jets	0
Sturt Lions	1
White City	2
Adelaide City	3
Brahma Lodge	3
North Eastern MetroStars (a.e.t.)	5
Elizabeth Downs	0
Playford City Patriots	3

Quarter-finals; Sixth preliminary round
Adelaide Olympic	2
Croydon FC	0
Campbelltown City	4
Adelaide Comets	1
Sturt Lions	2
Adelaide City	4
North Eastern MetroStars	5
Playford City Patriots	2

Semi-finals; Seventh preliminary round
Adelaide Olympic	1
Campbelltown City	0
Adelaide City	2
North Eastern MetroStars	0

Final
Adelaide Olympic	2
Adelaide City	1

== First round ==
The first round of the Federation Cup was also the third round of the 2021 FFA Cup preliminary rounds. Fulham United (3) received a bye to the second round.

Times before 4 April are in ACDT, times on or after 4 April are in ACST

24 March	USC Lion (-)	0–2	Pontian Eagles (4)	Grange
19:30		Report	Koutoulogenis 3', 20'	Stadium: Grange Reserve

26 March	BOSA FC (-)	4–3	Adelaide University Grads Blue (5)	Prospect
19:15	Abela 58'; D'Arrigo 63', 73'; Vatsilas 88'	Report	Elder 50', 69'; Taylor 87'	Stadium: Charles Cane Reserve

26 March	Adelaide Victory (3)	3–0	Rostrevor Old Collegians (5)	Blair Athol
19:15	Cash 39'; Ueda 73'; Scardigno 85'	Report		Stadium: Rushworth Reserve

26 March	Western Strikers (3)	1–3	Elizabeth Downs (-)	Royal Park
19:30	Katsigiannis 51'	Report	Brennan 17'; Gundlach 51', 54'	Stadium: Carnegie Reserve

26 March	Gawler Eagles (4)	1–2	West Torrens Birkalla (3)	Evanston Gardens
19:30	Cook 71'	Report	Makridis 13'; Mbarga 31'	Stadium: Karbeethan Reserve

26 March	Playford City Patriots (3)	6–0	Ingle Farm (-)	Edinburgh North
19:30	Farrell 8', 77', 87'; Ajak 28'; Ryan 43'; Capone 61'	Report		Stadium: Ramsay Park

26 March	Adelaide Red Blue Eagles (-)	2–4	Salisbury United (4)	Burton
19:30	Hennan 31', 68'	Report	Martyn 39' (pen.), 57' (pen.); Greaves 71'; Bigirimana 90+2'	Stadium: Steve Jarvis Park

27 March	Adelaide Hills Hawks (3)	3–2 (a.e.t.)	Adelaide Cobras (3)	Woodside
12:00	Daly 6'; Grant 105'; Elliott 114'	Report	Mitris 80' (pen.); Theodorou 102'	Stadium: Hawks Nest

27 March	The Cove (4)	3–2	Noarlunga United (4)	Hallett Cove
14:00	Atkinson 44'; Moon 75'; McLoughlin 90+4'	Report	Bradley 5'; Ebert 20'	Stadium: Cove Sports and Community Centre

27 March	Cardijn Old Collegians (5)	3–4	Mount Barker United (4)	Noarlunga Downs
14:30	Tamakuni-Keast 18'; Roach 78'; Robertson 90+2'	Report	Maddison-Harris 2', 81'; Peck 54'; Siebert 82'	Stadium: Cardijn College

27 March	Messinian Association Hawks (-)	0–5	Para Hills Knights (3)	Torrensville
14:30		Report	Hasegawa 16', 53'; Davis 45'; Rositano 64'; Nestoras 85'	Stadium: Kings Reserve

27 March	Modbury Vista (4)	0–3	Adelaide University (4)	Wynn Vale
14:45		Report	Menechella 57'; Gretchko 77'; Bowman 90'	Stadium: Newspot Stadium

27 March	White City Woodville (3)	7–0	Unley Old Scholars (5)	Woodville West
15:00	Pudler 1' (pen.); Dimas 3'; Simic 56'; Love 58'; O'Neill 58' (o.g.); Butler-Bowden 81'; Bezbradica 82'	Report		Stadium: Frank Mitchell Park

27 March	Modbury Jets (3)	2–1	Eastern United (3)	Ridgehaven
15:00	Radice 2'; Doyle 81'	Report	Dello 65'	Stadium: Smith Partners Stadium

27 March	Pembroke Old Scholars (5)	5–3	Old Ignatians (-)	Angle Park
15:00	Hunt 16', 54', 62', 83'; Kabasela 68'	Report	Penta 70'; Khoury 79', 85'	Stadium: VALO Football Centre

27 March	Northern Demons (4)	1–0	Adelaide Thunder (-)	Port Pirie
15:30	Capurso 4' (pen.)	Report		Stadium: Byrne Park

27 March	West Adelaide (3)	4–3	Seaford Rangers (4)	Klemzig
17:30	Kostopoulos 8'; Da Silva 26'; Acton 84'; Yull 89'	Report	37', 44', 87'; Balley; Hunt; Rayner	Stadium: T.K. Shutter Reserve

27 March	Port Adelaide Pirates (4)	4–1	Vipers FC (4)	Taperoo
19:00	Skeffington 44'; Williams 47'; Marchioro 61'; Anderson 84'	Report	Ibrahim 45'	Stadium: Ngarrpadla Josie Agius Reserve

28 March	Brahma Lodge (-)	11–0	Sacred Heart Old Collegians (5)	Brahma Lodge
14:00	Butler 16'; Petkovic 29', 46', 62', 65'; Hamsory 36'; Centrone 40'; Bugeja 43', 57', 71'; Thornton 60'	Report		Stadium: Cockburn Green

14 April	Ghan Kilburn City (-)	6–1	Adelaide Titans (-)	Angle Park
19:30	Pearce 14' (o.g.); Kamara 21', 47'; Abbasi 38'; Dadzie 59'; Hussaini 82' (pen.)	Report	Mangafakis 22'	Stadium: VALO Football Centre

== Second round ==
The second round of the Federation Cup was also the fourth round of the 2021 FFA Cup preliminary rounds, featuring 21 teams from the previous round and the 11 teams from the National Premier Leagues South Australia.

All times are in ACST

23 April	Elizabeth Downs (-)	3–2 (a.e.t.)	Para Hills Knights (3)	Elizabeth Downs
19:30	Watson 68', 84'; Gundlach 101'	Report	Nestoras 29' (pen.); Ahmed 77'	Stadium: Argana Park

23 April	BOSA FC (-)	1–5	Modbury Jets (3)	Prospect
19:30	Muhoma 50' (o.g.)	Report	Pollock 12' (pen.); Mitchell 22' (o.g.); Wegener 59'; Barr 66', 77'	Stadium: Charles Cane Reserve

23 April	Pontian Eagles (4)	3–4	Brahma Lodge (-)	Paralowie
19:30	Toscano 4'; Koutoulogenis 56'; Abachu 86' (pen.)	Report	Bugeja 8', 51'; Fyfe 43'; Centrone 114' (pen.)	Stadium: Yalumba Drive Reserve

24 April	Adelaide City (2)	3–2	Adelaide Hills Hawks (3)	Oakden
14:30	Irabona 44', 57'; Halliday 90+1'	Report	Tredrea 18', 35'	Stadium: Adelaide City Park

24 April	Northern Demons (4)	0–4	Croydon Kings	Port Pirie
14:30		Report	Munro 22'; Caraccia 63'; Benedetti 65'; Stefanopoulos 84'	Stadium: Byrne Park

24 April	Adelaide Comets (2)	9–1	Mount Barker United (4)	Adelaide
14:30	Beric 18', 21', 60'; Andijanto 34'; Lobasso 47'; Mavrolambados 52'; Keramidas 65'; Diamantis 70'; Dimou 88'	Report	Pienaar 25'	Stadium: Park 24

24 April	White City Woodville (3)	5–0	Pembroke Old Scholars (5)	Woodville West
14:30	Markham 20', 53', 57'; Jones 24'; Tobias 71'	Report		Stadium: Frank Mitchell Park

24 April	Adelaide Victory (3)	3–2	Adelaide Croatia Raiders (2)	Blair Athol
14:30	Talladira 48'; Cash 49'; Ueda 88'	Report	Mullen 16'; Kirk 30' (pen.)	Stadium: Rushworth Reserve

24 April	Sturt Lions (2)	2–0	Cumberland United (2)	West Beach
14:30	Mullins 59'; Rodriguez 89'	Report		Stadium: West Beach Parks Football Centre

24 April	West Torrens Birkalla (3)	0–2	North Eastern MetroStars (2)	Novar Gardens
15:00		Report	Zafridis 68'; Melisi 90+5'	Stadium: Jack Smith Park

24 April	South Adelaide Panthers (2)	0–2	Campbelltown City (2)	O'Sullivan Beach
15:00		Report	Centofanti 54'; Williams 87'	Stadium: O'Sullivan Beach Sports and Community Centre

24 April	Playford City Patriots (3)	2–1	Adelaide Blue Eagles (2)	Edinburgh North
15:00	Kurtz 6'; Ryan 45'	Report	Matsumoto 8'	Stadium: Ramsay Park

24 April	The Cove (4)	1–2 (a.e.t.)	Fulham United (3)	Hallett Cove
18:00	Moon 9'	Report	Mittiga 56'; Takos 118'	Stadium: Cove Sports and Community Centre

24 April	Adelaide Olympic (2)	1–0	Adelaide University (4)	Angle Park
18:00	Konstandopoulos 62'	Report		Stadium: VALO Football Centre

24 April	Port Adelaide Pirates (4)	4–2	West Adelaide (3)	Taperoo
19:00	Skirving 5'; Watson 21', 31'; Teymouri 76'	Report	Moran 55'; Amanatidis 90+5'	Stadium: Ngarrpadla Josie Agius Reserve

Ghan Kilburn City (-)	Walkover	Salisbury United (4)

== Third round ==
The third round of the Federation Cup was also the fifth round of the 2021 FFA Cup preliminary rounds.

All times are in ACST

14 May	Elizabeth Downs (-)	0–3	Playford City Patriots (3)	Elizabeth Downs
19:30		Report	Farrell 18'; Ajak 61'; Ryan 65'	Stadium: Argana Park

15 May	Adelaide Comets (2)	4–0	Adelaide Victory (3)	Mile End
14:30	Welsh 35', 45'; Mavrolambados 57'; Lobasso 83'	Report		Stadium: SA Athletics Stadium

15 May	White City Woodville (3)	2–3	Adelaide City (2)	Woodville West
14:30	Natsiopoulos 12'; Markham 20'	Report	Kasumovic 13', 68'; Irabona 84'	Stadium: Frank Mitchell Park

15 May	Modbury Jets (3)	0–1	Sturt Lions (2)	Ridgehaven
14:30		Report	Rodriguez 72' (pen.)	Stadium: Smith Partners Stadium

15 May	Salisbury United (4)	1–1 (a.e.t.) (4–5 p)	Croydon Kings (2)	Burton
14:30	McDevitt 47'	Report	Stefanopoulos 32'	Stadium: Steve Jarvis Park

15 May	Campbelltown City (2)	3–0	Port Adelaide Pirates (4)	Newton
14:30	Williams 8'; Marino 32', 90+3'	Report		Stadium: Steve Woodcock Sports Centre

15 May	Fulham United (3)	1–3	Adelaide Olympic (2)	West Beach
14:30	Tsialafos 90+3'	Report	Bontor 27'; Jones 40'; Pounendis 75'	Stadium: West Beach Parks Football Centre

16 May	Brahma Lodge (-)	3–5	North Eastern MetroStars (2)	Brahma Lodge
14:30	Thornton 3'; Crescenzi 74'; Butler 90+2'	Report	Smith 64', 94'; Gow 76'; Esposito 89'; Piol 107'	Stadium: Cockburn Green

== Quarter-finals ==
The quarter-finals of the Federation Cup was also the sixth round of the 2021 FFA Cup preliminary rounds.

All times are in ACST

8 June	Sturt Lions (2)	2–4	Adelaide City (2)	West Beach
19:00	Atkinson 54'; Sortini 80'	Report	Kasumovic 6', 22'; Irabona 24'; Devereux 32'	Stadium: West Beach Parks Football Centre

8 June	Campbelltown City (2)	4–1	Adelaide Comets (2)	Newton
19:30	Mullen 7'; Marino 12', 73'; Ditroia 16'	Report	Diamantis 22'	Stadium: Steve Woodcock Sports Centre

8 June	North Eastern MetroStars (2)	5–2	Playford City Patriots (3)	Klemzig
19:30	Gow 17'; Solagna 23'; Kamara 45+2'; Mori 74'; Melisi 89'	Report	Kurtz 19'; Mullen 90+3'	Stadium: T.K. Shutter Reserve

9 June	Adelaide Olympic (2)	2–0	Croydon Kings (2)	Angle Park
19:30	Simosis 68', 75'	Report		Stadium: VALO Football Centre

== Semi-finals ==
The semi-finals of the Federation Cup was also the seventh round of the 2021 FFA Cup preliminary rounds, with the two winners qualifying for the 2021 FFA Cup.

All times are in ACST

22 June	Adelaide Olympic (2)	1–0	Campbelltown City (2)	Angle Park
19:30	Cittadini 54'	Report		Stadium: VALO Football Centre

23 June	Adelaide City (2)	2–0	North Eastern MetroStars (2)	Angle Park
19:30	Bucco 55'; Costa 64'	Report		Stadium: VALO Football Centre

== Final ==
14 July
19:30 ACST

Adelaide Olympic	2–1	Adelaide City
Konstandopoulos 67'; Erba 87'	Report	Bucco 53'

VALO Football Centre, Angle Park
Attendance: 1,240
Referee: Daniel Goodwin

== See also ==
- 2021 Football South Australia season
