= 2020 Football South Australia season =

Football South Australia
- Season: 2020

The 2020 Football South Australia season was the 114th season of soccer in South Australia, and the eighth under the National Premier Leagues format.

All NPL and grassroots competitions were suspended for one month due to the impacts from the COVID-19 pandemic in Australia, effective 18 March to 14 April, and subsequently extended. Competitions were able to be resumed effective 25 June, subject to conditions. The South Australian season was temporarily suspended in mid-November for a minimum of two weeks, with the NPLSA in the middle of its finals series.

== Men's Competitions ==
=== 2020 National Premier Leagues South Australia ===
NPL South Australia
- Season: 2020
- Dates: 21 February–11 December
- Champions: Campbelltown City
- Premiers: Adelaide Comets
- Relegated: Modbury Jets; Para Hills Knights
- Matches: 132
- Goals: 387 (2.93 per match)
- Top goalscorer: Allan Welsh (18 Goals)

The 2020 National Premier Leagues South Australia was the eighth season of soccer under the competition format in South Australia. It is the first tier of South Australian soccer and the second tier of Australian soccer. Each team plays each other twice, resulting in 22 rounds. The season began on 21 February and was suspended from 14 March to 27 June, due to the COVID-19 pandemic in Australia, with the regular season resuming on 3 July, and further suspended on 17 November. The Premier was planned to compete in the 2020 National Premier Leagues finals series, however the competition was cancelled in July.

==== League table ====
Pos	Team	Pld	W	D	L	GF	GA	GD	Pts	Qualification or relegation
1	Adelaide Comets	22	14	2	6	45	24	+21	44	Qualification for Finals
2	Campbelltown City (C)	22	13	4	5	36	27	+9	43	Qualification for Finals
3	North Eastern MetroStars	22	12	5	5	52	32	+20	41	Qualification for Finals
4	Croydon Kings	22	11	3	8	42	32	+10	36	Qualification for Finals
5	Adelaide Raiders	22	9	7	6	30	27	+3	34	Qualification for Finals
6	Adelaide City	22	8	7	7	27	23	+4	31	Qualification for Finals
7	Cumberland United	22	9	4	9	31	43	−12	31	
8	Adelaide Olympic	22	8	4	10	32	32	0	28	
9	Adelaide Blue Eagles	22	6	9	7	25	27	−2	27	
10	Adelaide United Youth	22	5	9	8	26	30	−4	24	
11	Modbury Jets (R)	22	4	4	14	23	48	−25	16	Relegation to SA State League 1
12	Para Hills Knights (R)	22	3	2	17	18	42	−24	11	Relegation to SA State League 1

Source: mygameday
Rules for classification: 1) points; 2) goal difference; 3) number of goals scored.
(C) Champions; (R) Relegated

==== Finals ====
Elimination finals
4	Croydon Kings	2
5	Adelaide Raiders	0
3	North Eastern MetroStars	1
6	Adelaide City	4

Semifinals
1	Adelaide Comets	0	3
2	Campbelltown City	0	0
4	Croydon Kings	1
6	Adelaide City	3

Preliminary final
2	Campbelltown City	4
6	Adelaide City	0

Grand final
1	Adelaide Comets	1
2	Campbelltown City	3

=== 2020 State League 1 South Australia ===
(South Australia) State League 1
- Season: 2020
- Champions: Sturt Lions
- Premiers: South Adelaide Panthers
- Promoted: South Adelaide Panthers; Sturt Lions

Similar to the previous year, promotion to the 2021 NPL is awarded to the Premiers (highest placed team during the regular season), as well as the Champions (winner of the Grand Final). The finals series was suspended on 17 November.

==== League table ====
Pos	Team	Pld	W	D	L	GF	GA	GD	Pts	Qualification or relegation
1	South Adelaide Panthers (P)	22	14	7	1	62	26	+36	49	Promoted to the 2021 National Premier Leagues SA
2	Sturt Lions (C, P)	22	13	6	3	48	18	+30	45	Promoted to the 2021 National Premier Leagues SA
3	West Adelaide	22	14	3	5	54	33	+21	45	2020 SA State League 1 Finals
4	White City Woodville	22	12	6	4	42	27	+15	42	2020 SA State League 1 Finals
5	Playford City Patriots	22	12	2	8	37	27	+10	38	2020 SA State League 1 Finals
6	Western Strikers	22	10	3	9	38	38	0	33	2020 SA State League 1 Finals
7	Adelaide Hills Hawks	22	10	2	10	42	43	−1	32	
8	West Torrens Birkalla	22	8	5	9	49	49	0	29	
9	Fulham United	22	6	4	12	31	38	−7	22	
10	Adelaide Victory	22	5	3	14	42	65	−23	18	
11	Adelaide Vipers (R)	22	4	4	14	27	56	−29	16	Relegated to the 2021 SA State League 2
12	Seaford Rangers (R)	22	0	3	19	27	79	−52	3	Relegated to the 2021 SA State League 2

Source: sportstg.com
Rules for classification: 1) points; 2) goal difference; 3) number of goals scored.
(C) Champions; (P) Promoted; (R) Relegated

==== Finals ====
Elimination finals
3	South Adelaide Panthers	4
6	Sturt Lions	3
4
5

Semifinals
1	South Adelaide Panthers	0
2	Sturt Lions	3
West Adelaide	1
White City Woodville	2

Preliminary final
South Adelaide Panthers	1
White City Woodville	3

Grand final
Sturt Lions	2
White City Woodville	0

=== 2020 State League 2 South Australia ===
(South Australia) State League 2
- Season: 2020
- Champions: Eastern United
- Premiers: Adelaide Cobras
- Promoted: Adelaide Cobras; Eastern United

Similar to the previous year, promotion to the 2021 SL1 is awarded to the Premiers (highest placed team during the regular season), as well as the Champions (winner of the Grand Final). The finals series was suspended on 17 November.

==== League table ====
Pos	Team	Pld	W	D	L	GF	GA	GD	Pts	Qualification or relegation
1	Adelaide Cobras (P)	22	14	4	4	48	29	+19	46	Promoted to the 2021 SA State League 1
2	Eastern United (C, P)	22	13	5	4	51	28	+23	44	Promoted to the 2021 SA State League 1
3	Modbury Vista	22	15	3	4	57	27	+30	42 (Note: Following a sanction by the independent Disciplinary Committee, Modbury Vista had 6 competition points removed for the 2020 season, after a disturbance in a match against Gawler.)	2020 SA State League 2 Finals
4	Port Adelaide Pirates	22	11	3	8	45	33	+12	36	2020 SA State League 2 Finals
5	Adelaide University	22	10	5	7	43	41	+2	35	2020 SA State League 2 Finals
6	Gawler SC	22	11	3	8	51	38	+13	33 (Note: Following a sanction by the independent Disciplinary Committee, Gawler SC had 3 competition points removed for the 2020 season, after a disturbance in a match against Modbury Vista.)	2020 SA State League 2 Finals
7	Noarlunga United	22	9	5	8	38	37	+1	32	
8	Pontian Eagles	22	8	5	9	41	40	+1	29	
9	The Cove	22	8	5	9	34	35	−1	29	
10	Northern Demons	22	6	2	14	28	47	−19	20	
11	Salisbury United	22	6	1	15	39	49	−10	19	
12	Mount Barker United	22	0	1	21	18	89	−71	1	

Source: sportstg.com
Rules for classification: 1) points; 2) goal difference; 3) number of goals scored.
(C) Champions; (P) Promoted

==== Finals ====
Elimination finals
3	Adelaide Cobras	3
6	Eastern United	2
4
5

Semifinals
1	Adelaide Cobras	3
2	Eastern United	3
Gawler SC	2
Adelaide University	0

Preliminary final
Eastern United	3
Gawler SC	2

Grand final
Adelaide Cobras	0
Eastern United (a.e.t.)	1

== Women's Competitions ==
=== 2020 Women's National Premier Leagues South Australia ===
PS4 WNPL South Australia
- Season: 2020
- Champions: Metro United
- Premiers: Adelaide City

The highest tier domestic football competition in South Australia for women was known for sponsorship reasons as the PS4 Women's National Premier League. This was the fifth season of the NPL format. The 8 teams played a double round-robin for a total of 14 games. After three months off due to the impacts from the COVID-19 pandemic, the season resumed on 26 June.

==== League table ====
Pos	Team	Pld	W	D	L	GF	GA	GD	Pts	Qualification or relegation
1	Adelaide City	14	13	0	1	75	14	+61	39	2020 Women's NPL Finals
2	Salisbury Inter	14	10	1	3	50	24	+26	31	2020 Women's NPL Finals
3	West Adelaide	14	9	1	4	39	17	+22	28	2020 Women's NPL Finals
4	Metro United (C)	14	8	0	6	19	28	−9	24	2020 Women's NPL Finals
5	FFSA NTC	14	4	3	7	19	34	−15	15	
6	Fulham United	14	4	0	10	16	50	−34	12	
7	Adelaide University	14	2	2	10	12	35	−23	8	
8	Adelaide Comets	14	1	3	10	14	42	−28	6	

Source: sportstg.com
Rules for classification: 1) points; 2) goal difference; 3) number of goals scored.
(C) Champions

==== Finals ====
Semi-finals
1	Adelaide City	3
2	Salisbury Inter	1
3	West Adelaide	0
4	Metro United	1

Elimination Final
Salisbury Inter	2
Metro United (a.e.t.)	3

Grand Final
Adelaide City	1
Metro United	2

== Cup Competitions ==
=== 2020 Federation Cup ===
2020 FSA Federation Cup
Tournament details
- Dates: 20 March–20 June (Scheduled); Suspended 18 March
- Teams: 54; 44 were drawn in the first round

The 2020 Football South Australia Federation Cup, also known as the 2020 FFA Cup South Australian preliminary rounds until the semi-finals, was scheduled to be the 108th running of the Federation Cup, the main soccer knockout cup competition in South Australia. The competition was set to function as part of the 2020 FFA Cup preliminary rounds, with the two finalists qualifying for the main knockout competition, prior to its cancellation.

The first round was drawn on 5 March. The competition was suspended on 18 March, two days before its commencement, due to the COVID-19 pandemic in Australia.
