= James Coutts (footballer) =

English footballer and manager

Personal information
- Full name: James Ryan Coutts
- Date of birth: 15 April 1987 (age 39)
- Place of birth: Weymouth, England
- Position: Midfielder

Senior career*
Years	Team	Apps	(Gls)
2004–2007	AFC Bournemouth	12	(0)
2006	→ Grays Athletic (loan)	1	(0)
2007	→ Weymouth (loan)	21	(3)
2007–2009	Weymouth	73	(9)
2009	Newport County	4	(0)
2010–2011	Dorchester Town	23	(0)
2011–2012	AFC Totton	19	(4)
2011	→ Weymouth (loan)	4	(1)
2012	Gosport Borough	0	(0)
2012–2013	AFC Totton	22	(5)
2014–2015	Twin City Wanderers		
2015–2017	Murray United	25	(5)
2018	Gold Coast United	8	(1)
2018–2019	North Geelong Warriors	29	(1)
2020–2021	Logan Lightning	38	(3)

Managerial career
- 2015–2017: Murray United
- 2018–2019: North Geelong Warriors
- * Club domestic league appearances and goals

James Ryan Coutts (born 15 April 1987) is an English footballer and manager who was most recently a player-coach at National Premier Leagues Victoria 2 side North Geelong Warriors FC.

== Career ==
Coutts started his career at AFC Bournemouth and spent time on loan at Grays Athletic and Weymouth. He signed for Weymouth after being released by Bournemouth in 2007. He left Weymouth after they were relegated to the Conference South in May 2009 at the end of the 2008–09 season. Coutt's returned to Weymouth on loan from AFC Totton in December 2011. He returned to his parent club at the end of January.

Coutts signed for Conference South leaders Newport County on 4 December 2009, before his release on 1 January 2010. He joined Dorchester Town on 9 January.

Having made 23 appearances for Dorchester, Coutts joined AFC Totton ahead of the 2011–12 season; there he made 19 appearances, scoring four goals - however, he was loaned out to Weymouth during the season - scoring in their New Year's Eve win over St Albans City. At the season's conclusion, Coutts joined newly promoted Southern League Premier Division side Gosport Borough.

Coutts wasn't included on the bench for Gosport's opening game of the season against Barwell, and later re-signed for AFC Totton on 20 August 2012. He was in the starting eleven for The Stags' league match against Chesham United the day after he signed. Coutts scored his first goal of his second spell with Totton in a 4–2 defeat to Stourbridge on 25 August.

After moving to Australia and playing for Albury Wodonga Football Association amateur side Twin City Wanderers in Victoria, Coutts signed for the newly created semi-professional outfit Murray United for the 2015 National Premier Leagues Victoria 1 season. Coutts departed Murray in October 2017 to take up a role with Gold Coast United FC.

In May 2018, Coutts moved back to Victoria to take up a role as senior head coach and player of National Premier Leagues Victoria 2 side North Geelong Warriors FC. In his first half-season, Coutts led North Geelong to a third-placed finish. In August 2019, North Geelong announced that Coutts would be leaving the club at season's end to return to Queensland.
