= Bugeja =

Bugeja is a surname originating in the Mediterranean island of Malta. Several locations have the placename According to Cassar the first recorded use was in 1417, a Militia List includes Pinu Bugeja. Old variations are Bugeia, Bugia, Bugeya, Bugeija and Bogeia. The surname can be found in Greece as well, due to immigration, in other variations such as Boutzegia(s) (in Greek Μπουτζέγιας). One theory states that Bugeja comes from the name of the seaport known as Bougie in the department of Constantine (Algeria). Another states that the surname may be a Maltese form of Sicilian Bug(G)Ea from Greek Boukaios ‘Cowherd Herdsman’ or from Buggia, Salentine And Sicilian Dialects. This explanation may have more merit in as much as the Bugeja coat of arms features a cow under a six-pointed star.

== Notable persons with that surname ==
- Aaron Bugeja, Maltese judge
- Alicia Bugeja Said (born 1987), Maltese politician
- Chad Bugeja - Australian soccer player
- Cordelia Bugeja - British actress, best known for her roles as Melanie Hart in the soap opera Family Affairs
- Danny Bugeja - guitarist, member of Gibraltarian pop rock band Taxi
- David Bugeja - guitarist, member of Maltese Death metal band Beheaded.
