= Edge Hill United FC =

Australian soccer club

Edge Hill United
- Full name: Edge Hill United Football Club
- Nickname: Tigers
- Founded: 1967
- Ground: Tiger Park
- League: Far North Queensland Premier League
- Website: https://ehufc.com.au/

Edge Hill United FC is an Australian football club based in the Cairns, Queensland that plays in the fifth-tier Far North Queensland Premier League.

== Club information ==
Edge Hill United FC was founded in 1967.

In 2019 and 2020, both their men's and women's sides have been dominant teams in the community divisions of Far North Queensland winning back-to-back trebles.

In 2021, they qualified for the FFA Cup as a fifth tier side, after defeating second tier NPL Queensland side Magpies Crusaders United in the final round of qualifying by a score of 3–1, becoming the only community club to advance to the Final Rounds of the 2021 FFA Cup. They were defeated 2–0 in the Round of 32 by second-tier NPL Queensland side Gold Coast Knights after allowing two late goals.

== Notable players ==
- (Australia) Frank Farina
- (Japan) Takuya Iwata
- (Papua New Guinea) Nathaniel Lepani
- (Australia) Shane Stefanutto
- (Australia) Michael Thwaite
- (Australia) Thomas Waddingham
