= Chad Bugeja =

Australian soccer player

Personal information
- Full name: Chad Bugeja
- Date of birth: 28 April 1981 (age 45)
- Place of birth: Broken Hill, Australia
- Height: 1.73 m (5 ft 8 in)
- Position: Striker

Team information
- Current team: Modbury Vista

Senior career*
Years	Team	Apps	(Gls)
2002–2008	White City	100	(61)
2005–2006	Adelaide United	9	(0)
2009	Adelaide City	14	(3)
2010–2013	Adelaide Blue Eagles	55	(19)
2014–2015	White City	40	(10)
2017–2019	Murray United	15	(4)
2019–2022	Brahma Lodge SC		
2022	Modbury Vista	16	(9)
- * Club domestic league appearances and goals as of 19 August 2022 ‡ National team caps and goals as of 19 May 2007

Chad Bugeja (born 28 April 1981 in Broken Hill, New South Wales, Australia) is a former Australian professional footballer.

== Biography ==
He played as a striker for Adelaide United in the A-League's inaugural season, but was released in the close season. He was with White City until the 2008 super league season and was transferred to Adelaide City FC. He later moved to Adelaide Blue Eagles for the 2010 season, scoring 10 goals in the pre-season cup. By 2013, Bugeja split coaching and playing duties with Blue Eagles. He then joined Murray United in Melbourne and after 3 years he moved back to Adelaide to play for Brahma Lodge. He currently plays for Modbury Vista SC in the State League 2.

== See also ==
Bugeja (surname)
