= Modbury Vista SC =

Modbury Vista
- Full name: Modbury Vista Soccer Club
- Nickname: Vista
- Founded: 1973; 53 years ago
- Stadium: Newspot Stadium
- Chairman: Tom Coombe
- Manager: Jonathan Negus
- League: SA State League 2 North
- 2025: SA State League 2 North, 1st of 8
- Website: https://mvsc.com.au/

Modbury Vista Soccer Club is a semi-professional soccer club based in Wynn Vale, a north-eastern suburb of Adelaide. The club was founded in 1973, out of the Para Vista Soccer Club founded four years earlier. Initially playing in the South Australian Amateur Soccer League, the club joined the Federation ahead of the 2017 season. The club currently plays in State League 2 South Australia, in the fourth tier of Australian soccer. Originally playing at Kelly Road in Modbury North, the club has been based out of their current home ground, Newspot Stadium at Richardson Drive, since 1991.

== Players ==
=== Current squad ===
Squad correct as of February 2023.

No.	Pos.	Nation	Player
1	GK	AUS	Kieran Griffiths
2	DF	AUS	Lachlan Kusabs
3	DF	AUS	Alex Cole
4	DF	AUS	Josh Coyne
5		AUS	Josh Beagley
6	MF	AUS	Marc Cocca
7	MF	AUS	Jack Ward
8	MF	AUS	Andy Dyer
9	FW	AUS	Benjamin Trotta
10	DF	AUS	Jonathan Negus
67	CB	AUS	Dion Kirk

No.	Pos.	Nation	Player
11	FW	AUS	Alexei Essex
12	MF	AUS	Tyson Linsenmeier
13	DF	AUS	John Tamba
14	DF	AUS	Brayden Hogarth
15	MF	AUS	Nikola Groshi
17	MF	AUS	Benjamin Head
18	DF	AUS	Jay Crescenzi
23	FW	AUS	Chad Bugeja
30	GK	AUS	Bradley Martin
77	MF	AUS	Louis Morgan

== Seasons ==
Season	League											Cup	
Season	Division (Tier)	Pld	W	D	L	GF	GA	GD	Pts	Pos	Finals	Cup	
2017	SL2 (4)	22	3	3	16	29	92	−63	12	10th	—	Federation	R2
2018	SL2 (4)	22	2	1	19	18	85	−67	7	10th	—	Federation	R1
2019	SL2 (4)	22	2	4	16	22	61	−39	10	11th	—	Federation	R1
2020	SL2 (4)	22	15	3	4	57	27	+30	42 (Note: Deducted 6 points in 2020)	3rd	EF	—	
2021	SL2 (4)	22	4	4	14	32	58	−26	16	11th	—	Federation	R1
2022	SL2 (4)	22	7	3	12	43	50	−7	24	8th	—	Federation	R2
2023	SL2 (4)	22	10	5	7	44	34	+10	35	4th	SF	Federation	R2
