= Mackay & Whitsundays Magpies Crusaders United =

- Full name: Mackay & Whitsundays Magpies Crusaders United FC
- Nicknames: Magpies Crusaders, MCU
- Founded: 2017
- Ground: Sologinkin Oval, Mackay
- Capacity: 6000
- Chairman: Barry Jensen
- Manager: Jamie Dunning
- League: None
- 2022: 5th of 11 Queensland Premier League
- Website: https://www.magpiescrusaders.com.au
Home colours

Mackay & Whitsundays Magpies Crusaders United Football Club, also known as Magpies Crusaders FC, is an Australian professional association football club based in Mackay, Queensland. The club was established in 2017 as an amalgamation of Magpies Sporting Club and Mackay Crusaders Football Club.

Magpies Crusaders represents the Mackay & Whitsundays region in the Queensland Premier League competition. In 2020, they withdrew from the NPL during the mid-season hiatus caused by the COVID-19 pandemic in Australia.

In mid-2022 the Mackay & Whitsundays Magpies Crusaders United Football Club (MCU) will not continue to participate in the South East Queensland conference of the Football Queensland Premier League 1 (FQPL 1) beyond 2022.

== Club history ==
Magpies Crusaders made their competitive debut in the 2018 National Premier Leagues Queensland competition, finishing in 11th place in the 14-team competition.

Crusaders made their FFA Cup debut in 2019, defeating Coomera Colts 2–1 on 24 July 2019.

== Current squad ==
2022 season squad. Updated to 12 March 2022

Note: Flags indicate national team as defined under FIFA eligibility rules; some limited exceptions apply. Players may hold more than one non-FIFA nationality.

No.	Pos.	Nation	Player
1	GK	AUS	Ethan Reed
2	DF	AUS	Zac Cavali
3	DF	AUS	Jayden Bell
4	DF	JPN	Junya Yabe
5	DF	AUS	Daniel Simic
6	DF	RWA	Jean-Delors Tuyishime
7	MF	AUS	Makhaya Quakawoot
8	FW	AUS	Angus McKenzie
9	FW	ENG	Michael Lyall
10	MF	AUS	Diego Cuba
11	MF	AUS	Anthony Goweid
12	DF	AUS	Angus Huang
13	MF	AUS	Brandon Callaghan

No.	Pos.	Nation	Player
14	MF	AUS	Jayden Salam
15	MF	AUS	Denzel Bobongie
16	MF	AUS	Harry Black
17	DF	AUS	Benjamin Binney
18	FW	AUS	Aref Nazary
19	DF	AUS	Kougha Dunkerley
20	MF	AUS	Liam Shipton (captain)
21	GK	AUS	Harrison Myers
22	MF	AUS	Jaymayne Salam
23	DF	AUS	Kieran Waters
24	FW	AUS	Ashton Smith
25	DF	AUS	Malachi Kennell
