= MyBudget =

Australian financial services company

- Type: Private
- Industry: Financial services
- Founded: 1999
- Founder: Tammy Barton
- Headquarters: Adelaide, South Australia
- Key people: Tammy Barton
- Services: Personal Budgeting

MyBudget is an Australian financial services company based in Adelaide, South Australia, which provides personal budget management services to Australia and New Zealand.

== History ==
Tamara Jill Barton (née Monaghan; formerly May) started MyBudget as a home-based business in Adelaide in 1999 at the age of 22 after working at a debt collection agency. On 26 October 2012, Barton was appointed to the BankSA Advisory Board, however, she remains director of and spokesperson for MyBudget.

== Product ==
MyBudget provides a personal budgeting service which analyses a client's finances, including income, expenses and debt. The budgeting system works by ranking each bill in order of priority categories, from those which are the highest, such as living expenses and mortgage repayments, to those with a lower priority.

== Criticism and malware ==
In December 2013, MyBudget was named in a national current affairs television report as "profiteering at the expense of people who are struggling with debt". MyBudget issued a statement responding to the report, claiming that "the segment was an unbalanced attack on our industry and that many of the comments made are inaccurate".

In 2017, MyBudget was the object of a class action due to withholding interest accrued by clients. In September 2018, the courts dismissed the proceedings, with Judge Lee stating that "MyBudget obtains and suffers the pluses and minuses of the bank accounts necessary to discharge its obligations to provide the services," and, in addition, "The Provision did not cause an overall detriment, financial or otherwise, to clients".

In May 2020, MyBudget was the confirmed target of a cyberattack. As a result, the company quickly moved its employees into work-from-home arrangements amid the coronavirus outbreak. Automatic transfers were interrupted, but progressed manually. Customers expressed concerns as to whether the significant personal data held by MyBudget had been leaked or hacked. Later, hackers claimed to have stolen data from MyBudget using ransomware and threatened to publish it unless paid. During the ransomware attack "users were unable to view their account balance for at least seven days." In a statement to the media on 15 May 2020, MyBudget stated that there was "no credible evidence that significant data was accessed or will be misused [h]owever we can't rule this out and are taking all cautionary measures".

== Awards ==
MyBudget's industry recognition is primarily attributed to its founder, Tammy Barton (formerly Tammy May), who has been acknowledged by various Australian business organizations for her entrepreneurship and female leadership in the financial services sector.

Awards and recognition received by founder Tammy Barton
Year	Awarding body	Award category	Result	Ref.
2017	SmartCompany	Top 30 Female Entrepreneurs	Listed	
2017	Telstra Business Women's Awards	South Australian Business Woman of the Year	State Winner	
2017	League of Extraordinary Women	Female Entrepreneur of the Year	Recipient	
2016	League of Extraordinary Women	Female Entrepreneur of the Year	Recipient	
2015	League of Extraordinary Women	Female Entrepreneur of the Year	Recipient	
2012	Australian Financial Review	100 Women of Influence (Young Entrepreneur)	Honouree	
2008	Ernst & Young Entrepreneur of the Year Award	Young Entrepreneur of the Year (Central Region)	Regional Winner	
2007	Telstra Business Women's Awards	South Australian Business Woman of the Year	State Winner	
