= 2021 Football South Australia season =

Football South Australia
- Season: 2021

The 2021 Football South Australia season was the 115th season of soccer in South Australia, and the ninth under the National Premier Leagues format.

The men's competitions consisted of three major divisions across the State. The season commenced on 9 April, and finished with the State League 2 Grand final on 20 October, the State League 1 Grand final on 21 October, and the NPL Grand final on 22 October.

== Men's Competitions ==
=== 2021 National Premier Leagues South Australia ===
NPL South Australia
- Season: 2021
- Dates: 9 April–22 October
- Champions: Adelaide City (18th title)
- Premiers: Adelaide Comets (2nd title)
- Matches: 132
- Goals: 417 (3.16 per match)
- Top goalscorer: Marc Marino (13 Goals)
- Biggest home win: Adelaide City 5–0 Cumberland United (19 June 2021)
- Biggest away win: Cumberland United 0–4 South Adelaide Panthers (7 August 2021)
- Highest scoring: Adelaide Croatia Raiders 4–4 South Adelaide Panthers (13 August 2021)

The 2021 National Premier League South Australia, known as the RAA National Premier League for sponsorship reasons, was the ninth season of soccer under the competition format in South Australia. It is the first tier of South Australian soccer and the second tier of Australian soccer The Premier qualifies for the 2021 National Premier Leagues finals series. The fixtures were released on 5 March.

==== League Table ====
Pos	Team	Pld	W	D	L	GF	GA	GD	Pts	Qualification or relegation
1	Adelaide Comets	22	12	7	3	40	26	+14	43	Qualification for Finals
2	Adelaide City (C)	22	11	8	3	40	20	+20	41	Qualification for Finals
3	Campbelltown City	22	10	5	7	41	28	+13	35	Qualification for Finals
4	North Eastern MetroStars	22	9	6	7	36	26	+10	33	Qualification for Finals
5	Sturt Lions	22	9	6	7	34	34	0	33	Qualification for Finals
6	South Adelaide Panthers	22	9	5	8	38	36	+2	32	Qualification for Finals
7	Adelaide Olympic	22	6	11	5	37	33	+4	29	
8	Croydon FC	22	7	8	7	29	30	−1	29	
9	Adelaide United Youth	22	7	4	11	34	45	−11	25	
10	Cumberland United	22	7	4	11	28	45	−17	25	
11	Adelaide Croatia Raiders (R)	22	6	4	12	33	48	−15	22	Relegation to SA State League 1
12	Adelaide Blue Eagles (R)	22	3	4	15	27	46	−19	13	Relegation to SA State League 1

Source: mygameday
Rules for classification: 1) points; 2) goal difference; 3) number of goals scored.
(C) Champions; (R) Relegated

==== Finals ====
Elimination finals
4	North Eastern MetroStars	0 (3)
5	Sturt Lions (p)	0 (4)
3	Campbelltown City	1
6	South Adelaide Panthers	3

Semifinals
2	Adelaide City	0	3
1	Adelaide Comets	1	1
5	Sturt Lions (p)	2 (6)
6	South Adelaide Panthers	2 (5)

Preliminary final
1	Adelaide Comets (a.e.t.)	1
5	Sturt Lions	0

Grand final
2	Adelaide City (p)	0 (3)
1	Adelaide Comets	0 (2)

=== 2021 State League 1 South Australia ===
State League 1 South Australia
- Season: 2021
- Dates: 10 April–21 October
- Champions: White City
- Premiers: West Torrens Birkalla
- Matches: 132
- Goals: 355 (2.69 per match)
- Top goalscorer: Joshua Farrell (13 Goals)
- Biggest home win: West Torrens Birkalla 5–0 Eastern United (26 June 2021)
- Biggest away win: Eastern United 0–8 Playford City Patriots (8 May 2021)
- Highest scoring: Eastern United 0–8 Playford City Patriots (8 May 2021)

The 2021 State League 1 South Australia is the ninth season of soccer under the competition format in South Australia. It is the second tier of South Australian soccer and the third tier of Australian soccer. The fixtures were released on 5 March.

==== League Table ====
Pos	Team	Pld	W	D	L	GF	GA	GD	Pts	Qualification or relegation
1	West Torrens Birkalla (P)	22	14	3	5	45	19	+26	45	Promotion to National Premier Leagues SA and qualification for Finals
2	White City (C, P)	22	13	6	3	38	17	+21	45	Qualification for Finals
3	Modbury Jets	22	13	4	5	41	20	+21	43	Qualification for Finals
4	Playford City Patriots	22	12	3	7	38	23	+15	39	Qualification for Finals
5	Para Hills Knights	22	9	8	5	21	17	+4	35	Qualification for Finals
6	Adelaide Victory	22	8	7	7	28	27	+1	31	Qualification for Finals
7	Fulham United	22	8	2	12	23	35	−12	26	
8	Adelaide Hills Hawks	22	7	3	12	28	39	−11	24	
9	Eastern United	22	6	5	11	25	43	−18	23	
10	West Adelaide	22	7	2	13	22	40	−18	23	
11	Adelaide Cobras (R)	22	6	2	14	20	37	−17	20	Relegation to SA State League 2
12	Western Strikers (R)	22	4	5	13	26	38	−12	17	Relegation to SA State League 2

Source: mygameday
Rules for classification: 1) points; 2) goal difference; 3) number of goals scored.
(C) Champions; (P) Promoted; (R) Relegated

==== Finals ====
Elimination finals
3	Modbury Jets (p)	1 (5)
6	Adelaide Victory	1 (4)
4	Playford City Patriots	3
5	Para Hills Knights	0

Semifinals
2	White City	4	1
1	West Torrens Birkalla	0	1
3	Modbury Jets (p)	4 (5)
4	Playford City Patriots	4 (4)

Preliminary final
1	West Torrens Birkalla	2
3	Modbury Jets	1

Grand final
2	White City	2
1	West Torrens Birkalla	0

=== 2021 State League 2 South Australia ===
The 2021 State League 2 South Australia is the fifth season of soccer under the competition format in South Australia. It is the third tier of South Australian soccer and the fourth tier of Australian soccer. The fixtures were released on 5 March.

State League 2 South Australia
- Season: 2021
- Dates: 10 April–20 October
- Champions: University of Adelaide
- Premiers: Port Adelaide Pirates
- Matches: 132
- Top goalscorer: Anthony Dimas (30 Goals)
- Biggest home win: The Cove 9–0 Mount Barker United (25 August 2021)
- Biggest away win: Mount Barker United 0–8 Vipers FC (3 July 2021)
- Highest scoring: Vipers FC 7–6 Pontian Eagles (12 June 2021)

==== League Table ====
Pos	Team	Pld	W	D	L	GF	GA	GD	Pts	Qualification or relegation
1	Port Adelaide Pirates (P)	22	16	4	2	61	19	+42	52	Promotion to SA State League 1 and qualification for Finals
2	University of Adelaide (C, P)	22	16	3	3	47	18	+29	51	Qualification for Finals
3	Noarlunga United	22	12	7	3	48	23	+25	43	Qualification for Finals
4	Vipers FC	22	10	7	5	55	32	+23	37	Qualification for Finals
5	Seaford Rangers	22	11	2	9	36	36	0	35	Qualification for Finals
6	Salisbury United	22	9	6	7	45	26	+19	33	Qualification for Finals
7	Pontian Eagles	22	8	6	8	50	43	+7	30	
8	Gawler Eagles	22	8	6	8	41	34	+7	30	
9	Northern Demons	22	6	3	13	27	44	−17	21	
10	The Cove	22	5	5	12	39	51	−12	20	
11	Modbury Vista	22	4	4	14	32	58	−26	16	
12	Mount Barker United	22	0	1	21	13	110	−97	1	

Source: mygameday
Rules for classification: 1) points; 2) goal difference; 3) number of goals scored.
(C) Champions; (P) Promoted

==== Finals ====
Elimination finals
3	Noarlunga United (p)	3 (4)
6	Salisbury United	3 (1)
4	Vipers FC (p)	1 (3)
5	Seaford Rangers	1 (2)

Semifinals
1	Port Adelaide Pirates	1	0
2	University of Adelaide	3	1
3	Noarlunga United	0
4	Vipers FC	1

Preliminary final
1	Port Adelaide Pirates	0
4	Vipers FC	1

Grand final
2	University of Adelaide (p)	1 (5)
4	Vipers FC	1 (3)

== Cup Competitions ==
=== 2021 Federation Cup ===
2021 Federation Cup
Tournament details
- Dates: 24 March–14 July
- Teams: 52

Final positions
- Champions: Adelaide Olympic (2nd title)
- Runners-up: Adelaide City

The 2021 Football South Australia Federation Cup was the 108th running of the Federation Cup, the main soccer knockout competition in South Australia. The competition ran alongside the 2021 FFA Cup, with the two finalists qualifying for the competition. Teams from the National Premier Leagues South Australia, State League 1 South Australia, State League 2 South Australia. South Australian Collegiate Soccer League and South Australian Amateur Soccer League participated.

Adelaide Olympic were champions.

==== Bracket ====
First round Third preliminary round
The Cove	3
Noarlunga United	2
Modbury Vista	0
Adelaide University	3
Ghan Kilburn City	6
Adelaide Titans	1
Adelaide Redblue Eagles	2
Salisbury United	4
Northern Demons	1
Adelaide Thunder	0
Port Adelaide Pirates	4
Vipers FC	1
West Adelaide	4
Seaford Rangers	3
Cardijn Old Collegians	3
Mount Barker United	4
Adelaide Victory	3
Rostrevor Old Collegians	0
BOSA FC	4
Adelaide Uni Grads Blue	3
Modury Jets	2
Eastern United	1
White City	7
Unley Old Scholars	0
Pembroke Old Scholars	5
Old Ignatians	3
Adelaide Hills Hawks (a.e.t.)	3
Adelaide Cobras	2
USC Lion	0
Pontian Eagles	2
Brahma Lodge	11
Sacred Heart Old Collegians	0
Gawler Eagles	1
West Torrens Birkalla	2
Western Strikers	1
Elizabeth Downs	3
Messinian Association Hawks	0
Para Hills Knights	5
Playford City Patriots	6
Ingle Farm	0

Second round Fourth preliminary round
The Cove	1
Fulham United (a.e.t.)	2
Adelaide Olympic	1
Adelaide University	0
Ghan Kilburn City
Salisbury United	w/o
Northern Demons	0
Croydon FC	4
South Adelaide Panthers	0
Campbelltown City	2
Port Adelaide Pirates	4
West Adelaide	2
Adelaide Comets	9
Mount Barker United	1
Adelaide Victory	3
Adelaide Croatia Raiders	2
BOSA FC	1
Modbury Jets	5
Sturt Lions	2
Cumberland United	0
White City	5
Pembroke Old Scholars	0
Adelaide City	3
Adelaide Hills Hawks	2
Pontian Eagles	3
Brahma Lodge (a.e.t.)	4
West Torrens Birkalla	0
North Eastern MetroStars	2
Elizabeth Downs (a.e.t.)	3
Para Hills Knights	2
Playford City Patriots	2
Adelaide Blue Eagles	1

Third round Fifth preliminary round
Fulham United	1
Adelaide Olympic	3
Salisbury United	1 (4)
Croydon FC (p)	1 (5)
Campbelltown City	3
Port Adelaide Pirates	0
Adelaide Comets	4
Adelaide Victory	0
Modbury Jets	0
Sturt Lions	1
White City	2
Adelaide City	3
Brahma Lodge	3
North Eastern MetroStars (a.e.t.)	5
Elizabeth Downs	0
Playford City Patriots	3

Quarter-finals; Sixth preliminary round
Adelaide Olympic	2
Croydon FC	0
Campbelltown City	4
Adelaide Comets	1
Sturt Lions	2
Adelaide City	4
North Eastern MetroStars	5
Playford City Patriots	2

Semi-finals; Seventh preliminary round
Adelaide Olympic	1
Campbelltown City	0
Adelaide City	2
North Eastern MetroStars	0

Final
Adelaide Olympic	2
Adelaide City	1
