= Cardijn College =

- Noarlunga Downs, South Australia; Australia

Information
- Type: Independent
- Motto: See, Judge, Act
- Religious affiliation: Roman Catholic
- Established: January 27, 1984; 42 years ago
- Headmaster: Mr Steve Byrne
- Enrolment: 1,298 (2019)
- Campus: Marian Campus
- Colours: Maroon, blue, gold
- Affiliation: Sports Association for Adelaide Schools
- Website: cardijn.catholic.edu.au

Cardijn College is a private, independent Roman Catholic secondary co-educational day school located in the Southern Vales area approximately 25 kilometres (16 mi) south of the Adelaide city centre in South Australia. Established in 1984, it is a diocesan school with a student population of 1,300 in 2020. It is co-owned with Marcellin Technical College, which acts as the technical campus for Cardijn College.

== Name ==
The College derives its name from Belgian Priest and Cardinal Joseph Cardijn, known for his work founding the Young Christian Workers organisation. Cardijn's decision to spend his life bringing Christianity back to working class (through imprisonment for his activities, to the opposition of the movement from the Church itself), was an inspiration to many, and was considered a worthy title for the College.

== Campus ==
The College is surrounded by residential land and retail facilities, and is central to most transport and recreation facilities.

== Houses ==
Cardijn has eight houses with homegroups consisting of multi-gender same year students. For example, there are Year 7s in one homeroom, Year 9s in another, etc. There are 6 homerooms per house.

Upon commencement at the college, each student is assigned to one of the eight houses:

House name	Colour	Patron
Faulkner	Orange	Abp. Leonard Faulkner
Romero	White	St. Óscar Romero
Kolbe	Green	St. Maximilian Kolbe
Lombard	Red	Fr. Francis William Lombard
Mackillop	Yellow	St. Mary MacKillop
Chisholm	Blue	Caroline Chisholm
Mitchell	Purple	Hon. Dame Roma Mitchell
Chavoin	Pink	Jeanne-Marie Chavoin

== Curriculum ==
=== South Australian Certificate of education ===
The South Australian Certificate of Education (SACE) is the diploma given to students who have completed Years 11 and 12 of their secondary schooling in the State of South Australia. It is administered by the SACE Board of South Australia (formerly known as the Senior Secondary Assessment Board of South Australia or SSABSA). The SACE is usually completed over two years.

=== Vocational education and training ===
Cardijn College includes a range of vocational education pathways for students interested in this area. In 2011 over 42 students accessed a range of training courses offered through the TAFE SA, Australian Tourism Centre and Quality Automotive Training. Specific training included animal studies, make-up services, hairdressing, kitchen operations, game art, photography, graphic design, aged care nursing, vehicle servicing, construction, police studies and electrotechnology. 26 students were involved in school based new apprenticeships in retail, heavy vehicle servicing and automotive sales.

=== Marist Centre ===
The college has a special unit for students with intellectual disabilities. Students ranging from Year 8 to 12 have access to the centre, and have their program integrated with mainstream classes. In addition, the College has a Learning Centre which accommodates students with specific disabilities, learning disabilities and students who have been identified needing assistance academically.

=== Other endeavours ===
All Year 10 students are involved in Australian Business Week which is an intense one week enterprise education program giving participants an excellent view of the life of a business.

Year 11 students are involved in a one-week Work Experience Program which is supported by a range of work related study programs to best prepare students for this experience.

== College life and community ==
The school, although segregated into mixed age houses, has two distinct age brackets: the middle school and the senior school.

=== Middle school ===
An audit completed by Principal, Paul Rijken, and senior staff, saw the creation and implementation of a middle school strategy aimed at development of curriculum, pastoral care and achievement targets for students within the age bracket of 13–15 years old (Year 8 to 9). The overall intention of the revision was to create a system for students to migrate from the higher grades of primary school into the younger grades of high school with ease, to provide support to the students through this transition with a greater emphasis on curriculum integration.

=== Senior school ===
The senior school is composed of students roughly 15–18 years of age. These students participate in the South Australian Certificate of Education, within the Australian Qualifications Framework. The College allows more flexible study timetables and work allotments for these students, allowing them to liaise with teachers on curriculum, study hours and school contact hours (including after hours on-campus) to allow for the higher study load.

=== College Board ===
The Cardijn College Board has the responsibility of providing guidance to the Principal in governance and leadership of the school. The Board's responsibilities include strategic policy, direction and planning, financial management, community pastoral care, school resources, school maintenance and futures planning.

== Notable alumni ==
- Tammy Barton, entrepreneur and founder of MyBudget
- Sid Draper, Australian rules footballer
- Beau McCreery, Australian rules footballer
- Andrew Osborn, Australian Rules Footballer, Magarey Medallist
- Luke Schenscher, Basketballer Adelaide 36ers
- Rebekha Sharkie, Federal Politician (Member for Mayo)

== See also ==
- Vocational Education and Training
- SSABSA
