= Murray United FC =

Murray United
- Full name: Murray United Football Club
- Founded: 2014
- Ground: Baranduda Fields Sporting Complex
- Capacity: 5,000
- Chairman: Pedro Afonso
- League: Victorian State League 7
- 2026: 1st (promoted)
- Website: www.murrayunitedfc.com.au
Home colours	Away colours

Murray United FC is an Australian soccer club encapsulating NSW's Southern Riverina and North East Victoria. The club is based in Albury/Wodonga and current programs competes in the National Premier Leagues Victoria competition 4 teams of age U14, U15, U16, and U18; and Victorian State League senior first grade team. The club plays its home matches at the Baranduda Fields Sporting Complex.

== History ==
In early 2014, it was announced that an application had been submitted to Football Federation Victoria for a side under the name Border FC. The club was officially launched on 27 May 2014, as part of Australia's new look second tier of football, but under the name Murray United FC. The change of name was to capture all things synonymous with the region. Murray United FC will promote opportunities for those wanting to play high performance football from the local competition, the Albury Wodonga Football Association (AWFA), and will begin in the second tier of the NPL, the National Premier Leagues Victoria 2.

La Trobe University and Wodonga TAFE are the team's foundation sponsors.

On 29 September 2014, former Woking FC player & player/coach of local side Twin City Wanderers FC, Matt Gray, was appointed head coach for the inaugural year. This was short-lived however, with the region's player realising the demands of coaching and playing was too much, resigning in late December. He was replaced by dual code premiership coach Mick Richards, who won flags in the local AFL and soccer competitions.

On 31 October 2014, Murray United FC played their first match against external opposition, defeating Cobram Roar FC, a combined team of Cobram SC & Cobram Victory players seeking to participate in the AWFA next season. The final score was 7–0 to Murray United FC and was the last chance for players to impress before the 2015 squad announcement.

In a restructuring ahead of the 2015 season, the NPL2 division was divided into two parallel conferences with Murray United competing in the Eastern Conference.

Murray United played their first ever official game on 21 February 2015, going down 3–2 at La Trobe University to Box Hill United SC. Adam Waters and Zac Walker scored the goals. The club's first NPL2 point came the following week, drawing 1–1 with Springvale White Eagles FC at home. The club secured its first win of the season in Round 4 against Nunawading City FC, winning 2–1 through James Coutts and Zac Walker goals. The club entered a tumultuous period, losing five games in a row, including a 9–1 drubbing at the hands of Melbourne Victory FC Youth in Round 10. Late in the year, head manager Mick Richards resigned from his position, stating the toll on his family and business commitments as the primary reason. Murray United ended the season with 6 wins, 4 draws and 18 losses, finishing in 8th place in the NPL2 East division and 17th overall.

In April 2016, Murray United FC announced that former Socceroo Joshua Kennedy would be the club's ambassador. The following month, following a barren run of results, United confirmed the signing of former Salford City FC captain Chris Lynch, joining Ashley Dunn as the two Salford City alumni in the squad.

On 31 January 2017, Murray United announced the signing of former A-League legend Archie Thompson on a guest stint.

On 15 August 2019, senior head coach Elliot Jones announced he would be resigning at the end of the 2019 season and the following month Zac Walker announced that he would be retiring at the end of the season. Walker scored in the last game of the season, bowing out with 57 goals for Murray United, a club record. United finished the season in 8th place, enduring relegation to NPL3 for 2020.

In October 2019, Murray announced that it had appointed Igor Srbinovski as its new senior head coach on a two-year deal.

== Rivalries ==
Murray United has a rivalry with fellow North-East Victorian NPL team Goulburn Valley Suns FC, with both teams joining NPL Victoria in 2014 as regional expansion clubs.

== Competition timeline ==
Season	League													NPL Finals Series	Cup		
Season	Tier	Competition	Pld	W	D	L	GF	GA	+/-	Pts	Position	Finals	Playoffs	NPL Finals Series	FFA Cup	Dockerty Cup	Community Shield
2015	3	NPL V2E	28	6	4	18	38	80	−42	22	8th	-	-	-	5th Rd. Overall	5th Rd. Overall	-
2016	3	NPL V2E	28	3	5	20	28	68	−40	14	9th	-	-	-	7th Rd. Overall	7th Rd. Overall	-
2017	3	NPL V2E	28	11	6	11	49	41	+8	39	5th	-	-	-	6th Rd. Overall	6th Rd. Overall	-
2018	3	NPL V2E	28	8	4	16	35	49	−14	28	9th	-	-	-	7th Rd. Overall	7th Rd. Overall	-
2019	3	NPL V2E	28	10	4	14	50	64	−14	31	8th ↓	-	-	-	7th Rd. Overall	7th Rd. Overall	-
2020	4	NPL V3	0	0	0	0	0	0	0	0	TBD	TBD	TBD	Cancelled	Cancelled	Cancelled	-

Key:	Premiers / Champions	Runner-Up	Promoted ↑	Relegated ↓	Preliminary Cup Rounds

- Top scorers
  - 2015: (Australia) Zac Walker (15 goals)
  - 2016: (Australia) Zac Walker (10 goals)
  - 2017: (Australia) Zac Walker (12 goals)
  - 2018:
  - 2019:
- Managers
  - 2014: (England) Matt Gray (Resigned in late 2014)
  - 2015: (Australia) Mick Richards (Resigned in late 2015)
  - 2016: (England) James Coutts
  - 2017: (England) James Coutts
  - 2018:
  - 2019: Elliot Jones

== Home ground ==
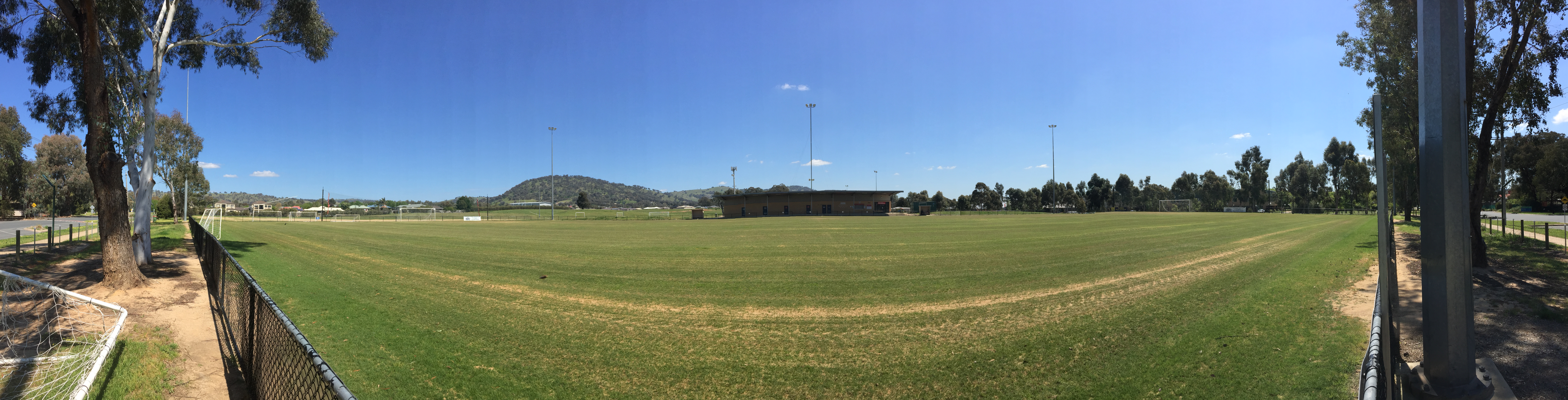
Panoramic photo of Murray United FC's home ground at La Trobe University

The club shares the La Trobe University football facilities with local side Wodonga Diamonds. The ground is located in Wodonga and will receive numerous upgrades leading into the inaugural season. Chairman Mark Byatt stated, "The focus will be on lighting, seating and minor works to players’ facilities and security".

The club has also played FFA Cup preliminary round matches at both the Savoy Sporting Club (Myrtleford) and the Lavington Sports Ground (Albury) in 2015 & 2016 respectively.
