= Coomera Colts S.C. =

Coomera Colts
- Full name: Coomera Football Club
- Nickname: Colts
- Founded: 1983; 43 years ago
- Ground: Viney Park
- Manager: Steven Morrison
- League: South Coast Premier League
- 2026: 6th of 12
Home colours	Away colours

Coomera Football Club is a Professional soccer club based in Coomera, Queensland, Australia. The club plays in the South Coast Premier League the first flight of the Football Queensland administrative division and the fifth flight of the Australian soccer league system.

Founded in 1983, the club plays their home games at Viney Park.

== Current squad ==
As of 4 July 2023

=== First-team squad ===
Note: Flags indicate national team as defined under FIFA eligibility rules; some limited exceptions apply. Players may hold more than one non-FIFA nationality.

No.	Pos.	Nation	Player
1	GK	ENG	Jamie Greygoose
2	DF	AUS	Jake Tipaldo
3	DF	BRA	Vinicius Alves
4	DF	AUS	Adam Baxter
5	DF	AUS	Blake Lockwood
6	MF	AUS	Jack Roach
7	MF	AUS	Jack Wales
8	MF	CAN	Joshua Tufino

No.	Pos.	Nation	Player
10	FW	AUS	Kaorushon Westell
9	FW	BRA	Alejandro Saicedo
11	FW	CAN	Mackenzie Roach
12	MF	AUS	Clayton McCoy
13	MF	AUS	Lewis Jones
14	GK	AUS	William Hardy
15	MF	AUS	Orrick Youll
16	MF	AUS	Raphael Binter
17	MF	AUS	Samuel Jones

=== Notable Players ===
The squad brought together a diverse group of players whose backgrounds and individual qualities added to its strength. With experience spanning North American college soccer and the English football system, alongside energetic midfield play and exciting attacking talent, the team featured several notable names.
- Among them was Mackenzie Roach, a Canadian-born winger with experience at the higher levels of North American college soccer. His background added to the squad’s international pedigree, bringing experience of a competitive collegiate environment to its attacking ranks.
- Joshua Tuffino, a Canadian midfielder, offered energy and tenacity in the centre of the pitch. His committed approach and ability to make his presence felt made him an influential figure in midfield, where his determination added a competitive edge to the team.
- Kaorushon Westell, an exciting winger whose combination of flair, blistering pace and attacking output made him a threat going forward. His speed added a direct dimension to the attack, while his creativity gave the side a dangerous avenue for breaking down opposition defences. His background spans competitive teams in both Australia and Japan.
- Experienced English goalkeeper Jamie Greygoose brought a background in the English football system. Particularly noted for his shot-stopping in one-on-one situations, Greygoose offered an important last line of defence, drawing on his experience when faced with opposition attackers bearing down on goal.

Note: Flags indicate national team as defined under FIFA eligibility rules; some limited exceptions apply. Players may hold more than one non-FIFA nationality.

No.	Pos.	Nation	Player
1	GK	AUS	Noah Kozic
2	MF	AUS	Luke Motram
3	FW	AUS	Henry Eve
4	FW	AUS	Brodie Adam

No.	Pos.	Nation	Player
5	MF	AUS	Jackson Ahrens
6	DF	AUS	Raul Cortez
7	DF	AUS	Afeworki Gebremariam
8	DF	AUS	Leo Farr
9	DF	AUS	Jack Baxter
10	DF	AUS	Patrick Manton
11	DF	AUS	Deklan Greig
12	DF	AUS	Quinn Wales

== Honours ==
=== Football Queensland South Coast ===
- FQPL 4 − South Coast / Men's Coast League 1 / First Division
  - Premiership
    - Winners (3): 1994, 1999, 2007
  - Championship
    - Winners (2): 1994, 2007
