= 2027 Football South Australia season =

Association football season in South Australia

Football South Australia
- Season: 2027

The 2027 Football South Australia season will be the 121st season of soccer in South Australia. It is the 22nd to be run by Football South Australia and the 15th under the National Premier Leagues banner.

== Changes from 2026 season ==
=== Pre-season team movements ===
| 2026 league | Promoted to league | Relegated from league |
|---|---|---|
| NPL SA | Adelaide Croatia Raiders; Modbury Jets | Adelaide Comets; Para Hills Knights |
| State League 1 | Pontian Eagles; Modbury Vista | Salisbury United; South Adelaide Panthers |
| State League 2 | | – |
| Women's NPL SA | | |
| Women's State League | – | – |

== 2027 National Premier Leagues South Australia ==
National Premier Leagues SA
- Season: 2027

The 2027 National Premier Leagues South Australia season, known as the RAA National Premier League for sponsorship reasons, is the 121st season of first division soccer in South Australia, and the 15th under the National Premier Leagues banner.

=== League table ===
| Pos | Team | Pld | W | D | L | GF | GA | GD | Pts | Qualification or relegation |
|---|---|---|---|---|---|---|---|---|---|---|
| 1 | Adelaide City | 0 | 0 | 0 | 0 | 0 | 0 | 0 | 0 | Qualification to Australian Championship and Finals series |
| 2 | Adelaide Croatia Raiders | 0 | 0 | 0 | 0 | 0 | 0 | 0 | 0 | Qualification to Finals series |
| 3 | Adelaide United Youth | 0 | 0 | 0 | 0 | 0 | 0 | 0 | 0 | Qualification to Finals series |
| 4 | Campbelltown City | 0 | 0 | 0 | 0 | 0 | 0 | 0 | 0 | Qualification to Finals series |
| 5 | Croydon FC | 0 | 0 | 0 | 0 | 0 | 0 | 0 | 0 | Qualification to Finals series |
| 6 | FK Beograd | 0 | 0 | 0 | 0 | 0 | 0 | 0 | 0 | Qualification to Finals series |
| 7 | Modbury Jets | 0 | 0 | 0 | 0 | 0 | 0 | 0 | 0 | |
| 8 | North Eastern MetroStars | 0 | 0 | 0 | 0 | 0 | 0 | 0 | 0 | |
| 9 | Playford City | 0 | 0 | 0 | 0 | 0 | 0 | 0 | 0 | |
| 10 | Sturt Lions | 0 | 0 | 0 | 0 | 0 | 0 | 0 | 0 | |
| 11 | West Adelaide | 0 | 0 | 0 | 0 | 0 | 0 | 0 | 0 | Relegation to SA State League 1 |
| 12 | West Torrens Birkalla | 0 | 0 | 0 | 0 | 0 | 0 | 0 | 0 | Relegation to SA State League 1 |

Source: Dribl
Rules for classification: 1) points; 2) goal difference; 3) number of goals scored; 4) head to head record; 5) playoff match.

=== Finals ===
Elimination Finals
4
5
3
6

Semi-finals

Grand Final

== 2027 State League 1 South Australia ==
SA State League 1
- Season: 2027
- Dates: 28 February–13 September

The 2027 State League 1 South Australia season will be the 104th season of second division soccer in South Australia.

=== League table ===
| Pos | Team | Pld | W | D | L | GF | GA | GD | Pts | Promotion, qualification or relegation |
|---|---|---|---|---|---|---|---|---|---|---|
| 1 | Adelaide Atletico VSC | 0 | 0 | 0 | 0 | 0 | 0 | 0 | 0 | Promotion to the 2027 NPL SA and qualification for Finals series |
| 2 | Adelaide Blue Eagles | 0 | 0 | 0 | 0 | 0 | 0 | 0 | 0 | Qualification for Finals series and promotion play-off |
| 3 | Adelaide Omonia Cobras | 0 | 0 | 0 | 0 | 0 | 0 | 0 | 0 | Qualification for Finals series and promotion play-off |
| 4 | Adelaide Comets | 0 | 0 | 0 | 0 | 0 | 0 | 0 | 0 | Qualification for Finals series and promotion play-off |
| 5 | Adelaide Olympic | 0 | 0 | 0 | 0 | 0 | 0 | 0 | 0 | Qualification for Finals series and promotion play-off |
| 6 | Cove FC | 0 | 0 | 0 | 0 | 0 | 0 | 0 | 0 | Qualification for Finals series and promotion play-off |
| 7 | Cumberland United | 0 | 0 | 0 | 0 | 0 | 0 | 0 | 0 | |
| 8 | Eastern United | 0 | 0 | 0 | 0 | 0 | 0 | 0 | 0 | |
| 9 | Fulham United | 0 | 0 | 0 | 0 | 0 | 0 | 0 | 0 | |
| 10 | Modbury Vista | 0 | 0 | 0 | 0 | 0 | 0 | 0 | 0 | |
| 11 | Para Hills Knights | 0 | 0 | 0 | 0 | 0 | 0 | 0 | 0 | Relegation to SA State League 2 |
| 12 | Pontian Eagles | 0 | 0 | 0 | 0 | 0 | 0 | 0 | 0 | Relegation to SA State League 2 |

Source: Dribl
Rules for classification: 1) points; 2) goal difference; 3) number of goals scored; 4) head to head record; 5) playoff match.

=== Finals ===
Elimination Finals
4
5
3
6

Semi-finals

Grand Final

== 2027 State League 2 South Australia ==
SA State League 2
- Season: 2026
- Dates: 13 March–13 September

The 2027 State League 2 South Australia season will be the 60th season of third division soccer in South Australia.

Possible Teams in the competition will be determined after attestation in early 2027.

- Adelaide Hills Hawks
- Adelaide Titans
- Adelaide University
- Angle Vale
- Barossa United
- Elizabeth Downs
- Elizabeth Grove
- Gawler Eagles
- Ghan United
- Mount Barker United
- Noarlunga United
- Northern Demons
- Plympton Bulldogs
- Port Adelaide
- Salisbury Inter
- Salisbury United
- Seaford Rangers
- South Adelaide Panthers
- Vipers FC
- Western Strikers

== 2027 Federation Cup ==
2027 FSA Federation Cup
