= 2022 Football South Australia season =

Association football season in South Australia

Football South Australia
- Season: 2022
- Dates: 18 February–23 September

The 2022 Football South Australia season was the 116th season of soccer in South Australia. It was the 17th to be run by Football South Australia and the 10th under the National Premier Leagues banner.

== Changes from 2021 ==
=== Promotion and relegation ===
2021 League	Promoted to league	Relegated from league
National Premier Leagues SA	FK Beograd; West Torrens Birkalla	Adelaide Blue Eagles; Adelaide Croatia Raiders
SA State League 1	Adelaide Cobras; Vipers FC	University of Adelaide; Adelaide Hills Hawks
SA State League 2	–	–
Women's National Premier Leagues SA	Modbury Vista; West Torrens Birkalla	–
SA Women's State League	Adelaide Hills Hawks; Campbelltown City; Elizabeth Grove	FK Beograd

- Women's National Premier Leagues South Australia expanded from eight teams to 10 teams. As a result, there was no relegation.

=== Name changes ===
- White City Woodville FC became FK Beograd.
- Flinders Flames WFC merged with Cumberland United WFC to form Flinders United WFC.

== Men's Competitions ==
=== 2022 National Premier Leagues South Australia ===
NPL South Australia
- Season: 2022
- Dates: 18 February–9 September
- Champions: Adelaide City (19th title)
- Premiers: Adelaide City (3rd title)
- Relegated: Cumberland United; West Torrens Birkalla
- Matches: 132
- Goals: 449 (3.4 per match)
- Top goalscorer: Joshua Mori (18 goals)
- Biggest home win: Adelaide United Youth 8–0 South Adelaide Panthers (4 June 2022)
- Biggest away win: Cumberland United 0–7 South Adelaide Panthers (30 July 2022)
- Highest scoring: Adelaide United Youth 8–0 South Adelaide Panthers (4 June 2022)

The 2022 National Premier Leagues South Australia season, known as the 2022 RAA National Premier League for sponsorship reasons, was the 116th season of first division soccer in South Australia, and the 10th under the National Premier Leagues banner.

Adelaide City were champions for the 19th time, defeating Adelaide Comets 2–1 in the Grand Final. Adelaide City were also premiers for the third time. Cumberland United and West Torrens Birkalla were relegated.

==== League Table ====
Pos	Team	Pld	W	D	L	GF	GA	GD	Pts	Qualification or relegation
1	Adelaide City (C)	22	15	6	1	55	17	+38	51	Qualification for Finals
2	Campbelltown City	22	16	2	4	44	27	+17	50	Qualification for Finals
3	Adelaide Comets	22	14	3	5	47	21	+26	45	Qualification for Finals
4	North Eastern MetroStars	22	13	2	7	38	25	+13	41	Qualification for Finals
5	Adelaide United Youth	22	10	2	10	55	55	0	32	Qualification for Finals
6	Croydon FC	22	9	3	10	28	27	+1	30	Qualification for Finals
7	FK Beograd	22	8	5	9	35	39	−4	29	
8	Sturt Lions	22	7	4	11	29	44	−15	25	
9	South Adelaide Panthers	22	6	4	12	38	49	−11	22	
10	Adelaide Olympic	22	5	5	12	32	45	−13	20	
11	Cumberland United (R)	22	5	2	15	24	53	−29	17	Relegation to SA State League 1
12	West Torrens Birkalla (R)	22	3	4	15	24	47	−23	13	Relegation to SA State League 1

Source: mygameday
Rules for classification: 1) points; 2) goal difference; 3) number of goals scored.
(C) Champions; (R) Relegated

==== Results ====
Home \ Away	ACI	COM	OLY	ADL	CAM	CDN	CMB	FKB	MET	SAP	STL	WTB
Adelaide City	—	1–1	6–0	3–3	3–1	1–0	5–1	4–2	0–1	1–1	3–0	1–1
Adelaide Comets	0–3	—	1–0	7–0	1–2	2–0	2–1	2–1	1–0	2–0	2–0	4–1
Adelaide Olympic	0–2	0–2	—	3–1	1–2	1–0	2–3	4–2	2–3	4–0	3–4	2–2
Adelaide United Youth	2–4	4–2	3–1	—	1–2	3–4	2–1	5–2	2–3	8–0	1–3	4–1
Campbelltown City	0–2	3–2	3–0	5–2	—	2–1	4–2	2–1	2–3	2–0	1–1	3–0
Croydon FC	0–0	1–0	0–1	2–3	1–2	—	3–0	1–2	0–4	1–1	2–1	0–0
Cumberland United	1–3	1–1	3–2	0–4	1–2	1–2	—	0–3	0–2	0–7	1–3	2–0
FK Beograd	1–1	1–2	1–1	1–2	2–2	1–0	2–0	—	3–2	0–3	1–1	3–2
North Eastern MetroStars	0–3	1–1	2–0	2–3	2–0	1–2	1–1	1–2	—	2–1	3–1	3–0
South Adelaide Panthers	1–3	0–3	3–3	6–0	0–1	1–3	2–4	1–1	1–0	—	2–3	2–5
Sturt Lions	1–4	1–4	2–2	1–1	0–1	0–4	1–0	1–0	0–1	1–3	—	4–2
West Torrens Birkalla	0–2	0–5	0–0	2–1	1–2	0–1	0–1	2–3	0–1	2–3	3–0	—

Source: mygameday
Legend: Blue = home team win; Yellow = draw; Red = away team win.

==== Top Scorers ====
Rank	Player	Club	Goals
1	Joshua Mori	FK Beograd	18
2	Jonathon Rideout	South Adelaide Panthers	14
3	Aladin Irabona	Adelaide City	13
3	Alexander Mullen	Campbelltown City	13
5	Luka Jovanovic	Adelaide United Youth	12
5	Marc Marino	Campbelltown City	12
7	Kur Kur	Adelaide City	11
7	Thomas Briscoe	Adelaide Comets	11
9	Asad Kasumovic	Adelaide United Youth	10
10	3 players		8

==== Finals ====
Elimination finals
3	Adelaide Comets	1
6	Croydon FC	0
4	North Eastern MetroStars	2
5	Adelaide United Youth	1

Semifinals
1	Adelaide City	0	3
2	Campbelltown City	0	2
3	Adelaide Comets (p)	0 (6)
4	North Eastern MetroStars	0 (5)

Preliminary final
2	Campbelltown City	0
3	Adelaide Comets	1

Grand final
1	Adelaide City	2
3	Adelaide Comets	1

=== 2022 State League 1 South Australia ===
State League 1 South Australia
- Season: 2022
- Dates: 19 February–10 September
- Champions: West Adelaide
- Premiers: Modbury Jets
- Promoted: Modbury Jets; West Adelaide
- Relegated: Adelaide Hills Hawks; University of Adelaide
- Matches: 132
- Goals: 433 (3.28 per match)
- Top goalscorer: Hamish McCabe (20 Goals)
- Biggest home win: Adelaide Croatia Raiders 6–0 Playford City Patriots (30 April 2022)
- Biggest away win: Port Adelaide Pirates 1–10 Modbury Jets (25 July 2022)
- Highest scoring: Port Adelaide Pirates 1–10 Modbury Jets (25 July 2022)

The 2022 State League 1 South Australia season was the 99th season of second division soccer in South Australia, and the 10th under the National Premier Leagues banner.

West Adelaide were champions for the third time, defeating Para Hills Knights 4–3 in the Grand Final, and were promoted with Modbury Jets, who were premiers for the fourth time. University of Adelaide and Adelaide Hills Hawks were relegated.

==== League Table ====
Pos	Team	Pld	W	D	L	GF	GA	GD	Pts	Promotion, qualification or relegation
1	Modbury Jets (P)	22	15	3	4	75	30	+45	48	Promotion to National Premier Leagues SA and qualification for Finals
2	West Adelaide (C, P)	22	11	9	2	47	28	+19	42	Qualification for Finals (Note: The winner of the Finals are crowned the champions and are promoted, unless they have already earned promotion, in which case the runner-up is promoted.)
3	Adelaide Blue Eagles	22	12	4	6	48	29	+19	40	Qualification for Finals
4	Para Hills Knights	22	12	4	6	35	28	+7	40	Qualification for Finals
5	Adelaide Croatia Raiders	22	11	4	7	45	34	+11	37	Qualification for Finals
6	Fulham United	22	9	6	7	30	28	+2	33	Qualification for Finals
7	Playford City Patriots	22	9	3	10	31	43	−12	30	
8	Port Adelaide Pirates	22	9	1	12	31	51	−20	28	
9	Eastern United	22	7	4	11	29	38	−9	25	
10	Adelaide Victory	22	5	9	8	21	23	−2	24	
11	University of Adelaide (R)	22	3	4	15	21	50	−29	13	Relegation to SA State League 2
12	Adelaide Hills Hawks (R)	22	2	3	17	20	51	−31	9	Relegation to SA State League 2

Source: mygameday
Rules for classification: 1) points; 2) goal difference; 3) number of goals scored.
(C) Champions; (P) Promoted; (R) Relegated

==== Finals ====
Elimination finals
4	Para Hills Knights	3
5	Adelaide Croatia Raiders	0
3	Adelaide Blue Eagles	0
6	Fulham United	1

Semifinals
2	West Adelaide	3	1
1	Modbury Jets	0	1
4	Para Hills Knights (a.e.t.)	1
6	Fulham United	0

Preliminary final
1	Modbury Jets	2
4	Para Hills Knights	3

Grand final
2	West Adelaide	4
4	Para Hills Knights	3

=== 2022 State League 2 South Australia ===
State League 2 South Australia
- Season: 2022
- Dates: 19 February–10 September
- Champions: Vipers FC
- Premiers: Adelaide Cobras
- Promoted: Adelaide Cobras; Vipers FC
- Matches: 132
- Goals: 476 (3.61 per match)
- Top goalscorer: Anthony Dimas (30 goals)
- Biggest home win: Salisbury United 7–0 Gawler Eagles (21 May 2022)
- Biggest away win: Gawler Eagles 1–6 Pontian Eagles (2 April 2022)
- Highest scoring: Salisbury United 6–3 Pontian Eagles (12 March 2022); Modbury Vista 3–6 Adelaide Cobras (13 August 2022)

The 2022 State League 2 South Australia season is the 55th season of third division soccer in South Australia, and the seventh under the National Premier Leagues banner.

Vipers FC were champions for the first time, defeating Western Strikers 4–3 after extra time in the Grand Final, and were promoted with Adelaide Cobras, who were premiers for the second time.

==== League Table ====
Pos	Team	Pld	W	D	L	GF	GA	GD	Pts	Promotion or qualification
1	Adelaide Cobras (P)	22	15	5	2	45	24	+21	50	Promotion to SA State League 1 and qualification for Finals
2	Vipers FC (C, P)	22	11	9	2	44	26	+18	42	Qualification for Finals (Note: The winner of the Finals are crowned the champions and are promoted, unless they have already earned promotion, in which case the runner-up is promoted.)
3	Western Strikers	22	11	6	5	41	33	+8	39	Qualification for Finals
4	The Cove	22	9	8	5	38	29	+9	35	Qualification for Finals
5	Seaford Rangers	22	10	5	7	42	34	+8	35	Qualification for Finals
6	Northern Demons	22	11	2	9	38	34	+4	35	Qualification for Finals
7	Salisbury United	22	9	7	6	49	39	+10	34	
8	Modbury Vista	22	7	3	12	43	50	−7	24	
9	Pontian Eagles	22	6	5	11	44	54	−10	23	
10	Noarlunga United	22	5	5	12	36	38	−2	20	
11	Mount Barker United	22	4	5	13	29	49	−20	17	
12	Gawler Eagles	22	2	4	16	27	66	−39	10	

Source: mygameday
Rules for classification: 1) points; 2) goal difference; 3) number of goals scored.
(C) Champions; (P) Promoted

==== Finals ====
Elimination finals
3	Western Strikers (p)	2 (3)
6	Northern Demons	2 (2)
4	The Cove	2
5	Seaford Rangers	0

Semifinals
2	Vipers FC	3	3
1	Adelaide Cobras	1	0
3	Western Strikers	3
4	The Cove	1

Preliminary final
1	Adelaide Cobras	1
3	Western Strikers	2

Grand final
2	Vipers FC (a.e.t.)	4
3	Western Strikers	3

== Women's Competitions ==
=== 2022 Women's National Premier Leagues South Australia ===
WNPL South Australia
- Season: 2022
- Champions: West Adelaide
- Premiers: West Adelaide

The 2022 Women's National Premier Leagues South Australia was the seventh season of soccer under the competition format in South Australia. It is the first tier of women's football in South Australia and the second tier of women's football in Australia. Each team plays each other twice, resulting in 18 rounds.

==== League Table ====
Pos	Team	Pld	W	D	L	GF	GA	GD	Pts	Qualification or relegation
1	West Adelaide (C)	18	16	1	1	81	18	+63	49	2022 SA WNPL Finals
2	Adelaide City	18	14	0	4	49	27	+22	42	2022 SA WNPL Finals
3	Salisbury Inter	18	11	2	5	48	24	+24	35	2022 SA WNPL Finals
4	Adelaide Comets	18	10	2	6	44	37	+7	32	2022 SA WNPL Finals
5	FFSA NTC	18	9	3	6	55	31	+24	30	2022 SA WNPL Finals
6	Metro United	18	9	1	8	29	39	−10	28	
7	University of Adelaide	18	6	3	9	22	37	−15	21	
8	West Torrens Birkalla	18	1	4	13	14	50	−36	7	
9	Fulham United	18	1	4	13	13	53	−40	7	Qualified for Relegation play-off
10	Modbury Vista (R)	18	0	6	12	26	65	−39	6	Relegated to 2023 SA Women's State League

Source: sportstg.com
Rules for classification: 1) points; 2) goal difference; 3) number of goals scored.
(C) Champions; (R) Relegated

==== Finals ====
Qualifying Final
2	Adelaide City (a.e.t.)	1
3	Salisbury Inter	0
4	Adelaide Comets	3
5	FFSA NTC	1

Major Semi-Final
1	West Adelaide	3
2	Adelaide City	0
Minor Semi-Final
3	Salisbury Inter	2
4	Adelaide Comets	1

Preliminary final
2	Adelaide City	6
3	Salisbury Inter	2

Grand Final
1	West Adelaide	1
2	Adelaide City	0

=== 2022 Women's State League South Australia ===
WSL South Australia
- Season: 2022
- Champions: Flinders United

The 2022 Women's State League South Australia was the second season of soccer under the competition format in South Australia. It is the second tier of women's football in South Australia and the third tier of women's football in Australia. Each team plays each other three times, resulting in 14 rounds.

==== League Table ====
Pos	Team	Pld	W	D	L	GF	GA	GD	Pts	Qualification or relegation
1	Flinders United (C, P)	14	13	0	1	63	8	+55	39	Promoted to 2023 Women's National Premier Leagues SA
2	South Adelaide Panthers	14	11	1	2	55	17	+38	34	Qualified for Promotion play-off
3	Modbury Jets	14	7	1	6	32	24	+8	22	
4	The Cove	14	7	1	6	40	34	+6	22	
5	Adelaide Hills Hawks	14	7	1	6	30	25	+5	22	
6	Adelaide Jaguars	14	7	0	7	39	23	+16	21	
7	Elizabeth Grove	14	1	1	12	14	73	−59	4	
8	Campbelltown City	14	0	1	13	8	77	−69	1	

Source: mygameday
Rules for classification: 1) points; 2) goal difference; 3) number of goals scored.
(C) Champions; (P) Promoted

== Cup Competitions ==
=== 2022 Federation Cup ===
2022 Federation Cup
Tournament details
- Dates: 18 March–16 July
- Teams: 51

Final positions
- Champions: Adelaide City
- Runners-up: Modbury Jets

The 2022 Football South Australia Federation Cup was the 109th running of the Federation Cup, the main soccer knockout competition in South Australia. The competition ran alongside the 2022 Australia Cup, with the two finalists qualifying for the competition. Teams from the National Premier Leagues South Australia, State League 1 South Australia, State League 2 South Australia. South Australian Collegiate Soccer League and South Australian Amateur Soccer League participated.

Adelaide City were champions.

==== Bracket ====
First round Third preliminary round
Adelaide University (a.e.t.)	3
Adelaide Cobras	2
Playford City Patriots	4
Western Strikers	2
Mount Barker United	2
Adelaide Titans	1
Adelaide Croatia Raiders	1
Vipers FC	2
Adelaide Thunder	0
West Adelaide	6
Adelaide Victory	1
Fulham United	0
Adelaide Blue Eagles	4
Northern Demons	2
Modbury Jets	6
Seaford Rangers	0
Pontian Eagles	6
Old Ignatians	4
Pembroke Old Scholars	1
The Cove	6
Eastern United	7
Adelaide Uni Grads Red	0
Elizabeth Downs	4
Brahma Lodge	0
Ghan Kilburn City (a.e.t.)	5
Para Hills West	3
BOSA FC	0
Noarlunga United	5
Modbury Vista	7
Rostrevor Old Collegians	1
Gawler Eagles	8
Elizabeth Grove	1
Para Hills Knights	3 (4)
Salisbury United (p)	3 (5)
Parafield Gardens	7
Adelaide Uni Grads Blue	0
Adelaide Red Blue Eagles	0
Adelaide Hills Hawks	3

Second round Fourth preliminary round
Adelaide University	1
Playford City Patirots	3
Sturt Lions	2
North Eastern MetroStars	3
Port Adelaide Pirates	4
Mount Barker United	2
Vipers FC	2
Cumberland United	1
West Adelaide	3
Adelaide Victory	0
Croydon Kings	3
Adelaide Blue Eagles	1
Tea Tree Gully City	2
Modbury Jets	5
South Adelaide Panthers	2
Pontian Eagles	0
Campbelltown City	3
The Cove	0
Adelaide Comets	1
Adelaide Olympic	3
Eastern United	5
Elizabeth Downs	3
Ghan Kilburn City	0 (2)
Noarlunga United (p)	0 (4)
Adelaide City	6
Modbury Vista	0
West Torrens Birkalla	1
FK Beograd	0
Gawler Eagles	0
Salisbury United (a.e.t.)	2
Parafield Gardens	6
Adelaide Hills Hawks	1

Third round Fifth preliminary round
Playford City Patriots	1
North Eastern MetroStars	0
Port Adelaide Pirates	0
Vipers FC	1
West Adelaide	1
Croydon Kings	0
Modbury Jets	4
South Adelaide Panthers	3
Campbelltown City	4
Adelaide Olympic	3
Eastern United	3
Noarlunga United	1
Adelaide City	5
West Torrens Birkalla	0
Salisbury United	3
Parafield Gardens	2

Quarter-finals; Sixth preliminary round
Playford City Patriots	0
Vipers FC	1
West Adelaide	0
Modbury Jets	2
Campbelltown City	1
Eastern United	2
Adelaide City	4
Salisbury United	1

Semi-finals; Seventh preliminary round
Vipers FC	1
Modbury Jets	4
Eastern United	0
Adelaide City	5

Final
16 July – Gepps Cross
Modbury Jets	0
Adelaide City	5

=== 2022 WNPL and WSL Cup ===
2022 WNPL and WSL Cup
Tournament details
- Dates: 22 April–14 August
- Teams: 29

Final positions
- Champions: West Adelaide
- Runners-up: Adelaide City

The 2022 WNPL and WSL Cup was the main women's soccer knockout competition in South Australia for 2022.

West Adelaide were champions.

==== Bracket ====
Preliminary Round
Salisbury Inter Reserves	1 (4)
The Cove	1 (5)
West Adelaide	5
Modbury Vista	1
Elizabeth Grove	1
Salisbury Inter	19
Adelaide Jaguars	0
University of Adelaide	4
Campbelltown City	6
FK Beograd	1
Modbury Vista Reserves	0
Metro United	7
Adelaide Comets Reserves	2
Adelaide Hills Hawks	1
Adelaide Comets	7
Metro United	1
FSA NTC	1
Adelaide City	6
Adelaide University Reserves	6
West Adelaide Reserves	1
Adelaide City Reserves	1
West Torrens Birkalla Reserves	2
West Torrens Birkalla	3
Fulham United Reserves	0
South Adelaide Panthers	0
Flinders United	4

Round of 16
The Cove	0
'West Adelaide	11
Salisbury Inter	5
Fulham United	1
Modbury Jets	4
FSA NTC Reserves	5
University of Adelaide	6
Campbelltown City	0
Metro United	5
Adelaide Comets Reserves	0
Adelaide Comets	1
Adelaide City	3
Adelaide University Reserves (a.e.t.)	6
West Torrens Birkalla Reserves	4
West Torrens Birkalla	1
Flinders United	0

Quarter final
West Adelaide	1
Salisbury Inter	0
FSA NTC Reserves (a.e.t.)	4
University of Adelaide	3
Metro United	1
Adelaide City	4
Adelaide University Reserves	0
West Torrens Birkalla	6

Semi final
West Adelaide	12
FSA NTC Reserves	0
Adelaide City	2
West Torrens Birkalla	0

Grand final
West Adelaide	3
Adelaide City	1

==== 2022 WNPL and WSL Cup Final ====
14 August 2022
15:00 ACST

West Adelaide	3–1	Adelaide City
Mullan 41', 70'; Quigley 90'	Report	Bowler 11'

ServiceFM Stadium, Gepps Cross, Adelaide
Referee: Curtis Wordsworth

== Awards ==
The end of year awards were presented at Adelaide Convention Centre on 8 October 2022.

=== National Premier Leagues SA ===
Award	Men's	Women's
Player of the Year (Note: Men's: Sergio Melta Award Women's: Shirley Brown Medal)	Alex Mullen (Campbelltown City)	Racheal Quigley (West Adelaide)
Golden Boot	Joshua Mori (FK Beograd)	Racheal Quigley (West Adelaide)
Coach of the Year (Note: Men's: Martyn Crook Trophy Women's: Bob Bush Trophy)	Paul Pezos (Adelaide City)	Michele Lastella (Football SA NTC)
Goalkeeper of the Year (Note: Men's: Peter Nikolich Trophy)	Dakota Ochsenham (Adelaide City)	Annalee Grove (West Adelaide)
Rising Star (Note: Men's: John Aloisi Rising Star)	Luka Jovanovic (Adelaide United)	Grace Wilson (Football SA NTC)
