= 2024 Football South Australia season =

Association football season in South Australia

Football South Australia
- Season: 2024
- Dates: 16 February–13 September

The 2024 Football South Australia season was the 118th season of soccer in South Australia. It was the 19th to be run by Football South Australia and the 12th under the National Premier Leagues banner.

== Changes from 2023 ==
2023 League	Promoted to league	Relegated from league
National Premier Leagues SA	Adelaide Croatia Raiders; Para Hills Knights	Sturt Lions; West Adelaide
SA State League 1	Salisbury United; Western Strikers	Eastern United; Port Adelaide Pirates
SA State League 2	–	–
Women's National Premier Leagues SA	Sturt Lions	Fulham United
SA Women's State League	Western Strikers	Adelaide Hills Hawks

== Men's competitions ==
=== 2024 National Premier Leagues South Australia ===
National Premier Leagues SA
- Season: 2024
- Dates: 23 February–6 September
- Champions: Campbelltown City (7th title)
- Premiers: North Eastern MetroStars (11th title)
- Relegated: Adelaide Olympic; South Adelaide Panthers
- Matches: 132
- Goals: 486 (3.68 per match)
- Statistics do not include finals matches.

The 2024 National Premier Leagues South Australia season, known as the 2024 RAA National Premier League for sponsorship reasons, was the 118th season of first division soccer in South Australia, and the 12th under the National Premier Leagues banner.

Campbelltown City were champions for the seventh time, defeating North Eastern MetroStars 3–1 in the Grand Final. North Eastern MetroStars were premiers for the 11th time. Adelaide Olympic and South Adelaide Panthers were relegated.

==== League table ====
Pos	Team	Pld	W	D	L	GF	GA	GD	Pts	Qualification or relegation
1	North Eastern MetroStars	22	12	7	3	51	28	+23	43	Qualification for Finals
2	Campbelltown City (C)	22	11	8	3	45	30	+15	41	Qualification for Finals
3	Modbury Jets	22	11	5	6	51	34	+17	38	Qualification for Finals
4	Adelaide City	22	11	2	9	39	29	+10	35	Qualification for Finals
5	Adelaide Comets	22	8	8	6	43	30	+13	32	Qualification for Finals
6	Adelaide United Youth	22	9	5	8	51	57	−6	32	Qualification for Finals
7	FK Beograd	22	8	5	9	39	38	+1	29	
8	Croydon FC	22	8	5	9	38	48	−10	29	
9	Adelaide Croatia Raiders	22	7	4	11	38	41	−3	25	
10	Para Hills Knights	22	6	7	9	33	40	−7	25	
11	Adelaide Olympic (R)	22	7	3	12	28	48	−20	24	Relegation to SA State League 1
12	South Adelaide Panthers (R)	22	2	5	15	30	63	−33	11	Relegation to SA State League 1

Source: Dribl
Rules for classification: 1) points; 2) goal difference; 3) number of goals scored; 4) head to head record; 5) playoff match.
(C) Champions; (R) Relegated

==== Results ====
Home \ Away	ACI	COM	ACR	OLY	ADL	CAM	CDN	FKB	MOD	MET	PHK	SAP
Adelaide City		2–1	2–1	2–0	2–3	1–3	4–0	0–1	0–2	2–2	1–0	4–0
Adelaide Comets	1–0		2–3	2–0	4–2	3–3	0–0	1–1	1–1	0–3	3–1	6–1
Adelaide Croatia Raiders	2–0	2–2		0–1	1–2	0–1	4–1	3–2	2–3	0–0	2–2	1–3
Adelaide Olympic	1–6	0–2	2–1		2–3	0–2	4–1	1–5	1–4	4–3	2–1	1–0
Adelaide United Youth	4–0	1–1	0–2	2–2		0–5	3–4	4–1	1–5	0–4	4–4	2–1
Campbelltown City	2–2	0–4	2–0	3–2	2–4		1–1	4–2	3–0	2–0	2–2	1–1
Croydon FC	1–0	2–1	2–1	2–2	2–4	1–0		2–3	0–4	2–3	2–1	5–3
FK Beograd	0–1	1–0	3–1	4–0	2–2	2–2	1–1		3–1	0–3	0–3	2–3
Modbury Jets	2–0	3–0	3–4	3–1	4–4	0–1	3–2	2–1		1–1	2–3	3–3
North Eastern MetroStars	0–4	2–2	4–3	1–0	5–1	3–3	4–1	2–1	1–1		0–0	2–0
Para Hills Knights	2–3	2–2	1–1	0–0	2–1	0–1	0–4	1–3	2–0	0–5		3–0
South Adelaide Panthers	1–3	0–5	3–4	1–2	2–4	2–2	2–2	1–1	0–4	1–3	2–3	

Source: Dribl
Legend: Blue = home team win; Yellow = draw; Red = away team win.

==== Finals ====
Elimination Finals
4	Adelaide City	2
5	Adelaide Comets	1
3	Modbury Jets (a.e.t.)	3
6	Adelaide United Youth	2

Semi-finals
4	Adelaide City	0	0	0
1	North Eastern MetroStars	0	2	2
3	Modbury Jets	0	0	0
2	Campbelltown City	2	3	5

Grand Final
1	North Eastern MetroStars	1
2	Campbelltown City	3

=== 2024 State League 1 South Australia ===
SA State League 1
- Season: 2024
- Dates: 24 February–7 September
- Champions: Playford City (5th title)
- Premiers: West Torrens Birkalla (5th title)
- Promoted: Playford City; West Torrens Birkalla
- Relegated: Adelaide Victory; Western Strikers
- Matches: 132
- Goals: 449 (3.4 per match)

The 2024 State League 1 South Australia season was the 101st season of second division soccer in South Australia.

Playford City were champions for the fifth time, defeating West Torrens Birkalla 2–1 in the Grand Final. West Torrens Birkalla were premiers for the fifth time, and were promoted with Playford City. Adelaide Victory and Western Strikers were relegated.

==== League table ====
Pos	Team	Pld	W	D	L	GF	GA	GD	Pts	Promotion, qualification or relegation
1	West Torrens Birkalla (P)	22	15	1	6	50	27	+23	46	Promotion to National Premier Leagues SA and qualification for Finals
2	Playford City (C, P)	22	13	5	4	55	27	+28	44	Qualification for Finals
3	Adelaide Blue Eagles	22	12	3	7	56	35	+21	39	Qualification for Finals
4	Cumberland United	22	10	7	5	36	30	+6	37	Qualification for Finals
5	Salisbury United	22	10	3	9	44	36	+8	33	Qualification for Finals
6	West Adelaide	22	10	3	9	34	34	0	33	Qualification for Finals
7	Adelaide Cobras	22	10	2	10	35	36	−1	32	
8	Sturt Lions	22	10	2	10	33	42	−9	32	
9	Fulham United	22	8	3	11	25	31	−6	27	
10	Vipers FC	22	8	2	12	34	48	−14	26	
11	Western Strikers (R)	22	4	3	15	26	52	−26	15	Relegation to SA State League 2
12	Adelaide Victory (R)	22	4	2	16	21	51	−30	14	Relegation to SA State League 2

Source: Dribl
Rules for classification: 1) points; 2) goal difference; 3) number of goals scored; 4) head to head record; 5) playoff match.
(C) Champions; (P) Promoted; (R) Relegated

==== Results ====
Home \ Away	ABE	AOC	VIC	CMB	FUL	PLY	SLB	STL	VIP	WES	STR	WTB
Adelaide Blue Eagles			3–1	1–3	4–0	4–1		1–4	3–0	4–1	3–1	3–0
Adelaide Cobras	2–3		4–2		2–0	1–2	3–2		3–2	0–1	2–1	1–2
Adelaide Victory	2–1				2–3	1–2	2–4	2–0	0–1	1–2	1–0	3–2
Cumberland United		1–1	2–0		1–1	1–4	2–0	2–2	1–0	4–0		3–0
Fulham United	3–2	3–0	3–0	0–1		0–3	0–2	3–0		1–0	3–2	
Playford City	0–0	0–2	1–0	2–0	0–0			4–1	2–4		4–0	2–1
Salisbury United	3–2	0–1	3–0	3–1		2–2			4–1	1–1	2–1	1–0
Sturt Lions	0–3	3–2	3–1	1–0	0–1	1–1	2–1		4–2	1–0		
Vipers FC	2–0	1–1		2–2	2–1	1–6	3–2	1–3			0–1	4–2
West Adelaide	1–1	3–0		1–2		1–5	1–2	2–1	3–2		2–1	0–5
Western Strikers		2–3	0–0	2–2	1–1		2–1	2–0	2–1	0–2		1–2
West Torrens Birkalla	3–2	3–0	3–1	4–0	1–0		2–1	2–0		1–1	2–1	

Updated to match(es) played on 15 June 2024. Source: Dribl
Legend: Blue = home team win; Yellow = draw; Red = away team win.

==== Finals ====
Elimination Finals
4	Cumberland United	2
5	Salisbury United	3
3	Adelaide Blue Eagles	4
6	West Adelaide	2

Semi-finals
5	Salisbury United	1	2	3
1	West Torrens Birkalla	3	1	4
3	Adelaide Blue Eagles	1	1	2
2	Playford City	0	3	3

Grand Final
1	West Torrens Birkalla	1
2	Playford City	2

=== 2024 State League 2 South Australia ===
SA State League 2
- Season: 2024
- Dates: 24 February–7 September
- Matches: 89
- Goals: 342 (3.84 per match)
- Biggest home win: Pontian 9–1 Mt Barker (11 May)
- Biggest away win: Eastern 0–5 Noarlunga (5 April)
- Highest scoring: Pontian 9–1 Mt Barker (11 May)

The 2024 State League 2 South Australia season was the 57th season of third division soccer in South Australia. The season ran from 24 February to 7 September, as a double round-robin over 22 rounds, followed by a finals series.

==== League table ====
Pos	Team	Pld	W	D	L	GF	GA	GD	Pts	Promotion or qualification
1	Pontian Eagles (P)	22	18	1	3	69	27	+42	55	Promotion to SA State League 1 and qualification for Finals
2	The Cove (C, P)	22	17	1	4	56	19	+37	52	Qualification for Finals
3	Adelaide University	22	16	2	4	43	19	+24	50	Qualification for Finals
4	Modbury Vista	22	13	2	7	57	43	+14	41	Qualification for Finals
5	Northern Demons	22	12	2	8	54	32	+22	38	Qualification for Finals
6	Eastern United	22	9	3	10	38	43	−5	30	Qualification for Finals
7	Noarlunga United	22	9	2	11	44	41	+3	29	
8	Seaford Rangers	22	7	4	11	27	39	−12	25	
9	Port Adelaide Pirates	22	8	1	13	34	52	−18	25	
10	Mount Barker United	22	6	1	15	30	62	−32	19	
11	Adelaide Hills Hawks	22	4	0	18	21	64	−43	12	
12	Gawler Eagles	22	3	1	18	29	61	−32	10	

Source: Dribl
Rules for classification: 1) points; 2) goal difference; 3) number of goals scored; 4) head to head record; 5) playoff match.
(C) Champions; (P) Promoted

==== Results ====
Home \ Away	ADH	UNI	ESU	GAW	MVI	MBU	NOA	NDE	PON	PAP	SEA	COV
Adelaide Hills Hawks		0–3	2–3	0–3	1–5	1–0		2–4		3–1	0–2	
Adelaide University			1–0	3–0	1–2	4–0	2–1			2–0	3–0	2–1
Eastern United	4–1			4–2	2–2		0–5		1–2	3–1		0–1
Gawler Eagles					3–5		1–2	2–4	5–2	1–3	1–1	0–1
Modbury Vista	5–1	0–3				3–2	4–2	1–0	2–4	6–2		0–4
Mount Barker United	3–1	2–3	4–1	3–2			0–2			0–3		1–3
Noarlunga United	3–0	2–0				1–3		0–3	2–3		0–1	2–3
Northern Demons	4–0	0–2	1–2	6–1		5–1			2–2	3–0		
Pontian Eagles	3–2	1–2	4–0	3–0		9–1		4–0			3–1	
Port Adelaide Pirates			4–1	3–2	2–2		0–2	2–1	1–4		1–0	3–1
Seaford Rangers		0–0	0–1	4–0	0–3	1–1	2–2	0–1	1–5			
The Cove	5–1				3–0	3–0	4–0	4–3	0–3		1–2	

Updated to match(es) played on 15 June 2024. Source: Dribl
Legend: Blue = home team win; Yellow = draw; Red = away team win.

== Women's competitions ==
=== 2024 Women's National Premier Leagues South Australia ===
Women's National Premier Leagues SA
- Season: 2024
- Dates: 15 March–13 September
- Matches: 35
- Goals: 119 (3.4 per match)
- Biggest home win: Adelaide Comets 6–2 Salisbury Inter (23 March)
- Biggest away win: Flinders United 0–5 West Adelaide (15 March)
- Highest scoring: Adelaide Comets 6–2 Salisbury Inter (23 March)

The 2024 Women's National Premier Leagues South Australia season, known as the 2024 Go Sunny Solar Women's National Premier League for sponsorship reasons, was the first division of women's soccer in South Australia for 2024, and the ninth under the Women's National Premier Leagues banner. The season ran from 15 March to 13 September, as a double round-robin over 18 rounds, followed by a finals series.

==== League table ====
Pos	Team	Pld	W	D	L	GF	GA	GD	Pts	Qualification or relegation
1	West Adelaide	7	5	1	1	22	6	+16	16	Qualification for Finals
2	Adelaide Comets	7	5	1	1	21	8	+13	16	Qualification for Finals
3	West Torrens Birkalla	7	4	1	2	15	11	+4	13	Qualification for Finals
4	Flinders United	7	2	3	2	8	12	−4	9 (Note: Head to head points: Flinders United 3, Football SA NTC 0.)	Qualification for Finals
5	Football SA NTC	7	3	0	4	8	12	−4	9	Qualification for Finals
6	Metro United	7	3	0	4	10	15	−5	9	
7	Salisbury Inter	7	3	0	4	8	13	−5	9	
8	Adelaide City	7	2	2	3	10	12	−2	8	
9	Adelaide University	7	1	2	4	11	14	−3	5	Qualification for Relegation play-off
10	Sturt Lions	7	1	2	4	6	16	−10	5	Relegation to SA Women's State League

Updated to match(es) played on 11 May 2024. Source: Dribl
Rules for classification: 1) points; 2) goal difference; 3) number of goals scored; 4) head to head record; 5) playoff match.

==== Results ====
Home \ Away	ACI	COM	UNI	FLI	NTC	MET	SAL	STL	WES	WTB
Adelaide City				1–1				4–0	0–4	
Adelaide Comets					4–0	4–2	6–2			3–0
Adelaide University	2–2					3–0	0–2			
Flinders United		1–1	3–2				1–2		0–5	
Football SA NTC	3–0			1–2					0–3	
Metro United	2–1				1–2			4–0		1–0
Salisbury Inter	0–2				0–1			2–0		0–3
Sturt Lions		3–0 (Note: Adelaide Comets won 4–0, match was awarded 3–0 to Sturt Lions.)	2–2	0–0						1–4
West Adelaide		0–3	2–0			5–0				
West Torrens Birkalla			3–2		2–1				3–3	

Updated to match(es) played on 11 May 2024. Source: Dribl
Legend: Blue = home team win; Yellow = draw; Red = away team win.

=== 2024 Women's State League South Australia ===
SA Women's State League
- Season: 2024
- Dates: 15 March–18 August
- Matches: 35
- Goals: 276 (7.89 per match)
- Biggest home win: Campbelltown City 25–0 Croydon FC (5 April)
- Biggest away win: Croydon FC 0–32 Elizabeth Grove (12 May)
- Highest scoring: Croydon FC 0–32 Elizabeth Grove (12 May)

The 2024 Women's State League South Australia season, known as the 2024 Go Sunny Solar Women's State League League for sponsorship reasons, was the second division of women's soccer in South Australia for 2024. The season ran from 15 March to 18 August, as a double round-robin over 18 rounds.

==== League table ====
Pos	Team	Pld	W	D	L	GF	GA	GD	Pts	Promotion or qualification
1	Campbelltown City	7	7	0	0	53	4	+49	21	Promotion to Women's National Premier Leagues SA
2	Elizabeth Grove	7	5	0	2	48	11	+37	15	Qualification for Promotion play-off
3	Modbury Vista	7	5	0	2	32	11	+21	15	
4	Adelaide Jaguars	7	4	1	2	40	8	+32	13	
5	Modbury Jets	7	4	1	2	35	10	+25	13	
6	South Adelaide Panthers	7	3	3	1	36	10	+26	12	
7	Western Strikers	7	1	2	4	10	24	−14	5	
8	The Cove	7	1	1	5	14	24	−10	4	
9	Fulham United	7	1	0	6	8	39	−31	3	
10	Croydon FC	7	0	0	7	0	135	−135	−3 (Note: Croydon FC were deducted three points for forfeiting their cup match against Football SA NTC.)	

Updated to match(es) played on 12 May 2024. Source: Dribl
Rules for classification: 1) points; 2) goal difference; 3) number of goals scored; 4) head to head record; 5) playoff match.

==== Results ====
Home \ Away	JAG	CAM	CDN	ELI	FUL	MOD	MVI	SAP	COV	STR
Adelaide Jaguars		2–4		2–1			1–2	1–1	6–0	
Campbelltown City			25–0	6–0	8–0			3–1		
Croydon FC	0–22			0–32	0–8					
Elizabeth Grove										5–0
Fulham United	0–6							0–7		0–3
Modbury Jets			17–0	0–1	3–0					5–0
Modbury Vista		1–2		2–3	12–0	7–2				
South Adelaide Panthers			20–0			2–2			2–1	
The Cove			11–0	1–6		0–6	0–3			
Western Strikers		0–5					3–5	3–3	1–1	

Updated to match(es) played on 12 May 2024. Source: Dribl
Legend: Blue = home team win; Yellow = draw; Red = away team win.

== Cup competitions ==
=== 2024 Federation Cup ===
2024 FSA Federation Cup
Tournament details
- Dates: 16 February–6 July
- Teams: 52

Final positions
- Champions: Campbelltown City (3rd title)
- Runners-up: Modbury Jets

The 2024 Football South Australia Federation Cup was the 111th running of the Federation Cup, the main soccer knockout cup competition in South Australia. Teams from the National Premier Leagues SA, SA State League 1, SA State League 2, Regional Leagues and Amateur Leagues participated.

==== Bracket ====
First round Third preliminary round
Adelaide Pumas	0
Seaford Rangers	2
Adelaide Hills Hawks	0
Adelaide Cobras	4
Ghan United	1
Adelaide Victory	4
Salisbury United	7
Rostrevor Old Collegians	0
Sacred Heart Old Collegians	2
Elizabeth Grove (a.e.t.)	3
Adelaide Titans	0
Northern Demons	3
Elizabeth Downs	6
Port Adelaide Pirates	3
Gawler Eagles	3
Noarlunga United	0
Unley United	1
Messinian Association Hawks	2
Western Strikers	6
Pembroke Old Scholars	0
Adelaide Blue Eagles	1
Playford City Patriots	0
Cumberland United	14
Ingle Farm	0
Modbury Vista	12
Naracoorte United	0
Mount Barker United	0
The Cove	3
Pontian Eagles	2
Adelaide University	1
West Adelaide	3
Eastern United	1
BOSA FC	0
Tea Tree Gully City	3
Vipers FC	1
Sturt Lions	2
Fulham United	15
International SC	0
Para Hils East	3
West Torrens Birkalla	2

Second round Fourth preliminary round
Seaford Rangers	0
Modbury Jets	4
Adelaide Cobras	1
Adelaide Victory	2
Salisbury United	0
North Eastern MetroStars	6
Elizabeth Grove	1
Croydon FC	7
Para Hills Knights	0
Northern Demons	3
Elizabeth Downs	3
Gawler Eagles	1
Adelaide City	2
South Adelaide Panthers	1
Messinian Association Hawks	1
Adelaide Olympic	3
Western Strikers	0
Campbelltown City	2
Adelaide Croatia Raiders	2 (2)
Adelaide Blue Eagles (p)	2 (4)
Cumberland United	4
Modbury Vista	0
The Cove	1
Pontian Eagles	0
Pitbulls FC	1
West Adelaide	3
Tea Tree Gully City	1
Adelaide Comets	4
Sturt Lions	3 (4)
Fulham United (p)	3 (5)
Para Hills East	1
FK Beograd	3

Third round Fifth preliminary round
Modbury Jets	2
Adelaide Victory	1
North Eastern MetroStars	1
Croydon FC	2
Northern Demons	3
Elizabeth Downs	0
Adelaide City	0
Adelaide Olympic	2
Campbelltown City	3
Adelaide Blue Eagles	1
Cumberland United	3
The Cove	1
West Adelaide	1
Adelaide Comets	3
Fulham United	1
FK Beogad	4

Quarter-finals; Sixth preliminary round
Modbury Jets	4
Croydon FC	0
Northern Demons	0
Adelaide Olympic	4
Campbelltown City	2
Cumberland United	1
Adelaide Comets	3
FK Beograd	0

Semi-finals; Seventh preliminary round
Modbury Jets	1
Adelaide Olympic	0
Campbelltown City	2
Adelaide Comets	0

Final
Modbury Jets	0
Campbelltown City	3

== Prize money ==
Prize money was based on results from the finals series, with the exception of Premiers prize money and the Women's State League, which does not have a finals series. Adelaide United Youth were not eligible for prize money.

Prize money for the Federation Cup has been halved, and the Women's National Premier Leagues SA champions will receive double from last season. The overall prize pool has been reduced from $119,000 to $113,500.

League Competitions	Result							Total	Change
League Competitions	Champions	Premiers	Runners-up	3rd	4th	5th	6th	Total	Change
National Premier Leagues SA	$18,000	$16,000	$8,000	$5,000	$2,000			$53,000	—
SA State League 1	$8,000	$7,000	$3,500	$2,500	$1,500	—		$22,500	—
SA State League 2	$3,500	$2,500	$1,000	$500		—		$8,000	—
Women's National Premier Leagues SA	$10,000	$4,000	$2,500	$1,000	—			$17,500	$5,000 (40%)
Women's SA State League	$1,000	—						$1,000	—
Cup Competitions	Result							Total	Change
Cup Competitions	Champions		Runners-up		Semi-finalists			Total	Change
Federation Cup	$5,500		$2,500		$1,000			$10,000	$10,500 (51%)
WNPL and WSL Cup	$1,000		$500		—			$1,500	—
Grand Total								$113,500	$5,500 (5%)
