= 2023 Football South Australia season =

Association football season in South Australia

Football South Australia
- Season: 2023
- Dates: 10 February–15 September

The 2023 Football South Australia season was the 117th season of soccer in South Australia. It was the 18th to be run by Football South Australia and the 11th under the National Premier Leagues banner.

== Changes from 2022 ==
2022 League	Promoted to league	Relegated from league
National Premier Leagues SA	Modbury Jets; West Adelaide	Cumberland United; West Torrens Birkalla
SA State League 1	Adelaide Cobras; Vipers FC	Adelaide University; Adelaide Hills Hawks
SA State League 2	–	–
Women's National Premier Leagues SA	Flinders United	Modbury Vista
SA Women's State League	Croydon FC; Sturt Lions	–

== Men's Competitions ==
=== 2023 National Premier Leagues South Australia ===
NPL South Australia
- Season: 2023
- Dates: 17 February–8 September
- Champions: Adelaide United Youth (1st title)
- Premiers: North Eastern MetroStars (10th title)
- Relegated: Sturt Lions; West Adelaide
- Matches: 132
- Goals: 455 (3.45 per match)
- Top goalscorer: James Temelkovski (North Eastern MetroStars) (25 goals)
- Biggest home win: Adelaide United Youth 6–2 South Adelaide Panthers (18 February)
- Biggest away win: Adelaide Olympic 0–6 Campbelltown City (6 May)
- Highest scoring: Adelaide United Youth 6–2 South Adelaide Panthers (18 February)
- Longest winning run: 8 games Campbelltown City
- Longest unbeaten run: 15 games North Eastern MetroStars
- Longest winless run: 14 games South Adelaide Panthers; West Adelaide
- Longest losing run: 5 games Adelaide United Youth; FK Beograd; South Adelaide Panthers

The 2023 National Premier Leagues South Australia season, known as the 2023 RAA National Premier League for sponsorship reasons, was the 117th season of first division soccer in South Australia, and the 11th under the National Premier Leagues banner. The format was a double round-robin over 22 rounds, followed by a finals series. The season began on 17 February and concluded on 8 September.

Adelaide United Youth were champions for the first time, defeating Modbury Jets 7–2 in the Grand Final. North Eastern MetroStars were premiers for the 10th time. Sturt Lions and West Adelaide were relegated.

==== League Table ====
Pos	Team	Pld	W	D	L	GF	GA	GD	Pts	Qualification or relegation
1	North Eastern MetroStars	22	18	2	2	65	17	+48	56	Qualification for Finals
2	Campbelltown City	22	17	2	3	56	18	+38	53	Qualification for Finals
3	Adelaide United Youth (C)	22	10	4	8	40	36	+4	34	Qualification for Finals
4	Adelaide City	22	8	7	7	38	32	+6	31	Qualification for Finals
5	Modbury Jets	22	9	3	10	46	50	−4	30	Qualification for Finals
6	Adelaide Comets	22	7	8	7	30	33	−3	29	Qualification for Finals
7	Croydon FC	22	7	7	8	39	39	0	28	
8	FK Beograd	22	8	4	10	33	42	−9	28	
9	Adelaide Olympic	22	6	7	9	29	45	−16	25	
10	South Adelaide Panthers	22	4	7	11	35	53	−18	19	
11	Sturt Lions (R)	22	3	7	12	24	47	−23	16	Relegation to SA State League 1
12	West Adelaide (R)	22	3	6	13	20	43	−23	15	Relegation to SA State League 1

Source: dribl
Rules for classification: 1) points; 2) goal difference; 3) number of goals scored; 4) head to head record; 5) playoff match.
(C) Champions; (R) Relegated

==== Results ====
Home \ Away	ACI	COM	OLY	ADL	CAM	CDN	FKB	MOD	MET	SAP	STL	WES
Adelaide City		4–3	5–1	0–2	1–2	1–1	1–0	4–0	0–0	2–2	2–0	4–0
Adelaide Comets	2–2		0–0	2–0	0–1	0–3	3–0	1–0	0–3	1–1	0–0	1–1
Adelaide Olympic	1–1	0–1		2–2	0–6	3–2	2–2	3–2	1–5	0–3	3–0	4–0
Adelaide United Youth	1–3	1–1	3–0		1–3	1–1	3–0	1–2	1–2	6–2	1–4	3–1
Campbelltown City	2–1	5–1	2–1	1–2		3–1	3–0	4–0	0–1	3–0	3–1	1–1
Croydon FC	1–0	2–2	0–1	1–2	0–2		3–1	3–2	1–6	3–1	5–2	3–1
FK Beograd	3–1	1–5	0–0	3–0	1–2	2–2		3–4	0–4	4–1	3–1	3–1
Modbury Jets	2–2	2–3	1–3	4–0	2–2	2–1	2–2		0–1	4–3	3–0	4–1
North Eastern MetroStars	4–0	2–0	4–0	1–2	3–2	2–2	1–2	5–1		5–1	4–1	2–0
South Adelaide Panthers	3–1	1–2	3–3	0–1	0–4	3–3	3–1	2–4	1–2		1–1	1–1
Sturt Lions	2–2	2–0	1–1	1–4	1–2	1–1	0–1	2–3	0–5	2–2		1–0
West Adelaide	0–1	2–2	2–0	2–2	0–3	1–0	0–1	3–2	2–3	0–1	1–1	

Source: dribl
Legend: Blue = home team win; Yellow = draw; Red = away team win.

==== Top Scorers ====
Rank	Player	Club	Goals
1	James Temelkovski	North Eastern MetroStars	25
2	Jonathon Rideout	South Adelaide Panthers	17
3	Hamish McCabe	Modbury Jets	16
4	Alexander Mullen	Campbelltown City	15
5	Gonzalo Rodriguez	Sturt Lions	12
6	Andre Carle	Croydon FC	11
7	Nicholas Bucco	Adelaide City	10
7	Michael Cittadini	North Eastern MetroStars	10
9	Aladin Irabona	Adelaide City	9
9	Christos Pounendis	Adelaide Olympic	9

==== Finals ====
Elimination Finals
4	Adelaide City	1
5	Modbury Jets	2
3	Adelaide United Youth (a.e.t.)	4
6	Adelaide Comets	3

Semi-finals
5	Modbury Jets	2	3	5
1	North Eastern MetroStars	3	0	3
3	Adelaide United Youth	2	3	5
2	Campbelltown City	1	1	2

Grand Final
5	Modbury Jets	2
3	Adelaide United Youth	7

===== Grand Final =====
8 September
19:30

Modbury Jets	2–7	Adelaide United Youth
H. McCabe 81'; L. McCabe 88'	Report	Madanha 8'; Jovanovic 38', 52'; Yull 42', 62'; Duzel 68'; Talladira 73'

ServiceFM Stadium, Gepps Cross
Attendance: 1,627
Referee: Daniel Cook

=== 2023 State League 1 South Australia ===
State League 1 South Australia
- Season: 2023
- Dates: 18 February–9 September
- Champions: Adelaide Croatia Raiders (5th title)
- Premiers: Adelaide Croatia Raiders (1st title)
- Promoted: Adelaide Croatia Raiders; Para Hills Knights
- Relegated: Eastern United; Port Adelaide Pirates
- Matches: 132
- Goals: 475 (3.6 per match)
- Top goalscorer: Riley Stam (Para Hills Knights) (21 goals)
- Biggest home win: Adelaide Croatia Raiders 6–1 Port Adelaide Pirates (17 June); Para Hills Knights 6–1 Eastern United (12 August)
- Biggest away win: Eastern United 1–5 Adelaide Croatia Raiders (15 July)
- Highest scoring: Eastern United 3–5 Port Adelaide Pirates (18 February); Para Hills Knights 5–3 Adelaide Croatia Raiders (10 June)
- Longest winning run: 4 games Adelaide Croatia Raiders; Adelaide Victory; Para Hills Knights
- Longest unbeaten run: 6 games West Torrens Birkalla
- Longest winless run: 8 games Port Adelaide Pirates
- Longest losing run: 8 games Port Adelaide Pirates
- All statistics correct as of 15 July 2023.

The 2023 State League 1 South Australia season was the 100th season of second division soccer in South Australia. The format was a double round-robin over 22 rounds, followed by a finals series. The season began on 18 February and concluded on 9 September.

Adelaide Croatia Raiders were champions for the fifth time, defeating Para Hills Knights 3–2 in the Grand Final. Adelaide Croatia Raiders were also premiers for the first time, and were promoted with Para Hills Knights. Eastern United and Port Adelaide Pirates were relegated.

==== League Table ====
Pos	Team	Pld	W	D	L	GF	GA	GD	Pts	Promotion, qualification or relegation
1	Adelaide Croatia Raiders (C, P)	22	13	2	7	56	34	+22	41	Promotion to National Premier Leagues SA and qualification for Finals
2	Para Hills Knights (P)	22	13	1	8	53	42	+11	40	Qualification for Finals
3	Playford City Patriots	22	10	6	6	50	31	+19	36	Qualification for Finals
4	Adelaide Cobras	22	11	3	8	36	29	+7	36	Qualification for Finals
5	Cumberland United	22	10	4	8	32	31	+1	34	Qualification for Finals
6	West Torrens Birkalla	22	10	4	8	37	37	0	34	Qualification for Finals
7	Adelaide Blue Eagles	22	9	5	8	39	37	+2	32	
8	Adelaide Victory	22	8	7	7	39	36	+3	31	
9	Fulham United	22	9	2	11	32	36	−4	29	
10	Vipers FC	22	7	5	10	42	49	−7	26	
11	Eastern United (R)	22	6	4	12	33	56	−23	22	Relegation to SA State League 2
12	Port Adelaide Pirates (R)	22	4	1	17	26	57	−31	13	Relegation to SA State League 2

Source: dribl
Rules for classification: 1) points; 2) goal difference; 3) number of goals scored; 4) head to head record; 5) playoff match.
(C) Champions; (P) Promoted; (R) Relegated

==== Results ====
Home \ Away	ABE	COB	ACR	VIC	CMB	ESU	FUL	PHK	PCP	PAP	VIP	WTB
Adelaide Blue Eagles		2–3	2–4	1–2	1–0	4–2	3–0	2–3	0–2	2–1	2–1	3–2
Adelaide Cobras	1–2		1–1	1–0	1–3	2–0	2–2	3–0	2–1	1–0	2–1	0–1
Adelaide Croatia Raiders	3–1	4–1		2–3	2–1	2–2	4–2	1–2	2–1	6–1	5–0	1–2
Adelaide Victory	1–1	2–1	0–1		1–0	3–3	2–1	0–3	2–2	2–2	1–1	5–0
Cumberland United	2–1	2–1	3–1	0–0		0–0	0–4	4–2	1–1	3–0	2–1	1–0
Eastern United	3–2	2–2	1–5	3–2	2–0		2–1	1–2	1–2	3–5	0–2	2–1
Fulham United	1–1	1–2	0–2	3–0 (Note: Fulham United and Adelaide Victory drew 0–0, the match was awarded 3–0 to Fulham United.)	0–2	4–0		0–1	2–0	1–0	2–1	1–3
Para Hills Knights	2–3	3–1	5–3	2–4	2–0	6–1	1–2		2–4	1–3	5–2	2–4
Playford City Patriots	3–3	1–2	0–1	2–2	3–2	5–0	6–1	1–2		2–0	4–1	2–2
Port Adelaide Pirates	0–2	0–3	0–3 (Note: Adelaide Croatia Raiders won 2–1, match was awarded 3–0 to Adelaide Croatia Raiders.)	3–2	2–3	0–1	1–2	0–3	0–4		3–2	2–4
Vipers FC	1–1	0–4	3–2	4–1	4–1	4–3	2–0	2–2	3–3	4–1		2–2
West Torrens Birkalla	0–0	1–0	3–1	0–4	2–2	2–1	1–2	1–2	0–1	3–2	3–1	

Source: dribl
Legend: Blue = home team win; Yellow = draw; Red = away team win.

==== Top Scorers ====
Rank	Player	Club	Goals
1	Riley Stam	Para Hills Knights	21
2	Donatien Niyonkuru	Adelaide Croatia Raiders	16
3	Dante Isla Cacciavillani	Adelaide Blue Eagles	15
4	Nicholas Harpas	West Torrens Birkalla	13
5	Daniel Ryan	Playford City Patriots	12
5	Craig Shearer	Vipers FC	12
7	Marko Bogdanovic	Adelaide Victory	11
8	Alex Demasi	Adelaide Victory	9
8	Rhys Townsend	Playford City Patriots	9
10	3 players		8

==== Finals ====
The winner of the Finals are crowned the champions and are promoted, unless they have already earned promotion as premiers, in which case the runner-up is promoted.

Elimination Finals
3	Playford City Patriots	2
6	West Torrens Birkalla (a.e.t.)	4
4	Adelaide Cobras	1
5	Cumberland United	2

Semi-finals
6	West Torrens Birkalla	0	0	0
1	Adelaide Croatia Raiders	1	0	1
5	Cumberland United	1	1	1
2	Para Hills Knights	3	3	6

Grand Final
1	Adelaide Croatia Raiders	3
2	Para Hills Knights	2

===== Grand Final =====
9 September
19:00

Adelaide Croatia Raiders	3–2	Para Hills Knights
Costa 1'; Odenwalder 87'; Da Silva 90+5' (pen.)	Report	Stam 14', 30'

ServiceFM Stadium, Gepps Cross
Referee: Christian Verdicchio

=== 2023 State League 2 South Australia ===
State League 2 South Australia
- Season: 2023
- Dates: 18 February–9 September
- Champions: Salisbury United (4th title)
- Premiers: Salisbury United (2nd title)
- Promoted: Salisbury United; Western Strikers
- Matches: 132
- Goals: 449 (3.4 per match)
- Top goalscorer: Brian Elewaut (Seaford Rangers) (17 goals)
- Biggest home win: Modbury Vista 7–0 Mount Barker United (5 August)
- Biggest away win: Modbury Vista 0–5 Western Strikers (18 February); Mount Barker United 0–5 Adelaide University (22 April); Mount Barker United 0–5 Modbury Vista (30 April)
- Highest scoring: Northern Demons 7–3 The Cove (1 April)
- Longest winning run: 7 games Salisbury United
- Longest unbeaten run: 8 games Seaford Rangers*; Western Strikers
- Longest winless run: 7 games Adelaide Hills Hawks; The Cove
- Longest losing run: 7 games Adelaide Hills Hawks
- All statistics correct as of 15 July 2021.

The 2023 State League 2 South Australia season was the 56th season of third division soccer in South Australia. The format was a double round-robin over 22 rounds, followed by a finals series. The season began on 18 February and concluded on 9 September.

Salisbury United were champions for the fourth time, defeating Western Strikers 2–1 after extra time in the Grand Final. Salisbury United were also premiers for the second time, and were promoted with Western Strikers.

==== League Table ====
Pos	Team	Pld	W	D	L	GF	GA	GD	Pts	Promotion or qualification
1	Salisbury United (C, P)	22	18	1	3	56	15	+41	55	Promotion to SA State League 1 and qualification for Finals
2	Seaford Rangers	22	12	4	6	40	32	+8	40	Qualification for Finals
3	Western Strikers (P)	22	11	3	8	46	29	+17	36	Qualification for Finals
4	Modbury Vista	22	10	5	7	44	34	+10	35	Qualification for Finals
5	Adelaide University	22	10	5	7	38	28	+10	35	Qualification for Finals
6	Gawler Eagles	22	9	5	8	37	33	+4	32	Qualification for Finals
7	Noarlunga United	22	9	3	10	39	43	−4	30	
8	Northern Demons	22	8	4	10	35	43	−8	28	
9	Pontian Eagles	22	7	4	11	28	35	−7	25	
10	The Cove	22	6	5	11	41	51	−10	23	
11	Mount Barker United	22	5	4	13	20	53	−33	19	
12	Adelaide Hills Hawks	22	4	3	15	25	53	−28	15	

Source: dribl
Rules for classification: 1) points; 2) goal difference; 3) number of goals scored; 4) head to head record; 5) playoff match.
(C) Champions; (P) Promoted

==== Results ====
Home \ Away	ADH	UNI	GAW	MVI	MBU	NOA	NDE	PON	SAL	SEA	COV	STR
Adelaide Hills Hawks		0–1	2–1	1–1	2–2	2–6	0–1	1–2	2–5	0–1	4–4	0–3
Adelaide University	3–0		3–0 (Note: Adelaide University and Gawler Eagles drew 1–1, match was awarded 3–0 to Adelaide University.)	1–1	0–0	5–2	1–2	1–0	1–1	0–3	2–2	3–2
Gawler Eagles	4–0	1–2		2–2	0–0	1–2	2–2	1–2	0–3	5–2	5–2	0–0
Modbury Vista	1–0	2–0	2–3		7–0	3–2	4–2	3–2	1–5	0–1	2–2	0–5
Mount Barker United	1–0	0–5	1–5	0–5		2–3	1–2	0–1	1–0	2–3	1–2	0–0
Noarlunga United	0–2	1–0	0–1	1–3	3–0		2–1	3–3	1–3	2–0	2–2	1–0
Northern Demons	0–3 (Note: Northern Demons won 5–1, match was awarded 3–0 to Adelaide Hills Hawks.)	2–5	0–1	0–0	5–1	3–2		1–2	0–3	0–0	7–3	2–2
Pontian Eagles	4–2	0–2	2–0	2–1	0–1	1–1	1–2		0–1	2–2	2–2	1–2
Salisbury United	4–0	1–0	3–0	1–0	4–1	3–1	3–0	2–0		3–0	2–0	4–2
Seaford Rangers	5–3	1–1	1–1	1–2	3–1	2–1	2–0	3–0	0–4		3–1	1–3
The Cove	0–1	3–1	1–2	3–1	2–3	0–3	0–1	3–1	4–3	1–3		4–0
Western Strikers	6–0	4–1	1–2	0–3 (Note: Western Strikers won 3–1, match was awarded 3–0 to Modbury Vista.)	1–2	6–0	5–2	1–0	1–0	0–3	1–0	

Source: dribl
Legend: Blue = home team win; Yellow = draw; Red = away team win.

==== Top Scorers ====
Rank	Player	Club	Goals
1	Brian Elewaut	Seaford Rangers	17
2	Andreas Wiens	Western Strikers	16
3	Thomas Foglia	Noarlunga United	14
3	Benjamin Trotta	Modbury Vista	14
5	Yiannis Nestoras	Northern Demons	13
6	Joshua Kaye	Salisbury United	11
7	Anthony Dimas	Western Strikers	9
7	Thiago Novis	Adelaide University	9
9	5 players		8

==== Finals ====
The winner of the Finals are crowned the champions and are promoted, unless they have already earned promotion as premiers, in which case the runner-up is promoted.

Elimination Finals
4	Modbury Vista (p)	1 (4)
5	Adelaide University	1 (3)
3	Western Strikers	3
6	Gawler Eagles	1

Semi-finals
4	Modbury Vista	2	0	2
1	Salisbury United	3	1	4
3	Western Strikers	5	2	7
2	Seaford Rangers	1	1	2

Grand Final
1	Salisbury United	2
3	Western Strikers	1

===== Grand Final =====
9 September
16:30

Salisbury United	2–1 (a.e.t.)	Western Strikers
Taylor 44' (pen.), 117' (pen.)	Report	Violi 18'

ServiceFM Stadium, Gepps Cross
Referee: Liam Miller

== Women's Competitions ==
=== 2023 Women's National Premier Leagues South Australia ===
WNPL South Australia
- Season: 2023
- Dates: 10 March–15 September
- Champions: Salisbury Inter (2nd title)
- Premiers: Adelaide Comets (1st title)
- Relegated: Fulham United
- Matches: 90
- Goals: 309 (3.43 per match)
- Top goalscorer: Chrissy Panagaris (Adelaide Comets) (14 goals)
- Biggest home win: West Adelaide 10–0 Fulham United (16 June)
- Biggest away win: Flinders United 1–9 Adelaide Comets (26 May)
- Highest scoring: Flinders United 1–9 Adelaide Comets (26 May); West Adelaide 10–0 Fulham United (16 June)

The 2023 Women's National Premier Leagues South Australia season, known as the 2023 Go Sunny Solar Women's National Premier League for sponsorship reasons, was the first division of women's soccer in South Australia for 2023, and the eighth under the Women's National Premier Leagues banner. The format is a double round-robin over 18 rounds, followed by a finals series. The season began on 10 March and concluded on 11 August.

Salisbury Inter were champions for the second time, defeating Football SA NTC 7–6 on penalties, after a 2–2 draw in the Grand Final. Adelaide Comets were premiers for the first time. Fulham United were relegated, and Adelaide University avoided relegation, defeating Modbury Vista 8–0 in the promotion/relegation playoff.

==== League Table ====
Pos	Team	Pld	W	D	L	GF	GA	GD	Pts	Qualification or relegation
1	Adelaide Comets	18	15	1	2	64	17	+47	46	Qualification for Finals
2	Football SA NTC	18	11	3	4	36	18	+18	36	Qualification for Finals
3	Salisbury Inter (C)	18	10	2	6	35	19	+16	32	Qualification for Finals
4	Adelaide City	18	9	2	7	31	22	+9	29	Qualification for Finals
5	West Adelaide	18	8	3	7	43	24	+19	27	Qualification for Finals
6	Metro United	18	6	4	8	21	33	−12	22	
7	West Torrens Birkalla	18	6	1	11	25	40	−15	19	
8	Flinders United	18	5	3	10	18	39	−21	18	
9	Adelaide University (O)	18	5	1	12	22	37	−15	16	Qualification for Relegation play-off
10	Fulham United (R)	18	5	0	13	14	60	−46	15	Relegation to SA Women's State League

Source: dribl
Rules for classification: 1) points; 2) goal difference; 3) number of goals scored; 4) head to head record; 5) playoff match.
(C) Champions; (O) Play-off winners; (R) Relegated

==== Results ====
Home \ Away	ACI	COM	UNI	FLI	NTC	FUL	MET	SAL	WES	WTB
Adelaide City		1–3	2–1	5–0	1–1	5–1	0–1	1–0	1–3	1–0
Adelaide Comets	6–0		1–0	3–0	2–0	7–0	4–0	2–4	3–1	4–0
Adelaide University	0–3	1–3		0–1	1–2	0–1	3–1	1–0	2–2	1–4
Flinders United	1–3	1–9	2–3		0–1	1–2	1–2	1–1	1–0	2–1
Football SA NTC	1–0	0–2	6–1	1–1		2–0	5–0	3–2	2–1	2–0
Fulham United	1–0	1–3	1–3	0–1	0–5		0–2	0–4	1–0	0–3
Metro United	0–4	3–2	1–0	2–2	1–1	3–4		1–0	0–0	2–3
Salisbury Inter	1–0	0–4	3–1	2–1	1–3	6–0	2–1		2–0	3–0
West Adelaide	3–2	4–5	3–1	3–0	3–0	10–0	2–0	0–0		6–0
West Torrens Birkalla	0–2	1–1	1–3	1–2	2–1	5–2	0–2	0–4	4–2	

Source: dribl
Legend: Blue = home team win; Yellow = draw; Red = away team win.

==== Top Scorers ====
Rank	Player	Club	Goals
1	Chrissy Panagaris	Adelaide Comets	14
2	Georgie Nicola	Adelaide Comets	12
3	Isabel Hodgson	Adelaide City	11
4	Roxanne Dodd	Salisbury Inter	10
4	Victoria Mansueto	West Torrens Birkalla	10
6	Khal Adam Khan	Adelaide Comets	9
7	Joanna Katsabis	Adelaide Comets	8
7	Racheal Quigley	West Adelaide	8
7	Haruna Sugihara	Salisbury Inter	8
10	3 players		7

==== Finals ====
Qualifying/Elimination Final
2	Football SA NTC	0
3	Salisbury Inter	1
4	Adelaide City	3
5	West Adelaide	0

Semi-finals
1	Adelaide Comets	0
3	Salisbury Inter	2
2	Football SA NTC (p)	1 (7)
4	Adelaide City	1 (6)

Preliminary Final
1	Adelaide Comets	2 (4)
2	Football SA NTC (p)	2 (5)

Grand Final
3	Salisbury Inter	2 (7)
2	Football SA NTC	2 (6)

=== 2023 Women's State League South Australia ===
WSL South Australia
- Season: 2023
- Dates: 10 March–13 August
- Champions: Sturt Lions
- Promoted: Sturt Lions
- Matches: 80
- Goals: 370 (4.63 per match)
- Top goalscorer: Florence Russell (Sturt Lions) (29 goals)
- Biggest home win: South Adelaide Panthers 13–0 The Cove (13 August)
- Biggest away win: Elizabeth Grove 0–11 Modbury Vista (7 May)
- Highest scoring: South Adelaide Panthers 13–0 The Cove (13 August)

The 2023 Women's State League South Australia season, known as the 2023 Go Sunny Solar Women's State League for sponsorship reasons, was the second division of women's soccer in South Australia. The format is a double round-robin over 18 rounds. The season began on 10 March and concluded on 13 August.

Sturt Lions were premiers for the first time.

==== League Table ====
Pos	Team	Pld	W	D	L	GF	GA	GD	Pts	Promotion or qualification
1	Sturt Lions (C, P)	18	15	0	3	68	12	+56	45	Promotion to Women's National Premier Leagues SA
2	Modbury Vista	18	14	2	2	80	17	+63	44	Qualification for Promotion play-off
3	South Adelaide Panthers	18	14	1	3	75	21	+54	43	
4	Modbury Jets	18	9	4	5	46	25	+21	31	
5	Campbelltown City	18	8	3	7	34	36	−2	27	
6	Adelaide Jaguars	18	8	1	9	30	41	−11	25	
7	Adelaide Hills Hawks	18	6	3	9	26	34	−8	21	Withdrew at end of season (Note: Adelaide Hills Hawks withdrawal was announced on 11 November 2023, along with the announcement of Western Strikers' entry into the competition.)
8	Croydon FC	18	4	1	13	31	62	−31	13	
9	The Cove	18	3	2	13	16	80	−64	11	
10	Elizabeth Grove	18	0	1	17	9	87	−78	1	

Source: dribl
Rules for classification: 1) points; 2) goal difference; 3) number of goals scored; 4) head to head record; 5) playoff match.
(C) Champions; (P) Promoted

==== Results ====
Home \ Away	ADH	JAG	CAM	CRO	ELI	MOD	MVI	SAP	STU	COV
Adelaide Hills Hawks		2–3	1–2	0–2	3–1	2–2	1–1	1–3	2–1	1–0
Adelaide Jaguars	0–3		2–2	3–0	2–1	0–1	1–2	1–8	0–5	1–0
Campbelltown City	1–0	0–5		1–0	8–0	2–2	2–3	2–6	0–1	2–1
Croydon FC	1–3	2–3	2–2		10–2	2–7	0–10	1–3	0–7	0–1
Elizabeth Grove	0–4	0–1	1–3	0–2		0–4	0–11	1–4	0–4	0–0
Modbury Jets	4–2	2–1	1–2	4–3	6–1		1–0	1–2	0–1	7–1
Modbury Vista	6–0	4–3	2–0	6–1	6–0	2–2		1–0	2–1	7–0
South Adelaide Panthers	3–0	5–1	5–0	2–0	6–1	1–1	2–7		3–1	13–0
Sturt Lions	3–0	3–1	4–0	5–1	9–0	1–0	3–1	2–0		7–1
The Cove	1–1	1–2	0–5	3–4	4–1	2–1	0–9	0–9	1–10	

Source: dribl
Legend: Blue = home team win; Yellow = draw; Red = away team win.

==== Top Scorers ====
Rank	Player	Club	Goals
1	Florence Russell	Sturt Lions	29
2	Caitlyn Williams	Modbury Vista	19
3	Mia Perkins	South Adelaide Panthers	17
4	Ailin Marshall	Modbury Vista	15
4	Kaylee Wakeling	Adelaide Jaguars	15
6	Nikki Henkens	South Adelaide Panthers	14
6	Kendall Kalaba	Campbelltown City	14
8	Ellena Vega	Modbury Vista	13
8	Pirrie Weeks	Modbury Vista	13
10	2 players		10

==== Promotion Play-off ====
27 August
12:00

Modbury Vista	0–8	Adelaide University
	Report	Bjorneboe Holgersen 14', 61', 62', 68', 87'; Sparrow 30'; Todino 46'; Trimboli 73'

ServiceFM Stadium, Gepps Cross
Referee: Curtis Wordsworth

== Cup Competitions ==
=== 2023 Federation Cup ===
2023 FSA Federation Cup
Tournament details
- Dates: 10 February–24 June
- Teams: 46

Final positions
- Champions: North Eastern MetroStars (6th title)
- Runners-up: Campbelltown City

The 2023 Football South Australia Federation Cup was the 110th running of the Federation Cup, the main soccer knockout competition in South Australia. Teams from the National Premier Leagues SA, SA State League 1, SA State League 2, Regional Leagues and Amateur Leagues participated.

North Eastern MetroStars were champions for the sixth time, defeating Campbelltown City 3–2 after extra time in the final.

==== Bracket ====
First round Third preliminary round
Adelaide Uni Grads Blue	2
Pembroke Old Scholars	0
Playford City Patriots	1
Adelaide Victory	0
The Cove	2
Northern Demons	3
Pitbulls FC	0
Modbury Vista	4
Ghan United	5
Para Hills Knights	3
Port Adelaide Pirates	1
Vipers FC	2
Mount Barker United	1
Adelaide University	2
Gawler Eagles	0
West Torrens Birkalla	4
Seaford Rangers (p)	1 (5)
Fulham United	1 (4)
Para Hills East	0
Eastern United	3
Adelaide Blue Eagles	2
Adelaide Hills Hawks	1
Cumberland United	7
Para Hills West	0
Rostrevor Old Collegians	1
Western Strikers	2
Naracoorte United	0
Adelaide Cobras	5

Second round Fourth preliminary round
Campbelltown City	6
Adelaide Uni Grads Blue	0
Playford City Patriots	3
South Adelaide Panthers	1
Adelaide City	7
Pontian Eagles	0
Northern Demons	2
Adelaide Olympic	3
Modbury Vista	2
Ghan United	6
Vipers FC	0
Adelaide University	1
Croydon FC	7
Tea Tree Gully City	1
Sturt Lions	6
Salisbury United	1
West Adelaide	4
West Torrens Birkalla	5
Seaford Rangers	1
Noarlunga United (a.e.t.)	2
Eastern United	2
Elizabeth Grove	1
Adelaide Blue Eagles	1
Modbury Jets	3
Adelaide Croatia Raiders	0
Adelaide Comets	3
Cumberland United	0
North Eastern MetroStars	4
Western Strikers	0
FK Beograd	7
Elizabeth Downs	4
Adelaide Cobras (a.e.t.)	5

Third round Fifth preliminary round
Campbelltown City	3
Playford City Patriots	2
Adelaide City	6
Adelaide Olympic	0
Ghan United	2
Adelaide University	3
Croydon FC	3
Sturt Lions	1
West Torrens Birkalla (p)	1 (5)
Noarlunga United	1 (4)
Eastern United (a.e.t.)	1
Modbury Jets	0
Adelaide Comets	1
North Eastern MetroStars	4
FK Beograd	1
Adelaide Cobras	3

Quarter-finals; Sixth preliminary round
Campbelltown City	1
Adelaide City	0
Adelaide University	0
Croydon FC	3
West Torrens Birkalla	2
Eastern United	0
North Eastern MetroStars	4
Adelaide Cobras	2

Semi-finals; Seventh preliminary round
Campbelltown City	1
Croydon FC	0
West Torrens Birkalla	0
North Eastern MetroStars	5

Final
Campbelltown City	2
North Eastern MetroStars (a.e.t.)	3

=== 2023 WNPL and WSL Cup ===
2023 WNPL and WSL Cup
Tournament details
- Dates: 5 April–18 August
- Teams: 30

Final positions
- Champions: Adelaide Comets (1st title)
- Runners-up: Salisbury Inter

The 2023 WNPL and WSL Cup is the main women's soccer knockout competition in South Australia for 2023. Senior and reserve teams from the Women's National Premier Leagues South Australia and senior teams from the Women's State League South Australia participated.

Adelaide Comets were champions for the first time, deferating Salisbury Inter 1–0 after extra time in the final.

==== Bracket ====
First round
West Torrens Birkalla Reserves	1
Croydon FC	0
Adelaide University Reserves
Metro United	w/o
Adelaide Hills Hawks	1
Adelaide City Reserves	2
Adelaide Jaguars	0
Football SA NTC	7
Fulham United	4
Campbelltown City	0
Fulham United Reserves
Sturt Lions	w/o
Adelaide Comets	14
The Cove	0
Flinders United	w/o
South Adelaide Panthers
Football SA NTC Reserves	2
Metro United Reserves	1
Salisbury Inter	8
Elizabeth Grove	0
Modbury Vista	5
Flinders United Reserves	0
West Adelaide Reserves
West Adelaide	w/o
Salisbury Inter Reserves	1
Adelaide Comets Reserves	2
Adelaide University	6
Modbury Jets	0

Second round
West Torrens Birkalla Reserves	0
Metro United	3
West Torrens Birkalla	w/o
Adelaide City Reserves
Football SA NTC	6
Fulham United	0
Sturt Lions	1
Adelaide Comets	7
Flinders United	5
Football SA NTC Reserves	1
Salisbury Inter	6
Modbury Vista	0
West Adelaide	3
Adelaide City	5
Adelaide Comets Reserves	1
Adelaide University	5

Quarter-finals
Metro United	0
West Torrens Birkalla	1
Football SA NTC	0
Adelaide Comets	4
Flinders United	2
Salisbury Inter	4
Adelaide City (a.e.t.)	1
Adelaide University	0

Semi-finals
West Torrens Birkalla	0
Adelaide Comets	2
Salisbury Inter	4
Adelaide City	3

Final
Adelaide Comets (a.e.t.)	1
Salisbury Inter	0

== Prize money ==
Prize money is based on results from the finals series, with the exception of Premiers prize money and the Women's State League, which does not have a finals series. Adelaide United Youth are not eligible for prize money.

League Competitions	Result							Total	Change
League Competitions	Champions	Premiers	Runners-up	3rd	4th	5th	6th	Total	Change
National Premier Leagues SA	$18,000	$16,000	$8,000	$5,000	$2,000			$53,000	$6,500 (14%)
SA State League 1	$8,000	$7,000	$3,500	$2,500	$1,500	—		$22,500	$3,000 (15%)
SA State League 2	$3,500	$2,500	$1,000	$500		—		$8,000	$2,000 (33%)
Women's National Premier Leagues SA	$5,000	$4,000	$2,500	$1,000	—			$12,500	
Women's SA State League	$1,000	—						$1,000	
Cup Competitions	Result							Total	Change
Cup Competitions	Champions		Runners-up		Semi-finalists			Total	Change
Federation Cup	$10,000		$5,500		$2,500			$20,500	$10,500 (105%)
WNPL and WSL Cup	$1,000		$500		—			$1,500	
Grand Total								$119,000	$22,000 (Note: Only includes men's competitions.) (27%)
