= 2025 Football South Australia season =

Association football season in South Australia

Football South Australia
- Season: 2025

The 2025 Football South Australia season is the 119th season of soccer in South Australia. It is the 20th to be run by Football South Australia and the 13th under the National Premier Leagues banner.

== Changes from 2024 season ==
=== League changes ===
State League 2 South Australia was expanded from 12 teams to 16, splitting into northern and southern conferences of eight teams each.

=== Pre-season team movements ===
2024 league	Promoted to league	Relegated from league
NPL SA	Playford City; West Torrens Birkalla	Adelaide Olympic; South Adelaide Panthers
State League 1	Pontian Eagles; The Cove	Adelaide Atletico; Western Strikers
State League 2	Adelaide Titans; Elizabeth Grove; Ghan United; Salisbury Inter	–
Women's NPL SA	Campbelltown City	Sturt Lions
Women's State League	–	–

=== Team changes ===
- Adelaide Victory FC merged with Adelaide Atletico, adopting the latter's name.

== 2025 National Premier Leagues South Australia ==
National Premier Leagues SA
- Season: 2025
- Dates: 21 February–12 September
- Champions: Croydon FC
- Premiers: North Eastern MetroStars
- Relegated: Modbury Jets; Adelaide Croatia Raiders
- Matches: 132
- Goals: 452 (3.42 per match)
- Top goalscorer: Owen Windsor (15 goals)
- Biggest home win: Playford 8–1 Para Hills; 1 March 2025
- Biggest away win: Campbelltown 1–6 FK Beograd; 15 August 2025
- Highest scoring: Playford 8–1 Para Hills; 1 March 2025
- Longest winning run: 8 matches North Eastern MetroStars
- Longest unbeaten run: 10 matches North Eastern MetroStars
- Longest winless run: 9 matches Adelaide Croatia Raiders
- Longest losing run: 5 matches Adelaide Croatia Raiders

The 2025 National Premier Leagues South Australia season, known as the RAA National Premier League for sponsorship reasons, is the 119th season of first division soccer in South Australia, and the 13th under the National Premier Leagues banner. The premiers qualified for the inaugural season of the Australian Championship, the first intra-state post-season competition since the National Premier Leagues finals series in 2019.

=== League table ===
Pos	Team	Pld	W	D	L	GF	GA	GD	Pts	Qualification or relegation
1	North Eastern MetroStars (Q)	22	16	4	2	55	20	+35	52	Qualification to Australian Championship and finals
2	Adelaide City	22	12	3	7	43	30	+13	39	Qualification to Finals series
3	Croydon FC (C)	22	12	2	8	43	34	+9	38	Qualification to Finals series
4	FK Beograd	22	12	1	9	43	32	+11	37	Qualification to Finals series
5	Adelaide United Youth	22	9	5	8	40	44	−4	32	Qualification to Finals series
6	West Torrens Birkalla	22	9	4	9	33	35	−2	31	Qualification to Finals series
7	Campbelltown City	22	9	3	10	36	46	−10	30	
8	Playford City	22	9	2	11	45	41	+4	29	
9	Adelaide Comets	22	9	2	11	26	34	−8	29	
10	Para Hills Knights	22	6	5	11	37	56	−19	23	
11	Modbury Jets (R)	22	6	4	12	27	32	−5	22	Relegation to SA State League 1
12	Adelaide Croatia Raiders (R)	22	4	3	15	24	48	−24	15	Relegation to SA State League 1

Source: Dribl
Rules for classification: 1) points; 2) goal difference; 3) number of goals scored; 4) head to head record; 5) playoff match.
(C) Champions; (Q) Qualified for the phase indicated; (R) Relegated

=== Finals ===
Elimination Finals
4	FK Beograd	1
5	Adelaide United Youth	2
3	Croydon FC (p)	4
6	West Torrens Birkalla	1

Semi-finals
5	Adelaide United Youth	0	1	1
1	North Eastern MetroStars	1	2	3
3	Croydon FC (p)	1	0	1 (3)
2	Adelaide City	1	0	1 (2)

Grand Final
1	North Eastern MetroStars	1
3	Croydon FC	2

== 2025 State League 1 South Australia ==
SA State League 1
- Season: 2025
- Dates: 22 February–13 September
- Champions: West Adelaide
- Premiers: Sturt Lions
- Promoted: Sturt Lions; West Adelaide
- Relegated: Vipers FC; Pontian Eagles
- Matches: 132
- Goals: 435 (3.3 per match)
- Top goalscorer: Dante Isla Cacciavillani; Nathan Munro (15 goals)
- Biggest home win: Cove 8–1 Pontian Eagles; 9 August 2025
- Biggest away win: Adelaide Omonia Cobras 0–8 Fulham United; 7 June 2025
- Highest scoring: Sturt Lions 8–2 Cove; 23 February 2025
- Longest winning run: 9 matches Sturt Lions
- Longest unbeaten run: 11 matches Sturt Lions
- Longest winless run: 16 matches Pontian Eagles
- Longest losing run: 10 matches Pontian Eagles

The 2025 State League 1 South Australia season is the 102nd season of second division soccer in South Australia.

=== League table ===
Pos	Team	Pld	W	D	L	GF	GA	GD	Pts	Promotion, qualification or relegation
1	Sturt Lions (P)	22	19	1	2	58	18	+40	58	Promotion to the 2026 NPL SA and qualification for finals
2	Fulham United	22	14	3	5	48	22	+26	45	Qualification for finals
3	West Adelaide (C, P)	22	12	4	6	46	23	+23	40	Promotion to the 2026 NPL SA and qualification for finals
4	Salisbury United	22	11	4	7	36	32	+4	37	Qualification for finals
5	Adelaide Blue Eagles	22	10	4	8	44	27	+17	34	Qualification for finals
6	Cumberland United	22	10	1	11	35	34	+1	31	Qualification for finals
7	The Cove	22	9	4	9	40	44	−4	31	
8	Adelaide Olympic	22	8	6	8	30	33	−3	30	
9	Adelaide Omonia Cobras	22	7	4	11	32	45	−13	25	
10	South Adelaide Panthers	22	5	3	14	28	42	−14	18	
11	Vipers FC (R)	22	4	6	12	23	42	−19	18	Relegation to SA State League 2
12	Pontian Eagles (R)	22	2	2	18	15	73	−58	8	Relegation to SA State League 2

Source: Dribl
Rules for classification: 1) points; 2) goal difference; 3) number of goals scored; 4) head to head record; 5) playoff match.
(C) Champions; (P) Promoted; (R) Relegated

=== Finals ===
Elimination Finals
4	Salisbury United (p)	1 (4)
5	Adelaide Blue Eagles	1 (2)
3	West Adelaide	4
6	Cumberland United	0

Semi-finals
5	Salisbury United	0	1	1
1	Sturt Lions	1	3	4
3	West Adelaide	1	2	3
2	Fulham United	1	0	1

Grand Final
1	Sturt Lions	2
3	West Adelaide (a.e.t.)	3

== 2025 State League 2 South Australia ==
SA State League 2
- Season: 2025
- Dates: 28 February–13 September
- Champions: Eastern United
- Promoted: Eastern United; Adelaide Atletico
- Matches: 168
- Goals: 615 (3.66 per match)
- Top goalscorer: Denis Bacaj (29 goals)
- Biggest home win: Eastern United 7–0 Noarlunga United; 12 April 2025; Eastern United 8–1 Mount Barker United; 17 May 2025; Eastern United 7–0 Adelaide Hills Hawks; 26 June 2025
- Biggest away win: Eastern United 0–6 Mount Barker United; 29 March 2025
- Highest scoring: Northern Demons 5–5 Ghan United; 16 August 2025
- Longest winning run: 7 matches Adelaide University
- Longest unbeaten run: 7 matches Adelaide Atletico; Adelaide University; Modbury Vista
- Longest winless run: 7 matches Noarlunga United
- Longest losing run: 12 matches Adelaide Hills Hawks

The 2025 State League 2 South Australia season is the 58th season of third division soccer in South Australia.

=== North conference ===
==== League table ====
Pos	Team	Pld	W	D	L	GF	GA	GD	Pts	Qualification
1	Modbury Vista	21	13	3	5	52	34	+18	42	Qualification for promotion play-offs
2	Adelaide Atletico (P)	21	11	5	5	42	27	+15	38	Qualification for promotion play-offs
3	Salisbury Inter	21	11	5	5	44	28	+16	32 (Note: Ghan United and Salisbury Inter were deducted six points (and fined $2,000) for bringing the game into disrepute.)	Qualification for promotion play-offs
4	Gawler Eagles	21	9	2	10	31	33	−2	29	Qualification for promotion play-offs
5	Port Adelaide	21	8	3	10	34	36	−2	27	
6	Northern Demons	21	8	1	12	40	44	−4	25	
7	Ghan United	21	8	3	10	39	44	−5	21	
8	Elizabeth Grove	21	4	2	15	24	60	−36	14	

Source: Dribl
Rules for classification: 1) points; 2) goal difference; 3) number of goals scored; 4) head to head record; 5) playoff match.
(P) Promoted

=== South conference ===
==== League table ====
Pos	Team	Pld	W	D	L	GF	GA	GD	Pts	Qualification
1	Eastern United (C, P)	21	14	3	4	78	25	+53	45	Qualification for promotion play-offs
2	Adelaide University	21	11	7	3	47	27	+20	40	Qualification for promotion play-offs
3	Western Strikers	21	10	5	6	37	30	+7	35	Qualification for promotion play-offs
4	Seaford Rangers	21	9	6	6	39	36	+3	33	Qualification for promotion play-offs
5	Adelaide Titans	21	7	4	10	27	38	−11	25	
6	Noarlunga United	21	5	5	11	32	56	−24	20	
7	Mount Barker United	21	4	5	12	25	51	−26	17	
8	Adelaide Hills Hawks	21	3	7	11	24	46	−22	16	

Source: Dribl
Rules for classification: 1) points; 2) goal difference; 3) number of goals scored; 4) head to head record; 5) playoff match.
(C) Champions; (P) Promoted

=== Promotion play-offs ===
Promotion Play-off
N1	Modbury Vista	0
S1	Eastern United	2
Elimination Finals
N3	Salisbury Inter	2	1	3
S3	Western Strikers	2	2	4
S4	Seaford Rangers	1	1	2
N2	Adelaide Atletico	4	6	10
N4	Gawler Eagles	1	0	1
S2	Adelaide University	2	1	3

Preliminary Finals
N1	Modbury Vista	6
S3	Western Strikers	0
N2	Adelaide Atletico (p)	1 (4)
S2	Adelaide University	1 (3)

Promotion Play-off
N1	Modbury Vista	0
N2	Adelaide Atletico	2

== 2025 Federation Cup ==
2025 FSA Federation Cup
Tournament details
- Dates: 7 March–12 July
- Teams: 57

The 2025 Football South Australia Federation Cup was the 112th running of the Federation Cup, the main soccer knockout cup competition in South Australia. Teams from the National Premier Leagues SA, SA State League 1, SA State League 2, Regional Leagues and Amateur Leagues participated.

=== Bracket ===
First round Third preliminary round
Portland Panthers	0
Croydon Cougars	13
Ghan United	2
Northern Demons	1
Salisbury United	1
Playford City	2
Western Strikers	1
Gawler Eagles (a.e.t.)	2
Adelaide Omonia Cobras	0
Modbury Jets	1
Noarlunga United	2
Salisbury Inter	4
Elizabeth Downs	2
Seaford Rangers	5
Pontian Eagles	3
BOSA FC	1
Adelaide Comets	4
Modbury Vista	0
Para Hills East	5
South Adelaide Panthers	0
Apollo FC	0
Adelaide Croatia Raiders	15
Adelaide Brasfoot	4
Elizabeth Grove (a.e.t.)	5
Vipers FC	3
Eastern United	2
Cumberland United	3
Old Ignatians	0
Adelaide Hills Hawks	1
Para Hills West	0
Southern Knights
West Adelaide	w/o
Naracoorte United	0
The Cove	16
Mount Barker United	3
Adelaide Atletico	6
Para Hills United	1
Adelaide University	4
Gambier Centrals	1
Adelaide Olympic	5
Pitbulls FC	1
Adelaide Blue Eagles	3
International SC	0
Adelaide Titans	2
Fulham United	3
Port Adelaide	1
Sturt Lions	6
Angle Vale	1
Tea Tree Gully	w/o
Adelaide Eagles

Second round Fourth preliminary round
Croydon Cougars	0
Ghan United	5
Campbelltown City	2
Playford City	0
Gawler Eagles	1
North Eastern MetroStars	2
Modbury Jets	2
Para Hills Knights	1
West Torrens Birkalla (p)	1 (5)
Adelaide City	1 (4)
Croydon FC	2
Salisbury Inter	1
Seaford Rangers (p)	2 (3)
Pontian Eagles	2 (1)
Adelaide Comets	3
Para Hills East	1
Adelaide Croatia Raiders	6
Elizabeth Grove	0
Vipers FC	0
Cumberland United	3
Adelaide Hills Hawks	2
West Adelaide	1
The Cove	2
Adelaide Atletico	0
Adelaide University	1
Adelaide Olympic	2
FK Beograd	4
Adelaide Blue Eagles	0
Adelaide Titans	1
Fulham United	5
Sturt Lions	4
Tea Tree Gully	1

Third round Fifth preliminary round
Ghan United	1
Campbelltown City	3
North Eastern MetroStars	4
Modbury Jets	1
West Torrens Birkalla	3
Croydon FC	0
Seaford Rangers	2
Adelaide Comets	4
Adelaide Croatia Raiders	3
Cumberland United	2
Adelaide Hills Hawks	2
The Cove	0
Adelaide Olympic	0
FK Beograd	3
Fulham United	3
Sturt Lions	1

Quarter-finals; Sixth preliminary round
Campbelltown City	1
North Eastern MetroStars	3
West Torrens Birkalla	0
Adelaide Comets	3
Adelaide Croatia Raiders	2
Adelaide Hills Hawks	1
FK Beograd (p)	3 (5)
Fulham United	3 (4)

Semi-finals; Seventh preliminary round
North Eastern MetroStars (p)	1 (3)
Adelaide Comets	1 (1)
Adelaide Croatia Raiders	1
FK Beograd	0

Final
North Eastern MetroStars	3
Adelaide Croatia Raiders	1
