= 2026 Football South Australia season =

Association football season in South Australia

Football South Australia
- Season: 2026

The 2026 Football South Australia season was the 120th season of soccer in South Australia. It was the 21st to be run by Football South Australia and the 14th under the National Premier Leagues banner.

== Changes from 2025 season ==
=== League changes ===
State League 2 South Australia was expanded from 16 teams to 20, with 10 each within the northern and southern conferences. Ghan United moved from the northern conference to the southern conference.

=== Pre-season team movements ===
| 2025 league | Promoted to league | Relegated from league |
|---|---|---|
| NPL SA | Sturt Lions; West Adelaide | Modbury Jets; Adelaide Croatia Raiders |
| State League 1 | Eastern United; Adelaide Atletico VSC | Vipers FC; Pontian Eagles |
| State League 2 | Angle Vale; Barossa United; Elizabeth Downs; Plympton Bulldogs | – |
| Women's NPL SA | Modbury Vista | Adelaide City |
| Women's State League | – | – |

== 2026 National Premier Leagues South Australia ==
National Premier Leagues SA
- Season: 2026
- Dates: 27 February–13 September
- Champions: Adelaide City
- Premiers: Adelaide City
- Relegated: Para Hills Knights; Adelaide Comets
- Top goalscorer: George Blackwood (West Torrens Birkalla) – 23 goals
- Biggest home win: West Torrens Birkalla 11–0 Para Hills; 17 July 2026
- Biggest away win: Para Hills 0-9 North Eastern MetroStars; 27 June 2026
- Highest scoring: West Torrens Birkalla 11–0 Para Hills; 17 July 2026
- Longest winning run: 4 matches North Eastern MetroStars; Adelaide City; FK Beograd
- Longest unbeaten run: 14 matches Adelaide City
- Longest winless run: 22 matches Para Hills Knights
- Longest losing run: 13 matches Para Hills Knights

The 2026 National Premier Leagues South Australia season, known as the RAA National Premier League for sponsorship reasons, was the 120th season of first division soccer in South Australia, and the 14th under the National Premier Leagues banner.

=== League table ===
| Pos | Team | Pld | W | D | L | GF | GA | GD | Pts | Qualification or relegation |
|---|---|---|---|---|---|---|---|---|---|---|
| 1 | Adelaide City (Q, C) | 22 | 14 | 6 | 2 | 44 | 16 | +28 | 48 | Qualification to Australian Championship and Finals series |
| 2 | West Torrens Birkalla | 22 | 15 | 2 | 5 | 55 | 27 | +28 | 47 | Qualification to Finals series |
| 3 | North Eastern MetroStars | 22 | 13 | 5 | 4 | 53 | 23 | +30 | 44 | Qualification to Finals series |
| 4 | Playford City | 22 | 10 | 5 | 7 | 42 | 31 | +11 | 35 | Qualification to Finals series |
| 5 | FK Beograd | 22 | 10 | 3 | 9 | 35 | 30 | +5 | 33 | Qualification to Finals series |
| 6 | Croydon FC | 22 | 8 | 6 | 8 | 46 | 41 | +5 | 30 | Qualification to Finals series |
| 7 | Adelaide United Youth (Note: Team is ineligible to qualify for the 2026 Australian Championship as the youth team of an A-League club.) | 22 | 7 | 8 | 7 | 33 | 32 | +1 | 29 | |
| 8 | Campbelltown City | 22 | 8 | 5 | 9 | 35 | 36 | −1 | 29 | |
| 9 | Sturt Lions | 22 | 8 | 3 | 11 | 35 | 36 | −1 | 27 | |
| 10 | West Adelaide | 22 | 6 | 7 | 9 | 40 | 44 | −4 | 25 | |
| 11 | Adelaide Comets (R) | 22 | 5 | 5 | 12 | 25 | 38 | −13 | 20 | Relegation to SA State League 1 |
| 12 | Para Hills Knights (R) | 22 | 0 | 1 | 21 | 14 | 103 | −89 | 1 | Relegation to SA State League 1 |

Source: Dribl
Rules for classification: 1) points; 2) goal difference; 3) number of goals scored; 4) head to head record; 5) playoff match.
(C) Champions; (Q) Qualified for the phase indicated; (R) Relegated

=== Finals ===
==== Bracket ====
Elimination Finals
4 | Playford City | 3
5 | FK Beograd | 0
3 | North Eastern MetroStars | 2
6 | Croydon FC | 0

Semi-finals
4 | Playford City | 1 | 0 | 1
1 | Adelaide City | 2 | 6 | 8
3 | North Eastern MetroStars | 2 | 0 | 2
2 | West Torrens Birkalla | 2 | 2 | 4

Grand Final
1 | Adelaide City (p) | 2 (6)
2 | West Torrens Birkalla | 2 (5)

==== Elimination-finals ====
| 22 August 2026 | Playford City | 3–0 | FK Beograd | Edinburgh North |
| 15:00 | French 8'; Mullen 22'; Ryan 48' | Report | | Stadium: Ramsay Park; Referee: Jayden Betterman |

| 22 August 2026 | North Eastern MetroStars | 2–0 | Croydon FC | Klemzig |
| 19:00 | Niyonkuru 10', 30' | Report | | Stadium: T.K. Shutter Reserve; Referee: Regis Queffelec |

==== Semi-finals ====
First leg

| 29 August 2026 | Playford City | 1–2 | Adelaide City | Edinburgh North |
| 15:00 | Pounendis 40' | Report | Lawrie-Lattanzio 6'; Kasumovic 39' | Stadium: Ramsay Park; Referee: Curtis Wordsworth |

| 29 August 2026 | North Eastern MetroStars | 2–2 | West Torrens Birkalla | Klemzig |
| 19:00 | Andijanto 14' (o.g.); Niyonkuru 56' | Report | Blackwood 11'; Klaassen-Thomas 79' | Stadium: T.K. Shutter Reserve; Referee: Dion Turner |

Second leg

| 5 September 2026 | Adelaide City | 6–0 | Playford City | Oakden |
| 19:00 | Kasumovic 12', 50'; Kitano 38'; Lawrie-Lattanzio 56'; Costanzo 77'; Bressan 90+3' | Report | | Stadium: Adelaide City Park; Referee: Mavraidis Ktisti |

Adelaide City advance with 8–1 aggregate win

| 5 September 2026 | West Torrens Birkalla | 2–0 | North Eastern MetroStars | Camden Park |
| 19:00 | Tsarkani 64'; Blackwood 82' | Report | | Stadium: Jack Smith Park; Referee: David Cavaiuolo |

West Torrens Birkalla advance with 4–2 aggregate win

==== Final ====
| 11 September 2026 | Adelaide City | 2–2 (a.e.t.) (6–5 p) | West Torrens Birkalla | Gepps Cross |
| 19:30 | Western 65'; Welsh 90+2' (o.g.) | Report | Tsarkani 12'; Blackwood 37' | Stadium: ServiceFM Stadium; Referee: Christian Verdicchio |
| | Penalties |
| | O'Neil (penalty scored); Kitano (penalty scored); Parhas (penalty scored); Schimizzi (penalty scored); Battistella (penalty missed); Western (penalty scored); Francese (penalty scored) | | Christofilos (penalty scored); Blackwood (penalty missed); Welsh (penalty scored); Ayoubi (penalty scored); Conway (penalty scored); Nuur Abdullahi (penalty scored); D'Arrigo (penalty missed) |

== 2026 State League 1 South Australia ==
SA State League 1
- Season: 2026
- Dates: 28 February–13 September
- Premiers: Adelaide Croatia Raiders
- Promoted: Adelaide Croatia Raiders
- Relegated: Salisbury United; South Adelaide Panthers
- Top goalscorer: Luke Fusco (Fulham United) (12 goals)
- Biggest home win: Adelaide Croatia Raiders 7–0 Adelaide Omonia Cobras; 27 June 2026
- Longest winning run: 6 matches Adelaide Croatia Raiders
- Longest unbeaten run: 8 matches Adelaide Croatia Raiders
- Longest winless run: 10 matches South Adelaide Panthers
- Longest losing run: 7 matches Salisbury United

The 2026 State League 1 South Australia season was the 103rd season of second division soccer in South Australia.

=== League table ===
| Pos | Team | Pld | W | D | L | GF | GA | GD | Pts | Promotion, qualification or relegation |
|---|---|---|---|---|---|---|---|---|---|---|
| 1 | Adelaide Croatia Raiders (P, C) | 22 | 15 | 2 | 5 | 56 | 26 | +30 | 47 | Promotion to the 2027 NPL SA and qualification for Finals series |
| 2 | Modbury Jets (P) | 22 | 13 | 5 | 4 | 46 | 20 | +26 | 44 | Qualification for Finals series and promotion play-off |
| 3 | Adelaide Olympic | 22 | 14 | 1 | 7 | 42 | 25 | +17 | 43 | Qualification for Finals series and promotion play-off |
| 4 | Fulham United | 22 | 11 | 4 | 7 | 42 | 31 | +11 | 37 | Qualification for Finals series and promotion play-off |
| 5 | Adelaide Blue Eagles | 22 | 10 | 6 | 6 | 36 | 29 | +7 | 36 | Qualification for Finals series and promotion play-off |
| 6 | Adelaide Atletico VSC | 22 | 11 | 3 | 8 | 40 | 34 | +6 | 36 | Qualification for Finals series and promotion play-off |
| 7 | Cumberland United | 22 | 11 | 1 | 10 | 36 | 28 | +8 | 34 | |
| 8 | Cove FC | 22 | 7 | 5 | 10 | 29 | 36 | −7 | 26 | |
| 9 | Eastern United | 22 | 6 | 4 | 12 | 25 | 44 | −19 | 22 | |
| 10 | Adelaide Omonia Cobras | 22 | 6 | 2 | 14 | 22 | 45 | −23 | 20 | |
| 11 | Salisbury United (R) | 22 | 5 | 2 | 15 | 28 | 48 | −20 | 17 | Relegation to SA State League 2 |
| 12 | South Adelaide Panthers (R) | 22 | 4 | 3 | 15 | 26 | 62 | −36 | 15 | Relegation to SA State League 2 |

Source: Dribl
Rules for classification: 1) points; 2) goal difference; 3) number of goals scored; 4) head to head record; 5) playoff match.
(C) Champions; (P) Promoted; (R) Relegated

=== Finals ===
Elimination Finals
4 | Fulham United | 2
5 | Adelaide Blue Eagles | 3
3 | Adelaide Olympic | 3
6 | Adelaide Atletico VSC | 1

Semi-finals
5 | Adelaide Blue Eagles | 0 | 0 | 0
1 | Adelaide Croatia Raiders | 3 | 4 | 7
3 | Adelaide Olympic | 0 | 0 | 0
2 | Modbury Jets | 4 | 6 | 10

Grand Final
1 | Adelaide Croatia Raiders | 4
2 | Modbury Jets | 1

== 2026 State League 2 South Australia ==
SA State League 2
- Season: 2026
- Dates: 13 March–13 September

The 2026 State League 2 South Australia season was the 59th season of third division soccer in South Australia.

=== North ===
==== League table ====
| Pos | Team | Pld | W | D | L | GF | GA | GD | Pts | Qualification |
|---|---|---|---|---|---|---|---|---|---|---|
| 1 | Pontian Eagles (C, P) | 18 | 13 | 2 | 3 | 51 | 19 | +32 | 41 | Qualification for promotion play-offs |
| 2 | Salisbury Inter | 18 | 12 | 3 | 3 | 35 | 20 | +15 | 39 | Qualification for promotion play-offs |
| 3 | Modbury Vista (P) | 18 | 12 | 2 | 4 | 64 | 21 | +43 | 38 | Qualification for promotion play-offs |
| 4 | Elizabeth Downs | 18 | 9 | 4 | 5 | 41 | 31 | +10 | 31 | Qualification for promotion play-offs |
| 5 | Northern Demons | 18 | 8 | 5 | 5 | 34 | 27 | +7 | 29 | |
| 6 | Port Adelaide | 18 | 6 | 4 | 8 | 21 | 35 | −14 | 22 | |
| 7 | Angle Vale | 18 | 5 | 2 | 11 | 22 | 44 | −22 | 17 | |
| 8 | Gawler Eagles | 18 | 4 | 4 | 10 | 23 | 38 | −15 | 16 | |
| 9 | Elizabeth Grove | 18 | 3 | 5 | 10 | 18 | 35 | −17 | 14 | |
| 10 | Barossa United | 18 | 1 | 3 | 14 | 20 | 59 | −39 | 6 | |

Source: Dribl
Rules for classification: 1) points; 2) goal difference; 3) number of goals scored; 4) head to head record; 5) playoff match.
(C) Champions; (P) Promoted

=== South ===
==== League table ====
| Pos | Team | Pld | W | D | L | GF | GA | GD | Pts | Qualification |
|---|---|---|---|---|---|---|---|---|---|---|
| 1 | Vipers FC | 18 | 13 | 1 | 4 | 35 | 19 | +16 | 40 | Qualification for Promotion play-offs |
| 2 | Ghan United | 18 | 13 | 0 | 5 | 44 | 27 | +17 | 39 | Qualification for Promotion play-offs |
| 3 | Seaford Rangers | 18 | 12 | 2 | 4 | 50 | 26 | +24 | 38 | Qualification for Promotion play-offs |
| 4 | Western Strikers | 18 | 12 | 0 | 6 | 59 | 37 | +22 | 36 | Qualification for Promotion play-offs |
| 5 | Adelaide University | 18 | 10 | 3 | 5 | 47 | 22 | +25 | 33 | |
| 6 | Noarlunga United | 18 | 8 | 3 | 7 | 33 | 22 | +11 | 27 | |
| 7 | Adelaide Titans | 18 | 6 | 1 | 11 | 27 | 36 | −9 | 19 | |
| 8 | Adelaide Hills Hawks | 18 | 4 | 0 | 14 | 32 | 48 | −16 | 12 | |
| 9 | Mount Barker United | 18 | 3 | 2 | 13 | 21 | 60 | −39 | 11 | |
| 10 | Plympton Bulldogs | 18 | 3 | 0 | 15 | 20 | 71 | −51 | 9 | |

Source: Dribl
Rules for classification: 1) points; 2) goal difference; 3) number of goals scored; 4) head to head record; 5) playoff match.

=== Promotion play-offs ===
Promotion Play-off
N1 | Pontian Eagles | 1
S1 | Vipers FC | 0
Elimination Finals
N3 | Modbury Vista | 0 | 3 | 3
S3 | Seaford Rangers | 1 | 1 | 2
S4 | Western Strikers | 4 | 2 | 6
N2 | Salisbury Inter | 2 | 1 | 3
N4 | Elizabeth Downs (a.e.t.) | 1 | 5 | 6
S2 | Ghan United | 1 | 4 | 5

Preliminary Finals
S1 | Vipers FC | 0
N3 | Modbury Vista | 2
S4 | Western Strikers | 6
N4 | Elizabeth Downs | 2

Promotion Play-off
N3 | Modbury Vista | 5
S4 | Western Strikers | 1

== 2026 Federation Cup ==
First round Third preliminary round
Elizabeth Grove | 2
Modbury Jets | 6
Messinian Association Hawks | 1
Eastern United | 11
Para Hills East | 2
South Adelaide Panthers | 0
BOSA FC | 0
Adelaide Atletico | 6
Whyalla Lions | 3
Naracoorte United | 1
Adelaide Titans | 0
FK Beograd | 1
Para Hills West (p) | 3 (5)
Adelaide Blue Eagles | 3 (4)
The Cove | 1
Fulham United | 4
Modbury Vista | 2
Adelaide Comets | 5
Adelaide University | 4
Adelaide Brasfoot | 2
International SC | 0
Adelaide Croatia Raiders | 1
Pontian Eagles | 2
West Adelaide Raptors | 1
Old Ignatians | 0
Salisbury United | 3
Cumberland United | 4
Northern Demons | 2
Mount Barker United (a.e.t.) | 4
Angle Vale | 2
Port Adelaide | 3
Sturt Marion Thunder | 1
Noarlunga United (a.e.t.) | 3
Ghan United | 1
Tea Tree Gully | 3
Adelaide Hills Hawks | 2
Blue Lake | 0
Gawler Eagles | 2
Gambier Centrals | 0
Adelaide Olympic | 8
Adelaide City | 3
Seaford Rangers | 0
Vipers FC | 1
Salisbury Inter | 2
Elizabeth Downs | 0
Playford City | 4
Croydon FC | 10
Plympton Bulldogs | 2
Omonia Cobras | 3
Ingle Farm | 0
Barossa United | 1
Western Strikers | 3

Second round Fourth preliminary round
Modbury Jets | 2
Eastern United | 0
Para Hills East | 1
Adelaide Atletico | 3
Whyalla Lions | 1
West Adelaide | 4
Campbelltown City | 2
FK Beograd | 3
Para Hills West | 1
Fulham United | 6
Adelaide Comets | 1
Adelaide University | 0
Adelaide Croatia Raiders | 0
Pontian Eagles | 2
West Torrens Birkalla | 2
Salisbury United | 1
Cumberland United | 5
Mount Barker United | 0
Port Adelaide | 1
Noarlunga United | 2
Tea Tree Gully | 1
Gawler Eagles | 2
Adelaide Olympic | 1
Adelaide City | 4
Salisbury Inter | 0
Para Hills Knights | 3
Playford City | 2
Sturt Lions | 4
Croydon FC | 4
North Eastern MetroStars | 1
Omonia Cobras (a.e.t.) | 7
Western Strikers | 4

Third round Fifth preliminary round
Modbury Jets | 0 (5)
Adelaide Atletico (p) | 0 (6)
West Adelaide | 0
FK Beograd | 3
Fulham United (a.e.t.) | 5
Adelaide Comets | 3
Pontian Eagles | 4
West Torrens Birkalla | 5
Cumberland United | 6
Noarlunga United | 0
Gawler Eagles | 1
Adelaide City | 4
Para Hills Knights | 2
Sturt Lions | 0
Croydon FC | 1
Omonia Cobras | 3

Quarter-finals; Sixth preliminary round
Adelaide Atletico | 0
FK Beograd | 3
Fulham United (a.e.t.) | 3
West Torrens Birkalla | 5
Cumberland United | 1
Adelaide City | 0
Para Hills Knights | 2
Omonia Cobras | 4

Semi-finals; Seventh preliminary round
FK Beograd | 3
West Torrens Birkalla | 0
Cumberland United | 3
Omonia Cobras | 2

Final
FK Beograd (a.e.t.) | 5
Cumberland United | 2

== Final ==
12 July
16:00

| FK Beograd (2) | 5–2 (a.e.t.) | Cumberland United (3) |
|---|---|---|
| Hussein 34'; Nastiopolis 64'; Trimboli 91', 107'; Atkinson 101' | Report | Dutton 12'; LoBasso 60' |

ServiceFM Stadium, Gepps Cross
Referee: Tom Brinkworth
