= Elizabeth Downs =

Elizabeth Downs may refer to:

- Elizabeth Diane Downs (born 1955), American murderer
- Elizabeth Downs, South Australia, northern suburb of Adelaide, South Australia
- Elizabeth Downs SC, a soccer club based in the suburb of Elizabeth Downs
