= Sturt Lions FC =

Sturt Lions
- Full name: Sturt Lions Soccer Club
- Nickname: Lions
- Founded: 2003; 23 years ago
- Ground: Karinya Reserve, Eden Hills
- Chairman: John Van
- Manager: Lino Fusco
- League: NPL South Australia
- 2026: 9th of 12
- Website: http://www.sturtlions.com.au/
Home colours	Away colours

Sturt Lions Soccer Club is an Australian professional football club in Adelaide, South Australia. Nicknamed the Lions, Sturt are associated with FFSA, and they currently play in NPL SA following promotion from SA State League 1 in 2025.

== History ==
In 2017 the Lions were Champions of State League 1 after defeating White City FC, Adelaide Raiders, South Adelaide and Western Strikers SC in the Final Series. As the Champions, the Lions were promoted to the NPL in 2018.They were again promoted to the NPL in 2021 after winning the state league final through spectacular goals from Gonzalo Rodríguez. Sturt has gone from strength to strength under long term manager Lino Fusco.

In 2020 the Lions were again Champions of State League 1 after defeating South Adelaide over 2 legs before beating White City FC in the Promotion Final. As the Champions, the Lions were promoted to the NPL in 2021.

They were relegated from NPL to State League 1 after the 2023 season.

In 2025 the Lions were Premiers of State League 1 after finishing 1st in the regular season. As premiers, the Lions were promoted to the NPL for 2026.

== Notable players ==
In May 2018, Sturt signed Italian striker Matteo Federici. Federici came through the ranks for Serie A sides US Lecce and Chievo Verona. Federici scored 6 goals in his first 7 appearances for Sturt and his performances have been acclaimed in the local media.

In August 2021, Sturt signed Adelaide United legend Michael Marrone. After amassing more than 250 games in the A-League and making 1 appearance for the Socceroos, Michael returned to the local league with Sturt. After signing on the 3rd of August, Michael scored 7 minutes into his debut on the following weekend.

In June 2019, Sturt Lions signed Argentinian and Italian international player Gonzalo Rodríguez. Previously playing in Europe, Rodríguez played 5 seasons for the club, scoring 63 goals in 104 games. He scored the 2 goals in the 2020 Grand Final against White City FC.

== Honours ==
- SA State League 1 Champions: 2017, 2020, 2025

== Divisional history ==
Season	League											Cup
Season	Division	Pld	W	D	L	GF	GA	+/-	Pts	Position	Finals	Cup
2011	SA Div 3	18	3	4	11	19	55	-36	13	8th	DNQ	
2012	SA Div 3	18	2	1	15	15	60	-45	7	10th (P)	DNQ	
2013	SA Div 2	30	1	3	26	34	96	-62	6	16th	DNQ	Federation Cup; Round of 32
2014	SA Div 2	28	8	5	15	32	51	-19	29	11th	DNQ	Federation Cup; Round of 32
2015	SA Div 2	30	12	8	10	62	46	+16	44	9th	DNQ	Federation Cup; Quarter-Finals
2016	SA Div 2	22	12	3	7	41	27	+14	39	4th	Preliminary final	Federation Cup; Round of 32
2017	SA Div 2	22	11	2	9	36	30	+6	35	4th	Champion (P)	Federation Cup; Round of 32
2018	SA Div 1	22	5	4	13	24	48	-24	19	11th (R)	DNQ	Federation Cup; Round of 32
2019	SA Div 2	22	12	7	3	41	21	+20	43	2nd	Preliminary final	Federation Cup; Round of 32
2020	SA Div 2	22	13	6	3	48	18	+30	45	2nd	Champion (P)	—N/a
2021	SA Div 1	22	9	6	7	34	34	0	33	5th	Preliminary final	Federation Cup; Quarter-Finals
2022	SA Div 1	22	7	4	11	29	44	-15	25	8th	DNQ	Federation Cup; Round of 32
2023	SA Div 1	22	3	7	12	24	47	-23	16	11th (R)	DNQ	Federation Cup; Round of 16
2024	SA Div 2	22	10	2	10	33	42	-9	32	8th	DNQ	Federation Cup; Round of 32
2025	SA Div 2	22	19	1	2	58	18	+40	58	1st (P)	Runners-up	Federation Cup; Round of 16
2026	SA Div 1											
