= Pontian Eagles SC =

Soccer club based in Adelaide, South Australia

Pontian Eagles
- Full name: Pontian Eagles Sports and Social Club
- Founded: 1992; 34 years ago
- Ground: Terry Kalaitsidis Park
- League: SA State League 1
- 2026: SA State League 2 North; 1st of 10 (premiers, promoted)

Pontian Eagles Soccer Club is a semi-professional soccer club based in Paralowie, a suburb in the north of Adelaide. The club was founded in 1992, and currently compete in State League 1 South Australia in the third tier of Australian soccer.

== History ==
Pontian Eagles Soccer Club was founded in 1992 by a group of Pontic Greek immigrants. From its founding until 2019, the club competed in the South Australian Amateur Soccer League.

Pontian Eagles joined State League Two for the 2020 season, replacing UniSA FC. Pontian previously attempted to join the competition in 2016, but withdrew as it had only just moved to their new facility at Yalumba Drive Reserve and would have been unable to financially handle the move.

Pontian Eagles won promotion to State League One in 2024, finishing top of the ladder in their fifth season in the competition. The next season, they were relegated straight back down to State League Two after finishing bottom of the ladder with just two wins all season. On 5 October 2025, the club's long-time president Terry Kalaitsidis died aged 61. In their first season back in State League Two, Pontian won the north conference premiership. Two weeks later, they were crowned champions and were promoted back to State League One after a 1–0 over Vipers FC in front of 1,800 spectators at ServiceFM Stadium.

== Honours ==
- SA State League 2 Champions
  - Winners (1): 2026
- SA State League 2 Premiers
  - Winners (2): 2024, 2026

== See also ==
- Pontic eagle
