= Elizabeth Downs SC =

Soccer club based in Adelaide, South Australia

Elizabeth Downs
- Full name: Elizabeth Downs Soccer Club
- Founded: 1962; 64 years ago
- Ground: Argana Park
- League: SA State League 2 North
- 2026: 4th of 10

Elizabeth Downs Soccer Club is a semi-professional soccer club based in Elizabeth Downs, a suburb in the north of Adelaide. The club was founded in 1962, and currently compete in State League 2 South Australia in the fourth tier of Australian soccer.

== History ==
Elizabeth Downs Junior Soccer Club was founded in 1962 by a group of parents led by Sid Goode and Hughie Ross, initially competing in the Elizabeth and Districts Junior Soccer Association. The club fielded senior teams in the South Australian Amateur Soccer League for the first time in 1971. During its time in the amateur league, the club won ten first division titles and five SAASL Cups.

In December 2014, the club's former chairman William Duncan was found guilty of theft and dishonest dealings after he stole more than $14,000 from the club in 2011 while he was acting treasurer, which almost caused the club to fold. He was handed a 12-month suspended sentence and was ordered to repay the money.

In 2018, the club competed in the Football SA Federation Cup, jointly contested as the FFA Cup preliminary rounds, for the first time since 2006, after the South Australian Amateur League voted in favour of reaffiliating with Football South Australia. In 2019, the club went on a historic run in the competition, defeating State League Two side Vipers FC in the third round, and National Premier Leagues SA club MetroStars on penalties in the quarter-finals, which was described as one of the biggest upsets in state soccer history. The club was drawn against 17-time cup winners Adelaide City in the semi-finals, and were ultimately defeated 1–2 in front of 2,268 spectators.

Elizabeth Downs joined State League Two for the 2026 season as part of Football South Australia's expansion of the division. Downs first expressed interest in joining the competition in 2024, but postponed its application to ensure the club was best positioned prior to entry.
