= Eastern United FC =

Soccer club based in Adelaide, South Australia

Eastern United
- Full name: Eastern United Football Club
- Nickname: The Saints
- Founded: 2013; 13 years ago
- Ground: Athelstone Recreation Reserve
- League: SA State League 1
- 2026: 9th of 12
- Website: easternunitedfc.com.au

Eastern United Football Club is a semi-professional soccer club based in Athelstone, a suburb in the north-east of Adelaide. The club was founded in 2013, and currently compete in State League 1 South Australia in the third tier of Australian soccer.

== History ==
Eastern United Football Club was founded in 2013, taking N.A.B. SC's place in the South Australian State League.

In June 2015, head coach Diego Pellegrini was handed a 12-month ban by Football Federation South Australia for entering the field of play and participating in a brawl during a match against Adelaide Cobras. The club was also fined $3,000 for the incident. In August 2016, Pellegrini was given a 12-week ban, in addition to a six-month ban that had been suspended for a previous incident, for violent conduct against an opposing player after he was sent off during a match against Fulham United.

In 2015, the club was relegated to the newly-created State League Two competition. After five seasons in the third tier, Eastern United won promotion back to State League One after being crowned 2020 State League Two champions.

Eastern United suffered relegation back down to State League Two in 2023.

In 2025, the club won the State League Two South premiership and went on to win promotion after defeating Modbury Vista in the championship final in front of 1,412 spectators at ServiceFM Stadium.

In July 2026, Eastern United were fined $2,500 after a brawl broke out at the end of a match against Adelaide Blue Eagles.

== Honours ==
- SA State League 2 Champions
  - Winners (2): 2020, 2025
- SA State League 2 Premiers
  - Winners (1): 2025
  - Runners-up (1): 2020
