= The Cove FC =

Soccer club based in Adelaide, South Australia

The Cove
- Full name: The Cove Football Club
- Founded: 1983; 43 years ago
- Ground: Southern Soccer Facility
- League: SA State League 1
- 2026: 8th of 12
Home colours	Away colours

The Cove Football Club is a semi-professional soccer club based in Trott Park, a suburb in the south of Adelaide. The club was founded in 1983, and currently compete in State League 1 South Australia in the third tier of Australian soccer.

== History ==
The Cove Football Club was founded in 1983 by Richard Parker. From its founding until 2008, the club competed in the South Australian Amateur Soccer League, winning two league titles in 1991 and 2001.

The Cove joined the FFSA State League in 2009, with the growth in population in the region cited as a determining factor for their inclusion. Following the restructuring of South Australian competitions in 2013, the club were one of 16 competing in the State League South Australia, achieving their best result in 2015, when they finished 4th. The club were relegated to State League Two in 2018.

The club moved to the newly completed Southern Soccer Facility in April 2022.

In the 2024 season, Cove finished second on the ladder, three points behind premiers Pontian Eagles. They would go on to win promotion back to State League One after defeating Modbury Vista 3–1 in the Grand Final at ServiceFM Stadium.

In November 2026, players from the club were investigated by Football Australia for alleged match fixing. Reports allege that a handful of senior players engaged in competition manipulation and illegal gambling on their own games during the 2026 season. Chairman Phil Hole clarified in a statement that the club itself was not under investigation and has been fully cooperative with Football Australia and South Australia Police.

== Honours ==
- SA State League 2 Champions
  - Winners (1): 2024
- SA State League 2 Premiers
  - Runners-up (1): 2024
