= State Centre for Football =

Soccer facility in Adelaide, South Australia, Australia

Coordinates: 34.8397°S 138.6188°E

State Centre for Football Service FM Stadium
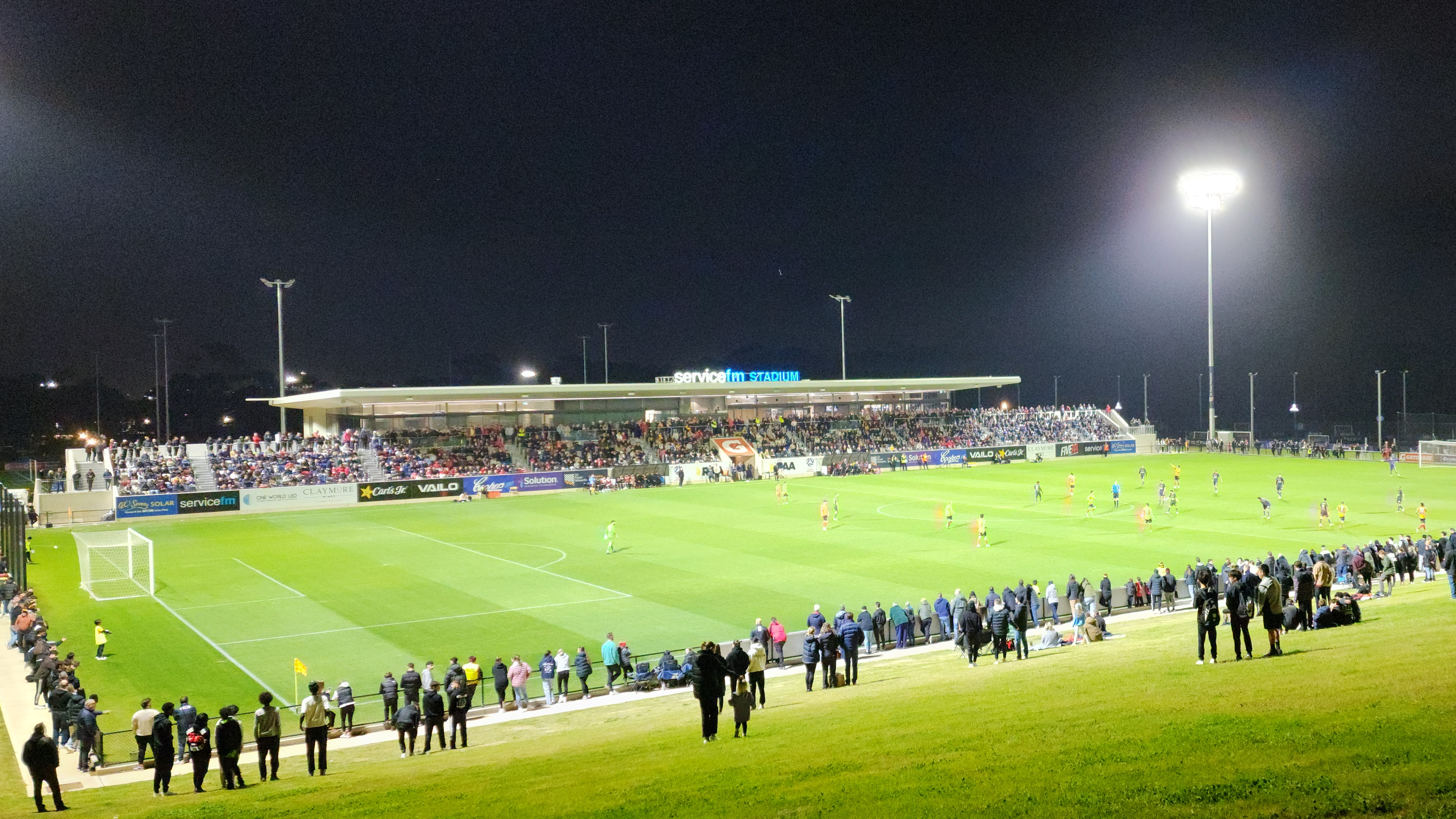
- ServiceFM Stadium during the 2024 NPL SA Grand Final
- Interactive map of State Centre for Football; Service FM Stadium
- Address: Matildas Dr, Cnr Briens Rd; Adelaide, South Australia; Australia
- Location: State Sports Park, Gepps Cross
- Owner: Football South Australia
- Capacity: 7,000 (1,000 seated)
- Surface: Grass
- Scoreboard: One World LED, Sportal
- Record attendance: 3,327 (Adelaide City vs Adelaide United, 2022 Australia Cup)

Construction
- Groundbreaking: 16 March 2021
- Built: April 2022
- Opened: 16 July 2022
- Cost: $24 million
- Architect: Greenway Architects
- Builder: Built Environs

Tenants
- Current; Adelaide United Women (ALW) (2022–); Adelaide United Youth (NPLSA) (2022–); Previous; Adelaide Comets (NPLSA) (2022–2024)

The State Centre for Football, known as ServiceFM Stadium for sponsorship reasons, is a soccer facility in Gepps Cross, an inner northern suburb of Adelaide, South Australia.

The facility consists of two artificial pitches, and the main pitch, which has a seated capacity of 1,000, and a total capacity of 7,000. The stadium hosts many South Australian NPL games, Australia Cup, and African Nations Cup games. The ground is used by Football South Australia as a neutral venue for major matches, as well as being a temporary home ground for various clubs and Adelaide United's Women's team.

== History ==
Design of the stadium was by Greenway Architects, and it was built by Built Environs. The cost of construction was A$24 million.

The State Centre for Football first broke ground on 16 March 2021, two years after plans were initially revealed. The project was backed by the state and federal Labor government, after a $19 million grant and $7.4 million grant from them respectively.

The State Centre for Football was completed in mid-April 2022. The first competitive game was held on 23 April, a game between Adelaide Comets and FK Beograd, a match that Comets won 2–1.

The venue was officially opened on 16 July 2022 before the 2022 Federation Cup Final by the Minister for Recreation, Sport and Racing, Katrine Hildyard. It was also announced that facilities manager ServiceFM had acquired naming rights for the complex until 2026.

In November of the same year, the RAA African Nations Cup was held at the stadium for the first time, and the tournament returned in November 2023.

The venue was utilised as a training base during the 2023 FIFA Women's World Cup, alongside the Marden Sports Complex.

== Description ==
The stadium is located at State Sports Park in the northern Adelaide suburb of Gepps Cross, on Matildas Drive, which was named after the women's national team, nicknamed The Matildas. The road is maintained by the City of Port Adelaide Enfield.

It can hold up to 7,000 spectators, with 1,000 seated, Its scoreboard is a One World LED product.

== Australia Cup ==
The venue has hosted multiple Australia Cup fixtures. The stadium's all-time attendance record of 3,327 was set during the Round of 16 match between Adelaide City and Adelaide United, the first competitive meeting between the two teams.

Date	Time	Home team	Result	Away team	Round	Attendance
Wednesday, 10 August 2022	19:00 (ACST)	Modbury Jets	0–4	Macarthur FC	Round of 16	1,080
Wednesday, 17 August 2022	19:00 (ACST)	Adelaide City	2–2 (a.e.t.) (1–4 pen.)	Adelaide United	Round of 16	3,327
Wednesday, 31 August 2022	19:00 (ACST)	Adelaide United	1–2	Brisbane Roar	Quarter-final	2,511
Thursday, 12 September 2024	19:00 (ACST)	Adelaide United	2–1 (a.e.t.)	Western Sydney Wanderers	Quarter-final	2,906
