= Fulham United FC =

- Full name: Fulham United Football Club
- Nicknames: Black and Whites
- Founded: 11 June 1969; 57 years ago
- Ground: West Beach Parks Football Centre
- Capacity: 2,000
- Manager: Tony Galanopoulos
- League: SA State League 1
- 2026: 4th of 12
- Website: fulhamunited.com.au
Home colours	Away colours

Fulham United Football Club is a semi-professional soccer club based in West Beach, a seaside western suburb of Adelaide. The club was founded on 11 June 1969, breaking away from West Beach Soccer Club. Initially playing in the South Australian Amateur Soccer League, the club joined the Federation ahead of the 2016 season. The club currently plays in State League 1 South Australia, winning promotion to the third tier of Australian soccer in 2017. Originally playing at Barret Reserve, the club moved to Collins Reserve in 1979 in Kidman Park, and has been based out of their current home ground, West Beach Parks Football Centre, since 2018.

== Seasons ==
Season	League											State Cup	
Season	Division (Tier)	Pld	W	D	L	GF	GA	GD	Pts	Pos	Finals	State Cup	
2016	SL2 (4)	16	6	6	4	28	22	+6	24	5th	—	Federation	R3
2017	SL2 (4)	22	15	3	4	77	27	+50	48	3rd	RU	Federation	R2
2018	SL1 (3)	22	6	4	12	31	44	−13	22	10th	—	Federation	R1
2019	SL1 (3)	22	9	4	9	35	34	+1	31	7th	—	Federation	R1
2020	SL1 (3)	22	6	4	12	31	38	−7	22	9th	—	—	
2021	SL1 (3)	22	8	2	12	23	35	−12	26	7th	—	Federation	R3
2022	SL1 (3)	22	9	6	7	30	28	+2	33	6th	SF	Federation	R1
2023	SL1 (3)	22	9	2	11	32	36	–4	29	9th	—	Federation	R1
