= Adelaide Omonia Cobras FC =

Australian football club

Adelaide Omonia Cobras
- Full name: Adelaide Omonia Cobras Football Club
- Nickname: The Cobras
- Founded: 1972; 54 years ago
- Ground: Weigall Oval
- Capacity: 5,000
- Chairman: Simon Panayi
- Manager: Josh Smith & Zep Barca
- League: SA State League 1
- 2026: 10th of 12
- Website: https://adelaidecobras.com.au/
Home colours	Away colours

Adelaide Omonia Cobras FC is an Australian football (soccer) club from Adelaide, South Australia. The Cobras currently play in the South Australian State League 1, and play home games at Weigall Oval in Adelaide's western suburb of Plympton.

== History ==
The Adelaide Omonia Football Club was founded in 1972 by the local Cypriot Australian community. The original concept behind the creation of the club was to give young migrants an outlet to socialise rather than spend their time in the coffee shops and gambling spots of Adelaide. The club name Adelaide Omonia was to signify the City of Adelaide and "Omonia" meaning unity with Adelaide and its surrounding communities and suburbs.

The club was registered and competed in the South Australian Amateur League's Division 4 in 1973. After winning the Division 4 championship in 1974, the club was promoted to Division 3. By 1981 the club was competing in the South Australian Amateur League's Division 1 and was one of the more competitive teams through the 1980s.

By 1988, the club was looking for a broader challenge. The Adelaide Omonia Football Club had established a successful junior program, and so to give these juniors a path to play in the top level within South Australia, applied for and succeeded in gaining entry into the South Australian Football Federation's State League. Over the years the club has established itself as a stable and competitive club, respected within the South Australian Football Federation and the broader soccer community.

In 1994, the club was looking to widen its appeal outside of the Cyprus community and changed their name to the Adelaide Cobras Football Club. In 1998, the Adelaide Cobras played off in a preliminary final at Hindmarsh stadium after finishing 4th in the 2nd division that year under former NSL player/coach Raymond Blair. In 2004, under coach and former NSL player Nick Pantsaras, the Cobras sat on top of Division 2 for the best part of the season but were pipped for the title on the last day of the season.

In 2006, the SASF introduced a Third Division and the Cobras competed in this league after finishing in the lower half of Division 2 in 2005. The 2006 was a great success for the club with completing a treble of titles in the seniors, reserves and under 18s who all finished top of their respective leagues. Club stalwart and former player John Harpas coached the seniors to the title, which saw the club promoted back to Division 2. In 2009, the Adelaide Cobras finally got promoted to the top tier of FFSA by finishing minor premiers. In 2010, the club played in the NPL for the first time and was relegated back to the 2nd division.

After consolidating for two seasons, the Cobras challenged the Division 2 title under coach Maged Ibrahim. A 2nd place finish saw the Cobras promoted back to the NPL in 2013. The 2013 season in the top flight again proved difficult, with the club finishing 2nd bottom and relegated back to the Division 2. In 2014 and 2015, the Cobras competed in the Division 2, before the FFSA once again decided to introduce a third division named the State League 2. An eleventh place finish in 2015 saw the Cobras placed in the State League 2 for 2016. The Cobras were going close to promotion to State League 1 in 2017, 2018 and 2019, but falling short in several play off finals.

In 2020, the Cobras under coaches John Falidis and Zep Barca, were finally successful in gaining promotion to the State League 1 after finishing minor premiers and finishing on top of the ladder. In an exciting last game in round 22, the Cobras defeated close rivals Modbury Vista 1-0 at Jack Smith Park to clinch promotion and top position in the league standings. A couple of semi-final wins against Eastern United saw the team qualify for the Grand Final at The Parks, again having to face Eastern United. In a tough encounter the game went into extra time, but ultimately ended in a 1-0 loss. In the 2021 State League 1 season, the Cobras were relegated by goal difference after finishing 11th. The 2022 State League 2 season saw the Cobras dominate the league, finishing top by 8 points and clinching the Premiers trophy and automatic promotion back to SL1. The under 18s also clinched the Premiership and Championship double by going undefeated for the entire season. In 2023, the Cobras finished in 4th place on the SL1 ladder and competed in the final series.

== Club honours ==
=== Domestic tournaments ===
- U18 State League Champions: 1994
- State League Champions: 2006
- State League Reserves Champions: 2006
- State League U18 Champions: 2006
- FFSA Premier League Premiers: 2009
- FFSA Premier League runners-up: 2012
- FFSA State League Reserves champions: 2016
- FSA State League 2 Premiers: 2020
- FSA State League 2 Premiers: 2022
- FSA U18 State League 2 Premiers: 2022
- FSA U18 State League 2 champions: 2022
