= South Adelaide Panthers FC =

South Adelaide Panthers
- Full name: South Adelaide Panthers FC
- Nickname: Panthers
- Founded: 1998 as Panthers; 2006 as South Adelaide Panthers
- Ground: O'Sullivan Beach Sports Complex
- Chairman: Ainsley Roscrow
- Manager: Dave Myers
- League: SA State League 1
- 2026: 12th of 12, (relegated)
- Website: http://www.sapanthersfc.com.au/
Home colours	Away colours

South Adelaide Panthers Football Club are a soccer club from the southern suburbs of Adelaide, South Australia. They play in the National Premier League NPL South Australia, with a home ground at the O'Sullivan Beach Sports Complex, also known as Panther Park. Panthers also field senior female teams in the Women's State League.

== History ==
The club was founded in August 1997 to provide opportunities for the advancement to senior level for players associated with the South Adelaide Colts Club. The club was originally an attempt to use and dominate the south as Noarlunga United and Seaford had limited success despite good youth talent in the area. although they were initially successful many player disputes with management led to much of the youth talent obtained leaving before playing much first team football for the club. The Panthers F.C. as they are affectionately known are the hated rivals of Noarlunga United as a result of player movements, transfer politics and club proximity.

When the club was formed it was jointly owned by the Sporting Star and South Adelaide Colts. The club's initial games were played at the Cove Sports Community Centre – a ground known for its heavy winds.

The Panthers have fielded young teams in the SASF 2nd Division. After initially struggling the Panthers have steadily improved to become a regular mid-table side in the 2nd Division. The Panthers were then coached by Aldo Maricic.

In 2008 the club planned a tournament to mark the passing of Tony Macentagert a club president at the time which they named after him inviting local teams from the area. Included were Seaford Rangers F.C., Noarlunga United F.C. and Hallett Cove F.C.(amateur club). South Adelaide beat Noarlunga on penalties in the inaugural tournament and hope to make it an annual event.

After gaining promotion to the South Australian National Premier League in 2013 for the first time in the club's history, the senior men's side became the first club from the south of the Adelaide region to compete in the top South Australian division.

The club is currently managed by Andrew Calderbank and plays in the 2020 State League One Competition.

=== Current squad ===
As of 6 March 2024

Note: Flags indicate national team as defined under FIFA eligibility rules; some limited exceptions apply. Players may hold more than one non-FIFA nationality.

No.	Pos.	Nation	Player
1	GK	AUS	Lewis Moss
2	DF	AUS	Michael Goode
4	DF	AUS	Robert Parker
5	DF	AUS	Caden Yates
6	DF	AUS	Chol Wel
7	FW	AUS	Tyreece Conway
8	MF	AUS	Daniel Evans
10	FW	AUS	Jonathon Rideout
11	FW	AUS	Alexander Rideout
13		AUS	Jai Conroy
14	FW	AUS	Donovan Pollock
15	MF	JPN	Akira Kobaishi

No.	Pos.	Nation	Player
16		AUS	Wesley Weetra
17		AUS	Connor Higgins
18		AUS	Jasper Hurrell
19	DF	AUS	Mitchell Sumnall
20		AUS	Mitchell Betterman
21		AUS	Mason Cahill
23	DF	KOR	Byungtae Ahn
25	GK	AUS	Jude Yeomans
—		AUS	Blake Carnie
—		AUS	Nicholas Horsbrugh
—	FW	AUS	Nick Samaras
—	FW	AUS	Clement Ebahece Waoci

Managerial history

Name	Period
R.Blair	1999–2000
G.Price	2001
P.Rideout	2002
A.Maricic	2003–2004
T.Hayes	2005–2007
Maricic	2008–2009
S.Maxwell	2010
S.Kitchin	2011–2013
D.Graystone	2014–2017
B.Dale	2018–2019

== Pink Panthers history ==
On 23 September 2012 Tegan Wilkinson played her 100th Senior Women's Game for the South Adelaide Pink Panthers, being the club's first female player to achieve this milestone. Tegan has played every year since the start in 2005. On 9 August 2015 Jess Kirk became the second female to play 100 Senior Women's Games for the Club, marking the occasion with a well-taken winning goal against previously undefeated Salisbury Inter.

== Club honours ==
- 2017 State League 1 League Champions

== Notable former players ==
- Fabian Barbiero
- Stephen Hoyle

== Affiliated clubs ==
- Cardijn Old Collegians Football Club
