= FK Beograd (Australia) =

- Full name: Beograd Woodville Sports And Social Club Inc
- Nicknames: Beograd, Warriors
- Short name: FKB
- Founded: 1949 as Beograd; 1993 as White City Woodville; 2022 as FK Beograd
- Ground: 1Solution Frank Mitchell Park
- Capacity: 2,500
- Chairman: Andrew Popovich
- Manager: Daniel Mullen
- League: NPL South Australia
- 2026: 5th of 12
- Website: https://www.fkbeograd.com.au/
Home colours	Away colours

FK Beograd (Serbian Cyrillic: ФК Београд), formerly known as White City Woodville, is an Australian semi-professional soccer club based in Woodville, Adelaide, South Australia. Founded in 1949 by the Serbian Australian community, the club currently competes in the South Australian National Premier League. They are currently coached by Daniel Mullen and his assistant John Falidis.

== History ==
The Beograd Sports and Social club was formed on 19 November 1949 and a meeting arranged at the railway lawns, North Terrace, Adelaide. The first Committee was: President Ilija Ilić, Vice President Miodrag Zivković, Secretary Danilo Ćukić, Treasurer Â Nikola Kleut and committee members Dušan Naumović, Vaso Keković, Stanoje Vuković and Peter Nikolich.

Beograd played its first league game on 15 April 1950 at its home ground in the South Parklands against Prospect, winning the game 5–2. Beograd moved to its current home of Frank Mitchell Park in 1956. In 2006, the club celebrated its 50th anniversary.

In 1979 Beograd won the State League First Division Championship for the first time. This milestone also coincides with the year Beograd changed its playing colours from blue, white and red to the Serbian colours of Red, blue and white. In addition, flood lights were also installed in 1979 by Branko Petakovic and the president was Milan Stepanovic.

In 1992 Beograd changed its name to White City Woodville. The name of the ground at Woodville West was changed to Frank Mitchell Park in honour of the club's servant who devoted many years of his life to the White City and its juniors.

In 2021 after spending 5 years in state league one, FK Beograd achieved promotion under Damien Mori to the National Premier League after beating Birkalla 2-1 at the Parks Stadium.

In 2022 the club changed its name to FK Beograd.

== Current squad ==
As of 11 April 2026

Note: Flags indicate national team as defined under FIFA eligibility rules; some limited exceptions apply. Players may hold more than one non-FIFA nationality.

No.	Pos.	Nation	Player
1	GK	AUS	Alexander Woodlands
13	GK	AUS	Alex Rusmir
2	DF	AUS	Massimo Falco
3	DF	ITA	Marco Torriani
4	MF	AUS	Jordan Leane
5	DF	AUS	Cooper Nunn
7	MF	ITA	Lorenzo Boselli
8	FW	AUS	Jason Konstandopolous
9	FW	AUS	Abu-Bakari Hussein
10	FW	AUS	Antoni Trimboli

No.	Pos.	Nation	Player
14	FW	NZL	Daniel Atkinson
15	DF	AUS	Ethan Harrington
17	MF	AUS	Brandon Centofanti
19	FW	AUS	Zak Cosic
22	MF	AUS	Froribert Niyonkuru
23	DF	AUS	Markus Orchard
24	FW	AUS	Peter Palasis

== Honours ==
- South Australian First Division Championship
  - Winners (3): 1979, 1983, 1993
  - Runners-up (2): 1977, 1996
- South Australian First Division Premiership
  - Winners (1): 1996
- South Australian Second Division Championship
  - Winners (6): 1955, 1967, 1971, 1989, 1994, 2021
  - Runners-up (1): 1970
- South Australian Second Division Premiership
  - Winners (1): 1994
  - Runners-up (1): 2009
- Federation Cup
  - Winners (6): 1980, 1983, 1993, 1996, 2005, 2026
  - Runner-up (2): 1952, 2013
- First Division Cup
  - Runner-up (2): 1951, 1953
- Second Division Cup
  - Winner (1): 1955
  - Runners-up (1): 1971
- Top Four Cup
  - Winners (1): 1979
  - Runners-up (3): 1982, 1985, 1986
- Night Series
  - Winners (1): 1980
  - Runners-up (2): 1986, 2004
- Pre-Season Cup
  - Winners (1): 1957
- Premier Cup
  - Winners (1): 1986
