= Vipers FC =

- Full name: Vipers Football Club
- Nickname: Vipers
- Founded: 2006; 20 years ago
- Ground: St Clair Oval, Woodville
- Capacity: 1,000
- Chairman: Adrian Moore
- Manager: Dimi Pana
- League: SA State League 2
- 2025: SA State League 1, 11th of 12 (relegated)
- Website: http://vipersfc.com.au/
Home colours

Vipers FC is a football club based in St Clair, South Australia. They will play in the South Australian State League 1 competition in 2023.

Their home ground is St Clair Oval where they host training sessions and soccer games.

== History ==
Vipers FC were founded in 2006. In 2007, the Vipers FC started in Division 4 Saturday which was a single team competition. During the following year, 2008, the club grew to two teams that qualified for Division 3. Division 3 saw the club finish third and, due to a team leaving the competition above, saw the Vipers get promoted to Division 2. In 2009 Division 2, the club grew to 3 teams and had one of its most successful seasons finishing second by a point and gaining automatic promotion to Saturday Premier division. In 2010, the club was in Saturday amateur's Premier division with the club growing to 4 senior teams. Unfortunately in 2010, the club finished last on the table and was relegated back to Division 2. The 2011 season saw the Vipers in a rebuilding phase and turned their focus on competing successfully in Division 2 as well as begin to focus on junior development within the club. In 2011, the club fielded only 3 senior teams with all grades finishing mid table. In 2012, the club remained in Division 2 with 3 senior teams but expanded to include 3 junior teams and a little junior development academy. In 2015, the club decided to leave the SAASL competitions and decided to affiliate with the FFSA.

In 2016, the club finished 6th on the South Australian State League 2.

In 2019, Vipers finished 4th and were promoted to the South Australian State League 1.

In 2020, After a poor season led by then Manager Andrew Burgess they were relegated back to South Australian State League 2 after finishing 11th.

Vipers FC appointed manager Maged Ibrahim and finished the 2021 season in 4th place. The team stormed its way to the 2021 State League Two Grand Final but fell to Adelaide University on penalties.

2022 saw Vipers FC build on what the new coaches implemented the previous season. The team finished in second place and defeated the top ranked Cobras on aggregate 6-2 in the semi-final to face Western Strikers in the State League 2 Grand Final and be awarded Champions of State League Two and gain promotion to the next division. In perhaps the most famous game of the club's history up to that point, Vipers FC found themselves down 1-3 early in the second half but showed true determination and togetherness to fight back. Vipers FC number 9 Alexi Georgakopoulos volleyed home a second goal for the team before they forced an own goal in the 92nd minute to send the game to Extra Time. After the restart, it was the Vipers who were controlling the play and they soon found the back of the net through an extraordinary goal from a corner kick by star winger Matheus Rodrigues. After going 4-3 up the Vipers continued to hold their ground and the Strikers lost their composure with two players being red carded in Extra Time.

Vipers FC's 4-3 win over Western Strikers marked their return to State League One after facing relegation in 2020, erasing the heartache of their 2021 Grand Final loss to Adelaide University.

Coach Maged Ibrahim was awarded the State League Two Coach of the Year at the Football South Australia 2022 award ceremony.
