= 2023 FSA Federation Cup =

2023 Australia Cup South Australian preliminary rounds

Tournament details
- Country: Australia
- Dates: 10 February–24 June
- Teams: 46

Final positions
- Champions: North Eastern MetroStars (6th title)
- Runners-up: Campbelltown City
- Australia Cup: Campbelltown City; North Eastern MetroStars

Tournament statistics
- Matches played: 45
- Goals scored: 196 (4.36 per match)
- Top goal scorer(s): Michael Cittadinni (6 goals)

The 2023 Football South Australia Federation Cup, also known as the Australia Cup South Australian preliminary rounds until the semi-finals, was the 110th running of the Federation Cup, the main soccer knockout cup competition in South Australia. The competition also functioned as part of the 2023 Australia Cup preliminary rounds, with the two finalists qualifying for the main knockout competition.

North Eastern MetroStars were champions for the sixth time, defeating Campbelltown City 3–2 after extra time in the final. Adelaide City were the defending champions, losing 1–0 in the quarter-finals to Campbelltown City.

== Schedule ==
Round	Draw date	Match dates	No. of fixtures	Teams	New entries this round
First round	20 January	10–12 February	14	46 → 32	28
Second round	20 February	16–19 March	16	32 → 16	17
Third round	22 March	14–16 April	8	16 → 8	None
Quarter-finals	17 April	9–16 May	4	8 → 4	None
Semi-finals	19 May	31 May–7 June	2	4 → 2	None
Final	—	24 June	1	2 → 1	None

== Teams ==
Location of teams participating in the Federation Cup

A total of 46 teams participated in the competition, 41 from the Greater Adelaide area, two from the Adelaide Hills region, and one from Gawler, the Limestone Coast and Port Pirie. National Premier Leagues South Australia, State League One and State League Two represent levels 2–4 on the unofficial Australian league system, and are required to participate in the Federation Cup. The South Australian Regional Leagues represent level 5. The South Australian Amateur Soccer League is not represented on the national league system. Adelaide United Youth are not eligible for the tournament, as the senior team entered the Australia Cup competition at the Round of 32.

National Premier League (2) Adelaide City Adelaide Comets Adelaide Olympic Campbelltown City Croydon FC FK Beograd Modbury Jets North Eastern MetroStars South Adelaide Panthers Sturt Lions West Adelaide	State League One (3) Adelaide Blue Eagles Adelaide Cobras Adelaide Croatia Raiders Adelaide Victory Cumberland United Eastern United Fulham United Para Hills Knights Playford City Patriots Port Adelaide Pirates Vipers FC West Torrens Birkalla	State League Two (4) Adelaide Hills Hawks Adelaide University Gawler Eagles Modbury Vista Mount Barker United Noarlunga United Northern Demons Pontian Eagles Salisbury United Seaford Rangers The Cove Western Strikers	Regional Leagues (5) Collegiate Adelaide University Grads Blue Pembroke Old Scholars Rostrevor Old Collegians Limestone Coast Naracoorte United	Amateur League (-) Elizabeth Downs Elizabeth Grove Ghan United Para Hills East Para Hills West Pitbulls FC Tea Tree Gully City

== Bracket ==
First round Third preliminary round
Adelaide Uni Grads Blue	2
Pembroke Old Scholars	0
Playford City Patriots	1
Adelaide Victory	0
The Cove	2
Northern Demons	3
Pitbulls FC	0
Modbury Vista	4
Ghan United	5
Para Hills Knights	3
Port Adelaide Pirates	1
Vipers FC	2
Mount Barker United	1
Adelaide University	2
Gawler Eagles	0
West Torrens Birkalla	4
Seaford Rangers (p)	1 (5)
Fulham United	1 (4)
Para Hills East	0
Eastern United	3
Adelaide Blue Eagles	2
Adelaide Hills Hawks	1
Cumberland United	7
Para Hills West	0
Rostrevor Old Collegians	1
Western Strikers	2
Naracoorte United	0
Adelaide Cobras	5

Second round Fourth preliminary round
Campbelltown City	6
Adelaide Uni Grads Blue	0
Playford City Patriots	3
South Adelaide Panthers	1
Adelaide City	7
Pontian Eagles	0
Northern Demons	2
Adelaide Olympic	3
Modbury Vista	2
Ghan United	6
Vipers FC	0
Adelaide University	1
Croydon FC	7
Tea Tree Gully City	1
Sturt Lions	6
Salisbury United	1
West Adelaide	4
West Torrens Birkalla	5
Seaford Rangers	1
Noarlunga United (a.e.t.)	2
Eastern United	2
Elizabeth Grove	1
Adelaide Blue Eagles	1
Modbury Jets	3
Adelaide Croatia Raiders	0
Adelaide Comets	3
Cumberland United	0
North Eastern MetroStars	4
Western Strikers	0
FK Beograd	7
Elizabeth Downs	4
Adelaide Cobras (a.e.t.)	5

Third round Fifth preliminary round
Campbelltown City	3
Playford City Patriots	2
Adelaide City	6
Adelaide Olympic	0
Ghan United	2
Adelaide University	3
Croydon FC	3
Sturt Lions	1
West Torrens Birkalla (p)	1 (5)
Noarlunga United	1 (4)
Eastern United (a.e.t.)	1
Modbury Jets	0
Adelaide Comets	1
North Eastern MetroStars	4
FK Beograd	1
Adelaide Cobras	3

Quarter-finals; Sixth preliminary round
Campbelltown City	1
Adelaide City	0
Adelaide University	0
Croydon FC	3
West Torrens Birkalla	2
Eastern United	0
North Eastern MetroStars	4
Adelaide Cobras	2

Semi-finals; Seventh preliminary round
Campbelltown City	1
Croydon FC	0
West Torrens Birkalla	0
North Eastern MetroStars	5

Final
Campbelltown City	2
North Eastern MetroStars (a.e.t.)	3

== First round ==
The first round of the Federation Cup was also the third round of the 2023 Australia Cup preliminary rounds. Seven teams received a bye to the second round: Adelaide Croatia Raiders (3), Elizabeth Downs (-), Elizabeth Grove (-), Noarlunga United (4), Pontian Eagles (4), Salisbury United (4) and Tea Tree Gully City (-). The round included teams from all levels except the National Premier League.

All times are in ACDT

10 February	Pitbulls FC (-)	0–4	Modbury Vista (4)	Brahma Lodge
19:00		Report	Head 63', 81'; Crescenzi 79'; Essex 86'	Stadium: Cockburn Green; Referee: Nick Elagin

10 February	Playford City Patriots (3)	1–0	Adelaide Victory (3)	Edinburgh North
19:00	Herraman 82'	Report		Stadium: Ramsay Park; Referee: Daniel Faulkner

10 February	Seaford Rangers (4)	1–1 (a.e.t.) (5–4 p)	Fulham United (3)	Port Noarlunga South
19:00	Aplin 76'	Report	Bouzalas 2' (pen.)	Stadium: Karingal Reserve; Referee: Joe-Jordan Tripodi

10 February	Gawler Eagles (4)	0–4	West Torrens Birkalla (3)	Evanston Gardens
20:00		Report	Stevenson 15'; Ture 36' (pen.); Ahmad 48'; Scambiatterra 71'	Stadium: Karbeethan Reserve; Referee: David Alberton

11 February	Adelaide University Grads Blue (5)	2–0	Pembroke Old Scholars (5)	North Adelaide
11:00	Tse 54'; Tesfa 77'	Report		Stadium: University Oval; Referee: Dion Turner

11 February	Naracoorte United (5)	0–5	Adelaide Cobras (3)	Naracoorte
15:00		Report	Acton 23'; Mitris 33', 51' (pen.), 62'; Ditroia 84'	Stadium: Naracoorte Sports Centre; Referee: Leigh Prior

11 February	The Cove (4)	2–3	Northern Demons (4)	Trott Park
15:30	Visser 7'; Thornton 62'	Report	Nestoras 37', 60', 74'	Stadium: Southern Soccer Facility; Referee: Denis Palushaj

11 February	Cumberland United (3)	7–0	Para Hills West (-)	Clarence Gardens
19:00	Carr 24'; Gepp 32', 48'; Lamb 54', 85'; Briscoe 69'; Swan 90'	Report		Stadium: A.A. Bailey Reserve; Referee: Liam Miller

11 February	Port Adelaide Pirates (3)	1–2	Vipers FC (3)	Taperoo
19:00	Czapla 46'	Report	Rodrigues 32'; Jones 45'	Stadium: Ngarrpadla Josie Agius Reserve; Referee: Mark Michael

11 February	Mount Barker United (4)	1–2	Adelaide University (4)	Mount Barker
19:30	Rossi 14' (pen.)	Report	Mbarga 34' (pen.); Mayol 84'	Stadium: Summit Sport and Recreation Park; Referee: Andrew Kite

12 February	Para Hills East (-)	0–3	Eastern United (3)	Modbury North
15:00		Report	Lesi 11'; Zefi 83'; Okello 90'	Stadium: Ladywood Reserve; Referee: Daniel Faulkner

12 February	Adelaide Blue Eagles (3)	2–1	Adelaide Hills Hawks (4)	Marden
16:30	Isla Cacciavillani 3', 53'	Report	Jones 60' (o.g.)	Stadium: Marden Sports Complex; Referee: Garry Powers

12 February	Rostrevor Old Collegians (5)	1–2	Western Strikers (4)	Newton
17:00	Migliaccio 90+2'	Report	Dimas 31'; Pipicella 63' (o.g.)	Stadium: Steve Woodcock Sports Centre; Referee: Angus Macdonald

12 February	Ghan United (-)	5–3	Para Hills Knights (3)	Ferryden Park
18:00	Abbasi 24', 88', 92'; Hussaini 46'; Mosawee 79'	Report	Ulaj 5'; Mitev 91' (pen.), 95' (pen.)	Stadium: Ferryden Park Reserve; Referee: Tom Brinkworth

== Second round ==
The second round of the Federation Cup was also the fourth round of the 2023 Australia Cup preliminary rounds, featuring 21 teams from the previous round and the 11 teams from the National Premier Leagues South Australia.

All times are in ACDT

16 March	Playford City Patriots (3)	3–1	South Adelaide Panthers (2)	Edinburgh North
19:30	Trimboli 32', 45', 72'	Report	Cash 84'	Stadium: Ramsay Park; Referee: Regis Queffelec

18 March	West Adelaide (2)	4–5	West Torrens Birkalla (3)	West Beach
14:00	Dobrovolski 23'; Christofilos 46' (pen.); Toumazos 83' (pen.); Tatarelli 88'	Report	Ture 6' (pen.), 49'; Benouzekri 19'; Scambiatterra 90+5'; Stevenson 90+6'	Stadium: West Beach Parks Football Centre; Referee: Andrew Kite

18 March	Cumberland United (3)	0–4	North Eastern MetroStars (2)	Clarence Gardens
14:30		Report	Ayoubi 58', 83', 89'; Nagamatsu 66'	Stadium: A.A. Bailey Reserve; Referee: Eric Ford Sestili

18 March	Campbelltown City (2)	6–0	Adelaide University Grads Blue (5)	Newton
14:30	Piscioneri 9', 13'; Yoshikawa 45'; Allwright 62', 86'; Halliday 83'	Report		Stadium: Steve Woodcock Sports Centre; Referee: Tom Brinkworth

18 March	Croydon FC (2)	7–1	Tea Tree Gully City (-)	Regency Park
14:30	Caraccia 31', 63'; Kurikwimana 48'; Martinello 59', 90+3'; Hisamoto 79', 83'	Report	Green 88' (pen.)	Stadium: Regency Park Reserve; Referee: David Alberton

18 March	Sturt Lions (2)	6–1	Salisbury United (4)	Eden Hills
15:00	Altundag 17', 30'; Rodriguez 24', 48', 58'; Fusco 37'	Report	Pettit 50'	Stadium: Karinya Reserve; Referee: Gary Mooney

18 March	Western Strikers (4)	0–7	FK Beograd (2)	Royal Park
15:00		Report	Radice 18'; Beric 23', 27', 34' (pen.), 55'; Abetew 60'; Mori 74'	Stadium: Carnegie Reserve; Referee: Garry Powers

18 March	Adelaide City (2)	7–0	Pontian Eagles (4)	Oakden
15:00	Irabona 8'; Dawber 46'; Williams 61'; Battistella 63'; Kimishima 76' (pen.), 81', 87'	Report		Stadium: Adelaide City Park; Referee: Andrew Citti

18 March	Adelaide Blue Eagles (3)	1–3	Modbury Jets (2)	Marden
15:00	Canny 56' (pen.)	Report	Matteo 24'; Francesca 26'; Hernandez 29'	Stadium: Marden Sports Complex; Referee: Nick Elagin

18 March	Northern Demons (4)	2–3	Adelaide Olympic (2)	Port Pirie
15:30	Nestoras 79', 82'	Report	Konstandopoulos 2'; Sindahalaye 55', 85'	Stadium: Byrne Park; Referee: Joe-Jordan Tripoldi

18 March	Vipers FC (3)	0–1	Adelaide University (4)	St Clair
16:30		Report	Bahati 50'	Stadium: St Clair Oval; Referee: Bradley French

18 March	Modbury Vista (4)	2–6	Ghan United (-)	Wynn Vale
17:00	Essex 23'; Head 55'	Report	Teymouri 11', 53', 74'; Kamara 39'; Dadzie 41'; Hussaini 88'	Stadium: Newspot Stadium; Referee: Mark Michael

18 March	Seaford Rangers (4)	1–2 (a.e.t.)	Noarlunga United (4)	Port Noarlunga South
17:00	Taylor 2'	Report	Donk 80'; Smith 120'	Stadium: Karingal Reserve; Referee: Denis Palushaj

18 March	Eastern United (3)	2–1	Elizabeth Grove (-)	Athelstone
17:30	Salomone 32'; Lesi 84'	Report	Leahy 52'	Stadium: Athelstone Recreational Reserve; Referee: Rosario Iacobini

18 March	Adelaide Croatia Raiders (3)	0–3	Adelaide Comets (2)	Gepps Cross
18:00		Report	Mavrolambados 64', 80'; Kebede 70'	Stadium: Croatian Sports Centre; Referee: Liam Miller

19 March	Elizabeth Downs (-)	4–5 (a.e.t.)	Adelaide Cobras (3)	Elizabeth Downs
15:00	Farrell 46'; Watson 50', 87'; Gundlach 92'	Report	Acton 61', 90'; Panayi 69', 92'; Kim 107'	Stadium: Argana Park; Referee: Daniel Faulkner

== Third round ==
The third round of the Federation Cup was also the fifth round of the 2023 Australia Cup preliminary rounds.

All times are in ACST.

15 April	Campbelltown City (2)	3–2	Playford City Patriots (3)	Newton
14:30	Matsumoto 1', 52'; Marino 50'	Report	Mullen 9' (pen.); Townsend 60'	Stadium: Steve Woodcock Sports Centre; Referee: Daniel Faulkner

15 April	Croydon FC (2)	3–1	Sturt Lions (2)	Regency Park
14:30	Greco 52'; Benedetti 74'; Klappers 80' (o.g.)	Report	Rodriguez 61' (pen.)	Stadium: Regency Park Reserve; Referee: Daniel Goodwin

15 April	Adelaide City (2)	6–0	Adelaide Olympic (2)	Oakden
15:00	Bressan 5', 64'; Kimishima 9', 37'; Dawber 54'; Irabona 56'	Report		Stadium: Adelaide City Park; Referee: Christian Verdicchio

15 April	Adelaide Comets (2)	1–4	North Eastern MetroStars (2)	Gepps Cross
15:00	Ikonomopoulos 77'	Report	Gow 22' (pen.); Cittadini 36'; Ayoubi 42', 66'	Stadium: ServiceFM Stadium; Referee: Regis Queffelec

15 April	FK Beograd (2)	1–3	Adelaide Cobras (3)	Woodville West
19:00	Mori 90+4' (pen.)	Report	Panayi 20'; Monaco 35', 66'	Stadium: Frank Mitchell Park; Referee: Garry Powers

15 April	West Torrens Birkalla (3)	1–1 (a.e.t.) (5–4 p)	Noarlunga United (4)	Novar Gardens
19:30	Scambiatterra 75'	Report	Smith 28'	Stadium: Jack Smith Park; Referee: Liam Miller

15 April	Eastern United (3)	1–0 (a.e.t.)	Modbury Jets (2)	Athelstone
19:30	Lesi 95'	Report		Stadium: Athelstone Recreational Reserve; Referee: Eric Ford Sestili

16 April	Ghan United (-)	2–3	Adelaide University (4)	Ferryden Park
12:30	Hussaini 48'; Kamara 52'	Report	Solari 37'; Corbo 46'; Novis 55' (pen.)	Stadium: Ferryden Park Reserve; Referee: Gary Mooney

== Quarter-finals ==
The quarter-finals of the Federation Cup was also the sixth round of the 2023 Australia Cup preliminary rounds.

All times are in ACST

9 May	North Eastern MetroStars (2)	4–2	Adelaide Cobras (3)	Klemzig
19:30	Cittadini 31', 77', 90+6'; Gow 48' (pen.)	Report	Monaco 61'; Ditroia 87'	Stadium: T.K. Shutter Reserve; Referee: Eric Ford Sestili

10 May	West Torrens Birkalla (3)	2–0	Eastern United (3)	Novar Gardens
19:30	Ashwood 52'; Ture 56' (pen.)	Report		Stadium: Jack Smith Park; Referee: Christian Verdicchio

16 May	Adelaide University (4)	0–3	Croydon FC (2)	Mile End
19:00		Report	Kirk 47'; Brazzale 50'; Kurikwimana 87'	Stadium: SA Athletics Stadium; Referee: Daniel Faulkner

16 May	Campbelltown City (2)	1–0	Adelaide City (2)	Newton
19:30	Mullen 35'	Report		Stadium: Steve Woodcock Sports Centre; Referee: Regis Queffelec

== Semi-finals ==
The semi-finals of the Federation Cup was also the seventh round of the 2023 Australia Cup preliminary rounds, with the two winners qualifying for the 2023 Australia Cup.

All times are in ACST

31 May	West Torrens Birkalla (3)	0–5	North Eastern MetroStars (2)	Gepps Cross
19:30		Report	Temelkovski 22', 28', 65'; Cittadini 45', 53'	Stadium: ServiceFM Stadium; Referee: Eric Ford Sestili

7 June	Campbelltown City (2)	1–0	Croydon FC (2)	Gepps Cross
19:30	Yoshikawa 4'	Report		Stadium: ServiceFM Stadium; Referee: Daniel Cook

== Final ==
24 June
14:30 ACST

Campbelltown City	2–3 (a.e.t.)	North Eastern MetroStars
Yoshikawa 4'; Mullen 57'	Report	Gow 22', 41'; Nagamatsu 119'

ServiceFM Stadium, Gepps Cross
Attendance: 2,721
Referee: Regis Queffelec

== Top goalscorers ==
Rank	Player	Club	Goals
1	(Australia) Michael Cittadini	North Eastern MetroStars	6
2	(Australia) Austin Ayoubi	North Eastern MetroStars	5
2	(Japan) Katsuyoshi Kimishima	Adelaide City	5
2	(Australia) Yiannis Nestoras	Northern Demons	5
5	(Australia) Ninko Beric	FK Beograd	4
5	(Australia) Hamish Gow	North Eastern MetroStars	4
5	(Argentina) Gonzalo Rodriguez	Sturt Lions	4
5	(Australia) Anthony Ture	West Torrens Birkalla	4
9	13 players		3

== See also ==
- 2023 Football South Australia season
