= 2011 FFSA season =

Football Federation South Australia
- Season: 2011
- Champions: Adelaide Blue Eagles

The 2011 Football Federation South Australia season was the 105th season of soccer in South Australia, and the sixth under the FFSA format.

== 2011 FFSA Super League ==
FFSA Super League
- Season: 2011
- Champions: Grand Final; Adelaide Blue Eagles; Minor Premiership; North Eastern MetroStars
- Relegated: Para Hills Knights; Modbury Jets
- Matches: 90
- Goals: 247 (2.74 per match)
- Top goalscorer: Michael Matricciani (16 goals)
- Biggest home win: Adelaide City 8–0 Modbury Jets (11 April 2011)
- Biggest away win: Modbury Jets 1–10 North Eastern MetroStars (29 April 2011)
- Highest scoring: Modbury Jets 1–10 North Eastern MetroStars (29 April 2011) (11 goals)
- Longest winning run: 8 games Adelaide City
- Longest unbeaten run: 12 games Adelaide City
- Longest winless run: 11 games Croydon Kings
- Longest losing run: 4 games Modbury Jets; Croydon Kings

The 2011 South Australian Super League was the sixth edition of the FFSA Super League, the top level domestic association football competition in South Australia. 10 teams competed, all playing each other twice for a total of 18 rounds, with the top five at the end of the year qualifying for the McIntyre final five finals system to determine 1st to 5th place. At the end of the season, the bottom two placed teams were relegated to the 2012 FFSA Premier League.

=== League table ===
| Pos | Team | Pld | W | D | L | GF | GA | GD | Pts | Qualification or relegation |
|---|---|---|---|---|---|---|---|---|---|---|
| 1 | North Eastern MetroStars | 18 | 14 | 2 | 2 | 48 | 12 | +36 | 44 | Qualified for the 2011 FFSA Super League Finals |
| 2 | Adelaide City | 18 | 13 | 4 | 1 | 46 | 15 | +31 | 43 | Qualified for the 2011 FFSA Super League Finals |
| 3 | Adelaide Blue Eagles (C) | 18 | 10 | 3 | 5 | 23 | 19 | +4 | 33 | Qualified for the 2011 FFSA Super League Finals |
| 4 | Western Strikers | 18 | 8 | 3 | 7 | 22 | 19 | +3 | 27 | Qualified for the 2011 FFSA Super League Finals |
| 5 | Adelaide Galaxy | 18 | 7 | 4 | 7 | 26 | 25 | +1 | 25 | Qualified for the 2011 FFSA Super League Finals |
| 6 | Campbelltown City | 18 | 6 | 3 | 9 | 17 | 21 | −4 | 21 | |
| 7 | Adelaide Raiders | 18 | 5 | 3 | 10 | 24 | 30 | −6 | 18 | |
| 8 | Croydon Kings | 18 | 3 | 6 | 9 | 11 | 26 | −15 | 15 | |
| 9 | Para Hills Knights (R) | 18 | 3 | 4 | 11 | 12 | 31 | −19 | 13 | Relegated to the 2012 FFSA Premier League |
| 10 | Modbury Jets (R) | 18 | 3 | 4 | 11 | 18 | 49 | −31 | 13 | Relegated to the 2012 FFSA Premier League |

(C) Champions; (R) Relegated

=== Finals ===
Elimination and Qualifying Finals
2 | Adelaide City | 0
3 | Adelaide Blue Eagles | 4
4 | Western Strikers | 2
5 | Adelaide Galaxy | 1

Semifinals
1 | North Eastern MetroStars | 1
3 | Adelaide Blue Eagles | 3
2 | Adelaide City | 2
4 | Western Strikers | 1

Preliminary Final
1 | North Eastern MetroStars | 1 (5)
2 | Adelaide City | 1 (6)

Grand Final
2 | Adelaide City | 0 (5)
3 | Adelaide Blue Eagles | 0 (6)

== 2011 FFSA Premier League ==
FFSA Premier League
- Season: 2011
- Champions: Grand Final; Enfield City Falcons; Minor Premiership; Adelaide Comets
- Relegated: Adelaide Hills Hawks; Noarlunga United
- Matches: 90
- Top goalscorer: Elias Demourtzides (15 goals)
- Biggest home win: Enfield City Falcons 6–1 Noarlunga United (16 April 2011)
- Biggest away win: Noarlunga United 0–6 Enfield City Falcons (25 June 2011)
- Highest scoring: Adelaide Olympic 6–2 Cumberland United (4 June 2011)

The 2011 FFSA Premier League was the sixth edition of the FFSA Premier League as the second level domestic association football competition in South Australia. 10 teams competed, all playing each other twice for a total of 18 rounds, with the top five at the end of the year qualifying for the McIntyre final five finals system to determine 1st to 5th place. The League winners and Grand Final winners were promoted to the 2012 FFSA Super League, and the 9th and 10th placed teams were relegated to the 2012 FFSA State League.

=== League table ===
| Pos | Team | Pld | W | D | L | GF | GA | GD | Pts | Qualification or relegation |
|---|---|---|---|---|---|---|---|---|---|---|
| 1 | Adelaide Comets (P) | 18 | 11 | 4 | 3 | 41 | 24 | +17 | 37 | Promoted to the 2012 FFSA Super League |
| 2 | Port Adelaide Pirates | 18 | 11 | 2 | 5 | 37 | 22 | +15 | 35 | Qualified for the 2011 FFSA Premier League Finals |
| 3 | Enfield City (C, P) | 18 | 10 | 4 | 4 | 40 | 22 | +18 | 34 | Promoted to the 2012 FFSA Super League |
| 4 | Cumberland United | 18 | 6 | 6 | 6 | 31 | 30 | +1 | 24 | Qualified for the 2011 FFSA Premier League Finals |
| 5 | Adelaide Olympic | 18 | 6 | 6 | 6 | 33 | 35 | −2 | 24 | Qualified for the 2011 FFSA Premier League Finals |
| 6 | White City | 18 | 6 | 5 | 7 | 27 | 28 | −1 | 23 | |
| 7 | Adelaide Cobras | 18 | 6 | 3 | 9 | 22 | 25 | −3 | 21 | |
| 8 | Playford City | 18 | 6 | 3 | 9 | 21 | 30 | −9 | 21 | |
| 9 | Adelaide Hills Hawks | 18 | 5 | 4 | 9 | 16 | 60 | −44 | 19 | Relegated to the 2012 FFSA State League |
| 10 | Noarlunga United | 18 | 2 | 5 | 11 | 17 | 43 | −26 | 11 | Relegated to the 2012 FFSA State League |

(C) Champions; (P) Promoted

=== Finals ===
Elimination and Qualifying Finals
2 | Port Adelaide Pirates | 1
3 | Enfield City Falcons | 4
4 | Cumberland United | 2 (6)
5 | Adelaide Olympic | 2 (7)

Semifinals
1 | Adelaide Comets | 4
3 | Enfield City Falcons | 1
2 | Port Adelaide Pirates | 1
5 | Adelaide Olympic | 3

Preliminary Final
3 | Enfield City Falcons | 2
5 | Adelaide Olympic | 0

Grand Final
1 | Adelaide Comets | 1
3 | Enfield City Falcons | 4

== 2011 FFSA State League ==
FFSA State League
- Season: 2011
- Champions: South Adelaide
- Matches: 90
- Top goalscorer: Faustin Machochi; Aaron Phillips (16 goals each)
- Biggest home win: Salisbury United 12–0 Gawler (18 June 2011)
- Biggest away win: Sturt Lions 0–8 Western Toros (2 July 2011)
- Highest scoring: Salisbury United 12–0 Gawler (18 June 2011)

The 2011 FFSA State League was the sixth edition of the FFSA State League as the third level domestic association football competition in South Australia. 10 teams competed, all playing each other twice for a total of 18 rounds, with the top five at the end of the year qualifying for the McIntyre final five finals system to determine 1st to 5th place. The League winners and Grand Final winners were promoted to the 2012 FFSA Premier League.

=== League table ===
| Pos | Team | Pld | W | D | L | GF | GA | GD | Pts | Qualification or relegation |
|---|---|---|---|---|---|---|---|---|---|---|
| 1 | Salisbury United (P) | 18 | 14 | 2 | 2 | 53 | 14 | +39 | 44 | Promoted to the 2012 FFSA Premier League |
| 2 | West Adelaide | 18 | 14 | 1 | 3 | 67 | 23 | +44 | 43 | Qualified for the 2011 FFSA State League Finals |
| 3 | South Adelaide (C, P) | 18 | 10 | 2 | 6 | 43 | 26 | +17 | 32 | Promoted to the 2012 FFSA Premier League |
| 4 | Northern Demons | 18 | 10 | 1 | 7 | 39 | 33 | +6 | 31 | Qualified for the 2011 FFSA State League Finals |
| 5 | Seaford Rangers | 18 | 7 | 6 | 5 | 49 | 39 | +10 | 27 | Qualified for the 2011 FFSA State League Finals |
| 6 | Western Toros | 18 | 8 | 2 | 8 | 37 | 37 | 0 | 26 | |
| 7 | N.A.B. | 18 | 7 | 4 | 7 | 42 | 43 | −1 | 25 | |
| 8 | Sturt Lions | 18 | 3 | 4 | 11 | 19 | 55 | −36 | 13 | |
| 9 | Gawler Eagles | 18 | 2 | 3 | 13 | 16 | 60 | −44 | 9 | |
| 10 | The Cove | 18 | 2 | 1 | 15 | 12 | 47 | −35 | 7 | |

(C) Champions; (P) Promoted

=== Finals ===
Elimination and Qualifying Finals
2 | West Adelaide | 2
3 | South Adelaide | 3
4 | Northern Demons | 0
5 | Seaford Rangers | 1

Semifinals
1 | Salisbury United | 1
3 | South Adelaide | 2
2 | West Adelaide | 1 (6)
5 | Seaford Rangers | 1 (5)

Preliminary Final
1 | Salisbury United | 7
2 | West Adelaide | 2

Grand Final
1 | Salisbury United | 0
3 | South Adelaide | 3

== 2011 Women's Premier League ==
Women's Premier League
- Season: 2011
- Premiers: Metro United

The highest tier domestic football competition in South Australia for women was known for sponsorship reasons as the Adelaide Airport Women's Premier League. The 7 teams played a triple round-robin for a total of 18 games.

| Pos | Team | Pld | W | D | L | GF | GA | GD | Pts |
|---|---|---|---|---|---|---|---|---|---|
| 1 | Metro United (C) | 18 | 14 | 2 | 2 | 57 | 16 | +41 | 44 |
| 2 | Adelaide Olympic | 18 | 13 | 1 | 4 | 75 | 15 | +60 | 40 |
| 3 | Adelaide City | 18 | 13 | 1 | 4 | 76 | 19 | +57 | 40 |
| 4 | Cumberland United | 18 | 8 | 3 | 7 | 58 | 28 | +30 | 27 |
| 5 | Fulham United | 18 | 5 | 2 | 11 | 47 | 79 | −32 | 17 |
| 6 | Sturt Marion | 18 | 3 | 4 | 11 | 25 | 56 | −31 | 13 |
| 7 | South Adelaide | 18 | 0 | 1 | 17 | 13 | 158 | −145 | 1 |

Source: sportstg.com
Rules for classification: 1) points; 2) goal difference; 3) number of goals scored.
(C) Champions

== See also ==
- 2011 FFSA Premier League
- 2011 FFSA Super League
- 2011 FFSA State League
- National Premier Leagues South Australia
- Football Federation South Australia
