= 2024 FSA Federation Cup =

2024 Australia Cup South Australian preliminary rounds

Tournament details
- Country: Australia
- Dates: 16 February–6 July
- Teams: 52

Final positions
- Champions: Campbelltown City (3rd title)
- Runners-up: Modbury Jets
- Australia Cup: Campbelltown City; Modbury Jets

Tournament statistics
- Matches played: 51
- Goals scored: 223 (4.37 per match)
- Top goal scorer(s): Christopher Wieczorek (6 goals)

The 2024 Football South Australia Federation Cup, also known as the Australia Cup South Australian preliminary rounds until the semi-finals, was the 111th running of the Federation Cup, the main soccer knockout cup competition in South Australia. The competition also functioned as part of the 2024 Australia Cup preliminary rounds, with the two finalists qualifying for the main knockout competition.

Campbelltown City were champions for the third time, defeating Modbury Jets 3–0 in the final. North Eastern MetroStars were the defending champions, losing 1–2 in the third round to Adelaide Olympic.

== Schedule ==
Round	Draw date	Match dates	No. of fixtures	Teams	New entries this round
First round	22 January	16–18 February	20	52 → 32	41
Second round	21 February	14–16 March	16	32 → 16	11
Third round	20 March	13 April	8	16 → 8	None
Quarter-finals	17 April	7–15 May	4	8 → 4	None
Semi-finals	20 May	5–12 June	2	4 → 2	None
Final	—	6 July	1	2 → 1	None

== Teams ==
Location of teams participating in the Federation Cup

52 teams participated in the competition, 46 from the Greater Adelaide area, two from the Adelaide Hills region, two from the Limestone Coast, and one from Gawler and Port Pirie. National Premier Leagues South Australia, State League One and State League Two represent levels 2–4 on the unofficial Australian league system, and are required to participate in the Federation Cup. The South Australian Regional Leagues represent level 5. The South Australian Amateur Soccer League is not represented on the national league system. Adelaide United Youth are not eligible for the tournament, as the senior team will enter the Australia Cup competition at the round of 32.

Football South Australia affiliate clubs
NPL SA (2)	SA State League 1 (3)	SA State League 2 (4)
Adelaide City	Adelaide Blue Eagles	Adelaide Hills Hawks
Adelaide Comets	Adelaide Cobras	Adelaide University
Adelaide Croatia Raiders	Adelaide Victory	Eastern United
Adelaide Olympic	Cumberland United	Gawler Eagles
Campbelltown City	Fulham United	Modbury Vista
Croydon FC	Playford City Patriots	Mount Barker United
Modbury Jets	Salisbury United	Noarlunga United
North Eastern MetroStars	Sturt Lions	Northern Demons
FK Beograd	Vipers FC	Pontian Eagles
Para Hills Knights	West Adelaide	Port Adelaide Pirates
South Adelaide Panthers	Western Strikers	Seaford Rangers
	West Torrens Birkalla	The Cove
Non-affiliate clubs
Regional Leagues (5)		Amateur Leagues (-)
Collegiate	Limestone Coast	Amateur Leagues (-)
Pembroke Old Scholars	International SC	Adelaide Pumas
Rostrevor Old Collegians	Naracoorte United	Adelaide Titans
Sacred Heart Old Collegians		BOSA FC
		Elizabeth Downs
Elizabeth Grove
Ghan United
Ingle Farm
Messinian Association Hawks
Para Hills East
Pitbulls FC
Tea Tree Gully City
Unley United

== Bracket ==
First round Third preliminary round
Adelaide Pumas	0
Seaford Rangers	2
Adelaide Hills Hawks	0
Adelaide Cobras	4
Ghan United	1
Adelaide Victory	4
Salisbury United	7
Rostrevor Old Collegians	0
Sacred Heart Old Collegians	2
Elizabeth Grove (a.e.t.)	3
Adelaide Titans	0
Northern Demons	3
Elizabeth Downs	6
Port Adelaide Pirates	3
Gawler Eagles	3
Noarlunga United	0
Unley United	1
Messinian Association Hawks	2
Western Strikers	6
Pembroke Old Scholars	0
Adelaide Blue Eagles	1
Playford City Patriots	0
Cumberland United	14
Ingle Farm	0
Modbury Vista	12
Naracoorte United	0
Mount Barker United	0
The Cove	3
Pontian Eagles	2
Adelaide University	1
West Adelaide	3
Eastern United	1
BOSA FC	0
Tea Tree Gully City	3
Vipers FC	1
Sturt Lions	2
Fulham United	15
International SC	0
Para Hils East	3
West Torrens Birkalla	2

Second round Fourth preliminary round
Seaford Rangers	0
Modbury Jets	4
Adelaide Cobras	1
Adelaide Victory	2
Salisbury United	0
North Eastern MetroStars	6
Elizabeth Grove	1
Croydon FC	7
Para Hills Knights	0
Northern Demons	3
Elizabeth Downs	3
Gawler Eagles	1
Adelaide City	2
South Adelaide Panthers	1
Messinian Association Hawks	1
Adelaide Olympic	3
Western Strikers	0
Campbelltown City	2
Adelaide Croatia Raiders	2 (2)
Adelaide Blue Eagles (p)	2 (4)
Cumberland United	4
Modbury Vista	0
The Cove	1
Pontian Eagles	0
Pitbulls FC	1
West Adelaide	3
Tea Tree Gully City	1
Adelaide Comets	4
Sturt Lions	3 (4)
Fulham United (p)	3 (5)
Para Hills East	1
FK Beograd	3

Third round Fifth preliminary round
Modbury Jets	2
Adelaide Victory	1
North Eastern MetroStars	1
Croydon FC	2
Northern Demons	3
Elizabeth Downs	0
Adelaide City	0
Adelaide Olympic	2
Campbelltown City	3
Adelaide Blue Eagles	1
Cumberland United	3
The Cove	1
West Adelaide	1
Adelaide Comets	3
Fulham United	1
FK Beogad	4

Quarter-finals; Sixth preliminary round
Modbury Jets	4
Croydon FC	0
Northern Demons	0
Adelaide Olympic	4
Campbelltown City	2
Cumberland United	1
Adelaide Comets	3
FK Beograd	0

Semi-finals; Seventh preliminary round
Modbury Jets	1
Adelaide Olympic	0
Campbelltown City	2
Adelaide Comets	0

Final
Modbury Jets	0
Campbelltown City	3

== First round ==
The first round of the Federation Cup was also the third round of the 2024 Australia Cup preliminary rounds. Pitbulls FC (-) received a bye to the second round. The round includes teams from all levels except the National Premier League.

All times are in ACDT.

16 February	Elizabeth Downs (-)	6–3	Port Adelaide Pirates (4)	Elizabeth Downs
19:00	Pullinen 2', 60', 77'; Brennan 32'; Farrell 62'; McMullen 65'	Report	Dembele 15'; Mavromatis 37'; Farrell 45+4' (o.g.)	Stadium: Argana Park; Referee: Rosario Iacobini

16 February	BOSA FC (-)	0–3	Tea Tree Gully City (-)	Oakden
19:00		Report	Green 22'; Williams 41', 56'	Stadium: Adelaide City Park; Referee: Angus MacDonald

16 February	Adelaide Blue Eagles (3)	1–0	Playford City Patriots (3)	Marden
19:15	Da Silva 32'	Report		Stadium: Marden Sports Complex; Referee: Daniel Goodwin

16 February	Gawler Eagles (4)	3–0	Noarlunga United (4)	Evanston Gardens
19:30	Toskas 21'; Fusco 62', 84'	Report		Stadium: Karbeethan Reserve; Referee: David Alberton

16 February	Salisbury United (3)	7–0	Rostrevor Old Collegians (5)	Burton
19:30	Strain 18', 35'; Marchioro 45+1'; Loua 50'; Shinto 72'; Vella 77'; Tamkin 88'	Report		Stadium: PSD Energy Park; Referee: Tom Brinkworth

16 February	Western Strikers (3)	6–0	Pembroke Old Scholars (5)	Royal Park
19:45	Forrest 8' (o.g.); Noujaim 19', 42'; D'Alfonso 38' (pen.); Binetti 75'; Watson 86'	Report		Stadium: Carnegie Reserve; Referee: Garry Powers

17 February	Fulham United (3)	15–0	International SC (5)	West Beach
14:00	Filsell 4'; Wieczorek 12', 17', 31', 34', 44', 48'; Murray 15', 43'; Borghetto 29' (pen.), 38', 76'; Kipping 63' (o.g.); Scalzi 86'; Carbone 89'	Report		Stadium: West Beach Parks Football Centre; Referee: Joe-Jordan Tripodi

17 February	Adelaide Hills Hawks (4)	0–4	Adelaide Cobras (3)	Woodside
14:30		Report	Panayi 8', 58'; Kojima 85'; Harpas 86'	Stadium: Hawks Nest; Referee: Eric Ford Sestili

17 February	Adelaide Pumas (-)	0–2	Seaford Rangers (4)	Valley View
14:30		Report	Henkens 25'; Anderson 75'	Stadium: Thomas Turner Reserve; Referee: Zakir Hussaini

17 February	Cumberland United (3)	14–0	Ingle Farm (-)	Clarence Gardens
14:30	Munro 13'; Carr 15', 49'; Tuohy 17', 38', 61'; Gepp 32', 66'; Wright 59'; Miller 78', 90+2'; Micallef 80', 85'; Abdullahi 89'	Report		Stadium: A.A. Bailey Reserve; Referee: Andrew Kite

17 February	Mount Barker United (4)	0–3	The Cove (4)	Mount Barker
14:30		Report	Foglia 47', 78'; Grant 65'	Stadium: Summit Sport and Recreation Park; Referee: Gary Mooney

17 February	Modbury Vista (4)	12–0	Naracoorte United (5)	Gepps Cross
15:00	Trotta 21', 61', 83'; Wegener 34', 42', 55', 86'; Head 38'; Cole 45'; Miller 50', 76'; Savill 71'	Report		Stadium: ServiceFM Stadium; Referee: Denis Palushaj

17 February	Sacred Heart Old Collegians (5)	2–3 (a.e.t.)	Elizabeth Grove (-)	Somerton Park
15:00	Kehoe 16'; Lavranos 26'	Report	Djawas 6'; Lewis 90+1' (pen.), 113'	Stadium: Sacred Heart College; Referee: Andrew Citti

17 February	Vipers FC (3)	1–2	Sturt Lions (3)	St Clair
15:00	Jones 17'	Report	Marrone 45+1'; Elewaut 46'	Stadium: St Clair Oval; Referee: Liam Miller

17 February	Adelaide Titans (-)	0–3	Northern Demons (4)	Athelstone
18:00		Report	Sciancalepore 45+3'; Baragomwa 53' (pen.); Kouimtzis 73'	Stadium: Athelstone Recreation Reserve; Referee: Dion Turner

17 February	Ghan United (-)	1–4	Adelaide Victory (3)	Gepps Cross
18:00	Kouakou 38' (pen.)	Report	Demasi 14' (pen.); D'Agostino 27'; Doyle 85'; Galluccio 90+1'	Stadium: ServiceFM Stadium; Referee: Steve Vlassis

17 February	Pontian Eagles (4)	2–1	Adelaide University (4)	Paralowie
19:00	Kashindi 26'; Fontanarosa 90+1'	Report	Frishna 75'	Stadium: Yalumba Drive Reserve; Referee: Mark Michael

17 February	West Adelaide (3)	3–1	Eastern United (4)	Athelstone
20:00	Wood 27'; O'Donnell 66'; Katsigiannis 90+6'	Report	Solari 16'	Stadium: Athelstone Recreation Reserve; Referee: Mon Bahadur Khadka

18 February	Unley United (-)	1–2	Messinian Association Hawks (-)	West Beach
17:00	Nikolla 57'	Report	Commisso 15'; Mantis 45'	Stadium: West Beach Parks Football Centre; Referee: Jacky Chang

18 February	Para Hills East (-)	3–2	West Torrens Birkalla (3)	Modbury North
18:00	Garcia 45+1' (pen.); Bernardi 48', 57'	Report	Morris 44'; Ahmad 76'	Stadium: Ladywood Reserve; Referee: Kristen Nugent

== Second round ==
The second round of the Federation Cup was also the fourth round of the 2024 Australia Cup preliminary rounds, featuring 21 teams from the previous round and the 11 teams from the National Premier Leagues South Australia.

All times are in ACDT

14 March	Seaford Rangers (4)	0–4	Modbury Jets (2)	Port Noarlunga South
19:30		Report	Macheda 17', 74'; Schimizzi 47'; Dowsett 78' (o.g.)	Stadium: Karingal Reserve; Referee: Curtis Wordsworth

15 March	Elizabeth Downs (-)	3–1	Gawler Eagles (4)	Elizabeth Downs
19:00	Brennan 28'; Hulls 89'; Parisi 90+1'	Report	O'Rielly 90+6'	Stadium: Argana Park; Referee: Daniel Cook

15 March	Tea Tree Gully City (-)	1–4	Adelaide Comets (2)	Surrey Downs
19:00	Williams 57' (pen.)	Report	Zacharakis 12'; Ikonomopoulos 34'; Fernandez Garrido 40', 76'	Stadium: Tilley Reserve; Referee: Rosario Iacobini

15 March	Western Strikers (3)	0–2	Campbelltown City (2)	Royal Park
19:45		Report	Mori 56'; Melisi 59'	Stadium: Carnegie Reserve; Referee: Daniel Goodwin

16 March	Salisbury United (3)	0–6	North Eastern MetroStars (2)	Burton
14:00		Report	Cittadini 16', 32', 75'; Woodfin 29', 45'; Gow 83'	Stadium: PSD Energy Park; Referee: Garry Powers

16 March	Messinian Association Hawks (-)	1–3	Adelaide Olympic (2)	Torrensville
15:00	Ellul 56'	Report	Benvenuto 35'; Kamara 75'; Kebede 85'	Stadium: Kings Reserve; Referee: Denis Palushaj

16 March	Pitbulls FC (-)	1–3	West Adelaide (3)	Brahma Lodge
15:00	Tamba 4'	Report	Katsigiannis 51' (pen.); Toumazos 85'; Burkhardt 88'	Stadium: Cockburn Green; Referee: Daniel Faulkner

16 March	Adelaide Cobras (3)	1–2	Adelaide Victory (3)	Plympton
15:00	Panayi 27'	Report	D'Agostino 12'; John 77'	Stadium: Pro Paint and Panel Oval; Referee: Eric Ford Sestili

16 March	Para Hills Knights (2)	0–3	Northern Demons (4)	Para Hills West
15:30		Report	Rahma 26'; Saniel 41', 90+6'	Stadium: Feel Good Physio Co Stadium; Referee: Mark Michael

16 March	Cumberland United (3)	4–0	Modbury Vista (4)	Clarence Gardens
15:30	Micallef 7'; Munro 54', 70'; Abdullahi 90+1'	Report		Stadium: A.A. Bailey Reserve; Referee: Dion Turner

16 March	Elizabeth Grove (-)	1–7	Croydon FC (2)	Elizabeth
16:30	Djawas 27'	Report	Carle 22', 42'; Martinello 45+1'; Diamantis 48', 53', 90+5'; Hisamoto 67'	Stadium: Dauntsey Reserve; Referee: David Alberton

16 March	Adelaide Croatia Raiders (2)	2–2 (a.e.t.) (2–4 p)	Adelaide Blue Eagles (3)	Gepps Cross
17:00	Trimboli 86'; Van der Hout 90+7'	Report	De Lucia 47'; Isla Cacciavillani 81'	Stadium: Croatian Sports Centre; Referee: Gary Mooney
	Penalties
	Campbell (penalty missed); Trimboli (penalty missed); Thompson (penalty scored); Kimishima (penalty scored)		(penalty scored) Da Silva; (penalty scored) Signore; (penalty scored) Adjassou; (penalty missed) Panozzo; (penalty scored) Ieraci

16 March	Adelaide City (2)	2–1	South Adelaide Panthers (2)	Oakden
17:00	Pisconeri 35'; Bucco 76' (pen.)	Report	Rideout 45+2'	Stadium: Adelaide City Park; Referee: Christian Verdicchio

16 March	Sturt Lions (3)	3–3 (a.e.t.) (4–5 p)	Fulham United (3)	Eden Hills
17:00	Elewaut 56', 56'; Sortini 114'	Report	Greco 67'; Matto 88'; Bouzalas 115'	Stadium: Karinya Reserve; Referee: Andrew Kite

16 March	The Cove (4)	1–0	Pontian Eagles (4)	Trott Park
19:00	Grant 89'	Report		Stadium: Southern Soccer Facility; Referee: Andrew Citti

17 March	Para Hills East (-)	1–3	FK Beograd (2)	Modbury North
15:00	Mayol 9'	Report	Shearer 49', 61', 90+4'	Stadium: Ladywood Reserve; Referee: Mark Jennings

== Third round ==
The third round of the Federation Cup was also the fifth round of the 2024 Australia Cup preliminary rounds.

All times are in ACST

13 April	Northern Demons (4)	3–0	Elizabeth Downs (-)	Port Pirie
14:00	Kouimtzis 6'; Spadavecchia 79'; Rahma 80'	Report		Stadium: Byrne Park; Referee: Gary Mooney

13 April	Adelaide City (2)	0–2	Adelaide Olympic (2)	Oakden
14:30		Report	Torriani 34'; Kamara 79'	Stadium: Adelaide City Park

13 April	Campbelltown City (2)	3–1	Adelaide Blue Eagles (3)	Newton
14:30	Mori 40'; Mullen 73'; Allwright 86'	Report	Isla Cacciavillani 90+1'	Stadium: Steve Woodcock Sports Centre; Referee: Tom Brinkworth

13 April	Cumberland United (3)	3–1	The Cove (4)	Clarence Gardens
14:30	Carr 43'; Oikawa 58'; Gepp 74'	Report	Visser 34'	Stadium: A.A. Bailey Reserve; Referee: Marc Padros

13 April	West Adelaide (3)	1–3	Adelaide Comets (2)	Athelstone
15:00	Gollan 77'	Report	Ikonomopoulos 5'; Irabona 45'; Cook 90+1'	Stadium: Athelstone Recreation Reserve; Referee: Andrew Kite

13 April	North Eastern MetroStars (2)	1–2	Croydon FC (2)	Klemzig
15:00	Cittadini 31'	Report	Carle 62'; Bartkowski 81'	Stadium: T.K. Shutter Reserve; Referee: Christian Verdicchio

13 April	Modbury Jets (2)	2–1	Adelaide Victory (3)	Ridgehaven
15:00	O'Doherty 76'; McCabe 79'	Report		Stadium: Smith Partners Stadium

13 April	Fulham United (3)	1–4	FK Beograd (2)	West Beach
18:00	Murphy 3'	Report	Beric 5'; Shearer 54'; Trimboli 62', 86'	Stadium: West Beach Parks Football Centre; Referee: Liam Miller

== Quarter-finals ==
The quarter-finals of the Federation Cup was also the sixth round of the 2024 Australia Cup preliminary rounds.

All times are in ACST

7 May	Campbelltown City (2)	2–1	Cumberland United (3)	Newton
19:30	Mori 6'; Marino 90+4'	Report	Gepp 61'	Stadium: Steve Woodcock Sports Centre; Referee: Christian Verdicchio

7 May	Modbury Jets (2)	4–0	Croydon FC (2)	Ridgehaven
19:30	Hernandez 7'; Schimizzi 60'; Macheda 67'; McCabe 77'	Report		Stadium: Smith Partners Stadium; Referee: Curtis Wordsworth

14 May	Adelaide Comets (2)	3–0	FK Beograd (2)	Novar Gardens
19:45	Yull 75'; Fernandez Garrido 78'; Ikonomopoulos 90'	Report		Stadium: Jack Smith Park; Referee: Daniel Faulkner

15 May	Northern Demons (4)	0–4	Adelaide Olympic (2)	Angle Park
19:30		Report	Tsarkani 12', 32'; Spadavecchia 45+1' (o.g.); Habonimana 81'	Stadium: APEX Football Stadium; Referee: Tom Brinkworth

== Semi-finals ==
The semi-finals of the Federation Cup was also the seventh round of the 2024 Australia Cup preliminary rounds, with the two winners qualifying for the 2024 Australia Cup.

All times are in ACST

5 June	Modbury Jets (2)	1–0	Adelaide Olympic (2)	Gepps Cross
19:30	Tramontin 58' (o.g.)	Report		Stadium: ServiceFM Stadium; Referee: Curtis Wordsworth

12 June	Campbelltown City (2)	2–0	Adelaide Comets (2)	Gepps Cross
19:30	Marino 37', 70'	Report		Stadium: ServiceFM Stadium; Referee: Eric Ford Sestili

== Final ==
6 July
14:30 ACST

Modbury Jets	0–3	Campbelltown City
	Report	Marino 14'; Mori 66', 71'

ServiceFM Stadium, Gepps Cross
Referee: Christian Verdicchio

== Top goalscorers ==
Rank	Player	Club	Goals
1	Christopher Wieczorek	Fulham United	6
2	Joshua Mori	Campbelltwon City	5
3	Michael Cittadini	North Eastern MetroStars	4
3	Harley Gepp	Cumberland United	4
3	Marc Marino	Campbelltown City	4
3	Craig Shearer	FK Beograd	4
3	Cooper Wegener	Modbury Vista	4
8	16 players		3

== See also ==
- 2024 Football South Australia season
