= 2006 FFSA season =

Football Federation South Australia
- Season: 2006
- Champions: Adelaide City

The 2006 Football Federation South Australia season was the 100th season of soccer in South Australia, and the first under the FFSA format.

== 2006 FFSA Super League ==
South Australian Super League
- Season: 2006
- Champions: Adelaide City
- Relegated: Cumberland United
- Matches: 90
- Biggest home win: Adelaide City 6–0 Cumberland United (9 September 2006)
- Biggest away win: White City 0–5 MetroStars (19 August 2006)
- Highest scoring: Adelaide Galaxy 7–3 White City (12 August 2006) (10 goals)

The 2006 South Australian Super League was the first season of the South Australian Super League, the new top division of association football in South Australia, replacing the South Australian Premier League, which became the second division. It was also the first year that football in South Australia was run by the Football Federation of South Australia, which replaced the South Australian Soccer Federation. The season came down to a final round relegation battle between White City Woodville and Adelaide Olympic. Olympic lost 3–1 at Modbury while White City went down 1–0 away to Cumberland. This sent Olympic down to play in the Premier League in 2007. Adelaide City won the title with games to spare after being runaway leaders, finishing the season unbeaten.

Pos	Team	Pld	W	D	L	GF	GA	GD	Pts	Qualification or relegation
1	Adelaide City (C)	18	10	8	0	37	13	+24	38	Qualification for Presidents Cup
2	Adelaide Galaxy	18	8	5	5	34	25	+9	29	Qualification for Presidents Cup
3	Adelaide Raiders	18	6	10	2	19	16	+3	28	Qualification for Presidents Cup
4	Modbury Jets	18	8	4	6	24	23	+1	28	Qualification for Presidents Cup
5	Campbelltown City	18	7	6	5	32	25	+7	27	Qualification for Presidents Cup
6	Adelaide Blue Eagles	18	7	6	5	27	22	+5	27	Qualification for Presidents Cup
7	North Eastern MetroStars	18	5	9	4	21	17	+4	24	Qualification for Presidents Cup
8	Cumberland United	18	5	2	11	10	31	−21	17	Qualification for Presidents Cup
9	White City	18	3	3	12	18	32	−14	12	
10	Adelaide Olympic (R)	18	2	5	11	18	36	−18	11	Relegation to FFSA Premier League

(C) Champions; (R) Relegated

== 2006 FFSA Premier League ==
FFSA Premier League
- Season: 2006
- Promoted: Para Hills Knights
- Relegated: Noarlunga United; Salisbury United
- Matches: 90
- Biggest home win: Para Hills Knights 6–1 Adelaide Hills (13 May 2006); Para Hills Knights 6–1 Noarlunga United (27 May 2006)
- Biggest away win: Port Adelaide Pirates 0–7 Para Hills Knights (29 July 2006)
- Highest scoring: Playford City 4–7 Noarlunga United (12 June 2006) (11 goals)

The 2006 FFSA Premier League was the first edition of the FFSA Premier League as the second level domestic association football competition in South Australia. 10 teams competed, all playing each other twice for a total of 18 rounds, with the League winners promoted to the 2007 FFSA Super League, and the bottom two placed teams were relegated to the 2007 FFSA State League.

Pos	Team	Pld	W	D	L	GF	GA	GD	Pts	Promotion or relegation
1	Para Hills Knights (C, P)	18	14	3	1	56	19	+37	45	Promotion to FFSA Super League
2	Enfield City	18	11	5	2	39	18	+21	38	
3	Port Adelaide Pirates	18	12	0	6	43	34	+9	36	
4	Croydon Kings	18	7	3	8	24	24	0	24	
5	Playford City	18	6	3	9	36	37	−1	21	
6	Northern Demons	18	6	3	9	24	31	−7	21	
7	Adelaide Hills Hawks	18	6	2	10	26	41	−15	20	
8	South Adelaide	18	6	1	11	17	35	−18	19	
9	Noarlunga United (R)	18	5	2	11	38	44	−6	17	Relegation to FFSA State League
10	Salisbury United (R)	18	5	2	11	20	40	−20	17	Relegation to FFSA State League

(C) Champions; (P) Promoted; (R) Relegated

== 2006 FFSA State League ==
FFSA State League
- Season: 2006
- Promoted: Adelaide Cobras; Western Strikers
- Matches: 84
- Biggest home win: Western Strikers 7–0 Western Toros (16 September 2006)
- Biggest away win: Western Toros 0–10 Adelaide Cobras (13 May 2006)
- Highest scoring: Western Toros 0–10 Adelaide Cobras (13 May 2006)

The 2006 FFSA State League was the first edition of the FFSA State League as the third level domestic association football competition in South Australia. 8 teams competed, all playing each other three times for a total of 21 rounds. The League winners and second placers were promoted to the 2007 FFSA Premier League.

Pos	Team	Pld	W	D	L	GF	GA	GD	Pts	Promotion
1	Adelaide Cobras (C, P)	21	18	2	1	74	15	+59	56	Promotion to FFSA Premier League
2	Western Strikers (P)	21	16	1	4	51	12	+39	49	Promotion to FFSA Premier League
3	Adelaide Comets	21	10	6	5	41	24	+17	36	
4	N.A.B.	21	8	3	10	22	32	−10	27	
5	Port Pirie City	21	7	4	10	33	46	−13	25	
6	Seaford Rangers	21	4	5	12	33	55	−22	17	
7	Gawler Eagles	21	3	5	13	29	57	−28	14	
8	Western Toros	21	2	6	13	26	68	−42	12	

Source: https://archive.org/details/football-federation-south-australia-yearbook-2007/page/n41/mode/2up
(C) Champions; (P) Promoted

== See also ==
- 2006 FFSA Premier League
- 2006 FFSA Super League
- 2006 FFSA State League
- National Premier Leagues South Australia
- Football Federation South Australia
