= 2025 FSA Federation Cup =

2025 Australia Cup South Australian preliminary rounds

Tournament details
- Country: Australia
- Dates: 6 March–12 July
- Teams: 57

Final positions
- Champions: North Eastern MetroStars (7th title)
- Runners-up: Adelaide Croatia Raiders
- Australia Cup: Adelaide Croatia Raiders; North Eastern MetroStars

Tournament statistics
- Matches played: 54
- Goals scored: 248 (4.59 per match)

The 2025 Football South Australia Federation Cup, also known as the Australia Cup South Australian preliminary rounds (Note: Also known as the Hahn Australia Cup South Australian preliminary rounds for sponsorship reasons.) until the semi-finals, was the 112th running of the Federation Cup, the main soccer knockout cup competition in South Australia. The competition also functioned as part of the 2025 Australia Cup preliminary rounds, with the two finalists qualifying for the main competition.

North Eastern MetroStars were champions for the seventh time, defeating Adelaide Croatia Raiders 3–1 in the final. Campbelltown City were the defending champions, losing 1–3 in the quarter-finals to eventual winners North Eastern MetroStars.

== Schedule ==
Round	Draw date	Match dates	No. of fixtures	Teams	New entries this round
First round	5 February	6–12 March	25	57 → 32	50
Second round	12 March	27–30 March	16	32 → 16	7
Third round	2 April	17–21 April	8	16 → 8	None
Quarter-finals	23 April	13–21 May	4	8 → 4	None
Semi-finals	26 May	11–18 June	2	4 → 2	None
Final	—	12 July	1	2 → 1	None

== Teams ==
Location of teams participating in the Federation Cup. Note that Portland Panthers are located in Portland in south-west Victoria.

57 teams participated in the competition, 49 from the Greater Adelaide area, three from Mount Gambier, two from the Adelaide Hills region, and one from Gawler, Naracoorte, Port Pirie, and Portland (in south-west Victoria). National Premier Leagues South Australia, State League One and State League Two represent levels 2–4 on the unofficial Australian league system, and are required to participate in the Federation Cup. The South Australian Regional Leagues represent level 5. The South Australian Amateur Soccer League is not represented on the national league system. Adelaide United Youth are not eligible for the tournament, as the senior team will enter the Australia Cup competition at the round of 32.

Registrations for non-affiliate clubs to participate in the competition opened on 8 January and closed on 31 January. Unlike previous seasons, regional affiliate clubs hosted if they were drawn against a Football South Australia affiliate club or amateur league club.

Football South Australia affiliate clubs
NPL SA (2)	SA State League 1 (3)	SA State League 2 (4)	
NPL SA (2)	SA State League 1 (3)	North	South
Adelaide City	Adelaide Blue Eagles	Adelaide Atletico	Adelaide Hills Hawks
Adelaide Comets	Adelaide Olympic	Elizabeth Grove	Adelaide Titans
Adelaide Croatia Raiders	Adelaide Omonia Cobras	Gawler Eagles	Adelaide University
Campbelltown City	Cumberland United	Ghan United	Eastern United
Croydon FC	Fulham United	Modbury Vista	Mount Barker United
FK Beograd	Pontian Eagles	Northern Demons	Noarlunga United
Modbury Jets	Salisbury United	Port Adelaide	Seaford Rangers
North Eastern MetroStars	South Adelaide Panthers	Salisbury Inter	Western Strikers
Para Hills Knights	Sturt Lions		
Playford City	The Cove		
West Torrens Birkalla	Vipers FC		
	West Adelaide		
Non-affiliate clubs
Regional Leagues (5)	Amateur Leagues (-)		
Limestone Coast	Amateur Leagues (-)		
Apollo FC	Adelaide Brasfoot	Adelaide Eagles	Angle Vale
Gambier Centrals	BOSA FC	Croydon Cougars	Elizabeth Downs
International SC	Old Ignatians	Para Hills East	Para Hills United
Naracoorte United	Para Hills West	Pitbulls FC	Southern Knights
Portland Panthers	Tea Tree Gully		

== Bracket ==
First round Third preliminary round
Portland Panthers	0
Croydon Cougars	13
Ghan United	2
Northern Demons	1
Salisbury United	1
Playford City	2
Western Strikers	1
Gawler Eagles (a.e.t.)	2
Adelaide Omonia Cobras	0
Modbury Jets	1
Noarlunga United	2
Salisbury Inter	4
Elizabeth Downs	2
Seaford Rangers	5
Pontian Eagles	3
BOSA FC	1
Adelaide Comets	4
Modbury Vista	0
Para Hills East	5
South Adelaide Panthers	0
Apollo FC	0
Adelaide Croatia Raiders	15
Adelaide Brasfoot	4
Elizabeth Grove (a.e.t.)	5
Vipers FC	3
Eastern United	2
Cumberland United	3
Old Ignatians	0
Adelaide Hills Hawks	1
Para Hills West	0
Southern Knights
West Adelaide	w/o
Naracoorte United	0
The Cove	16
Mount Barker United	3
Adelaide Atletico	6
Para Hills United	1
Adelaide University	4
Gambier Centrals	1
Adelaide Olympic	5
Pitbulls FC	1
Adelaide Blue Eagles	3
International SC	0
Adelaide Titans	2
Fulham United	3
Port Adelaide	1
Sturt Lions	6
Angle Vale	1
Tea Tree Gully	w/o
Adelaide Eagles

Second round Fourth preliminary round
Croydon Cougars	0
Ghan United	5
Campbelltown City	2
Playford City	0
Gawler Eagles	1
North Eastern MetroStars	2
Modbury Jets	2
Para Hills Knights	1
West Torrens Birkalla (p)	1 (5)
Adelaide City	1 (4)
Croydon FC	2
Salisbury Inter	1
Seaford Rangers (p)	2 (3)
Pontian Eagles	2 (1)
Adelaide Comets	3
Para Hills East	1
Adelaide Croatia Raiders	6
Elizabeth Grove	0
Vipers FC	0
Cumberland United	3
Adelaide Hills Hawks	2
West Adelaide	1
The Cove	2
Adelaide Atletico	0
Adelaide University	1
Adelaide Olympic	2
FK Beograd	4
Adelaide Blue Eagles	0
Adelaide Titans	1
Fulham United	5
Sturt Lions	4
Tea Tree Gully	1

Third round Fifth preliminary round
Ghan United	1
Campbelltown City	3
North Eastern MetroStars	4
Modbury Jets	1
West Torrens Birkalla	3
Croydon FC	0
Seaford Rangers	2
Adelaide Comets	4
Adelaide Croatia Raiders	3
Cumberland United	2
Adelaide Hills Hawks	2
The Cove	0
Adelaide Olympic	0
FK Beograd	3
Fulham United	3
Sturt Lions	1

Quarter-finals; Sixth preliminary round
Campbelltown City	1
North Eastern MetroStars	3
West Torrens Birkalla	0
Adelaide Comets	3
Adelaide Croatia Raiders	2
Adelaide Hills Hawks	1
FK Beograd (p)	3 (5)
Fulham United	3 (4)

Semi-finals; Seventh preliminary round
North Eastern MetroStars (p)	1 (3)
Adelaide Comets	1 (1)
Adelaide Croatia Raiders	1
FK Beograd	0

Final
North Eastern MetroStars	3
Adelaide Croatia Raiders	1

== First round ==
The first round of the Federation Cup was also the third round of the 2025 Australia Cup preliminary rounds. National Premier League teams Adelaide Comets, Adelaide Croatia Raiders, Modbury Jets, and Playford City were drawn into this round, with all other NPL teams given a bye.

All times are in ACDT.

6 March	Adelaide Comets (2)	4–0	Modbury Vista (4)	Adelaide
19:15	Vatenos 21'; Stojanovic 45+1'; Mavrolambados 68'; Oliveira Lobo 70'	Report		Stadium: LJ Hooker-Mile End Sports Park; Referee: Christian Verdicchio

7 March	Adelaide Brasfoot (-)	4–5 (a.e.t.)	Elizabeth Grove (4)	Plympton
18:00	Macedo 30'; Turibio 33'; Maqueira 45+4' (pen.); Diniz Rocha 60'	Report	Alderson-Darling 19'; Marley-McFall 74', 78' (pen.), 90+3'; Docherty 112'	Stadium: Pro Paint and Panel Oval; Referee: Thomas Temby

7 March	Adelaide Hills Hawks (4)	1–0	Para Hills West (-)	Woodside
19:00	Savill 74'	Report		Stadium: Hawks Nest; Referee: Bradley French

7 March	Sturt Lions (3)	6–1	Angle Vale (-)	Eden Hills
19:00	Altundag 1'; Munro 7', 14'; Mohtashami 21'; Garrett 54'; Rogers 83'	Report	Troiani 5'	Stadium: Karinya Reserve; Referee: Brendan King

7 March	Cumberland United (3)	3–0	Old Ignatians (-)	Clarence Gardens
19:30	Swan 22'; Polisi 35'; Redman 47'	Report		Stadium: Lady Burra Stadium; Referee: Joe-Jordan Tripodi

7 March	Elizabeth Downs (-)	2–5	Seaford Rangers (4)	Elizabeth Downs
19:30	Nestoras 57', 74'	Report	Ellis 41'; Stevenson 52', 58'; Conway 55'; Gabrais 90+3'	Stadium: Argana Park; Referee: Rosario Iacobini

7 March	Tea Tree Gully (-)	Walkover	Adelaide Eagles (-)	Surrey Downs
19:30		Report		Stadium: Tilley Reserve

7 March	Mount Barker United (4)	3–6	Adelaide Atletico (4)	Mount Barker
20:00	Scarpantoni 35'; McGrath 44'; van der Haak 90'	Report	Burkhardt 4'; Totani 7'; Pirone 9'; Rapuano 72'; Edward 87', 87'	Stadium: Summit Sport and Recreation Park; Referee: Ethan McCormick

7 March	Vipers FC (3)	3–2	Eastern United (4)	Angle Park
20:00	Katsigiannis 23', 45+2'; Lea'alafa 51'	Report	Garcia 18'; Matija 45+3'	Stadium: Apex Football Stadium; Referee: Andrew Kite

7 March	Adelaide Omonia Cobras (3)	0–1	Modbury Jets (2)	Plympton
20:30		Report	McGregor 13'	Stadium: Pro Paint and Panel Oval; Referee: Tom Brinkworth

7 March	Western Strikers (4)	1–2 (a.e.t.)	Gawler Eagles (4)	Royal Park
20:30	Boulet 7'	Report	Seymour 33'; Sergi 109' (pen.)	Stadium: Carnegie Reserve; Referee: Gary Mooney

8 March	Pitbulls FC (-)	1–3	Adelaide Blue Eagles (3)	Brahma Lodge
18:00	Avila 63'	Report	Cappellino 18'; Isla Cacciavillani 26', 47'	Stadium: Cockburn Green; Referee: Liam Toovey

8 March	Naracoorte United (5)	0–16	The Cove (3)	Naracoorte
18:00		Report	Grant 6', 13', 17', 28'; Jaseem 20', 47'; Thompson 39', 54'; Higgins 45+1', 49'; Shaw 59'; Seidel 83'; Osland 84', 85'; Papandrea 89'; Harrison 90+3'	Stadium: Naracoorte and District Sports Centre; Referee: Nathan Butler

8 March	Ghan United (4)	2–1	Northern Demons (4)	Ferryden Park
18:00	Nikolla 25'; Orji 74'	Report	Kenneh 73'	Stadium: Ferryden Park Reserve; Referee: Daniel Faulkner

8 March	Apollo FC (5)	0–15	Adelaide Croatia Raiders (2)	Mount Gambier
18:00		Report	Matteo 5', 23', 36', 56', 58', 90'; Trimboli 8', 68', 76'; Campbell 33'; Thompson 52'; Wallace 65' (o.g.); King Byrne 71', 78', 80'	Stadium: Hastings Cunningham Reserve; Referee: Mark Michael

8 March	Gambier Centrals (5)	1–5	Adelaide Olympic (3)	Worrolong
18:30	Crossing 54'	Report	De Rosa 6'; Shearer 20'; Demasi 70', 74'; Bogdanovic 73'	Stadium: MGA Park; Referee: Zakir Hussaini

8 March	Para Hills United (-)	1–4	Adelaide University (4)	Para Hills West
19:00	Williams 56'	Report	Tsaconas 18'; Killick 27'; Lawless 55'; Hitimana 58'	Stadium: Feel Good Physio Co Stadium; Referee: Garry Powers

8 March	Pontian Eagles (3)	3–1	BOSA FC (-)	Paralowie
19:00	Kashindi 42', 52', 86' (pen.)	Report	Karakitsios 75'	Stadium: Yalumba Drive Reserve; Referee: David Alberton

8 March	Salisbury United (3)	1–2	Playford City (2)	Burton
19:00	Taylor 81'	Report	Ryan 72', 79'	Stadium: PSD Energy Park; Referee: Dion Turner

9 March	Southern Knights (-)	Walkover	West Adelaide (3)	O'Sullivan Beach
14:45		Report		Stadium: O'Sullivan Beach Sports and Community Centre

9 March	International SC (5)	0–2	Adelaide Titans (4)	Moorak
18:00		Report	Trolio 13'; Allevi 15'	Stadium: Casadio Park; Referee: Joseph Bojcevski

9 March	Para Hills East (-)	5–0	South Adelaide Panthers (3)	Modbury North
18:00	Mayol 30', 45+3', 48'; Bernardi 35'; Baxter 88'	Report		Stadium: Ladywood Reserve; Referee: Denis Palushaj

9 March	Portland Panthers (5)	0–13	Croydon Cougars (-)	Portland, Victoria
18:00		Report	Tascione 37', 59', 90+1'; Zoina 43'; Calvitto 45+1'; Tsiknis 61'; Solanke 63' (o.g.); Kekez 69', 73'; Monteleone 76', 84', 89'; Labrosciano 85'	Stadium: Friendly Society Reserve; Referee: Nathan Butler

11 March	Fulham United (3)	3–1	Port Adelaide (4)	West Beach
19:00	Ikonomopoulos 36'; Carbone 52'; Veronese 55'	Report	De Donatis 79'	Stadium: West Beach Parks Football Centre; Referee: Denis Palushaj

12 March	Noarlunga United (4)	2–4	Salisbury Inter (4)	Morphett Vale
19:00	Visser 48'; Rowe 68'	Report	Butler 7', 29'; Cameron 43'; Garside 54'	Stadium: Wilfred Taylor Reserve; Referee: Daniel Faulkner

== Second round ==
The second round of the Federation Cup was also the fourth round of the 2025 Australia Cup preliminary rounds, featuring 25 teams from the previous round and the seven teams from the National Premier League who were not drawn into the first round.

Number of teams per tier still in competition
NPL SA (2)	State League 1 (3)	State League 2 (4)	Regional (5)	Amateur (-)	Total
11 / 11	9 / 12	9 / 16	0 / 5	3 / 13	32 / 57

All times are in ACDT.

27 March	West Torrens Birkalla (2)	1–1 (a.e.t.) (5–4 p)	Adelaide City (2)	Novar Gardens
19:00	D'Arrigo 58'	Report	Kitano 90+2'	Stadium: Jack Smith Park; Referee: Tom Brinkworth
	Penalties
	Devereux (penalty scored); D'Arrigo (penalty scored); Scambiatterra (penalty scored); Welsh (penalty scored); Christofilos (penalty scored)		(penalty scored) Kitano; (penalty scored) Abetew; (penalty scored) Dawber; (penalty scored) Bressan; (penalty missed) Caraccia

28 March	Adelaide Comets (2)	3–1	Para Hills East (-)	Adelaide
19:15	Zacharakis 13', 45'; Mavrolambados 90+3'	Report	Oliver 84'	Stadium: LJ Hooker-Mile End Sports Park; Referee: David Alberton

28 March	Sturt Lions (3)	4–1	Tea Tree Gully (-)	Eden Hills
19:30	Duffy 16'; Tsarkani 72'; Sortini 81'; Silvestri 87'	Report	Williams 9'	Stadium: Karinya Reserve; Referee: Joe-Jordan Tripodi

28 March	Adelaide Hills Hawks (4)	2–1	West Adelaide (3)	Woodside
19:30	Bowering 5'; Morakis 81' (pen.)	Report	Wood 20'	Stadium: Hawks Nest; Referee: Brendan King

28 March	Modbury Jets (2)	2–1	Para Hills Knights (2)	Ridgehaven
19:30	O'Doherty Gavros 54' (pen.); Abdullahi 60'	Report	Amanda 90+4'	Stadium: Smith Partners Stadium; Referee: Christian Verdicchio

28 March	FK Beograd (2)	4–0	Adelaide Blue Eagles (3)	Woodville West
19:30	Boselli 51', 56'; Trimboli 62'; J. Konstandopoulos 83'	Report		Stadium: 1Solution Park; Referee: Daniel Cook

28 March	Gawler Eagles (4)	1–2	North Eastern MetroStars (2)	Evanston Gardens
19:30	Tasso 89'	Report	Visser 29', 40'	Stadium: Karbeethan Reserve; Referee: Mark Michael

28 March	Adelaide Croatia Raiders (2)	6–0	Elizabeth Grove (4)	Gepps Cross
19:30	Pill 3' (o.g.); Radice 11', 39'; Matteo 33'; Trimboli 42'; Campbell 67'	Report		Stadium: Croatian Sports Centre; Referee: Curtis Wordsworth

29 March	Croydon FC (2)	2–1	Salisbury Inter (4)	Regency Park
14:30	John 16'; Carle 43'	Report	Jamal 60'	Stadium: Regency Park; Referee: Rosario Iacobini

29 March	Campbelltown City (2)	2–0	Playford City (2)	Newton
14:30	A. Mullen 5'; Mori 90+6'	Report		Stadium: Steve Woodcock Sports Centre; Referee: Dion Turner

29 March	Adelaide University (4)	1–2	Adelaide Olympic (3)	North Adelaide
15:00	Kamugisha 29'	Report	Velinov 26'; Habonimana 45+2'	Stadium: University Ovals; Referee: Daniel Faulkner

29 March	Seaford Rangers (4)	2–2 (a.e.t.) (3–1 p)	Pontian Eagles (3)	Port Noarlunga South
15:00	Stevenson 71'; Conway 90+1'	Report	Katsigiannis 7'; Mutsigwa 18'	Stadium: Karingal Reserve; Referee: Gary Mooney

29 March	Croydon Cougars (-)	0–5	Ghan United (4)	Semaphore Park
		Report	Teymouri 8'; Hosseini 27'; Zamini 33'; Abbasi 73'; Orji 79'	Stadium: Trust Reserve; Referee: Denis Palushaj

29 March	The Cove (3)	2–0	Adelaide Atletico (4)	Trott Park
19:00	Higgins 27'; Osland 60'	Report		Stadium: Southern Soccer Facility; Referee: Liam Toovey

29 March	Adelaide Titans (4)	1–5	Fulham United (3)	West Beach
19:00	Allevi 89'	Report	Fusco 10'; Scalzi 19'; Dix 31'; Filsell 49' (pen.); Maio 90+2'	Stadium: West Beach Parks Football Centre; Referee: Ethan McCormick

30 March	Vipers FC (3)	0–3	Cumberland United (3)	St Clair
16:00			Rimington 58'; Swan 86', 90+5' (pen.)	Stadium: St Clair Oval; Referee: Jayden Betterman

== Third round ==
The third round of the Federation Cup was also the fifth round of the 2025 Australia Cup preliminary rounds.

Number of teams per tier still in competition
NPL SA (2)	State League 1 (3)	State League 2 (4)	Regional (5)	Amateur (-)	Total
8 / 11	5 / 12	3 / 16	0 / 5	0 / 13	16 / 57

All times are in ACST.

17 April	West Torrens Birkalla (2)	3–0	Croydon FC (2)	Novar Gardens
19:00	Blackwood 52', 73'; Conway 65'	Report		Stadium: Jack Smith Park; Referee: Daniel Faulkner

17 April	Adelaide Croatia Raiders (2)	3–2	Cumberland United (3)	Gepps Cross
19:30	Costa 17', 40'; Niyonkuru 21'	Report	Dunton 34'; Rimington 80' (pen.)	Stadium: Croatian Sports Centre; Referee: Christian Verdicchio

19 April	Fulham United (3)	3–1	Sturt Lions (3)	West Beach
14:30	Habonimana 33'; Filsell 35'; Ikonomopoulos 72'	Report	Garrett 61'	Stadium: West Beach Parks Football Centre; Referee: Denis Palushaj

19 April	Ghan United (4)	1–3	Campbelltown City (2)	Ferryden Park
14:30	Orji 25'	Report	Marino 52'; Appiah-Kubi 80', 82'	Stadium: Ferryden Park Reserve; Referee: Liam Miller

19 April	Seaford Rangers (4)	2–4	Adelaide Comets (2)	Port Noarlunga South
15:00	Stojanovic 4' (o.g.); Stevenson 27'	Report	Lobasso 9', 64'; Stojanovic 35'; Dorsi 46'	Stadium: Karingal Reserve; Referee: Garry Powers

19 April	Adelaide Hills Hawks (4)	2–0	The Cove (3)	Woodside
17:00	Morakis 31', 58'	Report		Stadium: Hawks Nest; Referee: Marc Padros

19 April	North Eastern MetroStars (2)	4–1	Modbury Jets (2)	Klemzig
18:00	Gow 16', 79'; Cittadini 66', 71'	Report	H. McCabe 46'	Stadium: T.K. Shutter Reserve; Referee: Tom Brinkworth

21 April	Adelaide Olympic (3)	0–3	FK Beograd (2)	Angle Park
15:00		Report	Niyonkuru 39'; J. Konstandopoulos 57'; Stam 73'	Stadium: Apex Football Stadium; Referee: Curtis Wordsworth

== Quarter-finals ==
The quarter-finals of the Federation Cup was also the sixth round of the 2025 Australia Cup preliminary rounds.

Number of teams per tier still in competition
NPL SA (2)	State League 1 (3)	State League 2 (4)	Regional (5)	Amateur (-)	Total
6 / 11	1 / 12	1 / 16	0 / 5	0 / 13	8 / 57

All times are in ACST.

13 May	West Torrens Birkalla (2)	0–3	Adelaide Comets (2)	Novar Gardens
19:00		Report	Dorsi 41'; Lobasso 66'; Ljujic 90+1'	Stadium: Jack Smith Park; Referee: Daniel Cook

20 May	Adelaide Croatia Raiders (2)	2–1	Adelaide Hills Hawks (4)	Gepps Cross
19:00	Costa 45'; Thompson 66'	Report	Savill 59'	Stadium: Croatian Sports Centre; Referee: Dion Turner

20 May	Campbelltown City (2)	1–3	North Eastern MetroStars (2)	Newton
19:30	Appiah-Kubi 71'	Report	Windsor 77'; Gow 89' (pen.); Visser 90+4'	Stadium: Steve Woodcock Sports Centre; Referee: Curtis Wordsworth

21 May	FK Beograd (2)	3–3 (a.e.t.) (5–4 p)	Fulham United (3)	Woodville West
19:30	J. Konstandopoulos 7' (pen.); K. Konstandopoulos 20'; Boselli 78' (pen.)		Ikonomopoulos 45'; Cavallin 63'; Dix 90' (pen.)	Stadium: 1Solution Park

== Semi-finals ==
The semi-finals of the Federation Cup was also the seventh round of the 2025 Australia Cup preliminary rounds, with the two winners qualifying for the 2025 Australia Cup.

Number of teams per tier still in competition
NPL SA (2)	State League 1 (3)	State League 2 (4)	Regional (5)	Amateur (-)	Total
4 / 11	0 / 12	0 / 16	0 / 5	0 / 13	4 / 57

All times are in ACST.

11 June	North Eastern MetroStars (2)	1–1 (a.e.t.) (3–1 p)	Adelaide Comets (2)	Gepps Cross
19:30	D'Angelo 7'	Report	Irabona 35'	Stadium: ServiceFM Stadium; Referee: Christian Verdicchio
	Penalties
	McNamara (penalty scored); Barbiero (penalty missed); Gow (penalty scored); Cittadini (penalty scored)		(penalty missed) Irabona; (penalty missed) Thomas; (penalty scored) Ikonomopoulos; (penalty missed) LoBasso

18 June	Adelaide Croatia Raiders (2)	1–0	FK Beograd (2)	Gepps Cross
19:30	Niyonkuru 90' (pen.)	Report		Stadium: ServiceFM Stadium; Referee: Regis Queffelec

== Final ==
12 July
17:00 ACST

North Eastern MetroStars	3–1	Adelaide Croatia Raiders
Visser 34'; Woodfin 35'; Windsor 76'	Report	Uwineza 45'

ServiceFM Stadium, Gepps Cross
Referee: Curtis Wordsworth

== See also ==
- 2025 Football South Australia season
