= 2009 FFSA season =

Football Federation South Australia
- Season: 2009
- Champions: MetroStars

The 2009 Football Federation South Australia season was the 103rd season of soccer in South Australia, and the fourth under the FFSA format.

== 2009 FFSA Super League ==
South Australian Super League
- Season: 2009
- Champions: Grand Final; MetroStars; Minor Premiership; MetroStars
- Relegated: Adelaide Hills Hawks; Modbury Jets
- Matches: 90
- Top goalscorer: Jason Trimboli (22 goals)
- Biggest home win: Campbelltown City 9–2 Modbury Jets (11 July 2008)
- Biggest away win: Modbury Jets 0–4 Adelaide City (3 April 2009); Modbury Jets 0–4 North Eastern MetroStars (15 May 2009); Western Strikers 1–5 North Eastern MetroStars (20 June 2009); Adelaide Raiders 0–4 North Eastern MetroStars (1 August 2009)
- Highest scoring: Campbelltown City 9–2 Modbury Jets (11 July 2008) (11 goals)

The 2009 South Australian Super League (also known as the Devine Homes Super League for sponsorship reasons) was the fourth edition of the South Australian Super League, the top level domestic association football competition in South Australia, and was the second season to use the McIntyre Final Five finals system introduced the previous year. Ten teams competed, with the two worst finishing being relegated to the 2010 Premier League. The league was won by the North Eastern MetroStars after they beat Adelaide City 1–0 in the Grand Final, becoming just the second team (apart from Adelaide City) to finish top of the league or win the Grand Final.

=== League table ===
Pos	Team	Pld	W	D	L	GF	GA	GD	Pts	Qualification or relegation
1	North Eastern MetroStars (C)	18	12	3	3	35	14	+21	39	Qualified for the 2009 FFSA Super League Finals
2	Campbelltown City	18	11	4	3	44	20	+24	37	Qualified for the 2009 FFSA Super League Finals
3	Adelaide Blue Eagles	18	9	5	4	29	22	+7	32	Qualified for the 2009 FFSA Super League Finals
4	Adelaide Raiders	18	8	5	5	30	31	−1	29	Qualified for the 2009 FFSA Super League Finals
5	Adelaide City	18	8	4	6	25	17	+8	28	Qualified for the 2009 FFSA Super League Finals
6	Adelaide Galaxy	18	7	4	7	23	25	−2	25	
7	Para Hills Knights	18	5	8	5	25	28	−3	23	
8	Western Strikers	18	4	2	12	23	35	−12	14	
9	Adelaide Hills Hawks (R)	18	3	4	11	26	35	−9	13	Relegated to the 2010 FFSA Premier League
10	Modbury Jets (R)	18	3	1	14	21	54	−33	10	Relegated to the 2010 FFSA Premier League

(C) Champions; (R) Relegated

=== Finals ===
Elimination and Qualifying Finals
2	Campbelltown City	1
3	Adelaide Blue Eagles	2
4	Adelaide Raiders	0
5	Adelaide City	1

Semifinals
1	North Eastern MetroStars	2 (6)
3	Adelaide Blue Eagles	2 (4)
2	Campbelltown City	0
5	Adelaide City	1

Preliminary Final
3	Adelaide Blue Eagles	0
5	Adelaide City	2

Grand Final
1	North Eastern MetroStars	1
5	Adelaide City	0

== 2009 FFSA Premier League ==
FFSA Premier League
- Season: 2009
- Champions: Grand Final; Cumberland United; Minor Premiership; Adelaide Cobras
- Relegated: S.A.S.I. South Adelaide Panthers
- Matches: 90
- Top goalscorer: Paul Tsoukalas (13 goals)
- Biggest home win: S.A.S.I. 5–0 Salisbury United (31 March 2009)
- Biggest away win: Salisbury United 0–5 Adelaide Olympic (14 March 2009)
- Highest scoring: S.A.S.I. 4–5 Adelaide Cobras (2 May 2009) (9 goals)

The 2009 FFSA Premier League was the fourth edition of the FFSA Premier League as the second level domestic association football competition in South Australia. 10 teams competed, all playing each other twice for a total of 18 rounds, with the top five at the end of the year qualifying for the McIntyre final five finals system to determine 1st to 5th place. The League winners (The Cobras) and Grand Final winners (Cumberland) were promoted to the 2010 FFSA Super League, and the last placed team (South Adelaide) were relegated to the 2010 FFSA State League. At the end of the season, the S.A.S.I. withdrew from the official competitions to participate in the Super League Reserves.

=== League table ===
Pos	Team	Pld	W	D	L	GF	GA	GD	Pts	Qualification or relegation
1	Adelaide Cobras (P)	18	10	4	4	42	28	+14	34	Promoted to the 2010 FFSA Super League
2	White City	18	9	4	5	33	21	+12	31	Qualified for the 2009 FFSA Premier League Finals
3	Cumberland United (C, P)	18	8	7	3	30	19	+11	31	Promoted to the 2010 FFSA Super League
4	Adelaide Comets	18	9	4	5	32	26	+6	31	Qualified for the 2009 FFSA Premier League Finals
5	Croydon Kings	18	9	2	7	31	24	+7	29	Qualified for the 2009 FFSA Premier League Finals
6	Adelaide Olympic	18	8	4	6	32	23	+9	28	
7	Port Adelaide Pirates	18	4	7	7	31	33	−2	19	
8	S.A.S.I. (R)	18	5	4	9	29	35	−6	19	Team withdrew to join Super League Reserves
9	Salisbury United	18	5	3	10	25	47	−22	18	
10	South Adelaide (R)	18	2	3	13	14	43	−29	9	Relegated to the 2010 FFSA State League

(C) Champions; (P) Promoted; (R) Relegated

=== Finals ===
Elimination and Preliminary Finals
2	White City Woodville	2
3	Cumberland United	0
4	Adelaide Comets	2
5	Croydon Kings	1

Semifinals
1	Adelaide Cobras	2
2	White City Woodville	1
3	Cumberland United	2
4	Adelaide Comets	1

Preliminary Final
2	White City Woodville	0
3	Cumberland United	1

Grand Final
1	Adelaide Cobras	1 (4)
3	Cumberland United	1 (5)

== 2009 FFSA State League ==
FFSA State League
- Season: 2009
- Champions: Grand Final; Enfield City Falcons; Minor Premiership; Enfield City Falcons
- Matches: 110
- Top goalscorer: Dayle Anderson (21 goals)
- Biggest home win: Enfield City Falcons 10–0 Gawler (11 April 2009)
- Biggest away win: Gawler 1–7 West Adelaide (4 April 2009); N.A.B. SC 0–6 West Adelaide (4 July 2009)
- Highest scoring: Enfield City Falcons 10–0 Gawler (11 April 2009)

The 2009 FFSA State League was the fourth edition of the FFSA State League as the third level domestic association football competition in South Australia. 11 teams competed, all playing each other twice for a total of 20 rounds, with the top five at the end of the year qualifying for the McIntyre final five finals system to determine 1st to 5th place. The League winners and Grand Final winners were promoted to the 2010 FFSA Premier League.

=== League table ===
Pos	Team	Pld	W	D	L	GF	GA	GD	Pts	Qualification or relegation
1	Enfield City (C, P)	20	16	3	1	62	13	+49	51	Promoted to the 2010 FFSA Premier League
2	West Adelaide (P)	20	16	1	3	63	21	+42	49	Promoted to the 2010 FFSA Premier League
3	Northern Demons	20	10	6	4	46	22	+24	36	Qualified for the 2009 FFSA State League Finals
4	Seaford Rangers	20	11	2	7	62	38	+24	35	Qualified for the 2009 FFSA State League Finals
5	Playford City	20	10	4	6	46	38	+8	34	Qualified for the 2009 FFSA State League Finals
6	Noarlunga United	20	9	4	7	33	40	−7	31	
7	N.A.B.	20	8	5	7	47	49	−2	29	
8	Port Pirie City (R)	20	5	3	12	23	45	−22	18	Disbanded at end of season
9	Western Toros	20	4	2	14	22	50	−28	14	
10	The Cove	20	3	3	14	23	47	−24	12	
11	Gawler Eagles	20	1	1	18	17	81	−64	4	

(C) Champions; (P) Promoted; (R) Relegated

=== Finals ===
Elimination and Qualifying Finals
2	West Adelaide	6
3	Northern Demons	3
4	Seaford Rangers	2
5	Playford City Patriots	1

Semifinals
1	Enfield City	2
2	West Adelaide	4
3	Northern Demons	2 (6)
4	Seaford Rangers	2 (5)

Preliminary Final
1	Enfield City	2
3	Northern Demons	1

Grand Final
1	Enfield City	2
2	West Adelaide	0

== See also ==
- 2009 FFSA Premier League
- 2009 FFSA Super League
- 2009 FFSA State League
- National Premier Leagues South Australia
- Football Federation South Australia
