= 2012 FFSA season =

Football Federation South Australia
- Season: 2012
- Champions: MetroStars

The 2012 Football Federation South Australia season was the 106th season of soccer in South Australia, and the seventh and final under the FFSA format.

== 2012 FFSA Super League ==
FFSA Super League
- Season: 2012
- Champions: Grand Final; MetroStars; Minor Premiership; Croydon Kings
- Relegated: None
- Matches: 90
- Goals: 270 (3 per match)
- Top goalscorer: Kym Harris; Michael Matricciani (12 goals each)
- Biggest home win: North Eastern MetroStars 6–2 West Torrens Birkalla (25 May 2012); West Torrens Birkalla 6–2 Campbelltown City (18 August 2012)
- Biggest away win: Adelaide Comets 0–7 Adelaide Blue Eagles (9 April 2012)
- Highest scoring: North Eastern MetroStars 6–2 West Torrens Birkalla (25 May 2012); West Torrens Birkalla 6–2 Campbelltown City (18 August 2012)
- Longest winning run: 6 games Adelaide Blue Eagles
- Longest unbeaten run: 9 games Croydon Kings
- Longest winless run: 7 games Adelaide Comets
- Longest losing run: 7 games Adelaide Comets

The 2012 FFSA Super League was the seventh and final edition of the FFSA Super League, the top level domestic association football competition in South Australia. 10 teams competed, all playing each other twice for a total of 18 rounds, with the top five at the end of the year qualifying for the McIntyre final five finals system to determine 1st to 5th place. The FFSA Super League became defunct at the end of the season, with the FFSA Premier League becoming the top level of domestic football in South Australia, consisting of all teams in the 2012 FFSA Super League, plus the top four teams from the 2012 FFSA Premier League.

=== League table ===
| Pos | Team | Pld | W | D | L | GF | GA | GD | Pts | Qualification or relegation |
|---|---|---|---|---|---|---|---|---|---|---|
| 1 | Croydon Kings | 18 | 12 | 3 | 3 | 32 | 18 | +14 | 39 | Qualified for the 2012 FFSA Super League Finals |
| 2 | Adelaide Blue Eagles | 18 | 11 | 2 | 5 | 38 | 17 | +21 | 35 | Qualified for the 2012 FFSA Super League Finals |
| 3 | North Eastern MetroStars (C) | 18 | 9 | 4 | 5 | 29 | 20 | +9 | 31 | Qualified for the 2012 FFSA Super League Finals |
| 4 | Adelaide City | 18 | 9 | 3 | 6 | 29 | 21 | +8 | 30 | Qualified for the 2012 FFSA Super League Finals |
| 5 | Adelaide Raiders | 18 | 7 | 3 | 8 | 28 | 30 | −2 | 24 | Qualified for the 2012 FFSA Super League Finals |
| 6 | Western Strikers | 18 | 7 | 2 | 9 | 25 | 27 | −2 | 23 | |
| 7 | West Torrens Birkalla | 18 | 7 | 1 | 10 | 28 | 33 | −5 | 22 | |
| 8 | Campbelltown City | 18 | 6 | 3 | 9 | 20 | 33 | −13 | 21 | |
| 9 | Enfield City | 18 | 5 | 2 | 11 | 16 | 32 | −16 | 17 | |
| 10 | Adelaide Comets | 18 | 5 | 1 | 12 | 25 | 39 | −14 | 16 | |

Source: https://websites.sportstg.com/comp_info.cgi?c=0-8365-0-192652-0&pool=1001&a=LADDER
(C) Champions

=== Finals ===
Elimination and Qualifying Finals
2 | Adelaide Blue Eagles | 0
3 | North Eastern MetroStars | 2
4 | Adelaide City | 2
5 | Adelaide Raiders | 0

Semifinals
1 | Croydon Kings | 0
3 | North Eastern MetroStars | 1
2 | Adelaide Blue Eagles | 0
4 | Adelaide City | 1

Preliminary Final
1 | Croydon Kings | 1
4 | Adelaide City | 2

Grand Final
3 | North Eastern MetroStars | 1
4 | Adelaide City | 0

== 2012 FFSA Premier League ==
FFSA Premier League
- Season: 2012
- Champions: Para Hills Knights
- Promoted: Para Hills Knights; Adelaide Cobras; Cumberland United; White City Woodville
- Matches: 90
- Top goalscorer: Aaron Phillips (12 goals)
- Biggest home win: Salisbury United 7–1 Playford City Patriots (16 June 2012)
- Biggest away win: Adelaide Olympic 1–6 Port Adelaide Pirates (18 August 2012)
- Highest scoring: Adelaide Cobras 7–4 Salisbury United (18 August 2012)

The 2012 FFSA Premier League was the seventh and final edition of the FFSA Premier League as the second level domestic association football competition in South Australia. 10 teams competed, all playing each other twice for a total of 18 rounds, with the top four at the end of the year being promoted to the 2013 National Premier Leagues South Australia, and the 5th through 10th placed teams were moved to the new FFSA State League.

=== League table ===
| Pos | Team | Pld | W | D | L | GF | GA | GD | Pts | Qualification or relegation |
|---|---|---|---|---|---|---|---|---|---|---|
| 1 | Para Hills Knights (P) | 18 | 10 | 4 | 4 | 33 | 19 | +14 | 34 | Promoted to the 2013 National Premier Leagues South Australia |
| 2 | Adelaide Cobras (P) | 18 | 10 | 4 | 4 | 32 | 20 | +12 | 34 | Promoted to the 2013 National Premier Leagues South Australia |
| 3 | Cumberland United (P) | 18 | 7 | 7 | 4 | 27 | 16 | +11 | 28 | Promoted to the 2013 National Premier Leagues South Australia |
| 4 | White City (P) | 18 | 8 | 4 | 6 | 31 | 30 | +1 | 28 | Promoted to the 2013 National Premier Leagues South Australia |
| 5 | Modbury Jets | 18 | 7 | 6 | 5 | 24 | 22 | +2 | 27 | Joined the 2013 FFSA State League |
| 6 | Port Adelaide Pirates | 18 | 7 | 4 | 7 | 39 | 29 | +10 | 25 | Joined the 2013 FFSA State League |
| 7 | Playford City | 18 | 6 | 6 | 6 | 26 | 32 | −6 | 24 | Joined the 2013 FFSA State League |
| 8 | South Adelaide | 18 | 7 | 1 | 10 | 30 | 36 | −6 | 22 | Joined the 2013 FFSA State League |
| 9 | Adelaide Olympic | 18 | 5 | 4 | 9 | 20 | 38 | −18 | 19 | Joined the 2013 FFSA State League |
| 10 | Salisbury United | 18 | 1 | 4 | 13 | 20 | 40 | −20 | 7 | Joined the 2013 FFSA State League |

(P) Promoted

== 2012 FFSA State League ==
FFSA State League
- Season: 2012
- Champions: West Adelaide
- Promoted: All
- Matches: 90
- Top goalscorer: Sam Bowman (17 goals)
- Biggest home win: Adelaide Hills 9–1 N.A.B. SC (11 August 2012)
- Biggest away win: Gawler 1–11 Seaford Rangers (26 May 2012)
- Highest scoring: Gawler 1–11 Seaford Rangers (26 May 2012)

The 2012 FFSA State League was the seventh and final edition of the FFSA State League as the third level domestic association football competition in South Australia. 10 teams competed, all playing each other twice for a total of 18 rounds. At the end of the season N.A.B. SC disbanded, the other nine teams were all promoted to the second division of South Australian football and were joined by the bottom six teams from the FFSA Super League to form a new second tier competition, which had adopted the name "FFSA State League". The new competition was to be run parallel with the other second divisions of state level football around Australia.

=== League table ===
| Pos | Team | Pld | W | D | L | GF | GA | GD | Pts | Qualification or relegation |
|---|---|---|---|---|---|---|---|---|---|---|
| 1 | West Adelaide (P) | 18 | 15 | 0 | 3 | 67 | 21 | +46 | 45 | Promoted to the 2013 FFSA State League |
| 2 | Adelaide Hills Hawks (P) | 18 | 13 | 3 | 2 | 60 | 20 | +40 | 42 | Promoted to the 2013 FFSA State League |
| 3 | The Cove (P) | 18 | 12 | 4 | 2 | 42 | 19 | +23 | 40 | Promoted to the 2013 FFSA State League |
| 4 | Northern Demons (P) | 18 | 12 | 2 | 4 | 42 | 22 | +20 | 38 | Promoted to the 2013 FFSA State League |
| 5 | Western Toros (P) | 18 | 7 | 4 | 7 | 34 | 32 | +2 | 25 | Promoted to the 2013 FFSA State League |
| 6 | Noarlunga United (P) | 18 | 7 | 2 | 9 | 33 | 30 | +3 | 23 | Promoted to the 2013 FFSA State League |
| 7 | Seaford Rangers (P) | 18 | 4 | 3 | 11 | 33 | 41 | −8 | 15 | Promoted to the 2013 FFSA State League |
| 8 | N.A.B. | 18 | 3 | 5 | 10 | 35 | 44 | −9 | 14 | Disbanded at end of season and were replaced |
| 9 | Gawler Eagles (P) | 18 | 2 | 2 | 14 | 17 | 89 | −72 | 8 | Promoted to the 2013 FFSA State League |
| 10 | Sturt Lions (P) | 18 | 2 | 1 | 15 | 15 | 60 | −45 | 7 | Promoted to the 2013 FFSA State League |

(P) Promoted

== 2012 Women's Premier League ==
Women's Premier League
- Season: 2012
- Premiers: Adelaide City FC

The highest tier domestic football competition in South Australia for women was known for sponsorship reasons as the Adelaide Airport Women's Premier League. The 10 teams played a double round-robin for a total of 18 games.

| Pos | Team | Pld | W | D | L | GF | GA | GD | Pts |
|---|---|---|---|---|---|---|---|---|---|
| 1 | Adelaide City (C) | 18 | 15 | 1 | 2 | 64 | 9 | +55 | 46 |
| 2 | Adelaide University | 18 | 15 | 1 | 2 | 85 | 21 | +64 | 46 |
| 3 | Metro United | 18 | 14 | 2 | 2 | 78 | 13 | +65 | 44 |
| 4 | Fulham United | 18 | 11 | 2 | 5 | 70 | 39 | +31 | 35 |
| 5 | Cumberland United | 18 | 7 | 3 | 8 | 49 | 34 | +15 | 24 |
| 6 | Para Hills Knights | 18 | 6 | 4 | 8 | 29 | 24 | +5 | 22 |
| 7 | FFSA U14/15s | 18 | 6 | 0 | 12 | 41 | 70 | −29 | 18 |
| 8 | Flinders Flames | 18 | 3 | 3 | 12 | 15 | 62 | −47 | 12 |
| 9 | Western Toros | 18 | 3 | 2 | 13 | 28 | 91 | −63 | 11 |
| 10 | Sturt Marion | 18 | 0 | 1 | 17 | 13 | 109 | −96 | 1 |

Source: sportstg.com
Rules for classification: 1) points; 2) goal difference; 3) number of goals scored.
(C) Champions

== See also ==
- 2012 FFSA Premier League
- 2012 FFSA Super League
- 2012 FFSA State League
- National Premier Leagues South Australia
- Football Federation South Australia
