= 2008 FFSA season =

Football Federation South Australia
- Season: 2008
- Champions: Adelaide City

The 2008 Football Federation South Australia season was the 102nd season of soccer in South Australia, and the third under the FFSA format.

== 2008 FFSA Super League ==
South Australian Super League
- Season: 2008
- Champions: Grand Final; Adelaide City; Minor Premiership; Adelaide City
- Relegated: White City; Croydon Kings
- Matches: 90
- Biggest home win: Adelaide Raiders 5–0 Adelaide Blue Eagles (17 May 2008)
- Biggest away win: Croydon Kings 0–6 North Eastern MetroStars (26 July 2008)
- Highest scoring: Adelaide City 4–3 Adelaide Raiders (26 May 2010) (7 goals)

The 2008 South Australian Super League was the third edition of the South Australian Super League, the top level domestic association football competition in South Australia, and was the first season to use a finals system, with the top five teams in the league progressing to the finals. The number of teams relegated to the South Australian Premier League also increased from one to two. The league was won by Adelaide City after they beat the North Eastern MetroStars 2–0 in the Grand Final.

=== League table ===
Pos	Team	Pld	W	D	L	GF	GA	GD	Pts	Qualification or relegation
1	Adelaide City (C)	18	12	1	5	33	17	+16	37	Qualification for Finals
2	North Eastern MetroStars	18	10	4	4	36	16	+20	34	Qualification for Finals
3	Campbelltown City	18	8	5	5	23	21	+2	29	Qualification for Finals
4	Para Hills Knights	18	8	4	6	28	25	+3	28	Qualification for Finals
5	Adelaide Raiders	18	6	7	5	30	22	+8	25	Qualification for Finals
6	Adelaide Galaxy	18	7	3	8	31	30	+1	24	
7	Modbury Jets	18	6	4	8	20	26	−6	22	
8	Adelaide Blue Eagles	18	5	6	7	17	20	−3	21	
9	White City (R)	18	6	2	10	20	30	−10	20	Relegation to FFSA Premier League
10	Croydon Kings (R)	18	2	4	12	15	46	−31	10	Relegation to FFSA Premier League

(C) Champions; (R) Relegated

=== Finals ===
Elimination and Qualifying Finals
2	North Eastern MetroStars	3
3	Campbelltown City	0
4	Para Hills Knights	2
5	Adelaide Raiders	3

Semifinals
1	Adelaide City	1
2	North Eastern MetroStars	2
3	Campbelltown City	3
4	Adelaide Raiders	2

Preliminary Final
1	Adelaide City	1
3	Campbelltown City	0

Grand Final
1	Adelaide City	2
2	North Eastern MetroStars	0

== 2008 FFSA Premier League ==
FFSA Premier League
- Season: 2008
- Champions: Grand Final; Adelaide Hills; Minor Premiership; Adelaide Hills
- Relegated: Enfield City; Noarlunga United
- Matches: 90
- Biggest home win: Adelaide Hills 7–1 Adelaide Olympic (16 August 2008)
- Biggest away win: Noarlunga United 1–6 Adelaide Olympic (15 March 2008)
- Highest scoring: Adelaide Comets 6–2 South Adelaide (31 May 2008); Adelaide Hills 7–1 Adelaide Olympic (16 August 2008) (8 goals)

The 2008 FFSA Premier League was the third edition of the FFSA Premier League as the second level domestic association football competition in South Australia. 10 teams competed, all playing each other twice for a total of 18 rounds, with the top five at the end of the year qualifying for the McIntyre final five finals system to determine 1st to 5th place. The League winners and second placers were promoted to the 2009 FFSA Super League, and the bottom two placed teams relegated to the 2009 FFSA State League.

=== League table ===
Pos	Team	Pld	W	D	L	GF	GA	GD	Pts	Promotion, qualification or relegation
1	Adelaide Hills Hawks (C, P)	18	11	3	4	39	15	+24	36	Promotion to FFSA Super League and qualification for Finals
2	Western Strikers (P)	18	10	4	4	36	20	+16	34	Promotion to FFSA Super League and qualification for Finals
3	Adelaide Comets	18	9	3	6	38	27	+11	30	Qualification for Finals
4	Port Adelaide Pirates	18	7	5	6	25	23	+2	26	Qualification for Finals
5	Adelaide Cobras	18	7	5	6	28	31	−3	26	Qualification for Finals
6	Adelaide Olympic	18	8	2	8	33	37	−4	26	
7	Cumberland United	18	6	4	8	20	23	−3	22	
8	South Adelaide	18	6	3	9	27	41	−14	21	
9	Enfield City (R)	18	5	5	8	21	29	−8	20	Relegation to FFSA State League
10	Noarlunga United (R)	18	3	2	13	20	41	−21	11	Relegation to FFSA State League

(C) Champions; (P) Promoted; (R) Relegated

=== Finals ===
Elimination and Preliminary Finals
2	Western Strikers	5
3	Adelaide Comets	1
4	Port Adelaide Pirates	0 (3)
5	Adelaide Cobras	0 (4)

Semifinals
1	Adelaide Hills	5 (9)
2	Western Strikers	5 (8)
3	Adelaide Comets	0
5	Adelaide Cobras	1

Preliminary Final
2	Western Strikers	4
5	Adelaide Cobras	3

Grand Final
1	Adelaide Hills	2 (6)
2	Western Strikers	2 (5)

== 2008 FFSA State League ==
FFSA State League
- Season: 2008
- Promoted: Salisbury United; S.A.S.I.
- Matches: 90
- Biggest home win: N.A.B. 8–2 Port Pirie City (29 April 2008)
- Biggest away win: 5 goals (3 times)
- Highest scoring: N.A.B. 8–2 Port Pirie City (29 April 2008) (10 goals)

The 2008 FFSA State League was the third edition of the FFSA State League as the third level domestic association football competition in South Australia. 10 teams competed, all playing each other twice for a total of 18 rounds. The League winners and second placers were promoted to the 2009 FFSA Premier League.

=== League table ===
Pos	Team	Pld	W	D	L	GF	GA	GD	Pts	Promotion or qualification
1	Salisbury United (P)	18	13	1	4	49	30	+19	40	Promotion to FFSA Premier League and qualification for Finals
2	S.A.S.I. (P)	18	12	3	3	60	29	+31	39	Promotion to FFSA Premier League and qualification for Finals
3	West Adelaide (C)	18	12	2	4	58	22	+36	38	Qualification for Finals
4	N.A.B.	18	12	2	4	45	33	+12	38	Qualification for Finals
5	Playford City	18	9	5	4	39	24	+15	32	Qualification for Finals
6	Northern Demons	18	9	4	5	32	26	+6	31	
7	Gawler Eagles	18	4	1	13	25	45	−20	13	
8	Seaford Rangers	18	3	3	12	15	42	−27	12	
9	Western Toros	18	3	1	14	22	47	−25	10	
10	Port Pirie City	18	1	2	15	18	65	−47	5	

(C) Champions; (P) Promoted

=== Finals ===
Elimination and Preliminary Finals
2	S.A.S.I.	2
3	West Adelaide	4
4	N.A.B.	1
5	Playford City Patriots	2

Semifinals
1	Salisbury United	2
3	West Adelaide	0
2	S.A.S.I.	3
5	Playford City Patriots	2

Preliminary Final
2	S.A.S.I.	0
3	West Adelaide	6

Grand Final
1	Salisbury United	2
3	West Adelaide	5

== See also ==
- 2008 FFSA Premier League
- 2008 FFSA Super League
- 2008 FFSA State League
- National Premier Leagues South Australia
- Football Federation South Australia
