= 2010 FFSA season =

Football Federation South Australia
- Season: 2010
- Champions: Adelaide City

The 2010 Football Federation South Australia season was the 104th season of soccer in South Australia, and the fifth under the FFSA format.

== 2010 FFSA Super League ==
South Australian Super League
- Season: 2010
- Champions: Grand Final; Adelaide City; Minor Premiership; North Eastern MetroStars
- Relegated: Adelaide Cobras; Cumberland United
- Matches: 90
- Top goalscorer: Chad Bugeja (13 goals)
- Biggest home win: Campbelltown City 6–1 Western Strikers (13 August 2010)
- Biggest away win: Cumberland United 0–5 Para Hills Knights (7 August 2010); Adelaide Cobras 2–7 North Eastern MetroStars (8 May 2010)
- Highest scoring: Adelaide Cobras 2–7 North Eastern MetroStars (8 May 2010) (9 goals)

The 2010 South Australian Super League was the fifth edition of the South Australian Super League, the top level domestic association football competition in South Australia. 10 teams competed, all playing each other twice for a total of 18 rounds, with the top five at the end of the year qualifying for the finals system to determine 1st to 5th place. At the end of the season, the bottom two placed teams were relegated to the 2011 FFSA Premier League.

=== League table ===
Pos	Team	Pld	W	D	L	GF	GA	GD	Pts	Qualification or relegation
1	North Eastern MetroStars	18	11	4	3	37	19	+18	37	Qualified for the 2010 FFSA Super League Finals
2	Para Hills Knights	18	9	5	4	46	15	+31	32	Qualified for the 2010 FFSA Super League Finals
3	Adelaide City (C)	18	10	2	6	28	27	+1	32	Qualified for the 2010 FFSA Super League Finals
4	Adelaide Blue Eagles	18	9	4	5	40	25	+15	31	Qualified for the 2010 FFSA Super League Finals
5	Campbelltown City	18	8	5	5	33	23	+10	29	Qualified for the 2010 FFSA Super League Finals
6	Adelaide Galaxy	18	5	7	6	21	24	−3	22	
7	Western Strikers	18	5	7	6	33	38	−5	22	
8	Adelaide Raiders	18	4	6	8	17	23	−6	18	
9	Adelaide Cobras (R)	18	5	2	11	23	39	−16	17	Relegated to the 2011 FFSA Premier League
10	Cumberland United (R)	18	1	4	13	17	40	−23	7	Relegated to the 2011 FFSA Premier League

(C) Champions; (R) Relegated

=== Finals ===
Elimination and Qualifying Finals
2	Para Hills Knights	0
3	Adelaide City	1
4	Adelaide Blue Eagles	1
5	Campbelltown City	0

Semifinals
1	North Eastern MetroStars	0
3	Adelaide City	1
2	Para Hills Knights	1
4	Adelaide Blue Eagles	3

Preliminary final
1	North Eastern MetroStars	0
4	Adelaide Blue Eagles	1

Grand final
3	Adelaide City	1
4	Adelaide Blue Eagles	0

== 2010 FFSA Premier League ==
FFSA Premier League
- Season: 2010
- Champions: Grand Final; Croydon Kings; Minor Premiership; Modbury Jets
- Relegated: Salisbury United; Playford City Patriots
- Matches: 90
- Top goalscorer: Shane Pearce (23 goals)
- Biggest home win: 5–0 (3 times)
- Biggest away win: Enfield City Falcons 1–5 Port Adelaide Pirates (15 May 2011)
- Highest scoring: 6 goals (7 times)

The 2010 FFSA Premier League was the fifth edition of the FFSA Premier League as the second level domestic association football competition in South Australia. 10 teams competed, all playing each other twice for a total of 18 rounds, with the top five at the end of the year qualifying for the McIntyre final five finals system to determine 1st to 5th place. The League winners (Modbury) and Grand Final winners (Croydon) were promoted to the 2011 FFSA Super League, and the 9th and 10th placed teams were relegated to the 2011 FFSA State League.

=== League table ===
Pos	Team	Pld	W	D	L	GF	GA	GD	Pts	Qualification or relegation
1	Modbury Jets (P)	18	12	3	3	46	22	+24	39	Promoted to the 2011 FFSA Super League
2	Croydon Kings (C, P)	18	9	5	4	31	21	+10	32	Promoted to the 2011 FFSA Super League
3	Enfield City	18	7	6	5	29	27	+2	27	Qualified for the 2010 FFSA Premier League Finals
4	Adelaide Comets	18	8	2	8	33	32	+1	26	Qualified for the 2010 FFSA Premier League Finals
5	Port Adelaide Pirates	18	6	7	5	30	25	+5	25	Qualified for the 2010 FFSA Premier League Finals
6	Adelaide Olympic	18	6	6	6	30	27	+3	24	
7	White City	18	5	7	6	23	25	−2	22	
8	Adelaide Hills Hawks	18	4	6	8	30	34	−4	18	
9	Salisbury United (R)	18	6	2	10	22	34	−12	20	Relegated to the 2011 FFSA State League
10	West Adelaide (R)	18	5	1	12	17	44	−27	16	Relegated to the 2011 FFSA State League

(C) Champions; (P) Promoted; (R) Relegated

=== Finals ===
Elimination and Qualifying Finals
2	Croydon Kings	2
3	Enfield City Falcons	0
4	Adelaide Comets	4
5	Port Adelaide Pirates	0

Semifinals
1	Modbury Jets	2
2	Croydon Kings	1
3	Enfield City Falcons	1
4	Adelaide Comets	2

Preliminary final
2	Croydon Kings	1
4	Adelaide Comets	0

Grand final
1	Modbury Jets	1
2	Croydon Kings	2

== 2010 FFSA State League ==
FFSA State League
- Season: 2010
- Champions: Grand Final; Playford City Patriots; Minor Premiership; Noarlunga United
- Matches: 110
- Top goalscorer: Samuel Farncombe (21 goals each)
- Biggest home win: Playford City Patriots 6–0 Seaford Rangers (14 August 2010)
- Biggest away win: The Cove 0–5 Playford City Patriots (26 June 2010)
- Highest scoring: Playford City Patriots 6–2 Gawler (12 June 2010)

The 2010 FFSA State League was the fifth edition of the FFSA State League as the third level domestic association football competition in South Australia. 9 teams competed, all playing each other twice for a total of 16 rounds, with the top five at the end of the year qualifying for the McIntyre final five finals system to determine 1st to 5th place. The League winners and Grand Final winners were promoted to the 2011 FFSA Premier League.

=== League table ===
Pos	Team	Pld	W	D	L	GF	GA	GD	Pts	Qualification or relegation
1	Noarlunga United (P)	16	10	5	1	35	15	+20	35	Promoted to the 2011 FFSA Premier League
2	Playford City (C, P)	16	9	3	4	41	17	+24	30	Promoted to the 2011 FFSA Premier League
3	Northern Demons	16	8	6	2	27	20	+7	30	Qualified for the 2010 FFSA State League Finals
4	N.A.B.	16	6	5	5	33	28	+5	23	Qualified for the 2010 FFSA State League Finals
5	Seaford Rangers	16	7	2	7	26	31	−5	23	Qualified for the 2010 FFSA State League Finals
6	Gawler Eagles	16	5	3	8	22	29	−7	18	
7	Western Toros	16	5	2	9	33	43	−10	17	
8	South Adelaide	16	3	5	8	25	31	−6	14	
9	The Cove	16	2	3	11	18	46	−28	9	

(C) Champions; (P) Promoted

=== Finals ===
Elimination and Qualifying Finals
2	Playford City Patriots	1
3	Northern Demons	0
4	N.A.B.	1
5	Seaford Rangers	3

Semifinals
1	Noarlunga United	0
2	Playford City Patriots	1
3	Northern Demons	2 (4)
5	Seaford Rangers	2 (5)

Preliminary final
1	Noarlunga United	3
5	Seaford Rangers	1

Grand final
1	Noarlunga United	3
2	Playford City Patriots	6

== See also ==
- 2010 FFSA Premier League
- 2010 FFSA Super League
- 2010 FFSA State League
- National Premier Leagues South Australia
- Football Federation South Australia
