= 2007 FFSA season =

Football Federation South Australia
- Season: 2007
- Champions: Adelaide City

The 2007 Football Federation South Australia season was the 101st season of soccer in South Australia, and the second under the FFSA format.

== 2007 FFSA Super League ==
South Australian Super League
- Season: 2007
- Champions: Adelaide City
- Relegated: Cumberland United
- Matches: 90
- Top goalscorer: Damian Mori (13 goals)
- Biggest home win: Adelaide Galaxy 6–0 Modbury Jets (24 March 2007)
- Biggest away win: Cumberland United 0–5 Campbelltown City (5 May 2007)
- Highest scoring: Campbelltown City 4–5 White City (8 September 2007) (9 goals)

The 2007 South Australian Super League was the second season of the South Australian Super League, the top level domestic association football competition in South Australia. It was contested by 10 teams in a single 18 round league format, each team playing all of their opponents twice.

Pos	Team	Pld	W	D	L	GF	GA	GD	Pts	Relegation
1	Adelaide City (C)	18	14	3	1	49	17	+32	45	
2	Adelaide Raiders	18	8	6	4	27	21	+6	30	
3	Campbelltown City	18	8	5	5	32	27	+5	29	
4	North Eastern MetroStars	18	7	4	7	32	24	+8	25	
5	Adelaide Galaxy	18	6	6	6	32	34	−2	24	
6	Para Hills Knights	18	7	3	8	32	37	−5	24	
7	White City	18	5	4	9	33	41	−8	19	
8	Modbury Jets	18	5	4	9	23	34	−11	19	
9	Adelaide Blue Eagles	18	4	6	8	20	23	−3	18	
10	Cumberland United (R)	18	4	3	11	16	38	−22	15	Relegation to FFSA Premier League

(C) Champions; (R) Relegated

== 2007 FFSA Premier League ==
FFSA Premier League
- Season: 2007
- Promoted: Croydon Kings
- Relegated: Playford City Patriots; Northern Demons
- Matches: 90
- Biggest home win: Adelaide Olympic 8–1 Playford City Patriots (2 June 2007)
- Biggest away win: Northern Demons 1–6 Adelaide Hills (28 April 2007)
- Highest scoring: Adelaide Olympic 8–1 Playford City Patriots (2 June 2007) (9 goals)

The 2007 FFSA Premier League was the second edition of the FFSA Premier League as the second level domestic association football competition in South Australia. 10 teams competed, all playing each other twice for a total of 18 rounds, with the League winners promoted to the 2008 FFSA Super League, and the bottom two placed teams were relegated to the 2008 FFSA State League.

Pos	Team	Pld	W	D	L	GF	GA	GD	Pts	Promotion or relegation
1	Croydon Kings (C, P)	18	12	4	2	39	13	+26	40	Promotion to FFSA Super League
2	Enfield City	18	11	4	3	41	17	+24	37	
3	Western Strikers	18	9	6	3	29	21	+8	33	
4	Adelaide Olympic	18	9	5	4	41	19	+22	32	
5	Adelaide Hills Hawks	18	8	4	6	40	28	+12	28	
6	Port Adelaide Pirates	18	7	6	5	27	18	+9	27	
7	Adelaide Cobras	18	5	3	10	24	39	−15	18	
8	South Adelaide	18	5	3	10	18	33	−15	18	
9	Playford City (R)	18	3	3	12	21	51	−30	12	Relegation to FFSA State League
10	Northern Demons (R)	18	1	2	15	18	59	−41	5	Relegation to FFSA State League

(C) Champions; (P) Promoted; (R) Relegated

== 2007 FFSA State League ==
FFSA State League
- Season: 2007
- Promoted: Adelaide Comets; Noarlunga United
- Matches: 84
- Biggest home win: Adelaide Comets 9–0 Gawler (12 May 2007)
- Biggest away win: Port Pirie City 0–8 Adelaide Comets (14 April 2007); Seaford Rangers 0–8 Adelaide Comets (28 April 2007)
- Highest scoring: 9 goals (3 times)

The 2007 FFSA State League was the second edition of the FFSA State League as the third level domestic association football competition in South Australia. 8 teams competed, all playing each other three times for a total of 21 rounds. The League winners and second placers were promoted to the 2008 FFSA Premier League.

Pos	Team	Pld	W	D	L	GF	GA	GD	Pts	Promotion
1	Adelaide Comets (C, P)	21	16	4	1	80	18	+62	52	Promotion to FFSA Premier League
2	Noarlunga United (P)	21	16	3	2	59	23	+36	51	Promotion to FFSA Premier League
3	N.A.B.	21	8	9	4	37	28	+9	33	
4	Port Pirie City	21	9	5	7	45	39	+6	32	
5	Western Toros	21	7	7	7	50	43	+7	28	
6	Salisbury United	21	6	4	11	38	45	−7	22	
7	Gawler Eagles	21	3	1	17	26	84	−58	10	
8	Seaford Rangers	21	1	3	17	19	74	−55	6	

(C) Champions; (P) Promoted

== See also ==
- 2007 FFSA Premier League
- 2007 FFSA Super League
- 2007 FFSA State League
- National Premier Leagues South Australia
- Football Federation South Australia
