= FFSA Super League =

- Founded: 2005
- First season: 2006
- Folded: 2012
- Country: Australia
- Number of clubs: 10
- Level on pyramid: 2
- Relegation to: FFSA Premier League
- Most championships: Adelaide City; MetroStars (2 titles each)
- Most premierships: Adelaide City; MetroStars (3 titles each)

The FFSA Super League was the highest state-level soccer competition in South Australia between 2006 and 2012. Prior to the 2006 season, the highest level competition in South Australia was the SASF Premier League. Due to the manifestation of a new governing body, Football Federation Australia the SASF ceased operations. Nationally, it was one grade lower than the A-League. It was conducted by the Football Federation of South Australia (FFSA), the state's governing body. Each season the bottom two Super League clubs were relegated to the FFSA Premier League. The final champions in 2012 where the Adelaide Blue Eagles.

== League disbandment ==
In 2012 it was announced that the FFSA Super League would become defunct and that the second tier league named FFSA Premier League would become the top tier of South Australian football. It was decided that the new Premier League would consist of 14 teams. All 10 clubs from the Super League and the 4 top placed sides from the 2012 Premier League table would make up the new competition.

== 2012 Super League clubs ==
Team	Coach	Home Ground	Location	Founded
Adelaide Blue Eagles	Vojo Gluscevic	Marden Sports Complex	Marden	1958
Adelaide City	Damian Mori	Adelaide City Park	Oakden	1946
Adelaide Comets	Emir Tarabar	Santos Stadium	Mile End	1994
Adelaide Raiders	Branko Milosevic	Croatian Sports Centre	Gepps Cross	1952
Campbelltown City	Maurice Natale	Newton Sportsground	Newton	1963
Croydon Kings	Mark Brazzale	Polonia Reserve	Croydon Park	1950
Enfield City	Tom Totsikas	Rushworth Reserve	Blair Athol	1946
MetroStars	Rick Cerracchio	T.K. Shutter Reserve	Klemzig	1994
Western Strikers	Frank Tibaldi	Carnegie Reserve	Royal Park	1998
WT Birkalla	Sergio Melta	Camden Sports Complex	Novar Gardens	1933

== Champions and premiers ==
=== Finals series ===
Year	Champions	Grand final score	Runner-up
2006	not applicable (Note: Final Series was not introduced until 2008.)		
2007	not applicable		
2008	Adelaide City	2–0	MetroStars
2009	MetroStars	1–0	Adelaide City
2010	Adelaide City	1–0	Adelaide Blue Eagles
2011	Adelaide Blue Eagles	0–0 (6–5 (pen.))	Adelaide City
2012	MetroStars	1–0	Adelaide City

=== League winners ===
Year	Minor premiers	Premiers points	Runners-up points	Runner-up
2006	Adelaide City	38	29	Adelaide Galaxy
2007	Adelaide City	45	30	Adelaide Raiders
2008	Adelaide City	37	34	MetroStars
2009	MetroStars	39	37	Campbelltown City
2010	MetroStars	37	32	Para Hills
2011	MetroStars	44	43	Adelaide City
2012	Croydon Kings	39	35	Adelaide Blue Eagles
