= Nevi Gebreselasie =

Eritrean footballer

Personal information
- Full name: Nebi Gebremeskel Gebreselasie
- Date of birth: 16 April 1990 (age 36)
- Place of birth: Asmara, Eritrea
- Position: Defender

Team information
- Current team: Whit City

Senior career*
Years	Team	Apps	(Gls)
2011	Western Strikers	3	(0)
2011–2013	White City Woodville	24	(8)
2013	Adelaide Cobras	6	(0)
2014	Adelaide Olympic	19	(4)
2016	Northern Demons	10	(4)

International career^{‡}
2009	Eritrea	?	(?)
- * Club domestic league appearances and goals as of 30 August 2013 ‡ National team caps and goals as of 21 September 2011

Nebi Gebreselasie is an Eritrean footballer who last played for Adelaide Cobras.

== Club career ==
In 2011, he signed with FFSA Super League club Western Strikers after being granted refugee status by the Australian government. He later signed for FFSA Premier League side White City Woodville scoring 3 goals in 5 games.

== International career ==
He played in the 2006 African Nation cup U17 in Togo 2009 CECAFA Cup in Kenya, appearing in the 2–1 group match defeat to Rwanda.

== Personal life ==
Whilst competing in the 2009 CECAFA Cup in Kenya he was part of the Eritrea national football team which failed to return home after competing in the regional tournament in Nairobi. After receiving political asylum from the Australian government, the team moved to Adelaide, Australia.
