= 2025 Federation Cup =

The 2025 Federation Cup may refer to:

- 2025 Nigeria Federation Cup, football tournament
- 2025 FSA Federation Cup, or the Australia Cup South Australian preliminary rounds soccer competition
- 2025 Copa Federación de España, or the Copa RFEF Spanish football competition

== See also ==
- Federation Cup (disambiguation)
