= Shogo Yoshikawa =

Japanese footballer

Shogo Yoshikawa 吉川 翔梧
Personal information
- Full name: Shogo Yoshikawa
- Date of birth: April 8, 1995 (age 31)
- Place of birth: Kamagaya, Chiba, Japan
- Height: 1.70 m (5 ft 7 in)
- Position: Midfielder

Team information
- Current team: Campbelltown City

Youth career
- 2011–2013: Obihiro Kita High School

Senior career*
Years	Team	Apps	(Gls)
2014–2016	Zweigen Kanazawa	3	(0)
2016	→ Vanraure Hachinohe (loan)	9	(2)
2017–2020	Vanraure Hachinohe	24	(2)
2020–2023	FK Banga Gargždai	74	(8)
2023–	Campbelltown City	40	(3)
- * Club domestic league appearances and goals as of 9 September 2024

Shogo Yoshikawa (吉川 翔梧, Yoshikawa Shōgo; born April 8, 1995) is a Japanese football player who plays as a midfielder for Campbelltown City.

== Playing career ==
Shogo Yoshikawa played for Zweigen Kanazawa from 2014 to 2015. In 2016, he moved to Vanraure Hachinohe.

In February 2023, Yoshikawa signed for NPS South Australia club Campbelltown City following a three-year spell in Lithuania with FK Banga Gargždai.

== Career statistics ==
As of 5 January 2018.

Appearances and goals by club, season and competition
Club	Season	League			Emperor's Cup		Total	
Club	Season	Division	Apps	Goals	Apps	Goals	Apps	Goals
Zweigen Kanazawa	2014	J3 League	3	0	0	0	3	0
Zweigen Kanazawa	2015	J2 League	0	0	1	0	1	0
Vanraure Hachinohe	2016	JFL	9	2	0	0	9	2
Vanraure Hachinohe	2017	JFL	24	2	3	0	27	2
Career total			36	4	4	0	40	4
