= Federation Cup =

Federation Cup or Fed Cup is the former name of the premier world team competition in women's tennis.

Federation Cup may also refer to:

- Capital Football Federation Cup, an Australian territory-based association football tournament
- Federation Cup (Bangladesh)
- Federation Cup (India), an association football tournament
- Federation Cup (Nigeria football), an association football tournament in Lagos
- Federation Cup (United Arab Emirates), an association football tournament
- Football SA Federation Cup, an Australian state-based association football tournament
- Kuwait Federation Cup
- Lebanese Federation Cup
- Saudi Federation Cup
- South Asian Football Federation Cup
- Spanish Federation Cup
- Turkish Federation Cup
- USSR Federation Cup
