= Elizabeth Downs, South Australia =

Elizabeth Downs
- Suburb
- Coordinates: 34.69906°S 138.69303°E
- Country: Australia
- State: South Australia
- City: Adelaide
- LGA: City of Playford
- Location: 30 km (19 mi) north of Adelaide city centre

Government
  - State electorate: Elizabeth
  - Federal division: Spence

Population
  - Total: 5,160 (SAL 2021)
- Postcode: 5113
Suburbs around Elizabeth Downs
Smithfield	Blakeview	Craigmore
Elizabeth North	Elizabeth Downs	Craigmore
Elizabeth North	Elizabeth Park	Craigmore

Elizabeth Downs is a northern suburb of Adelaide, South Australia in the City of Playford. It is east of Main North Road, bounded by Main North Road, Uley Road, Adams Road, Yorktown Road and Garlick Road. The suburb contains two government primary schools and a local shopping centre. Craigmore High School is just outside the northern boundary, and a larger shopping centre on the other side of Main North Road. It also has a tavern with bars, bistro and bottle shop.

== Open space ==
The Argana Park sports precinct in the southwest of the suburb is home to football, rugby league, cricket and netball clubs. More playing fields in the northeastern corner of the suburb include a local soccer club and more cricket. Smith Creek linear park separates these from the rest of the suburb. There is a linear reserve along the easement for a major water pipe, the Barossa Trunk Main, running roughly north–south above ground through Elizabeth Downs. There is also a buffer reserve along Main North Road.
