= N.A.B. SC =

N.A.B.
- Full name: Norwood All Blacks Soccer Club
- Nickname: Demons
- Founded: 1981
- Dissolved: 2012
Home colours	Away colours

Norwood All Blacks Soccer Club, officially abbreviated to N.A.B., was a soccer club in Adelaide, South Australia. The club was established in 1989 and was based at Athelstone Recreation Reserve in the Adelaide suburb of Athelstone, South Australia. Eastern United FC was established upon the collapse of the N.A.B. SC.
