= Cumberland United FC =

Australian association football club

Cumberland United
- Full name: Cumberland United Football Club
- Nickname: Foxes
- Founded: 1943; 83 years ago
- Ground: A.A. Bailey Reserve
- Capacity: 2500
- Chairman: Steve Kidd
- Manager: Phil Stubbins
- League: SA State League 1
- 2026: 7th of 12
- Website: http://www.cumberlandunited.com.au
Home colours	Away colours

Cumberland United FC is an Australian soccer club based in Adelaide, South Australia. The club competes in the National Premier League South Australia, the second-tier of Australian soccer under the top-flight, A-League. Their home ground is AA Bailey Reserve in the inner southern suburb of Clarence Gardens, adjacent to Cumberland Park.

== History ==
Cumberland United is one of the oldest soccer clubs in South Australia. The club first appeared in 1941 fielding junior teams in the local intermediate league. Their first league game in the intermediate league was against South Adelaide on Saturday 10 May 1941. The result was a 9–0 victory for Cumberland.

Cumberland's first senior game was on Saturday 8 May 1943 against the now defunct Perry Engineering Works. The final score was a 9–0 win for Cumberland. Dunbar, for Cumberland, found the net six times, Ingham scored twice and Edwards once. The game was played as a home game for Cumberland at Hollywood Estate, a then adjacent suburb.

Since 1943 the club has won the championship twice and the Federation Cup once.

The Club established a more focused junior program in 1990 which has continued to grow since then, with 17 teams currently playing at Bailey Reserve. Many of the present senior players began their Club Football at Cumberland. This has been one of the key objectives of the program now coming to fruition.

== Current squad ==
Note: Flags indicate national team as defined under FIFA eligibility rules; some limited exceptions apply. Players may hold more than one non-FIFA nationality.

No.	Pos.	Nation	Player
1	GK	AUS	Luke Schoen
2	DF	AUS	Jack Schoen
11	FW	AUS	Harley Gepp

== Club honours ==
- State League Champions 2016
- State League Premiers 2016
- 1st Division Champions: 1978 & 1999
- 2nd Division Champions: 1984, 1986, 1997, 2003 & 2016
- Federation Cup Winners: 1978, 2009
- Premier League top 5 Champions: 2009
- State League Champions 2019
