= Gawler Eagles FC =

- Full name: Gawler Eagles FC
- Nickname: Eagles
- Founded: 1978; 48 years ago
- Ground: Karbeethan Reserve
- Capacity: 1,000
- Chairman: Joe Ridenti
- Manager: Terry Frangakis
- League: SA State League 2 North
- 2025: 4th of 8
- Website: https://www.gawlereagles.com.au/
Home colours	Away colours

Gawler Eagles Football Club is an amateur soccer club based in Evanston Gardens, an outer northern suburb of Adelaide in the Town of Gawler. The club was founded in 1978, playing in the South Australian Amateur Soccer League for most of its existence, they joined Football South Australia in 2006, and are currently playing in State League 2 South Australia.

== Past season results ==
Year	Played	Won	Drew	Lost	Points	Goals For	Goals Agst	Goal Diff.	Position on Table
2006	21	4	5	12	17	31	55	−24	4/5
2007	21	3	1	17	10	25	84	−59	5/6
2008	18	4	1	13	13	25	45	−20	7/10
2009	20	1	1	18	4	17	81	−64	11/11
2010	16	5	3	8	18	22	29	−7	6/9
2011	18	2	3	13	9	16	60	-44	9/10
2012	18	2	2	14	8	17	89	-72	9/10
2013	30	2	4	24	10	28	147	-119	15/16
2014	30	6	1	21	19	33	108	−75	14/15
2015	30	0	1	29	1	29	142	−113	16/16
2016	18	10	2	4	32	43	27	+16	2/9
2017	22	9	3	10	30	47	48	−1	8/12
2018	22	8	1	13	25	48	55	−7	9/12
2019	22	14	2	6	44	53	33	+20	2/12
2020	22	11	3	8	33	51	38	+13	6/12
2021	22	8	6	8	30	41	34	+7	8/12
2022	22	2	4	16	10	27	66	-39	12/12
2023	22	9	5	8	32	37	33	+4	6/12

Notes:

- State League divided into State League 1 and State League 2 in 2016
