= Modbury Jets SC =

Coordinates: 34°49′05″S 138°41′46″E

Modbury Jets
- Full name: Modbury Soccer Club Inc
- Nickname: The Jets
- Founded: 1965 as Modbury; 1993 as Modbury Jets
- Ground: Smith Partners Stadium (Jets Park)
- Capacity: 5,000
- Chairman: Jeff McCormack
- League: SA State League 1
- 2026: 2nd of 12
- Website: http://www.modburysc.org.au
Home colours	Away colours

Modbury SC, commonly known as Modbury Jets, is an Australian semi-professional soccer club based in Adelaide, South Australia. Its senior men's teams currently compete in the National Premier Leagues South Australia and senior women's team in the Women's State League. The club also fields junior teams for girls and boys. The seniors play their home matches at Smith Partners Stadium in Ridgehaven, north of Adelaide and the Juniors play at Burragah Reserve, Modbury North.

Modbury Soccer Club is a not-for-profit community football club based in Modbury, South Australia. Founded in 1964, the club has a long-standing history in local football.

It is affiliated with Football South Australia (FSA), the South Australian Amateur Soccer League (SAASL), and the national governing body, Football Australia (formerly Football Federation Australia). Through these affiliations, the club is indirectly connected to FIFA, the international governing body of association football.

Over the years, Modbury Soccer Club has grown from its original ‘working men’s’ foundation to a club that caters for all age groups and abilities. The club fields teams in Senior Men's and Senior Women's, Junior boys and girls, and MiniRoos competitions. It also fields teams in the SA Amateur Soccer Soccer League.

== History ==
The club was first founded in 1964, however they were forced to wait a year in order to play in the 1965 season. For reasons unknown, they played in the 3rd division reserve league while their reserve side played in the 4th division.

The club almost became the Modbury Prague Soccer Club in 1968 when members of the Czechoslovak Australian community in the area wanted to promote the game at Modbury. However the move was abandoned when club members vetoed the idea.

The club's facilities have been steadily improving over the years. Its ground was selected as one of the training venues for teams competing in the 2000 Olympic Games. Modbury is a popular community based club located in the Modbury/Tea Tree Gully area. The club fields both seniors and juniors teams.

In 2014, the Jets celebrated their fiftieth year as a club, and finished the season by clinching promotion through the play-off finals series.

== Current squad ==
As of 21 July 2022

Note: Flags indicate national team as defined under FIFA eligibility rules; some limited exceptions apply. Players may hold more than one non-FIFA nationality.

No.	Pos.	Nation	Player
1	GK	AUS	Alex Woodlands
2	DF	AUS	Paul Wilson
4	DF	AUS	Cameron O'Doherty
5	DF	AUS	Tim Henderson
6	MF	AUS	Patrick McGregor
7	DF	AUS	Liam McCabe
8	MF	AUS	Jordan O'Doherty
9	FW	AUS	Hamish McCabe
10	MF	AUS	Jesse Francesca (Captain)
11	FW	AUS	Francesco Schmizzi
12	MF	AUS	Zakaria Abdullahi

No.	Pos.	Nation	Player
13	DF	AUS	Daniel Ditroia
15	DF	AUS	Giuseppe Macheda
16	DF	AUS	Christian D'Argenio
17	MF	AUS	Lachlan Wilson
19	DF	AUS	Luca De Sciscio
20	GK	AUS	Thomas Hughes
22	MF	AUS	Matias Aloisi
24	DF	AUS	Fred Sunday
25	MF	AUS	Christian Tassotti
27	MF	SSD	Joke Wuol

== Honours ==
=== State ===
- South Australian First Division Championship

Runner-up (2): 2000, 2001

- South Australian First Division Premiership

Runner-up (1): 2001

- South Australian Second Division Championship

Winners (3): 1985, 1998, 2019
Runner-up (2): 1987, 2010

- South Australian Second Division Premiership

Winners (2): 2010, 2022

- South Australian Third Division Championship

Winners (1): 1973

- Federation Cup

Winners (1): 1989
Runner-up (2): 2004, 2022

- Night Series

Runner-up (1): 1992 September

== Football SA Player Awards ==
Roy Burdett, 2nd Division Player of the Year (1975)

Carl Whitehead, SASF Player of Year (1995)

Ross Fedele, State League Reserves Player of the Year (1998)

Mark Yates, SASF Player of Year (2000)

Mason Somerville, State League Player of the Year (2004)

David Crowl, State League Player of the Year (2010)

Brandon Pirone, State League U19s Player of the Year (2010)

Nathan Cheetham, State League U19s Player of the Year (2012)

Charlie Bowman, State League Golden Boot (2014)

James Levett, State League 1 U18s Player of the Year (2018)

Shaun McGreevy, State League 1 Golden Boot (2018)

Shaun McGreevy/Joshua Farrell, State League 1 Golden Boot (2019)

Kieran Griffiths, State League 1 Goalkeeper of the Year (2019)

Jokew Wuol, NPL U18s Player of the Year (2020)

Brayden, State League 1 U18s Player of the Year (2021)

== Football SA Coaching Awards ==
Earl Pudler, Premier League Coach of the Year (2010)

Jason Trimboli, State League 1 Coach of the Year (2019)

== Club Record Holders (1993–2022) ==
Senior Games Record Holder: Matt Kelly (252)

Senior Record Goal Scorer: Charlie Bowman (56)

== Players/Former Player Achievements ==
Jacob Melling – Under 17s Australian Representative at 2011 Mexico World Cup

Brandon Borrello – 1. FC Kaiserslautern and Australia U23s Representative

Bradden Inman – Current Rochdale A.F.C player

== Notable players ==
- (Australia) Aaron Westervelt
- (Australia) Louis Brain
- (Australia) Kristian Rees
- (Australia) Jacob Melling
- (Australia) Bradden Inman
- (Australia) Aaron Goulding
- (Australia) Harper Locke
