= Adelaide Hills Hawks SC =

Soccer club based in Woodside, South Australia

Adelaide Hills Hawks
- Full name: Adelaide Hills Hawks Soccer Club
- Founded: 1991; 35 years ago
- Ground: Hawks Nest
- League: SA State League 2 South
- 2026: 8th of 10
- Website: adelaidehillshawks.com.au

Adelaide Hills Hawks Soccer Club is a semi-professional soccer club based in Woodside, a town in the Adelaide Hills. The club was founded in 1991, and currently compete in State League 2 South Australia in the fourth tier of Australian soccer.

== History ==
The Adelaide Hills Soccer Club was founded in 1991 by the Adelaide Hills Junior Soccer Association. In its first year of operation, the club fielded a single team in the under-16 age group. By 1995, it had teams in the under-19 and under-23 age groups, and in 1998, it fielded a senior team in the SASF State League for the first time.

In 2004, the club moved to the Hawks Nest, their new permanent home ground in Woodside.

== Honours ==
- SASF State League / FFSA Premier League / SA State League 1 Champions
  - Winners (1): 2008
- FFSA State League / SA State League 2 Champions
  - Winners (1): 2019
  - Runners-up (1): 2012
- FFSA State League / SA State League 2 Premiers
  - Winners (1): 2019
  - Runners-up (1): 2018
