= Adelaide Atletico VSC =

Football club based in South Australia

- Full name: Adelaide Atletico Victory Soccer Club
- Founded: 2020
- Ground: Rushworth Reserve
- Manager: Nenad Tadic
- League: SA State League 1
- 2025: SA State League 2 North, 2nd of 8 (promoted)

Adelaide Atletico Victory Soccer Club, officially known as Adelaide Atletico VSC, or just Adelaide Atletico, are a semi-professional soccer club based in Blair Athol, South Australia. The club was founded in 2020 by Marcos Flores and merged with Adelaide Victory FC in 2024, taking their place in SA State League 1.

== Club history ==
From 2011, The Western Toros will introduce the FFA National Curriculum beginning at Junior level. The focus will be on developing football intelligence, technique and game awareness through modified small sided games in training.

In August, 2011 The Western Toros U15 team reached the club's first FFSA Cup Final. The game was held at Hindmarsh Stadium against Adelaide City. The Toros came from behind to win the game 4–3 with a late powerful header from Jordan Murphy following a corner.

In 2012 Western District Toros had their first ever championship win in the senior men's competition, coached by Lou Ricciuto and John Heenan.

In 2015 Western Toros changed their club name to Adelaide Victory FC to incorporate the greater Adelaide community, and moved their home ground to Rushworth Reserve, Blair Athol.

In 2018 Adelaide Victory were Champions of the FFSA State League 2 division, and were promoted to State League 1 for 2019.

In 2020 - the Adelaide Victory Senior Women's team commenced.

== Players ==
=== First team squad ===
As of 12 July 2024

Note: Flags indicate national team as defined under FIFA eligibility rules; some limited exceptions apply. Players may hold more than one non-FIFA nationality.

| No. | Pos. | Nation | Player |
|---|---|---|---|
| 2 | | AUS | Massimo Caiazza |
| 4 | | AUS | Lucas D'Argenio |
| 5 | | AUS | Christopher Annicchiarico |
| 6 | | AUS | Tyler Bailey |
| 8 | | AUS | Alessandro Mazzucotelli |
| 14 | | AUS | Adrian Totani |
| 16 | | AUS | Joseph De Rosa |
| 19 | | AUS | Dylan D'Agostino |
| 20 | GK | AUS | Konnor Pehlivanides |
| 21 | | AUS | Marco Cerracchio |

| No. | Pos. | Nation | Player |
|---|---|---|---|
| 23 | | AUS | Jack Grima |
| 24 | | AUS | Nathaniel Doyle |
| 35 | | AUS | Alexander Pontifex |
| 36 | | AUS | Aidan Schirripa |
| 37 | | AUS | Kalan James |
| 40 | | AUS | Nicholas Malatesta |
| 44 | | AUS | Liam Andijanto |
| 51 | | AUS | Joseph Garreffa |
| 55 | GK | AUS | Christian Luppino |
| 62 | | AUS | James Randell |
