= Western Strikers SC =

Soccer club in Adelaide, Australia

- Full name: Western Strikers Soccer Club
- Nickname: The Strikers
- Founded: 1980
- Ground: Carnegie Reserve, Royal Park, South Australia
- Chairman: Aggie Giannini
- Manager: Brenton Hiern
- League: South Australian State League 2
- Website: https://westernstrikers.com
Home colours

Western Strikers Soccer Club is a semi-professional soccer club based in Royal Park, South Australia, a suburb of Adelaide. The club currently competes in the South Australian State League 2, which is part of the Australian soccer league system.

== History ==
The club was founded in 1980 as VC Woodville City Junior Soccer Club, originally fielding three junior teams. Throughout the late 1980s and early 1990s, the club grew steadily and began entering senior competitions under the name Woodville City.

In 1998, the club was renamed Western Strikers Soccer Club and relocated to Grange Reserve. The first senior match under the new name was played against Modbury SC. In 2000, the club moved to its current home at Carnegie Reserve in Royal Park.

Western Strikers achieved promotion to the FFSA Super League (now known as the NPL SA) in 2006, marking a period of strong development. They remained competitive for several seasons before being relegated to State League 1 in 2014.

In 2022, the men's team reached the State League 2 Grand Final but lost to Vipers FC in extra time. They earned promotion in 2023 but were relegated again in 2024. The women's team was relaunched in 2022 and won the State League Division 2 title in 2023.

== Ground ==
The club's home ground is Carnegie Reserve in Royal Park, a community facility with fields, changerooms, and training infrastructure.

== Club Colours ==
Western Strikers traditionally wear a green and yellow home kit.

== Teams and Development ==
The club fields teams in:

- Men’s Senior, Reserves and U18s (State League 2)
- Women’s Senior Team (State League 1)
- Junior teams from U6 to U17, including MiniRoos and girls' teams

Western Strikers is known for its community focus and youth development programs.

== Honours ==
- Men’s Team
  - Promotion to FFSA Super League: 2008
  - State League 2 Grand Finalists: 2022
- Women’s Team
  - State League Division 2 Champions: 2023
- Junior Teams
  - U13 Girls Champions: 2023
