= Northern Demons SC =

Australian soccer club

- Full name: Northern Demons Soccer Club
- Founded: 1951; 75 years ago
- Ground: Byrne Park
- Capacity: 6,000
- Chairman: Steve Gadaleta
- Manager: Greg Joy John Mezzini
- League: SA State League 2 North
- 2026: 5th of 10
Home colours	Away colours

Northern Demons Soccer Club is a semi-professional soccer club based in Port Pirie, South Australia. The club was founded in 1951 as Virtus, and are currently playing in State League 2 South Australia, the fourth tier of Australian soccer.

== History ==
The Virtus Soccer Club was founded in 1951 by a group of predominantly Italian immigrants from the coastal city of Molfetta in southern Italy. In the aftermath of World War II, with Italy gripped by war and poverty, these men and women sought new lives and eventually came to settle in a handful of Australian cities including Port Pirie, South Australia. In the 1930s a fledgling soccer competition operated in the city but it wasn't until 1949 that the first recognised soccer club in Port Pirie, Savoy Soccer Club, was born. Savoy joined two other newly established teams, Central and Wanderers, to form the Port Pirie Soccer Association (PPSA) on 12 June 1949.

Whereas Central and Wanderers were composed mainly of English, Scottish and Australian locals, Savoy was the 'Italian' team and was the popular choice for the city's Italian immigrants looking for a game. Savoy's burgeoning popularity saw numbers swell to unmanageable numbers and many players frequently missed out as a result. Nepotism also played a part, with a select number of Italian families running the club and favouring their own relatives and friends. A group of fringe players would often meet at a club on Florence Street in the Port Pirie CBD after work and discuss soccer. One day the club owner suggested the players form their own team to compete against Savoy. The fringe players like the idea and between May and September 1950 held meetings to discuss forming the new team. A foundation committee was formed composed of Nicolo 'Nick' Gaudio (Committee Man), Nick Tattoli (President), Domenic Caputo (Treasurer), Carlo Rafanelli (Secretary), Morrie Pasculli and Joe Mezzini as chairman and vice-chairman respectively, and Dino Funda as selector/manager.

The new team committee eventually raised sufficient funds to lease a headquarters of sorts: a large garage situated behind Lord's Drycleaners on the corner of Main Rd and Parks St. Here fundraisers were held to help the club grow and afford basic team kits and equipment. Despite being quite unprepared, the club applied for admission to the PPSA on 15 November 1950. Their application for 1951 was denied but they were granted admission for the season after that (1952). They participated in friendly and trial matches for the duration of 1951. In or around October that year Domenico (Domenic) LoBasso arrived in Port Pirie from Egypt. Domenic was renowned for his soccer prowess and was signed by Savoy. He played one game for the green-and-whites before he was convinced by friends who played for the 'new' team to join them. He transferred and was installed as coach/captain.

Towards the end of 1951 and into early 1952 the new team settled on a name, 'Virtus', the name of LoBasso's team back in Egypt. The colours selected were red and white, the official colours of Molfetta. The club crest was modelled on that of English football club Manchester United and featured a shield with the 'VSC' insignia, a football and scroll. On Sunday 18 May 1952, Virtus played its first 'professional' match at Leonard Park against new rivals Savoy in Round 2 of the PPSA competition. The inaugural team consisted of: Felice (Phillip) Introna, Nick Capurso, Dino Funda, Maurie Pasculli, Don DeGiglio, Corrado (Dino/Roy) Turci, Giuseppe (Joe) Camporeale, Dominic Bovenga, Frank Binetti and Onofrio Farinola. Domenic Valenti, Domenic Pepe, Pasquale Rafanelli, Tony Annese, Joe Mezzini and Domenic Caputo were reserves and the young John Pasculli was team mascot. Virtus was defeated 2–4, Giuseppe Camporeale and Frank Binetti scored the team's goals. On Sunday 15 June, Virtus recorded its first win with a 2–1 victory over Rangers in Round 6.

In 1956 the Virtus committee leased a portion of land on Three Chain Rd to use as a home ground. It was named 'Backstrom's Reserve' after the lessor. Virtus won the PPSA Association Cup and despite finishing top of the table were declared 'joint champions' with Savoy by the PPSA following a dispute over a ruling on points. In 1957 Virtus joined the newly formed Northern Areas Soccer Association (NASA) and claimed its inaugural championship. Land on Magor Rd was purchased and developed into a new home venue. It was unofficially known as 'Virtus Park' until 1958 when it was renamed 'Byrne Park' in honour of Roger Byrne, captain of the ill-fated Manchester United team which perished in the Munich air disaster.

In 1960 two dilapidated properties situated at Numbers 9–11 Parks St, Port Pirie were purchased and demolished for establishment of clubrooms. The foundations were laid in September and the clubrooms were constructed over the next five years, officially opening on 26 June 1965. This was almost entirely the product of voluntary labor from club members, many of whom were tradesmen. Virtus won league championships in 1961, 1963, 1965 and 1966 and another three Association Cups in 1958, 1959 and 1966.

In 1976 the club undertook extensive renovations at its clubrooms. The club temporarily relocated to Globe Oval for the 1978/79 NASA seasons as renovation and landscaping took place at Byrne Park. In 1980 Virtus returned to Byrne Park and also secured its first ever major sponsorship deal with S D Caputo & Sons signing on as major sponsors.

Virtus experienced a renaissance in the 1980s and in 1985 secured the NASA league championship going undefeated under coach George Hadges. The feat was repeated in 1991. In 1996 Virtus obtained State and local Government funding for an extensive refurbishment project at Byrne Park, including the installation of a state-of-the-art lighting system for night fixtures. In 1999 the club made the historic move to the South Australian Soccer Federation (SASF), rebranding itself (in line with SASF requirements) as the 'Northern Demons'.

Whilst the Senior team has not yet enjoyed success at State level, the club's Under 19s have secured silverware on two separate occasions. In 2004 the Demons defeated Playford City Patriots 2–1 in the Grand Final held at Hindmarsh Stadium. Five years later, in 2009, the Under 19s once again won the league title with 4–2 penalty shootout win over Enfield City Falcons.

== Honours ==
- PPSA League Champions: 1956 (disputed)
- PPSA Association Cup: 1956
- MNSA League Champions: 1963, 1965, 1966
- NASA League Champions: 1957, 1961, 1985, 1988, 1991
- MNSA Association Cup: 1966, 1967
- NASA Association Cup: 1958, 1959, 1994, 1997
- MNSA League Cup: 1965
- Alitalia Cup: 1966
- Adelaide Inter-City Cup: 1992, 1993
- Angione-Saracino Charity Shield: 1990, 1991, 1992, 1993 (joint), 1994, 1995, 1996, 1997, 1998, 1999, 2000, 2001, 2002, 2003, 2004, 2005 (joint), 2006, 2007, 2008, 2009
