= Esposito =

Surname list

Esposito (Italian pronunciation: [eˈspɔːzito]) is an Italian surname. It ranks the fourth most common surname in Italy. It is especially common in Campania in general and in Naples in particular. The surname Esposito belongs to that group of Italian surnames that in the past were customarily given to foundlings, that is, children rejected by their natural parents and abandoned at birth or at an early age.

== Etymology and history ==
This surname is thought to derive from Latin expositus (Italian esposto, Old Italian or dialect esposito), the past participle of the Latin verb exponere 'to place outside, to expose', and so literally means 'placed outside, exposed'. In Italian, the stress is on the second syllable [eˈspɔːzito]; however, English speakers often wrongly pronounce it /ˌɛspəˈziːtoʊ/ ESP-ə-ZEE-toh, with the stress on the second.

Italian tradition claims that the surname was given to foundlings who were abandoned or placed for adoption and handed over to an orphanage (an Ospizio degli esposti lit. 'home or hospice of the exposed'). They were called espositi because they would be abandoned and "exposed" in a public place. Some orphanages maintained a ruota degli esposti 'wheel of the exposed' where abandoned children could be left. In the 19th century, laws were introduced forbidding the practice of giving surnames that reflected a child's origins.

A crude meaning is bastard or out-of-wedlock child.

As a surname, Esposito has produced, or is related to, several variants throughout modern Italy, such as D'Esposito, Degli Esposti, Esposti, Esposto, Sposito, etc. Other variants are also found in the Spanish-speaking world, for example Expósito.

== Notable people ==
- Alberto Mario Jorge Espósito (1950–2024), Argentine football manager
- Alfredo Espósito (1927–2010), Argentine bishop
- André Reinaldo de Souza Esposito (born 1982), better known simply as Andrezinho, Brazilian footballer
- Andrée Esposito (born 1934), French opera singer
- Angelo Esposito (born 1989), Canadian ice hockey player
- Antonio Esposito, multiple people
- Ben Esposito (born 1989), American video game designer
- Cameron Esposito (born 1981), American comedian
- Carlos Espósito (1941–2025), Argentine football referee
- Chloe Esposito, Australian pentathlete
- Christian Esposito (born 1990), Italian-Australian footballer
- Daniela Esposito, Italian ten-pin bowler
- Dennis Esposito (born 1988), Italian footballer
- Dino Esposito (born 1965), magazine columnist
- Elena Esposito (born 1960), Italian sociologist
- Ester Expósito (born 2000), Spanish actress and model
- Felissa Rose Esposito (born 1969), Italian-American actress
- Floriana Esposito (born 1947), Italian computer scientist
- Franck Esposito (born 1971), French swimmer
- Frank Esposito, multiple people
- Gaetano Esposito (1858–1911), Italian painter
- Giancarlo Esposito (born 1958), American actor
- Giani Esposito (1930–1974), French actor and singer-songwriter
- Gino Esposito, a fictional character on the Australian soap opera Neighbours
- Homero Expósito (1918–1987), Argentine poet and tango songwriter
- Iosu Expósito (1960–1992), Spanish musician
- Javier Esposito, a fictional character on the American comedy-drama television series Castle
- Jennifer Esposito (born 1973), American actress
- Joe Esposito, multiple people
- Joseph Esposito, multiple people
- John Esposito (born 1940), American professor
- Juan Esposito-Garcia (born 1974), Argentine priest
- Juan José Expósito Ruiz (born 1985), Spanish footballer
- Larry W. Esposito (born 1951), American planetary astronomer
- Manila Esposito (born 2006), Italian gymnast
- Mariana "Lali" Espósito (born 1991), Argentine actress and singer
- Mario Esposito (scholar) (1887–1975), scholar of Hiberno-Latin literature, son of Michele
- Mark Esposito, Swiss economist
- Mary Ann Esposito (born 1942), American cooking show host
- Mauro Esposito (born 1979), Italian footballer
- Max Esposito (born 1997), Australian modern pentathlete
- Meade Esposito (1907–1993), New York City politician
- Michele Esposito (1855–1929), Italian-born musical composer and pianist who lived most of his professional life in Dublin, Ireland
- Mike Esposito, multiple people
- Monica Esposito (1962–2011), Scholar of Chinese religion
- Pablo Despósito (born 1989), Argentine footballer
- Phil Esposito (born 1942), Canadian ice hockey player
- Phillip T. Esposito, US Army Captain, homicide victim
- Pio Esposito (born 2005), Italian footballer
- Raffaele Esposito, Italian tavern owner
- Raffaele Esposito (born 1996), know professionally as Lele, Italian singer-songwriter
- Ralph Esposito, Podiatric surgeon
- Roberto Esposito (born 1950), Italian philosopher
- Rosario Francesco Esposito (1921–2007), Italian Roman Catholic priest
- Salvatore Esposito, multiple people
- Sammy Esposito (1931–2018), American baseball player and coach
- Sebastiano Esposito (born 2002), Italian footballer
- Tony Esposito (1943–2021), Canadian ice hockey player, brother of Phil
- Tony Esposito (born 1950), musician, singer-songwriter and drummer from Italy
- Unai Expósito (born 1980), Spanish footballer
- Vincenzo Esposito (born 1969), Italian basketball coach
- Vincenzo Esposito (born 1963), Italian footballer and coach

== Fictional characters ==
- Hal Esposito, a character in the video game Bully
