= Fabian Barbiero =

Australian footballer (born 1984)

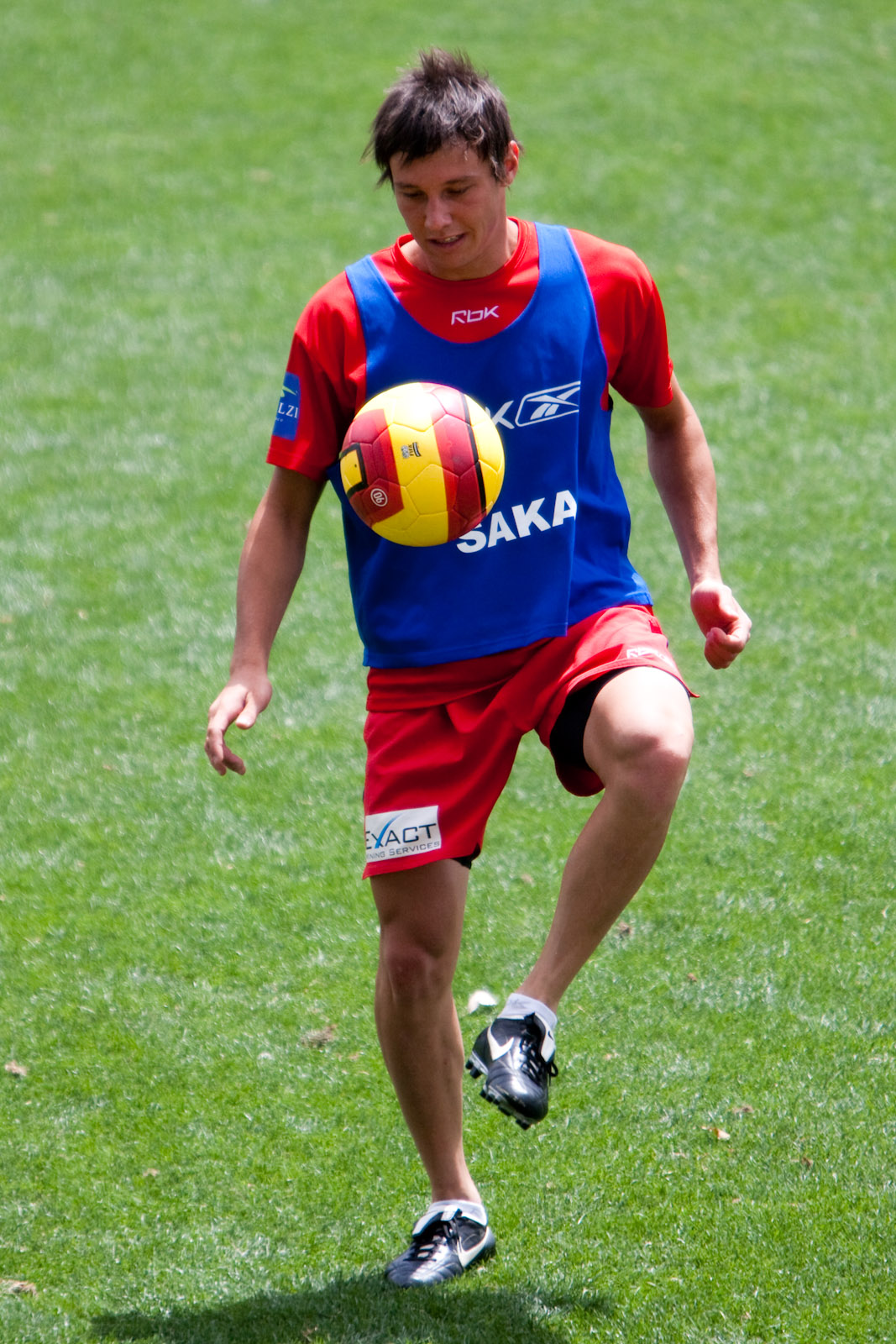
- Barbiero training with Adelaide United in 2010

Personal information
- Full name: Fabian Giuseppe Barbiero
- Date of birth: 2 May 1984 (age 42)
- Place of birth: Adelaide, Australia
- Height: 1.76 m (5 ft 9 in)
- Position: Central midfielder

Youth career
- South Adelaide

Senior career*
Years	Team	Apps	(Gls)
2002	South Adelaide	13	(0)
2003–2005	Adelaide Galaxy	31	(3)
2006–2007	MetroStars	32	(2)
2007–2013	Adelaide United	90	(8)
2013	Croydon Kings	8	(0)
2013–2025	MetroStars	225	(20)

International career^{‡}
2009	Australia	1	(0)
- * Club domestic league appearances and goals as of 24 November 2025 ‡ National team caps and goals as of 17:30, 29 October 2010 (UTC)

Fabian Giuseppe Barbiero (born 2 May 1984) is an Australian footballer who plays for MetroStars, as a central midfielder.

== Biography ==
=== Club career ===
Before joining Adelaide United Barbiero played for the North Eastern MetroStars. Barbiero signed for Adelaide in the 2007–08 season making his debut as a substitute against Perth Glory in a 1–1 draw at Hindmarsh Stadium; he went on to make 3 league appearances getting sent off on his full league debut.

With Jonas Salley being classified as a foreigner under new FIFA law Barbiero became a pivotal part in Adelaide's midfield in the AFC Champions League; this including the 3–0, semi-final, win over Bunyodkor where he not only was assigned to mark Rivaldo but also scored the second goal.

His good form did not go unnoticed by coach Aurelio Vidmar as he was handed his second league start in the 1–0 win over Queensland playing just over an hour before being replaced by Alemão.

Barbiero scored his first A-League goal against Newcastle Jets on 9 January 2009 converting from a tight angle to give Adelaide a 1–0 lead. Barbiero scored the Preliminary-Final goal against the Queensland Roar, that got Adelaide into the 2008–09 Grand Final against Melbourne Victory. On 14 April 2009 moved on trial to German Bundesliga club SpVgg Greuther Fürth.

=== International career ===
Barbiero made his first senior international debut for the Australian national team on 4 March 2009 in an AFC Cup qualifying match versus Kuwait.

== Career statistics ==
Appearances and goals by club, season and competition
Club	Season	League			National Cup		League Cup		Continental		Other		Total	
Club	Season	Division	Apps	Goals	Apps	Goals	Apps	Goals	Apps	Goals	Apps	Goals	Apps	Goals
South Adelaide	2002	SASF State League	13	0	0	0	0	0	0	0	1 (Note: Appearance(s) in Football SA Federation Cup)	0	14	0
Adelaide Galaxy	2003	SASF Premier League	1	0	0	0	0	0	0	0	1	0	2	0
Adelaide Galaxy	2004	SASF Premier League	14	0	0	0	0	0	0	0	4	1	18	1
Adelaide Galaxy	2005	SASF Premier League	16	3	0	0	0	0	0	0	0	0	16	3
Adelaide Galaxy	Total		31	3	0	0	0	0	0	0	5	1	20	1
MetroStars	2006	FFSA Super League	16	0	0	0	0	0	0	0	3	0	19	1
MetroStars	2007	FFSA Super League	16	2	0	0	0	0	0	0	4	1	20	3
MetroStars	Total		32	2	0	0	0	0	0	0	7	1	39	3
Adelaide United	2007–08	A-League	3	0	0	0	0	0	3 (Note: Appearances in 2008 AFC Champions League group stage)	0	0	0	6	0
Adelaide United	2008–09	A-League	19	2	0	0	3 (Note: Appearances in 2008 A-League Pre-Season Challenge Cup)	0	3 (Note: Appearances in 2008 AFC Champions League knockout stage)	1	2 (Note: Appearances in 2008 FIFA Club World Cup)	0	27	3
Adelaide United	2009–10	A-League	18	3	0	0	0	0	5 (Note: Appearances in 2009 AFC Champions League)	0	0	0	23	3
Adelaide United	2010–11	A-League	16	1	0	0	0	0	0	0	0	0	16	1
Adelaide United	2011–12	A-League	18	2	0	0	0	0	10 (Note: Appearances in 2012 AFC Champions League)	0	0	0	28	2
Adelaide United	2012–13	A-League	16	0	0	0	0	0	0	0	0	0	16	0
Adelaide United	Total		90	8	0	0	3	0	18	1	2	0	113	9
Croydon Kings	2013	NPL SA	8	0	0	0	0	0	0	0	1	0	9	0
MetroStars	2014	NPL SA	20	3	3	1	0	0	0	0	0	0	23	4
MetroStars	2015	NPL SA	20	1	2	0	0	0	0	0	2	1	24	2
MetroStars	2016	NPL SA	19	3	1	0	0	0	0	0	4	0	24	3
MetroStars	2017	NPL SA	22	1	1	0	0	0	0	0	4	0	27	1
MetroStars	2018	NPL SA	6	0	0	0	0	0	0	0	0	0	6	0
MetroStars	2019	NPL SA	18	1	0	0	0	0	0	0	3	0	21	1
MetroStars	2020	NPL SA	22	1	0	0	0	0	0	0	0	0	22	1
MetroStars	2021	NPL SA	22	1	0	0	0	0	0	0	4	0	26	1
MetroStars	Total		139	11	7	1	0	0	0	0	17	1	163	13
Career total			313	24	7	1	3	0	18	1	31	3	372	29
