= Robert Cornthwaite (soccer) =

Australian former soccer player

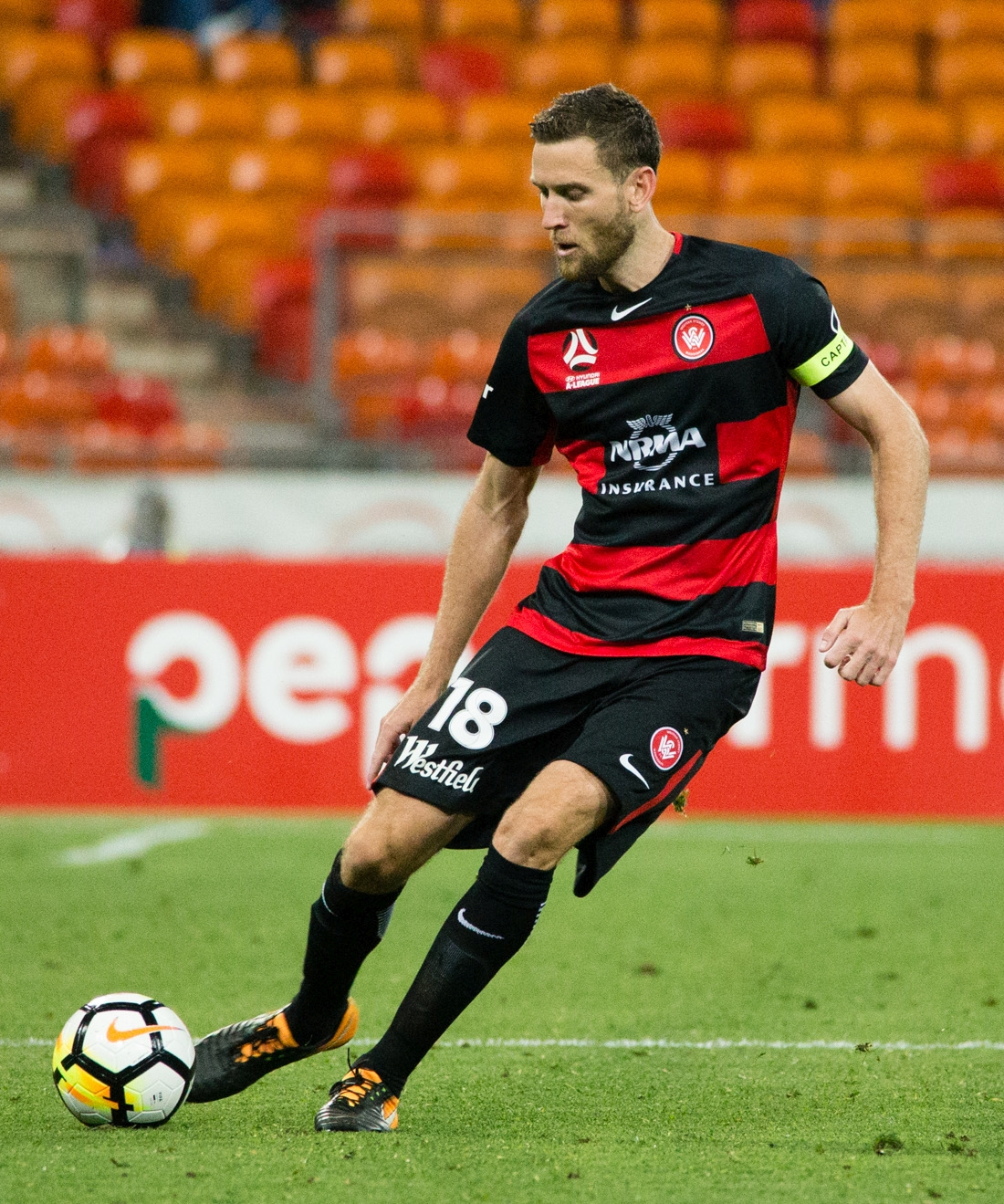
- Cornthwaite playing for Western Sydney Wanderers in 2017

Personal information
- Full name: Robert Richard Cornthwaite
- Date of birth: 24 October 1985 (age 41)
- Place of birth: Blackburn, England
- Height: 1.95 m (6 ft 5 in)
- Position: Centre back

Youth career
- 2003: Adelaide City
- 2004: Enfield City
- 2005: White City

Senior career*
Years	Team	Apps	(Gls)
2003	Adelaide City	21	(0)
2004	Enfield City	19	(1)
2005	White City	3	(2)
2005–2011	Adelaide United	103	(4)
2006	→ Adelaide Olympic (loan)	8	(0)
2011–2014	Jeonnam Dragons	90	(7)
2015–2016	Selangor	23	(4)
2016–2018	Western Sydney Wanderers	30	(2)
2018	Perak	11	(1)
Total		308	(21)

International career^{‡}
2007	Australia U-23	6	(1)
2009–2013	Australia	7	(3)
- * Club domestic league appearances and goals as of 24 February 2018 ‡ National team caps and goals as of 22 May 2016

Robert Richard Cornthwaite (born 24 October 1985), nicknamed "Cornflakes", is an Australian former soccer player. Alongside Eli Babalj and Sasa Ognenovski, Cornthwaite, at 1.95 m is the joint fourth tallest player to have represented the Australia national association football team, behind Zeljko Kalac (2.02 m), Harry Souttar (1.98 m) and Tete Yengi (1.97 m).

== Club career ==
=== Adelaide United ===
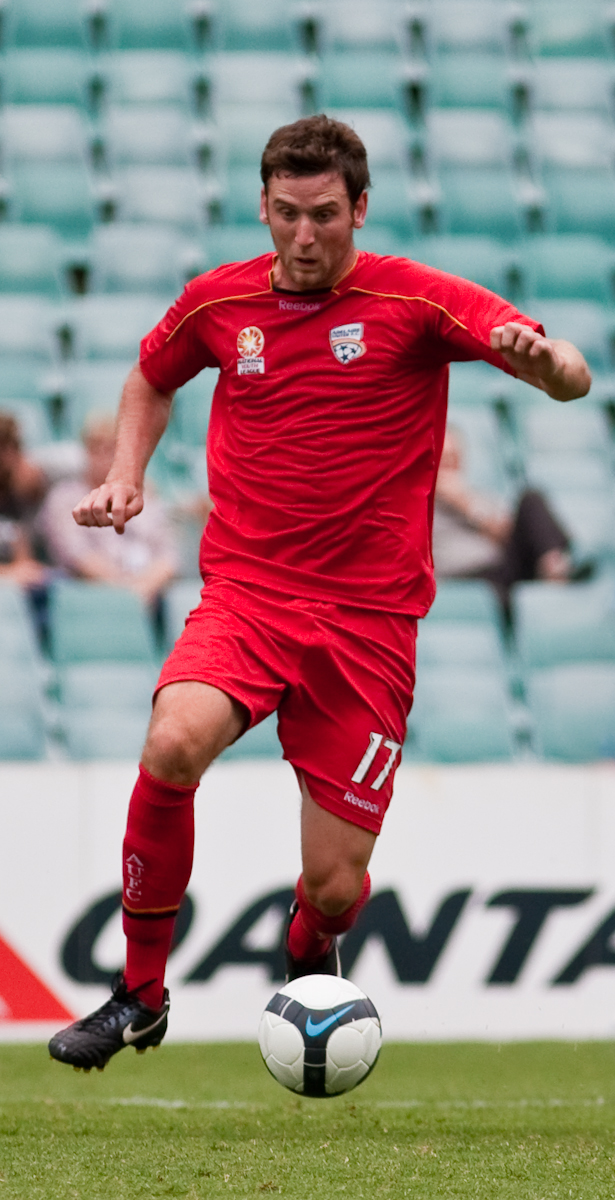
Cornthwaite with Adelaide United in 2009

Cornthwaite signed for United for the inaugural A-League season and spent the majority of his first two seasons starting on the bench. In the 2007–08 he started all of his 19 league appearances; he scored the opening goal in just the third minute against Pohang Steelers in Adelaide United's opening game of the 2008 Asian Champion League.

As of half time of Adelaide United's away game against J League 5-time champions Kashima Antlers in the quarter finals of the 2008 AFC Champions League, Robert scored an accidental own goal to put Kashima level with Adelaide 1–1 after a spectacular goal from Adelaide captain Travis Dodd which came after a cross from vice-captain Lucas Pantelis in the 38th minute. The match being the first leg of the 2 teams Quarter finals match dated on Wednesday 17 September in Japan. He redeemed himself though in the second leg where he scored the winner in the 73rd minute with the game locked at 0–0. Adelaide went on to win 2–1 on aggregate and advance to the semi-finals.

Robert Cornthwaite made his 50th A-League appearance in the 1–0 win over Perth Glory on 27 December 2008. Cornthwaite signed a new three-year contract with Adelaide United in October 2009.

=== Jeonnam Dragons ===
On 8 March 2011, Cornthwaite announced that he had signed for Jeonnam Dragons in the Korean K-League on a 2-year contract.

=== Selangor ===
Robert joined the Malaysian Super League outfit Selangor in early 2015 and scored a few goals for the club. He was selected to play for Malaysian XI in a friendly match against Tottenham Hotspur in July 2015.

In January 2016 his contract with Selangor was continued after Selangor fans forced the Football Association of Selangor to continue his contract by using the social media.

On 9 July 2016, Cornthwaite was released by Selangor.

=== Western Sydney Wanderers ===
On 14 July 2016, Cornthwaite joined Western Sydney Wanderers on a two-year deal.

=== Perak ===
On 16 January 2018, Cornthwaite signed a contract with Malaysia Super League club Perak on a one plus one-year deal.

Cornthwaite announced his immediate retirement from football on 4 June 2018, halfway through his Perak contract.

== International career ==
Cornthwaite made his first senior international debut for the Socceroos on 4 March 2009 in an AFC Asian Cup qualifying match versus Kuwait. He scored his first international goal in against South Korea in a 2012 friendly.

== Post-football ==
Still based in Adelaide, Cornthwaite is currently Head of Sport for Seven Network (7News Adelaide).

== Career statistics ==
=== Club ===
As of match played 8 October 2017

Club	Season	League^{1}		Cup		International^{2}		Total	
Club	Season	Apps	Goals	Apps	Goals	Apps	Goals	Apps	Goals
Adelaide City	2003	21	0	0	0	0	0	21	0
Total		21	0	0	0	0	0	21	0
Enfield City	2004	19	1	0	0	0	0	19	1
Total		19	1	0	0	0	0	19	1
White City	2005	3	2	0	0	0	0	3	2
Total		3	2	0	0	0	0	3	2
Adelaide United	2005–06	12	–	–	–	–	–	12	–
Adelaide United	2006–07	8	1	6	–	–	–	14	1
Adelaide United	2007–08	19	–	5	–	1	–	25	–
Adelaide United	2008–09	20	2	3	–	13	2	36	4
Adelaide United	2009–10	19	–	–	–	–	–	19	–
Adelaide United	2010–11	25	1	–	–	6	2	31	3
Total		103	4	14	0	20	4	137	8
Jeonnam Dragons	2011	17	1	4	2	0	0	21	3
Jeonnam Dragons	2012	31	3	1	0	0	0	32	3
Jeonnam Dragons	2013	22	1	1	0	0	0	23	1
Jeonnam Dragons	2014	20	2	0	0	0	0	20	2
Total		90	7	6	2	0	0	96	9
Selangor	2015	15	4	2	0	0	0	17	4
Selangor	2016	8	0	0	0	3	0	11	0
Total		23	4	2	0	3	0	28	4
Western Sydney Wanderers	2016–17	19	2	0	0	2	0	21	2
Western Sydney Wanderers	2017–18	11	0	3	1	0	0	14	1
Total		30	2	3	1	2	0	35	3
Total career		289	20	25	3	25	0	339	23

^{1} – includes A-League final series statistics
^{2} – includes FIFA Club World Cup statistics; AFC Champions League statistics are included in season commencing after group stages (i.e. 2008 ACL in 2008–09 A-League season etc.)

=== International ===
As of 15 November 2017

Australia national team
Year	Apps	Goals
2009	1	0
2012	4	2
2013	2	1
Total	7	3

==== International goals ====
#	Date	Venue	Opponent	Score	Result	Competition
1.	14 November 2012	Hwaseong Stadium, Hwaseong, South Korea	South Korea	1–2	1–2	International Friendly
2.	9 December 2012	Hong Kong Stadium, Hong Kong, Hong Kong	Chinese Taipei	2–0	8–0	2013 EAFF East Asian Cup
3.	6 February 2013	Estadio Municipal de Marbella, Marbella, Spain	Romania	2–1	2–3	Friendly

== Honours ==
=== Club ===
Adelaide United

- A-League Premiership: 2005–06

Selangor

- Malaysia Cup: 2015

== Personal life ==
Cornthwaite was born in Blackburn, England and was brought up in Adelaide, South Australia.
