= Sposito =

Sposito is an Italian surname. Notable people with the surname include:

- Carlo Sposito (1924–1984), Italian actor
- Raffaele Sposito (1922–1981), Italian playwright better known as Faele
- Rafael Spósito Balzarini (1952–2009), Uruguayan anarchist
- Santino Sposito (born 2002), Argentine beach handball player

== See also ==
- Esposito
- Sposato
