= Antonio Esposito =

Antonio Esposito may refer to:

- Antonio Esposito (footballer, born 1972), Swiss-Italian former midfielder
- Antonio Esposito (footballer, born 1983), Italian midfielder
- Antonio Esposito (footballer, born 1990), Italian midfielder
- Antonio Esposito (footballer, born 2000), Italian fullback
- Antonio Esposito (judoka) (born 1994), Italian judoka
- Tony Esposito (musician) (born 1950), Italian singer and songwriter
