= 2014 National Premier Leagues =

National Premier Leagues
- Season: 2014
- Champions: North Eastern MetroStars (1st Title)
- Finalists: Bayswater City; Bonnyrigg White Eagles; Cooma; North Eastern MetroStars; Palm Beach; South Hobart; South Melbourne; Weston Workers

The 2014 National Premier Leagues was the second season of the Australian National Premier Leagues soccer competition.

This season was notable for the fact that it expanded the league to include three new divisions: Northern NSW, Victoria and Western Australia. These new divisions, combined with the divisions of prior years (being ACT, NSW, Queensland, South Australia and Tasmania), totalled to eight divisional leagues that Australian players then competed in. The winners of each divisional league went on to compete in a finals playoff tournament at the end of the season. This culminated in a grand final in which North Eastern MetroStars were crowned as National Premier Leagues Champions, and were thus qualified for the 2015 FFA Cup Round of 32.

== League tables ==
=== ACT ===
| Pos | Team | Pld | W | D | L | GF | GA | GD | Pts | Qualification or relegation |
|---|---|---|---|---|---|---|---|---|---|---|
| 1 | Cooma | 16 | 13 | 1 | 2 | 54 | 17 | +37 | 40 | 2014 National Premier Leagues Finals |
| 2 | Belconnen United (C) | 16 | 11 | 2 | 3 | 53 | 24 | +29 | 35 | 2014 ACT Finals |
| 3 | Canberra Olympic | 16 | 8 | 3 | 5 | 41 | 28 | +13 | 27 | 2014 ACT Finals |
| 4 | Canberra | 16 | 8 | 1 | 7 | 51 | 28 | +23 | 25 | 2014 ACT Finals |
| 5 | FFA Centre of Excellence | 16 | 7 | 1 | 8 | 35 | 39 | −4 | 22 | |
| 6 | Tuggeranong United | 16 | 6 | 0 | 10 | 26 | 45 | −19 | 18 | |
| 7 | Woden Valley | 16 | 5 | 2 | 9 | 20 | 32 | −12 | 17 | |
| 8 | Monaro Panthers | 16 | 4 | 2 | 10 | 26 | 59 | −33 | 14 | |
| 9 | Canberra City (R) | 16 | 3 | 2 | 11 | 16 | 50 | −34 | 11 | Relegated to the 2015 ACT Division 1 |

Updated to match(es) played on 24 August 2014. Source: foxsportspulse.com
Rules for classification: 1) points; 2) goal difference; 3) number of goals scored.
(C) Champions; (R) Relegated

==== Finals ====
Semi-finals
1 | Cooma | 0
2 | Belconnen United | 6
3 | Canberra Olympic | 2
4 | Canberra FC | 3

Preliminary final
1 | Cooma | 0
4 | Canberra FC | 3

Grand final
2 | Belconnen United | 3 (3)
4 | Canberra FC | 3 (2)

=== NSW ===
| Pos | Team | Pld | W | D | L | GF | GA | GD | Pts | Qualification or relegation |
|---|---|---|---|---|---|---|---|---|---|---|
| 1 | Bonnyrigg White Eagles | 22 | 15 | 2 | 5 | 41 | 21 | +20 | 47 | 2014 National Premier Leagues Finals |
| 2 | Blacktown Spartans | 22 | 15 | 1 | 6 | 55 | 34 | +21 | 46 | 2014 NSW Finals |
| 3 | Blacktown City (C) | 22 | 14 | 2 | 6 | 51 | 22 | +29 | 44 | 2014 NSW Finals |
| 4 | Sydney Olympic | 22 | 10 | 5 | 7 | 35 | 27 | +8 | 35 | 2014 NSW Finals |
| 5 | Rockdale City Suns | 22 | 10 | 4 | 8 | 26 | 24 | +2 | 34 | 2014 NSW Finals |
| 6 | Sutherland Sharks | 22 | 9 | 3 | 10 | 43 | 42 | +1 | 30 | |
| 7 | South Coast Wolves | 22 | 7 | 6 | 9 | 32 | 35 | −3 | 27 | |
| 8 | Marconi Stallions | 22 | 7 | 4 | 11 | 28 | 36 | −8 | 25 | |
| 9 | Sydney United 58 | 22 | 6 | 6 | 10 | 25 | 29 | −4 | 24 | |
| 10 | Manly United | 22 | 7 | 3 | 12 | 31 | 46 | −15 | 24 | |
| 11 | APIA Leichhardt Tigers | 22 | 4 | 8 | 10 | 31 | 51 | −20 | 20 | |
| 12 | St George (R) | 22 | 4 | 4 | 14 | 18 | 49 | −31 | 16 | Relegated to the 2015 NPL NSW 2 |

Updated to match(es) played on 17 August 2014. Source: foxsportspulse.com
Rules for classification: 1) points; 2) goal difference; 3) number of goals scored.
(C) Champions; (R) Relegated

==== Finals ====
Qualifying final
2 | Blacktown Spartans | 0
3 | Blacktown City | 3
4 | Sydney Olympic | 2
5 | Rockdale City Suns | 1

Major semi-final
1 | Bonnyrigg White Eagles | 0
3 | Blacktown City | 1
Minor semi-final
2 | Blacktown Spartans | 0
4 | Sydney Olympic | 3

Preliminary final
1 | Bonnyrigg White Eagles | 1 (5)
4 | Sydney Olympic | 1 (6)

Grand final
3 | Blacktown City | 2
4 | Sydney Olympic | 1

=== Northern NSW ===
| Pos | Team | Pld | W | D | L | GF | GA | GD | Pts | Qualification or relegation |
|---|---|---|---|---|---|---|---|---|---|---|
| 1 | Newcastle Jets Youth | 18 | 10 | 4 | 4 | 41 | 24 | +17 | 34 | 2014 Northern NSW Finals |
| 2 | Weston Workers | 18 | 9 | 5 | 4 | 34 | 29 | +5 | 32 | 2014 National Premier Leagues Finals (Note: As an A-League Youth team, Newcastle Jets Youth were unable to claim Northern NSW's National Premier Leagues Finals spot, which was given to the runners up.) |
| 3 | Lambton Jaffas (C) | 18 | 9 | 3 | 6 | 37 | 22 | +15 | 30 | 2014 Northern NSW Finals |
| 4 | Charlestown City Blues | 18 | 8 | 4 | 6 | 31 | 30 | +1 | 28 | 2014 Northern NSW Finals |
| 5 | Edgeworth Eagles | 18 | 7 | 6 | 5 | 28 | 19 | +9 | 27 | 2014 Northern NSW Finals |
| 6 | Hamilton Olympic | 18 | 7 | 5 | 6 | 30 | 28 | +2 | 26 | |
| 7 | South Cardiff | 18 | 6 | 3 | 9 | 24 | 34 | −10 | 21 | |
| 8 | Adamstown Rosebud | 18 | 6 | 3 | 9 | 24 | 41 | −17 | 21 | |
| 9 | Broadmeadow Magic | 18 | 6 | 2 | 10 | 24 | 27 | −3 | 20 | |
| 10 | Lake Macquarie City (R) | 18 | 3 | 3 | 12 | 25 | 44 | −19 | 12 | Relegated to the 2015 Northern NSW State League |

Updated to match(es) played on 10 August 2014. Source: foxsportspulse.com
Rules for classification: 1) points; 2) goal difference; 3) number of goals scored.
(C) Champions; (R) Relegated

==== Finals ====
Qualifying final
2 | Weston Workers | 3
3 | Lambton Jaffas | 2
4 | Charlestown City Blues | 2
5 | Edgeworth Eagles | 1

Major semi-final
1 | Newcastle Jets Youth | 2
2 | Weston Workers | 3
Minor semi-final
3 | Lambton Jaffas | 3
4 | Charlestown City Blues | 1

Preliminary final
1 | Newcastle Jets Youth | 3
3 | Lambton Jaffas | 4

Grand final
2 | Weston Workers | 0
3 | Lambton Jaffas | 2

=== Queensland ===
| Pos | Team | Pld | W | D | L | GF | GA | GD | Pts | Qualification or relegation |
|---|---|---|---|---|---|---|---|---|---|---|
| 1 | Palm Beach (C) | 24 | 17 | 4 | 3 | 73 | 29 | +44 | 55 | 2014 National Premier Leagues Finals |
| 2 | Far North Queensland | 24 | 15 | 3 | 6 | 64 | 48 | +16 | 48 | 2014 Queensland Finals |
| 3 | Olympic FC | 24 | 14 | 5 | 5 | 72 | 37 | +35 | 47 | 2014 Queensland Finals |
| 4 | Brisbane Strikers | 24 | 14 | 3 | 7 | 53 | 38 | +15 | 45 | 2014 Queensland Finals |
| 5 | Moreton Bay United | 24 | 12 | 4 | 8 | 78 | 53 | +25 | 40 | |
| 6 | Redlands United | 24 | 11 | 5 | 8 | 54 | 48 | +6 | 38 (Note: The Round 25 fixture between South West Thunder and Redlands United was cancelled and declared a 0–0 draw.) | |
| 7 | Brisbane City | 24 | 11 | 4 | 9 | 42 | 37 | +5 | 37 | |
| 8 | Sunshine Coast | 24 | 11 | 1 | 12 | 39 | 39 | 0 | 34 | |
| 9 | Harimau Muda (Note: Harimau Muda are not eligible for the NPL Finals.) (R) | 24 | 9 | 6 | 9 | 51 | 45 | +6 | 33 | Team withdrew at end of season |
| 10 | Brisbane Roar Youth | 24 | 9 | 4 | 11 | 45 | 51 | −6 | 31 | |
| 11 | Northern Fury | 24 | 6 | 4 | 14 | 38 | 50 | −12 | 22 | |
| 12 | Western Pride | 24 | 5 | 0 | 19 | 39 | 73 | −34 | 15 | |
| 13 | South West Queensland Thunder | 24 | 0 | 1 | 23 | 12 | 112 | −100 | 1 | |

Updated to match(es) played on 4 September 2014. Source: foxsportspulse.com
Rules for classification: 1) points; 2) goal difference; 3) number of goals scored.
Central Queensland Energy were removed from the NPL in March 2014 after failing to meet licensing conditions.
(C) Champions; (R) Relegated

==== Finals ====
Semi-finals
1 | Palm Beach | 2
4 | Brisbane Strikers | 1
2 | FNQ FC Heat | 4
3 | Olympic | 5

Grand final
1 | Palm Beach | 3
3 | Olympic | 2

=== South Australia ===
| Pos | Team | Pld | W | D | L | GF | GA | GD | Pts | Qualification or relegation |
|---|---|---|---|---|---|---|---|---|---|---|
| 1 | North Eastern MetroStars | 26 | 19 | 4 | 3 | 63 | 19 | +44 | 61 | 2014 National Premier Leagues Finals |
| 2 | West Adelaide | 26 | 16 | 5 | 5 | 56 | 34 | +22 | 53 | 2014 South Australia Finals |
| 3 | Croydon Kings (C) | 26 | 16 | 4 | 6 | 61 | 40 | +21 | 52 | 2014 South Australia Finals |
| 4 | Adelaide Blue Eagles | 26 | 15 | 3 | 8 | 50 | 34 | +16 | 48 | 2014 South Australia Finals |
| 5 | Adelaide Comets | 26 | 14 | 2 | 10 | 53 | 48 | +5 | 44 | 2014 South Australia Finals |
| 6 | Adelaide City | 26 | 13 | 3 | 10 | 47 | 33 | +14 | 42 | 2014 South Australia Finals |
| 7 | Campbelltown City | 26 | 12 | 3 | 11 | 39 | 43 | −4 | 39 | |
| 8 | White City | 26 | 9 | 5 | 12 | 47 | 50 | −3 | 32 | |
| 9 | Para Hills Knights | 26 | 9 | 2 | 15 | 34 | 55 | −21 | 29 | |
| 10 | Adelaide Raiders | 26 | 8 | 4 | 14 | 28 | 43 | −15 | 28 | |
| 11 | West Torrens Birkalla | 26 | 7 | 5 | 14 | 36 | 52 | −16 | 26 | |
| 12 | South Adelaide | 26 | 5 | 10 | 11 | 29 | 40 | −11 | 25 | |
| 13 | Cumberland United (R) | 26 | 5 | 6 | 15 | 32 | 53 | −21 | 21 | Relegated to the 2015 SA State League |
| 14 | Western Strikers (R) | 26 | 4 | 4 | 18 | 20 | 51 | −31 | 16 | Relegated to the 2015 SA State League |

Updated to match(es) played on 16 August 2014. Source: foxsportspulse.com
Rules for classification: 1) points; 2) goal difference; 3) number of goals scored.
(C) Champions; (R) Relegated

==== Finals ====
Elimination finals
3 | Croydon Kings | 4
6 | Adelaide City | 0
4 | Adelaide Blue Eagles | 3
5 | Adelaide Comets | 0

Semifinals
1 | West Adelaide | 0
2 | North Eastern MetroStars | 2
Croydon Kings | 4
Adelaide Blue Eagles | 1

Preliminary final
West Adelaide | 1 (4)
Croydon Kings | 1 (5)

Grand final
North Eastern MetroStars | 1
Croydon Kings | 2

=== Tasmania ===
| Pos | Team | Pld | W | D | L | GF | GA | GD | Pts | Qualification or relegation |
|---|---|---|---|---|---|---|---|---|---|---|
| 1 | South Hobart (C) | 21 | 18 | 1 | 2 | 89 | 18 | +71 | 55 | 2014 National Premier Leagues Finals |
| 2 | Hobart Zebras | 21 | 15 | 2 | 4 | 63 | 20 | +43 | 47 | 2014 Tasmania Finals |
| 3 | Olympia | 21 | 13 | 2 | 6 | 51 | 34 | +17 | 41 | 2014 Tasmania Finals |
| 4 | Northern Rangers | 21 | 11 | 3 | 7 | 51 | 38 | +13 | 36 | 2014 Tasmania Finals |
| 5 | Devonport City | 21 | 9 | 2 | 10 | 49 | 49 | 0 | 29 | |
| 6 | Kingborough Lions United | 21 | 5 | 1 | 15 | 35 | 84 | −49 | 16 | |
| 7 | Glenorchy Knights | 21 | 3 | 2 | 16 | 28 | 66 | −38 | 11 | |
| 8 | Launceston City | 21 | 3 | 1 | 17 | 29 | 86 | −57 | 10 | |

Updated to match(es) played on 30 August 2014. Source: foxsportspulse.com
Rules for classification: 1) points; 2) goal difference; 3) number of goals scored.
(C) Champions

==== Finals ====
The top 4 teams play a knock-out finals series called the Victory Cup, where the semi-final match-ups were randomly drawn.

Semi-finals
1 | South Hobart | 3
2 | Hobart Zebras | 1
3 | Olympia | 1
4 | Northern Rangers | 3

Grand final
1 | South Hobart | 3
4 | Northern Rangers | 1

=== Victoria ===
| Pos | Team | Pld | W | D | L | GF | GA | GD | Pts | Qualification or relegation |
|---|---|---|---|---|---|---|---|---|---|---|
| 1 | South Melbourne (C) | 26 | 21 | 3 | 2 | 59 | 22 | +37 | 66 | 2014 National Premier Leagues Finals |
| 2 | Oakleigh Cannons | 26 | 18 | 5 | 3 | 61 | 19 | +42 | 59 | |
| 3 | Heidelberg United | 26 | 12 | 9 | 5 | 55 | 32 | +23 | 45 | |
| 4 | Bentleigh Greens | 26 | 12 | 7 | 7 | 48 | 35 | +13 | 43 | |
| 5 | Melbourne Knights | 26 | 12 | 2 | 12 | 41 | 36 | +5 | 38 | |
| 6 | Hume City | 26 | 12 | 2 | 12 | 33 | 33 | 0 | 38 | |
| 7 | Northcote City | 26 | 10 | 6 | 10 | 38 | 39 | −1 | 36 | |
| 8 | Pascoe Vale | 26 | 9 | 7 | 10 | 30 | 34 | −4 | 34 | |
| 9 | Green Gully | 26 | 9 | 3 | 14 | 45 | 52 | −7 | 30 | |
| 10 | Dandenong Thunder | 26 | 8 | 6 | 12 | 33 | 47 | −14 | 30 | |
| 11 | Port Melbourne | 26 | 7 | 7 | 12 | 33 | 47 | −14 | 28 | |
| 12 | Werribee City | 26 | 8 | 4 | 14 | 29 | 50 | −21 | 28 | |
| 13 | Ballarat Red Devils (R) | 26 | 8 | 3 | 15 | 40 | 51 | −11 | 27 | Relegated to the 2015 NPL Victoria 2 |
| 14 | Goulburn Valley Suns (R) | 26 | 2 | 4 | 20 | 27 | 75 | −48 | 10 | Relegated to the 2015 NPL Victoria 2 |

Updated to match(es) played on 14 September 2014. Source: foxsportspulse.com
Rules for classification: 1) points; 2) goal difference; 3) number of goals scored.
(C) Champions; (R) Relegated

=== Western Australia ===
| Pos | Team | Pld | W | D | L | GF | GA | GD | Pts | Qualification or relegation |
|---|---|---|---|---|---|---|---|---|---|---|
| 1 | Bayswater City (C) | 22 | 16 | 3 | 3 | 53 | 20 | +33 | 51 | 2014 National Premier Leagues Finals |
| 2 | Perth SC | 22 | 15 | 4 | 3 | 51 | 22 | +29 | 49 | 2014 Western Australia Finals |
| 3 | Balcatta | 22 | 14 | 1 | 7 | 47 | 25 | +22 | 43 | 2014 Western Australia Finals |
| 4 | Sorrento | 22 | 12 | 5 | 5 | 48 | 39 | +9 | 41 | 2014 Western Australia Finals |
| 5 | Stirling Lions | 22 | 11 | 5 | 6 | 41 | 28 | +13 | 38 | |
| 6 | Cockburn City | 22 | 10 | 5 | 7 | 49 | 41 | +8 | 35 | |
| 7 | Floreat Athena | 22 | 10 | 1 | 11 | 47 | 46 | +1 | 31 | |
| 8 | ECU Joondalup | 22 | 9 | 3 | 10 | 39 | 37 | +2 | 30 | |
| 9 | Inglewood United | 22 | 6 | 4 | 12 | 41 | 43 | −2 | 22 | |
| 10 | Perth Glory Youth | 22 | 4 | 3 | 15 | 36 | 64 | −28 | 15 | |
| 11 | Subiaco AFC | 22 | 4 | 2 | 16 | 26 | 55 | −29 | 14 | |
| 12 | Armadale | 22 | 1 | 4 | 17 | 16 | 64 | −48 | 7 | |

Updated to match(es) played on 23 August 2014. Source: foxsportspulse.com
Rules for classification: 1) points; 2) goal difference; 3) number of goals scored.
(C) Champions

==== Finals ====
Semi-finals
1 | Bayswater City | 0
2 | Perth SC | 5
3 | Balcatta | 3
4 | Sorrento | 1

Preliminary final
1 | Bayswater City | 3
3 | Balcatta | 2

Grand final
1 | Bayswater City | 1
2 | Perth SC | 0

== Results ==
=== ACT ===
| Home \ Away | BEL | CAN | CAC | CAO | COO | FFA | MON | TUG | WOD |
|---|---|---|---|---|---|---|---|---|---|
| Belconnen United | | 2–2 | 4–0 | 1–1 | 2–4 | 3–2 | 5–2 | 3–1 | 2–0 |
| Canberra | 0–2 | | 5–0 | 2–4 | 7–3 | 6–1 | 5–2 | 7–0 | 4–0 |
| Canberra City | 1–7 | 2–0 | | 1–6 | 0–8 | 1–0 | 1–3 | 5–3 | 0–1 |
| Canberra Olympic | 3–1 | 1–0 | 3–3 | | 0–4 | 5–2 | 6–1 | 4–1 | 0–2 |
| Cooma | 3–0 | 2–1 | 2–1 | 2–3 | | 5–0 | 5–2 | 4–0 | 3–0 |
| FFA Centre of Excellence | 1–4 | 4–1 | 3–1 | 2–1 | 2–2 | | 5–1 | 4–2 | 0–1 |
| Monaro Panthers | 1–10 | 3–7 | 1–0 | 1–1 | 3–1 | 2–4 | | 1–5 | 1–1 |
| Tuggeranong United | 1–3 | 1–3 | 1–0 | 3–2 | 0–3 | 2–4 | 2–1 | | 1–3 |
| Woden Valley | 2–4 | 1–5 | 3–0 | 2–1 | 1–3 | 2–4 | 0–1 | 1–2 | |

Updated to match(es) played on 24 August 2014. Source: foxsportspulse.com
Legend: Blue = home team win; Yellow = draw; Red = away team win.

=== NSW ===
| Home \ Away | API | BLC | BLS | BWE | MAN | MAR | ROC | SCW | STG | SUT | SYO | SYU |
|---|---|---|---|---|---|---|---|---|---|---|---|---|
| APIA Leichhardt Tigers | | 1–5 | 2–1 | 2–3 | 2–2 | 0–2 | 0–0 | 0–0 | 3–1 | 2–2 | 1–3 | 1–1 |
| Blacktown City | 3–3 | | 2–1 | 4–1 | 2–1 | 0–1 | 0–2 | 3–0 | 2–0 | 1–0 | 0–1 | 0–0 |
| Blacktown Spartans | 1–3 | 0–7 | | 3–2 | 4–1 | 2–1 | 5–1 | 3–3 | 6–0 | 6–1 | 0–1 | 1–0 |
| Bonnyrigg White Eagles | 4–0 | 1–0 | 2–3 | | 3–0 | 4–0 | 0–2 | 2–2 | 3–0 | 1–0 | 1–0 | 2–1 |
| Manly United | 1–1 | 3–1 | 3–0 | 1–2 | | 0–1 | 0–1 | 1–0 | 4–0 | 0–4 | 2–2 | 1–0 |
| Marconi Stallions | 1–0 | 0–4 | 2–3 | 1–2 | 3–0 | | 0–1 | 1–1 | 1–2 | 1–2 | 1–2 | 1–1 |
| Rockdale City Suns | 0–2 | 2–4 | 0–1 | 0–1 | 1–3 | 1–1 | | 1–0 | 1–0 | 3–0 | 1–0 | 0–0 |
| South Coast Wolves | 5–1 | 0–5 | 0–3 | 0–1 | 6–1 | 4–1 | 3–1 | | 0–2 | 1–0 | 1–1 | 1–0 |
| St George | 2–2 | 0–2 | 1–6 | 1–1 | 4–3 | 0–2 | 1–4 | 0–2 | | 0–3 | 0–0 | 0–0 |
| Sutherland Sharks | 4–5 | 3–4 | 1–2 | 1–3 | 3–1 | 3–2 | 0–0 | 2–1 | 2–1 | | 2–3 | 4–0 |
| Sydney Olympic | 6–1 | 1–2 | 1–3 | 0–1 | 3–1 | 2–2 | 2–1 | 1–1 | 0–2 | 2–3 | | 2–1 |
| Sydney United | 3–0 | 1–0 | 1–0 | 1–0 | 2–3 | 2–3 | 1–3 | 5–1 | 2–1 | 3–3 | 0–2 | |

Updated to match(es) played on 14 August 2014. Source: foxsportspulse.com
Legend: Blue = home team win; Yellow = draw; Red = away team win.

=== Northern NSW ===
| Home \ Away | ADA | BRO | CHA | EDG | HAM | LAK | LAM | NEW | SOU | WES |
|---|---|---|---|---|---|---|---|---|---|---|
| Adamstown Rosebud | | 2–3 | 1–1 | 1–0 | 2–1 | 5–2 | 0–5 | 0–5 | 3–2 | 1–4 |
| Broadmeadow Magic | 3–0 | | 3–0 | 0–2 | 1–2 | 3–0 | 0–2 | 0–1 | 1–2 | 0–0 |
| Charlestown City Blues | 4–1 | 2–0 | | 1–1 | 0–0 | 2–1 | 1–0 | 5–0 | 4–1 | 3–3 |
| Edgeworth Eagles | 1–1 | 4–1 | 7–0 | | 1–1 | 1–0 | 1–2 | 2–0 | 2–1 | 2–0 |
| Hamilton Olympic | 1–0 | 3–1 | 0–1 | 2–0 | | 4–1 | 2–2 | 2–2 | 4–2 | 3–0 |
| Lake Macquarie City | 0–2 | 0–3 | 3–1 | 1–1 | 5–1 | | 0–3 | 2–2 | 1–1 | 2–3 |
| Lambton Jaffas | 2–0 | 1–3 | 1–3 | 0–0 | 4–0 | 5–2 | | 2–0 | 1–2 | 1–2 |
| Newcastle Jets Youth | 5–1 | 3–0 | 3–2 | 5–1 | 1–1 | 1–2 | 2–1 | | 2–0 | 5–2 |
| South Cardiff | 1–3 | 1–1 | 1–0 | 0–0 | 2–1 | 3–2 | 2–3 | 1–4 | | 1–2 |
| Weston Workers | 1–1 | 2–1 | 4–1 | 3–2 | 3–2 | 3–1 | 2–2 | 1–1 | 0–1 | |

Updated to match(es) played on 11 August 2014. Source: foxsportspulse.com
Legend: Blue = home team win; Yellow = draw; Red = away team win.

=== Queensland ===
| Home \ Away | BRC | BRR | BRS | FAR | HMA | MOR | NOR | OLY | PAL | RED | SOU | SUN | WES |
|---|---|---|---|---|---|---|---|---|---|---|---|---|---|
| Brisbane City | | 2–4 | 2–1 | 2–1 | 0–0 | 0–2 | 2–1 | 3–2 | 0–3 | 2–2 | 5–1 | 1–0 | 3–1 |
| Brisbane Roar Youth | 3–2 | | 1–1 | 2–5 | 3–2 | 3–5 | 5–1 | 1–3 | 1–0 | 1–2 | 4–0 | 0–5 | 2–6 |
| Brisbane Strikers | 3–2 | 2–0 | | 0–2 | 3–0 | 4–2 | 2–2 | 3–2 | 2–3 | 2–1 | 3–0 | 4–2 | 4–3 |
| Far North Queensland | 3–2 | 1–8 | 3–0 | | 2–0 | 2–0 | 6–2 | 2–1 | 0–3 | 2–2 | 5–1 | 2–0 | 3–1 |
| Harimau Muda | 0–0 | 1–1 | 1–2 | 2–3 | | 3–3 | 4–1 | 2–2 | 3–4 | 2–3 | 4–3 | 2–0 | 4–1 |
| Moreton Bay United | 4–3 | 1–1 | 2–4 | 9–2 | 3–3 | | 3–1 | 4–4 | 2–4 | 3–0 | 9–0 | 4–2 | 5–2 |
| Northern Fury | 0–1 | 2–1 | 4–0 | 1–1 | 0–1 | 1–2 | | 0–4 | 2–5 | 2–2 | 8–0 | 2–3 | 0–2 |
| Olympic FC | 3–1 | 2–2 | 2–3 | 4–3 | 1–2 | 5–1 | 1–1 | | 2–2 | 2–1 | 5–0 | 2–1 | 3–0 |
| Palm Beach | 0–1 | 3–0 | 0–0 | 1–1 | 6–0 | 1–0 | 1–0 | 1–9 | | 4–2 | 5–0 | 4–0 | 4–3 |
| Redlands United | 2–2 | 3–0 | 2–0 | 4–0 | 2–5 | 5–4 | 1–2 | 0–2 | 1–1 | | 4–3 | 1–5 | 5–2 |
| South West Queensland Thunder | 0–6 | 0–1 | 0–8 | 0–6 | 0–5 | 0–7 | 0–3 | 2–6 | 0–7 | 0–0 | | 1–3 | 1–4 |
| Sunshine Coast | 1–0 | 2–0 | 0–1 | 1–4 | 2–1 | 2–0 | 0–0 | 1–2 | 0–5 | 1–2 | 1–0 | | 3–1 |
| Western Pride | 0–2 | 0–1 | 4–1 | 2–5 | 0–4 | 1–3 | 1–2 | 1–3 | 0–6 | 1–5 | 3–0 | 0–4 | |

Updated to match(es) played on 2 September 2014. Source: foxsportspulse.com
Legend: Blue = home team win; Yellow = draw; Red = away team win.

=== South Australia ===
| Home \ Away | ABE | ACI | ACM | ARA | CAM | CRO | CUM | NOR | PAR | SOU | WEA | WES | WTB | WHI |
|---|---|---|---|---|---|---|---|---|---|---|---|---|---|---|
| Adelaide Blue Eagles | | 3–1 | 1–2 | 0–2 | 0–0 | 2–2 | 2–0 | 0–2 | 0–1 | 1–1 | 3–2 | 2–0 | 2–1 | 5–2 |
| Adelaide City | 0–3 | | 3–0 | 1–0 | 0–1 | 1–3 | 5–0 | 0–2 | 2–1 | 3–0 | 1–2 | 5–2 | 3–0 | 1–5 |
| Adelaide Comets | 0–2 | 2–3 | | 4–2 | 5–1 | 0–3 | 5–2 | 1–4 | 2–4 | 0–0 | 3–1 | 3–1 | 1–4 | 2–1 |
| Adelaide Raiders | 0–2 | 0–2 | 2–3 | | 0–2 | 1–4 | 2–1 | 1–3 | 2–1 | 1–1 | 0–1 | 2–1 | 2–0 | 1–1 |
| Campbelltown City | 1–2 | 1–0 | 1–3 | 3–0 | | 2–4 | 1–0 | 1–5 | 0–2 | 0–4 | 0–1 | 0–2 | 2–0 | 2–1 |
| Croydon Kings | 2–3 | 0–4 | 1–2 | 3–2 | 4–3 | | 1–1 | 2–3 | 1–0 | 3–0 | 3–0 | 4–1 | 0–0 | 4–4 |
| Cumberland United | 1–2 | 4–3 | 4–2 | 2–0 | 1–2 | 1–2 | | 0–0 | 4–1 | 1–1 | 1–2 | 0–0 | 4–3 | 0–4 |
| North Eastern MetroStars | 4–1 | 1–0 | 1–3 | 2–0 | 0–2 | 2–0 | 4–1 | | 6–0 | 0–0 | 2–1 | 0–0 | 2–1 | 1–1 |
| Para Hills Knights | 2–5 | 2–4 | 3–0 | 0–1 | 1–5 | 1–3 | 2–1 | 1–2 | | 1–1 | 1–1 | 3–0 | 1–0 | 4–3 |
| South Adelaide | 2–4 | 2–2 | 1–2 | 0–0 | 1–2 | 1–2 | 2–1 | 1–7 | 3–0 | | 2–4 | 2–0 | 2–2 | 0–1 |
| West Adelaide | 2–1 | 1–1 | 3–1 | 3–1 | 1–1 | 3–2 | 2–2 | 2–0 | 2–1 | 1–0 | | 6–0 | 5–0 | 1–2 |
| Western Strikers | 0–2 | 1–0 | 0–2 | 0–1 | 0–2 | 1–2 | 1–2 | 0–3 | 4–0 | 1–1 | 1–3 | | 0–1 | 1–4 |
| West Torrens Birkalla | 1–4 | 0–2 | 0–0 | 2–4 | 1–1 | 0–2 | 4–1 | 0–5 | 3–0 | 1–0 | 4–4 | 2–1 | | 5–1 |
| White City | 2–0 | 0–2 | 0–5 | 1–1 | 5–3 | 2–4 | 2–0 | 0–2 | 0–1 | 0–1 | 1–2 | 1–1 | 3–1 | |

Updated to match(es) played on 16 August 2014. Source: foxsportspulse.com
Legend: Blue = home team win; Yellow = draw; Red = away team win.

=== Tasmania ===
| Home \ Away | DEV | GLE | HOB | KIN | LAU | NOR | OLY | SOU | DEV | GLE | HOB | KIN | LAU | NOR | OLY | SOU |
|---|---|---|---|---|---|---|---|---|---|---|---|---|---|---|---|---|
| Devonport City | | 2–0 | 2–0 | 8–1 | 5–2 | 2–3 | 1–2 | 1–4 | | 3–0 | | | | 1–1 | 1–2 | |
| Glenorchy Knights | 2–2 | | 0–4 | 2–4 | 4–1 | 1–3 | 0–1 | 1–8 | | | 1–3 | 2–4 | | | 1–1 | 0–5 |
| Hobart Zebras | 2–0 | 5–2 | | 2–3 | 12–0 | 4–0 | 4–1 | 3–0 | 4–0 | | | 2–0 | | 2–2 | | |
| Kingborough Lions United | 1–0 | 2–3 | 0–3 | | 5–5 | 0–8 | 2–4 | 1–4 | 3–6 | | | | 1–2 | | | 1–6 |
| Launceston City | 3–7 | 2–6 | 4–2 | 1–3 | | 1–4 | 0–3 | 0–8 | 2–3 | 2–1 | 0–2 | | | 0–2 | | |
| Northern Rangers | 2–0 | 2–1 | 0–4 | 7–1 | 3–0 | | 1–1 | 1–6 | | 3–1 | | 2–1 | | | 0–1 | |
| Olympia | 5–1 | 5–0 | 0–1 | 6–2 | 3–1 | 4–3 | | 0–3 | | | 2–4 | 5–0 | 2–1 | | | 0–4 |
| South Hobart | 4–0 | 3–0 | 3–0 | 6–0 | 6–2 | 1–3 | 4–2 | | 6–2 | | 0–0 | | 4–0 | 4–1 | | |

Updated to match(es) played on 30 August 2014. Source: foxsportspulse.com
Legend: Blue = home team win; Yellow = draw; Red = away team win.

=== Victoria ===
| Home \ Away | BAL | BEN | DAN | GOU | GRE | HEI | HUM | MEL | NOR | OAK | PAS | POR | SOU | WER |
|---|---|---|---|---|---|---|---|---|---|---|---|---|---|---|
| Ballarat Red Devils | | 2–3 | 0–1 | 3–0 | 3–2 | 5–5 | 1–3 | 2–0 | 0–1 | 0–1 | 2–0 | 0–4 | 1–2 | 1–2 |
| Bentleigh Greens | 1–1 | | 3–1 | 2–2 | 3–1 | 1–3 | 1–1 | 1–0 | 1–2 | 1–4 | 1–1 | 5–0 | 2–1 | 4–0 |
| Dandenong Thunder | 3–1 | 0–1 | | 6–3 | 1–0 | 2–5 | 1–0 | 1–4 | 1–1 | 0–0 | 1–2 | 1–3 | 0–1 | 0–3 |
| Goulburn Valley Suns | 2–3 | 1–1 | 0–4 | | 3–2 | 2–6 | 2–6 | 1–1 | 1–3 | 0–1 | 0–2 | 1–2 | 1–4 | 3–4 |
| Green Gully | 2–1 | 3–2 | 2–2 | 2–1 | | 1–1 | 0–1 | 1–0 | 6–2 | 1–5 | 2–3 | 1–2 | 3–5 | 4–0 |
| Heidelberg United | 4–2 | 2–2 | 0–1 | 5–0 | 4–0 | | 2–0 | 1–0 | 1–1 | 1–1 | 3–2 | 0–0 | 0–3 | 2–2 |
| Hume City | 0–1 | 0–3 | 1–0 | 4–1 | 0–3 | 0–2 | | 2–0 | 0–1 | 0–2 | 3–0 | 2–1 | 0–3 | 3–0 |
| Melbourne Knights | 4–2 | 2–0 | 1–2 | 3–0 | 4–3 | 0–2 | 0–1 | | 3–2 | 1–0 | 2–1 | 3–1 | 0–1 | 1–2 |
| Northcote City | 1–3 | 2–3 | 1–3 | 3–0 | 0–1 | 1–0 | 0–2 | 1–1 | | 1–1 | 1–1 | 2–3 | 1–1 | 4–1 |
| Oakleigh Cannons | 2–0 | 2–0 | 6–0 | 4–1 | 6–1 | 2–1 | 2–0 | 3–1 | 1–1 | | 3–0 | 4–0 | 3–0 | 2–0 |
| Pascoe Vale | 2–2 | 0–0 | 0–0 | 3–0 | 1–0 | 2–1 | 4–2 | 0–2 | 0–1 | 2–0 | | 1–1 | 0–3 | 0–2 |
| Port Melbourne | 3–1 | 2–4 | 2–2 | 1–0 | 1–1 | 0–4 | 1–1 | 0–1 | 0–1 | 2–2 | 0–2 | | 2–3 | 1–1 |
| South Melbourne | 2–0 | 2–1 | 5–0 | 1–1 | 1–0 | 3–0 | 2–0 | 4–3 | 2–1 | 2–2 | 1–0 | 2–1 | | 4–0 |
| Werribee City | 1–3 | 0–1 | 2–1 | 1–3 | 0–3 | 0–0 | 2–1 | 2–4 | 1–3 | 0–1 | 1–1 | 2–0 | 0–1 | |

Updated to match(es) played on 14 September 2014. Source: foxsportspulse.com
Legend: Blue = home team win; Yellow = draw; Red = away team win.

=== Western Australia ===
| Home \ Away | ARM | BAL | BAY | COC | ECU | FLO | ING | PER | PEG | SOR | STI | SUB |
|---|---|---|---|---|---|---|---|---|---|---|---|---|
| Armadale | | 2–4 | 0–2 | 0–2 | 0–3 | 1–6 | 1–6 | 0–3 | 1–1 | 1–2 | 0–0 | 2–1 |
| Balcatta | 2–1 | | 2–0 | 3–0 | 1–1 | 0–1 | 2–0 | 1–2 | 4–0 | 5–0 | 3–0 | 1–0 |
| Bayswater City | 1–0 | 5–2 | | 2–4 | 2–0 | 3–0 | 3–2 | 1–1 | 2–1 | 0–1 | 1–0 | 5–2 |
| Cockburn City | 5–1 | 1–2 | 4–2 | | 0–3 | 0–5 | 0–0 | 1–1 | 2–1 | 3–1 | 0–1 | 4–1 |
| ECU Joondalup | 2–1 | 0–2 | 0–1 | 3–3 | | 1–4 | 5–2 | 0–4 | 5–1 | 1–3 | 1–2 | 2–1 |
| Floreat Athena | 2–1 | 4–1 | 1–3 | 0–3 | 1–4 | | 3–0 | 1–4 | 0–5 | 0–2 | 2–1 | 3–0 |
| Inglewood United | 1–1 | 1–4 | 0–0 | 1–4 | 3–0 | 4–4 | | 1–4 | 3–1 | 1–2 | 1–5 | 4–0 |
| Perth SC | 7–0 | 1–0 | 0–2 | 2–1 | 2–1 | 4–1 | 3–3 | | 3–1 | 1–2 | 1–1 | 2–0 |
| Perth Glory Youth | 6–0 | 1–3 | 0–6 | 5–5 | 0–2 | 1–4 | 4–2 | 1–1 | | 2–3 | 0–2 | 1–4 |
| Sorrento | 1–1 | 2–1 | 1–1 | 2–3 | 1–1 | 3–2 | 4–2 | 3–5 | 6–1 | | 2–2 | 2–3 |
| Stirling Lions | 5–2 | 3–2 | 1–4 | 0–3 | 3–1 | 2–0 | 3–0 | 1–2 | 5–1 | 1–1 | | 3–1 |
| Subiaco AFC | 1–0 | 0–2 | 0–5 | 3–3 | 0–3 | 3–2 | 3–4 | 0–1 | 1–2 | 1–4 | 0–0 | |

Updated to match(es) played on 23 August 2014. Source: foxsportspulse.com
Legend: Blue = home team win; Yellow = draw; Red = away team win.

== Final Series ==
The winner of each league competition (top of the table) in the NPL competed in a single match knockout tournament to decide the National Premier Leagues Champion for 2014. The participants were matched up based on geographical proximity. Home advantage for the semi-finals and final was based on a formula relating to time of winning (normal time, extra time or penalties), goals scored and allowed, and yellow/red cards. North Eastern MetroStars won the grand final, and also qualified for the 2015 FFA Cup Round of 32.

| Club | Qualified From | Participation |
|---|---|---|
| Cooma | (Australian Capital Territory) ACT | 1st |
| Bonnyrigg White Eagles | (New South Wales) NSW | 1st |
| Weston Workers | (New South Wales) Northern NSW | 1st |
| Palm Beach | Queensland | 1st |
| North Eastern MetroStars | South Australia | 1st |
| South Hobart | Tasmania | 2nd |
| South Melbourne | (Victoria (state)) Victoria | 1st |
| Bayswater City | Western Australia | 1st |

Quarter-finals
(Australian Capital Territory) Cooma | 1
(New South Wales) Bonnyrigg White Eagles | 6
(New South Wales) Weston Workers | 1
(Queensland) Palm Beach | 2
(Tasmania) South Hobart | 0
(Victoria (state)) South Melbourne | 1
(Western Australia) Bayswater City | 0 (3)
(South Australia) North Eastern MetroStars (p) | 0 (4)

Semi-finals
(New South Wales) Bonnyrigg White Eagles | 1
(Queensland) Palm Beach | 0
(Victoria (state)) South Melbourne | 1
(South Australia) North Eastern MetroStars | 2

Grand final
(New South Wales) Bonnyrigg White Eagles | 0
(South Australia) North Eastern MetroStars | 1

=== Quarter-finals ===
20 September 2014
19:00 AEST

| Weston Workers (New South Wales) | 1–2 | (Queensland) Palm Beach |
|---|---|---|
| Thornton 33' | Report | Lucas 57' (pen.); Kyle 73' |

Rockwell Automation Park, Weston
Referee: Glen Peterkin

20 September 2014
14:30 AEST

| Cooma (Australian Capital Territory) | 1–6 | (New South Wales) Bonnyrigg White Eagles |
|---|---|---|
| Lando 11' | Report | Fox 22'; Zonjic 54'; Peterson 57', 71'; Diaz 63'; Doyle 79' |

AIS Athletics Field, Canberra
Attendance: 288
Referee: Luke Withell

20 September 2014
13:30 AEST

| South Hobart (Tasmania) | 0–1 | (Victoria (state)) South Melbourne |
|---|---|---|
| | Report | Reed 6' |

South Hobart Ground, Hobart
Attendance: 800
Referee: Brenton Kopra

20 September 2014
14:00 AWST

| Bayswater City (Western Australia) | 0–0 (a.e.t.) | (South Australia) North Eastern MetroStars |
|---|---|---|
| | Report |
Penalties
| Isaia (penalty scored); Howarth (penalty scored); Hargreaves (penalty scored); Mitchinson (penalty missed); Kay (penalty missed) | 3–4 | (penalty scored) van Dommele; (penalty scored) Barbiero; (penalty scored) Menechella; (penalty scored) Mitris |

Frank Drago Reserve, Perth
Attendance: 250
Referee: Adam Fielding

=== Semi-finals ===
27 September 2014
18:00 AEST

| Bonnyrigg White Eagles (New South Wales) | 1–0 | (Queensland) Palm Beach |
|---|---|---|
| Younis 39' | Report |

Bonnyrigg Sports Club, Sydney
Referee: Kurt Ams

28 September 2014
15:00 AEST

| South Melbourne (Victoria (state)) | 1–2 | (South Australia) North Eastern MetroStars |
|---|---|---|
| Lujic 36' | Report | Musa 11' (o.g.); Tunbridge 56' |

Lakeside Stadium, Melbourne
Referee: Jonathan Barreiro

=== Grand final ===
4 October 2014
16:00 AEST

| Bonnyrigg White Eagles (New South Wales) | 0–1 | (South Australia) North Eastern MetroStars |
|---|---|---|
| | Report | Barbiero 3' |

Lambert Park, Sydney
Referee: Patrick Chaplin

== Individual honours ==
David Vranković from Bonnyrigg White Eagles won the John Kosmina Medal for the best player in the NPL grand final.
