= 2014 FFSA season =

Football Federation South Australia
- Season: 2014
- Champions: Croydon Kings

The 2014 Football Federation South Australia season was the 108th season of soccer in South Australia, and the second under the National Premier Leagues format.

== League tables ==
=== 2014 National Premier Leagues South Australia ===
NPL South Australia
- Season: 2014
- Champions: Croydon Kings
- Premiers: North Eastern MetroStars
- Relegated: Cumberland United; Western Strikers
- Matches: 182
- Goals: 595 (3.27 per match)
- Top goalscorer: Perry Mitris (22 goals)
- Biggest home win: -
- Biggest away win: -
- Highest scoring: -

The National Premier League South Australia 2014 season was the second season under the new competition format in South Australia. It was played over 26 rounds, beginning on 21 February with the regular season concluding on 16 August 2014. The league consisted of 14 teams across the State of South Australia, all playing each other twice for a total of 26 rounds, with the final series winners qualifying for the 2014 National Premier Leagues Finals and the bottom two at the end of the year being relegated to the 2015 FFSA State League.

West Adelaide and South Adelaide joined from the 2013 FFSA State League.

==== League Table ====
Pos	Team	Pld	W	D	L	GF	GA	GD	Pts	Qualification or relegation
1	North Eastern MetroStars	26	19	4	3	63	19	+44	61	Qualified for the 2014 National Premier Leagues Finals
2	West Adelaide	26	16	5	5	56	34	+22	53	Qualified for the 2014 South Australia Finals
3	Croydon Kings (C)	26	16	4	6	61	40	+21	52	Qualified for the 2014 South Australia Finals
4	Adelaide Blue Eagles	26	15	3	8	50	34	+16	48	Qualified for the 2014 South Australia Finals
5	Adelaide Comets	26	14	2	10	53	48	+5	44	Qualified for the 2014 South Australia Finals
6	Adelaide City	26	13	3	10	47	33	+14	42	Qualified for the 2014 South Australia Finals
7	Campbelltown City	26	12	3	11	39	43	−4	39	
8	White City	26	9	5	12	47	50	−3	32	
9	Para Hills Knights	26	9	2	15	34	55	−21	29	
10	Adelaide Raiders	26	8	4	14	28	43	−15	28	
11	West Torrens Birkalla	26	7	5	14	36	52	−16	26	
12	South Adelaide	26	5	10	11	29	40	−11	25	
13	Cumberland United (R)	26	5	6	15	32	53	−21	21	Relegated to 2015 NPL State League
14	Western Strikers (R)	26	4	4	18	20	51	−31	16	Relegated to 2015 NPL State League

Source: foxsportspulse.com
Rules for classification: 1) points; 2) goal difference; 3) number of goals scored.
(C) Champions; (R) Relegated

==== Finals ====
Elimination finals
3	Croydon Kings	4
6	Adelaide City	0
4	Adelaide Blue Eagles	3
5	Adelaide Comets	0

Semifinals
1	West Adelaide	0
2	North Eastern MetroStars	2
Croydon Kings	4
Adelaide Blue Eagles	1

Preliminary final
West Adelaide	1 (4)
Croydon Kings	1 (5)

Grand final
North Eastern MetroStars	1
Croydon Kings	2

=== 2014 NPL State League ===
NPL State League
- Season: 2014
- Promoted: Port Adelaide Pirates; Modbury Jets
- Matches: 210
- Goals: 784 (3.73 per match)
- Top goalscorer: -
- Biggest home win: -
- Biggest away win: -
- Highest scoring: -

The 2014 NPL State League was the second edition of the new NPL State League as the second level domestic association football competition in South Australia (and third level within Australia overall). 15 teams competed, all playing each other twice for a total of 28 rounds, with the league and playoff winners at the end of the year being promoted to the 2015 NPL South Australia.

Pos	Team	Pld	W	D	L	GF	GA	GD	Pts	Qualification or relegation
1	Port Adelaide Pirates (P)	28	21	4	3	77	29	+48	67	Promoted to the 2015 NPL South Australia
2	Salisbury United	28	19	6	3	60	28	+32	63	Qualified for the 2014 NPL State League Promotion Playoff
3	Modbury Jets (P)	28	17	4	7	90	32	+58	55	Promoted to the 2015 NPL South Australia
4	Adelaide Olympic	28	17	3	8	58	38	+20	54	Qualified for the 2014 NPL State League Promotion Playoff
5	Playford City	28	17	2	9	78	44	+34	53	Qualified for the 2014 NPL State League Promotion Playoff
6	Adelaide Hills Hawks	28	15	4	9	62	31	+31	49	
7	Western Toros	28	13	4	11	70	44	+26	43	
8	The Cove	28	11	6	11	42	52	−10	39	
9	Seaford Rangers	28	10	5	13	58	59	−1	35	
10	Eastern United	28	8	7	13	42	48	−6	31	
11	Sturt Lions	28	8	5	15	32	51	−19	29	
12	Adelaide Cobras	28	7	6	15	34	67	−33	27	
13	Northern Demons	28	6	6	16	32	61	−29	24	
14	Gawler Eagles	28	6	1	21	33	108	−75	19	
15	Noarlunga United	28	2	3	23	16	92	−76	9	

(P) Promoted

==== Promotion Playoff ====
Semifinals
2	Salisbury United	1
5	Playford City Patriots	2
3	Modbury Jets	7
4	Adelaide Olympic	2

Final
3	Modbury Jets	1
5	Playford City Patriots	0

=== 2014 Women's Premier League ===
Women's Premier League
- Season: 2014
- Premiers: Adelaide City FC

The 9 teams played a double round-robin for a total of 16 games.

Pos	Team	Pld	W	D	L	GF	GA	GD	Pts
1	Adelaide City (C)	16	14	1	1	53	13	+40	43
2	Metro United	16	12	2	2	56	24	+32	38
3	West Adelaide	16	12	1	3	58	25	+33	37
4	Sturt Marion	16	9	2	5	43	25	+18	29
5	Cumberland United	16	5	3	8	25	36	−11	18
6	Para Hills Knights	16	4	3	9	19	30	−11	15
7	FFSA U15s	16	4	1	11	25	42	−17	13
8	Adelaide University	16	3	3	10	32	41	−9	12
9	Fulham United	16	0	2	14	12	87	−75	2

Source: sportstg.com
Rules for classification: 1) points; 2) goal difference; 3) number of goals scored.
(C) Champions

== Cup Competitions ==
=== 2014 Federation Cup ===
South Australian soccer clubs competed in 2014 for the Federation Cup, known as the 2014 Coca-Cola Federation Cup for sponsorship reasons. Clubs entered from the NPL SA and the State League 1.

This knockout competition was won by Adelaide City.

The competition also served as the South Australian Preliminary Rounds for the 2014 FFA Cup. In addition to Adelaide City, the A-League club Adelaide United qualified for the final rounds, entering at the Round of 32.
