= Balzarini =

Balzarini is an Italian surname. Notable people with the surname include:

- Antonio Balzarini (born c. 1933), Italian racehorse owner and trainer
- Guido Balzarini (1874–1935), Italian fencer
- Luigi Balzarini (1935–2014), Italian footballer
- Rafael Spósito Balzarini (1952–2009), Uruguayan anarchist, sociologist, and journalist
