= 2013 FFSA season =

Football Federation South Australia
- Season: 2013
- Champions: Campbelltown City

The 2013 Football Federation South Australia season was the 107th season of soccer in South Australia, and the first under the National Premier Leagues format.

== League tables ==
=== 2013 National Premier Leagues SA ===
NPL South Australia
- Season: 2013
- Champions: Campbelltown City
- Premiers: MetroStars
- Relegated: Adelaide Cobras; Enfield City
- Matches: 182
- Goals: 577 (3.17 per match)
- Top goalscorer: Lloyd Owusu (20 goals)
- Biggest home win: Adelaide City 5-0 Adelaide Cobras (30 March 2013); Campbelltown City 5-0 Croydon Kings (27 July 2013)
- Biggest away win: Enfield City 0-7 Adelaide City FC (11 May 2013)
- Highest scoring: Adelaide Comets 1-7 Para Hills Knights (18 May 2013)

The National Premier League South Australia 2013 season was played by 14 teams over 26 rounds, from February to August 2013.

==== League table ====
Pos	Team	Pld	W	D	L	GF	GA	GD	Pts	Qualification or relegation
1	North Eastern MetroStars	26	20	2	4	48	16	+32	62	Qualified for the 2013 SA Finals
2	Adelaide Blue Eagles	26	14	7	5	48	27	+21	49	Qualified for the 2013 SA Finals
3	Adelaide City	26	15	3	8	58	29	+29	48	Qualified for the 2013 SA Finals
4	Campbelltown City (C)	26	13	7	6	50	28	+22	46	Qualified for the 2013 National Premier Leagues Finals
5	Adelaide Raiders	26	12	5	9	45	40	+5	41	Qualified for the 2013 SA Finals
6	Cumberland United	26	11	8	7	38	39	−1	41	Qualified for the 2013 SA Finals
7	West Torrens Birkalla	26	11	5	10	44	36	+8	38	
8	Western Strikers	26	10	6	10	40	45	−5	36	
9	Para Hills Knights	26	10	5	11	47	45	+2	35	
10	White City	26	9	4	13	45	45	0	31	
11	Croydon Kings	26	7	7	12	32	45	−13	28	
12	Adelaide Comets	26	6	6	14	35	54	−19	24	
13	Adelaide Cobras (R)	26	5	4	17	28	62	−34	19	Relegated to the 2014 FFSA State League
14	Enfield City (R)	26	2	5	19	19	66	−47	−19 (Note: Enfield City were deducted 30 points after the FFSA found eight players 'did not meet the definition of an amateur player based on club player payment agreements'.)	Disbanded at end of season

Source: sportingpulse.com
(C) Champions; (R) Relegated

==== Finals ====
Elimination finals
3	Adelaide City	0
6	Cumberland United	1
4	Campbelltown City	3
5	Adelaide Raiders	1

Semifinals
1	North Eastern MetroStars	1	0 (1)
2	Adelaide Blue Eagles	1	1 (2)
Cumberland United	2
Campbelltown City	3

Preliminary final
North Eastern MetroStars	0
Campbelltown City	1

Grand final
Adelaide Blue Eagles	1
Campbelltown City	2

=== 2013 NPL State League ===
NPL State League
- Season: 2013
- Champions: West Adelaide
- Promoted: West Adelaide; South Adelaide
- Matches: 240
- Goals: 989 (4.12 per match)
- Top goalscorer: Andrew Kaine (33 goals)
- Biggest home win: Port Adelaide Pirates 13–0 Gawler SC (11 March 2013)
- Biggest away win: Gawler SC 0–10 West Adelaide (16 March 2013)
- Highest scoring: Port Adelaide Pirates 13–0 Gawler SC (11 March 2013)

The 2013 NPL State League was the first edition of the new NPL State League as the second level domestic association football competition in South Australia. 16 teams competed, all playing each other twice for a total of 30 rounds, with the top two at the end of the year being promoted to the 2014 National Premier Leagues South Australia.

Pos	Team	Pld	W	D	L	GF	GA	GD	Pts	Qualification or relegation
1	West Adelaide (P)	30	28	2	0	95	13	+82	86	Promoted to the 2014 National Premier Leagues South Australia
2	South Adelaide (P)	30	22	3	5	73	31	+42	69	Promoted to the 2014 National Premier Leagues South Australia
3	Modbury Jets	30	20	6	4	76	34	+42	66	
4	Port Adelaide Pirates	30	21	1	8	117	46	+71	64	
5	Adelaide Olympic	30	18	2	10	87	45	+42	56	
6	Salisbury United	30	18	2	10	78	56	+22	56	
7	Adelaide Hills Hawks	30	14	5	11	73	50	+23	47	
8	Playford City	30	14	5	11	70	59	+11	47	
9	Noarlunga United	30	13	3	14	54	44	+10	42	
10	Seaford Rangers	30	11	4	15	47	85	−38	37	
11	Eastern United	30	8	9	13	42	64	−22	33	
12	Western Toros	30	9	4	17	41	80	−39	31	
13	Northern Demons	30	6	4	20	33	65	−32	22	
14	The Cove	30	5	3	22	41	74	−33	18	
15	Gawler Eagles	30	2	4	24	28	147	−119	10	
16	Sturt Lions	30	1	3	26	34	96	−62	6	

(P) Promoted

=== 2013 Women's Premier League ===
Women's Premier League
- Season: 2013
- Premiers: Adelaide City FC

The highest tier domestic football competition in South Australia for women was known for sponsorship reasons as the Adelaide Airport Women's Premier League. The 8 teams played a triple round-robin for a total of 21 games.

Pos	Team	Pld	W	D	L	GF	GA	GD	Pts
1	Adelaide City (C)	21	16	3	2	79	19	+60	51
2	Metro United	21	17	0	4	62	33	+29	51
3	Adelaide University	21	12	3	6	77	49	+28	39
4	FFSA U14/15s	21	11	2	8	82	63	+19	35
5	Fulham United	21	8	4	9	65	84	−19	28
6	Sturt Marion	21	7	4	10	36	47	−11	25
7	Para Hills Knights	21	3	1	17	25	60	−35	10
8	Cumberland United	21	0	3	18	13	84	−71	3

Source: sportstg.com
Rules for classification: 1) points; 2) goal difference; 3) number of goals scored.
(C) Champions

== Awards ==
The end of year awards were as follows:

=== National Premier Leagues SA ===
Award	Winner
Player of the Year (Note: Sergio Melta Medal)	Jim Stavrides (Cumberland United) Tony Hatzis (North Eastern MetroStars)
Golden Boot	Lloyd Owusu (White City FC)
Coach of the Year (Note: Martyn Crook Coach of the Year)	Michael Brooks (Cumberland United)
Goalkeeper of the Year (Note: Peter Nikolich Trophy)	Les Pogliacomi (Campbelltown City)
Rising Star Award (Note: John Aloisi Rising Star Award)	Luigi Ditroia (Adelaide Blue Eagles)
Referee of the Year (Note: Mike Ingham Award)	Daniel Goodwin
Young Referee of the Year (Note: Mick O'Malley Award)	Rick Schneider
Fair Play Award	Adelaide City FC

== See also ==
- 2013 National Premier Leagues
- Football Federation South Australia
