= Soccer in South Australia =

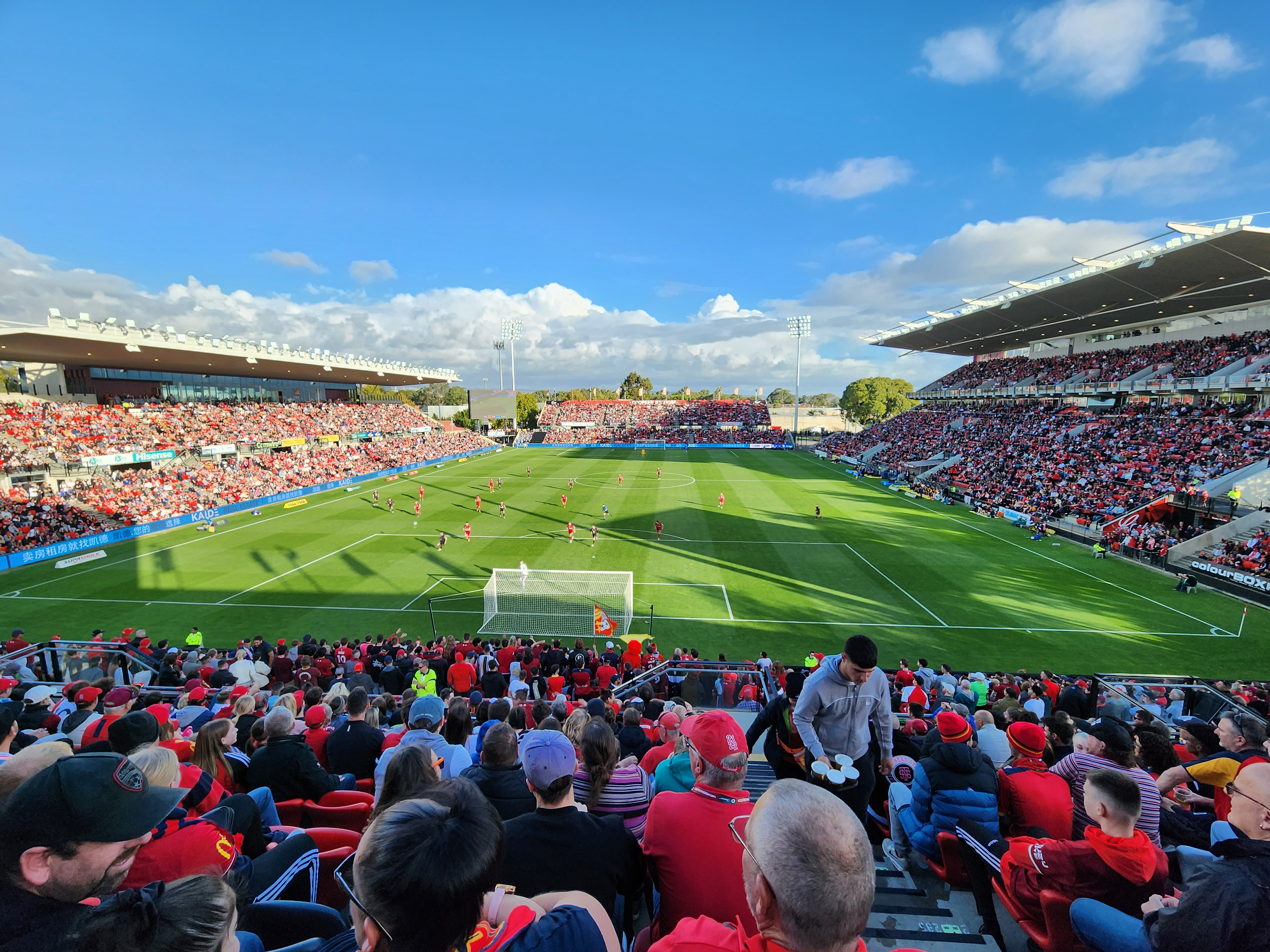
- Fans at an Adelaide United match in 2023
- Governing body: Football South Australia
- Nicknames: Soccer, football
- First played: 20 July 1893; 133 years ago Adelaide
- Registered players: 32,072 (2025)
- Clubs: 314 (2025)

National competitions
- A-League Men; A-League Women

Club competitions
- National Premier Leagues South Australia; State League 1 South Australia; State League 2 South Australia; Women's National Premier Leagues South Australia; Women's State League South Australia

Audience records
- Single match: 53,008, Adelaide United 0–2 Liverpool (20 July 2015, Friendly)
- Season: 212,344, Adelaide United (2015–16 A-League)

Soccer in South Australia is a popular participation and spectator sport. It is primarily organised by Football South Australia, a member of Football Australia.

== National representation ==
Since 2003, South Australia has been solely represented by Adelaide United. Initially debuting in the final season of the National Soccer League, Adelaide United became one of the founding members of the A-League, now A-League Men. Prior to their foundation, Adelaide City and West Adelaide represented South Australia in the National Soccer League. Adelaide City withdrew from the league in 2003, which made way for Adelaide United to take its place. West Adelaide ran into financial in the 90s, causing it to drop in and out of the national league, before folding.

Outside of the national league representatives, 16 other clubs have also represented the state in the national Australia Cup (1962–1968), NSL Cup, National Premier Leagues and the current Australia Cup competitions; Adelaide Blue Eagles, Adelaide Comets, Adelaide Croatia Raiders, Adelaide Olympic, Campbelltown City, Croydon FC, Cumberland United, FK Beograd, Modbury Jets, Noarlunga United, North Eastern MetroStars, Para Hills Knights, Salisbury United, West Torrens Birkalla and the now defunct teams; Enfield City, and Seacliffe Austria.

== Participation ==
Figures represent players involved in "outdoor affiliated football", as described by Football South Australia.

Year	Players		Clubs	
2018	24,287		291	
2019	35,069	▲44.4%	291	Steady
2020	27,994	▼20.2%	289	▼0.7%
2021	35,006	▲25.0%	300	▲3.8%
2022	36,737	▲4.9%	305	▲1.7%
2023	40,228	▲9.5%	308	▲1.0%
2024	30,087	▼25.2%	308	Steady
2025	32,072	▲6.6%	314	▲1.9%

== State competitions ==
Outdoor group portrait of the RAAF soccer team from No 4 Initial Training School at Victor Harbor, South Australia 1941.

The first tier of South Australian football is the National Premier Leagues South Australia. Founded in 1903 under the South Australian British Football Association, the competition has been played every year since, outside of 1916–18 for World War I and 1942 for World War II.

Known as the First Division from its inception up until 1993, it settled to between 8 and 12 teams in its later years, as well as having a finals competition. In 1994, eight teams took part in the inaugural Premier League. With the South Australian Soccer Federation becoming the Football Federation South Australia, the FFSA Super League became the premier competition in the state. In 2013 with the national curriculum being implemented by Football Federation Australia, the first division would become the National Premier Leagues South Australia. Initially contested by 14 teams, 12 teams currently compete. Below the National Premier Leagues is State League One, also contested by 12 teams, and State League Two, which consists of north and south conferences of 10 teams each.

The Women's National Premier Leagues South Australia is the first division of women's soccer in the state. It is currently contested by ten teams, with a five team finals series. Below it is the Women's State League, also contested by 10 teams, it is the only South Australian competition without a finals series, instead having a promotion/relegation playoff between the second placed team and the ninth placed team from the WNPL.

== Cup competitions ==
The main knockout tournament in South Australia is the Federation Cup. Founded in 1907 as the Webb-Harris Cup, the competition has been contested every year, outside of the hiatuses of World War I and II, 1948–49 and 2020. All teams from the National Premier Leagues South Australia, State League One and State League Two must participate. Teams from the South Australian Amateur Soccer League and South Australian Regional Leagues can nominate to enter. Since 2014, the competition has served as the preliminary rounds to the Australia Cup.

Prior to 2013, many secondary cup competitions took place, including the Night Series, founded in 1953, its most notable stint was as the Ampol Cup from 1960 until 1994. The Top Four Cup, known as the Coca-Cola Cup, which was contested by the top four teams from the first division season. It first took place in 1970, and was later replaced by an official finals series in 1994.

Between 1934 and 1961, with a break for the war, the Pozza Cup was contested by teams from the first division. The lower divisions had their own editions, with the second division cup being called the Pozza Cup for its first edition in 1936, later becoming the Jaxen Cup in 1961, and the John Martins Cup from 1971, until its final edition in 1979. The third division's cup was known as the Gregory Cup from 1949 until 1959, when it was replaced with the Rowley Cup from 1956 until its demise after 1979.

Competition	Years	Notes	Most successful team
Federation Cup	1907–1915; 1919–1941; 1943–1947; 1950–2019; 2021–present	Single elimination knockout tournament contested by all Football South Australia clubs. The 35 teams (excluding Adelaide United Youth) from NPL SA, State League 1 and State League 2 are required to participate and clubs from the amateur leagues and regional leagues can apply to participate. Since 2014, it has also served as part of the preliminary rounds to the Australia Cup.: Webb-Harris Cup: 1907–1911; Cambridge Cup: 1912–1915, 1919–1925; Pelaco Cup: 1926–1941, 1943–1947, 1950–1954; Advertiser Cup: 1955–1961; Federation Cup: 1962–1972, 1978–1982, 1992–1993, 2003–2006, 2010, 2015–2019, 2021–present; Willis Cup: 1973–1977; P.G.H. Cup: 1983–1991; Dairy Vale Cup: 1994–1995; Mutual Community Cup: 1996–1998; West End Cup: 1999–2002; Best Pavers Cup: 2007–2008; Top Corner Cup: 2009; Coca-Cola Cup: 2011–2014	Adelaide City (18 titles)
Summer Night Series	1953–1995; 2001–2012	Pre-season tournament most commonly contested by the top six clubs from the previous year's first division season, and the two teams newly promoted to the first division.: Summer Night Cup: 1953–1959; Ampol Cup: 1960–1994; Fairmont Homes Cup: 1995; Summer Night Series: 2001–2002; Bianco Summer Night Series: 2003–2010; Carlsberg Cup: 2011–2012	Adelaide City (18 titles)
Top Four Cup	1970–1991	Postseason tournament contested by the top four clubs from the first division season. Replaced by an official finals series for the 1992 season.: Coca-Cola Cup: 1970–1991	West Adelaide (7 titles)
First Division Cup	1934–1940; 1946–1961	Cup competition contested by every team in the first division.: First Division Cup: 1934–1940; Pozza Cup: 1946–1961	Birkalla Rovers (5 titles)
Second Division Cup	1936–1940; 1946–1979	Cup competition contested by every team in the second division.: Second Division Cup: 1936–1940; Pozza Cup: 1946–1960; Jaxen Cup: 1961–1970; John Martins Cup: 1971–1979	
Third Division Cup	1949–1960; 1966–1979	Cup competition contested by every team in the third division.: Gregory Cup: 1949–1960; Rowley Cup: 1966–1979	

== Venues ==
In 1938, the association became the first sporting body in the Commonwealth to purchase outright, sufficient land as its own recreational ground, when they purchased Rowley Park. The purchase of the 10-acre area left the association in massive debt, as it cost a reported £76/10/6, approximately $7,700 in 2022, accounting for inflation. In the same minutes where this was reported, they also took out a £1000 loan from The Football Association, to help pay off their debt and to improve the facilities. After the redevelopments, Rowley Park could hold up to 20,000 spectators. However, the purchase of Rowley Park caused the association to lose their lease on Hindmarsh Oval. The surface of Rowley Park was unsuitable for soccer, however, and it was later leased out to be used as a speedway.

In the 1960s, Kensington Oval was redeveloped, and became the home of Adelaide Juventus. It would host soccer games until Adelaide City moved to Hindmarsh Stadium in 1986. Since then, it has been used exclusively for cricket.

In 1977, West Adelaide became one of the two clubs to represent South Australia in the National Soccer League, playing their home games at Hindmarsh Stadium. Throughout the latter part of the decade, the stadium would be upgraded from one grandstand to four, currently having a capacity of 16,000. From 1986, Adelaide City also played their home games at Hindmarsh Stadium. Both teams remained at the ground until their eventual withdrawals from the national league, where Adelaide United became the sole tenant of the stadium. The stadium also hosted Federation Cup and National Premier Leagues SA grand finals, before the completion of the State Centre for Football in 2022.

In 2021, construction began for the State Centre for Football, a facility owned by Football South Australia. It was completed in mid-2022, and hosted games in the National Premier Leagues SA, Federation Cup, Australia Cup, as well as grand finals from State League One and State League Two. The Federation holds a 99-year lease on the venue and has plans to expand the complex.

== See also ==
- Soccer in Australia
