= 1938–39 in Mandatory Palestine football =

Football in Mandatory Palestine
- Season: 1938–39

The 1938–39 season was the 12th season of competitive football in the British Mandate of Palestine.

== IFA Competitions ==
=== 1938–39 Palestine League ===
Matches of the 1938–39 Palestine League were due to be continued after the summer break. However, as the Arab revolt intensified in fall 1938 and with the High commissioner issuing restrictive orders on travel throughout Palestine, the EIFA created a two-tiered league for the Tel Aviv region, with matches played in the league counting towards the national league. The Tel Aviv League was completed on 14 January 1939 and in February 1939 a new league season began, with teams playing in regionalized divisions instead a national league.

==== League table ====
Pos	Team	Pld	W	D	L	GF	GA	GR	Pts	
1	Hapoel Tel Aviv	11	9	2	0	27	9	3.000	20	Champions
2	Maccabi Tel Aviv	11	7	3	1	44	13	3.385	17	
3	Palestine Police Force	8	5	0	3	21	17	1.235	10	
4	Hapoel Haifa	8	4	1	3	15	17	0.882	9	
5	Hakoah Tel Aviv	11	3	2	6	19	28	0.679	8	
6	Hapoel Herzliya	8	3	0	5	11	20	0.550	6	
7	Maccabi Petah Tikva	11	2	2	7	13	20	0.650	6	
8	Maccabi Nes Tziona	8	1	2	5	12	23	0.522	4	
9	Royal Air Force	8	2	0	6	10	25	0.400	4	

Updated to match(es) played on 17 January 1939. Source: IFA

=== 1939 Palestine League ===
Shortly after the previous league season was abandoned, a new season was initiated. With the Arab Revolt still raging, the league played regionally, split into Tel Aviv, Samaria and Southern regional leagues League matches were not completed by the end of the season and continued after the summer break.

=== 1939 Palestine Cup ===
Hapoel Tel Aviv, defeating Maccabi Avshalom Petah Tikva 2–1 in the final, completed a third consecutive cup triumph.

6 May 1939

Hapoel Tel Aviv	2–1	Maccabi Avshalom Petah Tikva
Fuchs 14'; Meitner 15'		Zimmett 12'

Maccabiah Stadium
Attendance: 3000
Referee: Marcus

== British-run leagues ==
British Army authorities organized leagues in Jerusalem, Haifa and Tiberias, competed by teams from the different army units, as well as several local and national cup competitions. In Haifa and Tiberias local Jewish teams (Hapoel Haifa, Maccabi Haifa, Hapoel Kfar Ata in Haifa and Hapoel Tiberias in Tiberias) participated in the leagues, due to travelling difficulties to meet other Jewish clubs.

2nd Battalion Black Watch won the Jerusalem Services and Police League, while the Haifa league was abandoned midway of the second round of fixtures.

== Maccabi Tel Aviv Tour of Australia ==
On 24 May 1938, Maccabi Tel Aviv embarked on a five-month tour of Australia, playing 19 matches throughout the tour, appearing in some matches as Palestine. Maccabi won 11 of the matches, drawn 3 and lost 5, with a goal difference of 92–49, striker Gaul Machlis scoring 28 of the goals for Maccabi.

List of matches:

- 24 June 1939, Olympic Park, Melbourne: Victoria – Maccabi Tel Aviv 1–7
- 27 June 1939, Olympic Park, Melbourne: Victoria – Maccabi Tel Aviv 0–8
- 1 July 1939, Sydney: New South Wales – Maccabi Tel Aviv 6–4
- 4 July 1939, Cessnock, New South Wales: Northern Districts – Maccabi Tel Aviv 3–1
- 8 July 1939, Sydney: Australia – Palestine 7–5
- 12 July 1939, Brisbane: Queensland – Maccabi Tel Aviv 1–5
- 15 July 1939, Brisbane: Australia – Palestine 2–1
- 17 July 1939, Ipswich: Queensland – Maccabi Tel Aviv 1–8
- 18 July 1939, Toowoomba: Queensland – Maccabi Tel Aviv 3–13
- 22 July 1939, Sydney: Australia – Palestine 1–2
- 24 July 1939, Woonona, New South Wales: Woonona XI – Maccabi Tel Aviv 2–3
- 29 July 1939, Newcastle: Australia – Palestine 4–1
- 30 July 1939, Cessnock: New South Wales – Maccabi Tel Aviv 2–2
- 5 August 1939, Melbourne: Australia – Palestine 4–4
- 8 August 1939, Melbourne: Victoria – Maccabi Tel Aviv 4–3
- 12 August 1939, Adelaide: South Australia – Maccabi Tel Aviv 2–4
- 16 August 1939, Adelaide: South Australia – Maccabi Tel Aviv 0–8
- 26 August 1939, Perth: Western Australia – Maccabi Tel Aviv 4–4
- 28 August 1939, Perth: Western Australia – Maccabi Tel Aviv 3–7

The return journey took almost a month, as the team's ship, which was headed to Singapore was rerouted to Bombay, as World War II broke out. Maccabi played two matches against local teams, winning 8–0 and 7–0, before departing via Aden and Port Said back to Palestine.

== Notable events ==
- CAM Timișoara played six matches in late January 1939, twice against Maccabi Tel Aviv, drawing 1–1 and winning 3–0; Twice against Hapoel Tel Aviv, winning 5–2 and 4–0 and once against a combined Maccabi and Hapoel Tel Aviv XI, losing 1–3, and against Maccabi Petah Tikva, winning 2–1. This was Eliezer Spiegel's debut in Maccabi Petah Tikva senior squad, at the age of 16.
