= 2003 SASF season =

South Australian Soccer Federation
- Season: 2003
- Champions: Adelaide Blue Eagles

The 2003 South Australian Soccer Federation season was the 97th season of soccer in South Australia.

== 2003 SASF Premier League ==
South Australian Premier League
- Season: 2003
- Champions: Grand Final; Adelaide Blue Eagles; Minor Premiership; North Eastern MetroStars
- Relegated: Para Hills Knights; Playford City Patriots
- Matches: 132
- Biggest home win: Enfield City 7–0 Playford City Patriots (16 August 2003)
- Biggest away win: Adelaide Blue Eagles 0–5 MetroStars (17 May 2003); Para Hills Knights 0–5 Adelaide Galaxy (19 July 2003)
- Highest scoring: White City 7–2 Playford City Patriots (12 April 2003); Para Hills Knights 5–4 Adelaide Olympic (17 May 2003) (9 goals)

The 2003 South Australian Premier League was the third last season of the SASF Premier League, the top level domestic association football competition in South Australia. It was contested by 12 teams in a single 22 round league format, each team playing all of their opponents twice.

Pos	Team	Pld	W	D	L	GF	GA	GD	Pts	Qualification or relegation
1	North Eastern MetroStars	22	17	4	1	54	19	+35	55	Qualification for Finals
2	Adelaide Raiders	22	17	3	2	62	26	+36	54	Qualification for Finals
3	Adelaide Blue Eagles (C)	22	10	4	8	24	27	−3	34	Qualification for Finals
4	Adelaide Galaxy	22	9	5	8	37	23	+14	32	Qualification for Finals
5	White City	22	9	5	8	35	30	+5	32	Qualification for Finals
6	Enfield City	22	9	4	9	41	37	+4	31	
7	Adelaide Olympic	22	8	5	9	43	46	−3	29	
8	Adelaide City	22	8	3	11	26	35	−9	27	
9	Croydon Kings	22	6	5	11	32	45	−13	23	
10	Modbury Jets	22	6	3	13	23	36	−13	21	
11	Para Hills Knights (R)	22	5	3	14	31	47	−16	18	Relegation to SASF State League
12	Playford City (R)	22	4	4	14	29	66	−37	16	Relegation to SASF State League

(C) Champions; (R) Relegated

=== Finals ===
Elimination and Qualifying Finals
2	Adelaide Raiders	1
3	Adelaide Blue Eagles	2
4	Adelaide Galaxy	1
5	White City	0

Semifinals
1	North Eastern MetroStars	3
3	Adelaide Blue Eagles	2
2	Adelaide Raiders	2
4	Adelaide Galaxy	3

Preliminary Final
3	Adelaide Blue Eagles	4
4	Adelaide Galaxy	3

Grand Final
1	North Eastern MetroStars	1
3	Adelaide Blue Eagles	2

== 2003 SASF State League ==
South Australian State League
- Season: 2003
- Champions: Grand Final; Campbelltown City; Minor Premiership; Campbelltown City
- Promoted: Campbelltown City; Cumberland United
- Matches: 132
- Biggest home win: Campbelltown City 10–0 Seaford Rangers (10 May 2003)
- Biggest away win: 5 goals (5 times)
- Highest scoring: Adelaide Hills 10–1 Port Pirie City (9 August 2003) (11 goals)

The 2003 South Australian State League was the third last season of the SASF State League, as the second highest domestic level association football competition in South Australia. It was contested by 12 teams in a single 22 round league format, each team playing all of their opponents twice.

Pos	Team	Pld	W	D	L	GF	GA	GD	Pts	Promotion or qualification
1	Campbelltown City (C, P)	22	17	3	2	74	16	+58	54	Promotion to SASF Premier League
2	Cumberland United (P)	22	17	3	2	53	15	+38	54	Qualification for Finals
3	Port Adelaide Pirates	22	14	3	5	62	34	+28	45	Qualification for Finals
4	Noarlunga United	22	12	4	6	39	23	+16	40	Qualification for Finals
5	South Adelaide	22	11	5	6	48	36	+12	38	Qualification for Finals
6	Northern Demons	22	11	3	8	52	44	+8	36	
7	Adelaide Cobras	22	8	2	12	40	45	−5	26	
8	Adelaide Hills Hawks	22	6	5	11	41	40	+1	23	
9	Salisbury United	22	5	3	14	25	58	−33	18	
10	Western Strikers	22	4	5	13	28	44	−16	17	
11	Seaford Rangers	22	3	6	13	21	72	−51	15	
12	Port Pirie City	22	1	4	17	31	87	−56	7	

(C) Champions; (P) Promoted

=== Finals ===
Elimination and Qualifying Finals
2	Cumberland United	1
3	Port Adelaide Pirates	0
4	Noarlunga United	0
5	South Adelaide	1

Semifinals
1	Campbelltown City	0 (1)
2	Cumberland United	0 (3)
3	Port Adelaide Pirates	2
5	South Adelaide	1

Preliminary Final
1	Campbelltown City	2
3	Port Adelaide Pirates	1

Grand Final
1	Campbelltown City	2
2	Cumberland United	1

== See also ==
- 2003 SASF Premier League
- 2003 SASF State League
- National Premier Leagues South Australia
- Football Federation South Australia
