= North Eastern MetroStars SC =

Australian semi-professional soccer club

NorthEastern MetroStars
- Full name: North Eastern MetroStars Soccer Club
- Nickname: Metro
- Founded: 1994; 32 years ago
- Ground: T.K. Shutter Reserve
- Capacity: 2,000
- Chairman: Rob Rende
- Manager: Adam van Dommele
- League: NPL South Australia
- 2026: 3rd of 12
- Website: http://www.metrostars.com.au/
Home colours	Away colours

North Eastern MetroStars Soccer Club, commonly known as Metrostars, is an Australian semi-professional soccer club based in Adelaide, South Australia. Founded in 1994, the club currently competes in the National Premier Leagues South Australia with home matches played at the T.K. Shutter Reserve in the north-eastern suburb of Klemzig.

== History ==
The club was initially known as the Metro Knights before a name change in 1999 to avoid a naming conflict with the Para Hills Knights. A verbal agreement with the New York/New Jersey MetroStars of Major League Soccer was reached to rename the team to the North Eastern MetroStars. Committee members that founded the club were Peter Pipicella, Andrew Perrone, Tony Taormina, Ady DiBartolo, Frank Calipari and Rob Rende and the requirement was that the passion for good value soccer and love of the game would always be the driving force behind the club.

It started playing in Division 2 of the Saturday Amateur league in 1995, won promotion into Division 1, and quickly became the dominant side in the league.

The club entered the SASF State League in 1999 and won promotion to the Premier League in its first season.

MetroStars has subsequently cemented its position in the top South Australian football league and has developed into one of the league's leading clubs. During the formation of the FFSA and the Super League, MetroStars supported the federation, and in early 2006 was the first club to become a member.

They have won the super league in both senior and reserve squads They have also produced young players such as Jason Spagnuolo, Fabian Barbiero and Francesco Monterosso, all who have been recruited by Adelaide United. Adriano Pellegrino and Shane Smeltz have gone onto other A-League clubs' books.

On 25 August 2012 they won the Federation Cup final against Para Hills Knights for the third time.

In September 2012, the club won its third League championship. MetroStars won back to back National Premier Leagues South Australia Minor Premierships in 2013 and 2014.

In October 2014, MetroStars defeated New South Wales outfit Bonnyrigg White Eagles 1–0 to claim the NPL National Championship.

In June 2016, MetroStars defeated Adelaide Comets 1–0 at Hindmarsh Stadium to win the FFSA Federation Cup and qualify for the FFA Cup.

In June 2017, MetroStars defeated Adelaide City 2–0 at Hindmarsh Stadium to win the FFSA Federation Cup and qualify for the FFA Cup Round of 32 for the third year running.

In July 2025, MetroStars won the NPL South Australia championship for the third consecutive year and subsequently qualified for the inaugural edition of the Australian Championship.

== Current squad ==
As of 8 April 2026

Note: Flags indicate national team as defined under FIFA eligibility rules; some limited exceptions apply. Players may hold more than one non-FIFA nationality.

No.	Pos.	Nation	Player
1	GK	AUS	Cody Oestreich
50	GK	AUS	Vincent Barbaro
2	MF	CZE	Samuel Vizy
3	DF	AUS	Noah Blazeka
4	DF	AUS	Noah McNamara
6	DF	AUS	Jackson Fortunatow
7	MF	AUS	Hamish Gow (vc)
9	FW	AUS	Andre Carle
10	FW	AUS	Jesse Francesca
12	FW	JPN	Rentaro Miyakawa
14	MF	AUS	Binyam Kebede
17	MF	AUS	Thomas Visser

No.	Pos.	Nation	Player
20	DF	AUS	Lionnel Muhitira
22	MF	AUS	Jackson Walls (c)
23	DF	AUS	Scott Nagel
24	MF	AUS	Anthony Rapuano
25	MF	AUS	Michael Cittadini
8	MF	AUS	Christian Sotira
77	FW	AUS	Don Niyonkuru
19	MF	AUS	Yel Akot
15	MF	AUS	Nicholas Pedicini
16	FW	AUS	Joseph Terminello
11	MF	USA	Cameron Woodfin

== Non-playing staff ==
Position	Name
Head coach	Adam van Dommele
Assistant coach	Adam Holmes
Assistant coach	Matt Prodanovski
Goalkeeping coach	Anthony Breadon

Ref:

== Notable former players ==
* List of professional footballers who have played for the club.

- (Australia) Adam van Dommele
- (Australia) Adriano Pellegrino
- (Australia) Ariath Piol
- (Lebanon) Austin Ayoubi
- (Australia) Christian Esposito
- (Australia) Fabian Barbiero
- (Australia) Francesco Monterosso
- (Australia) Jason Spagnuolo
- (Australia) Lachlan Barr
- (Australia) Liam Wooding
- (Australia) Louis Brain
- (Australia) Michael Matricciani
- (Australia) Scott Tunbridge
- (Australia) Travis Dodd
- (New Zealand) Shane Smeltz
- (Australia) James Troisi

== Club honours ==
=== National ===
- National Premier Leagues

Winners (1): 2014

=== State ===
- South Australian First Division Championship

Winners (3): 2004, 2009, 2012
Runner-up (3): 2003, 2008, 2014

- South Australian First Division Premiership

Winners (12): 2003, 2004, 2005, 2009, 2010, 2011, 2013, 2014, 2017, 2023, 2024, 2025
Runner-up (2): 2008, 2018

- South Australian Second Division Championship

Runner-up (1): 1999

- Federation Cup

Winners (7): 2004, 2008, 2012, 2016, 2017, 2023, 2025
Runner-up (4): 2000, 2003, 2007, 2010

- Summer Night Series

Winners (4): 2003, 2005, 2008, 2011
Runner-up (2): 2009, 2010

Ref:
