= T.K. Shutter Reserve =

Coordinates: 34.875203°S 138.643102°E

- Interactive map of T.K. Shutter Reserve
- Address: Fourth Ave, Klemzig 5087; Adelaide, South Australia; Australia
- Owner: City of Port Adelaide Enfield
- Capacity: 2,000
- Surface: Artificial turf
- Record attendance: 2,073 (North Eastern MetroStars vs Macarthur FC, 2025 Australia Cup)

Tenants
- North Eastern MetroStars (WNPLSA); North Eastern MetroStars (NPLSA)

Thomas Keith Shutter Reserve, commonly known as T.K. Shutter Reserve, is a soccer facility in Klemzig, a north-eastern suburb of Adelaide, South Australia.

The main pitch contains artificial turf and the two additional pitches have natural grass. The facility is named after Thomas Keith Shutter, the mayor of the City of Enfield from 1931–1938 and 1947–1955. North Eastern MetroStars have played at the ground since their formation in 1994.

In 2024, the facility was upgraded to include a new grandstand to seat 250 spectators, and a redevelopment of the change rooms.
