= Michael Esposito =

Michael Esposito may refer to:

- Michael P. Esposito, member of the New Jersey General Assembly

== See also ==
- Mike Esposito (disambiguation)
