= Antonio Esposito (footballer, born 1983) =

Italian footballer

Personal information
- Date of birth: 9 September 1983 (age 43)
- Place of birth: Naples, Italy
- Height: 1.80 m (5 ft 11 in)
- Position: Midfielder

Team information
- Current team: Sorrento

Senior career*
Years	Team	Apps	(Gls)
2001–2002	Arbus	6	(0)
2002–2007	Juve Stabia	110	(15)
2007–2009	Foggia	19	(1)
2008–2009	→ Paganese (loan)	30	(2)
2009–	Sorrento	26	(1)
- * Club domestic league appearances and goals as of the end of the 2009-10 season

Antonio Esposito (born 9 September 1983) is an Italian footballer who plays for Sorrento. He spent his entire career in the Italian Lega Pro and Serie D division (3 to 5 highest level of the pyramid)

== Biography ==
Esposito started his career at Serie D team Arbus, located in the Sardinia island. He then returned to the Province of Naples and played for Comprensorio Stabia (Juve Stabia). He followed the latter to promote from Serie D to Serie C2 and from Serie C2 to Serie C1 in 2005.

In 2007, he signed a 3-year contract with Foggia. He left for Paganese in the next season. In July 2009, he was signed by Sorrento in co-ownership deal.
