= Antonio Esposito (footballer, born 2000) =

Italian footballer

Personal information
- Date of birth: 4 May 2000 (age 26)
- Place of birth: Naples, Italy
- Height: 1.84 m (6 ft 0 in)
- Position: Left back

Team information
- Current team: Puteolana

Youth career
- Frosinone

Senior career*
Years	Team	Apps	(Gls)
2019–2020	Frosinone	0	(0)
2019–2020	→ Monterosi (loan)	26	(2)
2020–2023	Renate	30	(0)
2022–2023	→ Latina (loan)	13	(0)
2024–	Puteolana	0	(0)
- * Club domestic league appearances and goals as of 16 December 2023

Antonio Esposito (born 4 May 2000) is an Italian professional footballer who plays as a left back for Serie D club Puteolana.

== Club career ==
Formed in Frosinone youth system, Esposito made his senior debut for Serie D club Monterosi, in the 2019–20 season on loan.

In 2020 Esposito joined Renate.

On 15 July 2022, Esposito moved to Latina on loan.
