= Salvatore Esposito =

Salvatore Esposito may refer to:

- Salvatore Esposito (actor) (born 1986), Italian actor
- Salvatore Esposito (footballer, born 1948), Italian footballer
- Salvatore Esposito (footballer, born 2000), Italian footballer
