= Joe Esposito =

Joe Esposito may refer to:

- Joe Esposito (author) (1938–2016), American author and publisher
- Joe Esposito (basketball) (born 1966), University of Minnesota basketball coach
- Joe Esposito (politician) (1872–1928), American corrupt politician
- Joe Esposito (singer) (born 1948), member of the Brooklyn Dreams
- Joseph Esposito (born 1950), American retired law enforcement officer
