= Adam van Dommele =

Australian soccer player

Personal information
- Full name: Adam Robert van Dommele
- Date of birth: 5 September 1984 (age 42)
- Place of birth: Elizabeth, South Australia, Australia
- Height: 1.82 m (5 ft 11 1/2 in)
- Position: Left back

Youth career
- 2000: SASI

Senior career*
| Years | Team | Apps | (Gls) |
| 2002 | Modbury Jets | 16 | (1) |
| 2003 | Hartlepool United | 0 | (0) |
| 2003–2005 | Enfield City | 39 | (0) |
| 2005–2007 | Adelaide United | 24 | (0) |
| 2007–2008 | South Melbourne | 34 | (0) |
| 2009–2017 | MetroStars | 196 | (19) |
| 2017–2020 | Adelaide Raiders | 64 | (1) |

International career^{‡}
| 2001 | Australia U17 | 6 | (0) |

Managerial career
- 2023–2026: MetroStars (assistant)
- 2026–: MetroStars
- * Club domestic league appearances and goals as of 9 November 2020 ‡ National team caps and goals as of 15 May 2011

Adam van Dommele (born 5 September 1984) is an Australian former soccer player who last played for MetroStars.

== Club career ==
In 2005 after returning from England he signed with A-League club Adelaide United however was released after his second season. Since then he has played for South Melbourne FC and most recently MetroStars, who serves currently as Captain.

== International career ==
He has represented Australia at Under 17 level, including during the 2001 FIFA U-17 World Championship held in Trinidad and Tobago where he played in every game.

== Managerial career ==
| Years | Team | Notes |
|---|---|---|
| 2023–2026 | MetroStars (Assistant Coach) | |
| 2026– | MetroStars | Head coach |
