= Christian Esposito =

Australian soccer player (born 1990)

Personal information
- Full name: Christian Esposito
- Date of birth: 23 July 1990 (age 36)
- Place of birth: Adelaide, Australia
- Height: 1.81 m (5 ft 11 1/2 in)
- Position: Striker

Youth career
- –2010: AlbinoLeffe
- 2010–2014: Novara

Senior career*
Years	Team	Apps	(Gls)
2009–2010	AlbinoLeffe	1	(0)
2010–2014	Novara	0	(0)
2010–2011	→ Pro Vercelli (loan)	1	(0)
2011–2012	→ Catanzaro (loan)	38	(5)
2012–2013	→ Saint-Christophe (loan)	17	(2)
2013–2014	→ Savona (loan)	6	(1)
2015–2023	MetroStars	146	(78)
2023	Croydon FC	3	(1)
- * Club domestic league appearances and goals as of 21 August 2023

Christian Esposito (born 23 July 1990) is an Australian soccer player who currently plays with North Eastern MetroStars SC.

== Club career ==
On 9 May 2009, he made his senior debut for AlbinoLeffe against Frosinone in the 2008–09 Serie B season.

In July 2009, Esposito was linked to a move to his hometown club Adelaide United. However, despite some initial interest he later denied he wanted to return to Australia.

In June 2010, he joined Prima Divisione Champion Novara on a free transfer, which binds him with the Serie A club until June 2014. He has since been loaned out to F.C. Pro Vercelli 1892 and Catanzaro.
