= Pablo Despósito =

Argentine footballer

Personal information
- Full name: Pablo Ignacio Despósito
- Date of birth: 30 January 1989 (age 37)
- Place of birth: Buenos Aires, Argentina
- Height: 1.78 m (5 ft 10 in)
- Position: Midfielder

Team information
- Current team: Ferrocarril Midland
- Number: 5

Senior career*
Years	Team	Apps	(Gls)
2008–2010	Vélez Sarsfield		
2010–2011	Tristán Suárez		
2011	Independiente Medellín	6	(0)
2012	Independiente (Campo Grande)		
2012–2013	Tristán Suárez	14	(0)
2013–2014	Atlético Tucumán	6	(0)
2014–2015	Almirante Brown	24	(2)
2016–2017	Concepción	25	(0)
2017	Libertad	10	(0)
2022–2023	Ituzaingó	39	(0)
2023	Defensores Unidos	6	(1)
2024–	Ferrocarril Midland	25	(0)
- * Club domestic league appearances and goals as of 21 September 2024

Pablo Ignacio Despósito (born 30 January 1989) is an Argentine footballer who plays for Ferrocarril Midland.

== Teams ==
- (Argentina) Vélez Sársfield 2008–2010
- (Argentina) Tristán Suárez 2010–2011
- (Colombia) Independiente Medellín 2011
- (Paraguay) Independiente (Campo Grande) 2012
- (Argentina) Tristán Suárez 2012–2013
- (Argentina) Atlético Tucumán 2013–present
