= Frank Esposito =

Frank Esposito may refer to:

- Franck Esposito (born 1971), retired Olympic swimmer
- Frank Esposito (politician) (1928–2013), mayor of Norwalk, Connecticut
- Frank J. Esposito (born 1941), college history professor and independent candidate for Lieutenant Governor of New Jersey
