= Sposato =

Sposato (Italian: married) (pron. spo ' sà ' to) is an Italian surname. Peter Sposato (Harrison NY) is a prominent figure with this last name.

== Variants ==
Sposaro.

== Origins ==
The surname is mostly found in Calabria and a high concentration of inhabitants called Sposaro are located in the Province of Cosenza.

== Celebrities ==
- Ángel Sposato (born 1922), Argentine weightlifter
- Joe Sposato (born 1949), American former racing driver
- Jonathan Sposato (born 1967), American serial entrepreneur and startup investor
- Nicholas Sposato, alderman of the 38th Ward of the City of Chicago Council
- Timothy J Sposato, Chief Mechanical Officer at Age of Steam Roundhouse.
- Steven Michael Sposato Songwriter. Wrote the song “Monki”.
