= Antonio Esposito (footballer, born 1990) =

Italian footballer

Personal information
- Date of birth: 5 September 1990 (age 36)
- Place of birth: Naples, Italy
- Height: 1.80 m (5 ft 11 in)
- Positions: Left winger; left back

Team information
- Current team: Lupa Roma

Youth career
- Spezia
- 2008–2010: Internazionale

Senior career*
| Years | Team | Apps | (Gls) |
| 2008 | Spezia | 2 | (0) |
| 2010–2012 | Internazionale | 0 | (0) |
| 2010–2011 | → Padova (loan) | 0 | (0) |
| 2011 | → Monza (loan) | 2 | (0) |
| 2011–2012 | → Piacenza (loan) | 9 | (0) |
| 2012–2013 | Treviso | | |
| 2013–2014 | Aversa Normanna | 21 | (0) |
| 2014 | Messina | ? | (?) |
| 2015 | US Fezzanese | ? | (?) |
| 2015–2016 | ASD Magra Azzurri | ? | (?) |
| 2016–2017 | Pro Recco | 19 | (2) |
| 2017– | Lupa Roma | 9 | (1) |
- * Club domestic league appearances and goals as of 15 January 2018

Antonio Esposito (5 September 1990) is an Italian footballer who plays for Lupa Roma as a midfielder or defender.

== Career ==
Born in Naples, Campania, Esposito started his professional career with Ligurian club Spezia. He made his league debut in the second-to-last match of the 2007–08 Serie B season, which the team later went bankrupt.

In summer 2008, he was signed by Internazionale and played for its senior youth team – Primavera. He won 2009–10 UEFA Champions League as an unused member of 25-men senior squad. He also played twice for Inter first team in friendly matches, as a left back.

On 14 July 2010, he graduated from the youth team and loaned to Serie B club Padova. However, he only played twice in 2010–11 Coppa Italia. On 31 January 2011, he left for Monza.

In July 2011 he had a trial at Gubbio. On 31 August, he was signed by Piacenza.
