= Floriana Esposito =

Italian computer scientist

- Born: 1947 (age 78–79)
- Awards: EurAI Fellow; 2006

Academic background
- Education: University of Bari (Laurea)

Academic work
- Discipline: Computer scientist
- Sub-discipline: Artificial intelligence; Machine learning
- Institutions: University of Bari

Floriana Esposito (born 1947) is an Italian computer scientist whose research topics in artificial intelligence and machine learning have included decision tree learning, description logic, and document layout analysis. She is a professor of computer science and the former dean of computer science at the University of Bari, where she heads the Laboratory for Knowledge Acquisition and Machine Learning.

== Education and career ==
Esposito studied electronic physics at the University of Bari, earning a laurea (the Italian equivalent of a master's degree) in 1970. She became an assistant professor at the university in 1974, an associate professor in 1984, and a full professor in 1994. She served as dean of the university's Faculty of Computer Science from 1997 to 2002, and head of the Department of Computer Science from 2003 to 2008.

She founded the Laboratory for Knowledge Acquisition and Machine Learning (LACAM) in 1989, and continues to serve as its scientific director.

== Recognition ==
Esposito is a Fellow of the European Association for Artificial Intelligence, elected as a fellow in 2006.
