= Mike Esposito =

Mike Esposito may refer to:

- Mike Esposito (American football) (born 1953), running back for the Atlanta Falcons
- Mike Esposito (baseball) (born 1981), pitcher for the Colorado Rockies
- Mike Esposito (comics) (1927–2010), comic book artist, writer and publisher
- Mike Esposito, lead guitarist for the rock music group Blues Magoos

== See also ==
- Michael Esposito (disambiguation)
