= 2004 SASF season =

South Australian Soccer Federation
- Season: 2004
- Champions: North Eastern MetroStars

The 2004 South Australian Soccer Federation season was the 98th season of soccer in South Australia.

== 2004 SASF Premier League ==
South Australian Premier League
- Season: 2004
- Champions: Grand Final; North Eastern MetroStars; Minor Premiership; North Eastern MetroStars
- Relegated: Croydon Kings; Adelaide Galaxy
- Matches: 132
- Biggest home win: Enfield City 6–0 Campbelltown City (16 April 2004); Adelaide Raiders 6–0 Modbury Jets (25 September 2004)
- Biggest away win: Campbelltown City 0–8 White City (18 September 2004)
- Highest scoring: Enfield City 6–3 Modbury Jets (7 May 2005) (9 goals)

The 2004 South Australian Premier League was the penultimate season of the SASF Premier League, the top-level domestic association football competition in South Australia. It was contested by 12 teams in a single 22-round league format, each team playing each of their opponents twice.

Pos	Team	Pld	W	D	L	GF	GA	GD	Pts	Qualification or relegation
1	North Eastern MetroStars (C)	22	16	4	2	44	22	+22	52	Qualification for Finals
2	Adelaide Olympic	22	14	5	3	47	21	+26	47	Qualification for Finals
3	Adelaide Raiders	22	13	2	7	52	27	+25	41	Qualification for Finals
4	White City	22	10	6	6	46	32	+14	36	Qualification for Finals
5	Adelaide Blue Eagles	22	10	6	6	36	28	+8	36	Qualification for Finals
6	Cumberland United	22	9	5	8	28	32	−4	32	
7	Adelaide City	22	7	6	9	27	41	−14	27	
8	Campbelltown City	22	7	5	10	29	45	−16	26	
9	Enfield City	22	6	6	10	32	36	−4	24	
10	Modbury Jets	22	5	6	11	24	40	−16	21	
11	Croydon Kings (R)	22	3	5	14	24	38	−14	14	Relegation to SASF State League
12	Adelaide Galaxy (R)	22	2	4	16	15	42	−27	10	Relegation to SASF State League

(C) Champions; (R) Relegated

=== Finals ===
Elimination and Qualifying Finals
2	Adelaide Olympic	0
3	Adelaide Raiders	2
4	White City	5
5	Adelaide Blue Eagles	0

Semifinals
1	North Eastern MetroStars	4
3	Adelaide Raiders	1
2	Adelaide Olympic	2
4	White City	1

Preliminary Final
2	Adelaide Olympic	3
3	Adelaide Raiders	2

Grand Final
2	North Eastern MetroStars	2
3	Adelaide Olympic	1

== 2004 SASF State League ==
South Australian State League
- Season: 2004
- Champions: Grand Final; Playford City Patriots; Minor Premiership; Playford City Patriots
- Promoted: Playford City Patriots; Adelaide Hills
- Matches: 132
- Biggest home win: Western Strikers 10–1 Seaford Rangers (10 July 2004)
- Biggest away win: South Adelaide 0–8 Para Hills Knights (18 September 2004)
- Highest scoring: Western Strikers 10–1 Seaford Rangers (10 July 2004) (11 goals)

The 2004 South Australian State League was the penultimate season of the SASF State League, as the second-highest domestic level association football competition in South Australia. It was contested by 12 teams in a single 22-round league format, each team playing each of their opponents twice.

Pos	Team	Pld	W	D	L	GF	GA	GD	Pts	Promotion or qualification
1	Playford City (C, P)	22	16	1	5	58	24	+34	49	Promotion to SASF Premier League
2	Para Hills Knights	22	16	0	6	59	26	+33	48	Qualification for Finals
3	Adelaide Cobras	22	14	4	4	43	22	+21	46	Qualification for Finals
4	Noarlunga United	22	13	2	7	52	39	+13	41	Qualification for Finals
5	Adelaide Hills Hawks (P)	22	11	5	6	40	28	+12	38	Qualification for Finals
6	Northern Demons	22	10	4	8	58	36	+22	34	
7	Western Strikers	22	8	6	8	48	41	+7	30	
8	Port Adelaide Pirates	22	7	6	9	44	38	+6	27	
9	South Adelaide	22	7	3	12	35	55	−20	24	
10	Salisbury United	22	3	8	11	37	60	−23	17	
11	Port Pirie City	22	3	5	14	28	71	−43	14	
12	Seaford Rangers	22	1	2	19	19	81	−62	5	

(C) Champions; (P) Promoted

=== Finals ===
Elimination and Qualifying Finals
2	Para Hills Knights	2
3	Adelaide Cobras	1
4	Noarlunga United	1
5	Adelaide Hills	2

Semifinals
1	Playford City Patriots	6
2	Para Hills Knights	2
3	Adelaide Cobras	1
5	Adelaide Hills	2

Preliminary Final
2	Para Hills Knights	2
5	Adelaide Hills	3

Grand Final
1	Playford City Patriots	5
5	Adelaide Hills	1

== See also ==
- 2004 SASF Premier League
- 2004 SASF State League
- Football Federation South Australia
- National Premier Leagues South Australia
