= 2005 SASF season =

South Australian Soccer Federation
- Season: 2005
- Champions: Adelaide City

The 2005 South Australian Soccer Federation season was the 99th season of soccer in South Australia, and the final under the SASF format.

== 2005 SASF Premier League ==
South Australian Premier League
- Season: 2005
- Champions: Grand Final; Adelaide City; Minor Premiership; North Eastern MetroStars
- Relegated: Playford City Patriots; Enfield City; Adelaide Hills
- Matches: 132
- Biggest home win: MetroStars 11–1 Adelaide Hills (18 June 2005)
- Biggest away win: Adelaide Hills 0–8 MetroStars (2 April 2005); Modbury Jets 0–8 White City (29 July 2005)
- Highest scoring: MetroStars 11–1 Adelaide Hills (18 June 2005) (12 goals)

The 2005 South Australian Premier League was the final season of the SASF Premier League, the top level domestic association football competition in South Australia. It was contested by 12 teams in a single 22 round league format, each team playing all of their opponents twice.

Pos	Team	Pld	W	D	L	GF	GA	GD	Pts	Qualification or relegation
1	North Eastern MetroStars	22	16	6	0	61	11	+50	54	Qualification for Finals
2	Adelaide City (C)	22	15	2	5	43	26	+17	47	Qualification for Finals
3	Adelaide Raiders	22	14	2	6	44	28	+16	44	Qualification for Finals
4	Adelaide Olympic	22	12	3	7	36	22	+14	39	Qualification for Finals
5	Adelaide Blue Eagles	22	10	9	3	33	21	+12	39	Qualification for Finals
6	White City	22	9	4	9	44	32	+12	31	
7	Cumberland United	22	9	4	9	42	33	+9	31	
8	Campbelltown City	22	7	8	7	33	32	+1	29	
9	Modbury Jets	22	6	4	12	29	55	−26	22	
10	Playford City (R)	22	4	4	14	24	48	−24	16	Relegation to FFSA Premier League
11	Enfield City (R)	22	4	2	16	21	41	−20	14	Relegation to FFSA Premier League
12	Adelaide Hills Hawks (R)	22	1	2	19	16	77	−61	5	Relegation to FFSA Premier League

(C) Champions; (R) Relegated

=== Finals ===
Elimination and Qualifying Finals
2	Adelaide City	0
3	Adelaide Raiders	1
4	Adelaide Olympic	3
5	Adelaide Blue Eagles	2

Semifinals
1	North Eastern MetroStars	0
3	Adelaide Raiders	2
2	Adelaide City	1
4	Adelaide Olympic	0

Preliminary Final
1	North Eastern MetroStars	0
2	Adelaide City	2

Grand Final
2	Adelaide City	2
3	Adelaide Raiders	1

== 2005 SASF State League ==
South Australian State League
- Season: 2005
- Champions: Grand Final; Adelaide Galaxy; Minor Premiership; Adelaide Galaxy
- Promoted: Adelaide Galaxy
- Relegated: Salisbury United; Western Strikers; Adelaide Cobras; Seaford Rangers
- Matches: 132
- Biggest home win: Para Hills Knights 9–1 Seaford Rangers (23 April 2005)
- Biggest away win: Seaford Rangers 0–9 Northern Demons (30 April 2005)
- Highest scoring: Para Hills Knights 9–1 Seaford Rangers (23 April 2005); Seaford Rangers 1–9 Port Pirie City (7 May 2005) (10 goals)

The 2005 South Australian State League was the final season of the SASF State League, as the second highest domestic level association football competition in South Australia. It was contested by 12 teams in a single 22 round league format, each team playing all of their opponents twice.

Pos	Team	Pld	W	D	L	GF	GA	GD	Pts	Promotion, qualification or relegation
1	Adelaide Galaxy (C, P)	22	15	2	5	55	17	+38	47	Promotion to FFSA Super League
2	Port Adelaide Pirates	22	13	3	6	65	42	+23	42	Qualification for Finals
3	South Adelaide	22	12	4	6	42	29	+13	40	Qualification for Finals
4	Para Hills Knights	22	11	4	7	64	39	+25	37	Qualification for Finals
5	Noarlunga United	22	10	7	5	38	25	+13	37	Qualification for Finals
6	Northern Demons	22	10	5	7	44	26	+18	35	
7	Croydon Kings	22	9	6	7	29	25	+4	33	
8	Port Pirie City (R)	22	10	1	11	42	49	−7	31	Relegation to FFSA State League
9	Salisbury United	22	8	4	10	37	31	+6	28	
10	Western Strikers (R)	22	7	6	9	41	35	+6	27	Relegation to FFSA State League
11	Adelaide Cobras (R)	22	3	5	14	27	62	−35	14	Relegation to FFSA State League
12	Seaford Rangers (R)	22	0	1	21	7	111	−104	1	Relegation to FFSA State League

(C) Champions; (P) Promoted; (R) Relegated

=== Finals ===
Elimination and Qualifying Finals
2	Port Adelaide Pirates	4
3	South Adelaide	2
4	Para Hills Knights	0
5	Noarlunga United	1

Semifinals
1	Adelaide Galaxy	3
2	Port Adelaide Pirates	2
3	South Adelaide	2
5	Noarlunga United	1

Preliminary Final
2	Port Adelaide Pirates	5
3	South Adelaide	1

Grand Final
1	Adelaide Galaxy	7
2	Port Adelaide Pirates	1

== See also ==
- 2005 SASF Premier League
- 2005 SASF State League
- National Premier Leagues South Australia
- Football Federation South Australia
