= Daniel Barret (sociologist) =

Uruguayan anarchist, sociologist, and journalist

Rafael Spósito Balzarini
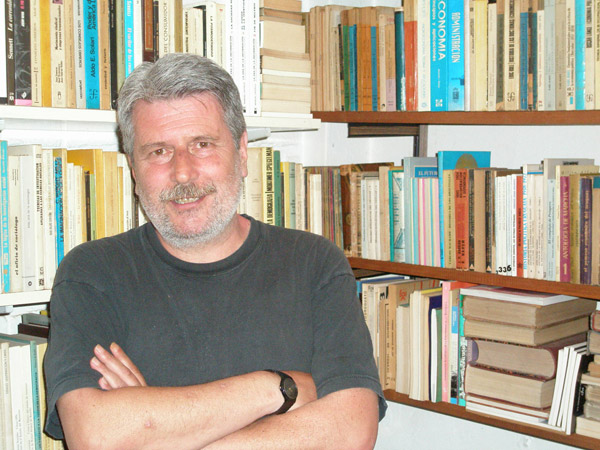
- Born: 21 May 1952; Montevideo, Uruguay
- Died: 24 August 2009 (aged 57); Montevideo, Uruguay
- Occupations: Sociologist, journalist, anarchist

Rafael Spósito Balzarini (21 May 1952 – 24 August 2009), better known by the pseudonym Daniel Barret, was a Uruguayan sociologist, journalist, university professor, and militant anarchist.

== Written work ==
Barret's work has been studied for the insight it provides into the renewal and development of anarchist theory in the Latin American context. According to Battistessa, Barret's work mapped out the "new awakening of the libertarian struggle in Latin America" during an "historic moment of strong tensions and anxieties". Takis Fotopoulos commented that Barret provided a "bright analysis of the rationale for a new liberatory project" in Latin America, in the context of Latin America being "at the very front of the neoliberal attack" following "the collapse of statist socialism in its Soviet and social democratic forms".

In particular, Barret's Los sediciosos despertares de la anarquía (2011) has become a focal text for scholars interested in the development of Latin American anarchist thought in the later half of the twentieth century. Acácio Augusto commented that Barret raises "questions that should not be ignored" in asking "whether anarchists must choose between the security of structure or the risk of imagination". According to Nelson Enrique Méndez Pacheco, Los sediciosos despertares de la anarquía provided "the most thorough examination that has been made of the realities and tasks that the Latin American anarchist movement must face today".

Steven Best wrote that Barret's work, Towards a New Vision for Global Society, drew "from recent trends in contemporary social theory (particularly the postmodern break from foundationalism) to redefine categories such as human nature, freedom, and democracy and free them from ideologies of domination", and recontextualising these "normative claims" as "no longer tied to timeless "truths,"" but instead being "thoroughly historical and embodied in social relations".

== Biography ==
Barret was born and lived in Villa del Cerro, a working-class Montevideo neighbourhood. He became involved with anarchism as a youth. He was involved as an organiser in the student movement, and later the labour union movement. He joined, and later left, the Federación Anarquista Uruguaya (Uruguayan Anarchist Federation).

Because of the repression of anarchist and leftist movements in Uruguay during the 1970s, Barret moved to Buenos Aires, Argentina - although following the 1976 coup d'état, he returned to Uruguay. With the end of the Uruguayan dictatorship, Barret took part in the relaunch of the Federación Anarquista Uruguaya, however, he again removed himself from the movement as a result of significant ideological differences. Following this, Barret became involved independently in various libertarian projects and committed his energy to libertarian journalism and sociology.

Until 1999, Barret was a university professor in Montevideo. He was a member of the International Advisory Board for the International Journal of Inclusive Democracy. He contributed to a variety of anarchist publications including ¡Libertad! (Buenos Aires), El Libertario, and Tierra y Tempestad.

Barret died of cancer in Montevideo on 24 August 2009.

== Selected articles ==
- Cuba, el Socialismo y la Libertad, una visión desde el anarquismo. Ediciones Libertarias México 2006.
- De Fidel a Raúl: La Cuba de los politicastros.
- Sobre la situación boliviana: Anarquistas, a pesar de todo.*Al pan, pan y al vino, vino: a propósito del reciente “Manifiesto solidario” de la Internacional de Federaciones Anarquistas
- Cuba y la revolución latinoamericana*Anarquismo, Anti-Imperialismo, Cuba y Venezuela: Un diálogo fraternal (pero sin concesiones) con Pablo Moras
- La "Leyenda Negra" de los anarquistas cubanos: un ataque más y van...
- El mapa del despertar anarquista latinoamericano
- Los Sediciosos Despertares de la Anarquía
- El movimiento anarquista uruguayo en los tiempos del cólera (publicado en "Tierra y Tempestad" N.º2 de mayo de 2008.)
- "The irresistible (and necessary) temptation of the liberating projects," Democracy & Nature, Vol. 8, n.º 3 (November 2003)
