= Adelaide Comets FC =

Football club in South Australia

Adelaide Comets
- Full name: Adelaide Comets Football Club
- Nickname: Comets
- Founded: 1994; 32 years ago
- Ground: LJ Hooker Mile End Sports Park
- Capacity: 2,000
- President: Jim Tsouvalas
- Head coach: Dimitri Panagis
- League: NPL South Australia
- 2026: 11th of 12, (relegated)
- Website: adelaidecomets.com.au
Home colours	Away colours

Adelaide Comets FC are a soccer club based in Adelaide, South Australia. The club competes in the National Premier Leagues South Australia. They are based in Adelaide's western suburb of Mile End and play home games at LJ Hooker Mile End Sports Park.

== History ==
Adelaide Comets Football Club was formed in 1994 and were known as Adelaide Raiders Soccer Club who competed in the SAASL (South Australian Amateur Soccer League). To avoid confusion with another local soccer club which plays under the name of "Raiders", the playing name was changed to Adelaide Comets in 2001 when the club first fielded junior teams.

As Adelaide Raiders, the club won the South Australia Amateur Soccer League SAASL Saturday Division 2 Championship in its inaugural year and gained promotion to the SAASL Saturday Division 1 competition. In 1997, they established themselves as the states premier Amateur League side becoming Champions in Saturday's Division 1 Competition. In 2001, the club registered 5 teams in the South Australian Soccer Federation's (SASF) Junior Premier League.

Achieving this goal was the catalyst for the club changing its name to Adelaide Comets, to avoid confusion with Adelaide Raiders (Formerly Adelaide Croatia Raiders). During this time, the club's senior team continued to enjoy success in the SAASL winning consecutive Championships in 2001, 2002 and 2003. This ongoing success at the highest level of amateur competition generated the push for a move to a higher league for the Adelaide Comets. The club made several attempts over a number of years to find a place for itself within the SASF competition with no success.

Finally, with the implementation of a new governing body for the sport in South Australia, Adelaide Comets entered the newly formed State League in 2006 under the banner of the Football Federation South Australia (FFSA).

The club is now one of the largest junior based clubs in South Australia with 370 junior players, along with three SAASL Amateur men's teams, FFSA Open Age Women's and a senior squad who after gaining promotion through the FFSA State and Premier League competitions now competes in the states top division of football, The FFSA Super League, thus totaling nearly 500 registered players across the club.

Comets advanced to the final of the 2018 FFSA Federation Cup by defeating Cumberland United 3–2 in the Semi Final. They defeated Croydon Kings in the 2018 FFSA Federation Cup final awarding them a spot in the Round of 32 of the 2018 FFA Cup. On 25 July 2018 they defeated Football West State League 1 side Gwelup Croatia advancing to the round of 16 of the 2018 FFA Cup.

== Promotion ==
In 2005 the club had been introduced into the newly formed FFSA State League moving on from the SAASL into the FFSA. Year 2007 saw The Comets gain promotion to the FFSA Premier League the second tier of South Australian football, after winning the State League Title within two seasons. Remarkably in 2008 The Comets were heading for promotion to the Super League but by only winning 1 out of their last 7 games they finished the season 3rd. In just their first season in the Premier League after coming to close to making the states first division, The Comets set their sights on becoming a Super League side. The Comets had a slow start to the year in 2009 but ended up finishing 4th by winning their last 7 out of 8 games and qualified into the top 5 finals competition. They then beat Croydon Kings 2–1 in the elimination final, only to lose against Cumberland United. The following year in 2010 would see the side yet again narrowly miss promotion after a defeat to Croydon in a winner gets promoted thriller.

In 2011 The Comets was promoted into the FFSA Super League after a 2–1 victory over the Enfield City Falcons on the last day of regular season at Rushworth Reserve, winning the FFSA Premier League title.

== Players ==
=== Current squad ===
Note: Flags indicate national team as defined under FIFA eligibility rules; some limited exceptions apply. Players may hold more than one non-FIFA nationality.

No.	Pos.	Nation	Player
1	GK	AUS	Julian Torresan
2	DF	AUS	Harry Keramidas
4	DF	AUS	Tom Dittmar
5	DF	AUS	Adam Le Cornu
6	MF	AUS	Jack Bladen
8	MF	AUS	Ryan Yates
9	FW	AUS	Andreas Wiens
10	MF	AUS	Anthony Mavrolambados
11	MF	AUS	Jayden Lobasso
14	MF	IDN	Nathan Andijanto

No.	Pos.	Nation	Player
16	FW	AUS	Ninko Beric
21	DF	AUS	Rastko Ljujic
22	MF	AUS	Allan Welsh (c)
23	DF	AUS	Scott Nagel
31	GK	AUS	Daniel Vaughan

== Honours ==
=== State ===
- South Australian Division One Championship
  - Runners-up (4): 2019, 2020, 2021, 2022
- South Australian Division One Premiership
  - Winners (2): 2020, 2021
  - Runners-up (2): 2017, 2019
- South Australian Second Division Championship
  - Runners-up (1): 2011
- South Australian Second Division Premiership
  - Winners (1): 2011
- South Australian Third Division Championship
  - Winners (1): 2007
- South Australian Third Division Premiership
  - Winners (1): 2007
- Federation Cup
  - Winners (1): 2018
  - Runners-up (1): 2016
- Night Series
  - Winners (1): 2012
