= National Premier Leagues South Australia =

- Organising body: Football South Australia
- First season: 2013; 13 years ago
- Country: Australia
- State: South Australia
- Confederation: AFC
- Number of clubs: 12 (since 2016)
- Level on pyramid: 2
- Relegation to: SA State League 1
- Domestic cup(s): Australia Cup; Federation Cup
- Current champions: Adelaide City (2026)
- Current premiers: Adelaide City (2026)
- Most championships: Campbelltown City (7 titles)
- Broadcaster(s): YouTube
- Website: footballsa.com.au
- Current: 2026 NPL South Australia

The National Premier Leagues South Australia, (Note: Often shortened to NPL South Australia, National Premier Leagues SA, or just National Premier League.) officially abbreviated to NPL SA and known for sponsorship reasons as the RAA National Premier League, is a semi-professional men's soccer league in the Australian state of South Australia. The league is one of eight that comprises the National Premier Leagues, the second tier of the Australian soccer league system. The league was founded in 2012 as a successor to the Super League and is managed by Football South Australia.

Seasons start in late February, and conclude in early September with a Grand Final which, since 2022, has been held at ServiceFM Stadium. The competition was initially contested by 14 teams and was reduced to 12 teams ahead of the 2016 season.

== History ==
In 2012 it was announced that the FFSA Premier League was to become the top tier of South Australian football (below the national A-League) after the disbandment of the now defunct FFSA Super League. It was announced that the competition would consist of 14 teams. These teams would be made up of the 10 teams from the defunct Super League with the remaining 4 spots being filled by the top 4 teams from the 2012 Premier League season.

In 2013 the league joined the National Premier Leagues. From 2014 to 2019 the top-placed team after the completion of the season entered into the National Premier Leagues finals. From 2025 onwards, the top-placed team enters the Australian Championship competition.

National Premier Leagues South Australia (abbreviated as NPL SA), a subdivision of National Premier Leagues (NPL), is a semi-professional football competition in the state of South Australia. National Premier Leagues is the second-tier football competition in Australia, which sits below the Hyundai A-League and Westfield W-League on the country's football national pyramid. Football Federation Australia (FFA) embarked on a National Competition Review in October 2010, which aimed to review the football competition structure in Australia. The process of conducting the National Competition Review lasted for 20 months, and the review results were released in May 2012, in which FFA proposed to revitalise the country's state-based competitions to promote the development of elite players. As a result of this review, National Premier Leagues was established in February 2013. At the time of establishment, NPL has five subdivisions, including football teams from five corresponding state-based federations, which are Football Federation South Australia, Football Federation Tasmania, Football Queensland, Football NSW, and Capital Football. The inaugural season of NPL SA began in March 2013. Currently, this competition is run and managed by Football South Australia (formerly known as Football Federation South Australia), which is a governing body of football issues in South Australia and a competition administrator for different levels of football games in the state.

== Competition format ==
The regular season consists of a double round robin of 22 rounds, followed by a finals series for the top 6 teams. The team who finishes first is crowned Premier and qualifies for the National Premier Leagues finals series. The teams placed 11th and 12th are relegated to the State League 1 in the following season.

In the finals, the 1st and 2nd placed teams playoff in a two-legged game to qualify for the grand final, with the loser moving to a preliminary final against the winner of playoffs by the 3rd to 6th placed teams. A grand final is held at ServiceFM Stadium, where the winner is crowned Champion.

== Clubs ==
Location of teams currently competing in NPL South Australia

The following 12 clubs are competing in the 2026 season.

| Club | Home ground | Suburb |
|---|---|---|
| Adelaide City | Adelaide City Park | Oakden |
| Adelaide Comets | LJ Hooker-Mile End Sports Park | Adelaide city centre |
| Adelaide United Youth | ServiceFM Stadium | Gepps Cross |
| Campbelltown City | Steve Woodcock Sports Centre | Newton |
| Croydon FC | Regency Park | Regency Park |
| FK Beograd | 1Solution Park | Woodville West |
| North Eastern MetroStars | T.K. Shutter Reserve | Klemzig |
| Para Hills Knights | Cass and Co Stadium | Para Hills West |
| Playford City | Ramsay Park | Edinburgh North |
| Sturt Lions | Karinya Reserve | Eden Hills |
| West Adelaide | Kilburn Sportsplex | Kilburn |
| West Torrens Birkalla | Jack Smith Park | Novar Gardens |

== Honours ==
| Year | Premiers | Champions | NPL finals series representation |
|---|---|---|---|
| 2013 | North Eastern MetroStars | Campbelltown City | Campbelltown City – Semi-finals |
| 2014 | North Eastern MetroStars (2) | Croydon Kings | North Eastern MetroStars – Champions |
| 2015 | West Adelaide | West Adelaide | West Adelaide – Quarter-finals |
| 2016 | Adelaide City | Campbelltown City (2) | Adelaide City – Quarter-finals |
| 2017 | North Eastern MetroStars (3) | Croydon Kings (2) | Adelaide City – Quarter-finals |
| 2018 | Campbelltown City | Campbelltown City (3) | Campbelltown City – Champions |
| 2019 | Campbelltown City (2) | Campbelltown City (4) | Campbelltown City – Quarter-finals |
| 2020 | Adelaide Comets | Campbelltown City (5) | Not held due to the COVID-19 pandemic in Australia |
| 2021 | Adelaide Comets (2) | Adelaide City | Not held due to the COVID-19 pandemic in Australia |
| 2022 | Adelaide City (2) | Adelaide City (2) | Not held |
| 2023 | North Eastern MetroStars (4) | Adelaide United Youth | Not held |
| 2024 | North Eastern MetroStars (5) | Campbelltown City (6) | Not held |
| Year | Premiers | Champions | Australian Championship representation |
| 2025 | North Eastern MetroStars (6) | Croydon FC (3) | North Eastern MetroStars – Quarter-finals |
| 2026 | Adelaide City (3) | Adelaide City (3) | Adelaide City – TBD |

For details of winners pre-NPL (2006–2012):

== See also ==
- Soccer in South Australia
- National Premier Leagues
