= El Salvador (disambiguation) =

El Salvador is a country in Central America.

El Salvador may also refer to:

== Places ==
- In Chile
  - El Salvador, Chile, mining town
  - El Salvador mine
  - El Salvador (caldera)
- El Salvador, Cuba
- El Salvador, Misamis Oriental, Philippines
- El Salvador, Quito, Ecuador
- El Salvador, Zacatecas, Mexico
- Villa El Salvador, a district on the outskirts of Lima, Peru

== Music ==
- "El Salvador" (Peter, Paul and Mary song), 1982
- "El Salvador", a song by Athlete from Vehicles & Animals, 2003
- "El Salvador", a song by White Lion from Fight to Survive, 1985

== Other uses ==
- El Salvador (ship), an 18th-century Spanish treasure ship
- El Salvador (Mexico City Metrobús), a BRT station in Mexico City
- El Salvador: Another Vietnam, a 1981 documentary film
- Mezquita-Iglesia de El Salvador, Toledo, a church in Toledo, Spain

== See also ==
- Salvador (disambiguation)
- Savior (disambiguation)
