= Salvador (name) =

From the House of David

Salvador (meaning "saviour" in Catalan, Galician, Spanish, and Portuguese) is normally an indirect way of naming a Messiah.

== People with the given name ==
- Salvador Agron (1943–1986), a.k.a. "The Capeman", Puerto Rican gang member, murderer and later youth counsellor
- Salvador Allende (1908−1973), deposed president of Chile
- Salvador Aulestia (1915–1994), Spanish artist and writer
- Salvador Bacarisse (1898−1963), Spanish composer
- Salva Ballesta (born 1975), Spanish footballer
- Salvador Biondi (1926–2016), Argentine football player and manager
- Salvador Brau y Asencio (1842–1912), Puerto Rican journalist, poet, dramatist, novelist, historian and sociologist
- Salvador Dalí (1904−1989), Spanish surrealist painter
- Salvador Espriu (1913−1985), Spanish poet
- Salvador Enrique Felices (1923–1987), first Puerto Rican to reach the rank of major general in the United States Air Force
- Salvador Fidalgo (1756−1803), Spanish explorer
- Salvador Franco (died 2021), Venezuelan detainee
- Salvador Gómez (water polo) (born 1968), Spanish water polo player
- Salvador Gonzáles Escalona (1948–2021), Cuban artist
- Salvador González Marco (born 1963), Spanish footballer
- Salvador "Doy" Laurel (1928−2004), Filipino politician
- Salvador Luria (1912−1991), Italian-American scientist
- Salvador de Madariaga (1886−1978), Spanish writer
- Salvador Medialdea (born 1951), Filipino lawyer, business executive, and government administrator
- Salvador Novo (1904−1974), Mexican writer
- Salvador M. Padilla Escabi (1924–2010), Puerto Rican politician
- Salvador Panelo (fl. 1970s–2010s), Filipino politician
- Salvador Pineda (born 1952), Mexican actor
- Salvador Puig Antich (1948−1974), Spanish anarchist executed by garrote under the Francoist State
- Salvador Ramos (2004−2022), American mass murderer and perpetrator of the Robb Elementary School shooting
- Salvador Teodoro Roig Marietti (1907–1984), Superintendent of the Puerto Rico Police Department and Adjutant General of the National Guard
- Salvador Sánchez (1959−1982), Mexican boxer
- Salvador Salort-Pons (born 1970), Spanish-American museum director
- Salvador Sobral (born 1989), Portuguese Eurovision winner.
- Salvador V. Vassallo Ruiz (1942–2007), president and CEO of Vassallo Industries, headquartered in Ponce, Puerto Rico
- Salvador Volpati, Portuguese footballer
- Salvador Yaméogo, Burkinabé politician
- Salvador José Zapata (1781–1854), Spanish Galician pharmacist, philanthropist in Havana

== People with the surname ==
- António Salvador (athlete) (born 1966), Portuguese long-distance runner
- Alexya Salvador (born 1980), Brazilian reverend and teacher
- Bryce Salvador (born 1976), Canadian professional ice hockey defenceman
- Francis Salvador (1747−1776), Jewish-American patriot
- Gregorio Salvador Caja (1927–2020), Spanish linguist
- Henri Salvador (1917−2008), French singer and jazz guitarist
- Herman "Isko" Salvador (born 1958), Filipino actor and comedian, also known as Brod Pete
- Janella Salvador (born 1998), Filipina actress
- Joan Salvador i Riera (1683–1726), Spanish naturalist, pharmacist, and botanist
- Jordi Salvador (born 1964), Spanish politician
- Jorge Salvador Lara (1926−2012), Ecuadorian Foreign Minister, diplomat, columnist, writer, and historian.
- Joseph Salvador (1716−1786), head of the British East India Company, leader of the Sephardic community in Great Britain, and great-grandfather of Francis Salvador
- Julio Salvador y Díaz-Benjumea (1910–1987), Spanish general
- Kokoy Salvador (born 1967), Filipino politician
- Lou Salvador (1905−1973), Filipino basketball player
- Maja Salvador (born 1988), Filipina actress
- Phillip Salvador (born 1953), Filipino actor
- Romy Salvador (born 1998), French footballer
- Rosauro Reyes Salvador, better known as Ross Rival (1945−2007), Filipino actor
- Soledad Salvador (1957–1985), activist in the Philippines who was violently murdered by government troops
- Tod Rex Salvador (also known as Tripp Eisen), ex-guitarist of Murderdolls, Dope and Static-X

== See also ==
- Sal (name)
- Salvador (disambiguation)
- Salvatore (name)
- Salvatore (disambiguation)
