= Aulestia =

Aulestia is a surname. Notable people with the surname include:

- Elisa Ortiz de Aulestia (1909–1991), Ecuadorian teacher and writer
- Gorka Aulestia Txakartegi (born 1932), Spanish Basque literary historian and lexicographer
- Oinatz Aulestia (born 1981), Spanish footballer
- Paulina Aulestia (born 1967), Ecuadorian mountaineer
- Salvador Aulestia (1915–1994), Spanish artist and writer
- Ximena Aulestia (born 1952), Ecuadorian journalist and beauty pageant titleholder
