= Horned spurge =

Horned spurge is a common name for several plants and may refer to:

- Euphorbia brachycera, native to western North America
- Euphorbia cornigera, native to Bhutan and cultivated as an ornamental
