= San Salvatore =

San Salvatore is an Italian epithet of Jesus Christ, corresponding to the English term Holy Savior.

San Salvatore may also refer to:

== Places ==
- San Salvatore di Fitalia, Province of Messina, Italy
- San Salvatore Monferrato, Province of Alessandria, Italy
- San Salvatore Telesino, Province of Benevento, Italy
- Abbadia San Salvatore, Province of Siena, Italy
- San Salvatore, hamlet in Cogorno, Province of Genoa, Italy (see basilica under "Buildings")

== Buildings ==
Greece

- San Salvatore Monastery, former Franciscan monastery from Venetian period, Chania, Crete
- Bastion of San Salvatore, Fortifications of Chania, Crete

Italy

- Basilica of San Salvatore dei Fieschi in San Salvatore (part of Cogorno), Province of Genoa
- San Salvatore, Brescia, Lombard monastery church and a UNESCO World Cultural Heritage site
- Church of San Salvatore, Campi (collapsed at 2016 earthquakes)
- Castello San Salvatore, Province of Treviso

Malta

- Fort San Salvatore in Birgu

== Other uses ==
- San Salvatore (film), 1955 West German film
- Monte San Salvatore, small mountain in Lugano, in Italian-speaking Switzerland

== See also ==
- Salvatore (disambiguation)
- Salvador
- Salvator
- San Salvador
