= Totuccio =

Totuccio is an Italian nickname for someone called Salvatore. It's a diminutive of Totò.

Notable people nicknamed Totuccio:

- Salvatore Contorno (born 1946), a former member of the Sicilian Mafia who turned into a state witness against Cosa Nostra
- Salvatore Inzerillo (1944–1981), an Italian criminal, a member of the Sicilian Mafia
