= Volpati =

Volpati is a surname. Notable people with the surname include:

- Giovanni Battista Volpati (1633–1706), Italian painter of the Baroque period
- Salvador Volpati (fl. 1970s), Portuguese footballer

== See also ==
- Volpato, surname
