= Savior =

Savior or saviour may refer to:

- A person who helps people achieve salvation, or saves them from something

== Religion ==
- Mahdi, the prophesied redeemer of Islam who will rule for seven, nine or nineteen years
- Maitreya
- Messiah, a saviour or liberator of a group of people, most commonly in the Abrahamic religions
  - Messiah in Judaism
  - Jesus as the savior or redeemer in Christianity
- Zoroastrian tradition envisions three future saviors, including Saoshyant, [sou-shyuhnt] a figure of Zoroastrian eschatology who brings about the final renovation of the world, the Frashokereti
- Soter, derives from the Greek epithet σωτήρ (sōtēr), meaning a saviour, a deliverer

== Film and television ==
- The Savior (1971 film), French film about a girl and a Nazi officer
- The Savior (2014 film), Arabic-language film about Jesus of Nazareth
- The Saviour (Chinese: 救世者 Jiushizhe), a 1980 film directed Ronny Yu
- The Saviour (film) 2005 Australian short film
- "The Savior" (Once Upon a Time), the first episode of the sixth season of the American fantasy drama series Once Upon a Time
- Savior (film), 1998 film starring Dennis Quaid, Stellan Skarsgård and Nastassja Kinski
- "Saviors" (House), the 21st episode of the fifth season of Fox television series House

== Music ==
- Saviours (band), an American heavy metal band

=== Albums ===
- Saviour (album), by Antimatter, or the title song, 2001
- Savior (album), by Metro Station, or the title song, 2015
- Savior, by 1300Saint, 2025
- Saviour, by Rage, 1993
- Savior, an EP by AB6IX, or the title song, 2022
- Saviors (album), by Green Day, or the title song, 2024

=== Songs ===
- "Saviour" (Anggun song), 2005
- "Savior" (Iggy Azalea song), 2018
- "Saviour" (Lights song), 2009
- "Savior" (Rise Against song), 2008
- "Savior" (Skillet song), 2003
- "Savior", by 30 Seconds to Mars from A Beautiful Lie, 2005
- "Saviour", by Alicia Keys from As I Am, 2007
- "Saviour", by Black Veil Brides from Set the World on Fire, 2011
- "Saviour", by Chipmunk from I Am Chipmunk, 2009
- "Saviour", by Circa Waves from What's It Like Over There?, 2019
- "Saviour", by Dredg from The Pariah, the Parrot, the Delusion, 2009
- "Saviour", by George Ezra from Staying at Tamara's, 2018
- "Saviour", by Jacob Collier from In My Room, 2016
- "Savior", by Kendrick Lamar from Mr. Morale & the Big Steppers, 2022
- "Savior", by Lee Hi from 4 Only, 2021
- "Savior", by Monsta X from The X, 2025
- "Savior", by Norther from N, 2008
- "Savior", by OneRepublic from Human, 2021
- "Saviour", by Prince from Emancipation, 1996
- "Savior", by Red Hot Chili Peppers from Californication, 1999
- "Savior", by Sombr, 2024
- "Savior", by St. Vincent from Masseduction, 2017
- "Saviour", by VNV Nation from Empires, 1999

== Other ==
- "Savior", a 2000 short science fiction story by Nancy Kress
- Saviour (comics), a 1988 comic book published by Trident Comics
- sAviOr, an alias for Ma Jae-Yoon, former professional StarCraft player in Korea
- Windecker SAVIOR, an American unmanned aircraft
- The Saviour (paramilitary organization) (Спас), a militant nationalist organization in Russia

== See also ==
- Salvador (disambiguation)
- Salvator (disambiguation)
- Salvatore (disambiguation)
