= Salvatore (name) =

Salvatore (pronounced [salvaˈtoːre]) is an Italian name meaning "Saviour". People named Salvatore include:

== Given name ==
=== A ===
- Salvatore Accardo (born 1941), Italian violin virtuoso and conductor
- Salvatore Accursi (born 1978), Italian football player
- Salvatore Adamo (born 1943), Belgian singer
- Salvatore Adduce (born 1955), Italian politician
- Salvatore Agnelli (1817-1874), Italian composer
- Salvatore Albano (1841-1893), Italian sculptor
- Salvatore Aldisio (1890-1964), Italian politician
- Salvatore Alepus (1503-1568), Spanish archbishop
- Salvatore Allegra (1898–1993), Italian composer
- Salvatore Aloi (born 1996), Italian football player
- Salvatore Amirante (born 1984), Italian footballer
- Salvatore Amitrano (born 1975), Italian rower
- Salvatore Andò (born 1945), Italian politician
- Salvatore Angerami (1956-2019), Italian prelate
- Salvatore Antibo (born 1962), Italian long-distance runner
- Salvatore Antonio (fl. 1990s–2010s), Canadian actor
- Salvatore D'Aquila (1877–1928), New York City Mafia boss
- Salvatore Aquino (1944–2025), Italian criminal
- Salvatore Aranzulla (born 1990), Italian blogger
- Salvatore Aronica (born 1978), Italian football player
- Salvatore Asta (1915-2004), Italian prelate
- Salvatore Attardo (fl. 1990s–2020s), Belgian professor
- Salvatore Aurelio (born 1986), Italian footballer
- Salvatore Auteri-Manzocchi (1845-1924), Italian composer
- Salvatore Avallone (born 1969), Italian footballer
- Salvatore Avellino (born 1935), American mobster

=== B ===
- Salvatore Babones (born 1969), American sociologist
- Salvatore Baccaloni (1900–1969), Italian operatic bass, buffo artist, and actor
- Salvatore Baccaro (1932–1984), Italian character actor
- Salvatore Bagni (born 1956), Italian footballer
- Salvatore Barone (born 1995), American soccer player
- Salvatore Barzilai (1860–1939), Italian journalist and politician
- Salvatore Battaglia (born 1973) Italian light-welterweight boxer
- Salvatore "Tory" Belleci (born 1972), American filmmaker known for his role in MythBusters
- Salvatore Bellomo (1951–2019), Belgian professional wrestler
- Salvatore Bettiol (born 1961), Italian long-distance runner
- Salvatore Boccaccio (1938–2008), Italian Roman Catholic bishop
- Salvatore Bocchetti (born 1986), Italian football defender
- Salvatore Bonafede (born 1962), Italian composer and pianist
- Salvatore "Bill" Bonanno (1932–2008), son of Mafia boss Joseph Bonanno
- Salvatore Boniello (1928–2010), Italian historian and writer
- Salvatore “Sonny” Bono (1935-1998), musician, and politician
- Salvatore Borgh (fl. 1990s–2000s), Canadian soccer player
- Salvatore Brullo (born 1947), Italian professor of botany
- Salvatore Bruno (born 1979), Italian football striker
- Salvatore Burrai (born 1987), Italian professional footballer
- Salvatore Burruni (1933–2004), Italian flyweight and bantamweight boxer

=== C ===
- Salvatore Calderone (1876-1929), American businessman
- Salvatore Cassano (born 1945), fire chief of New York City, New York
- Salvatore Contorno (born 1946), former Mafioso and state witness
- Salvatore Cordileone (born 1956), American prelate of the Catholic Church, and the current Archbishop of San Francisco
- Salvatore Cuffaro (born 1958), Italian politician

=== D ===
- Salvatore Di Giacomo (1860–1934), Italian poet
- Salvatore Dierna (1934-2016), Italian architect

=== E ===
- Sully Erna (birth name Salvatore) (born 1968), American musician
- Salvatore Esposito, multiple people

=== F ===
- Salvatore Ferragamo (1898–1960), fashion designer

=== G ===
- Salvatore Ganacci, Swedish music producer and DJ
- Salvatore Giancana, Chicago Outfit mobster
- Salvatore Giuliano (1922–1950), Sicilian bandit
- Salvatore Giunta (born 1985), US Army staff sergeant and a recipient of the Medal of Honor
- Salvatore "Sammy the Bull" Gravano (born 1945), American mobster, former underboss of the Gambino crime family
- Salvatore Greco, multiple people
- Salvatore Guaragna (1893–1981), birth name of Harry Warren, American composer

=== H ===
- Salvatore da Horta (1520–1567), Spanish saint

=== I ===
- Salvatore Inzerillo (1944–1981), Sicilian Mafioso

=== L ===
- Salvatore Lima (1928–1992), Italian politician
- Salvatore Lo Piccolo (born 1942), also known as the Baron (il Barone), Sicilian mafioso
- Salvatore Lorusso (fl. 1970s–2020s), Italian chemist and art historian
- Salvatore Lucania (1897–1962), also known as Charlie 'Lucky' Luciano, Sicilian-American mafioso

=== M ===
- Salvatore Maceo (1894–1951), Sicilian-American Mafioso
- Salvatore Maranzano (1886–1931), Sicilian-American Mafioso
- Salvatore Mineo (1939–1976), American actor
- Salvatore Montagna (1971–2011), former acting boss of the Bonanno crime family
- Salvatore Mancuso Gómez (1964–present), former acting leader of the Colombian paramilitary group AUC
- Salvatore Mesi, Chicago mobster

=== P ===
- Salvatore Pappalardo, multiple people
- Salvatore Pincherle (1853–1936), Italian mathematician

=== Q ===
- Salvatore Quasimodo (1901–1968), Italian author and poet

=== R ===
- Salvatore Riina (1930–2017), Sicilian mafioso
- Sal Rinauro (born 1982), American professional wrestler

=== S ===
- Salvatore Schillaci (born 1964), Italian football player
- Salvatore Sirigu (born 1987), Italian football player

=== T ===
- Salvatore Tavano (born 1980), Italian auto racing driver
- Salvatore Todaro, multiple people

=== V ===
- Salvatore Vasapolli (born 1955), photographer, artist
- Salvatore Valitutti (1907–1992), Italian educator and politician
- Salvatore Viganò (1769–1821), Italian choreographer, dancer and composer
- Salvatore Di Vittorio (born 1967), Italian composer and conductor
- Salvatore Vulcano (born 1976), American comedian, actor, and member of The Tenderloins

== Middle name ==
- Dominic Salvatore Gentile (1920−1951), United States Army Air Forces officer

== Surname ==
- Anna Salvatore (1923–1978), Italian painter
- Bennett Salvatore (born 1960), former American professional basketball referee in the National Basketball Association (NBA)
- Chris Salvatore (born 1985), American actor, singer-songwriter, model
- Dominick Salvatore (1940–2026), American economist
- Federico Salvatore (1959–2023), Italian singer-songwriter
- Giovanni Salvatore (ca. 1620–1688), Italian composer and organist
- Giuseppe di Salvatore (born 1989), Canadian sport shooter
- Hilary Salvatore (born 1980), American film and television actress
- Jack Salvatore Jr. (born 1989), American writer, ghostwriter, and actor
- Lucio Salvatore (born 1975), Italian-born multidisciplinary Brazilian artist
- Marco Salvatore (born 1986), Austrian professional association football player
- Nick Salvatore (born 1943), American historian
- Nino Salvatore (1932–1997), Italian endocrinologist
- R. A. Salvatore (born 1959), fiction writer

== Fictional ==
- Salvatore Di Vita (nicknamed Totò), the protagonist of the 1988 film Cinema Paradiso, played by Salvatore Cascio as a child, Marco Leonardi as a teenager and Jacques Perrin as an adult
- Salvatore, a character in the novel The Name of the Rose
- Stefan Salvatore, a vampire from The Vampire Diaries novel series
- Stefan Salvatore and Damon Salvatore, characters from the CW series The Vampire Diaries
- Salvatore Leone, one of the characters featured in video games of Grand Theft Auto (series)
- Salvatore "Sal" Marcano. The main antagonist of the video game Mafia III
- Salvatore Moreau, an antagonist from 2021 video game Resident Evil Village
- Salvatore "Sal" Romano, Sterling Cooper's art director in the AMC dramatic television series Mad Men
- Salvatore "Sal" Tessio, a character in the 1969 novel The Godfather and its 1972 film adaptation
- Salvatore "Sal" Paradise, protagonist in the novel On the Road by Jack Kerouac
- Salvatore "Big Pussy" Bonpensiero, character from the HBO series The Sopranos
- Salvatore "Creepy Sal" Kazlaukas, character in Superstore
- A character in The Equalizer 3

== See also ==
- Sal (name)
- Salvador (name)
