= Salvarani =

Salvarani may refer to:

- Claudia Salvarani (born 1975), former Italian female middle-distance runner
- Salvarani (cycling team), Italian professional cycling team

== See also ==
- Salvatori
