= Northern Mexico =

Northern Mexico Norte de México (Spanish)
- Cultural region of Mexico
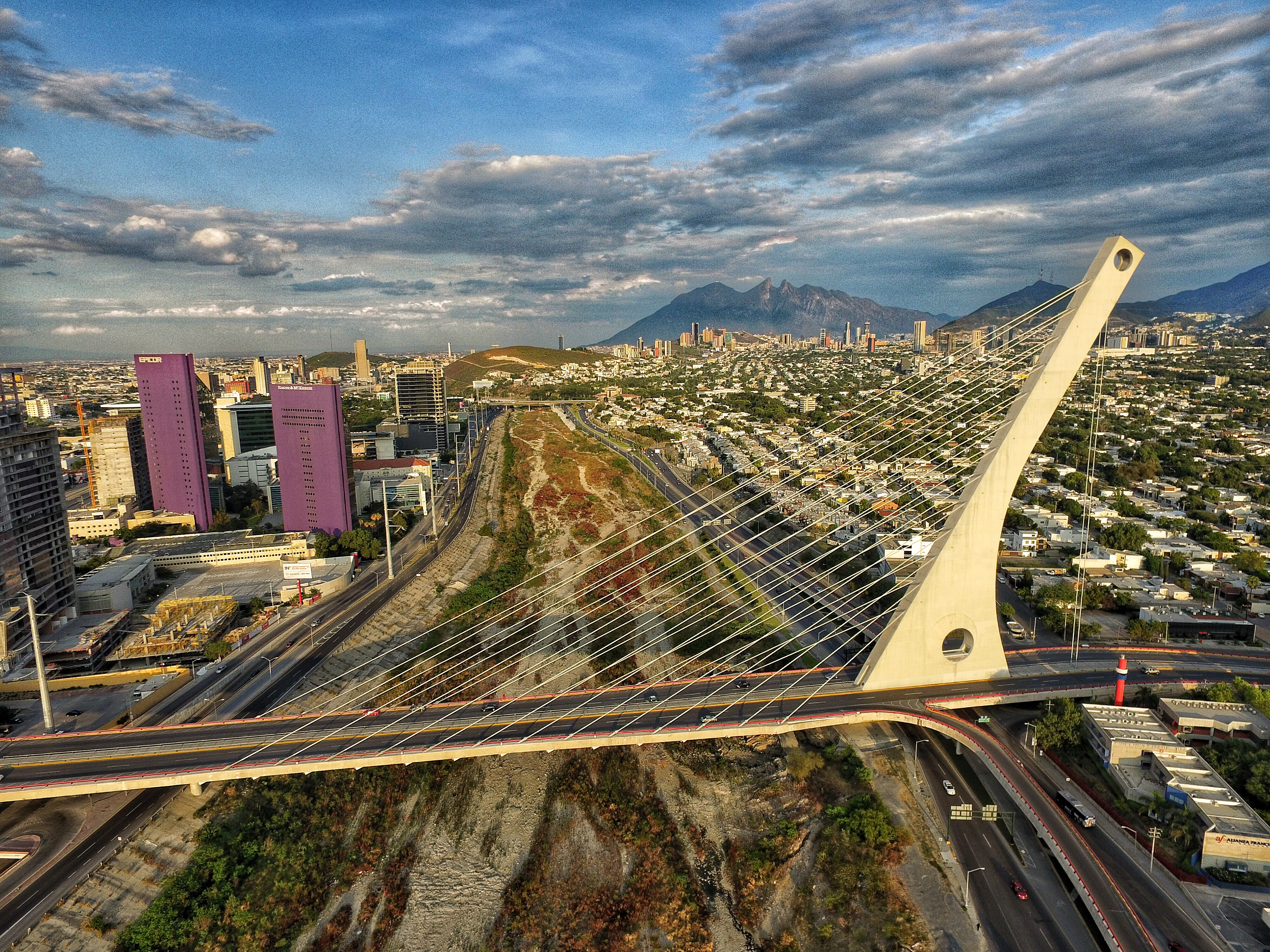
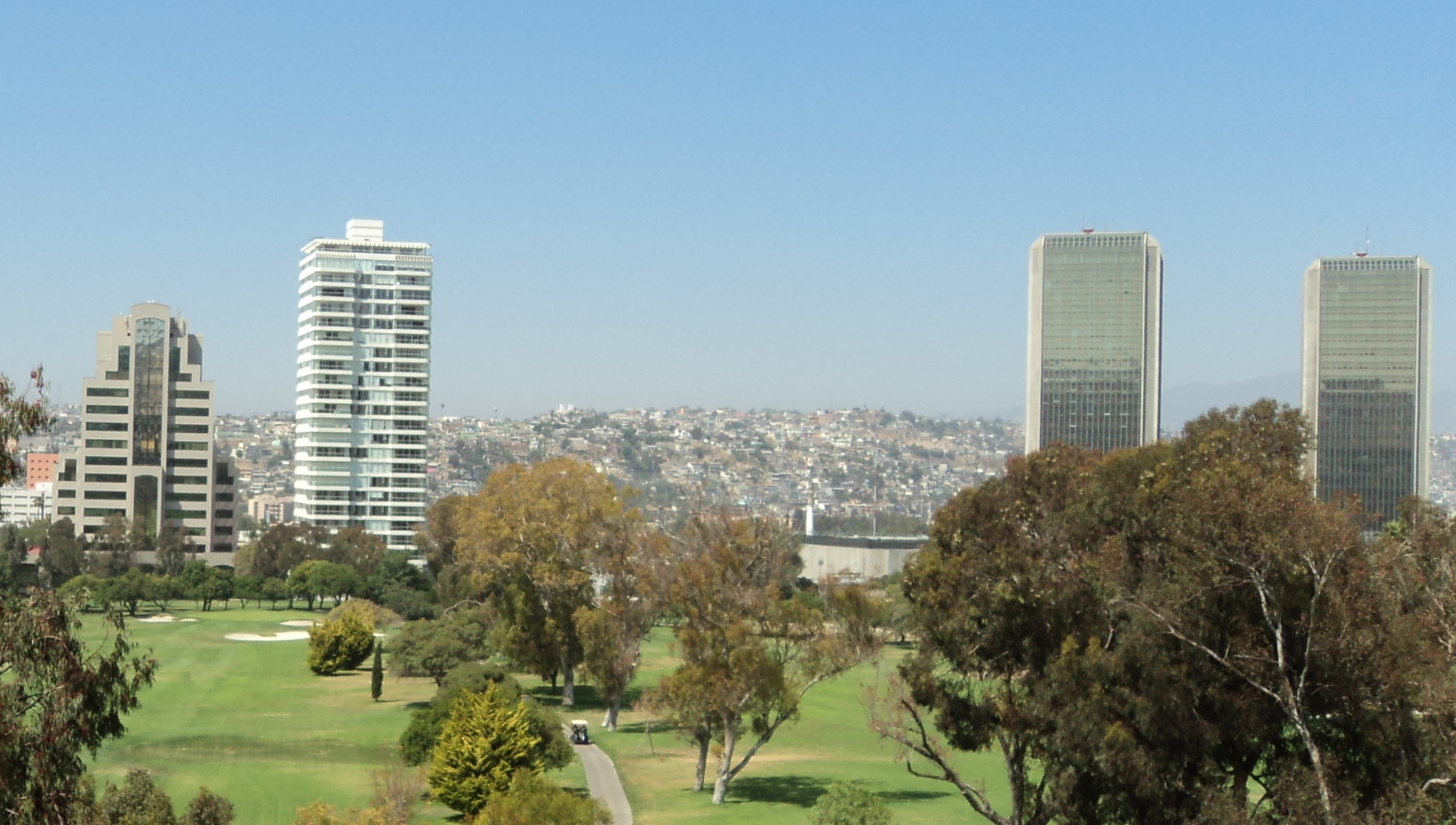
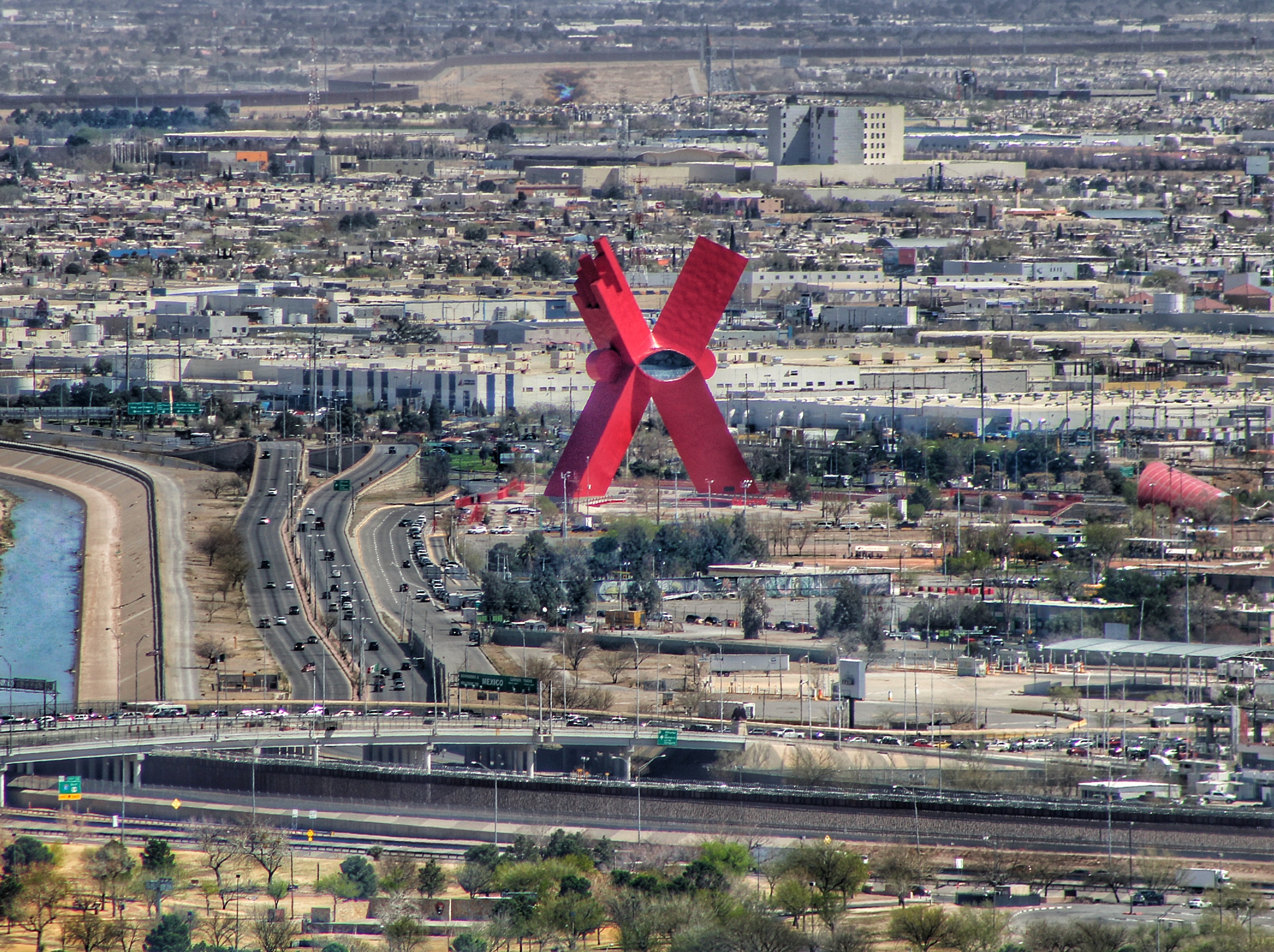
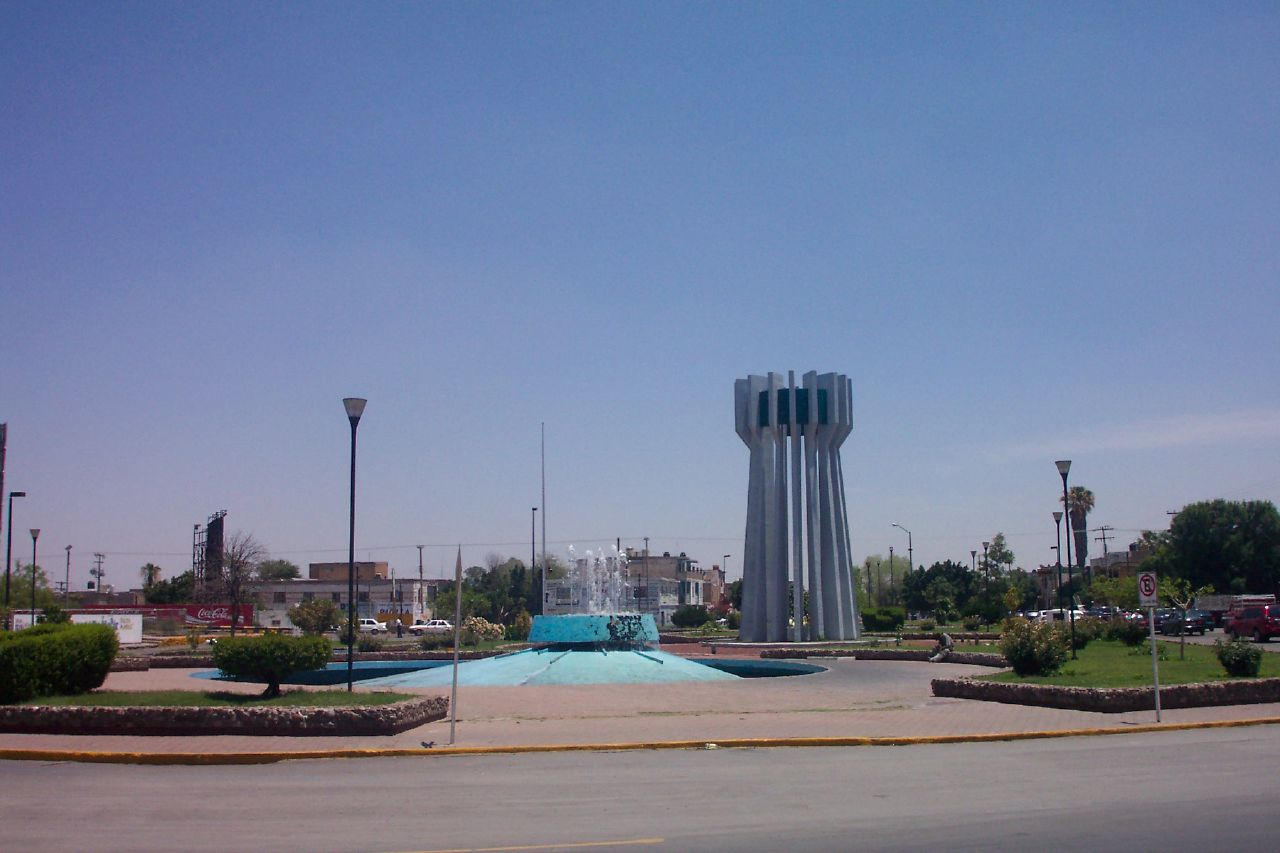
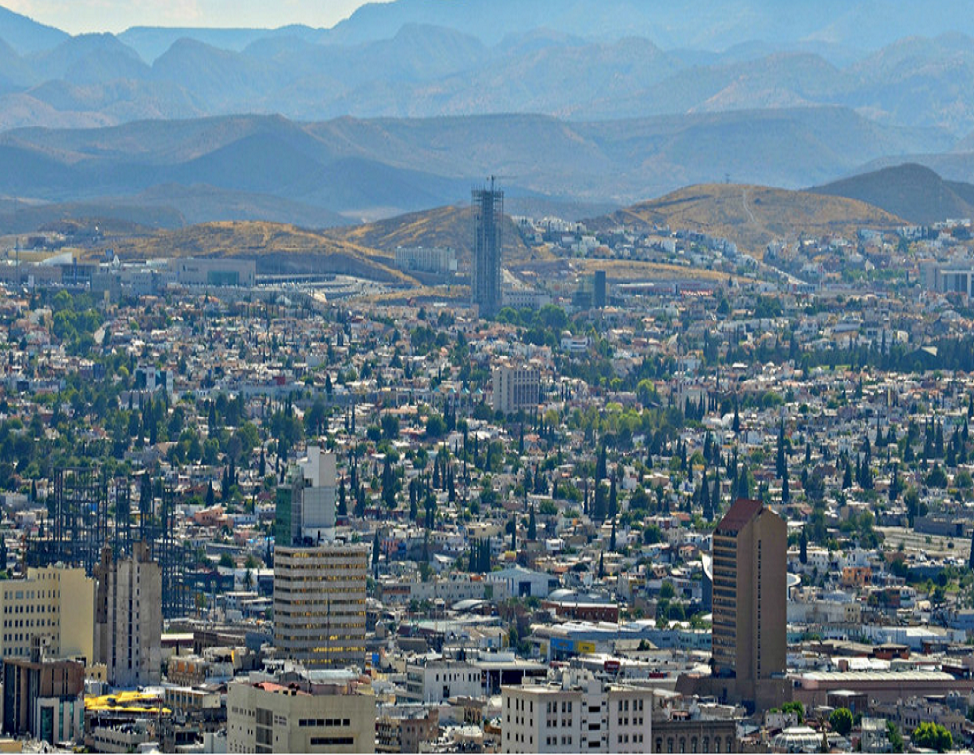
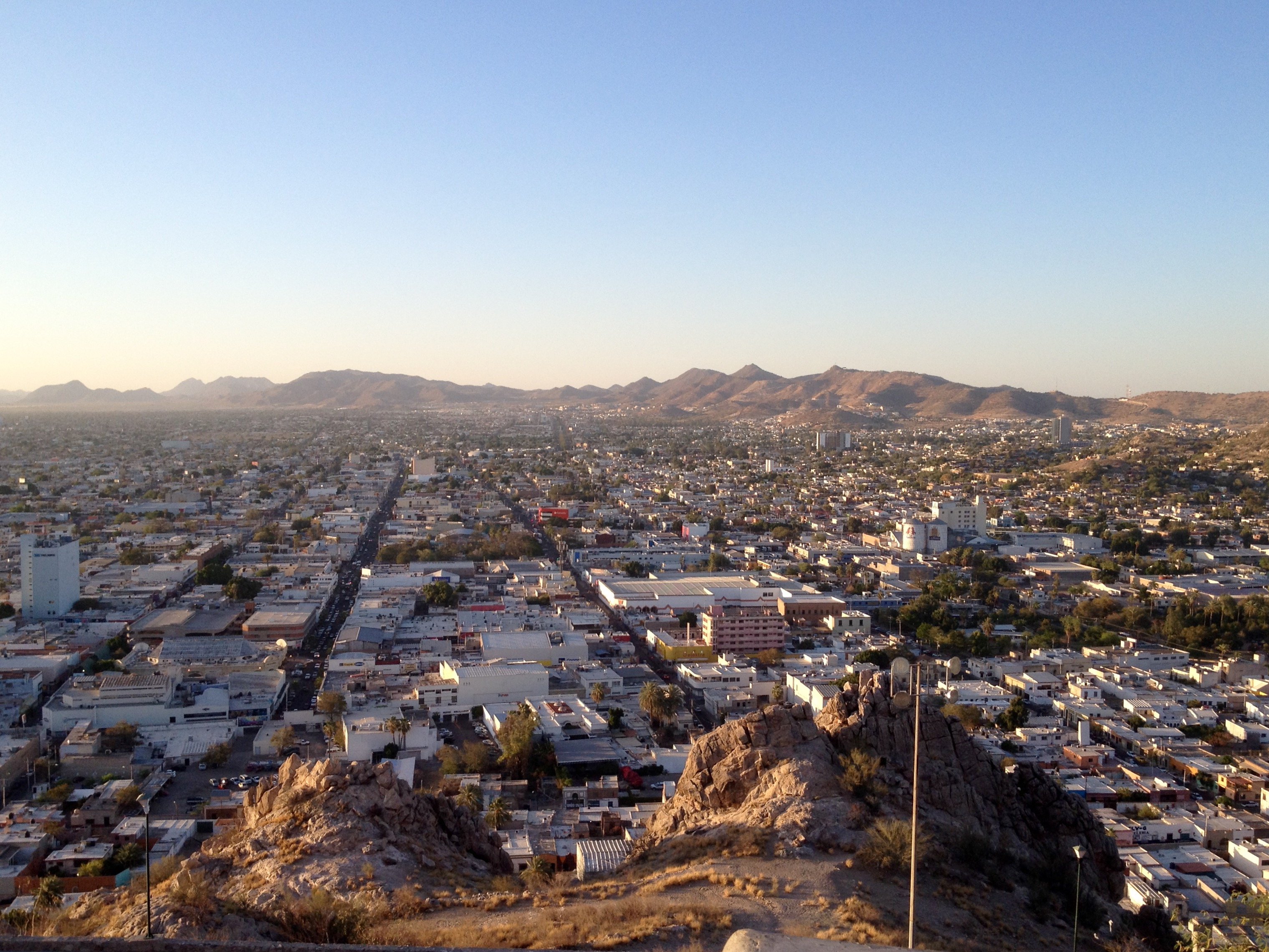
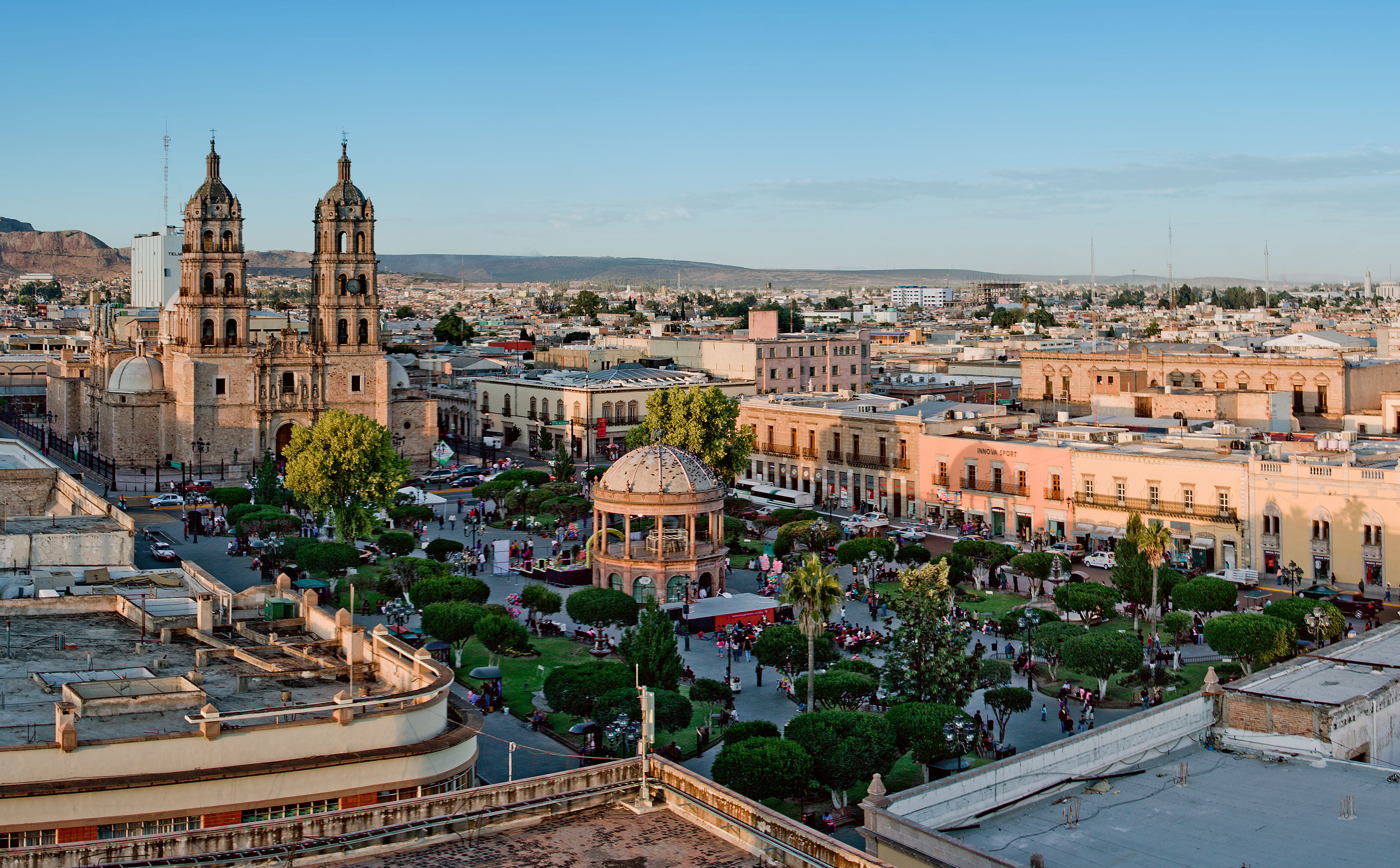
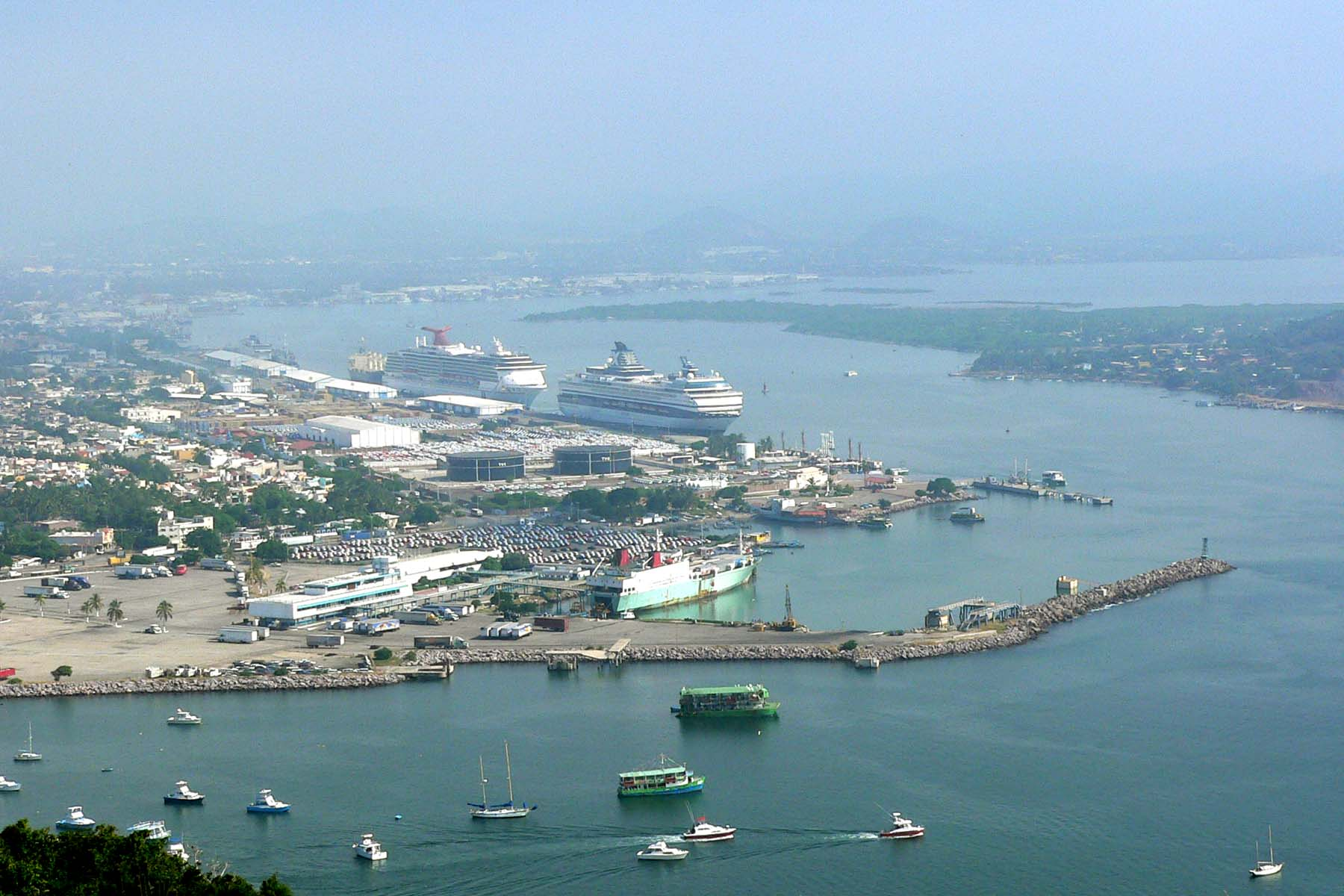
- Left-right from top: Monterrey, Tijuana, Ciudad Juárez, Torreón, Chihuahua, Hermosillo, Durango and Mazatlán.
- Etymology: La tierra al norte del trópico (in Spanish); The land above the tropic (in English).
- Nicknames: Aridoamerica, el Norti (local pronunciation)
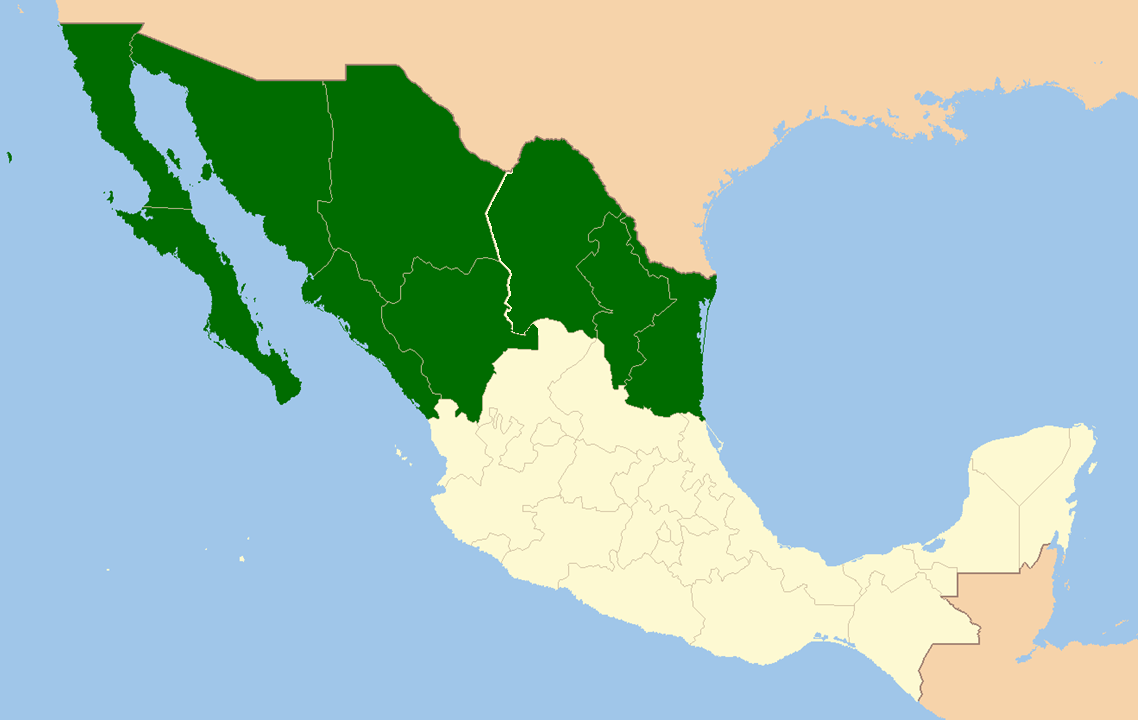
- States: Baja California, Baja California Sur, Chihuahua, Coahuila, Durango, Nuevo León, Sinaloa, Sonora and Tamaulipas
- Largest city: Tijuana
- Largest metro: Greater Monterrey

Area
  - Total: 1,054,549 km^{2} (407,164 sq mi)

Population
  - Total: 27,056,627
  - Density: 25.65706/km^{2} (66.45148/sq mi)
- Demonym(s): Norteño, norteña

Northern Mexico (Spanish: el Norte de México, pronounced [el ˈnoɾte ðe ˈmexiko]), commonly referred as the North (Spanish: El Norte), is an informal term for the northern cultural and geographical area in Mexico. Depending on the source, it contains some or all of the states of Baja California, Baja California Sur, Chihuahua, Coahuila, Durango, Nuevo León, Sinaloa, Sonora, Tamaulipas, and northern Zacatecas.

There is no specific border that separates the northern states from the southern states in Mexico. For some authors, only states that have a border with the United States are considered as northern Mexico, i.e. Baja California, Chihuahua, Coahuila, Nuevo León, Sonora and Tamaulipas. Others also include Durango, Sinaloa and Baja California Sur. Other people consider that the north starts above the Tropic of Cancer, but this description would include some parts of Zacatecas such as Rio Grande, Miguel Auza, Juan Aldama, General Fransico R. Murgia, Villa de Cos, Mazapil, Concepción del Oro, Melchor Ocampo, and El Salvador, and including northern San Luis.

The region shares some common characteristics, such as its predominantly dry, desert climate, though temperate climates are also present. Its diverse topography includes high-altitude areas like the Sierra de Baja California on the Baja California peninsula, the Sierra Madre Oriental, and the Sierra Madre Occidental, as well as low-lying areas such as the Pacific coastal plain and the Gulf coastal plain. Some authors suggest it is the cultural stronghold of the former General Command of the Interior Provinces.

== History ==
=== Before colonization ===
It is not known precisely when the first settlers came to northern Mexico. The harsh climate in the region limited the practice of agriculture, so ancient cultures developed a nomadic lifestyle dedicated to hunting and gathering.

One of the most important native cultures in northern Mexico are the Tepehuanes of Durango, whose autonym is Odami "people from the mountains". Similarly, the Rarámuri "people who run" of Chihuahua are called the Tarahumaras by outsiders. Other important cultures are the Mayos in Sinaloa and Sonora, the Yaquis in Sonora, and the Laguneros of Laguna Pueblo in Coahuila. In Nuevo León, many nomads were exterminated for resisting the construction of Monterrey.

=== Colonial era ===
The first city of the region was Durango, founded in 1563 by Francisco de Ibarra, a Basque explorer. During the colonial era, Durango, Chihuahua and some parts of Sinaloa and Coahuila were a Basque colony named the Nueva Vizcaya. Now, most Duranguenses are Basque descendants. Other important cities like Monterrey were founded almost 50 years later.

The Spanish rulers expanded the northern frontier of the colony through centuries of difficult conquest. In the late 18th century, they established a punitive policy to defend against indigenous raids from the north. During this period, they also established separate governance for the northern regions, which were thought of as "interior provinces" from the perspective of people in Mexico City.

=== Postcolonial era ===
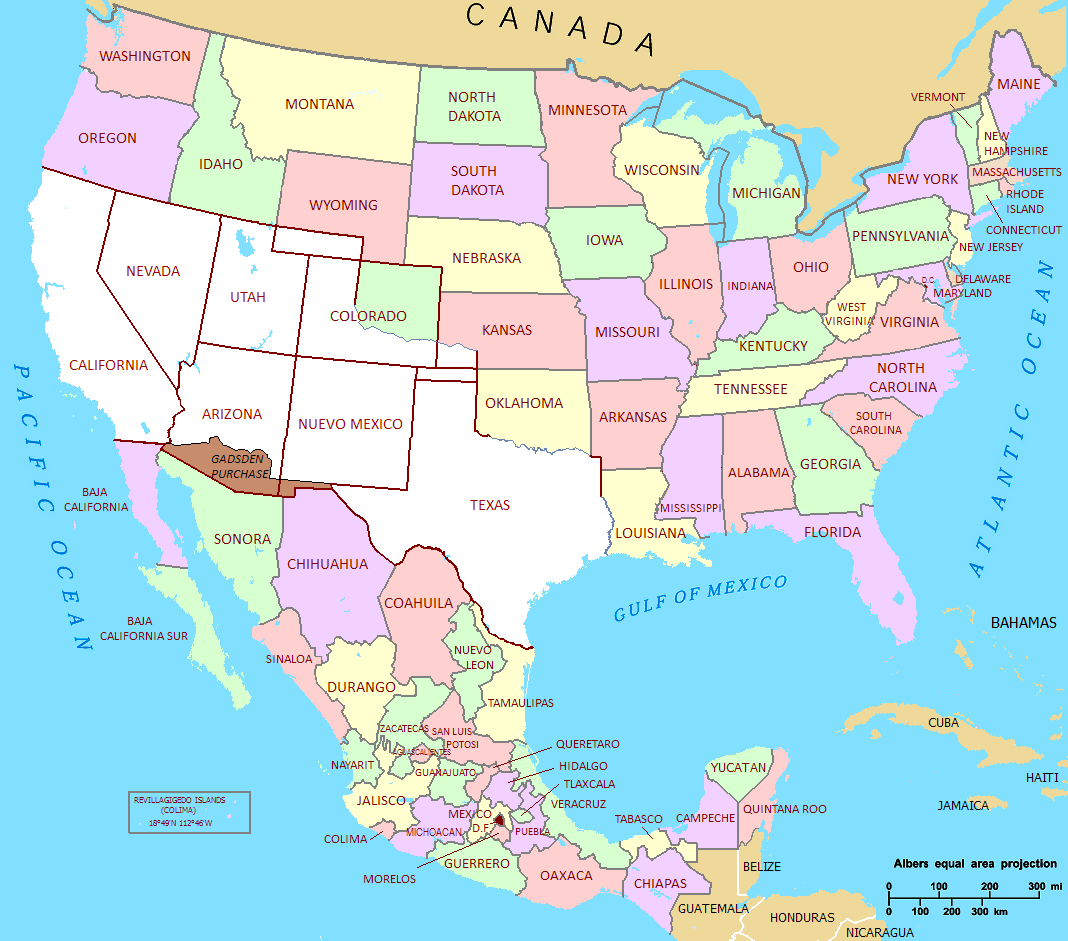
The white and brown territories comprised Northern Mexico until they were conquered by the United States in the mid-19th century

Northern Mexico's proximity to the United States became a major factor in the region's postcolonial history, as the northern half of Mexico was annexed into the United States by the mid-19th century. During the Porfiriato, the region's traditionally agricultural economy was disrupted as it became the focus of capital investments from the United States and the rest of Mexico.

== States ==
Baja California	Baja California Sur	Chihuahua
Mexicali	La Paz	Chihuahua
Coahuila	Durango	Nuevo León
Saltillo	Durango	Monterrey
Sinaloa	Sonora	Tamaulipas
Culiacán	Hermosillo	Ciudad Victoria

== Culture ==
Northern Mexican culture is very different from the culture in south and central Mexico. Northern Mexican opinion tends to be more conservative on average on cultural topics like abortion, gay marriage and legalization of marijuana, but more liberal on topics like business or technology.

In early 2014, the Strategic Communication Cabinet, a statistical consulting services company, published a report called "Social Intolerance In Mexico", in which polls that covered several social issues were conducted in the 45 largest cities and municipalities of the country. Aside from liberal Mexico City, the federal capital, the study found the strongest support for same-sex marriage in northern cities such as Tijuana and La Paz; whereas it was the weakest in Durango, Ciudad Victoria, Chihuahua and Monterrey. As for adoption by same-sex couples, it was more widely accepted in the border cities of Tijuana and Ciudad Juárez, while the least support was found in Chihuahua and Durango. Support for abortion upon request, cannabis legalisation and euthanasia was the weakest in northern Mexico. Nonetheless, Coahuila became the first state to legalise same-sex marriage in the country.

=== Festivities ===
Some important days in the north are July 8, the foundation of Durango (the first city founded in the North) and the carnaval of Mazatlán, celebrated 6 days before Ash Wednesday.

=== Cuisine ===
As well as the Spanish and the Indigenous people, northern Mexico has received Lebanese, Jewish, Portuguese, Chinese, Irish, German, Italian and Spanish immigrants. All this mixture of cultures has strongly influenced the cuisine from the north. Northern Mexican gastronomy is based on beef, goat and pig meat and flour tortillas. Because of the German influence cheese and dairy products are also important in the cuisine of the region.

Nachos, quesadillas, and burritos are probably the three most famous dishes from the north. One of the most famous customs from northern Mexico is to reunite family and friends on weekends to prepare barbecue, named Carne Asada by the Mexicans. A variation of this tradition is to prepare discada, a mixture of grilled meats cooked on an agricultural plow disk harrow.

=== Sports ===
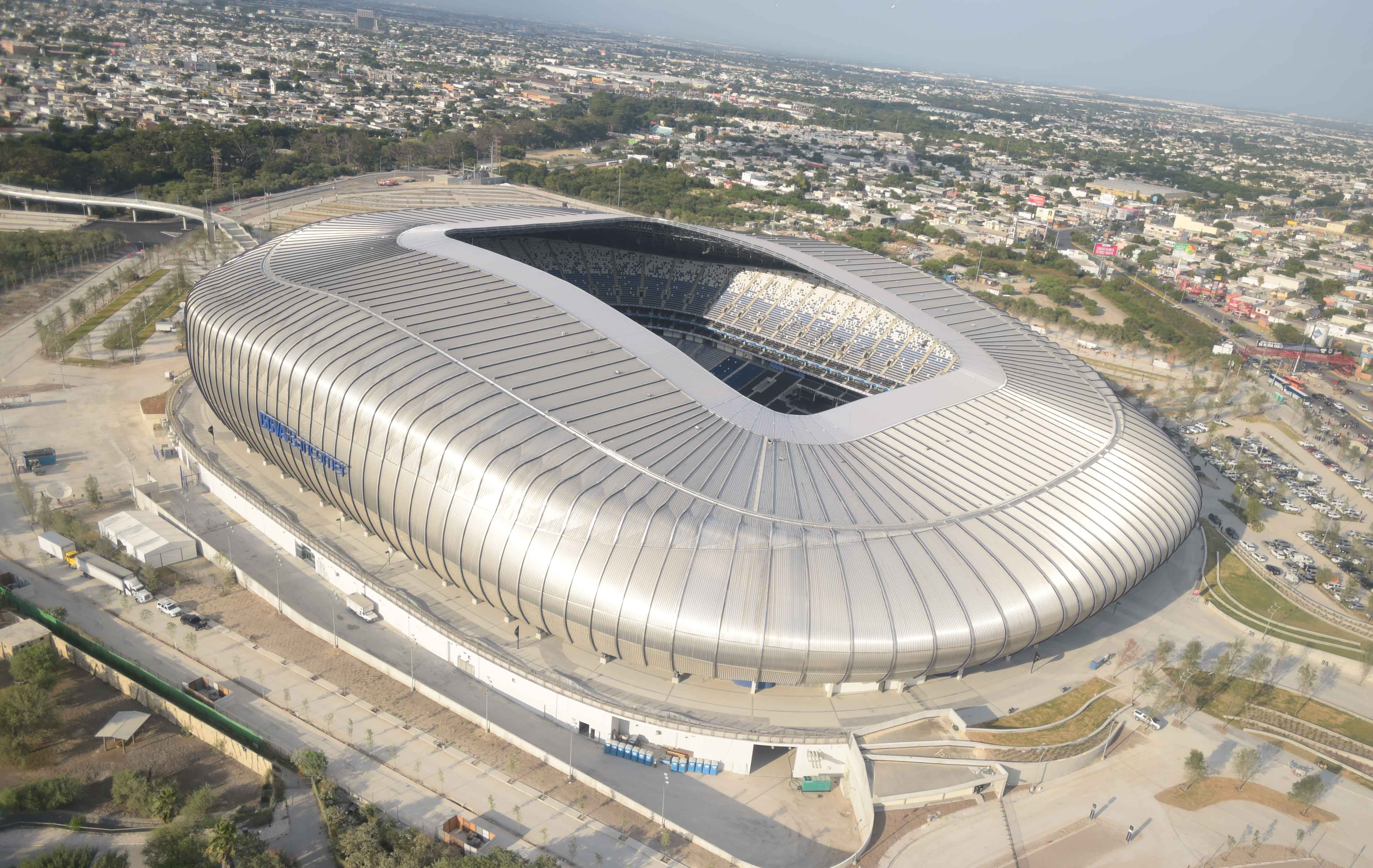
The 53,500-capacity Estadio BBVA Bancomer, home to football team Monterrey, hosted some matches of the 2026 FIFA World Cup, which was held in North America.

Association football (Mexican Spanish: fútbol) is one of the region's most popular sports, as it hosts five out of the eighteen teams that currently play in the Liga MX, the country's top division of the domestic football league system. Major cities are home to these teams such as Monterrey and Tigres UANL, both based in Monterrey, Santos Laguna in Torreón, Tijuana in the border city of the same name and Juárez based on the homonymous border city of Juárez. Notably, Northern teams have dominated the Liga MX in the 2010s, winning a combined total of nine titles and reaching more than half of the decade's finals. Moreover, Northern teams that play in the Ascenso MX, the second professional level of the domestic football system, include Dorados de Sinaloa from Culiacán, Cimarrones de Sonora in Hermosillo, Tampico Madero and Correcaminos UAT, both based in the state of Tamaulipas.

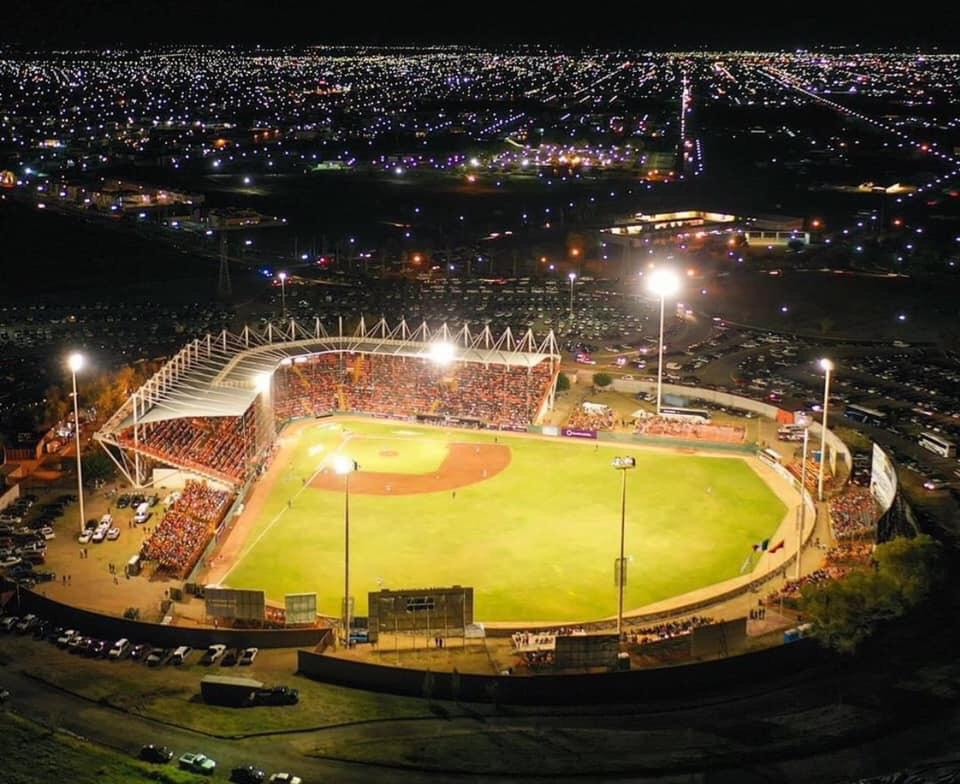
Baseball stadium in Chihuahua

Baseball is another popular sport in northern Mexico, particularly in states such as Sinaloa and Sonora. Seven of the sixteen teams of the Triple-A Mexican League, the country's oldest running professional league, are based in the North: Sultanes de Monterrey, Saraperos de Saltillo, Acereros de Monclova, Algodoneros de Unión Laguna, Generales de Durango, Tecolotes de los Dos Laredos and Toros de Tijuana. Of these, three (Saraperos, Acereros, and Algodoneros) are based in Coahuila, which is thus the only state to have more than one team in the league, and one of only three states or provinces to have three teams in Triple-A baseball (the others being Texas and New York). Sultanes de Monterrey has been the most successful Northern team in the Mexican League, winning ten championships (the third most of any team), but Tecolotes, Saraperos, and Algodoneros all have multiple titles to their names. In winter-league play, the independent Mexican Pacific League (Liga Mexicana del Pacífico or LMP) is based in the North, with most of its eight teams playing in Northwestern Mexico. The league is considered competitive, as the winter schedule coincides with the Major League Baseball offseason and MLB players can participate. Since the 1970s, the winner of the Mexican Pacific League has competed in the prestigious Caribbean Series, won nine times by Mexican teams, primarily in the 21st century, such as Yaquis de Obregón and Naranjeros de Hermosillo, based in the state of Sonora, Venados de Mazatlán and Tomateros de Culiacán, both based in the state of Sinaloa. Moreover, there are several minor state-wide baseball leagues in the region such as Liga Estatal de Béisbol de Chihuahua, Liga Mayor de Béisbol de La Laguna and Liga Norte de México.

Another popular sport is basketball, played at the professional level throughout the entire year between the National Basketball League, founded in 2000, and the Pacific Coast Circuit, which exclusively involves teams based in Northwestern Mexico. The Liga de Básquetbol Estatal de Chihuahua is a minor league played primarily by local teams in the border state of Chihuahua. Remarkably, Chihuahua-born Eduardo Nájera became the second Mexican to play in the National Basketball Association (NBA), after Sinaloa-born Horacio Llamas. As for American football, National Football League (NFL) following is popular in several northern cities, particularly amongst the middle and upper classes. Notably, Torreón-born kicker Raúl Allegre played for several NFL teams throughout his career in the 1980s.

In combat sports, boxing is the most popular sports in the country and northern Mexico has long been a source of world-famous boxers such as Baby Arizmendi, Clemente Sánchez, Julio César Chávez, Erik Morales, Jorge Arce and Jorge Paez. In mixed martial arts (MMA), world champions born in this region include Brandon Moreno and Yair Rodríguez of the Ultimate Fighting Championship. In taekwondo, María Espinoza stands out, an Olympic medalist in three consecutive editions.

=== Dialect ===
Northern Mexican Spanish distinguishes itself from other varieties of Spanish spoken in the country for its strong intonation. Due to its proximity to the United States, it receives a great deal of influence from English. For example, English words such as troca (truck), lonche (lunch) and bai (bye) are of common usage.

In addition to Spanish, there are also many Indigenous languages, with Tepehuan, Mayo, and Tarahumara being among the largest and most prominent. However, another important difference between the North and South-Central Spanish is that northern Mexico Spanish has not received as much Native American influence as Central and South Mexico Spanish, this is because northern Mexico has the lowest concentration of Indigenous communities of all regions in the country and there is not a single Indigenous language that surpasses 100,000 speakers.

Curiously, in Spanish dubs from English language films or TV series, it is a cliche to associate the Northern Mexican accent with people from Australia or Southern USA, so a lot of Hispanics wrongly associate Northern Mexican Spanish with Australian English and Southern American English.

== See also ==
- Bajío
- Mexican plateau
