= Pappalardo =

Pappalardo is a southern Italian family name, literally translating to 'lard-eater'. It may refer to:

== People ==
- Adriano Pappalardo (born 1945), Italian singer, actor and television personality
- Bruno Pappalardo, archivist and naval historian of the British National Archives
- Gianfranco Pappalardo Fiumara (born 1978), Italian pianist
- Neil Pappalardo, American businessman, chairman of MEDITECH
- Paolo Pappalardo (1903–1966), Italian prelate of the Catholic Church, diplomat of the Holy See
- Salvatore Pappalardo, multiple people
- Tom Pappalardo (born 1973), American graphic designer, author, illustrator and musician

== Fictional characters ==
- Federico "Derek" Pappalardo, a character in the video game Mafia II
- Vinnie Pappalardo, a character in the video game Lego City Undercover

== Other uses ==
- 4241 Pappalardo, a main-belt asteroid
- Bonelli Erede Pappalardo, an Italian law firm

== See also ==
- Pappalardi
