= Concepción del Oro =

City in Zacatecas, Mexico

Coordinates: 24°37′N 101°25′W

Concepción del Oro is the largest city and the seat of the Concepción del Oro Municipality in the Mexican state of Zacatecas. One of the oldest cities in Mexico, Concepción del Oro was founded in 1587.
