= Salvatore Pappalardo =

Salvatore Pappalardo may refer to:

- Salvatore Pappalardo (cardinal) (1918–2006), Italian Roman Catholic cardinal
- Salvatore Pappalardo (archbishop of Siracusa) (born 1945), Italian Roman Catholic prelate
- Salvatore Pappalardo (composer) (1817–1884), Italian composer and conductor

== See also ==
- Pappalardo
- Salvatore (name)
