= Alexya Salvador =

Brazilian reverend and teacher

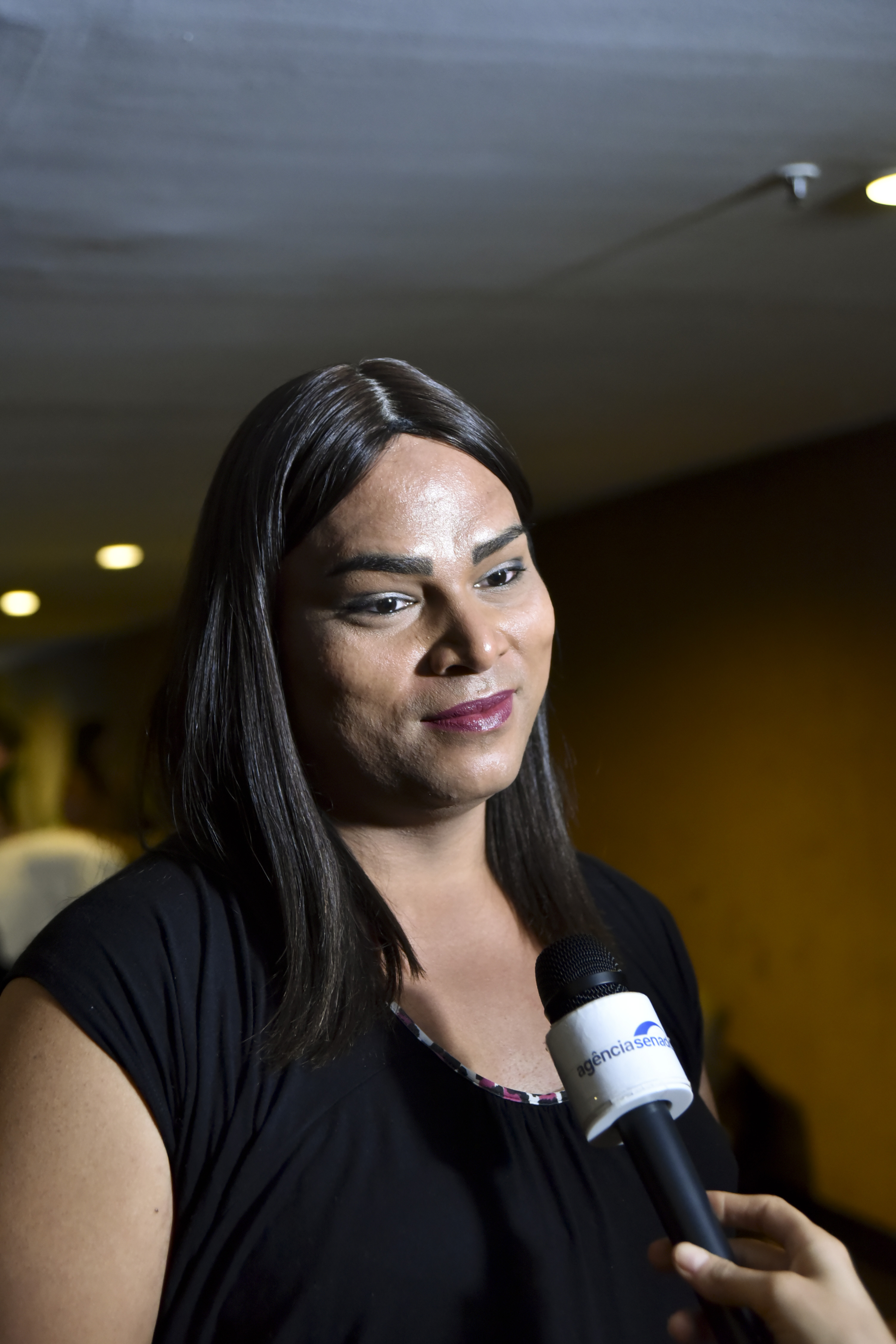
- Alexya Salvador in 2017
- Born: November 18, 1980 (age 44); Mairiporã, Brazil
- Occupation(s): Reverend, teacher

Alexya Lucas Evangelista Salvador (born 1980) is a Brazilian teacher and reverend. She was ordained in 2019, becoming the first transgender reverend in Latin America. She was additionally the first trans woman to adopt a child in Brazil.

== Personal life ==
Alexya Lucas Evangelista Salvador was born on November 18, 1980, in Mairiporã, Brazil. Her parents were Catholic but non-practicing, and at the age of seven she begged them to take her to church. She was bullied at school.

When Salvador was young, and before she realized that she was transgender, she wanted to be a priest. She joined a seminary, and enjoyed attending Canção Nova events, but was made uncomfortable by anti-LGBT rhetoric. As a result, she decided that she would not become a priest, leaving the seminary but continuing to attend church. She eventually left the Catholic Church.

A year and a half after leaving the Catholic Church, Salvador and her now-husband Roberto were looking for a way to get married. Salvador came across the Metropolitan Community Church (MCC), which had a branch in São Paulo; she and Roberto were married as gay men in a June 2010 group wedding at the MCC. They subsequently started to attend church services there as well.

At age 28, Salvador transitioned. She was initially worried that coming out to Roberto as a trans woman would end their relationship, but he supported her through her transition and they remained together.

Salvador began researching adoption in 2014, but couldn't find any stories of trans women or travestis who had adopted children. An adoption lawyer told her that she would be the first trans person to adopt a child in Brazil. In October 2015, Salvador and her husband adopted a boy with special needs after a 6-month legal process, and Salvador became the first trans woman and the first travesti to adopt a child in Brazil. The couple later adopted a transgender girl in 2016, and another in 2019. Salvador is the oldest of three siblings, and wanted to have three children.

As of August 2020, Salvador was living in Mairiporã with her husband, one son, and two daughters. She was seeking a location to open a branch of the MCC nearby.

== Career ==
Salvador began working as a public school teacher in 2004. As of August 2019, she was the vice president of the Brazilian Association of Homotransaffective Families.

In 2015, Salvador was appointed as an assistant pastor at the Metropolitan Community Church in São Paulo.

In May 2017, Salvador held a Mass in Cuba along with Cindy Bourgeois (a Canadian trans pastor) and Allyson Robinson. Reuters reported that it was the first Eucharist led by a trans pastor in Cuban history. At the service, Salvador said that "God's love is radically inclusive."

In 2018, Salvador campaigned to be a state representative for São Paulo with the Socialism and Liberty Party on a platform of support for LGBT rights, education, and adoption.

In 2019, Salvador was officially ordained, becoming the first transgender reverend in Latin America.

== Recognition ==
In June 2021, a documentary film titled Deus é Mulher ("God is a Woman") was scheduled to appear at a Docs in Progress event during the 2021 Cannes Film Festival. The film, written and directed by Bárbara Cunha, explores the life and trajectory of Alexya Salvador.
