= Pappalardi =

Pappalardi is a southern Italian surname, a patronymic form of Pappalardo. Notable people with the surname include:

- Felix Pappalardi (1939–1983), American music producer, songwriter, vocalist, and bassist
- Gail Collins Pappalardi (1941–2013), American songwriter, producer, and artist
