= Sal (name) =

Sal is a given name and nickname, the latter often of Salvatore, Salvador, or Salomon.

== Artists and entertainers ==
- Sal Abruscato (born 1970), American drummer
- Sal Buscema (1936–2026), American comic book artist
- Sal Governale (born 1968), American comedian, radio personality, pizzeria expert, stockbroker, member of The Howard Stern Show
- Sal Iacono (born 1971), American comedian
- Sal Mineo (1939–1976), American actor
- Sal Nistico (1938–1991), American jazz tenor saxophonist
- Sal Randolph (born 1959), American artist and theorist
- Sal Salvador (1925–1999), American bebop jazz guitarist and music educator
- Sal Solo (born 1961), English singer born Christopher Scott Stevens
- Sal Stowers (born 1986), American actress and model
- Sal Valentino (born 1942), American rock musician, singer and songwriter, lead singer of The Beau Brummels
- Sal Viscuso (born 1948), American actor
- Sal Vulcano (born 1976), American comedian, television star, and member of The Tenderloins

== Athletes ==
- Sal Barbier (born 1969), American skateboarder and footwear designer
- Sal Bando (1944–2023), American baseball player
- Sal Bartolo (1917–2002), American boxer and former WBA featherweight champion
- Sal Bernal (born 1992), Mexican soccer player
- Sal Fasano (born 1971), American baseball catcher
- Sal Maglie (1917–1992), American baseball pitcher
- Sal Olivas (born c. 1946), American college football player
- Sal Rinauro (born 1982), American professional wrestler
- Sal Sunseri (born 1959), American football coach
- Sal Wormley (born 2001), American football player
- Sal Zizzo Jr. (born 1987), American soccer player

== Politicians ==
- Sal Brinton (born 1955), British politician, President of the Liberal Democrats
- Sal Cannella (born 1943), American politician
- Sal DiDomenico, American politician, member of the Massachusetts Senate since 2010
- Salvatore DiMasi (born 1945), American politician convicted of corruption
- Sal Esquivel (born 1948), American politician
- Sal Santoro (born 1951), American politician

== Other ==
- Sal Castro (1933–2013), Mexican-American educator and activist
- Sal Khan (born 1976), American teacher and entrepreneur
- Sal Restivo (born 1940), sociologist/anthropologist
- Wassim Slaiby (born 1979), Lebanese-Canadian record executive, talent manager, entrepreneur and philanthropist, better known by his nickname "Sal"

== Fictional characters ==
- An alias of Big Pussy Bonpensiero, on the television series The Sopranos
- Salvatore Sal Maroni, a DC Comics enemy of Batman
- Aunt Sal, on the British soap opera EastEnders, played by South African-British Actress Anna Karen
- Sal Manella, a film director from Phoenix Wright: Ace Attorney
- Sal Minella, a Muppet chimpanzee
- Salvatore Tessio, in the novel The Godfather and the film adaptation and the sequel, The Godfather Part II
- Sal, an animated Futurama character
- SAL 9000, a fictional computer in 2010: Odyssey Two
- Sal Paradise, the protagonist of Jack Kerouac's 1958 novel On The Road
- Sal Mustela, optional crew member in Need For Speed Carbon
- Sal Fisher, video game protagonist from Steve Gabry's Sally Face
- Salvatore “Sal” Hunter, a main protagonist from the Nickelodeon TV show Hunter Street
