= Volpato =

Volpato is an Italian surname. Notable people with the surname include:

- Cadão Volpato (born 1956), Brazilian musician, artist, journalist and writer
- Cristian Volpato (born 2003), Australian-Italian footballer
- Giovanna Volpato (born 1975), Italian runner
- Giovanni Volpato (1735–1803), Italian engraver
- Paola Volpato (born 1969), Chilean actress
- Regina Volpato (born 1968), Brazilian journalist, writer and television presenter
- Rej Volpato (born 1986), Italian footballer
- Roberto Volpato (born 1979), Brazilian professional footballer

== See also ==
- Volpati, surname
