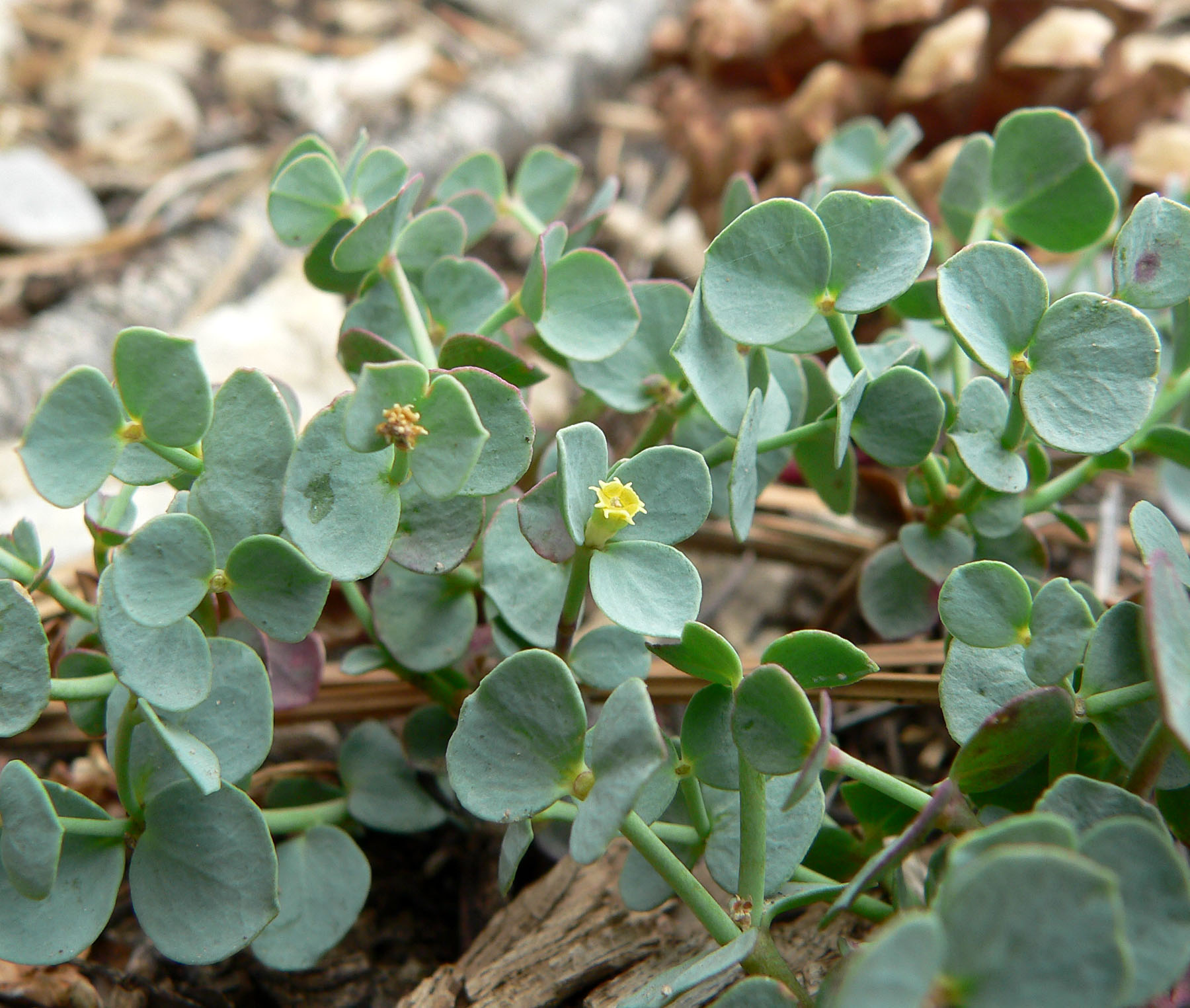

Conservation status
- Secure (NatureServe)

Scientific classification
- Kingdom: Plantae
- Clade: Embryophytes
- Clade: Tracheophytes
- Clade: Spermatophytes
- Clade: Angiosperms
- Clade: Eudicots
- Clade: Rosids
- Order: Malpighiales
- Family: Euphorbiaceae
- Genus: Euphorbia
- Species: E. brachycera

Binomial name
- Euphorbia brachycera Engelm. (1858)

Subspecies
- List: Euphorbia brachycera f. dichotoma (Daniels) Oudejans; Euphorbia brachycera var. robusta (Engelm.) Dorn; Euphorbia Montana Engelm.; Euphorbia Montana var. robusta Engelm.; Euphorbia Montana var. trifaris Norton; Euphorbia odontadenia Boiss.; Euphorbia philora (Cockerell) Tidestr.; Euphorbia robusta (Engelm.) Small; Euphorbia robusta var. interioris Norton; Galarhoeus robustus (Engelm.) Rydb.; Tithymalus brachycerus (Engelm.) Small; Tithymalus fendleri Klotzsch & Garcke; Tithymalus philorus Cockerell; Tithymalus philorus f. dichotomus Daniels; Tithymalus robustus (Engelm.) Small

= Euphorbia brachycera =

Species of flowering plant

Euphorbia brachycera is a species of flowering plant in the Euphorbiaceae family. It is referred to by the common name horned spurge and is native to Northern Mexico and the Rocky Mountains of the US. It is a rhizomatous herbaceous perennial growing in spreading mats, with narrow green leaves and yellow flowerheads. It can grow up to 2 feet (61 centimetres) tall. Some of its habitats include canyons, sandy or gravelly slopes, pine-oak woodlands, and mixed coniferous forest.
