= Lucio Salvatore =

Brazilian artist (born 1975)

Lucio Salvatore (born 3 May 1975) is an Italian-born multidisciplinary Brazilian artist who works with sculpture, photography, text, painting, performance and appropriation of processes. Salvatore lives and works in Rio de Janeiro and in Sant’Elia Fiumerapido, Italy. Salvatore’s artworks are situations created with heterogeneous elements, processes and people that work together in experimental form. His work is seen as a critique of both centralized and decentralized powers and its abuses, social control and consumerism in its broadest declination, especially cultural.

Salvatore is known for his body of work 'Some Other Race', a unique series of conceptual artworks created with human blood that opens new perspectives on the way the nature of the work of art can be thought. Through parodies of scientific methods of classifications and categorizations, Salvatore looks at the common elements that precede rigid definitions of people's identities, the indiscernible nature of the fluid from where any difference comes from, as the artist declares in his interview with Brazilian journalist Jo Soares in 2010.

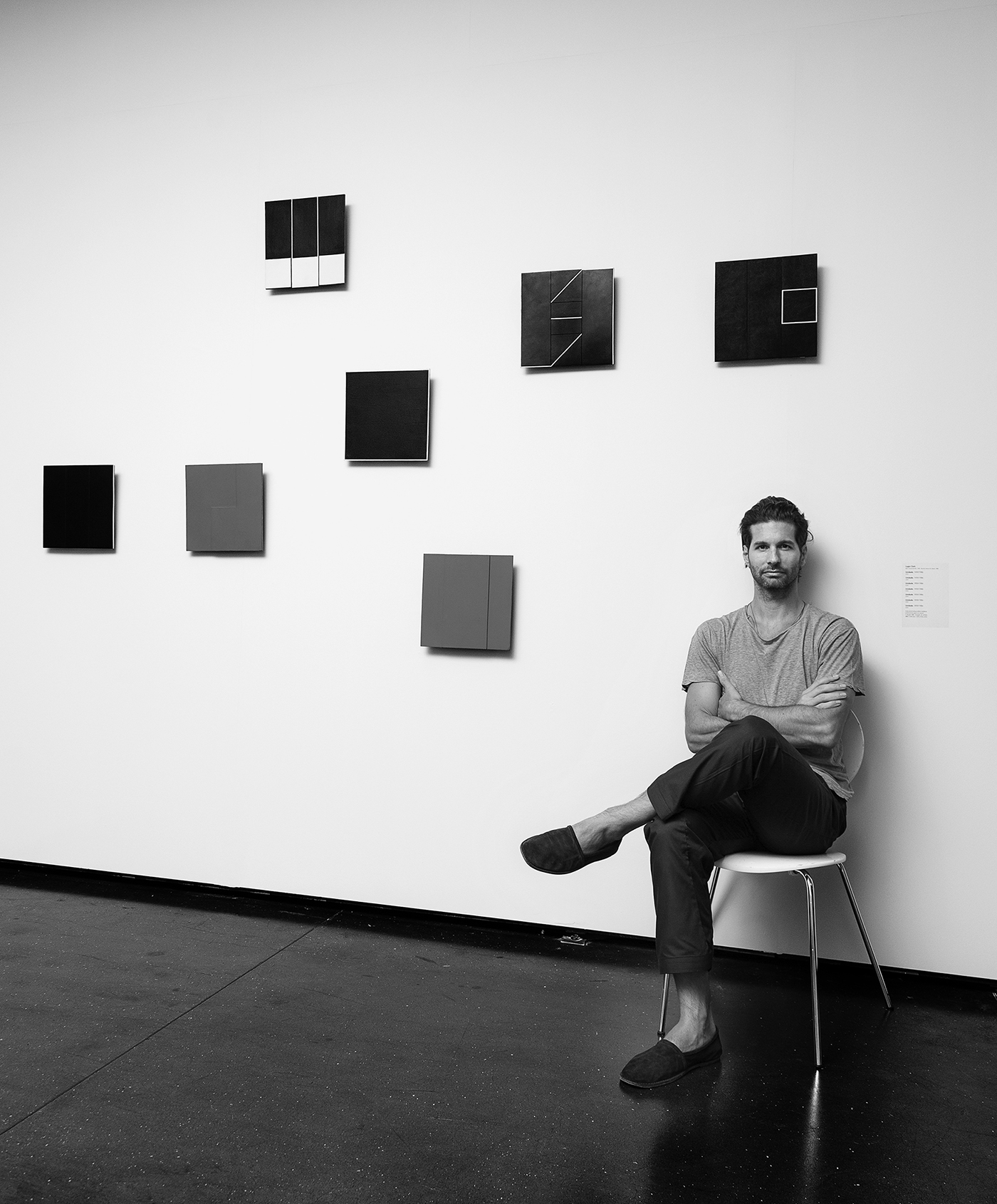
Lucio Salvatore, Metaelmenti, MAM Rio de Janeiro (2018)

== Biography ==
Salvatore was born in Cassino where he attended the Liceo Classico ‘G. Carducci’. He graduated in economics from Bocconi University in Milan (March 1998). During this time, he also attended philosophy courses at the University of Milan. He studied photography in New York City where he lived from 2002 to 2010 and fine arts at Escola de Artes Visuais Parque Lage in Rio de Janeiro, where Salvatore developed his roots as an artist.

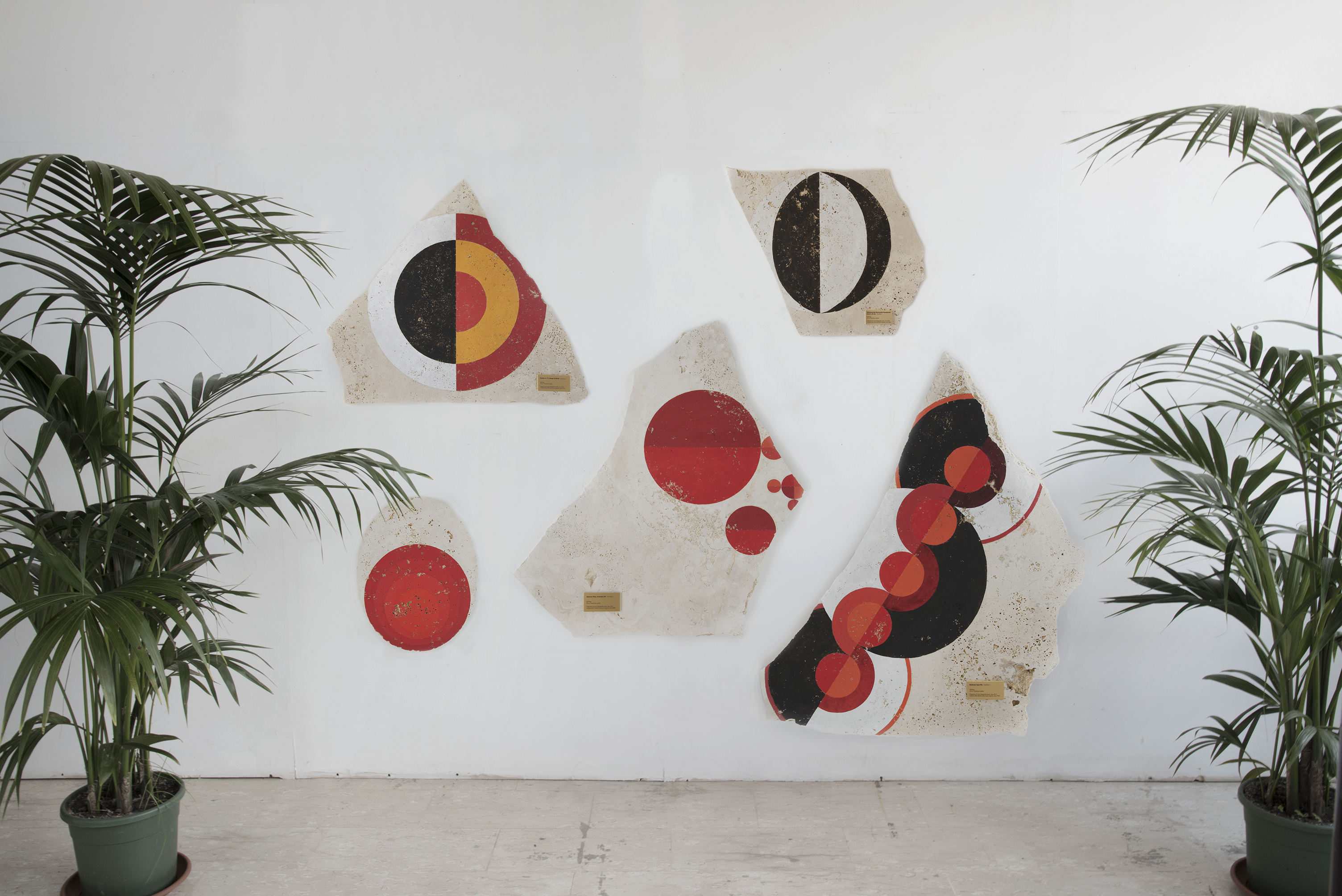
Lucio Salvatore, Lineage (2008-2019)

== Exhibitions ==
- Museum of Modern Art, Rio de Janeiro, Brazil, Lucio Salvatore | Metaelementi (2017-2018)

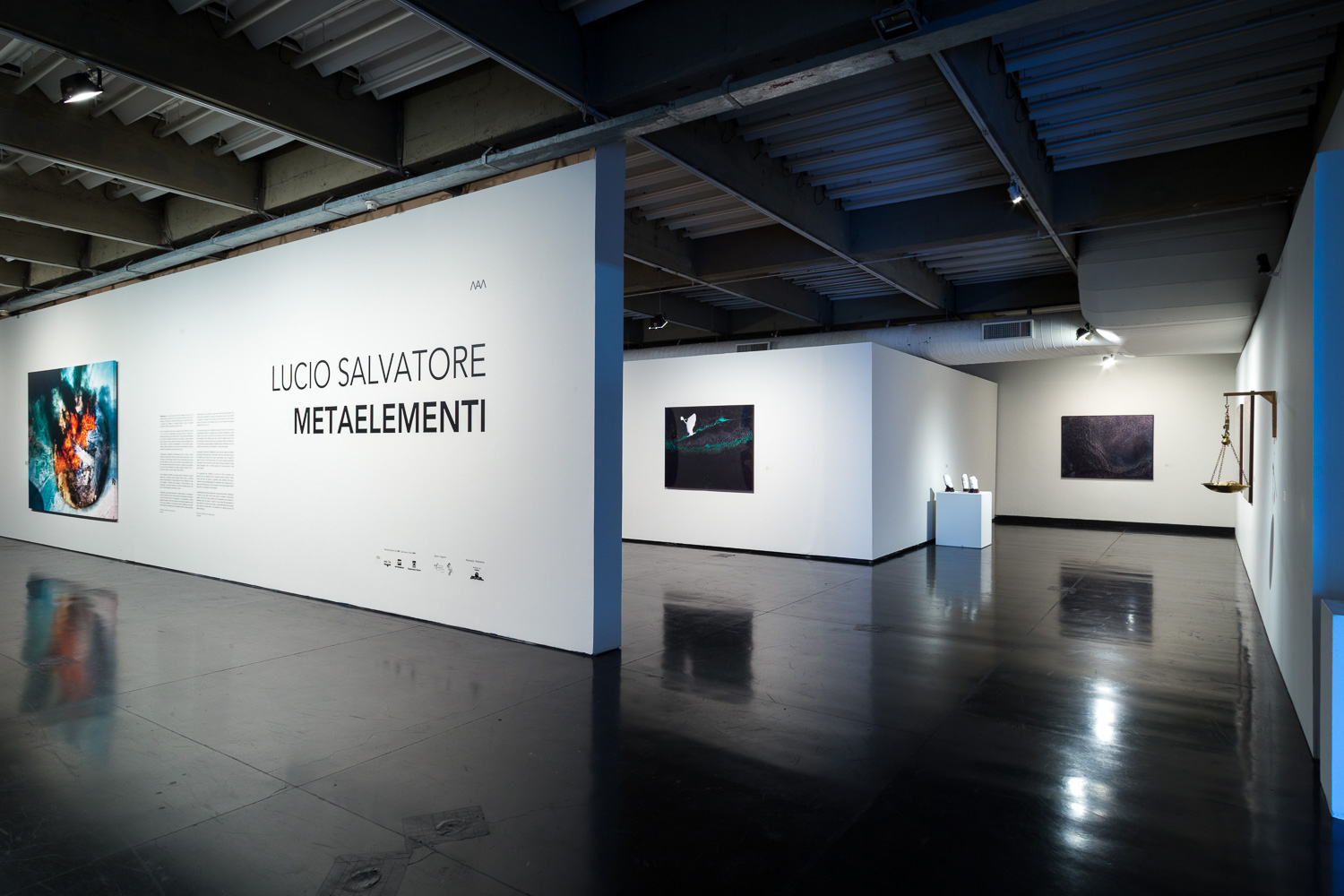
Lucio Salvatore, Metalementi (2017-2018), Museu de Arte Moderna, MAM, Rio de Janeiro

- Martha Pagy Gallery, Rio de Janeiro, Brazil, Lucio Salvatore | Controvalori (2018)

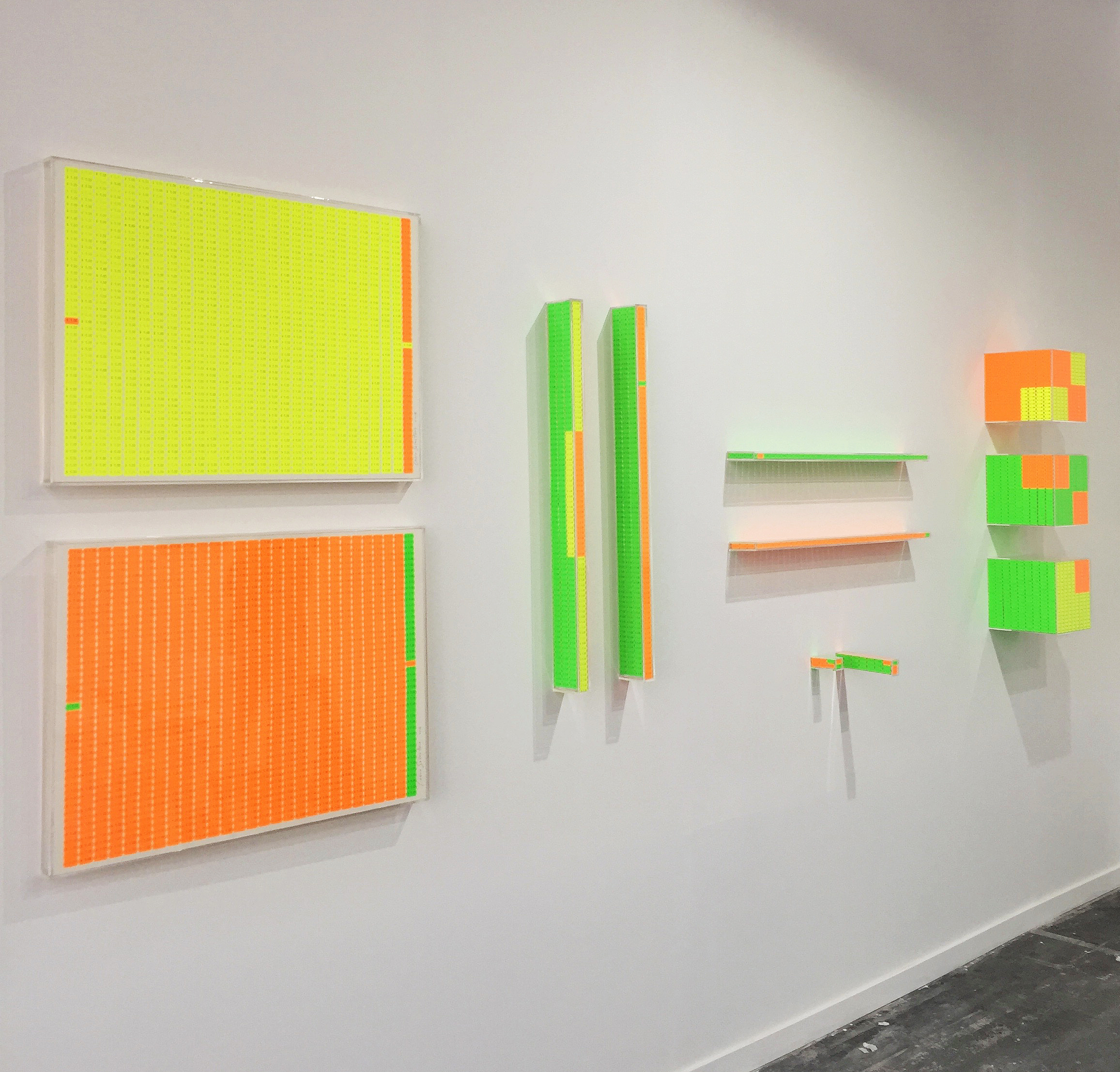
Lucio Salvatore, Valori Attivi (2018), Martha Pagy gallery, Rio de Janeiro

- Palazzo Pamphilj, Galleria Cortona and Galleria Candido Portinari, Roma, Italy, Lucio Salvatore | Parque Lage (2017)

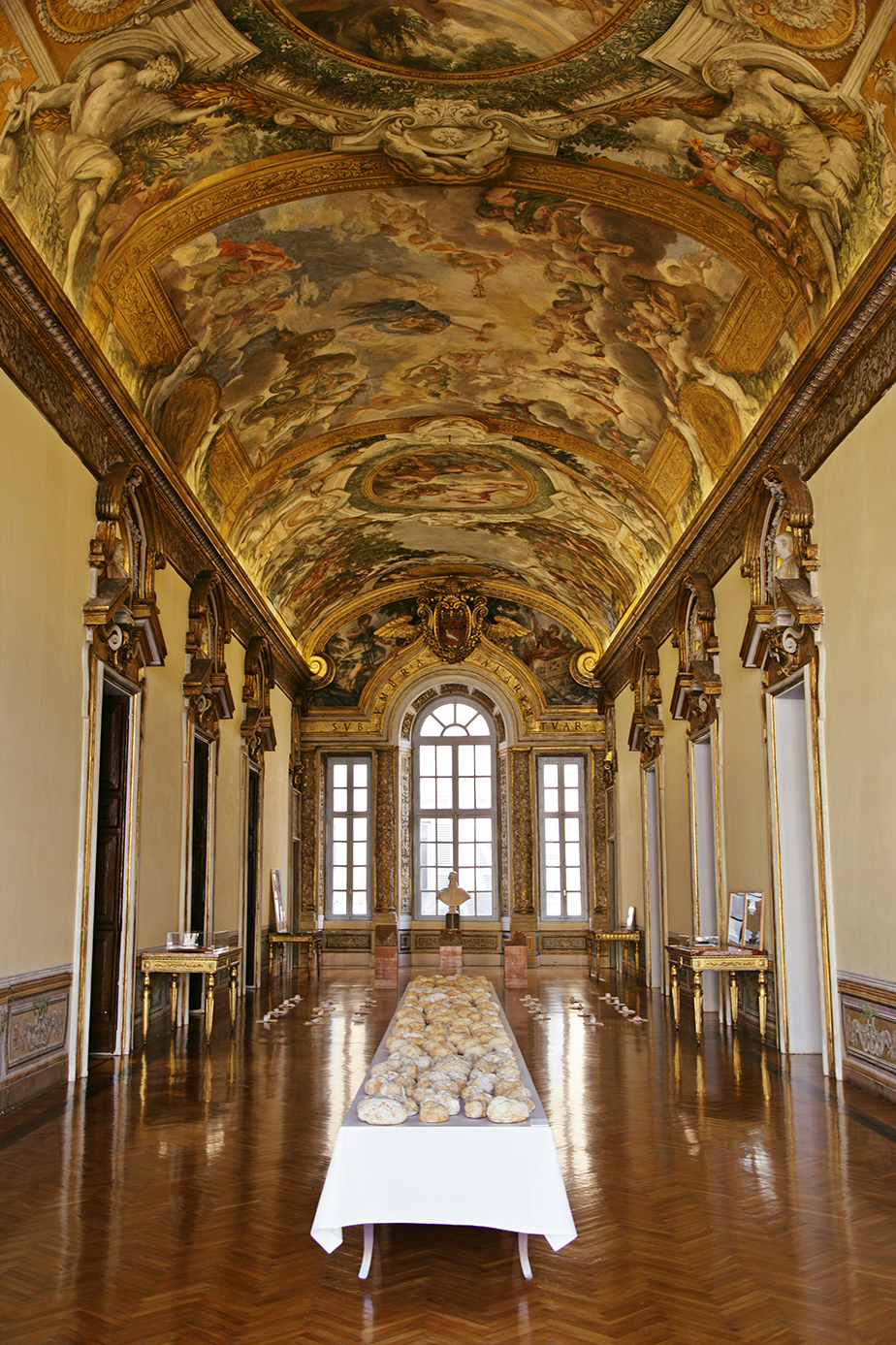
Lucio Salvatore, Parque Lage (2018), Palazzo Pamphilj, Roma

- Centro Cultural Correios, Rio de Janeiro, Brazil, Lucio Salvatore | Arte Capital (2016)
- Centro Cultural Correios, Rio de Janeiro, Brazil, Lucio Salvatore | Fragmento (2015)
- Centro Cultural Correios, Rio de Janeiro, Brazil, Lucio Salvatore | Redução Espacial (2014)
- Museu Brasileiro da Escultura, São Paulo, Brazil, Lucio Salvatore | Blood (2011)
- Openhouse Gallery, New York, USA, Lucio Salvatore | Studio (2009)
- Superstudio, Milano, Italy, Lucio Salvatore | Untitled (2008)
- Jardim Botânico, Rio de Janeiro, Brazil, Lucio Salvatore | Untitled (2008)
