= El Salvador (caldera) =

Caldera in Chile

Coordinates: 26°17′30″S 69°32′30″W

El Salvador is a caldera in Chile.

The mountains La Antena and Contreras form the southeastern margin of the caldera, while the 3,350 metres (10,990 ft) high Cerro Indio Muerto massif lies inside the caldera.

The terrain around the caldera is formed by a Paleozoic basement, Mesozoic sedimentary rocks and also Mesozoic volcanic rocks; the latter are separated from the first two units by branches of the Domeyko fault system; this fault system and its branches have controlled the emplacement of a large number of copper deposits. Later sequences include the Miocene Atacama gravels and Quaternary alluvium.

The Paleocene volcanism is characterized by trachyandesite and trachybasalt, which define a potassium-rich calc-alkaline suite. Phenocrysts include biotite, clinopyroxene and olivine. Eocene rocks are also calc-alkaline, but they contain less potassium and contain phenocrysts of biotite and hornblende.

El Salvador during the Paleocene collapsed and erupted the Cerros Contreras-La Antena ignimbrites. Later the Indio Muerto lava dome complex was emplaced in the northeastern part of the caldera, while a lava-ignimbrite sequence known as the Los Amarillos-Kilómetro Catorce developed in the eastern part of the caldera. The history of the volcanic complex was at first considered to be continuous, but later it was found that it involved a Paleocene and an Eocene phase, with caldera formation occurring about 63-61 million years ago. The Eocene volcanic episode appears to be unrelated to the Paleocene one and gave rise to ore deposits.
