= Concepción del Oro Municipality =

Municipality in the Mexican state of Zacatecas

Municipality of Concepción del Oro
- Municipality
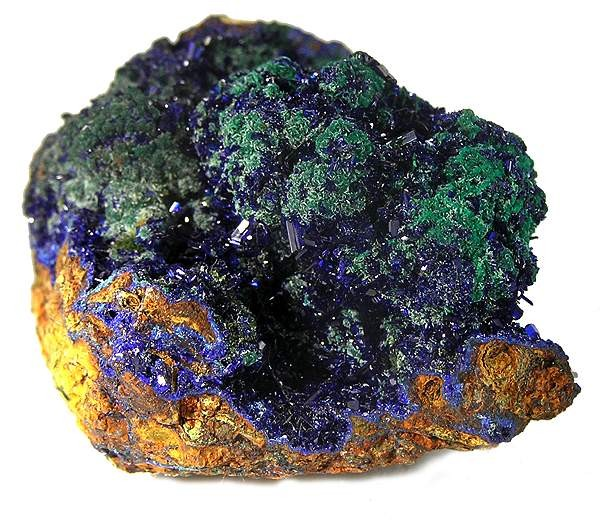
- Azurite and Malachite, from Concepción del Oro, 5.2 × 4.4 × 3.2 cm

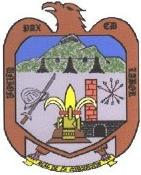
- Coat of arms

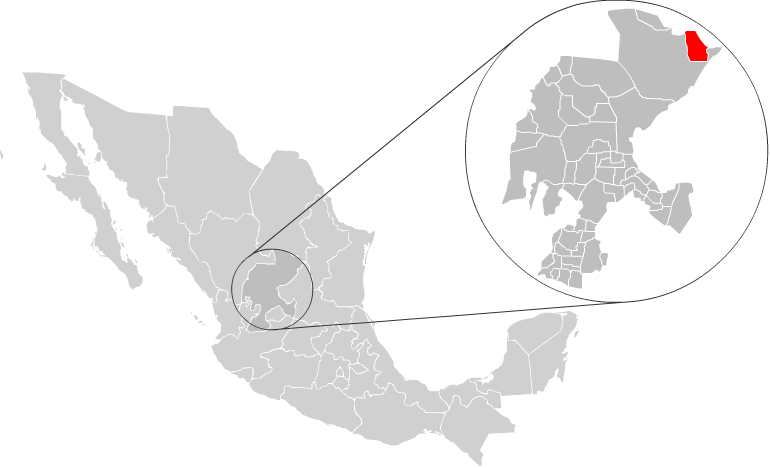
- Location of Concepción del Oro within Zacatecas and Mexico
- Coordinates: 24°42′N 101°25′W
- Country: Mexico
- State: Zacatecas
- Municipal seat: Concepción del Oro
- Largest city: Concepción del Oro
- Founded: 1587
- Municipality: 1857

Government
  - Municipal President: J. Jesús Martínez Horta PRI

Area
  - Total: 2,559 km^{2} (988 sq mi)
- Elevation: 2,070 m (6,790 ft)

Population (2005)
  - Total: 11,857
  - Seat: 6,653
- Time zone: UTC-6 (Central (US Central))
- Postal Code: 98200, 98204, 98205, 98209-98212
- Area code: 842
- Website: Concepciondeloro

Concepción del Oro is one of the 58 municipalities in the Mexican state of Zacatecas. It is located in the northern part of the state and is bounded by the municipalities of Mazapil and El Salvador; it also lies next to the states of Coahuila and San Luis Potosí. The municipality covers a total surface area of 2,559 square kilometers (988 sq mi).

== Population ==
In the 2005 census Concepción del Oro reported a population of 11,857. Of these, 6,653 lived in the municipal seat and the remainder in surrounding rural communities.

== Geography ==
Concepción del Oro is located in the northern part of the state and it is bounded by the municipalities of Mazapil and El Salvador; it also lies next to the states of Coahuila and San Luis Potosí. The municipality covers a total surface area of 2,559 square kilometers (988 sq mi).

=== Climate ===
Climate data for Concepción del Oro (1951–2010)
Month	Jan	Feb	Mar	Apr	May	Jun	Jul	Aug	Sep	Oct	Nov	Dec	Year
Record high °C (°F)	29.5 (85.1)	30.0 (86.0)	32.0 (89.6)	36.0 (96.8)	39.5 (103.1)	35.5 (95.9)	34.0 (93.2)	32.5 (90.5)	32.0 (89.6)	37.0 (98.6)	29.0 (84.2)	29.5 (85.1)	39.5 (103.1)
Mean daily maximum °C (°F)	18.0 (64.4)	20.1 (68.2)	23.3 (73.9)	26.3 (79.3)	28.1 (82.6)	28.6 (83.5)	27.4 (81.3)	27.3 (81.1)	25.9 (78.6)	23.8 (74.8)	21.7 (71.1)	18.8 (65.8)	24.1 (75.4)
Daily mean °C (°F)	10.8 (51.4)	12.6 (54.7)	15.2 (59.4)	18.3 (64.9)	20.3 (68.5)	21.3 (70.3)	20.7 (69.3)	20.5 (68.9)	19.1 (66.4)	16.7 (62.1)	14.2 (57.6)	11.8 (53.2)	16.8 (62.2)
Mean daily minimum °C (°F)	3.7 (38.7)	5.1 (41.2)	7.1 (44.8)	10.4 (50.7)	12.6 (54.7)	14.0 (57.2)	13.9 (57.0)	13.6 (56.5)	12.4 (54.3)	9.5 (49.1)	6.6 (43.9)	4.8 (40.6)	9.5 (49.1)
Record low °C (°F)	−7.5 (18.5)	−6.0 (21.2)	−5.0 (23.0)	0.0 (32.0)	6.0 (42.8)	7.0 (44.6)	7.0 (44.6)	7.0 (44.6)	3.5 (38.3)	−0.5 (31.1)	−3.5 (25.7)	−11.0 (12.2)	−11.0 (12.2)
Average precipitation mm (inches)	26.9 (1.06)	13.6 (0.54)	12.4 (0.49)	20.8 (0.82)	34.7 (1.37)	51.6 (2.03)	77.0 (3.03)	61.3 (2.41)	59.4 (2.34)	34.6 (1.36)	17.6 (0.69)	24.8 (0.98)	434.7 (17.11)
Average precipitation days (≥ 0.1 mm)	3.4	2.5	2.0	3.4	6.1	7.5	9.9	8.5	8.6	5.3	2.6	3.9	63.7
Source: Servicio Meteorologico Nacional

== Economy ==
Agriculture is one of the main economical activities in Concepción del Oro, it is based in temporary harvesting of mainly: beans, maize, oats, barley and wheat.
