= Elisa Ortiz de Aulestia =

Ecuadorian teacher and writer

Elisa Ortiz de Aulestia (1909–1991) was an Ecuadorian teacher and writer. Her ideas reflected the principles of the feminist movement in the 60's. Women's development through education is the main topic of many of her pedagogical reflections. As an active socialist, she was a member of the PSE (Partido Socialista Ecuatoriano) as she believed it to be the national revindication movement, that represented principles to fulfill Ecuadorian needs. She and her husband invested their intellectual effort, as well as their own economic resources, to change the methodology that teachers used in Ecuadorian schools. Her work is considered a milestone in the struggle to reach quality education for women.

== Life ==
Elisa Ortiz was born on September 12, 1902, in Guayaquil, Ecuador. Her parents were Ángel Jorge Ortiz Montufar and Victoria Guadalupe Garcés Salazar. She grew up in a changing time when Eloy Alfaro had begun a period of liberalism in Ecuador.

When Elisa was eight, her family had to move to Ambato due to her mother's illness. There, she studied in a private school where she was severely punished. Because of this traumatic event, she refused to attend an educational institution. She and her siblings were home-schooled. At the age of sixteen, she went back to Guayaquil to finish her education. She studied at "Normal Rita Lecumberri", being one of the most brilliant students. She got a scholarship at "Normal Manuela Cañizares" High School. On July 25, 1921, she graduated and began to work as a Spanish teacher in the same High School at the age of nineteen. In 1924, she met Alfonso Aulestia Bravo, a coworker, and they got married. Sponsored by the German Mission, he got a scholarship to study in the "Tecnische Universität Berlin" in Berlin. Back from Germany, they both implemented new methodologies to improve technical education and try to contribute to the country's development. She dedicated her life to her convictions of empowering women through education. On November 27, 1991, she died peacefully among her children at the age of 89.

== Professional ==
=== Educational field ===
- 1921: She joined the "Normal Manuela Cañizares" workforce. She would face two great obstacles during her career: the opposition to the inclusion of teachers without university degrees in public education and the fact of being a woman.
- 1923 to 1929: Elisa Ortiz worked at "24 de Mayo" High School, where she educated people on the idea of equality for women.
- 1929 to 1931: She directed "Diez de Agosto" primary school and implemented the "Escuela Activa" modality, which would instruct teachers on the Belgian Method created by the pedagogue Ovidio Decroly.
- 1932 to 1934: Elisa Ortiz was named Principal of the "Normal Manuela Cañizares" in Quito. She appended other institutions to the High School, she also appended two institutions created by herself, which would update teachers' level of knowledge.
- 1938: She planned a pedagogical and methodological reform to which many opposed. She traveled to Peru to understand its educational system, because of which she was accused of economically impairing the State treasury; she permitted the registration of two pregnant girls for their senior year and she accepted the registration of an Afro-Ecuadorian student.
- 1941: Elisa was invited by the Ann Arbor University of the State of Michigan, US, to teach Spanish and to observe the institutional structure, the academic fundamentals and the organization of that University's educational system. When she returned to Ecuador, she had been removed from her position and told that her educational services were no longer required.
- 1946 to 1963: due to the rejection experienced in her own country, she exiled herself to Chile, country that welcomed her, valued her professional competence and she was hired her as a Teacher in the Pedagogical Section of the Ministry of Education.
- 1963: she was called by the Ministry of Education of Ecuador to work as a technical advisor for the Holistic Education Planning Department.
- 1964 to 1971: She was a technical advisor for the Holistic Education Planning Department Planning until 1971 when she retired.

=== Political field ===
- 1922: She joined the "Partido Socialista Ecuatoriano"
- 1924: She presided the "Centro Feminista Luz de Pichincha". She was delegated to the "Directorio Nacional de la Confederación Obrera Ecuatoriana"
- 1926-1928: She organized and taught night courses for workers.
- 1928: She organized and celebrated a week for "Women Workers" to raise awareness of the importance of women's contributions in the different social and economic areas.
- 1945: She was part of the first Pan-American Congress of Social Service, which took place in Santiago de Chile.
- 1947 - 1951: While she was in Chile, Ambassador Benjamín Carrión asked her to be his advisor during his diplomatic mission in that country.
- 1948 to 1958: she was member of the MENCH (Movimiento Emancipador Nacional Chileno), a group of women who defended equal opportunities and rights for women; she was also a delegate of the Ecuadorian Government to the Annual Assembly of the CIM (Comisión Interamericana de Mujeres) in Santiago.
- 1954 - 1958: she was secretary at the ALA (Asociación del Libro Americano) in Santiago de Chile.

== Works ==
=== 1928 ===
Poetry Book

- "Barca Intangible"

=== 1938 ===
Booklets

- "Esquema de un ensayo educativo en el Normal de Señoritas de Quito", a guide to understanding the internal environment at "Manuela Cañizares" High School.
- "Brigada Noel del Manuela Cañizares".
- "Actividades de Educación Estética en el Kindergarten"
- "La poesía infantil, el cuento y la coreografía" for nursery teachers.

Articles: published by "El Día" newspaper:

- "Diez esquemas sobre pedagogía para jardines de infantes"
- "Organización y labor docente del jardín de infantes Mercedes Noboa"
