= El Salvador, Quito =

Ecuadorian political district

Coordinates: 0.225265°S 78.511115°W

El Salvador is an electoral parish (parroquia electorale urban) or district of Quito, the capital city of Ecuador. The parish was established as a result of the October 2004 political elections when the city was divided into 19 urban electoral parishes.
