= Salvador =

Salvador, meaning "salvation" (or "saviour") in Catalan, Spanish, and Portuguese may refer to:

- Salvador (name)

== Arts, entertainment, and media ==
=== Music ===
- Salvador (band), a Christian band that plays both English and Spanish music
  - Salvador (Salvador album), 2000
- Salvador (Ricardo Villalobos album), 2006
- Salvador (Sega Bodega album) 2020
- "Salvador", a song by Jamie T from the 2007 album Panic Prevention

=== Other uses in arts, entertainment, and media ===
- Salvador (book), a 1983 book by Joan Didion
- Salvador (character), a fictional character from the Borderlands video game series
- Salvador (1986 film), a motion picture about the Salvadoran civil war of the 1980s
- Salvador (2006 film), a Spanish film about Salvador Puig Antich
- "Salvador" (short story), a 1984 science fiction short story by Lucius Shepard
- TV Salvador, a defunct television station in Salvador, Bahia, Brazil
- Salvador, a 2026 TV series about the neo-nazi movement in Madrid

== Places ==
=== Brazil ===
- Salvador, Bahia, the capital of the State of Bahia, Brazil, the largest city with this name

=== Canada ===
- Salvador, Saskatchewan, a hamlet in Saskatchewan

=== El Salvador ===
- El Salvador, a Central American country
  - San Salvador, the capital of El Salvador

=== Philippines ===
- El Salvador, Misamis Oriental, a city in the province of Misamis Oriental
- Salvador, Lanao del Norte, a municipality in the province of Lanao del Norte
- Salvador Benedicto, Negros Occidental, a municipality in the province of Negros Occidental

=== United States ===
- Lake Salvador, a lake in the State of Louisiana, United States of America

=== Elsewhere ===
- Salvador (Madrid), a ward of San Blas-Canillejas district, Madrid, Spain
- Salvador Settlement, a community in the Falkland Islands, United Kingdom
- Tevego, previously known as Villa del Divino Salvador, a settlement in the Concepción Department, Paraguay
- El Salvador, Chile, a village in the Atacama Desert, Chile
- San Salvador, an island in the Bahamas.

== Other uses ==
- Salvador (grape), a red wine grape grown primarily in California
- Salvador (Sav), a protein kinase involved in the Hippo signaling pathway

== See also ==
- El Salvador (disambiguation)
- San Salvador (disambiguation)
- Salvator (disambiguation)
- Salvatore (disambiguation), an Italian word also meaning "saviour"
- Savior (disambiguation)
