= Salvatore Todaro =

Salvatore Todaro may refer to:

- Salvatore Todaro (mobster) (1885–1929), Italian-American mobster
- Salvatore Todaro (naval officer) (1908–1942), Italian naval officer
