= Salvatori =

Salvatori is a surname. Notable people with the surname include:

- Craig Salvatori, Australian rugby player
- Domenico Salvatori (1855-1909), Italian castrati singer
- Henry Salvatori, American geophysicist
- Ilaria Salvatori, Italian fencer
- Maristela Salvatori, Italian artist
- Michael Salvatori, American composer
- Nay Salvatori, Mexican politician
- Renato Salvatori, Italian actor
- Stefano Salvatori (1967-2017), Italian footballer

== See also ==
- Salvatori (design), an Italian natural-stone design brand
- Odontophrynus salvatori, a frog species
- Salvatore (disambiguation)
