= Docs in Progress =

American film association

Docs in Progress is a film organization based in the Washington, D.C., area which showcases and incubates works in progress by up-and-coming and established documentary filmmakers.

== History ==
Docs in Progress is a 501(c)(3) non-profit arts organization located in downtown Silver Spring, Maryland, where workshops, classes, screenings, consultations and networking events are held. It was founded in 2004 as a small-scale series of screenings of works-in-progress by Washington DC-area independent documentary filmmakers first at the Warehouse Theater and later at the George Washington University in partnership with The Documentary Center. Its signature program is focused on screening two unfinished documentaries at every workshop. Following each screening, the audience participates in an interactive feedback session with the filmmaker(s). Films have been shown by everyone from students to well-established documentary filmmakers. Workshops are open to the general public so that filmmakers can get feedback from the kind of audiences they are trying to reach.

In addition to its screenings, Docs In Progress also provides classes, workshops, fellowships, fiscal sponsorship, and other programs intended for emerging documentary filmmakers, particularly in the Washington, D.C., area. It also holds an annual film festival called Community Stories which spotlights people and places in Montgomery County, Maryland.
