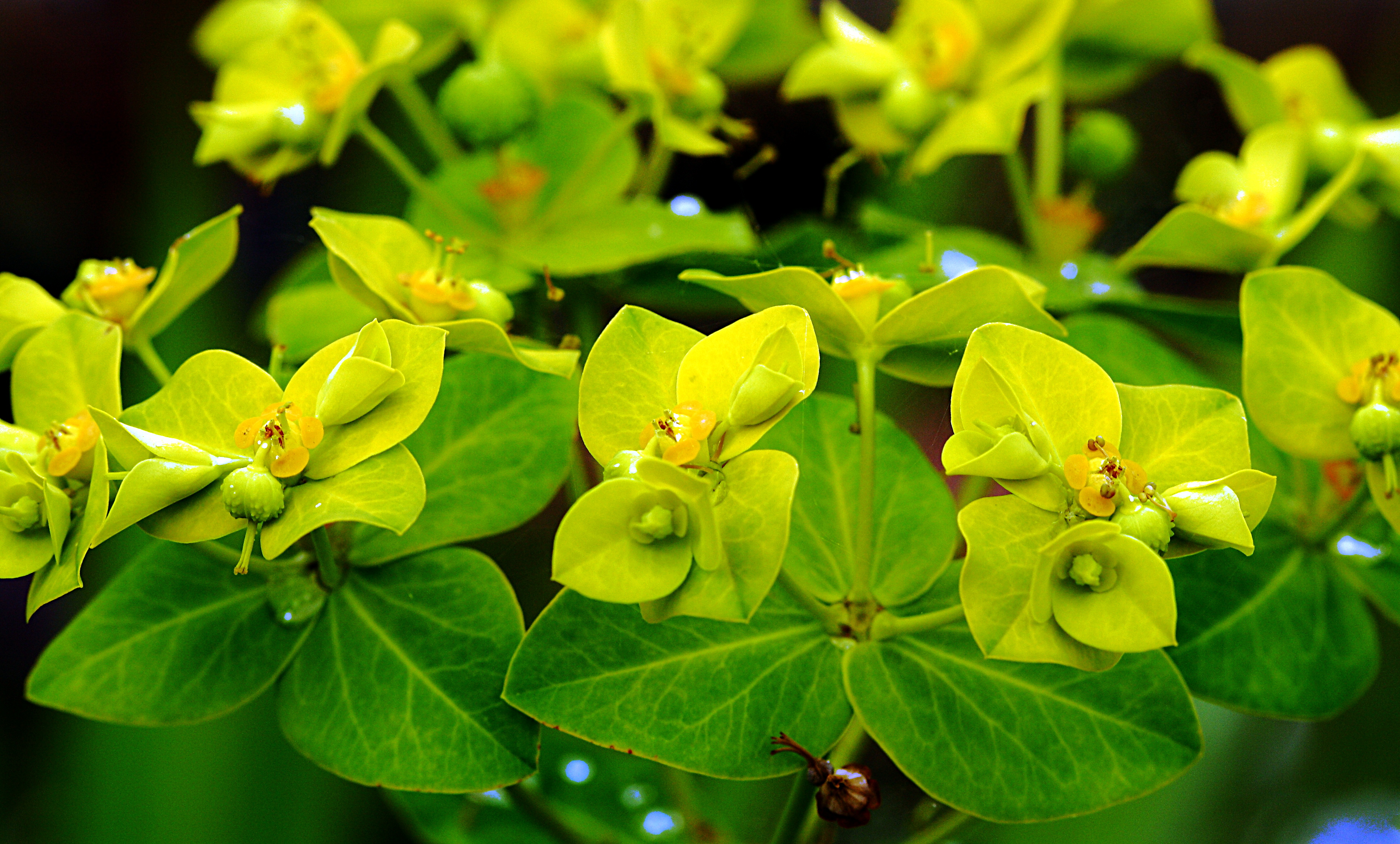

Scientific classification
- Kingdom: Plantae
- Clade: Embryophytes
- Clade: Tracheophytes
- Clade: Spermatophytes
- Clade: Angiosperms
- Clade: Eudicots
- Clade: Rosids
- Order: Malpighiales
- Family: Euphorbiaceae
- Genus: Euphorbia
- Species: E. cornigera

Binomial name
- Euphorbia cornigera Boiss.

= Euphorbia cornigera =

Species of flowering plant

Euphorbia cornigera is a species of flowering plant in the Euphorbiaceae family. It is referred to by the common name horned spurge and is native to Bhutan. It is a rhizomatous herbaceous perennial growing to 75 cm (30 in) tall, rarely 1 m (3 ft 3 in), with narrow green leaves with a pale green spine. Acid yellow flowerheads (cyathia) are borne in summer.

The Latin specific epithet cornigera means "with horns".

It has gained the Royal Horticultural Society's Award of Garden Merit.

All parts of the plant are highly toxic if ingested, and the sap may cause skin irritation.
