= Salvador Aulestia =

- Born: November 13, 1915; Barcelona, Spain
- Died: June 1994 (aged 78); Milan, Italy
- Known for: Painting, Drawing, Sculptor, Writing,
- Notable work: Sideroploide monument
- Movement: apotism, expressionism, abstractism, fauvism
- Spouse: Maria Elisa Dall'Igna (1941)
- Awards: Named Catalan Universal by the King of Spain Juan Carlos I XXXIV Venice Biennial (Personal special qualification)

Salvador Aulestia (November 13, 1915 – June 1994), was a Spanish painter, sculptor, drawer and writer born in Barcelona (Spain). Author of the Sideroploide, a 65-metre-long (213 ft) and 17-metre-high (56 ft) sculpture at the Barcelona harbor, he earned international acclaim with exhibitions in Rome (Italy) and in the United States in the fifties and sixties until Palazzo Reale in Milan (Italy) Special personal citation and pavilion at the XXXIV Venice Biennial. His artistic path goes from classical expressionism to pure abstraction through figurative and surrealist abstraction, fauvism, postcubism, expressionism, before founding, in 1963, his own personal “ism”, publishing the Apotelesmatical Art Manifesto.

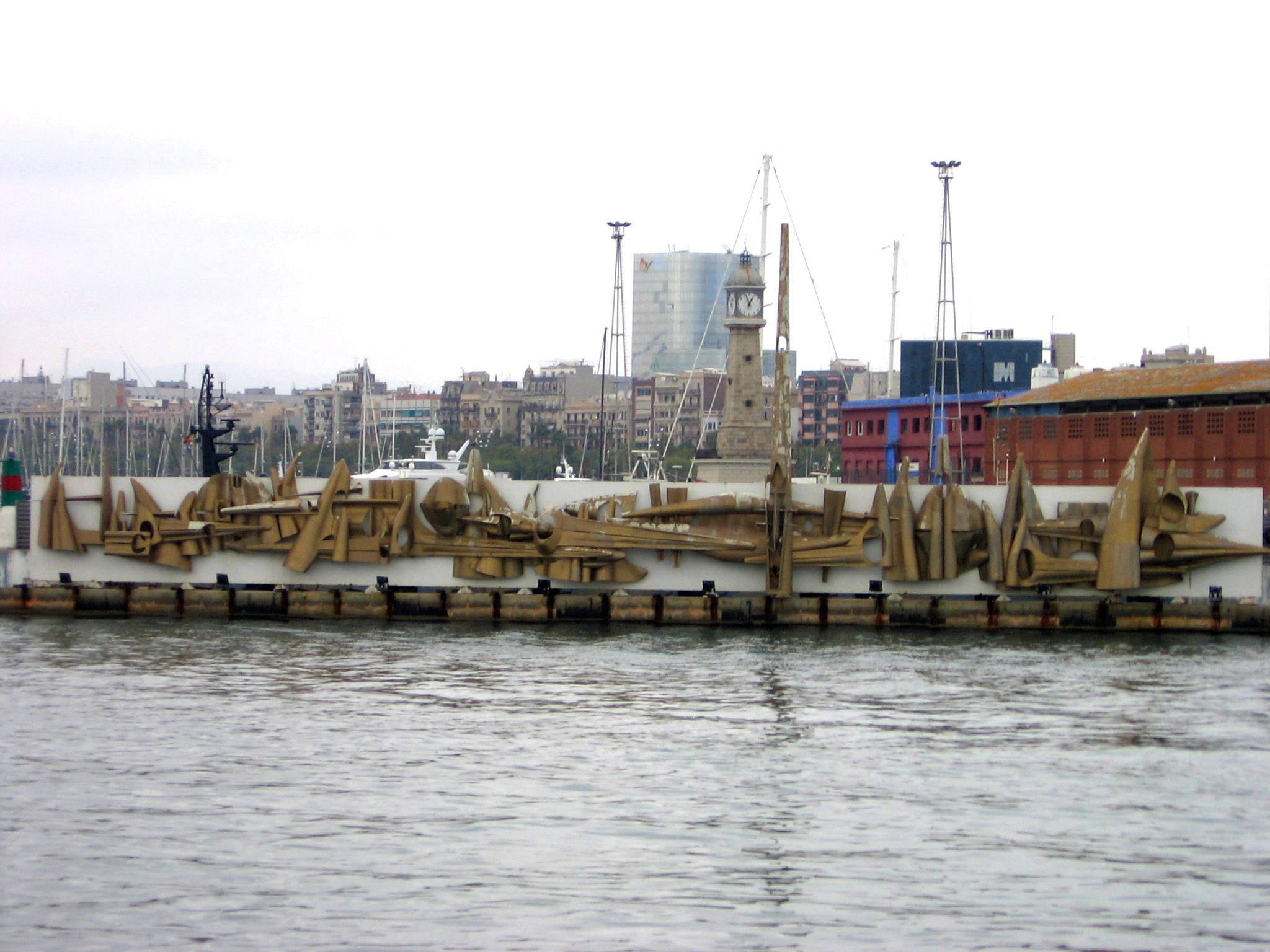
Sideroploide, Ferroestructura núm. 5, o Als homes de la mar, Salvador Aulestia

== Biography ==
Born into the families of a soldier officer, Salvador Aulestia grew up in until three years old in calle Naples y Consejo de Ciento of Barcelona, Spain. Then his family went to live in the Camp d'en Grassot (which was then the outskirts of Barcelona, now Career d'en Grassot). Already at age six the drawings are distinguished by significant clarity and synthesis for his age. At eight he began the lecture of an important private library about esotericism and magic. Later he went to live in calle Roger de Flor (Gracia). After changing several schools he was inscribed at the "Las Reales Escuelas Pias". In 1931 he entered the seminary but never leaves the artistic inspiration. In 1935, invited to a dinner, Salvador Aulestia met Garcia Lorca, of which draws a sketch that will be used later for a portrait. On July 19, 1936, began the Spanish Civil War and the seminary was closed. After being involved in various vicissitudes, participate in some battles (as tenant for the PSOE) and then prisoned, he came back to Barcelona in 1940 . He inscribed at the Escuela de Artes Y Oficios de Barcelona. He continues his artistic career with a series of exhibitions that will take him around the world. After some initial contacts in the fifties, he moved permanently to Milan (Italy) in 1972, where he produced paintings, drawings, sculptures in addition to publishing numerous books until his death in 1994. "...His work show a theurgical feeling with plastic expressionism and abstract tendency..."

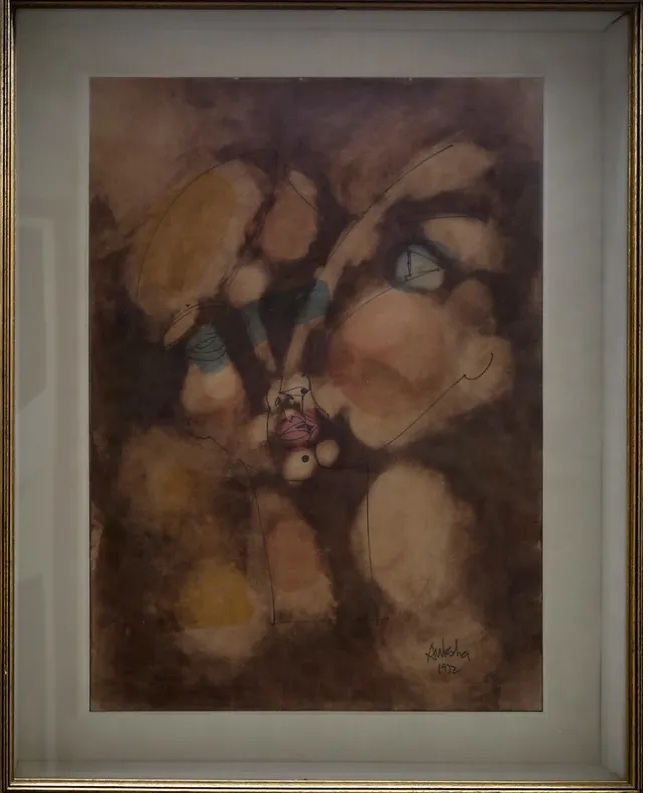
the Kiss (Casa Museo Francesco Cristina)

== Publications ==
Salvador Aulestia is author of several books:

- —— (1948). El embarcadero de las emociones (in Spanish). Barcelona: Tipografia Studium. OCLC 31140950.
- —— (1953). Tauromaquia (in Spanish). Olot: Aubert. OCLC 84609427.
- —— (1954). La mano, lenguaje desconocido; Tratado moderno de quiromancia, quiromorfologia, palmotecnia y onicología (in Spanish). Barcelona: AHR. OCLC 80080635.
- —— (1955). El enigma de su personalidad. Barcelona: AHR. OCLC 954738591.
- —— (1957). Discurso poemita sobre la fiesta de los toros. Barcelona: Dhir.
- —— (1967). La fiesta de los toros o la fiesta nacional española (1st ed.). Barcelona: Scholz. OCLC 15114331.
- —— (1975). Il Teraphim. Milan: Al Cenacolo. OCLC 800108690.
- —— (1982). La magia del calcio. Prologue by Juan Antonio Samaranch. Rome: Società Stampa Sportiva. OCLC 1045115649. – Premio Chiavari Prize for best sport book in 1982
- —— (1984). La Boxe, rito di affrontamento con i pugni sul ring. Milan: Il Dialogo.
