= Salvador Volpati =

Portuguese footballer

Personal information
- Full name: Walter Salvador Volpati
- Place of birth: Brazil
- Position: Defender

Senior career*
Years	Team	Apps	(Gls)
1971	Toronto First Portuguese		
1971	→Toronto Metros (loan)	2	(0)
- * Club domestic league appearances and goals

Salvador Volpati is a Portuguese former footballer who played as a defender.

== Career ==
Volpati played for Bragantino FC - Brazil. Also played in the National Soccer League in 1971 with Toronto First Portuguese. In July, 1971 he was loaned to the Toronto Metros of the North American Soccer League because of a player shortage due to inquires. He made two appearances for the Metros during his short stint.
