= El Salvador, Zacatecas =

El Salvador
- Municipality

- Location of El Salvador El Salvador (Mexico)
- Coordinates: 24°31′10″N 100°52′03″W
- Country: Mexico
- State: Zacatecas
- Established: 14 November 1964
- Seat: El Salvador

Government
  - Municipal president: Miguel Coronado Gómez

Area
  - Total: 623.9 km^{2} (240.9 sq mi)
- Elevation (of seat): 1,721 m (5,646 ft)

Population (2020 Census)
  - Total: 2,509
  - Density: 4.021/km^{2} (10.42/sq mi)
  - Seat: 982
- Time zone: UTC-6 (Central)
- Postal code: 98290
- Area code: 844

El Salvador is a municipality in the Mexican state of Zacatecas, located approximately 260 kilometres (160 mi) northeast of Zacatecas City, the state capital.

== Geography ==
The municipality of El Salvador lies at an elevation between 1,800 and 2,900 metres (5,900–9,500 ft) in the foothills of the Sierra Madre Oriental in northeastern Zacatecas. It borders the municipalities of Concepción del Oro in Zacatecas to the west, Saltillo in Coahuila to the north, Galeana in Nuevo León to the northeast, and Vanegas in San Luis Potosí to the southeast. The municipality covers an area of 623.9 square kilometres (240.9 sq mi) and comprises 0.8% of the state's area.

The land cover in El Salvador is mostly Meseta Central matorral (81%) with small tracts of forest (11%) and grassland (8%) also present. The municipality is situated in the Matehuala sub-basin of the Llanos el Salado.

=== Climate ===
El Salvador's climate ranges from semiarid to arid desert. Average temperatures in the municipality range between 12 and 20 °C (54–68 °F), and average annual precipitation ranges between 300 and 600 millimetres (12–24 in).

Climate data for El Salvador weather station at 24°31′15″N 100°52′18″W, 1726 m above sea level (1981–2010 averages, 1951–2010 extremes)
Month	Jan	Feb	Mar	Apr	May	Jun	Jul	Aug	Sep	Oct	Nov	Dec	Year
Record high °C (°F)	38.0 (100.4)	36.0 (96.8)	40.0 (104.0)	44.0 (111.2)	40.0 (104.0)	45.0 (113.0)	43.0 (109.4)	45.0 (113.0)	43.0 (109.4)	45.0 (113.0)	40.0 (104.0)	36.0 (96.8)	45.0 (113.0)
Mean daily maximum °C (°F)	21.0 (69.8)	23.4 (74.1)	26.1 (79.0)	29.1 (84.4)	30.7 (87.3)	29.4 (84.9)	29.8 (85.6)	29.6 (85.3)	28.5 (83.3)	27.4 (81.3)	24.3 (75.7)	21.8 (71.2)	26.8 (80.2)
Daily mean °C (°F)	11.4 (52.5)	13.3 (55.9)	15.6 (60.1)	18.7 (65.7)	20.7 (69.3)	20.8 (69.4)	21.2 (70.2)	20.9 (69.6)	19.9 (67.8)	18.0 (64.4)	14.2 (57.6)	11.6 (52.9)	17.2 (63.0)
Mean daily minimum °C (°F)	1.7 (35.1)	3.3 (37.9)	5.1 (41.2)	8.2 (46.8)	10.8 (51.4)	12.2 (54.0)	12.5 (54.5)	12.1 (53.8)	11.4 (52.5)	8.5 (47.3)	4.0 (39.2)	1.5 (34.7)	7.6 (45.7)
Record low °C (°F)	−14.0 (6.8)	−9.0 (15.8)	−9.0 (15.8)	−5.0 (23.0)	3.0 (37.4)	4.0 (39.2)	6.0 (42.8)	5.0 (41.0)	−8.0 (17.6)	−5.0 (23.0)	−8.0 (17.6)	−13.0 (8.6)	−14.0 (6.8)
Average precipitation mm (inches)	11.5 (0.45)	12.6 (0.50)	7.1 (0.28)	24.0 (0.94)	44.8 (1.76)	66.3 (2.61)	66.6 (2.62)	59.5 (2.34)	66.7 (2.63)	28.7 (1.13)	11.1 (0.44)	12.5 (0.49)	411.4 (16.20)
Average rainy days (≥ 1 mm)	1.8	1.7	1.5	2.9	6.0	7.6	7.6	8.2	7.0	3.3	1.4	1.8	50.8
Source: Servicio Meteorológico Nacional

== History ==
Cave paintings in the municipality demonstrate past occupation of the area by Irritila tribes. Colonial settlement of the area dates to the 18th century, when it was part of the Hacienda El Salado. Based in the neighbouring state of San Luis Potosí, this was one of the largest haciendas in Mexico, and was owned by Juan Bustamante, a former governor of that state. Matías Ramos Santos, who was born in El Salvador in 1891, served as Governor of Zacatecas from 1932 to 1936, and as Secretary of National Defence from 1952 to 1958.

The congregacíon of El Salvador was established in the municipality of Concepción del Oro on 14 November 1964. It became an independent municipality a week later on 21 November 1964.

== Administration ==
The municipal government of El Salvador comprises a president, a councillor (Spanish: síndico), and seven trustees (regidores), four elected by relative majority and three by proportional representation. The current president of the municipality is Miguel Coronado Gómez.

== Demographics ==
In the 2020 INEGI census, the municipality of El Salvador recorded a population of 2509 inhabitants living in 733 households. The 2010 Census recorded a population of 2710 inhabitants in El Salvador.

There are 24 inhabited localities in the municipality, of which only the municipal seat, also called El Salvador, is classified as urban. It recorded a population of 982 inhabitants in the 2020 Census.

== Economy and infrastructure ==
In the 2015 Intercensal Survey, 53% of El Salvador's workforce was employed in the primary sector, 16% in the secondary sector, 6% in commerce, and 24% in services. Agricultural activities in the municipality include cattle and goat farming.

The Kansas City Southern de México railway runs north to south through the municipality.
