= Salvator =

Salvator, original spelling of Salvador, may refer to:

- Paulaner Salvator, the original doppelbock brand
- Salvator (lizard), a genus of lizards
- Salvator (horse) (1886–1909), an American thoroughbred racehorse
- Salvator of Horta (1520–1567), a Spanish saint
- Salvator Mundi, a painting attributed to Leonardo da Vinci

== People with the given name ==
- Salvator Cicurel (1893–1975), Egyptian fencer and Jewish community leader
- Salvator Cupcea (1908–1958), Romanian physician
- Salvator Fabris (1544–1618), Italian fencing master from Padua
- Salvator Kacaj (born 1967), Albanian footballer
- Salvator Rosa (1615–1673), Italian Baroque painter, poet and printmaker
- Salvator Tongiorgi (1820–1865), Italian Jesuit philosopher and theologian

== See also ==
- Salvador (disambiguation)
- Salvator Mundi, a subject in iconography depicting Christ with his right hand raised in blessing
- Salvatore (disambiguation)
