= Salvatore =

Salvatore may refer to:

- Salvatore (name), a given name and surname, including a list of people and fictional characters with the name
- "Salvatore", a song by Lana Del Rey, on her 2015 album Honeymoon
- Salvatore (band), a Norwegian instrumental rock band
- Salvatore: Shoemaker of Dreams, a 2020 film by Luca Guadagnino
- Pizza Salvatore, a fast-food company

== See also ==
- San Salvatore (disambiguation)
- Salvatori
- Salvator (disambiguation), a Latin word meaning savior
- Salvador (disambiguation), a Catalan, Spanish, and Portuguese word meaning savior
- Salvo (disambiguation), a common diminutive of Salvatore
