= 2019–20 Adelaide United FC season =

Adelaide United
2019–20 season
- Chairman: Piet van der Pol
- Manager: Gertjan Verbeek (to 29 April 2020); Carl Veart (caretaker) (from 15 June 2020)
- Stadium: Coopers Stadium
- A-League: 7th
- FFA Cup: Winners
- Top goalscorer: League: Riley McGree (10 goals); All: Riley McGree (13 goals)
- Highest home attendance: 12,198 vs Melbourne Victory (23 November 2019)
- Lowest home attendance: 4,286 vs Newcastle Jets (15 March 2020)
- Average home league attendance: 8,183
Home colours	Away colours

The 2019–20 Adelaide United FC season was the club's 16th season since its establishment in 2003. The club participated in the A-League for the 15th time and participated in the FFA Cup for 6th time, winning the 2019 FFA Cup tournament.

On 24 March 2020, the FFA announced that the 2019–20 A-League season would be postponed until further notice due to the COVID-19 pandemic in Australia and New Zealand, and subsequently extended indefinitely. The season resumed on 17 July 2020.

== Review ==
=== Pre-season ===
Before the 2019 A-League Grand Final, Adelaide United confirmed Apostolos Stamatelopoulos had left the club and joined new A-League club, Western United on 20 March.

On 15 May, Adelaide United updated their squad with Baba Diawara, Scott Galloway, and Jordy Thomassen departing Adelaide. It was announced that Galloway had then signed for his new club, Melbourne City ahead of this current season.

Three days later, it was announced that Isaías, who had recently become an Australian citizen, departed the club. Over a month later, he joined Qatari club Al-Wakrah.

In June, Adelaide United appointed former player Bruce Djite as the Director of Football. On 5 June, Vince Lia and Lachlan Brook re-signed with the club.

On 5 July, Riley McGree signed for Adelaide United and was assigned the "number 8" shirt. In mid-July, Reds signed Curaçao international, Michaël Maria from Charlotte Independence, whilst Craig Goodwin departed the club to join Saudi Arabian club Al-Wehda.

Adelaide United played their first pre-season friendly for the season on 16 July, against North Eastern MetroStars, which resulted in a 3–1 victory. A week later, the club played an intra-club friendly, with the senior squad beating the youth side 1–0, with Nathan Konstandopoulos scoring the only goal. A week later, they beat Adelaide Raiders 5–0.

At the end of July, Adelaide United signed Norwegian striker Kristian Opseth.

On 7 August, Adelaide United travelled to Melbourne for the 2019 FFA Cup round of 32. They beat Melbourne Knights 5–2 and advanced to the next round.

In mid-August, Adelaide United played a "behind-closed-doors" friendly against Melbourne City which ended in a 1–0 loss. Jamie Maclaren scored the only goal in the 15th minute.

== Players ==
=== Squad information ===
Note: Flags indicate national team as defined under FIFA eligibility rules; some limited exceptions apply. Players may hold more than one non-FIFA nationality.

No.	Pos.	Nation	Player
2	DF	AUS	Michael Marrone
4	DF	ENG	Ryan Strain
6	MF	AUS	Stefan Mauk
7	DF	AUS	Ryan Kitto
8	MF	AUS	Riley McGree
10	MF	AUS	James Troisi
11	FW	NOR	Kristian Opseth
14	FW	AUS	George Blackwood
16	MF	AUS	Nathan Konstandopoulos
17	FW	AUS	Nikola Mileusnic
18	MF	AUS	Lachlan Brook
20	GK	AUS	Paul Izzo

No.	Pos.	Nation	Player
22	DF	DEN	Michael Jakobsen
23	DF	AUS	Jordan Elsey
24	FW	BDI	Pacifique Niyongabire (Scholarship)
26	FW	AUS	Ben Halloran
27	MF	AUS	Louis D'Arrigo
28	MF	CHN	Chen Yongbin
29	FW	AUS	Kusini Yengi (Scholarship)
35	FW	AUS	Al Hassan Toure
40	GK	AUS	Dakota Ochsenham
49	FW	AUS	Mohamed Toure (Scholarship)
70	GK	AUS	Ethan Cox (Scholarship)

== Transfers ==
=== Transfers in ===
No.	Position	Name	From	Type/fee	Contract length	Date	Ref
8	MF	Riley McGree	(Belgium) Club Brugge	>$250,000	3 years	5 July 2019	
5	DF	(Curaçao) Michaël Maria	(United States) Charlotte Independence	Undisclosed	2 years	18 July 2019	
11	FW	(Norway) Kristian Opseth	(Turkey) Erzurumspor	Free transfer	1 year	31 July 2019	
10	MF	James Troisi	Unattached	Free transfer	2 years	5 October 2019	
28	MF	(China) Chen Yongbin	(China) Qingdao Red Lions	Free transfer	1 year	15 October 2019	
6	MF	Stefan Mauk	Brisbane Roar	Free transfer	2.5 years	30 January 2020	

=== Transfers out ===
No.	Position	Player	Transferred to	Type/fee	Date	Ref
33	FW	Apostolos Stamatelopoulos	Western United	Free transfer	20 March 2019	
3	DF	Scott Galloway	Melbourne City	Free transfer	3 May 2019	
9	FW	(Senegal) Baba Diawara	Unattached	End of contract	15 May 2019	
19	FW	(Netherlands) Jordy Thomassen	(Netherlands) De Graafschap	Loan return	15 May 2019	
10	FW	(Denmark) Ken Ilsø	Unattached	End of contract	18 May 2019	
8	MF	(Spain) Isaías	(Qatar) Al-Wakrah	Undisclosed	27 May 2019	
11	MF	Craig Goodwin	(Saudi Arabia) Al-Wehda	Undisclosed	17 July 2019	
32	MF	Carlo Armiento	Unattached	Mutual contract termination	12 December 2019	
1	GK	Daniel Margush	Unattached	Mutual contract termination	13 January 2020	
6	MF	Vince Lia	Unattached	Mutual contract termination	18 January 2020	
5	DF	(Curaçao) Michaël Maria	Unattached	Mutual contract termination	18 June 2020	
30	GK	Isaac Richards	Unattached	Mutual contract termination	6 July 2020	
31	MF	(Germany) Mirko Boland	(Germany) VfB Lübeck	End of contract	8 July 2020	

=== From youth squad ===
N	Pos.	Nat.	Name	Age	Notes
29	FW	(Australia)	Kusini Yengi	20	scholarship contract
35	FW	(Australia)	Al Hassan Toure	19	2 year scholarship contract, followed by 1 year senior contract
49	FW	(Australia)	Mohamed Toure	15	3 year scholarship contract
70	GK	(Australia)	Ethan Cox	16	3 year scholarship contract
40	GK	(Australia)	Dakota Ochsenham	20	1 year senior contract

=== Contract extensions ===
No.	Name	Position	Duration	Date	Notes
6	Vince Lia	Central midfielder	1 year	5 June 2019	
18	Lachlan Brook	Forward	2 years	5 June 2019	
7	Ryan Kitto	Winger	2 years	31 October 2019	
20	Paul Izzo	Goalkeeper	2 years	1 November 2019	
27	Louis D'Arrigo	Midfielder	3 years	6 December 2019	
35	Al Hassan Toure	Striker	3 years	6 December 2019	
2	Michael Marrone	Defender	1 year	15 January 2020	
26	Ben Halloran	Winger	2 years	4 March 2020	
16	Nathan Konstandopoulos	Central midfielder	1 year	5 March 2020	
4	(England) Ryan Strain	Right-back	2 years	10 March 2020	

== Technical staff ==
Position	Staff
Head coach	(Australia) Carl Veart (caretaker)
Assistant coach	(Brazil) Airton Andrioli
Goalkeeper coach	(Australia) Eugene Galekovic
Director of football	(Australia) Bruce Djite

== Pre-season and friendlies ==
Win Draw Loss

16 July 2019	Adelaide United (Australia)	3–1	(Australia) North Eastern MetroStars	Adelaide, Australia
19:00 ACST	Alberg 31'; Blackwood 75' (pen.); Yengi 87'	Report	Barr 67'	Stadium: Taperoo Reserve; Referee: Daniel Elder

23 July 2019	Adelaide United (Australia)	1–0	(Australia) Adelaide United Youth	Adelaide, Australia
	N. Konstandopoulos	Report		Stadium: Coopers Stadium; Attendance: 0 (behind closed doors)

30 July 2019	Adelaide United (Australia)	5–0	(Australia) Adelaide Raiders	Adelaide, Australia
	Jakobsen 19'; Marrone 71'; Niyongabire 78'; McGree 79'; Mileusnic 86'	Report		Stadium: Taperoo Reserve

14 August 2019	Adelaide United (Australia)	0–1	(Australia) Melbourne City	Adelaide, Australia
		Report	Maclaren 15'	Stadium: Coopers Stadium; Attendance: 0 (behind closed doors)

27 August 2019	Adelaide United (Australia)	6–0	(Australia) Adelaide City	Adelaide, Australia
19:00 ACST	Maria 11'; McGree 16' (pen.); Halloran 32'; Stephens 73' (o.g.); D'Arrigo 75'; Mileusnic 78'	Report		Stadium: Taperoo Reserve

21 September 2019	Western United (Australia)	0–0	(Australia) Adelaide United	Ballarat, Australia
15:00 AEST		Report		Stadium: Morshead Park

24 September 2019	Melbourne City (Australia)	1–2	(Australia) Adelaide United	Melbourne, Australia
	Maclaren 54'	Report	A. Toure 14'; Elsey 67'	Stadium: City Football Academy; Attendance: 0 (behind closed doors)

24 September 2019	Melbourne City (Australia)	5–3	(Australia) Adelaide United	Melbourne, Australia
	Najjar ?', ?'; Genreau ?'; Wales ?'; Atkinson ?'	Report (Melbourne City); Report (Adelaide United)	Opseth ?', ?'; King ?'	Stadium: City Football Academy; Attendance: 0 (behind closed doors)

5 February 2020 SA Bushfire Relief Fundraiser	Football SA All-Stars (Australia)	1–4	(Australia) Adelaide United	Adelaide, Australia
19:20 ACST	Matsumoto 32'	Report	Marrone 33'; M. Toure 70', 72'; Gomulka 90+3'	Stadium: Marden Sports Complex

== Competitions ==
Win Draw Loss

=== Overview ===
Competition	First match	Last match	Starting round	Final position	Record							
Competition	First match	Last match	Starting round	Final position	Pld	W	D	L	GF	GA	GD	Win %
A-League	11 October 2019	11 August 2020	Matchday 1	7th	26	11	3	12	44	49	−5	42.31
FFA Cup	7 August 2019	23 October 2019	Round of 32	Winners	5	5	0	0	15	5	+10	100.00
Total					31	16	3	12	59	54	+5	51.61

Source: Soccerway

=== A-League ===
==== League table ====
Pos	Team	Pld	W	D	L	GF	GA	GD	Pts	Qualification
1	Sydney FC (C)	26	16	5	5	49	25	+24	53	Qualification for 2021 AFC Champions League group stage and Finals series (Note: All Australian teams withdrew from the 2021 AFC Champions League on 4 June 2021.) (Note: The top two teams enter the Finals series at the semi-finals, while the teams ranked third to sixth enter the Finals series at the elimination-finals.)
2	Melbourne City	26	14	5	7	49	37	+12	47	Qualification for 2021 AFC Champions League qualifying play-offs and Finals series
3	Wellington Phoenix (Note: Wellington Phoenix cannot qualify for the 2021 AFC Champions League as they are not recognised as an AFC club.)	26	12	5	9	38	33	+5	41	Qualification for Finals series
4	Brisbane Roar	26	11	7	8	29	28	+1	40	Qualification for 2021 AFC Champions League qualifying play-offs and Finals series
5	Western United	26	12	3	11	46	37	+9	39	Qualification for Finals series
6	Perth Glory	26	10	7	9	43	36	+7	37	Qualification for Finals series
7	Adelaide United	26	11	3	12	44	49	−5	36	
8	Newcastle Jets	26	9	7	10	32	40	−8	34	
9	Western Sydney Wanderers	26	9	6	11	35	40	−5	33	
10	Melbourne Victory	26	6	5	15	33	44	−11	23	
11	Central Coast Mariners	26	5	3	18	26	55	−29	18	

Source: A-Leagues
Rules for classification: 1) points; 2) goal difference; 3) number of goals scored.
(C) Champions

==== Results summary ====
Overall								Home						Away					
Pld	W	D	L	GF	GA	GD	Pts	W	D	L	GF	GA	GD	W	D	L	GF	GA	GD
21	9	0	12	34	42	−8	27	6	0	5	18	19	−1	3	0	7	16	23	−7

Source: worldfootball.net

==== Results by round ====
Round	1	2	3	4	5	6	7	8	9	10	11	12	13	14	15	16	17	18	19	20	21	22	23	29	26	28	27	25
Ground	H	A	A	B	H	A	H	H	H	B	A	H	A	A	H	A	H	A	H	A	A	H	H	N	N	N	N	N
Result	L	L	W	X	W	W	W	L	W	X	L	L	L	L	W	W	W	L	W	L	L	L	L	W	D	W	D	D
Position	9	10	7	8	6	5	3	3	3	4	5	5	6	7	6	5	5	5	4	5	5	7	7	6	6	6	6	6^{1}
Points	0	0	3	3	6	9	12	12	15	15	15	15	15	15	18	21	24	24	27	27	27	27	27	30	31	34	35	36

Source: worldfootball.net
A = Away; H = Home; N = Neutral; B = Bye; W = Win; D = Draw; L = Loss; X = Bye
Notes:
^{1} Adelaide United finished their last round at 6th place, but the league season finished with Adelaide United in 7th place.

==== Matches ====
On 8 August 2019, the A-League fixtures for the season were announced. Due to the odd number of teams, Adelaide United had byes in rounds 4, 10 and 24.

11 October 2019 1	Adelaide United	2–3	Sydney FC	Adelaide
19:00 ACDT	Mileusnic 44'; A. Toure 51'	Report	Le Fondre 22', 28' (pen.); McGowan 87'	Stadium: Coopers Stadium; Attendance: 9,903; Referee: Alex King

20 October 2019 2	Melbourne City	2–1	Adelaide United	Melbourne
16:00 AEDT	Maclaren 24', 28'	Report	McGree 67'	Stadium: AAMI Park; Attendance: 7,399; Referee: Shaun Evans

26 October 2019 3	Newcastle Jets	1–2	Adelaide United	Newcastle
17:00 AEDT	Arroyo 37'	Report	McGree 49', 61'	Stadium: McDonald Jones Stadium; Attendance: 8,899; Referee: Stephen Lucas

10 November 2019 5	Adelaide United	1–0	Brisbane Roar	Adelaide
17:30 ACDT	McGree 84'	Report		Stadium: Coopers Stadium; Attendance: 8,428; Referee: Alireza Faghani

16 November 2019 6	Central Coast Mariners	1–3	Adelaide United	Gosford
17:00 AEDT	Đurić 6' (pen.)	Report	Halloran 26'; Mileusnic 38'; Opseth 45'	Stadium: Central Coast Stadium; Attendance: 5,773; Referee: Kurt Ams

23 November 2019 7	Adelaide United	3–1	Melbourne Victory	Adelaide
19:00 ACDT	McGree 23', 68'; Maria 63'	Report	Toivonen 61'	Stadium: Coopers Stadium; Attendance: 12,198; Referee: Alireza Faghani

1 December 2019 8	Adelaide United	1–2	Wellington Phoenix	Adelaide
17:30 ACDT	Mileusnic 57'	Report	Ball 67'; Dávila 71' (pen.)	Stadium: Coopers Stadium; Attendance: 6,207; Referee: Adam Fielding

8 December 2019 9	Adelaide United	2–1	Newcastle Jets	Adelaide
17:30 ACDT	Blackwood 30'; Troisi 83'	Report	Millar 48'	Stadium: Hindmarsh Stadium; Attendance: 6,074; Referee: Chris Beath

22 December 2019 11	Central Coast Mariners	2–1	Adelaide United	Gosford
18:00 AEDT	Rowles 4'; Đurić 42'	Report	Halloran 46'	Stadium: Industree Group Stadium; Attendance: 4,848; Referee: Adam Fielding

27 December 2019 12	Adelaide United	2–3	Western Sydney Wanderers	Adelaide
19:00 ACDT	A. Toure 19'; Blackwood 90+4' (pen.)	Report	Müller 11', 59'; Adam 77'	Stadium: Hindmarsh Stadium; Attendance: 8,846; Referee: Chris Beath

4 January 2020 13	Sydney FC	2–1	Adelaide United	Sydney
19:30 AEDT	Retre 20', 26'	Report	McGree 38'	Stadium: Netstrata Jubilee Stadium; Attendance: 10,219; Referee: Adam Fielding

11 January 2020 14	Perth Glory	3–0	Adelaide United	Perth
16:30 AWST	Chianese 25'; Fornaroli 44'; Ikonomidis 68'	Report		Stadium: HBF Park; Attendance: 11,168; Referee: Alex King

17 January 2020 15	Adelaide United	1–0	Melbourne Victory	Adelaide
19:00 ACDT	Halloran 32'	Report		Stadium: Coopers Stadium; Attendance: 11,412; Referee: Adam Kersey

26 January 2020 16	Western United	3–4	Adelaide United	Melbourne
18:00 AEDT	Berisha 12', 43'; Diamanti 54'	Report	Mileusnic 9', 15'; McGree 18'; Konstandopoulos 79'	Stadium: Whitten Oval; Attendance: 5,988; Referee: Kurt Ams

1 February 2020 17	Adelaide United	3–1	Melbourne City	Adelaide
19:00 ACDT	Halloran 12', 41'; Blackwood 45+2'	Report	Noone 16'	Stadium: Coopers Stadium; Attendance: 7,068; Referee: Alex King

8 February 2020 18	Brisbane Roar	2–1	Adelaide United	Brisbane
18:30 AEST	Muratovic 68'; Aldred 74'	Report	Halloran 58'	Stadium: Suncorp Stadium; Attendance: 8,945; Referee: Adam Fielding

14 February 2020 19	Adelaide United	2–0	Central Coast Mariners	Adelaide
19:00 ACDT	Blackwood 82'; M. Toure 84'	Report		Stadium: Coopers Stadium; Attendance: 7,116; Referee: Adam Kersey

21 February 2020 20	Western Sydney Wanderers	5–2	Adelaide United	Sydney
19:30 AEDT	Schwegler 5'; Müller 25'; Duke 27', 38'; Cox 73'	Report	McGree 13' (pen.); Halloran 22'	Stadium: Bankwest Stadium; Attendance: 9,231; Referee: Alex King

29 February 2020 21	Melbourne Victory	2–1	Adelaide United	Melbourne
19:00 ACDT	Rojas 57'; Nabbout 90+1'	Report	Opseth 7'	Stadium: Marvel Stadium; Attendance: 14,424; Referee: Chris Beath

7 March 2020 22	Adelaide United	1–5	Western United	Adelaide
16:30 ACDT	McGree 25'	Report	Berisha 18', 56'; Diamanti 32'; Burgess 38'; Pain 48'	Stadium: Coopers Stadium; Attendance: 8,473; Referee: Stephen Lucas

15 March 2020 23	Adelaide United	0–3	Newcastle Jets	Adelaide
17:40 ACDT		Report	O'Donovan 41'; Millar 51'; Ugarkovic 54'	Stadium: Coopers Stadium; Attendance: 4,286; Referee: Jonathon Barreiro

Season postponement due to the COVID-19 pandemic in Australia

19 July 2020 29	Brisbane Roar	0–1	Adelaide United	Gold Coast
19:30 AEST		Report	Opseth 6'	Stadium: Cbus Super Stadium; Attendance: 1,035; Referee: Alireza Faghani
Note: Match originally scheduled for 25 April at Suncorp Stadium, but postponed and relocated due to the COVID-19 pandemic in Australia. It was rescheduled to 19 July at Cbus Super Stadium.

25 July 2020 26	Wellington Phoenix	1–1	Adelaide United	Sydney
17:00 AEST	Sotirio 65'	Report	Opseth 60'	Stadium: Bankwest Stadium; Attendance: 0 (behind closed doors due to the COVID-19 pandemic in Australia); Referee: Kurt Ams
Note: Match originally scheduled for 5 April at Sky Stadium, but postponed and relocated due to the COVID-19 pandemic in Australia. It was rescheduled to 25 July at Bankwest Stadium.

30 July 2020 28	Adelaide United	5–3	Perth Glory	Sydney
19:30 AEST	Jakobsen 27'; Brook 29'; Opseth 38'; Halloran 45'; Niyongabire 63'	Report	Popovic 33'; Fornaroli 74'; Juande 83' (pen.)	Stadium: Bankwest Stadium; Attendance: 0 (behind closed doors due to the COVID-19 pandemic in Australia); Referee: Stephen Lucas
Note: Match originally scheduled for 17 April at Coopers Stadium, but postponed and relocated due to the COVID-19 pandemic in Australia. It was rescheduled to 30 July at Bankwest Stadium.

6 August 2020 27	Adelaide United	1–1	Sydney FC	Sydney
19:30 AEST	Elsey 13'	Report	Le Fondre 39'	Stadium: ANZ Stadium; Attendance: 0 (behind closed doors due to the COVID-19 pandemic in Australia); Referee: Ben Abraham
Note: Match originally scheduled for 11 April at Coopers Stadium, but postponed and relocated due to the COVID-19 pandemic in Australia. It was rescheduled to 6 August at ANZ Stadium.

11 August 2020 25	Melbourne City	2–2	Adelaide United	Sydney
19:30 AEST	Luna 34'; Maclaren 40'	Report	Opseth 78' (pen.); Halloran 90+1'	Stadium: ANZ Stadium; Attendance: 0 (behind closed doors due to the COVID-19 pandemic in Australia); Referee: Alex King
Note: Match originally scheduled for 27 March at AAMI Park, but postponed and relocated due to the COVID-19 pandemic in Australia. It was rescheduled to 11 August at ANZ Stadium.

=== FFA Cup ===
7 August 2019 Round of 32	Melbourne Knights	2–5	Adelaide United	Melbourne
19:30 AEST	Albano 28'; Bryce 72'	Report	A. Toure 12'; Halloran 24', 75'; N. Konstandopoulos 56'; McGree 60'	Stadium: Knights Stadium; Attendance: 4,087; Referee: Lachlan Keevers

21 August 2019 Round of 16	Olympic FC	2–3	Adelaide United	Brisbane
19:30 AEST	Psaros 12'; Lucas 64' (pen.)	Report	A. Toure 9', 27'; Blackwood 84' (pen.)	Stadium: Perry Park; Attendance: 1,030; Referee: Chris Beath

17 September 2019 Quarter-final	Adelaide United	1–0	Newcastle Jets	Adelaide
19:00 ACST	A. Toure 42'	Report		Stadium: Coopers Stadium; Attendance: 4,807; Referee: Daniel Elder

2 October 2019 Semi-final	Central Coast Mariners	1–2	Adelaide United	Gosford
19:30 AEST	Clisby 63'	Report	Blackwood 74'; McGree 90'	Stadium: Central Coast Stadium; Attendance: 5,572; Referee: Shaun Evans

23 October 2019 Final	Adelaide United	4–0	Melbourne City	Adelaide
19:00 ACDST	A. Toure 25'; Halloran 49'; Mileusnic 60'; McGree 75'	Report		Stadium: Coopers Stadium; Attendance: 14,920; Referee: Alex King

== Statistics ==
=== Appearances and goals ===
Includes all competitions. Players with no appearances not included in the list.

No.	Pos	Nat	Player	Total		A-League		FFA Cup	
No.	Pos	Nat	Player	Apps	Goals	Apps	Goals	Apps	Goals
2	DF	(Australia) AUS	Michael Marrone	17	0	10+4	0	3	0
4	DF	(England) ENG	Ryan Strain	27	0	22	0	3+2	0
6	MF	(Australia) AUS	Stefan Mauk	9	0	9	0	0	0
7	DF	(Australia) AUS	Ryan Kitto	27	0	11+11	0	5	0
8	MF	(Australia) AUS	Riley McGree	28	13	23	10	5	3
10	MF	(Australia) AUS	James Troisi	13	1	13	1	0	0
11	FW	(Norway) NOR	Kristian Opseth	24	6	14+7	6	1+2	0
14	FW	(Australia) AUS	George Blackwood	23	6	14+7	4	1+1	2
16	MF	(Australia) AUS	Nathan Konstandopoulos	13	2	2+7	1	2+2	1
17	FW	(Australia) AUS	Nikola Mileusnic	27	6	21+1	5	2+3	1
18	FW	(Australia) AUS	Lachlan Brook	8	1	4+3	1	0+1	0
20	GK	(Australia) AUS	Paul Izzo	29	0	25	0	4	0
22	DF	(Denmark) DEN	Michael Jakobsen	31	1	26	1	5	0
23	DF	(Australia) AUS	Jordan Elsey	25	1	18+3	1	4	0
24	FW	(Burundi) BDI	Pacifique Niyongabire	5	1	0+3	1	0+2	0
26	FW	(Australia) AUS	Ben Halloran	26	12	21	9	5	3
27	MF	(Australia) AUS	Louis D'Arrigo	23	0	19+2	0	2	0
29	FW	(Australia) AUS	Kusini Yengi	3	0	0+3	0	0	0
34	MF	(Australia) AUS	Yared Abetew	1	0	1	0	0	0
35	FW	(Australia) AUS	Al Hassan Toure	17	7	7+5	2	5	5
36	DF	(Australia) AUS	Noah Smith	1	0	0+1	0	0	0
42	FW	(Australia) AUS	Taras Gomulka	5	0	5	0	0	0
49	FW	(Australia) AUS	Mohamed Toure	9	1	0+9	1	0	0
Player(s) transferred out but featured this season
5	DF	(Curaçao) CUW	Michaël Maria	24	1	18+3	1	3	0
6	MF	(Australia) AUS	Vince Lia	5	0	1+1	0	1+2	0
30	GK	(Australia) AUS	Isaac Richards	2	0	1	0	1	0
31	MF	(Germany) GER	Mirko Boland	8	0	1+4	0	3	0

=== Disciplinary record ===
Includes all competitions. The list is sorted by squad number when total cards are equal. Players with no cards not included in the list.

No.	Pos	Nat	Player	Total			A-League			FFA Cup		
No.	Pos	Nat	Player	Yellow card	Second yellow card	Red card	Yellow card	Second yellow card	Red card	Yellow card	Second yellow card	Red card
4	DF	(England) ENG	Ryan Strain	6	0	1	5	0	1	1	0	0
22	DF	(Denmark) DEN	Michael Jakobsen	6	0	0	5	0	0	1	0	0
8	MF	(Australia) AUS	Riley McGree	5	0	0	3	0	0	2	0	0
26	FW	(Australia) AUS	Ben Halloran	5	0	0	4	0	0	1	0	0
27	MF	(Australia) AUS	Louis D'Arrigo	4	0	0	4	0	0	0	0	0
7	DF	(Australia) AUS	Ryan Kitto	3	0	0	1	0	0	2	0	0
23	DF	(Australia) AUS	Jordan Elsey	3	0	0	3	0	0	0	0	0
5	DF	(Curaçao) CUW	Michaël Maria	2	0	0	2	0	0	0	0	0
6	MF	(Australia) AUS	Stefan Mauk	2	0	0	2	0	0	0	0	0
14	FW	(Australia) AUS	George Blackwood	2	0	0	2	0	0	0	0	0
42	FW	(Australia) AUS	Taras Gomulka	2	0	0	2	0	0	0	0	0
49	FW	(Australia) AUS	Mohamed Toure	2	0	0	2	0	0	0	0	0
2	DF	(Australia) AUS	Michael Marrone	1	0	0	1	0	0	0	0	0
10	MF	(Australia) AUS	James Troisi	1	0	0	1	0	0	0	0	0
11	FW	(Norway) NOR	Kristian Opseth	1	0	0	1	0	0	0	0	0
16	MF	(Australia) AUS	Nathan Konstandopoulos	1	0	0	1	0	0	0	0	0
20	GK	(Australia) AUS	Paul Izzo	1	0	0	1	0	0	0	0	0
31	MF	(Germany) GER	Mirko Boland	1	0	0	1	0	0	0	0	0
35	FW	(Australia) AUS	Al Hassan Toure	1	0	0	1	0	0	0	0	0

- (yellow card) = Number of bookings; (second yellow card) = Number of sending offs after a second yellow card; (red card) = Number of sending offs by a direct red card.

=== Clean sheets ===
Includes all competitions. The list is sorted by squad number when total clean sheets are equal. Numbers in parentheses represent games where both goalkeepers participated and both kept a clean sheet; the number in parentheses is awarded to the goalkeeper who was substituted on, whilst a full clean sheet is awarded to the goalkeeper who was on the field at the start of play. Goalkeepers with no clean sheets not included in the list.

Rank	No.	Nat.	Goalkeeper	A-League	FFA Cup	Total
1	20	(Australia)	Paul Izzo	4	2	6

== Awards ==
=== Adelaide United Goal of the Month award ===
Adelaide United Goal of the Month award winners were chosen via open-access polls on the club's official website.

Month	Player	Competition	Opponent	Votes
October	Al Hassan Toure (AUS)	FFA Cup	Melbourne City	66%
November	Nikola Mileusnic (AUS)	A-League	Central Coast Mariners	54%
December	Nikola Mileusnic (AUS)	A-League	Wellington Phoenix	70%
January	Not awarded			
February	Not awarded			
March	Not awarded			
April	Not awarded			
May	Not awarded			
June	Not awarded			
July	Not awarded			
August	Not awarded			
