= 2017–18 Adelaide United FC season =

Adelaide United
2017–18 season
- Chairman: Greg Griffin
- Manager: Marco Kurz
- Stadium: Coopers Stadium, Adelaide
- A-League: 5th
- A-League Finals Series: Elimination-finals
- FFA Cup: Runners-up
- Top goalscorer: League: Ryan Kitto (7 goals); All: Johan Absalonsen (8 goals)
- Highest home attendance: 19,416 vs Melbourne Victory; 20 October 2017
- Lowest home attendance: 7,021 vs Sydney FC; 1 December 2017
- Average home league attendance: 9,830
Home colours	Away colours

The 2017–18 Adelaide United FC season was the club's 14th season since its establishment in 2003. The club participated in the A-League for the 13th time and the FFA Cup for the 4th time.

== Players ==
=== Squad information ===
Note: Flags indicate national team as defined under FIFA eligibility rules; some limited exceptions apply. Players may hold more than one non-FIFA nationality.

No.	Pos.	Nation	Player
1	GK	AUS	Daniel Margush
2	DF	AUS	Michael Marrone
5	DF	AUS	Taylor Regan
6	MF	AUS	Vince Lia
7	MF	AUS	Ryan Kitto
8	MF	ESP	Isaías (Captain)
9	FW	SEN	Baba Diawara
11	MF	DEN	Johan Absalonsen
12	DF	AUS	Mark Ochieng
14	FW	AUS	George Blackwood
16	MF	AUS	Nathan Konstandopoulos
17	MF	AUS	Nikola Mileusnic
19	DF	AUS	Ben Garuccio

No.	Pos.	Nation	Player
20	GK	AUS	Paul Izzo
21	DF	AUS	Tarek Elrich
22	DF	TUR	Ersan Gülüm (on loan from Hebei China Fortune)
23	DF	AUS	Jordan Elsey
24	MF	AUS	Jordan O'Doherty
25	FW	AUS	Apostolos Stamatelopoulos (Scholarship)
28	FW	AUS	Kristin Konstandopoulos (Scholarship)
29	DF	AUS	Ryan Strain
30	GK	AUS	Isaac Richards (Scholarship)
31	FW	BDI	Pacifique Niyongabire (Scholarship)
37	MF	GER	Daniel Adlung
77	FW	SLO	Džengis Čavušević

== Transfers ==
=== Transfers in ===
No.	Position	Player	Transferred from	Type/fee	Contract length	Date	Ref
20	GK	Paul Izzo	Central Coast Mariners	Free transfer	3 years	19 April 2017	
14	FW	George Blackwood		Free transfer		6 July 2017	
22	DF	(Turkey) Ersan Gülüm	Hebei China Fortune	Loan	1 year	17 July 2017	
11	MF	(Denmark) Johan Absalonsen		Free transfer	1 year	18 July 2017	
6	MF	Vince Lia	Wellington Phoenix	Free transfer	1 year	3 August 2017	
10	MF	(Algeria) Karim Matmour		Free transfer	1 year	15 August 2017	
37	MF	(Germany) Daniel Adlung		Free transfer	2 years	23 September 2017	
77	FW	(Slovenia) Džengis Čavušević		Free transfer	6 months	6 February 2018	

=== Transfers out ===
No.	Position	Player	Transferred to	Type/fee	Date	Ref
4	DF	Dylan McGowan	(Portugal) Paços de Ferreira	Free transfer	16 May 2017	
11	FW	(Spain) Sergio Cirio		End of contract	17 May 2017	
14	MF	George Mells		End of contract	17 May 2017	
16	MF	Jesse Makarounas		End of contract	17 May 2017	
20	GK	John Hall		End of contract	17 May 2017	
1	GK	Eugene Galekovic	Melbourne City	End of contract	16 June 2017	
7	MF	(South Korea) Kim Jae-sung	(South Korea) Jeonnam Dragons	End of contract	28 June 2017	
18	MF	Riley McGree	(Belgium) Club Brugge	$100,000	4 July 2017	
13	FW	Marc Marino	(Australia) Campbelltown City	End of contract	7 July 2017	
10	MF	(Argentina) Marcelo Carrusca		End of contract	8 July 2017	
3	DF	(Italy) Iacopo La Rocca	Melbourne City	End of contract	15 July 2017	
92	FW	Eli Babalj		End of contract	30 July 2017	
10	MF	(Algeria) Karim Matmour		Mutual contract termination	5 December 2017	
4	DF	Ben Warland	Sydney FC	Free transfer	31 January 2018	

=== From youth squad ===
N	Pos.	Nat.	Name	Age	Notes
25	FW	(Australia)	Apostolos Stamatelopoulos	18	2 year scholarship contract
28	FW	(Australia)	Kristin Konstandopoulos	18	2 year scholarship contract
29	DF	(Australia)	Ryan Strain	20	1 year scholarship contract
30	GK	(Australia)	Isaac Richards	19	0.5 year scholarship contract
31	FW	(Burundi)	Pacifique Niyongabire	17	2.5 year scholarship contract

=== Contract extensions ===
No.	Name	Position	Duration	Date	Notes
4	Ben Warland	Defender	2 years	11 May 2017	
9	(Senegal) Baba Diawara	Striker	2 years	11 May 2017	
7	Ryan Kitto	Right winger	1 year	11 May 2017	
17	Nikola Mileusnic	Attacking midfielder	1 year	11 May 2017	
12	Mark Ochieng	Defender	1 year	16 June 2017	
23	Jordan Elsey	Centre back	1 year	8 August 2017	
1	Daniel Margush	Goalkeeper	2 years	18 October 2017	
7	Ryan Kitto	Right winger	2 years	14 December 2017	
16	Nathan Konstandopoulos	Central midfielder	2 years	14 December 2017	
17	Nikola Mileusnic	Attacking midfielder	1 year	14 December 2017	
29	(England) Ryan Strain	Right-back	2 years	22 December 2017	

=== Technical staff ===
Position	Staff
Head coach	(Germany) Marco Kurz
Assistant coach	(Spain) Jacobo Ramallo
Assistant coach	(Croatia) Filip Tapalović
High Performance Manager	Vacant
Goalkeeper coach	(Australia) Frank Juric
Youth team coach	(Australia) Paul Pezos
Physiotherapist	(Australia) Harry Truong

== Squad statistics ==
=== Appearances and goals ===
N	Pos.	Nat.	Name	Total					A-League					A-League Finals Series					FFA Cup
N	Pos.	Nat.	Name	Apps	Goals	Yellow card	Second yellow card	Red card	Apps	Goals	Yellow card	Second yellow card	Red card	Apps	Goals	Yellow card	Second yellow card	Red card	Apps	Goals	Yellow card	Second yellow card	Red card
1	GK	(Australia)	Daniel Margush	4	0	0	0	0	4+0	0	0	0	0	0+0	0	0	0	0	0+0	0	0	0	0
2	DF	(Australia)	Michael Marrone	30	1	1	0	1	16+8	0	1	0	0	1+0	0	0	0	0	5+0	1	0	0	1
5	DF	(Australia)	Taylor Regan	16	0	6	0	0	5+8	0	5	0	0	0+0	0	0	0	0	3+0	0	1	0	0
6	MF	(Australia)	Vince Lia	11	2	4	0	0	5+3	2	2	0	0	0+1	0	1	0	0	2+0	0	1	0	0
7	MF	(Australia)	Ryan Kitto	27	7	2	0	0	15+8	7	2	0	0	0+1	0	0	0	0	2+1	0	0	0	0
8	MF	(Spain)	Isaías	30	0	8	0	0	24+0	0	7	0	0	1+0	0	0	0	0	5+0	0	1	0	0
9	FW	(Senegal)	Baba Diawara	17	2	2	0	0	8+3	2	1	0	0	1+0	0	1	0	0	1+4	0	0	0	0
11	MF	(Denmark)	Johan Absalonsen	16	8	2	0	0	8+3	6	1	0	0	1+0	0	0	0	0	4+0	2	1	0	0
12	DF	(Australia)	Mark Ochieng	17	0	3	0	0	3+10	0	2	0	0	0+0	0	0	0	0	0+4	0	1	0	0
14	FW	(Australia)	George Blackwood	29	6	2	0	0	15+8	5	2	0	0	0+1	0	0	0	0	4+1	1	0	0	0
16	MF	(Australia)	Nathan Konstandopoulos	27	3	1	0	0	13+9	2	1	0	0	1+0	0	0	0	0	3+1	1	0	0	0
17	MF	(Australia)	Nikola Mileusnic	31	7	0	0	0	25+0	2	0	0	0	1+0	1	0	0	0	5+0	4	0	0	0
18	MF	(Australia)	Lachlan Brook	1	0	0	0	0	1+0	0	0	0	0	0+0	0	0	0	0	0+0	0	0	0	0
19	DF	(Australia)	Ben Garuccio	27	1	4	1	1	21+1	1	3	1	1	1+0	0	1	0	0	4+0	0	0	0	0
20	GK	(Australia)	Paul Izzo	29	0	1	0	0	23+0	0	1	0	0	1+0	0	0	0	0	5+0	0	0	0	0
21	DF	(Australia)	Tarek Elrich	3	0	0	0	0	1+2	0	0	0	0	0+0	0	0	0	0	0+0	0	0	0	0
22	DF	(Turkey)	Ersan Gülüm	22	0	7	0	1	20+0	0	6	0	1	1+0	0	0	0	0	1+0	0	1	0	0
23	DF	(Australia)	Jordan Elsey	33	1	7	0	0	26+1	1	6	0	0	1+0	0	0	0	0	5+0	0	1	0	0
24	MF	(Australia)	Jordan O'Doherty	13	0	3	0	0	8+3	0	3	0	0	0+0	0	0	0	0	1+1	0	0	0	0
25	FW	(Australia)	Apostolos Stamatelopoulos	7	1	0	0	0	2+5	1	0	0	0	0+0	0	0	0	0	0+0	0	0	0	0
26	FW	(Australia)	Blake Carpenter	0	0	0	0	0	0+0	0	0	0	0	0+0	0	0	0	0	0+0	0	0	0	0
27	MF	(Australia)	Louis D'Arrigo	0	0	0	0	0	0+0	0	0	0	0	0+0	0	0	0	0	0+0	0	0	0	0
28	FW	(Australia)	Kristin Konstandopoulos	1	0	0	0	0	0+1	0	0	0	0	0+0	0	0	0	0	0+0	0	0	0	0
29	DF	(Australia)	Ryan Strain	16	0	1	0	0	15+1	0	1	0	0	0+0	0	0	0	0	0+0	0	0	0	0
30	GK	(Australia)	Isaac Richards	0	0	0	0	0	0+0	0	0	0	0	0+0	0	0	0	0	0+0	0	0	0	0
31	FW	(Burundi)	Pacifique Niyongabire	1	0	1	0	0	0+1	0	1	0	0	0+0	0	0	0	0	0+0	0	0	0	0
37	MF	(Germany)	Daniel Adlung	27	6	5	1	0	24+0	5	4	1	0	1+0	0	0	0	0	2+0	1	1	0	0
77	FW	(Slovenia)	Džengis Čavušević	4	1	1	0	1	2+2	1	1	0	1	0+0	0	0	0	0	0+0	0	0	0	0
Players no longer at the club:
4	DF	(Australia)	Ben Warland	8	0	1	0	0	4+2	0	0	0	0	0+0	0	0	0	0	1+1	0	1	0	0
10	MF	(Algeria)	Karim Matmour	11	0	2	0	0	6+2	0	2	0	0	0+0	0	0	0	0	2+1	0	0	0	0

- Last updated: 22 April 2018
- Source: au.soccerway.com
- (yellow card) = Number of bookings; (second yellow card) = Number of sending offs after a second yellow card; (red card) = Number of sending offs by a direct red card.

== Pre-season and friendlies ==
26 July 2017	White City (Australia)	0–5	(Australia) Adelaide United	Adelaide, Australia
19:00 ACST		Report	Mileusnic 11'; Blackwood 31'; Elsey 36'; Wilson 76'; Marino 87'	Stadium: Marden Sports Complex

2 August 2017	Adelaide United (Australia)	4–0	(Australia) Adelaide Comets	Adelaide, Australia
19:30 ACST	Absalonsen 21'; Regan 61'; Ochieng 68'; Brook 87'	Report		Stadium: Marden Sports Complex

16 August 2017	Campbelltown City (Australia)	1–1	(Australia) Adelaide United	Adelaide, Australia
	Marino 47'	Report	Diawara 62'	Stadium: Steve Woodcock Centre

5 September 2017	Melbourne City (Australia)	1–2	(Australia) Adelaide United	Melbourne, Australia
	Mauk 60'	Report	Blackwood 70' (pen.); O'Doherty 120'	Stadium: City Football Academy; Attendance: 0 (behind closed doors)

22 September 2017	Adelaide United (Australia)	1–0	(Australia) Adelaide City	Adelaide, Australia
	Ochieng 14'	Report		Stadium: Marden Sports Complex; Attendance: 0 (behind closed doors)

29 September 2017	Adelaide United (Australia)	0–2	(Australia) Melbourne City	Adelaide, Australia
		Report	Fitzgerald 42'; Mauk 55'	Stadium: Coopers Stadium; Attendance: 0 (behind closed doors)

== Competitions ==
=== Overall ===
Competition	Started round	Final position / round	First match	Last match
A-League	—	5th	8 October 2017	15 April 2018
A-League Finals	Elimination-finals	Elimination-finals	22 April 2018	22 April 2018
FFA Cup	Round of 32	Runners-up	9 August 2017	21 November 2017

=== A-League ===
==== League table ====
Pos	Team	Pld	W	D	L	GF	GA	GD	Pts	Qualification
1	Sydney FC	27	20	4	3	64	22	+42	64	Qualification for 2019 AFC Champions League group stage and Finals series
2	Newcastle Jets	27	15	5	7	57	37	+20	50	Qualification for 2019 AFC Champions League second preliminary round and Finals series
3	Melbourne City	27	13	4	10	41	33	+8	43	Qualification for Finals series
4	Melbourne Victory (C)	27	12	5	10	43	37	+6	41	Qualification for 2019 AFC Champions League group stage and Finals series
5	Adelaide United	27	11	6	10	36	38	−2	39	Qualification for Finals series
6	Brisbane Roar	27	10	5	12	33	40	−7	35	Qualification for Finals series
7	Western Sydney Wanderers	27	8	9	10	38	47	−9	33	
8	Perth Glory	27	10	2	15	37	50	−13	32	
9	Wellington Phoenix (Note: Wellington Phoenix cannot qualify for the AFC Champions League as they are not recognised as an AFC club.)	27	5	6	16	31	55	−24	21	
10	Central Coast Mariners	27	4	8	15	28	49	−21	20	

Source: A-Leagues
Rules for classification: 1) points; 2) goal difference; 3) number of goals scored.
(C) Champions

==== Results summary ====
Overall								Home						Away					
Pld	W	D	L	GF	GA	GD	Pts	W	D	L	GF	GA	GD	W	D	L	GF	GA	GD
27	11	6	10	36	38	−2	39	5	4	4	20	16	+4	6	2	6	16	22	−6

Last updated: 15 April 2018.
Source: ultimatealeague.com

==== Results by round ====
Round	1	2	3	4	5	6	7	8	9	10	11	12	13	14	15	16	17	18	19	20	21	22	23	24	25	26	27
Ground	A	A	H	H	A	H	A	H	H	A	A	H	H	A	A	H	A	A	H	H	A	A	H	H	H	A	A
Result	D	W	D	L	L	L	W	W	L	W	L	W	L	W	D	D	L	W	W	D	L	L	D	W	W	L	W
Position	5	5	5	5	6	8	5	4	5	4	4	4	5	4	4	5	5	5	4	4	5	6	5	5	5	5	5

Updated to match(es) played on 15 April 2018. Source: ultimatealeague.com
A = Away; H = Home; W = Win; D = Draw; L = Loss

==== Matches ====
8 October 2017 1	Wellington Phoenix	1–1	Adelaide United	Wellington
17:00 NZDT	Vidošić 5'	Report	Absalonsen 9'	Stadium: Westpac Stadium; Attendance: 8,154; Referee: Chris Beath

13 October 2017 2	Brisbane Roar	1–2	Adelaide United	Brisbane
18:50 AEST	Maccarone 8'	Report	Kitto 88'; Absalonsen 90+2'	Stadium: Suncorp Stadium; Attendance: 11,178; Referee: Adam Kersey

20 October 2017 3	Adelaide United	2–2	Melbourne Victory	Adelaide
19:20 ACDT	Lia 23', 62'	Report	Berisha 13'; Austin 82'	Stadium: Adelaide Oval; Attendance: 19,416; Referee: Shaun Evans

28 October 2017 4	Adelaide United	0–2	Melbourne City	Adelaide
19:20 ACDT		Report	McCormack 11' (pen.), 16'	Stadium: Coopers Stadium; Attendance: 11,689; Referee: Kurt Ams

4 November 2017 5	Perth Glory	1–0	Adelaide United	Perth
19:00 AWST	Keogh 80'	Report		Stadium: nib Stadium; Attendance: 11,049; Referee: Stephen Lucas

11 November 2017 6	Adelaide United	1–2	Newcastle Jets	Adelaide
17:05 ACDT	Mileusnic 24'	Report	Kantarovski 45'; Nabbout 47'	Stadium: Coopers Stadium; Attendance: 8,416; Referee: Jarred Gillett

16 November 2017 7	Central Coast Mariners	1–2	Adelaide United	Gosford
19:50 AEDT	Brama 40' (pen.)	Report	Adlung 59'; Kitto 90+3'	Stadium: Central Coast Stadium; Attendance: 5,073; Referee: Matthew Conger

26 November 2017 8	Adelaide United	2–0	Western Sydney Wanderers	Adelaide
18:30 ACDT	Kitto 45+1', 63'	Report		Stadium: Coopers Stadium; Attendance: 8,210; Referee: Chris Beath

1 December 2017 9	Adelaide United	0–1	Sydney FC	Adelaide
19:20 ACDT		Report	Bobô 45'	Stadium: Coopers Stadium; Attendance: 7,021; Referee: Peter Green

8 December 2017 10	Melbourne Victory	1–2	Adelaide United	Melbourne
19:50 AEDT	Milligan 56'	Report	Diawara 17'; Blackwood 72'	Stadium: Etihad Stadium; Attendance: 16,778; Referee: Kurt Ams

16 December 2017 11	Newcastle Jets	2–1	Adelaide United	Newcastle
17:35 AEDT	Nabbout 55'; D. Petratos 89' (pen.)	Report	Blackwood 67'	Stadium: McDonald Jones Stadium; Attendance: 8,146; Referee: Stephan Lucas

26 December 2017 12	Adelaide United	1–0	Central Coast Mariners	Adelaide
19:20 ACDT	Kitto 14'	Report		Stadium: Coopers Stadium; Attendance: 10,313; Referee: Peter Green

30 December 2017 13	Adelaide United	1–2	Brisbane Roar	Adelaide
17:05 ACDT	Blackwood 69'	Report	Khalfallah 33'; Maccarone 45'	Stadium: Coopers Stadium; Attendance: 9,875; Referee: Adam Fielding

5 January 2018 14	Perth Glory	0–3	Adelaide United	Perth
19:00 AWST		Report	Adlung 10'; N. Konstandopoulos 71'; Absalonsen 85'	Stadium: nib Stadium; Attendance: 9,069; Referee: Kurt Ams

10 January 2018 15	Western Sydney Wanderers	1–1	Adelaide United	Sydney
19:50 AEDT	Clisby 52'	Report	Stamatelopoulos 86'	Stadium: ANZ Stadium; Attendance: 10,771; Referee: Shaun Evans

14 January 2018 16	Adelaide United	0–0	Sydney FC	Adelaide
18:30 ACDT		Report		Stadium: Coopers Stadium; Attendance: 9,959; Referee: Jarred Gillett

21 January 2018 17	Melbourne City	5–0	Adelaide United	Melbourne
19:00 AEDT	Budziński 30', 35'; Vidošić 89', 90+2'; McCormack 90+6'	Report		Stadium: AAMI Park; Attendance: 8,103; Referee: Adam Fielding

27 January 2018 18	Wellington Phoenix	0–1	Adelaide United	Wellington
19:35 NZDT		Report	Blackwood 32'	Stadium: Westpac Stadium; Attendance: 6,746; Referee: Shaun Evans

3 February 2018 19	Adelaide United	2–1	Perth Glory	Adelaide
19:20 ACDT	Djulbic 12' (o.g.); Mileusnic 38'	Report	Keogh 5'	Stadium: Coopers Stadium; Attendance: 7,976; Referee: Chris Beath

17 February 2018 20	Adelaide United	2–2	Central Coast Mariners	Adelaide
19:20 ACDT	Elsey 61'; Blackwood 83'	Report	Hoole 7'; Strain 53' (o.g.)	Stadium: Coopers Stadium; Attendance: 8,282; Referee: Shaun Evans

24 February 2018 21	Melbourne Victory	3–0	Adelaide United	Melbourne
19:50 AEDT	Regan 22' (o.g.); George 29'; Berisha 59'	Report		Stadium: AAMI Park; Attendance: 13,396; Referee: Alex King

3 March 2018 22	Brisbane Roar	1–0	Adelaide United	Brisbane
18:50 AEST	Bauthéac 41'	Report		Stadium: Suncorp Stadium; Attendance: 8,237; Referee: Peter Green

16 March 2018 23	Adelaide United	1–1	Melbourne City	Adelaide
19:20 ACDT	Absalonsen 45+1'	Report	Mauk 53'	Stadium: Coopers Stadium; Attendance: 7,668; Referee: Chris Beath

23 March 2018 24	Adelaide United	5–2	Newcastle Jets	Adelaide
19:20 ACDT	Adlung 15', 45+1'; Kitto 62'; Absalonsen 71'; Čavušević 79'	Report	Kantarovski 62', 89'	Stadium: Coopers Stadium; Attendance: 7,227; Referee: Kurt Ams

30 March 2018 25	Adelaide United	3–1	Wellington Phoenix	Adelaide
19:20 ACDT	Absalonsen 42'; Garuccio 61'; N. Konstandopoulos 63'	Report	Rogerson 84' (pen.)	Stadium: Coopers Stadium; Attendance: 11,738; Referee: Peter Green

8 April 2018 26	Sydney FC	3–0	Adelaide United	Sydney
19:00 AEST	Simon 45+3'; Bobô 59', 66'	Report		Stadium: Allianz Stadium; Attendance: 9,110; Referee: Shaun Evans

15 April 2018 27	Western Sydney Wanderers	2–3	Adelaide United	Sydney
17:00 AEST	Riera 15' (pen.); Carrusca 42'	Report	Diawara 21'; Adlung 39'; Kitto 80'	Stadium: ANZ Stadium; Attendance: 12,122; Referee: Kris Griffiths-Jones

==== Finals series ====
22 April 2018 Elimination-final	Melbourne Victory	2–1	Adelaide United	Melbourne
18:00 AEST	George 63'; Berisha 89'	Report	Mileusnic 57'	Stadium: AAMI Park; Attendance: 15,502; Referee: Chris Beath

=== FFA Cup ===
9 August 2017 Round of 32	Adelaide United (South Australia)	1–0	(New South Wales) Newcastle Jets	Adelaide
19:00 ACST	Marrone 63'	Report		Stadium: Marden Sports Complex; Attendance: 2,551; Referee: Kris Griffiths-Jones

23 August 2017 Round of 16	Adelaide United (South Australia)	3–0	(Victoria (state)) Melbourne Victory	Adelaide
19:00 ACST	Absalonsen 53'; Blackwood 66' (pen.); N. Konstandopoulos 89'	Report		Stadium: Marden Sports Complex; Attendance: 3,342; Referee: Jonathan Barreiro

13 September 2017 Quarter-finals	Heidelberg United (Victoria (state))	0–3	(South Australia) Adelaide United	Melbourne
19:30 AEST		Report	Mileusnic 3', 11', 61'	Stadium: Olympic Park; Attendance: 3,967; Referee: Daniel Elder

24 October 2017 Semi-finals	Western Sydney Wanderers (New South Wales)	1–2	(South Australia) Adelaide United	Sydney
19:30 AEDT	Santalab 70' (pen.)	Report	Absalonsen 13'; Adlung 58'	Stadium: Campbelltown Stadium; Attendance: 5,126; Referee: Peter Green

21 November 2017 Final	Sydney FC (New South Wales)	2–1 (a.e.t.)	(South Australia) Adelaide United	Sydney
19:30 AEDT	Ninkovic 19'; Bobô 111'	Report	Mileusnic 67'	Stadium: Allianz Stadium; Attendance: 13,452; Referee: Kris Griffiths-Jones

== See also ==
- 2017–18 Adelaide United FC (women) season
