= 2018–19 Adelaide United FC season =

Adelaide United
2018–19 season
- Chairman: Piet van der Pol
- Manager: Marco Kurz
- Stadium: Coopers Stadium, Adelaide
- A-League: 4th
- A-League Finals Series: Semi-finals
- FFA Cup: Champions
- Top goalscorer: League: Craig Goodwin (10 goals); All: Craig Goodwin (15 goals)
- Highest home attendance: 12,866 vs. Melbourne Victory (19 April 2019)
- Lowest home attendance: 7,071 vs. Brisbane Roar (2 February 2019)
- Average home league attendance: 9,295
Home colours	Away colours

The 2018–19 Adelaide United FC season was the club's 15th season since its establishment in 2003. The club participated in the A-League for the 14th time and the FFA Cup for the 5th time.

== Players ==
=== Squad information ===
Note: Flags indicate national team as defined under FIFA eligibility rules; some limited exceptions apply. Players may hold more than one non-FIFA nationality.

No.	Pos.	Nation	Player
1	GK	AUS	Daniel Margush
2	DF	AUS	Michael Marrone
3	DF	AUS	Scott Galloway
4	DF	AUS	Ryan Strain
6	MF	AUS	Vince Lia
7	MF	AUS	Ryan Kitto
8	MF	ESP	Isaías (Captain)
9	FW	SEN	Baba Diawara
10	FW	DEN	Ken Ilsø
11	FW	AUS	Craig Goodwin
14	FW	AUS	George Blackwood
16	MF	AUS	Nathan Konstandopoulos

No.	Pos.	Nation	Player
17	MF	AUS	Nikola Mileusnic
19	FW	NED	Jordy Thomassen (on loan from De Graafschap)
20	GK	AUS	Paul Izzo
22	DF	DEN	Michael Jakobsen
23	DF	AUS	Jordan Elsey
24	FW	BDI	Pacifique Niyongabire (Scholarship)
26	MF	AUS	Ben Halloran
27	MF	AUS	Louis D'Arrigo (Scholarship)
30	GK	AUS	Isaac Richards
31	MF	GER	Mirko Boland
32	FW	AUS	Carlo Armiento (Scholarship)
33	FW	AUS	Apostolos Stamatelopoulos

== Transfers ==
=== Transfers in ===
No.	Position	Player	Transferred from	Type/fee	Contract length	Date	Ref
22	DF	(Denmark) Michael Jakobsen	Melbourne City	Free transfer	2 years	14 May 2018	
11	FW	Craig Goodwin		Free transfer	3 years	25 May 2018	
10	FW	(Denmark) Ken Ilsø		—	1 year	6 July 2018	
31	MF	(Germany) Mirko Boland	(Germany) Eintracht Braunschweig	Free transfer	2 years	21 July 2018	
3	DF	Scott Galloway		Free transfer	1 year	31 July 2018	
26	MF	Ben Halloran		Free transfer	2 years	14 August 2018	
19	FW	(Netherlands) Jordy Thomassen	(Netherlands) De Graafschap	Loan	6 months	31 January 2019	

=== Transfers out ===
No.	Position	Player	Transferred to	Type/fee	Date	Ref
21	DF	Tarek Elrich	Western Sydney Wanderers	Free transfer	9 May 2018	
11	MF	(Denmark) Johan Absalonsen	(Denmark) SønderjyskE	Free transfer	23 May 2018	
19	DF	Ben Garuccio	(Scotland) Heart of Midlothian	Free transfer	24 May 2018	
12	MF	Mark Ochieng		End of contract	25 May 2018	
24	FW	Jordan O'Doherty		End of contract	25 May 2018	
37	MF	(Germany) Daniel Adlung		Mutual contract termination	25 May 2018	
77	FW	(Slovenia) Džengis Čavušević		End of contract	25 May 2018	
22	DF	(Turkey) Ersan Gülüm	Hebei China Fortune	Loan return	31 May 2018	
5	DF	Taylor Regan	(Malaysia) Selangor	$50,000 (paid by player)	9 January 2019	

=== From youth squad ===
N	Pos.	Nat.	Name	Age	Notes
27	MF	(Australia)	Louis D'Arrigo	16	1 year scholarship contract
30	GK	(Australia)	Isaac Richards	19	1 year senior contract
33	FW	(Australia)	Apostolos Stamatelopoulos	19	1 year senior contract
32	FW	(Australia)	Carlo Armiento	19	1 year scholarship contract

=== Contract extensions ===
No.	Name	Position	Duration	Date	Notes
23	Jordan Elsey	Centre back	3 years	2 May 2018	
6	Vince Lia	Defensive midfielder	1 year	4 May 2018	
2	Michael Marrone	Right back	1 year	14 March 2019	
17	Nikola Mileusnic	Winger	2 years	5 April 2019	

=== Technical staff ===
Position	Staff
Head coach	(Germany) Marco Kurz
Assistant coach	(Croatia) Filip Tapalović
Goalkeeper coach	(Australia) Frank Juric
Physiotherapist	(Australia) Nafyn Pattiaratchi

== Squad statistics ==
=== Appearances and goals ===
N	Pos.	Nat.	Name	Total					A-League					A-League Finals Series					FFA Cup
N	Pos.	Nat.	Name	Apps	Goals	Yellow card	Second yellow card	Red card	Apps	Goals	Yellow card	Second yellow card	Red card	Apps	Goals	Yellow card	Second yellow card	Red card	Apps	Goals	Yellow card	Second yellow card	Red card
1	GK	(Australia)	Daniel Margush	0	0	0	0	0	0+0	0	0	0	0	0+0	0	0	0	0	0+0	0	0	0	0
2	DF	(Australia)	Michael Marrone	29	2	5	0	0	17+5	1	3	0	0	2+0	1	1	0	0	2+3	0	1	0	0
3	DF	(Australia)	Scott Galloway	34	1	2	0	0	27+0	1	1	0	0	2+0	0	1	0	0	5+0	0	0	0	0
4	MF	(Australia)	Ryan Strain	26	0	2	0	0	17+5	0	1	0	0	0+0	0	0	0	0	4+0	0	1	0	0
6	MF	(Australia)	Vince Lia	27	1	7	0	0	15+6	1	6	0	0	0+2	0	0	0	0	3+1	0	1	0	0
7	MF	(Australia)	Ryan Kitto	28	2	2	0	0	12+11	1	2	0	0	2+0	1	0	0	0	2+1	0	0	0	0
8	MF	(Spain)	Isaías	34	4	7	0	0	27+0	4	3	0	0	2+0	0	2	0	0	5+0	0	2	0	0
9	FW	(Senegal)	Baba Diawara	6	2	1	0	0	0+2	1	1	0	0	0+2	1	0	0	0	2+0	0	0	0	0
10	FW	(Denmark)	Ken Ilsø	24	3	1	0	1	10+9	3	0	0	1	0+0	0	0	0	0	2+3	0	1	0	0
11	FW	(Australia)	Craig Goodwin	33	15	5	0	0	27+0	10	5	0	0	2+0	0	0	0	0	4+0	5	0	0	0
14	FW	(Australia)	George Blackwood	20	4	1	0	0	10+7	4	0	0	0	2+0	0	0	0	0	1+0	0	1	0	0
16	MF	(Australia)	Nathan Konstandopoulos	18	0	2	0	0	9+7	0	2	0	0	1+0	0	0	0	0	0+1	0	0	0	0
17	FW	(Australia)	Nikola Mileusnic	22	5	0	0	0	11+8	5	0	0	0	1+1	0	0	0	0	0+1	0	0	0	0
18	MF	(Australia)	Lachlan Brook†	0	0	0	0	0	0+0	0	0	0	0	0+0	0	0	0	0	0+0	0	0	0	0
19	FW	(Netherlands)	Jordy Thomassen	8	0	1	0	0	6+2	0	1	0	0	0+0	0	0	0	0	0+0	0	0	0	0
20	GK	(Australia)	Paul Izzo	34	0	2	0	0	27+0	0	1	0	0	2+0	0	0	0	0	5+0	0	1	0	0
22	DF	(Denmark)	Michael Jakobsen	30	0	8	0	0	23+0	0	7	0	0	2+0	0	0	0	0	5+0	0	1	0	0
23	DF	(Australia)	Jordan Elsey	26	2	3	1	0	18+1	0	3	1	0	0+2	0	0	0	0	5+0	2	0	0	0
24	FW	(Burundi)	Pacifique Niyongabire†	0	0	0	0	0	0+0	0	0	0	0	0+0	0	0	0	0	0+0	0	0	0	0
26	MF	(Australia)	Ben Halloran	27	4	3	0	0	20+1	2	1	0	0	2+0	1	1	0	0	3+1	1	1	0	0
27	MF	(Australia)	Louis D'Arrigo†	1	0	0	0	0	0+1	0	0	0	0	0+0	0	0	0	0	0+0	0	0	0	0
28	FW	(Australia)	Kristin Konstandopoulos†	0	0	0	0	0	0+0	0	0	0	0	0+0	0	0	0	0	0+0	0	0	0	0
30	GK	(Australia)	Isaac Richards	0	0	0	0	0	0+0	0	0	0	0	0+0	0	0	0	0	0+0	0	0	0	0
31	MF	(Germany)	Mirko Boland	20	2	5	0	0	12+1	0	3	0	0	2+0	0	1	0	0	5+0	2	1	0	0
32	FW	(Australia)	Carlo Armiento†	5	0	0	0	0	0+5	0	0	0	0	0+0	0	0	0	0	0+0	0	0	0	0
33	FW	(Australia)	Apostolos Stamatelopoulos	12	3	2	0	0	5+2	3	0	0	0	0+1	0	0	0	0	2+2	0	2	0	0
Players no longer at the club
5	DF	(Australia)	Taylor Regan	5	0	1	1	0	3+1	0	1	1	0	0+0	0	0	0	0	0+1	0	0	0	0

- Last updated: 10 May 2019
- Source: au.soccerway.com
- (yellow card) = Number of bookings; (second yellow card) = Number of sending offs after a second yellow card; (red card) = Number of sending offs by a direct red card.

† = Scholarship or NPL/NYL-listed player

== Pre-season and friendlies ==
Win Draw Loss

=== Friendlies ===
10 July 2018	Para Hills Knights (Australia)	0–2	(Australia) Adelaide United	Adelaide
19:00 ACST		Report	N. Konstandopoulos 9'; Irabona 85'	Stadium: The Paddocks; Attendance: ≈500

18 July 2018	Adelaide United (Australia)	2–1	(Australia) West Torrens Birkalla	Adelaide
19:00 ACST	Stamatelopoulos 37'; Armiento 86'	Report	D'Agostino 50'	Stadium: Marden Sports Complex

25 July 2018	Adelaide United (Australia)	2–0	(Australia) Adelaide Olympic	Adelaide
19:00 ACST	Stamatelopoulos 62'; Armiento 90'	Report		Stadium: Marden Sports Complex

10 August 2018	Adelaide United (Australia)	7–0	(Australia) South Adelaide	Adelaide
	Goodwin 23'; Stamatelopoulos 30'; Ilsø 45'; Regan 64'; Kitto 83'; Strain 86', 88'	Report		Stadium: Adelaide United Training Centre; Attendance: 0 (behind closed doors)

16 August 2018	Adelaide United (Australia)	6–0	(Australia) Adelaide Comets	Adelaide
	Stamatelopoulos 6', 45', 74'; Boland 30', 53'; Elsey 78'	Report		Stadium: Adelaide United Training Centre; Attendance: 0 (behind closed doors)

21 August 2018	Adelaide United (Australia)	0–0	(Australia) Melbourne City	Adelaide
		Report		Stadium: Coopers Stadium; Attendance: 0 (behind closed doors)

12 September 2018	Melbourne City (Australia)	2–0	(Australia) Adelaide United	Melbourne
	Wales 12'; Vidošić 16'	Report		Stadium: City Football Academy

19 September 2018	Adelaide United (Australia)	2–2	(Australia) Perth Glory	Adelaide
	Ilsø 45' (pen.); Boland 45+1'	Report	Elsey 11' (o.g.); Mrcela 44'	Stadium: Coopers Stadium; Attendance: 0 (behind closed doors)

12 October 2018	Adelaide United (Australia)	2–1	(Australia) Melbourne Victory	Adelaide
ACST	Strain 72'; Blackwood 84'	Report	Marrone 67' (o.g.)	Stadium: Coopers Stadium

== Competitions ==
=== Overall ===
Competition	Started round	Final position / round	First match	Last match
A-League	—	4th	19 October 2018	25 April 2019
A-League Finals	Elimination-finals	Semi-finals	5 May 2019	10 May 2019
FFA Cup	Round of 32	Champions	1 August 2018	30 October 2018

=== A-League ===
==== League table ====
Pos	Team	Pld	W	D	L	GF	GA	GD	Pts	Qualification
1	Perth Glory	27	18	6	3	56	23	+33	60	Qualification for 2020 AFC Champions League group stage and Finals series (Note: The top two teams enter the Finals series at the semi-finals, while the teams ranked third to sixth enter the Finals series at the elimination-finals.)
2	Sydney FC (C)	27	16	4	7	43	29	+14	52	Qualification for 2020 AFC Champions League group stage and Finals series
3	Melbourne Victory	27	15	5	7	50	32	+18	50	Qualification for 2020 AFC Champions League preliminary round 2 and Finals series
4	Adelaide United	27	12	8	7	37	32	+5	44	Qualification for Finals series
5	Melbourne City	27	11	7	9	39	32	+7	40	Qualification for Finals series
6	Wellington Phoenix (Note: Wellington Phoenix cannot qualify for the AFC Champions League as they are not recognised as an AFC club.)	27	11	7	9	46	43	+3	40	Qualification for Finals series
7	Newcastle Jets	27	10	5	12	40	36	+4	35	
8	Western Sydney Wanderers	27	6	6	15	42	54	−12	24	
9	Brisbane Roar	27	4	6	17	38	71	−33	18	
10	Central Coast Mariners	27	3	4	20	31	70	−39	13	

Source: A-Leagues
Rules for classification: 1) points; 2) goal difference; 3) number of goals scored.
(C) Champions

==== Results summary ====
Overall								Home						Away					
Pld	W	D	L	GF	GA	GD	Pts	W	D	L	GF	GA	GD	W	D	L	GF	GA	GD
27	12	8	7	37	32	+5	44	6	4	4	19	19	0	6	4	3	18	13	+5

Source: ultimatealeague.com

==== Results by round ====
Round	1	2	3	4	5	6	7	8	9	10	11	12	13	14	15	16	17	18	19	20	21	22	23	24	25	26	27
Ground	H	H	A	H	A	H	A	H	H	A	H	H	A	A	A	H	H	A	H	A	A	H	A	H	A	H	A
Result	D	D	W	L	W	W	L	L	D	W	D	W	L	W	D	W	W	D	L	D	L	L	W	W	D	W	W
Position	3	5	3	6	4	4	4	5	6	5	5	5	6	6	5	5	5	4	4	4	6	6	5	5	4	4	4

Source: ultimatealeague.com
A = Away; H = Home; W = Win; D = Draw; L = Loss

==== Matches ====
Win Draw Loss

19 October 2018 1	Adelaide United	1–1	Sydney FC	Adelaide
19:20 ACDT	Galloway 45+3'	Report	Le Fondre 78'	Stadium: Coopers Stadium; Attendance: 10,018; Referee: Jarred Gillett

26 October 2018 2	Adelaide United	1–1	Newcastle Jets	Adelaide
19:20 ACDT	Goodwin 63'	Report	Vargas 52'	Stadium: Coopers Stadium; Attendance: 7,906; Referee: Shaun Evans

4 November 2018 3	Central Coast Mariners	0–3	Adelaide United	Gosford
17:00 AEDT		Report	Goodwin 9', 56'; Stamatelopoulos 16'	Stadium: Central Coast Stadium; Attendance: 6,043; Referee: Alex King

11 November 2018 4	Adelaide United	0–2	Perth Glory	Adelaide
16:30 ACDT		Report	Keogh 76'; Ikonomidis 90'	Stadium: Coopers Stadium; Attendance: 9,705; Referee: Chris Beath

24 November 2018 5	Wellington Phoenix	1–3	Adelaide United	Wellington
19:35 NZDT	Mandi 14'	Report	Doyle 45' (o.g.); Ilsø 47', 65'	Stadium: Westpac Stadium; Attendance: 4,831; Referee: Kurt Ams

30 November 2018 6	Adelaide United	2–1	Brisbane Roar	Adelaide
19:20 ACDT	Halloran 43', 49'	Report	Henrique 67'	Stadium: Coopers Stadium; Attendance: 8,005; Referee: Jarred Gillett

8 December 2018 7	Melbourne Victory	2–0	Adelaide United	Melbourne
19:50 AEDT	Barbarouses 62'; Toivonen 81'	Report		Stadium: Marvel Stadium; Attendance: 20,629; Referee: Shaun Evans

16 December 2018 8	Adelaide United	0–2	Melbourne City	Adelaide
18:30 ACDT		Report	Elsey 25' (o.g.); Brattan 50'	Stadium: Coopers Stadium; Attendance: 8,504; Referee: Chris Beath

26 December 2018 9	Adelaide United	2–2	Western Sydney Wanderers	Adelaide
19:20 ACDT	Mileusnic 48', 55'	Report	Riera 45+1'; Kamau 61'	Stadium: Coopers Stadium; Attendance: 8,003; Referee: Peter Green

30 December 2018 10	Newcastle Jets	1–2	Adelaide United	Newcastle
19:00 AEDT	O'Donovan 75'	Report	Mileusnic 38'; Goodwin 90+1' (pen.)	Stadium: McDonald Jones Stadium; Attendance: 9,005; Referee: Jarred Gillett

5 January 2019 11	Adelaide United	0–0	Wellington Phoenix	Adelaide
17:05 ACDT		Report		Stadium: Coopers Stadium; Attendance: 8,954; Referee: Stephan Lucas

9 January 2019 12	Adelaide United	2–0	Melbourne Victory	Adelaide
19:20 ACDT	Goodwin 18'; Ilsø 21'	Report		Stadium: Coopers Stadium; Attendance: 12,115; Referee: Shaun Evans

13 January 2019 13	Sydney FC	2–1	Adelaide United	Sydney
18:00 AEDT	de Jong 13'; Tratt 48'	Report	Goodwin 50' (pen.)	Stadium: Jubilee Oval; Attendance: 11,560; Referee: Adam Kersey

18 January 2019 14	Western Sydney Wanderers	1–2	Adelaide United	Sydney
19:50 AEDT	Bonevacia 49'	Report	Lia 8'; Goodwin 66'	Stadium: ANZ Stadium; Attendance: 7,104; Referee: Alex King

23 January 2019 15	Perth Glory	0–0	Adelaide United	Perth
19:00 AWST		Report		Stadium: HBF Park; Attendance: 7,123; Referee: Adam Kersey

27 January 2019 16	Adelaide United	2–1	Central Coast Mariners	Adelaide
17:30 ACDT	Isaías 66'; Blackwood 90+2'	Report	Hoole 37'	Stadium: Coopers Stadium; Attendance: 7,965; Referee: Jarred Gillett

2 February 2019 17	Adelaide United	4–3	Brisbane Roar	Adelaide
19:20 ACDT	Isaías 45+2'; Goodwin 67'; Blackwood 75'; Mileusnic 90+7'	Report	Henrique 19'; Wenzel-Halls 38'; Taggart 43'	Stadium: Coopers Stadium; Attendance: 7,071; Referee: Alex King

9 February 2019 18	Melbourne City	1–1	Adelaide United	Melbourne
19:50 AEDT	Maclaren 69'	Report	Goodwin 43'	Stadium: AAMI Park; Attendance: 6,569; Referee: Peter Green

16 February 2019 19	Adelaide United	1–3	Western Sydney Wanderers	Adelaide
19:20 ACDT	Kitto 44'	Report	Riera 12'; Bonevacia 54'; Majok 71'	Stadium: Coopers Stadium; Attendance: 8,880; Referee: Daniel Elder

24 February 2019 20	Newcastle Jets	0–0	Adelaide United	Newcastle
17:00 AEDT		Report		Stadium: McDonald Jones Stadium; Attendance: 8,912; Referee: Adam Fielding

1 March 2019 21	Sydney FC	2–0	Adelaide United	Sydney
19:50 AEDT	Reza 15'; Devlin 90'	Report		Stadium: Leichhardt Oval; Referee: Kurt Ams

15 March 2019 22	Adelaide United	0–2	Perth Glory	Adelaide
19:20 ACDT		Report	Castro 35'; Keogh 70'	Stadium: Coopers Stadium; Attendance: 7,853; Referee: Peter Green

31 March 2019 23	Central Coast Mariners	0–1	Adelaide United	Gosford
17:00 AEDT		Report	Isaías 35'	Stadium: Central Coast Stadium; Attendance: 4,683; Referee: Kurt Ams

7 April 2019 24	Adelaide United	3–1	Wellington Phoenix	Adelaide
16:30 ACST	Marrone 10'; Stamatelopoulos 17', 44'	Report	Sheridan 73'	Stadium: Coopers Stadium; Attendance: 8,343; Referee: Jonathan Barreiro

13 April 2019 25	Melbourne City	0–0	Adelaide United	Melbourne
17:35 AEST		Report		Stadium: AAMI Park; Attendance: 7,720; Referee: Alex King

19 April 2019 26	Adelaide United	1–0	Melbourne Victory	Adelaide
19:20 ACST	Blackwood 81'	Report		Stadium: Coopers Stadium; Attendance: 12,866; Referee: Peter Green

25 April 2019 27	Brisbane Roar	3–5	Adelaide United	Brisbane
14:00 AEST	Wenzel-Halls 35'; D'Agostino 45'; Bauthéac 61' (pen.)	Report	Mileusnic 4'; Blackwood 51'; Goodwin 71'; Diawara 76'; Isaías 85'	Stadium: Suncorp Stadium; Attendance: 11,790; Referee: Shaun Evans

==== Finals series ====
5 May 2019 Elimination-final	Adelaide United	1–0 (a.e.t.)	Melbourne City	Adelaide
18:30 ACST	Halloran 119'	Report		Stadium: Coopers Stadium; Attendance: 13,232; Referee: Kurt Ams

10 May 2019 Semi-final	Perth Glory	3–3 (a.e.t.) (5–4 p)	Adelaide United	Perth
18:30 AWST	Castro 29', 74'; Neville 104'	Report	Diawara 81'; Ryan Kitto 90+4'; Marrone 115'	Stadium: HBF Park; Attendance: 17,868; Referee: Alex King
	Penalties
	(penalty scored) Juande; (penalty missed) Castro; (penalty scored) Santalab; (penalty scored) Reddy; (penalty scored) Brimmer; (penalty missed) Davidson; (penalty missed) Lowry; (penalty scored) Chianese		(penalty scored) Goodwin; (penalty scored) Elsey; (penalty scored) Lia; (penalty missed) Sanchez; (penalty scored) Halloran; (penalty missed) Diawara; (penalty missed) Mileusnic; (penalty missed) Konstandopoulos

=== FFA Cup ===
1 August 2018 Round of 32	Adelaide United	3–0	Central Coast Mariners	Adelaide
19:00 ACST	Elsey 12'; Boland 19'; Goodwin 53'	Report		Stadium: Marden Sports Complex; Attendance: 3,107; Referee: Shaun Evans

29 August 2018 Round of 16	Queensland Lions	0–1	Adelaide United	Brisbane
7:00 ACST		Report	Goodwin 31'	Stadium: Perry Park; Attendance: 1,774; Referee: Peter Green

26 September 2018 Quarter-Final	APIA Leichhardt Tigers	0–2	Adelaide United	Sydney
7:00 ACST		Report	Goodwin 71'; Boland 80'	Stadium: Leichhardt Oval; Attendance: 1,823; Referee: Kurt Ams

5 October 2018 Semi-final	Bentleigh Greens	0–2	Adelaide United	Melbourne
19:30 AEDT		Report	Halloran 21'; Elsey 49'	Stadium: Kingston Heath Complex; Attendance: 2,416; Referee: Chris Beath

30 October 2018 Final	Adelaide United	2–1	Sydney FC	Adelaide
19:00 ACDT	Goodwin 25', 74'	Report	Le Fondre 28' (pen.)	Stadium: Coopers Stadium; Attendance: 14,448; Referee: Jarred Gillett
