= Lachlan Brook =

Australian soccer player (born 2001)

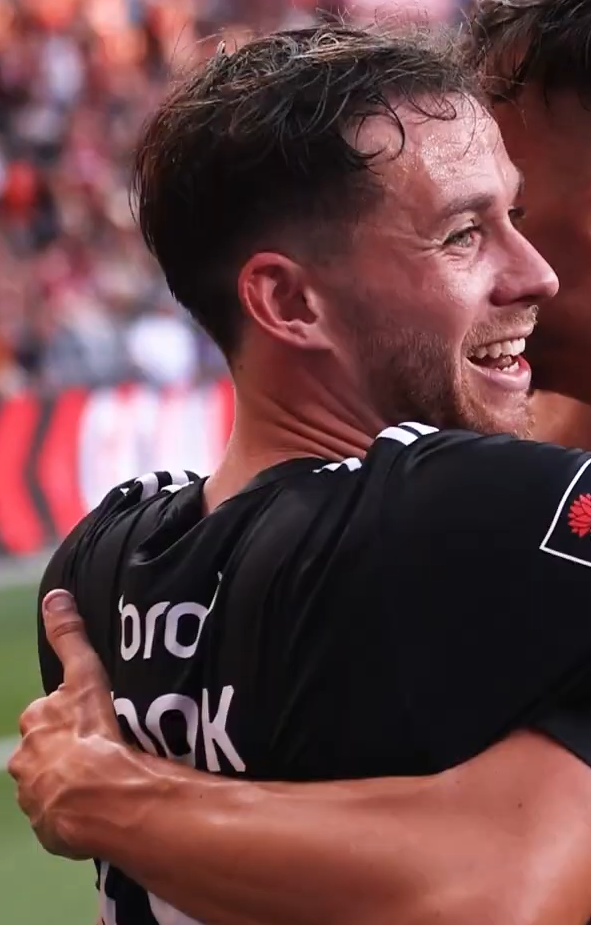
- Brook playing for Western Sydney Wanderers in 2023

Personal information
- Full name: Lachlan Ricky Brook
- Date of birth: 8 February 2001 (age 25)
- Place of birth: Gawler, South Australia, Australia
- Height: 1.78 m (5 ft 10 in)
- Position: Winger

Team information
- Current team: Auckland FC
- Number: 77

Youth career
- Gawler Eagles
- Para Hills Knights
- Adelaide Raiders
- SA NTC
- FFA CoE
- 2016–2017: Adelaide United

Senior career*
Years	Team	Apps	(Gls)
2017–2020	Adelaide United NPL	39	(15)
2017–2020	Adelaide United	8	(1)
2020–2023	Brentford	0	(0)
2022	→ Adelaide United (loan)	16	(0)
2022–2023	→ Crewe Alexandra (loan)	34	(3)
2023–2024	Western Sydney Wanderers	23	(9)
2024–2025	Real Salt Lake	12	(0)
2025	Real Monarchs	4	(0)
2025–	Auckland FC	28	(9)

International career
2016–2017	Australia U17	16	(10)
2019–2021	Australia U20	6	(3)
2019–2024	Australia U23	17	(2)
Medal record
Men's football
Representing Australia
WAFF U-23 Championship
Runner-up	2024 Saudi Arabia
AFF U-19 Youth Championship
Winner	2019 Vietnam	U-20 Team
AFF U-16 Youth Championship
Winner	2016 Cambodia	U-17 Team
Bronze medal – third place	2015 Cambodia	U-17 Team
- * Club domestic league appearances and goals as of 21:04, 10 May 2026 (UTC)

Lachlan Ricky Brook (born 8 February 2001) is an Australian professional soccer player who plays as a winger for A-League Men club Auckland FC.

Brook is a product of the Adelaide United youth system and made his professional debut for the club in 2017. He transferred to English club Brentford in 2020 and gained competitive experience of English football on loan with Crewe Alexandra during the 2022–23 season. He returned to his native Australia with Western Sydney Wanderers in 2023, before transferring to Major League Soccer club Real Salt Lake in 2024. After a spell on the fringe, Brook returned to the A-League with Auckland FC in 2025. Brook was capped by Australia at youth level.

== Club career ==
=== Adelaide United ===
Able to play across the forward line, Brook began his youth career with spells at Gawler Eagles, Para Hills Knights, FFSA NTC, FFA Centre of Excellence, Adelaide Raiders SC and he joined the youth system at A-League club Adelaide United in November 2016. His progression was such that he was included in the first team squad for the Reds' final 2017 AFC Champions League group stage match versus Jiangsu Suning on 9 May 2017. Brook made his professional debut as a substitute for Riley McGree in the dying minutes of the 1–0 defeat.

Brook spent much of the 2017–18, 2018–19 and 2019–20 seasons playing for the Adelaide United youth teams, but he made 9 first team appearances during the period, which included a substitute cameo late in the 4–0 2019 FFA Cup Final victory over Melbourne City. His only senior goal for the club came in a 5–3 A-League win over Perth Glory on 30 July 2020. For his performances during the 2019–20 season, Brook shared the Adelaide United Youth Player of the Year award with Taras Gomulka. Despite having signed a new two-year contract in June 2020, Brook departed the Hindmarsh Stadium in October 2020.

=== Brentford ===
On 5 October 2020, Brook moved to England to join the B team at Championship club Brentford on a three-year contract, with the option of a further year, for an undisclosed fee. He played exclusively B team football until January 2022, when he rejoined Adelaide United on loan until the end of the 2021–22 season. He made 19 appearances during the second half of a 2021–22 season which concluded with defeat at the semi-final stage of the 2022 A-League Men Finals.

Brook played the final year of his Brentford contract on loan at League Two club Crewe Alexandra. On the opening day of the 2022–23 season, Brook scored what proved to be the winner on his competitive debut in English football, in a 2–1 victory over Rochdale at Spotland. His run in the team was ended by an ankle injury suffered during a 2–2 draw with Northampton Town on 20 August 2022 and he returned to match play one month later. He made 34 appearances and scored three goals during a mid-table season.

=== Western Sydney Wanderers ===
On 15 June 2023, Brook signed a two-year contract with A-League Men club Western Sydney Wanderers on a free transfer. He made 25 appearances and joint-top scored 14 goals for the club during the 2023–24 season, with five of the goals coming on his debut, in a 6–1 Australia Cup round-of-32 win over Floreat Athena on 9 August 2023. Brook departed the club in July 2024.

=== Real Salt Lake ===
On 23 July 2024, Brook transferred to Major League Soccer club Real Salt Lake and he signed an 18 month contract, with options for two further years, for an undisclosed fee. He made 7 appearances during the remainder of the 2024 season, which concluded with defeat in the first round of the MLS Cup playoffs. Brook was again on the fringe during the 2025 season, making just 11 appearances for the club and its feeder, Real Monarchs. His contract was terminated by mutual consent on 29 July 2025.

=== Auckland FC ===
On 6 August 2025, Brook signed with A-League club Auckland FC on an undisclosed-length contract. On 23 August, he made his debut for the club in a 3–0 win over South Melbourne FC in the Australia Cup. In the following match, Brook scored his first goal for the club in a 1–1 draw with Sydney FC, with Auckland later winning on penalties. On 23 November, he scored his first A-League goal for the club with a direct free kick in a 1–1 draw against Brisbane Roar. Brook finished the regular season with eight goals and one assist in 26 appearances. He scored his first A-League Men finals goal for Auckland FC in a 1–1 draw with his former club Adelaide United, converting after Cameron Howieson's initial effort was scuffed.

== International career ==
Brook was capped by Australia at youth level. He was a part of the 2019 AFF U18 Youth Championship-winning squad and scored the only goal of the Final versus Malaysia. Brook made his U23 debut as a half time substitute during a 1–1 friendly draw with New Zealand on 6 September 2019. More than two years later, he won his second call-up for two 2022 AFC U23 Asian Cup qualifiers versus Indonesia, both of which he appeared in. Brook was a member of the Australia squads at the 2022 AFC U23 Asian Cup, the 2024 WAFF U23 Championship and the 2024 AFC U23 Asian Cup and appeared at each tournament. He was named in the 2023 Maurice Revello Tournament squad, but was later ruled out of the competition with injury.

== Career statistics ==
As of 10 May 2026

Appearances and goals by club, season and competition
Club	Season	League			National cup (Note: Includes Australia Cup, FA Cup)		League cup (Note: Includes EFL Cup)		Continental		Other		Total	
Club	Season	Division	Apps	Goals	Apps	Goals	Apps	Goals	Apps	Goals	Apps	Goals	Apps	Goals
Adelaide United Youth	2017	NPL SA	13	3	―		―		―		―		13	3
Adelaide United Youth	2018	NPL SA	14	9	―		―		―		2 (Note: Appearances in National Premier Leagues South Australia Finals)	0	16	9
Adelaide United Youth	2019	NPL SA	6	1	―		―		―		―		6	1
Adelaide United Youth	2020	NPL SA	4	2	―		―		―		―		4	2
Adelaide United Youth	Total		37	15	―		―		―		2	0	39	15
Adelaide United	2016–17	A-League	0	0	0	0	―		1 (Note: Appearance in AFC Champions League)	0	―		1	0
Adelaide United	2017–18	A-League	1	0	0	0	―		―		0	0	1	0
Adelaide United	2019–20	A-League	7	1	1	0	―		―		―		8	1
Adelaide United	Total		8	1	1	0	―		1	0	0	0	10	1
Brentford	2020–21	Championship	0	0	0	0	0	0	―		0	0	0	0
Adelaide United (loan)	2021–22	A-League Men	16	0	―		―		―		3 (Note: Appearance in A-League Men Finals)	0	19	0
Crewe Alexandra (loan)	2022–23	League Two	34	3	2	0	0	0	―		2 (Note: Appearances in EFL Trophy)	0	38	3
Crewe Alexandra (loan)	Total		50	3	2	0	―		0	0	6	0	57	3
Western Sydney Wanderers	2023–24	A-League Men	23	9	2	5	―		―		―		25	14
Western Sydney Wanderers	Total		23	9	2	5	―		―		―		25	14
Real Salt Lake	2024	Major League Soccer	7	0	―		―		―		0	0	7	0
Real Salt Lake	2025	Major League Soccer	5	0	0	0	―		2 (Note: Appearances in CONCACAF Champions Cup)	0	0	0	7	0
Real Salt Lake	Total		12	0	0	0	―		2	0	0	0	14	0
Real Monarchs	2025	MLS Next Pro	4	0	―		―		―		―		4	0
Real Monarchs	Total		4	0	0	0	―		―		―		4	0
Auckland FC	2025–26	A-League Men	26	8	3	1	―		―		3	1	31	10
Auckland FC	2026–27	A-League Men	0	0	―		―		1 (Note: Appearance in FIFA Intercontinental Cup)	0	0	0	1	0
Auckland FC	Total		26	8	3	1	―		1	0	3	1	32	10
Career total			160	36	8	6	0	0	4	0	11	1	182	43

== Honours ==
=== Player ===
Adelaide United

- FFA Cup: 2019

Australia U-23

- WAFF U-23 Championship: runner-up 2024

Australia U20

- AFF U19 Youth Championship: 2019

Australia U17

- AFF U16 Youth Championship: 2016

Auckland FC

- A-League Men Championship: 2026

Individual

- Adelaide United Youth Player of the Year: 2019–20 (shared)
