= Ryan Kitto =

Australian soccer player

Personal information
- Full name: Ryan Kitto
- Date of birth: 9 August 1994 (age 32)
- Place of birth: McLaren Flat, Australia
- Height: 1.79 m (5 ft 10 in)
- Position: Left back

Team information
- Current team: Adelaide United
- Number: 7

Youth career
- –2011: West Torrens Birkalla
- 2013–2014: Adelaide United

Senior career*
Years	Team	Apps	(Gls)
2011–2014	West Torrens Birkalla	34	(6)
2013–2015	Adelaide United	2	(0)
2015	West Torrens Birkalla	28	(17)
2015–2016	Newcastle Jets	18	(2)
2016–	Adelaide United	235	(20)

International career^{‡}
2014	Australia U23	2	(1)
- * Club domestic league appearances and goals as of 18 January 2026 ‡ National team caps and goals as of 16 September 2015

Ryan Kitto is an Australian soccer player who plays as a left back for Adelaide United. He is currently the third most capped player for Adelaide United and was formerly a captain of the club.

== Career ==
=== Adelaide United ===
Kitto started his career with West Torrens Birkalla, before signing for A-League club Adelaide United. He made his debut on 26 October 2013 for Adelaide United against Central Coast Mariners.

=== West Torrens Birkalla ===
In February 2015 returned to his home club West Torrens Birkalla. Kitto was awarded the 2015 Sergio Melta Medal (Player of the Year) after the 2015 NPL SA season making 28 appearances and scoring 17 goals.

=== Newcastle Jets ===
Kitto signed his second professional A-League deal with the Newcastle Jets as an injury replacement player following a successful trial with the club. Kitto made his Newcastle debut in Round 7 of the 2015–16 A-League season, coming on for Nigel Boogaard in the 82nd minute in a 0–0 draw against Adelaide United.

Ktto had one of his best career games in the final match of the 2015–16 A-League season against Central Coast Mariners, getting a hat-trick of assists.

=== Return to Adelaide United ===
On 23 May 2016, Kitto returned to Adelaide United. He started in Adelaide's first match of the 2016 FFA Cup on 2 August, and scored Adelaide's only goal in a 2–1 loss to Queensland state league side Redlands United in Brisbane.

Kitto has won the FFA Cup two times with Adelaide United; the first final ending in a 2–1 victory over Sydney FC, and the second in a 4–0 victory over Melbourne City FC.

Following the departure of Craig Goodwin, Kitto was made captain of Adelaide United for the 2023-24 season. He captained the club across two seasons but stepped down once Goodwin returned to the club. One of his finest moments came in the 2025-26 Original Rivalry against Melbourne Victory at Hindmarsh Stadium when Kitto scored a winning header in extra time.

== Career statistics ==
=== Club ===
As of match played 17 January 2026

Appearances and goals by club, season and competition
Club	Season	League (Note: Includes A-League finals series)			Cup (Note: Includes Australia Cup)		Continental (Note: Includes AFC Champions League)		Total	
Club	Season	Division	Apps	Goals	Apps	Goals	Apps	Goals	Apps	Goals
West Torrens Birkalla	2011	FFSA Super League	2	0	1	0	—		3	0
West Torrens Birkalla	2012	FFSA Super League	6	0	0	0	—		6	0
West Torrens Birkalla	2013	NPL SA	26	6	2	0	—		28	6
West Torrens Birkalla	Total		34	6	3	0	0	0	37	6
Adelaide United	2013–14	A-League	2	0	0	0	—		2	0
West Torrens Birkalla	2015	NPL SA	28	17	1	0	–		29	17
Newcastle Jets	2015–16	A-League	18	2	0	0	—		18	2
Adelaide United	2016–17	A-League	16	0	1	1	1	0	18	1
Adelaide United	2017–18	A-League	24	7	3	0	—		27	7
Adelaide United	2018–19	A-League	25	2	3	0	—		28	2
Adelaide United	2019–20	A-League	22	0	5	0	—		27	0
Adelaide United	2020–21	A-League	15	0	0	0	—		15	0
Adelaide United	2021–22	A-League Men	27	1	3	0	—		30	1
Adelaide United	2022–23	A-League Men	28	6	2	0	—		30	6
Adelaide United	2023–24	A-League Men	26	0	4	1	—		30	1
Adelaide United	2024–25	A-League Men	20	1	0	0	—		20	1
Adelaide United	2025–26	A-League Men	12	2	0	0	—		12	2
Adelaide United	Total		212	18	21	2	1	0	233	20
Career Total			294	43	25	2	1	0	320	45
