= George Blackwood =

Australian footballer (born 1997)

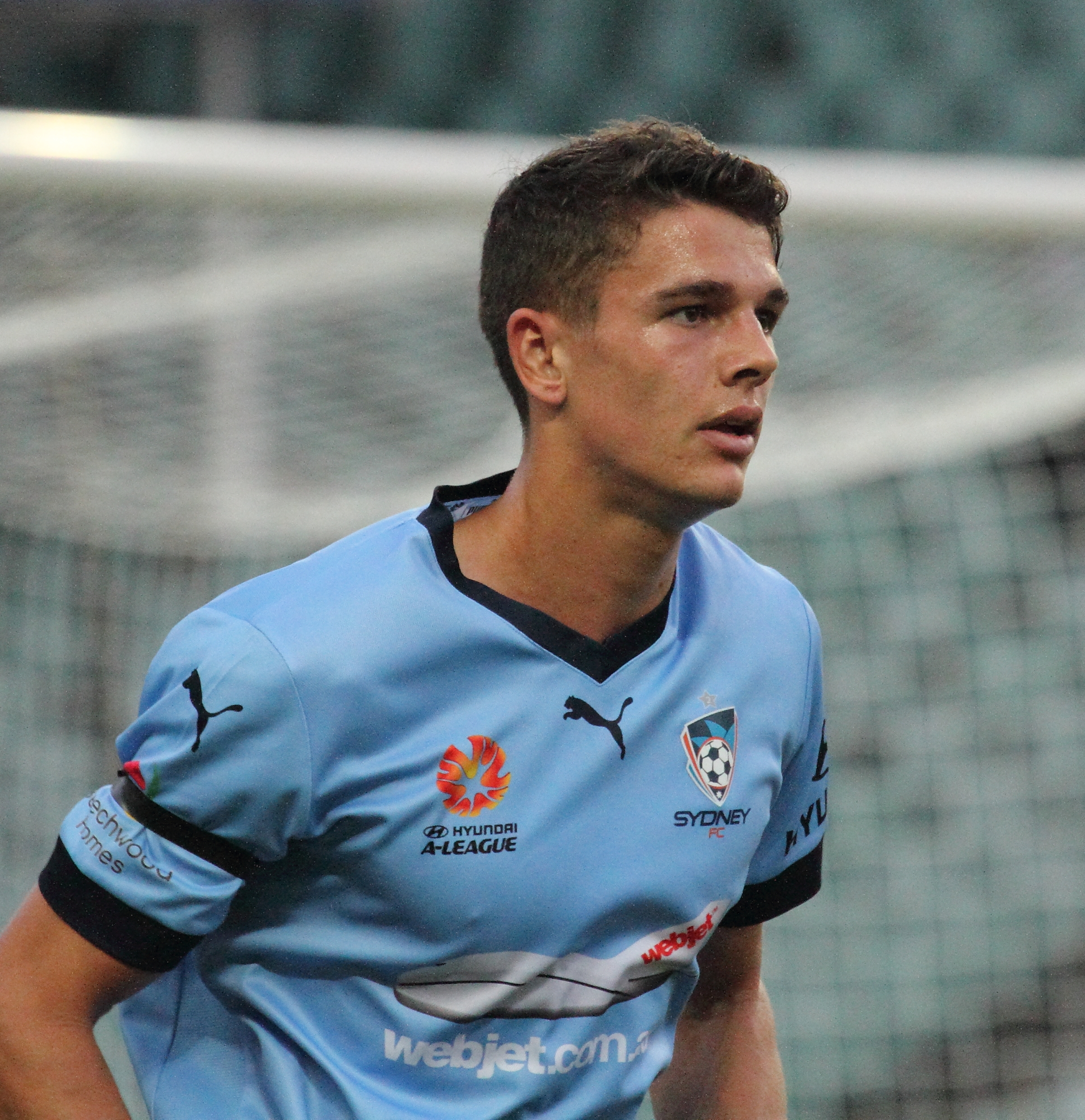

Personal information
- Full name: George Henry Raymond Blackwood
- Date of birth: 4 June 1997 (age 29)
- Place of birth: Berowra, Australia
- Height: 1.88 m (6 ft 2 in)
- Position: Striker

Youth career
- –2014: APIA Leichhardt
- 2014: Sydney FC

Senior career*
| Years | Team | Apps | (Gls) |
| 2014–2017 | Sydney FC | 19 | (1) |
| 2017–2020 | Adelaide United | 64 | (13) |
| 2020–2021 | Oldham Athletic | 13 | (3) |
| 2021–2023 | Adelaide United | 36 | (7) |
| 2023 | Bhayangkara | 1 | (0) |
| 2024 | Balzan | 13 | (4) |
| 2025– | West Torrens Birkalla | 12 | (14) |

International career
| 2014–2015 | Australia U20 | 16 | (7) |
| 2015–2019 | Australia U23 | 11 | (5) |
Medal record
Men's football
Representing Australia
AFF U-19 Youth Championship
| First place | 2016 Vietnam | U-20 Team |
- * Club domestic league appearances and goals as of 6 June 2026

George Henry Raymond Blackwood (born 4 June 1997) is an Australian footballer who plays as a striker for West Torrens Birkalla.

Born in Sydney, Blackwood played youth football for APIA Leichhardt Tigers before making his professional debut for Sydney FC in 2014.

Blackwood has represented Australia at under-20 and at under-23 level.

== Club career ==
=== Early career ===
Blackwood spent a month training at Colchester United in 2013 after winning a scholarship award in Australia.

=== Sydney FC ===
George was first called up to Sydney FC's senior squad for a match against Melbourne City in October 2014. He scored his first goal for the club in a draw against Central Coast Mariners on 16 March 2016 with a shot from outside the box. Blackwood denied a new contract from Sydney FC at the end of the 2016–17 season.

=== Adelaide United ===
In July 2017, Adelaide United signed Blackwood. Blackwood's first professional goal for the Adelaide-based club came from a penalty in the Round of 16 of the 2017 FFA Cup against rivals Melbourne Victory. Blackwood made an appearance in the 2017 FFA Cup Final on 21 November 2017 against former club Sydney FC, coming on as a substitute in the 73rd minute. Blackwood was released by the club on 26 August 2020 to pursue a new opportunity

=== Oldham Athletic ===
On 6 September 2020, Blackwood signed with Oldham Athletic on a two-year deal. Blackwood scored his first goal for Oldham on 3 November 2020 which saw the team go on to win the game 2–1. Blackwood developed a fracture in his back which saw a lack of appearances for the English club. Following the conclusion of the 2020–21 EFL League Two season, the club had announced that they had mutually agreed to terminate his contract, Blackwood then returned to Australia.

=== Return to Adelaide United ===
Blackwood returned to Adelaide United on 2 August 2021 signing a two-year deal. In his first game back for the club, Blackwood dispatched a penalty in a Round of 32 match of the 2021 FFA Cup against Floreat Athena.

Following a poor season Blackwood was released by the club on the 4th of July 2023. He was unable to find any clubs in Australia interested in signing him and departed for Indonesia.

=== Bhayangkara FC ===
On 9 November 2023, Blackwood joins Bhayangkara FC in Liga 1. On the same day, he made his debut in a 1–1 draw against Rans Nusantara, coming substitute for Sani Rizki Fauzi in the 67th minute.

Blackwood was released from his contract shortly after his debut.

=== Balzan FC ===
Having been released by Bhayangkara FC almost as soon as his contract began, Blackwood failed to find a new contract within Indonesia or back home in Australia. In January 2024, it was announced that he had signed for Maltese Premier League club Balzan F.C. Blackwood's contract was not extended and was terminated from Balzan in July 2024.

== International career ==
Blackwood was first selected for the Australian under-20 team for the 2014 AFF U-19 Youth Championship in September 2014.

In March 2015, Blackwood was called up to the Australian under-23 team to replace injured Sydney FC teammate Terry Antonis for 2016 AFC U-23 Championship qualification.

== Career statistics ==
=== Club ===
As of 21 May 2023

Appearances and goals by club, season and competition
| Club | Season | League | | | Cup | | Continental | | Total | |
| Club | Season | Division | Apps | Goals | Apps | Goals | Apps | Goals | Apps | Goals |
|---|---|---|---|---|---|---|---|---|---|---|
| Sydney FC | 2014–15 | A-League | 3 | 0 | 0 | 0 | 0 | 0 | 3 | 0 |
| Sydney FC | 2015–16 | A-League | 14 | 1 | 0 | 0 | 6 | 0 | 20 | 1 |
| Sydney FC | 2016–17 | A-League | 2 | 0 | 1 | 0 | 0 | 0 | 3 | 0 |
| Sydney FC | Sydney FC total | | 19 | 1 | 1 | 0 | 6 | 0 | 26 | 1 |
| Adelaide United | 2017–18 | A-League | 24 | 5 | 5 | 1 | 0 | 0 | 29 | 6 |
| Adelaide United | 2018–19 | A-League | 19 | 4 | 1 | 0 | 0 | 0 | 20 | 4 |
| Adelaide United | 2019–20 | A-League | 21 | 4 | 2 | 2 | 0 | 0 | 23 | 6 |
| Adelaide United | Adelaide total | | 64 | 13 | 8 | 3 | 0 | 0 | 72 | 16 |
| Oldham Athletic | 2020–21 | League Two | 13 | 3 | 2 | 0 | 0 | 0 | 15 | 3 |
| Adelaide United | 2021–22 | A-League Men | 17 | 5 | 2 | 1 | 0 | 0 | 19 | 6 |
| Adelaide United | 2022–23 | A-League Men | 19 | 2 | 3 | 1 | 0 | 0 | 22 | 3 |
| Adelaide United | Adelaide total | | 36 | 7 | 5 | 2 | 0 | 0 | 41 | 9 |
| Career total | | | 132 | 24 | 16 | 5 | 6 | 0 | 154 | 29 |

== Honours ==
=== Club ===
Sydney FC

- A-League Premiership: 2016–17

=== Country ===
Australia

- AFF U-19 Youth Championship: 2016

=== Individual ===
- National Youth League Player of the Year: 2014–15
- AFF U-19 Youth Championship Golden Boot: 2016
