= Baba Diawara =

Senegalese footballer (born 1988)

Personal information
- Full name: Papa Babacar Diawara
- Date of birth: 5 January 1988 (age 38)
- Place of birth: Dakar, Senegal
- Height: 1.82 m (6 ft 0 in)
- Position: Striker

Senior career*
Years	Team	Apps	(Gls)
2006–2007	Jeanne d´Arc	24	(9)
2007–2008	Marítimo B	23	(6)
2008–2012	Marítimo	103	(37)
2012–2015	Sevilla	30	(3)
2013–2014	→ Levante (loan)	20	(3)
2014–2015	→ Getafe (loan)	21	(1)
2015–2016	Marítimo	25	(4)
2017–2019	Adelaide United	23	(7)
2019–2020	Mohun Bagan	12	(10)
2021	Punjab	9	(5)
Total		290	(85)
- * Club domestic league appearances and goals

Papa Babacar "Baba" Diawara (born 5 January 1988) is a Senegalese former professional footballer who played as a striker.

== Club career ==
=== Marítimo ===
Born in Dakar, Diawara started his career with Senegal Premier League club ASC Jeanne d'Arc, moving to Europe aged just 19 to sign for C.S. Marítimo in Portugal due to his friendship with former footballer Paul Tisdale. Having risen to prominence in their reserves, he made his debut for the main squad late into the 2007–08 season, appearing in the second half of a 1–1 Primeira Liga home draw against C.F. Estrela da Amadora.

Promoted to the first team the following summer, Diawara scored ten goals in the 2008–09 campaign from 25 league games. His form attracted the attention of several clubs, including Sporting CP, Olympiacos F.C. from Greece and Scotland's Heart of Midlothian, with the latter however being put off by Marítimo's £2.5 million (€2.75 million) valuation of the player.

Diawara bettered his individual totals to 11 goals in 2010–11, with Marítimo finishing in ninth position. Celtic came close to signing him in August 2011, but the deal collapsed on the last day of the transfer window due to visa issues.

Diawara netted ten goals in only 15 matches in the first half of the 2011–12 season, including the last-minute winner at Sporting in a 3–2 win.

=== Sevilla ===
Diawara signed with Sevilla FC on 17 January 2012, penning a 4 1/2-year contract. He made his La Liga debut on the 29th, coming on as a substitute for José Antonio Reyes late into the first half of a 2–1 loss at Málaga CF. His first goal came on 3 March, starting the first time due to Álvaro Negredo's injury and equalising in a 1–1 draw against Atlético Madrid at the Ramón Sánchez-Pizjuán Stadium.

On 17 April 2012, Diawara scored the opening goal in the new National Stadium in Warsaw, during a friendly with local Legia Warsaw, adding another in a 2–0 win. He netted twice on 5 May as Sevilla won 5–2 in their final home match of the season, against Rayo Vallecano. In the following campaign he did not find the net in the league, featuring mainly from the bench.

In July 2013, Diawara was one of three Sevilla players deemed surplus to requirements by coach Unai Emery. On 19 August, he was loaned to fellow Spaniards Levante UD for the duration of 2013–14.

=== Adelaide United ===
In February 2017, after one and a half seasons with former club Marítimo, Diawara joined Adelaide United FC in the Australian A-League. He scored three goals in only seven matches in his first season (five in all competitions), the first coming on 19 March in the 2–1 home defeat of Brisbane Roar FC.

Diawara agreed to a new two-year deal on 11 May 2017.

=== Mohun Bagan ===
In December 2019, Diawara signed a one-year contract with India's Mohun Bagan AC. He scored his first I-League goal for his new team the following 19 January, heading home from a corner kick in the 65th minute to help the hosts defeat East Bengal FC 2–1.

=== Punjab ===
Diawara joined Punjab FC of the same country and league on 1 February 2021. On his debut eight days later, he scored twice in a 2–1 away victory over Indian Arrows.

== Career statistics ==
Club	Season	League			Cup		League Cup		Continental		Total	
Club	Season	Division	Apps	Goals	Apps	Goals	Apps	Goals	Apps	Goals	Apps	Goals
Marítimo	2007–08	Primeira Liga	4	0	0	0	—		—		4	0
Marítimo	2008–09	Primeira Liga	25	10	2	0	2	0	—		29	10
Marítimo	2009–10	Primeira Liga	30	6	3	2	2	1	—		35	9
Marítimo	2010–11	Primeira Liga	29	11	2	1	1	0	6	2	38	14
Marítimo	2011–12	Primeira Liga	15	10	4	1	3	4	—		22	15
Marítimo	Total		103	37	11	4	8	5	6	2	128	48
Sevilla	2011–12	La Liga	11	3	0	0	—		—		11	3
Sevilla	2012–13	La Liga	19	0	4	1	—		—		23	1
Sevilla	Total		30	3	4	1	0	0	0	0	34	4
Levante (loan)	2013–14	La Liga	20	3	0	0	—		—		20	3
Getafe (loan)	2014–15	La Liga	21	1	2	0	—		—		23	1
Marítimo	2015–16	Primeira Liga	16	4	0	0	3	1	—		19	5
Marítimo	2016–17	Primeira Liga	9	0	1	0	0	0	—		10	0
Marítimo	Total		25	4	1	0	3	1	0	0	29	5
Adelaide United	2016–17	A-League	7	3	—		—		6	2	13	5
Adelaide United	2017–18	A-League	12	2	5	0	—		—		17	2
Adelaide United	2018–19	A-League	4	2	2	0	—		—		6	2
Adelaide United	Total		23	7	7	0	0	0	6	2	36	9
Mohun Bagan	2019–20	I-League	12	10	—		—		—		12	10
Punjab	2020–21	I-League	9	5	—		—		—		9	5
Career Total			243	70	2	5	11	6	12	4	291	85

== Honours ==
Mohun Bagan

- I-League: 2019–20
