= Mirko Boland =

German footballer

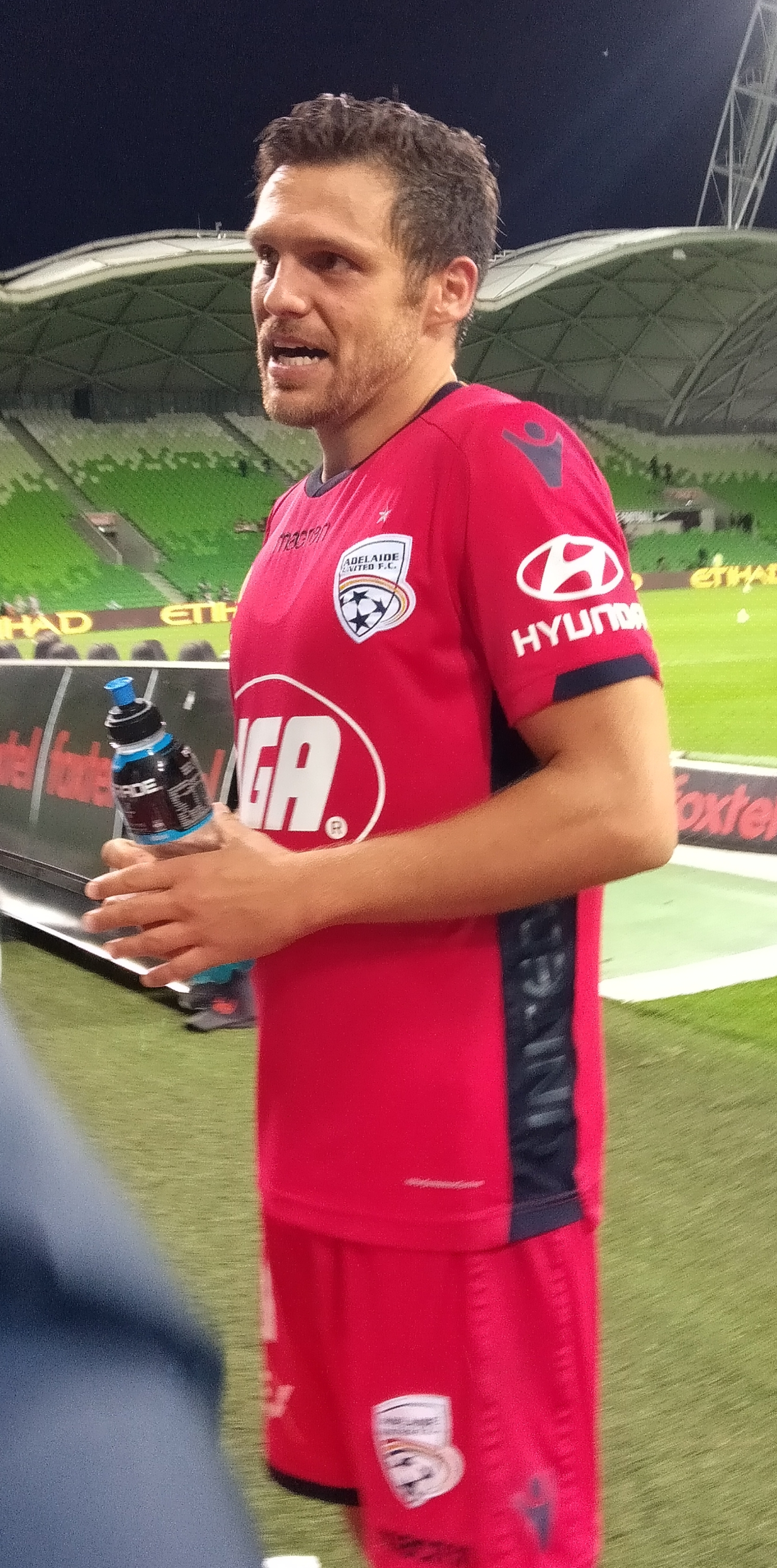
- Boland with Adelaide United

Personal information
- Date of birth: 23 April 1987 (age 39)
- Place of birth: Wesel, West Germany
- Height: 1.74 m (5 ft 9 in)
- Position: Midfielder

Team information
- Current team: SV Todesfelde
- Number: 31

Youth career
- 1992–2002: SV Rees
- 2002–2004: Schalke 04
- 2004–2006: MSV Duisburg

Senior career*
Years	Team	Apps	(Gls)
2006–2009	MSV Duisburg II	74	(8)
2008–2009	MSV Duisburg	0	(0)
2009–2018	Eintracht Braunschweig	293	(28)
2018–2020	Adelaide United	18	(0)
2020–2024	VfB Lübeck	129	(14)
2024–	SV Todesfelde	60	(9)
- * Club domestic league appearances and goals as of 22 September 2026

Mirko Boland (born 23 April 1987) is a German professional footballer who plays for Regionalliga Nord club SV Todesfelde as a midfielder.

== Career ==
Boland grew up in the Lower Rhine region, North Rhine-Westphalia, and played youth football for SV Rees, FC Schalke 04 and MSV Duisburg. After initially representing the club's reserve team he signed his first professional contract in 2008 with Duisburg.

After failing to break into Duisburg's first team during the 2008–09 season, Boland transferred to 3. Liga club Eintracht Braunschweig during the winter break. Since then he has become a regular starter in Braunschweig's midfield, appearing in over 150 games since 2009. In 2011, he and Eintracht Braunschweig won promotion back into the 2. Bundesliga, followed by promotion into the Bundesliga in 2013.

In July 2018, free agent Boland joined A-League side Adelaide United on a two-year contract. Boland suffered a hamstring strain on 11 November 2018 in a match against Perth Glory which could sideline him for up to six weeks.

In March 2020, it was announced Boland would be return to Germany in summer 2020 to join VfB Lübeck, having agreed a two-year contract.

== Career statistics ==
As of 17 July 2024

Appearances and goals by club, season and competition
Club	Season	League			Cup (Note: Includes DFB-Pokal)		Other (Note: Includes Bundesliga relegation playoffs, A-League finals)		Total	
Club	Season	Division	Apps	Goals	Apps	Goals	Apps	Goals	Apps	Goals
Eintracht Braunschweig	2008–09	3. Liga	18	2	—		—		18	2
Eintracht Braunschweig	2009–10	3. Liga	35	3	1	0	—		36	3
Eintracht Braunschweig	2010–11	3. Liga	37	3	1	0	—		38	3
Eintracht Braunschweig	2011–12	2. Bundesliga	32	2	1	0	—		33	2
Eintracht Braunschweig	2012–13	2. Bundesliga	30	4	2	1	—		32	5
Eintracht Braunschweig	2013–14	Bundesliga	33	1	—		—		33	1
Eintracht Braunschweig	2014–15	2. Bundesliga	33	3	3	0	—		36	3
Eintracht Braunschweig	2015–16	2. Bundesliga	29	5	2	0	—		31	5
Eintracht Braunschweig	2016–17	2. Bundesliga	27	3	1	0	2	0	30	3
Eintracht Braunschweig	2017–18	2. Bundesliga	19	2	1	0	0	0	20	2
Eintracht Braunschweig	Total		293	28	12	1	2	0	307	29
Adelaide United	2018–19	A-League	13	0	5	2	2	0	20	2
Adelaide United	2019–20	A-League	5	0	3	0	—		8	0
Adelaide United	Total		18	0	8	2	2	0	28	2
VfB Lübeck	2020–21	3. Liga	35	1	—		—		35	1
VfB Lübeck	2021–22	Regionalliga Nord	28	6	—		—		28	6
VfB Lübeck	2022–23	Regionalliga Nord	35	5	2	0	—		37	5
VfB Lübeck	2023–24	3. Liga	31	2	1	0	—		32	2
VfB Lübeck	Total		129	14	3	0	0	0	132	14
Career total			440	42	23	3	4	0	467	45
