= Kristin Konstandopoulos =

Australian soccer player

Personal information
- Full name: Kristin Konstandopoulos
- Date of birth: 10 October 1998 (age 28)
- Place of birth: Adelaide, Australia
- Height: 1.76 m (5 ft 9 in)
- Positions: Right back; right midfielder

Team information
- Current team: Adelaide Olympic

Youth career
- Adelaide Olympic
- 2017–2019: Adelaide United

Senior career*
Years	Team	Apps	(Gls)
2016	White City	23	(1)
2017	West Torrens Birkalla	8	(1)
2017–2019	Adelaide United NPL	35	(1)
2018–2019	Adelaide United	1	(0)
2019–	Adelaide Olympic	65	(9)
- * Club domestic league appearances and goals as of 11 September 2023 ‡ National team caps and goals as of 14 January 2018

Kristin Konstandopoulos (born 10 October 1998), is an Australian professional footballer who plays as a midfielder for Adelaide Olympic.

== Personal life ==
Konstandopoulos was born in Australia and is of Greek descent, and his brother Nathan is also a professional footballer.
