= Riley McGree =

Australian footballer (born 1998)

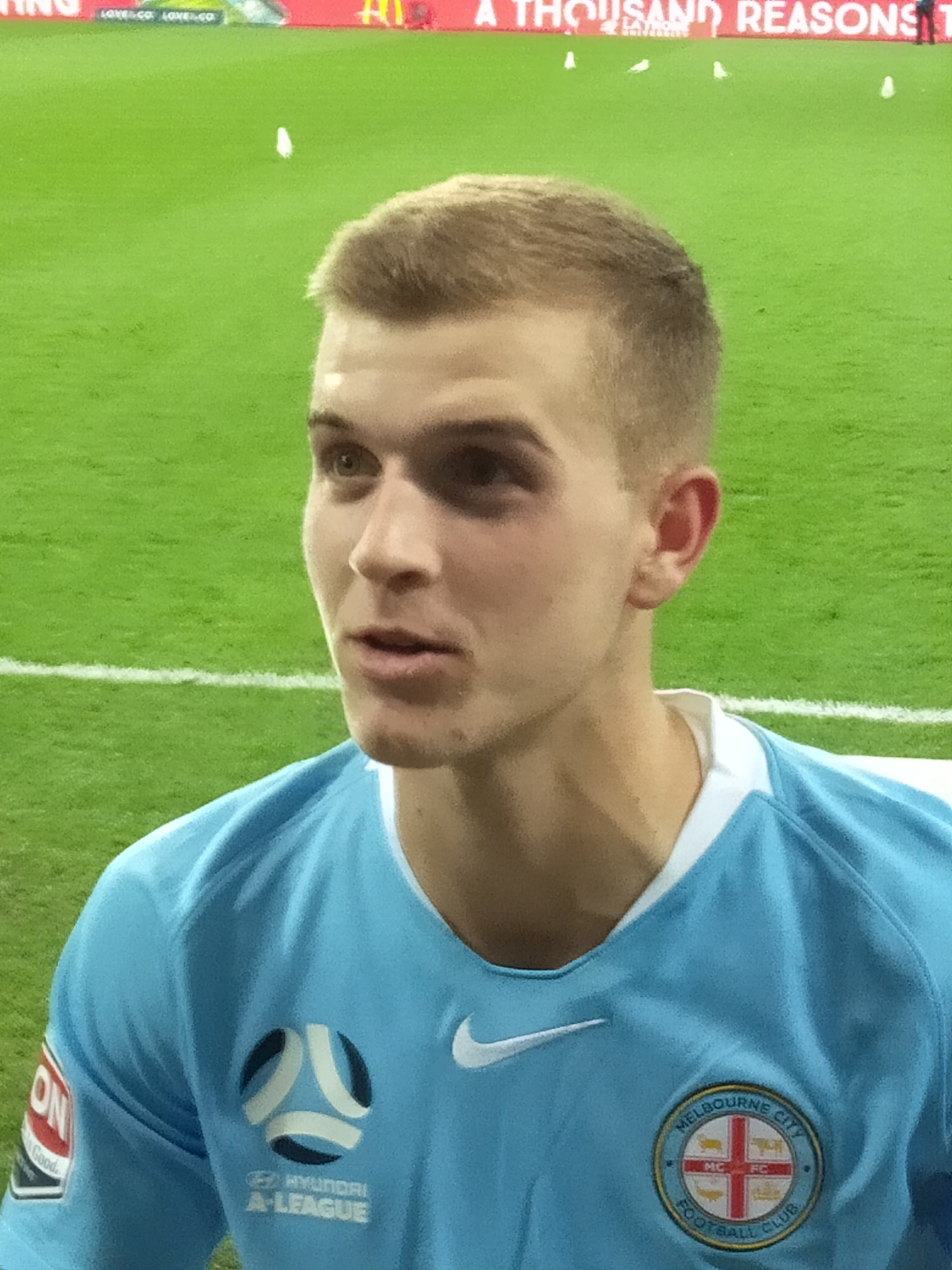
- McGree with Melbourne City in 2019

Personal information
- Full name: Riley Patrick McGree
- Date of birth: 2 November 1998 (age 28)
- Place of birth: Gawler, South Australia
- Height: 1.78 m (5 ft 10 in)
- Position: Attacking midfielder

Team information
- Current team: Middlesbrough
- Number: 8

Youth career
- 2003–2011: Gawler Eagles
- 2013: FFSA NTC
- 2014–2015: Adelaide United

Senior career*
Years	Team	Apps	(Gls)
2015–2016	Adelaide United NPL	27	(1)
2016–2017	Adelaide United	17	(1)
2017–2019	Club Brugge	0	(0)
2018	→ Newcastle Jets (loan)	12	(5)
2018–2019	→ Melbourne City (loan)	27	(7)
2019–2020	Adelaide United	23	(10)
2020–2022	Charlotte FC	0	(0)
2020–2022	→ Birmingham City (loan)	28	(3)
2022–	Middlesbrough	118	(18)

International career^{‡}
2013	Australia U17	2	(3)
2017–2021	Australia U23	9	(3)
2021–	Australia	38	(2)
Medal record
Men's football
Representing Australia
AFF U-16 Youth Championship
Third place	2013 Myanmar	U-17 Team
- * Club domestic league appearances and goals as of 17:02, 10 May 2026 (UTC) ‡ National team caps and goals as of 13 November 2026

Riley Patrick McGree (born 2 November 1998) is an Australian professional soccer player who plays as an attacking midfielder for EFL Championship club Middlesbrough and the Australian national team.

Born in Gawler, South Australia, McGree played youth football for Gawler, the FFSA NTC and Adelaide United before starting his professional career with Adelaide United in 2016. He joined Club Brugge of the Belgian top flight in 2017, and spent two loan spells back in Australia with Newcastle Jets and Melbourne City before returning to Adelaide United. That club sold him to Major League Soccer expansion franchise Charlotte FC, who loaned him to English Championship club Birmingham City for eighteen months, before selling him to Middlesbrough in 2022.

McGree was first called up to the Australian national team in 2017, having previously played for the under-17 side in 2013.

== Early life ==
McGree was born and raised in Gawler, South Australia, to the north of Adelaide. He joined Gawler Eagles FC as a four-year-old after the town's Australian rules football club was full, and remained with the Eagles for eight years.

== Club career ==
=== Adelaide United ===
McGree made his debut for Adelaide United in the A-League on 19 March 2016 in a draw with Western Sydney Wanderers. He made his first start for the club in a 2016 FFA Cup loss to Redlands United on 3 August 2016, having been called up from the club's youth squad. Two weeks later, McGree signed a one-year senior contract with Adelaide. McGree scored his first goal for the Reds in his second A-League start, on 29 January 2017, with a shot from the edge of the area in a draw with Wellington Phoenix.

=== Club Brugge ===
After impressing at Adelaide United, including being called up for the Australian national team, McGree left the national Australian league in July 2017 to join Belgian club Club Brugge.

==== Loan to Newcastle Jets ====
On 19 December 2017, it was announced that McGree would be joining the Newcastle Jets on a short-term loan deal for the remainder of the 2017–18 A-League season, as an injury replacement for Jake Adelson. The transfer would be officially lodged in January, with him expected to join the squad in late January, due to his international commitments in 2018 AFC U-23 Championship.

In that season's A-League semi-finals, McGree became the subject of international attention after scoring with a scorpion kick, and which received a nomination for the FIFA Puskas Award for the most beautiful goal in the world that year.

At the end of the season McGree returned to Club Brugge, though Newcastle Jets looked to sign him on loan once more.

==== Loan to Melbourne City ====
In June 2018, a few weeks after the announcement that McGree returned to Club Brugge, he returned to the A-League, joining Melbourne City on a season-long loan.

=== Return to Adelaide United ===
On 5 July 2019, it was announced that McGree would return to Adelaide United for an undisclosed fee for the next three seasons. McGree starred for Adelaide United in his season back for Adelaide United scoring 10 goals in the league and 3 goals in the cup, including one in the FFA Cup final against Melbourne City. He capped off his season by winning the Aurelio Vidmar Club Champion award for the best and fairest player at Adelaide United, and winning the club's golden boot award.

=== Charlotte FC ===
On 5 October 2020, McGree was sold to Major League Soccer expansion franchise Charlotte FC for an undisclosed fee.

==== Loan to Birmingham City ====
Immediately after joining Charlotte FC, McGree was loaned to English Championship club Birmingham City for the season. He made his Birmingham City debut on 17 October, as a substitute in a 1–0 defeat at home to Sheffield Wednesday. Two weeks later, he scored his first goal two minutes into his first start, away to Preston North End, when he reacted quickest to a loose ball after Lukas Jutkiewicz's mis-hit shot; the match ended 2–1 to Birmingham. McGree finished the season with 15 appearances, and his loan was renewed until 1 January 2022. He made his first league start of 2021–22 in October, in place of the injured Tahith Chong, and according to the Birmingham Mail, became "undroppable, impressing with his work-rate, mobility, versatility and, latterly, quality." He scored twice and made two assists in 13 league matches before his loan expired.

Although McGree was expected to return to Charlotte FC in preparation for their MLS debut, rumours in early January linked him with a permanent move either to Scottish Premiership club Celtic, managed by Ange Postecoglou, the coach who first called him up to the senior national team, or to another EFL Championship club. He chose not to join Celtic, and on 14 January, he signed for Middlesbrough.

=== Middlesbrough ===
McGree signed a three-and-a-half-year contract with EFL Championship club Middlesbrough on 14 January 2022; the fee was undisclosed. McGree made his debut for the club on 12 February, coming off the bench during a 4–1 win against Derby County. On 17 July 2024, McGree signed a new contract with Middlesbrough.

== International career ==
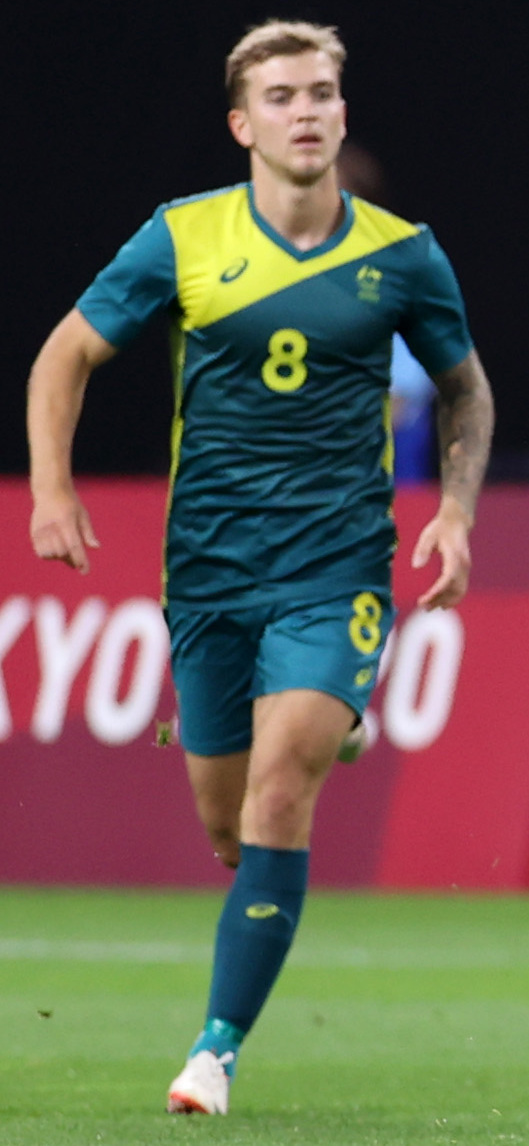
McGree playing for Australia U-23 at the 2020 Summer Olympics

McGree was called up to the Australia under-17 team in August 2013 for the 2013 AFF U-16 Youth Championship in Myanmar. He scored a hat-trick in the side's group stage win over Brunei.

In March 2017, McGree was called up to the Australian team for the first time, for 2018 FIFA World Cup qualification matches against Iraq and UAE.

In November 2019 he was one of four players suspended by the Australia national under-23 soccer team due to "unprofessional conduct". The four players allegedly mistreated a woman after an intimate encounter. As a result, McGree was forbidden to play in the upcoming 2020 AFC U-23 Championship, but was free to be selected for their World Cup team if Australia qualify.

McGree made his senior debut on 3 June 2021, as a late substitute in a 3–0 win against Kuwait in a 2022 World Cup qualifier. In a man-of-the-match performance on his first start, he provided two assists in a 5–1 victory against Chinese Taipei, and was a late substitute as Australia beat Jordan to complete a perfect record in the second phase of qualifying. He scored his first international goal to complete Australia's 4–0 defeat of Vietnam on 27 January 2022 in a third-phase qualifier.

In November 2022, McGree was called up to play in the 2022 FIFA World Cup. He started in Australia's opening match against France where Australia lost 4–1. In their final group stage game, McGree assisted Mathew Leckie's goal to beat Denmark 1–0. McGree started for the fourth time in a row in Australia's 2–1 defeat to Argentina.

== Career statistics ==
=== Club ===
As of match played 15 August 2026

Appearances and goals by club, season and competition
Club	Season	League			National cup (Note: Includes Australia Cup, FA Cup)		League cup (Note: Includes EFL Cup)		Continental		Other		Total	
Club	Season	Division	Apps	Goals	Apps	Goals	Apps	Goals	Apps	Goals	Apps	Goals	Apps	Goals
Adelaide United	2015–16	A-League	1	0	0	0	—		—		—		1	0
Adelaide United	2016–17	A-League	16	1	0	0	—		5 (Note: Appearances in AFC Champions League)	1	—		21	2
Adelaide United	Total		17	1	0	0	—		5	1	—		22	2
Club Brugge	2017–18	Belgian Pro League	0	0	0	0	—		0	0	—		0	0
Newcastle Jets (loan)	2017–18	A-League	12	5	0	0	—		—		—		12	5
Melbourne City (loan)	2018–19	A-League	27	7	3	1	—		—		—		30	8
Adelaide United	2019–20	A-League	23	10	5	3	—		—		—		28	13
Birmingham City (loan)	2020–21	Championship	15	1	0	0	—		—		—		15	1
Birmingham City (loan)	2021–22	Championship	13	2	0	0	2	0	—		—		15	2
Birmingham City (loan)	Total		28	3	0	0	2	0	—		—		30	3
Middlesbrough	2021–22	Championship	11	2	—		—		—		—		11	2
Middlesbrough	2022–23	Championship	43	6	1	0	0	0	—		2 (Note: Appearances in EFL Championship play-offs)	0	46	6
Middlesbrough	2023–24	Championship	22	4	0	0	3	2	—		—		25	6
Middlesbrough	2024–25	Championship	17	1	0	0	0	0	—		—		17	1
Middlesbrough	2025–26	Championship	25	5	0	0	0	0	—		3	1	28	6
Middlesbrough	2026–27	Championship	1	0	0	0	0	0	—		0	0	1	0
Middlesbrough	Total		119	18	1	0	3	2	—		5	1	128	21
Career total			226	44	9	4	5	2	5	1	5	1	250	52

=== International ===
As of match played 13 November 2026

Appearances and goals by national team and year
National team	Year	Apps	Goals
Australia	2021	7	0
Australia	2022	8	1
Australia	2023	3	0
Australia	2024	11	0
Australia	2025	4	0
Australia	2026	5	1
Total		38	2

Scores and results list Australia's goal tally first.

List of international goals scored by Riley McGree
No.	Date	Venue	Opponent	Score	Result	Competition	Ref.
1	27 January 2022	Melbourne Rectangular Stadium, Melbourne, Australia	Vietnam	4–0	4–0	2022 FIFA World Cup qualification	
2	13 November 2026	Abdullah bin Khalifa Stadium, Doha, Qatar	Qatar	1–0	3–0	Friendly	

== Honours ==
Adelaide United

- A-League Premiership: 2015–16
- FFA Cup: 2019

Individual

- Middlesbrough Goal of the Season: 2022–23
