= Louis D'Arrigo =

Australian soccer player (born 2001)

Personal information
- Full name: Louis Joseph D'Arrigo
- Date of birth: 23 September 2001 (age 25)
- Place of birth: Adelaide, Australia
- Height: 1.78 m (5 ft 10 in)
- Position: Defensive midfielder

Team information
- Current team: Melbourne Victory
- Number: 6

Youth career
- West Torrens Birkalla
- 2015: SA NTC
- 2018–2022: Adelaide United

Senior career*
| Years | Team | Apps | (Gls) |
| 2016–2017 | FFA CoE | 30 | (8) |
| 2018–2022 | Adelaide United NPL | 38 | (2) |
| 2018–2023 | Adelaide United | 97 | (3) |
| 2023–2025 | Lechia Gdańsk | 33 | (1) |
| 2025– | Melbourne Victory | 17 | (2) |

International career^{‡}
| 2019 | Australia U20 | 6 | (0) |
| 2022–2024 | Australia U23 | 17 | (4) |
Medal record
Men's football
Representing Australia
WAFF U-23 Championship
| Runner-up | 2024 Saudi Arabia | U23 Team |
AFF U-19 Youth Championship
| Winner | 2019 Vietnam | U20 Team |
AFF U-16 Youth Championship
| Winner | 2016 Cambodia | U17 Team |
- * Club domestic league appearances and goals as of 10 February 2026 ‡ National team caps and goals as of 14 March 2025

Louis Joseph D'Arrigo (Italian: [darˈriɡo]; born 23 September 2001) is an Australian professional footballer who plays as a defensive midfielder for Australian club Melbourne Victory.

== Club career ==
=== Adelaide United ===
D'Arrigo made his professional debut in a Round 21 clash against Sydney FC, replacing Ryan Strain in the 86th minute as Adelaide lost the game 2–0. After a standout 2017–18 Y-League campaign, D’Arrigo was named the league's Player of the Year at the Dolan Warren Awards in April. On 24 July 2018, he signed his first professional contract with Adelaide, penning a two-year scholarship deal with the club. He was the youngest player to make 50 appearances for Adelaide United before being over taken by Nestory Irankunda.

=== Lechia Gdańsk ===
On 5 September 2023, D'Arrigo joined Polish I liga side Lechia Gdańsk. He scored his first goal on 25 October 2024 in a 3–3 draw against Piast Gliwice.

== International career ==
Born in Australia, D'Arrigo is of Maltese and Italian descent. He is a youth international for Australia, having played up to the Australia U23s. In June 2023, he took part in the Maurice Revello Tournament in France with Australia.

== Honours ==
Adelaide United

- FFA Cup: 2019

Australia U-23

- WAFF U-23 Championship: runner-up 2024

Australia U20

- AFF U-19 Youth Championship: 2019

Australia U17

- AFF U-16 Youth Championship: 2016

Individual

- Y-League Player of the Year: 2017–18
- Adelaide United Youth Player of the Year: 2018–19
