= Nathan Konstandopoulos =

Australian footballer

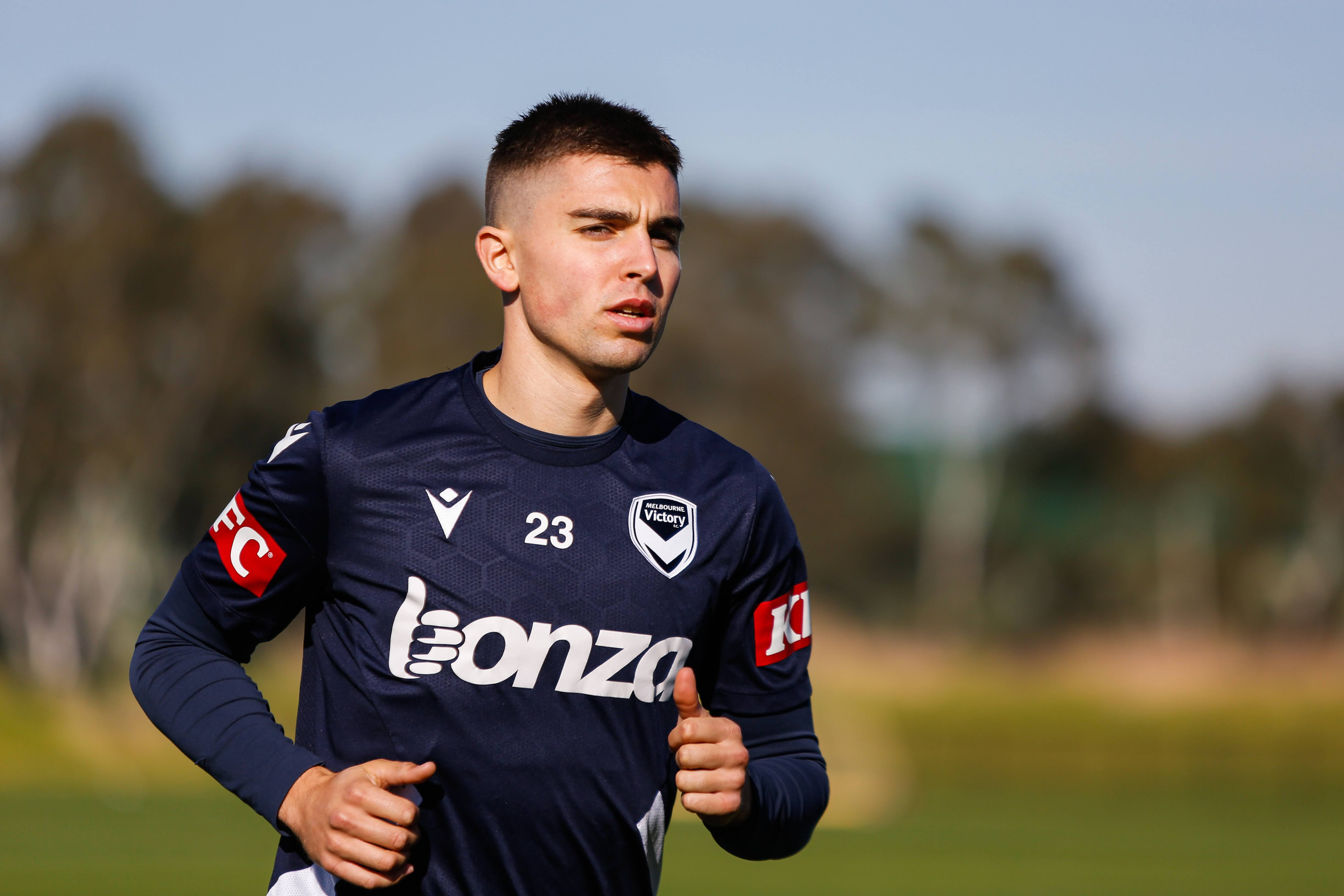
- Nathan Konstandopoulos training for Melbourne Victory, July 2023

Personal information
- Full name: Nathan Konstandopoulos
- Date of birth: 26 June 1996 (age 30)
- Place of birth: Adelaide, Australia
- Height: 1.80 m (5 ft 11 in)
- Position: Central midfielder

Team information
- Current team: Heidelberg United

Youth career
- Adelaide Comets
- –2013: Adelaide Olympic
- 2013–2015: Adelaide United
- 2016–2017: Brisbane Roar

Senior career*
| Years | Team | Apps | (Gls) |
| 2011–2014 | Adelaide Olympic | 51 | (11) |
| 2014–2016 | Adelaide United | 2 | (0) |
| 2015 | Adelaide United NPL | 9 | (2) |
| 2016–2017 | Brisbane Roar NPL | 11 | (0) |
| 2016–2017 | Brisbane Roar | 2 | (0) |
| 2017 | Adelaide United NPL | 8 | (1) |
| 2017–2021 | Adelaide United | 56 | (5) |
| 2022 | Adelaide United | 5 | (0) |
| 2022–2024 | Melbourne Victory | 10 | (0) |
| 2024– | Heidelberg United | 0 | (0) |
- * Club domestic league appearances and goals as of 28 January 2024

Nathan Konstandopoulos (born 26 June 1996) is an Australian footballer who plays as a central midfielder for Heidelberg United.

== Club career ==
Konstandopoulos played for Adelaide United and was released. He trained for a week with Brisbane Roar and was approached by Josep Gombau to join his academy in New York. After playing a strong part in Brisbane Roar's NPL side during the 2016 NPL Queensland season, he signed a one-year scholarship contract with the senior side. On 2 June 2017, he returned to Adelaide United. Konstandopoulos a highly sought-after attacking midfielder arrives signed for Heidelberg United.

== Personal life ==
Konstandopoulos' brother, Kristin Konstandopoulos, is also a footballer. He currently plays for Adelaide Olympic.

Konstandopoulos graduated in 2022 with a Bachelor of Laws (Honours) from the University of South Australia, and was admitted to practice in April 2024.
