= Isaac Richards (soccer) =

Australian football player

Personal information
- Full name: Isaac Michael Richards
- Date of birth: 9 April 1999 (age 27)
- Place of birth: Adelaide, Australia
- Height: 1.83 m (6 ft 0 in)
- Position: Goalkeeper

Youth career
- 2014: West Adelaide
- 2014–2015: FFSA NTC
- 2015–2020: Adelaide United

Senior career*
Years	Team	Apps	(Gls)
2016–2020	Adelaide United NPL	46	(0)
2017–2020	Adelaide United	1	(0)
- * Club domestic league appearances and goals as of 26 December 2019

Isaac Richards (born 9 April 1999) is an Australian former professional footballer who played as a goalkeeper for Adelaide United. He left football to pursue a career in mixed martial arts

== Club career ==
=== Adelaide United ===
On 14 December 2017, Richards signed a 1-year scholarship contract with Adelaide United. For the 2018 season Richards was awarded the prestigious Peter Nikolich Trophy for the SA National Premier League (NPL) Goalkeeper of the Year. In November 2018, at the age of 19, Richards' contract with Adelaide United was upgraded to a senior contract until the end of the season. In May 2019 his senior contract was extended for a further two years to May 2021.

On 2 October 2019, Richards made his professional senior debut being named in the starting lineup for Adelaide United in a FFA Cup semi-final fixture against the Central Coast Mariners. They would go on to win the match 2–1. Richards played the entirety of the match.

Richards made his A-League debut against the Central Coast Mariners on 22 December 2019.

In July 2020, Richards left football and Adelaide United to pursue a career in mixed martial arts.

== Career statistics ==
Appearances and goals by club, season and competition
Club	Season	League			Cup		Other		Total	
Club	Season	Division	Apps	Goals	Apps	Goals	Apps	Goals	Apps	Goals
Adelaide United	2017–18	A-League	0	0	0	0	0	0	0	0
Adelaide United	2018–19	A-League	0	0	0	0	0	0	0	0
Adelaide United	2019–20	A-League	1	0	1	0	0	0	2	0
Career total			1	0	1	0	0	0	2	0

== Honours ==
=== Club ===
Adelaide United

- FFA Cup: 2018, 2019
- State League 1 U-20 Premiership: 2015
- State League 1 U-20 Championship: 2015

=== Individual ===
- Adelaide United Joint Youth Player of the Year Award (with C. Devereux): 2017-18
- National Premier Leagues South Australia Awarded Goalkeeper of the Year: 2018
