= Michael Marrone (soccer) =

Australian soccer player

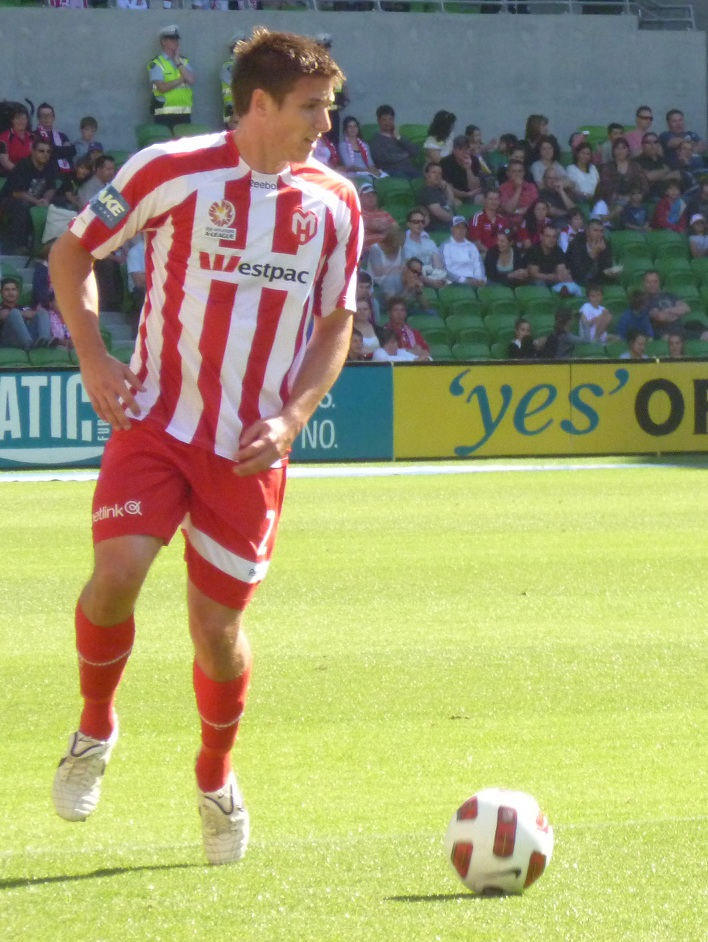
- Marrone playing for Melbourne Heart in 2011

Personal information
- Full name: Michael Robert Marrone
- Date of birth: 27 January 1987 (age 39)
- Place of birth: Adelaide, Australia
- Height: 1.79 m (5 ft 10 in)
- Positions: Right back; centre back

Team information
- Current team: Sturt Lions
- Number: 2

Youth career
- Valley View
- Adelaide Blue Eagles
- Para Hills Knights
- SASI
- 2004–2005: AIS
- 2008–2009: Adelaide United

Senior career*
Years	Team	Apps	(Gls)
2006–2007	Kingston City	26	(1)
2008	Para Hills Knights	19	(0)
2008–2010	Adelaide United	18	(0)
2009	→ Para Hills Knights (loan)	5	(0)
2010–2013	Melbourne Heart	70	(0)
2013	Shanghai Shenxin	16	(0)
2014–2021	Adelaide United	142	(3)
2021–	Sturt Lions	59	

International career^{‡}
2006–2007	Australia U-20	3	(0)
2012	Australia	1	(1)
- * Club domestic league appearances and goals as of 11 August 2023 ‡ National team caps and goals as of 7 December 2012

Michael Robert Marrone (born 27 January 1987) is an Australian professional soccer player who plays for Sturt Lions. He is also one of the most capped players for Adelaide United, with over 200 league appearances.

== Club career ==
=== Adelaide United (2008–2010) ===
Marrone made his professional debut on 18 December 2008 in the FIFA Club World Cup fifth-placed match against Al Ahly. He came off the bench in the 54th minute to replace Daniel Mullen, in a 1-0 win.

On 25 January 2009, he made his A-League debut for Adelaide United against the Central Coast Mariners.

On 3 March 2009, Marrone was signed to a full senior contract for Adelaide after having played for their youth squad. Later in 2009, Marrone played 5 league games for Para Hills Knights on loan.

He played 26 games for Adelaide United before signing with the new team Melbourne Heart.

=== Melbourne Heart ===
On 30 April 2010, it was announced that Marrone had signed with new A-League club Melbourne Heart for two years. He has played regularly at right back for the new club, and missed only one game in their inaugural season, which was the third Melbourne derby. In the fourth round of the season, he scored an own goal for Heart, in a match which was to end up a 2–2 draw with Perth Glory.

After the end of his first season with Melbourne Heart, Marrone travelled to the United Kingdom to partake in trials with British clubs Queens Park Rangers, Charlton Athletic and Celtic, and also played in a friendly match for Leicester City against West Bromwich Albion on 24 March 2011. He also attracted interest from Italian Serie A side Cagliari. He then signed for Shanghai Shenxin, and played 16 league games before returning to his hometown club.

=== Adelaide United (2014–2021) ===
On 3 February 2014, it was announced that Marrone was signed to return to Adelaide United, after a spell with Chinese club Shanghai Shenxin. After working his way into the starting line-up, he fractured two leg bones in a match against his former club Melbourne Heart on 4 April 2014.

On 21 November 2017, Marrone was sent off in the 2017 FFA Cup Final in the 115th minute for tackling a ball boy.

On 3 August 2021, it was announced that Marrone had left Adelaide United after 7 years. He played over 200 league games for the club, becoming one of the most capped players for Adelaide United. On the same day he was unveiled as a Sturt Lions player.

=== Sturt Lions (since 2021) ===
Joining the NPL SA side as a mid-season signing, Marrone took the number 2 shirt upon his arrival. Making his debut on the following weekend, the 7 August 2021, against Adelaide Croatia Raiders. In the 7th minute of his debut he scored with a long-range shot en route to a 4–1 victory.

Michael scored his second goal for Sturt in Round 5 of the 2022 NPLSA season, against Adelaide Olympic FC. Capping off a remarkable turnaround in the second half, from 3-0 down the Lions came back to win 4–3, with Marrone scoring a wonder goal in the 90th minute to wrap up all three points.

== International career ==
He received his first call-up for the full national team by coach Pim Verbeek in preparation for the match against Indonesia in Brisbane on 3 March 2010.

On 29 February 2012 he was selected to be on the bench once again against Saudi Arabia national football team in a World Cup qualification match.

In December 2012, he was on the bench for 3 games against Hong Kong, North Korea and Chinese Taipei in the East Asian Football Championship, and then made his first and only Socceroos appearance against Guam, which he also scored in a 9-0 thrashing.

== Career statistics ==
=== Club ===
As of 11 August 2023

Appearances and goals by club, season and competition
Club	Season	League			Domestic Cup (Note: Includes the FFA Cup, Chinese FA Cup and Football SA Federation Cup.)		Asia (Note: All appearances in the AFC Champions League, unless where noted.)		Other		Total	
Club	Season	Division	Apps	Goals	Apps	Goals	Apps	Goals	Apps	Goals	Apps	Goals
Adelaide United	2008–09	A-League	2	0	—		—		1 (Note: Appearance in FIFA Club World Cup.)	0	3	0
Adelaide United	2009–10	A-League	16	0	—		7	0	—		23	0
Adelaide United	Total		18	0	—		7	0	1	0	26	0
Para Hills Knights	2009	FFSA Super League	5	0	—		—		—		5	0
Melbourne Heart	2010–11	A-League	29	0	—		—		—		29	0
Melbourne Heart	2011–12	A-League	28	0	—		—		—		28	0
Melbourne Heart	2012–13	A-League	13	0	—		—		—		13	0
Melbourne Heart	Total		70	0	—		—		—		70	0
Shanghai Shenxin	2013	Chinese Super League	16	0	—		—		—		16	0
Adelaide United	2013–14	A-League	9	0	—		—		—		9	0
Adelaide United	2014–15	A-League	24	0	3	0	—		—		27	0
Adelaide United	2015–16	A-League	26	1	3	0	1	0	—		30	1
Adelaide United	2016–17	A-League	12	0	0	0	5	0	—		17	0
Adelaide United	2017–18	A-League	25	0	5	1	—		—		30	1
Adelaide United	2018–19	A-League	25	2	5	0	—		—		30	2
Adelaide United	2019–20	A-League	14	0	3	0	—		—		17	0
Adelaide United	2020–21	A-League	7	0	—		—		—		7	0
Adelaide United	Total		142	3	19	1	6	0	—		167	4
Sturt Lions	2021	NPL SA	12	1	—		—		—		12	1
Sturt Lions	2022	NPL SA	22	1	1	0	—		—		23	1
Sturt Lions	2023	NPL SA	22	0	2	0	—		—		24	0
Sturt Lions	Total		56	2	3	0	—		—		59	2
Career total			307	5	22	0	13	0	1	0	343	6

=== International ===
Appearances and goals by national team and year
National team	Year	Apps	Goals
Australia	2012	1	1

Scores and results list Australia's goal tally first, score column indicates score after each Marrone goal.

List of international goals scored by Michael Marrone
No.	Date	Venue	Opponent	Score	Result	Competition	Ref.
1	7 December 2012	Hong Kong Stadium, Causeway Bay, Hong Kong	Guam	3–0	9–0	2013 EAFF East Asian Cup qualification	

== Honours ==
Adelaide United

- A-League Premiership: 2015–16
- A-League Championship: 2015–16
- FFA Cup: 2014, 2018, 2019
