= 2021–22 Adelaide United FC season =

Adelaide United
2021–22 season
- Chairman: Piet van der Pol
- Manager: Carl Veart
- Stadium: Coopers Stadium
- A-League Men: 4th
- A-League Men Finals Series: Semi-finals
- FFA Cup: Quarter-finals
- Top goalscorer: League: Craig Goodwin (9); All: Craig Goodwin (11)
- Highest home attendance: 10,113 (15 May 2022 vs. Central Coast Mariners
- Lowest home attendance: 3,553 (16 March 2022 vs. Western Sydney Wanderers
- Average home league attendance: 6,501

The 2021–22 Adelaide United FC season was the club's 18th season since its establishment in 2003. The club participated in the A-League Men for the 17th time, and in the FFA Cup for the 7th time.

== Players ==
=== Squad information ===
Note: Flags indicate national team as defined under FIFA eligibility rules; some limited exceptions apply. Players may hold more than one non-FIFA nationality.

| No. | Pos. | Nation | Player |
|---|---|---|---|
| 1 | GK | AUS | James Delianov |
| 3 | DF | AUS | George Timotheou |
| 4 | DF | AUS | Nick Ansell |
| 6 | MF | AUS | Louis D'Arrigo |
| 7 | DF | AUS | Ryan Kitto |
| 9 | FW | AUS | Kusini Yengi |
| 10 | MF | ESP | Isaías |
| 11 | MF | AUS | Craig Goodwin (on loan from Al-Wehda) |
| 14 | FW | AUS | George Blackwood |
| 15 | FW | JPN | Hiroshi Ibusuki |
| 16 | MF | AUS | Nathan Konstandopoulos |
| 17 | FW | AUS | Mohamed Toure (scholarship) |
| 18 | MF | AUS | Joe Caletti |
| 19 | FW | AUS | Yaya Dukuly (scholarship) |
| 20 | FW | ENG | Zach Clough |

| No. | Pos. | Nation | Player |
|---|---|---|---|
| 21 | DF | ESP | Javi López |
| 22 | DF | DEN | Michael Jakobsen |
| 23 | DF | AUS | Jacob Tratt |
| 25 | DF | AUS | Lachlan Barr (injury replacement) |
| 27 | DF | AUS | Josh Cavallo |
| 28 | MF | ESP | Juande |
| 31 | MF | AUS | Bernardo (scholarship) |
| 37 | MF | AUS | Jonny Yull (scholarship) |
| 40 | GK | AUS | Ethan Cox (scholarship) |
| 41 | DF | AUS | Alexandar Popovic (scholarship) |
| 46 | GK | AUS | Joe Gauci |
| 47 | FW | AUS | Asad Kasumovic (scholarship) |
| 55 | MF | AUS | Ethan Alagich (scholarship) |
| 66 | FW | AUS | Nestory Irankunda (scholarship) |
| 77 | FW | AUS | Lachlan Brook (on loan from Brentford) |

== Transfers ==
=== Transfers in ===
| No. | Position | Name | From | Type/fee | Contract length | Date | Ref |
|---|---|---|---|---|---|---|---|
| 4 | DF | Nick Ansell | Unattached | Free transfer | 1 year | 30 July 2021 | |
| 14 | FW | George Blackwood | Unattached | Free transfer | 2 years | 2 August 2021 | |
| 23 | DF | Jacob Tratt | Unattached | Free transfer | 1 year | 6 August 2021 | |
| 10 | MF | (Spain) Isaías | Unattached | Free transfer | 3 years | 23 August 2021 | |
| 33 | GK | Dakota Ochsenham | Unattached | Injury replacement for Joe Gauci | 12 weeks | 16 September 2021 | |
| 47 | FW | Asad Kasumovic | (Australia) Adelaide City | Free transfer | 1.5 years | 10 December 2021 | |
| 25 | DF | Lachlan Barr | (Australia) Adelaide City | Injury replacement for Nick Ansell | 6 months | 29 December 2021 | |
| 77 | FW | Lachlan Brook | (England) Brentford | Loan | 6 months | 12 January 2022 | |
| 15 | FW | (Japan) Hiroshi Ibusuki | (Japan) Shimizu S-Pulse | Free transfer | 6 months | 14 January 2022 | |
| 20 | FW | (England) Zach Clough | Unattached | Free transfer | 5 months | 5 February 2022 | |
| 16 | MF | Nathan Konstandopoulos | Unattached | Free transfer | 5 months | 7 February 2022 | |

=== Transfers out ===
| No. | Position | Player | Transferred to | Type/fee | Date | Ref |
|---|---|---|---|---|---|---|
| 4 | DF | Ryan Strain | (Israel) Maccabi Haifa | Undisclosed fee | 23 June 2021 | |
| 34 | DF | Yared Abetew | (Australia) Newcastle Olympic | Free transfer | 24 June 2021 | |
| 15 | DF | Noah Smith | Unattached | End of contract | 28 June 2021 | |
| 24 | FW | Pacifique Niyongabire | Unattached | End of contract | 28 June 2021 | |
| 33 | GK | Dakota Ochsenham | Unattached | End of contract | 28 June 2021 | |
| 23 | DF | Jordan Elsey | Unattached | End of contract | 1 July 2021 | |
| 9 | FW | Tomi Juric | Macarthur FC | End of contract | 14 July 2021 | |
| 2 | DF | Michael Marrone | (Australia) Sturt Lions | End of contract | 3 August 2021 | |
| 35 | FW | Al Hassan Toure | Macarthur FC | Mutual contract termination | 13 October 2021 | |
| 16 | MF | Nathan Konstandopoulos | Unattached | End of contract | 16 October 2021 | |
| 33 | GK | Dakota Ochsenham | (Australia) Adelaide City | End of contract | 1 December 2021 | |
| 26 | FW | Ben Halloran | (South Korea) FC Seoul | Undisclosed fee | 2 January 2022 | |
| 8 | MF | Stefan Mauk | (Japan) Fagiano Okayama | Undisclosed fee | 27 February 2022 | |

=== From youth squad ===
| N | Pos. | Nat. | Name | Age | Notes |
|---|---|---|---|---|---|
| 37 | MF | (Australia) | Jonny Yull | 16 | 3-year scholarship |
| 41 | DF | (Australia) | Alexandar Popovic | 18 | 1-year scholarship |
| 66 | FW | (Australia) | Nestory Irankunda | 15 | 3-year scholarship |
| 55 | MF | (Australia) | Ethan Alagich | 18 | scholarship |

=== Contract extensions ===
| No. | Name | Position | Duration | Date | Notes |
|---|---|---|---|---|---|
| 21 | (Spain) Javi López | Full-back | 1 year | 12 June 2021 | |
| 28 | (Spain) Juande | Defensive midfielder | 1 year | 12 June 2021 | |
| 22 | (Denmark) Michael Jakobsen | Centre-back | 1 year | 1 July 2021 | |
| 11 | Craig Goodwin | Winger | 1 year | 2 July 2021 | |

== Technical staff ==
| Position | Name | Ref. |
|---|---|---|
| Head coach | (Australia) Carl Veart | |
| Assistant coach | (Australia) Damian Mori | |
| Assistant coach Head of Youth Football | (Brazil) Ayrton Andrioli | |
| Head of Football | (Australia) Vito Basile | |
| Goalkeeping coach | (Australia) Eugene Galekovic | |
| Strength and Conditioning Coach | (Australia) Django Gentilcore | |

== Pre-season and friendlies ==
| 12 October 2021 | Adelaide Victory (South Australia) | 0–3 | Adelaide United | Adelaide, Australia |
| 19:00 ACDT | | Report | Halloran 8' (pen.); Kitto 42'; Yengi 90' | Stadium: Steve Woodcock Sports Centre |

| 19 October 2021 | Para Hills Knights (South Australia) | 1–2 | Adelaide United | Adelaide, Australia |
| 19:00 ACDT | Shrestha 65' | Report | Dukuly 29'; Irankunda 62' | Stadium: The Paddocks |
Note: The match consisted of 2 40-minute halves

| 26 October 2021 | West Torrens Birkalla (South Australia) | 0–7 | Adelaide United | Adelaide, Australia |
| 19:00 ACDT | | Report | López 15'; Yengi 41', 45' (pen.); Bernardo 43'; Dukuly 47'; D'Arrigo 49'; Halloran 59' | Stadium: Steve Woodcock Sports Centre |

| 31 October 2021 | Brisbane Roar | 2–0 | Adelaide United | Ipswich, Australia |
| 14:00 AEST | Akbari 6', 8' | Report | | Stadium: North Ipswich Reserve |

| 5 November 2021 | Adelaide United | 3–0 | (South Australia) NPLSA Select | Adelaide, Australia |
| | Mauk 17'; Yengi 20', 63' | Report | | Stadium: Coopers Stadium; Attendance: 0 (behind closed doors); Referee: Daniel Goodwin |

== Competitions ==
Win Draw Loss Cancelled or postponed

=== Overview ===
| Competition | First match | Last match | Starting round | Final position | Record | | | | | | | |
| Competition | First match | Last match | Starting round | Final position | Pld | W | D | L | GF | GA | GD | Win % |
|---|---|---|---|---|---|---|---|---|---|---|---|---|
| A-League Men | 20 November 2021 | 8 May 2022 | Matchday 1 | 4th | 26 | 12 | 7 | 7 | 38 | 31 | +7 | 46.15 |
| A-League Men Finals | 15 May 2022 | 22 May 2022 | Elimination-finals | Semi-finals | 3 | 1 | 1 | 1 | 4 | 3 | +1 | 33.33 |
| FFA Cup | 26 September 2021 | 5 January 2022 | Round of 32 | Quarter-finals | 3 | 2 | 0 | 1 | 5 | 3 | +2 | 66.67 |
| Total | | | | | 32 | 15 | 8 | 9 | 47 | 37 | +10 | 46.88 |

Last updated: 22 May 2022
Source: Competitions

=== A-League ===
==== League table ====
| Pos | Team | Pld | W | D | L | GF | GA | GD | Pts | Qualification |
|---|---|---|---|---|---|---|---|---|---|---|
| 2 | Melbourne Victory | 26 | 13 | 9 | 4 | 42 | 25 | +17 | 48 | Qualification for finals series (Note: The top two teams enter the finals series at the semi-finals, while the teams ranked third to sixth enter the finals series at the elimination-finals.) |
| 3 | Western United (C) | 26 | 13 | 6 | 7 | 40 | 30 | +10 | 45 | Qualification for finals series |
| 4 | Adelaide United | 26 | 12 | 7 | 7 | 38 | 31 | +7 | 43 | Qualification for finals series |
| 5 | Central Coast Mariners | 26 | 12 | 6 | 8 | 49 | 35 | +14 | 42 | Qualification for finals series |
| 6 | Wellington Phoenix (Note: Wellington Phoenix cannot qualify for Asian Football Confederation competitions as they are based in New Zealand, which is under the Oceania Football Confederation.) | 26 | 12 | 3 | 11 | 34 | 49 | −15 | 39 | Qualification for finals series |

Source: A-Leagues
Rules for classification: 1) Points; 2) Goal difference; 3) Goals scored; 4) Points per game; 5) Least red cards; 6) Least yellow cards; 7) Toss of a coin in an event of a tie of two clubs.
(C) Champions

==== Results summary ====
| Overall | | | | | | | | Home | | | | | | Away | | | | | |
| Pld | W | D | L | GF | GA | GD | Pts | W | D | L | GF | GA | GD | W | D | L | GF | GA | GD |
|---|---|---|---|---|---|---|---|---|---|---|---|---|---|---|---|---|---|---|---|
| 26 | 12 | 7 | 7 | 38 | 31 | +7 | 43 | 7 | 2 | 4 | 22 | 14 | +8 | 5 | 5 | 3 | 16 | 17 | −1 |

Last updated: 8 May 2022.
Source: Ultimate A-League

==== Results by round ====
| Round | 1 | 2 | 3 | 4 | 5 | 6 | 7 | 8 | 9 | 10 | 11 | 12 | 13 | 14 | 15 | 16 | 17 | 18 | 19 | 20 | 21 | 22 | 23 | 24 | 25 | 26 |
|---|---|---|---|---|---|---|---|---|---|---|---|---|---|---|---|---|---|---|---|---|---|---|---|---|---|---|
| Ground | A | H | A | H | A | H | H | A | H | H | A | A | H | A | A | H | A | H | H | A | H | A | H | A | H | H |
| Result | D | D | D | L | L | W | W | L | D | D | W | W | L | D | L | W | W | W | D | L | L | W | W | W | W | W |
| Position | 4 | 7 | 8 | 10 | 11 | 11 | 7 | 7 | 7 | 7 | 5 | 3 | 4 | 3 | 3 | 4 | 4 | 3 | 3 | 3 | 6 | 4 | 4 | 4 | 4 | 4 |

Updated to match(es) played on 8 May 2022. Source: Ultimate A-League
A = Away; H = Home; W = Win; D = Draw; L = Loss

==== Matches ====
| 20 November 2021 1 | Perth Glory | 1–1 | Adelaide United | Perth |
| 19:05 AWST | Fornaroli 40' | Report | Yengi 22' | Stadium: HBF Park; Attendance: 17,198; Referee: Adam Kersey |

| 27 November 2021 2 | Adelaide United | 2–2 | Melbourne City | Adelaide |
| 19:15 ACDT | Mauk 78'; Halloran 90' | Report | Maclaren 28'; Nabbout 61' | Stadium: Coopers Stadium; Attendance: 7,017; Referee: Daniel Elder |

| 4 December 2021 3 | Brisbane Roar | 0–0 | Adelaide United | Kippa-Ring |
| 16:45 AEST | | Report | | Stadium: Dolphin Stadium; Attendance: 6,549; Referee: Chris Beath |

| 11 December 2021 4 | Adelaide United | 1–2 | Melbourne Victory | Adelaide |
| 19:15 AEST | Spiranovic 70' (o.g.) | Report | Margiotta 59'; Velupillay 78' | Stadium: Coopers Stadium; Attendance: 8,145; Referee: Adam Kersey |

| 17 December 2021 5 | Western United | 1–0 | Adelaide United | Melbourne |
| 19:45 AEDT | Pain 44' | Report | | Stadium: AAMI Park; Attendance: 2,353; Referee: Kurt Ams |

| 1 January 2022 7 | Adelaide United | 4–0 | Wellington Phoenix | Adelaide |
| 19:45 AEDT | Blackwood 7'; Goodwin 54' (pen.), 69' (pen.); López 80' | Report | | Stadium: Coopers Stadium; Attendance: 4,390; Referee: Daniel Elder |

| 8 January 2022 9 | Melbourne Victory | 1–1 | Adelaide United | Melbourne |
| 19:45 AEDT | D'Agostino 84' | Report | Goodwin 90' | Stadium: AAMI Park; Attendance: 6,912; Referee: Shaun Evans |

| 15 January 2022 10 | Adelaide United | 2–2 | Melbourne City | Adelaide |
| 19:15 ACDT | Blackwood 60'; Ibusuki 84' | Report | Nabbout 24'; Maclaren 66' | Stadium: Coopers Stadium; Attendance: 5,614; Referee: Chris Beath |

| 23 January 2022 11 | Brisbane Roar | 1–3 | Adelaide United | Kippa-Ring |
| 16:45 AEST | Mileusnic 2' | Report | Goodwin 24' (pen.), 85'; Mauk 48' (pen.) | Stadium: Moreton Daily Stadium; Attendance: 5,269; Referee: Jonathan Barreiro |

| 30 January 2022 12 | Newcastle Jets | 1–2 | Adelaide United | Newcastle |
| 18:45 AEDT | Mikeltadze 59' | Report | Irankunda 88'; Ibusuki 90+1' | Stadium: McDonald Jones Stadium; Attendance: 6,040; Referee: Alex King |

| 4 February 2022 13 | Adelaide United | 1–2 | Sydney FC | Adelaide |
| 19:45 ACST | Mauk 32' | Report | Kamsoba 10'; Bobô 73' | Stadium: Hindmarsh Stadium; Attendance: 7,245; Referee: Adam Kersey |

| 12 February 2022 14 | Wellington Phoenix | 1–1 | Adelaide United | Sydney |
| 16:50 AEDT | Sandoval 20' | Report | Oliveira 90+2' | Stadium: Netstrata Jubilee Stadium; Attendance: 797; Referee: Stephen Lucas |

| 15 February 2022 24 | Melbourne City | 1–2 | Adelaide United | Melbourne |
| 19:55 AEDT | Maclaren 11' | Report | López 20'; Toure 85' | Stadium: AAMI Park; Attendance: 2,728; Referee: Shaun Evans |

| 19 February 2022 15 | Macarthur FC | 4–1 | Adelaide United | Campbelltown |
| 19:45 AEDT | Giannou 43'; Noone 67'; A. Toure 73'; Ruhs 90+1' | Report | Goodwin 20' | Stadium: Campbelltown Stadium; Attendance: 2,702; Referee: Alireza Faghani |

| 26 February 2022 16 | Adelaide United | 2–1 | Central Coast Mariners | Adelaide |
| 19:45 AEDT | Ibuskui 52'; Irankunda 90+2' | Report | Nkololo 35' | Stadium: Coopers Stadium; Attendance: 7,868; Referee: Alex King |

| 5 March 2022 17 | Perth Glory | 1–2 | Adelaide United | Perth |
| 22:05 AEDT | Fornaroli 90' (pen.) | Report | Ibusuki 45+1'; Toure 59' | Stadium: HBF Park; Attendance: 6,657; Referee: Alireza Faghani |

| 13 March 2022 18 | Adelaide United | 2–1 | Newcastle Jets | Adelaide |
| 18:05 ACDT | Blackwood 3'; Toure 88' | Report | Thurgate 65' | Stadium: Coopers Stadium; Attendance: 6,921; Referee: Shaun Evans |

| 16 March 2022 8 | Adelaide United | 1–2 | Western Sydney Wanderers | Adelaide |
| 19:15 ACDT | Goodwin 8' | Report | Najjarine 26'; Cancar 75' | Stadium: Coopers Stadium; Attendance: 3,553; Referee: Daniel Elder |

| 20 March 2022 19 | Western Sydney Wanderers | 0–0 | Adelaide United | Sydney |
| 18:15 AEDT | | Report | | Stadium: CommBank Stadium; Attendance: 5,077; Referee: Tim Danaskos |

| 26 March 2022 20 | Central Coast Mariners | 3–0 | Adelaide United | Gosford |
| 19:45 AEDT | Ureña 77'; Cummings 90+1'; Hatch 90+3' | Report | | Stadium: Central Coast Stadium; Attendance: 3,086; Referee: Alireza Faghani |

| 2 April 2022 21 | Adelaide United | 0–1 | Melbourne Victory | Adelaide |
| 19:45 AEDT | | Report | Rojas 7' | Stadium: Coopers Stadium; Attendance: 8,044; Referee: Alex King |

| 8 April 2022 23 | Adelaide United | 1–0 | Macarthur FC | Adelaide |
| 19:45 AEST | Ibusuki 45+1' | Report | | Stadium: Coopers Stadium; Attendance: 5,166; Referee: Alireza Faghani |

| 12 April 2022 22 | Sydney FC | 2–3 | Adelaide United | Sydney |
| 19:05 AEST | Grant 6'; Buhagiar 62' | Report | Goodwin 36', 90+5'; Blackwood 89' | Stadium: Netstrata Jubilee Stadium; Attendance: 4,180; Referee: Alex King |

| 24 April 2022 6 | Adelaide United | 2–0 | Perth Glory | Adelaide |
| 17:05 AEST | Oliveira 24'; Irankunda 90+4' | Report | | Stadium: Coopers Stadium; Attendance: 7,387; Referee: Jack Morgan |

| 30 April 2022 26 | Adelaide United | 2–0 | Brisbane Roar | Adelaide |
| 19:45 AEST | Blackwood 15'; Ibusuki 28' | Report | | Stadium: Coopers Stadium; Attendance: 6,761; Referee: Ben Abraham |

| 8 May 2022 25 | Adelaide United | 2–1 | Western United | Adelaide |
| 18:20 AEST | López 14'; Kitto 51' | Report | Wenzel-Halls 5' | Stadium: Coopers Stadium; Attendance: 6,398; Referee: Shaun Evans |

==== Finals series ====
| 15 May 2022 Elimination final | Adelaide United | 3–1 | Central Coast Mariners | Adelaide |
| 15:35 ACST | Goodwin 26'; Yengi 67'; Oliveira 90+2' | Report | Roux 71' | Stadium: Coopers Stadium; Attendance: 10,113; Referee: Daniel Elder |

| 18 May 2022 Semi-final 1st leg | Adelaide United | 0–0 | Melbourne City | Adelaide |
| 18:35 ACST | | Report | | Stadium: Coopers Stadium; Attendance: 9,279; Referee: Chris Beath |

| 22 May 2022 Semi-final 2nd leg | Melbourne City | 2–1 (a.e.t.) (2–1 agg.) | Adelaide United | Melbourne |
| 14:05 AEST | Tilio 74'; Maclaren 92' | Report | Clough 48' | Stadium: AAMI Park; Attendance: 9,347; Referee: Alireza Faghani |

=== FFA Cup ===
| 26 September 2021 Round of 32 | Floreat Athena (Western Australia) | 1–3 (a.e.t.) | Adelaide United | Perth |
| 13:00 AWST | Saldaris 56' | Report | D'Arrigo 18'; Blackwood 92' (pen.); Dukuly 102' | Stadium: Litis Stadium; Attendance: 831; Referee: Adam Fielding |

| 17 October 2021 Round of 16 | Adelaide Olympic (South Australia) | 0–1 | Adelaide United | Adelaide |
| 15:00 ACST | | Report | Tratt 16' | Stadium: VALO Football Centre; Attendance: 2,637; Referee: Isabella Blaess |

| 5 January 2022 Quarter-final | Adelaide United | 1–2 | Melbourne Victory | Adelaide |
| 19:15 ACDT | Goodwin 33' | Report | Brillante 62'; Margiotta 79' (pen.) | Stadium: Coopers Stadium; Attendance: 3,156; Referee: Alex King |

== Statistics ==
=== Appearances and goals ===
Players with no appearances not included in the list.

As of 22 May 2022

| No. | Pos. | Nat. | Name | A-League | | | | | | | |
| No. | Pos. | Nat. | Name | Regular season | | Finals | | FFA Cup | | Total | |
| No. | Pos. | Nat. | Name | Apps | Goals | Apps | Goals | Apps | Goals | Apps | Goals |
|---|---|---|---|---|---|---|---|---|---|---|---|
| 1 | GK | (Australia) | James Delianov | 6 | 0 | 0 | 0 | 2 | 0 | 8 | 0 |
| 3 | DF | (Australia) | George Timotheou | 5 | 0 | 0 | 0 | 3 | 0 | 8 | 0 |
| 4 | DF | (Australia) | Nick Ansell | 1(1) | 0 | 0 | 0 | 0(1) | 0 | 3 | 0 |
| 6 | MF | (Australia) | Louis D'Arrigo | 9(11) | 0 | 0(2) | 0 | 3 | 1 | 25 | 1 |
| 7 | MF | (Australia) | Ryan Kitto | 21(3) | 1 | 3 | 0 | 3 | 0 | 30 | 1 |
| 9 | FW | (Australia) | Kusini Yengi | 5 | 1 | 2(1) | 1 | 1 | 0 | 9 | 2 |
| 10 | MF | (Spain) | Isaías | 21(1) | 0 | 3 | 0 | 2 | 0 | 27 | 0 |
| 11 | MF | (Australia) | Craig Goodwin | 20(4) | 9 | 3 | 1 | 1 | 1 | 28 | 11 |
| 14 | FW | (Australia) | George Blackwood | 9(5) | 5 | 2(1) | 0 | 0(2) | 1 | 19 | 6 |
| 15 | FW | (Japan) | Hiroshi Ibusuki | 14(4) | 6 | 2(1) | 0 | 0 | 0 | 21 | 6 |
| 16 | MF | (Australia) | Nathan Konstandopoulos | 0(5) | 0 | 0 | 0 | 0 | 0 | 5 | 0 |
| 17 | FW | (Australia) | Mohamed Toure | 5(13) | 3 | 0 | 0 | 1(1) | 0 | 20 | 3 |
| 18 | MF | (Australia) | Joe Caletti | 2(9) | 0 | 0 | 0 | 1 | 0 | 12 | 0 |
| 19 | FW | (Australia) | Yaya Dukuly | 1(3) | 0 | 0 | 0 | 0(2) | 1 | 6 | 1 |
| 20 | FW | (England) | Zach Clough | 7(4) | 0 | 1(1) | 1 | 0 | 0 | 13 | 1 |
| 21 | DF | (Spain) | Javi López | 25 | 3 | 3 | 0 | 3 | 0 | 31 | 3 |
| 22 | DF | (Denmark) | Michael Jakobsen | 13(1) | 0 | 3 | 0 | 0 | 0 | 17 | 0 |
| 23 | DF | (Australia) | Jacob Tratt | 12(1) | 0(1) | 0 | 0 | 3 | 1 | 17 | 1 |
| 25 | DF | (Australia) | Lachlan Barr | 13(3) | 0 | 0 | 0 | 0 | 0 | 16 | 0 |
| 27 | DF | (Australia) | Josh Cavallo | 10(9) | 0 | 0 | 0 | 3 | 0 | 22 | 0 |
| 28 | MF | (Spain) | Juande | 20(2) | 0 | 3 | 0 | 1(1) | 0 | 27 | 0 |
| 31 | MF | (Australia) | Bernardo | 10(10) | 2 | 0(3) | 1 | 2(1) | 0 | 26 | 3 |
| 41 | DF | (Australia) | Alexandar Popovic | 6(1) | 0 | 3 | 0 | 0 | 0 | 10 | 0 |
| 44 | DF | (Albania) | Arbi Mollas | 0 | 0 | 0 | 0 | 0(1) | 0 | 1 | 0 |
| 46 | GK | (Australia) | Joe Gauci | 19 | 0 | 3 | 0 | 0 | 0 | 22 | 0 |
| 47 | FW | (Australia) | Asad Kasumovic | 0(2) | 0 | 0 | 0 | 0 | 0 | 2 | 0 |
| 50 | GK | (Australia) | Steven Hall | 1(2) | 0 | 0 | 0 | 1 | 0 | 4 | 0 |
| 55 | MF | (Australia) | Ethan Alagich | 0 | 0 | 0 | 0 | 0(1) | 0 | 1 | 0 |
| 66 | FW | (Australia) | Nestory Irankunda | 0(11) | 3 | 0(2) | 0 | 0 | 0 | 13 | 3 |
| 77 | MF | (Australia) | Lachlan Brook | 13(3) | 0 | 2(1) | 0 | 0 | 0 | 19 | 0 |
Players no longer at the club
| 8 | MF | (Australia) | Stefan Mauk | 14 | 3 | 0 | 0 | 1 | 0 | 17 | 3 |
| 26 | MF | (Australia) | Ben Halloran | 5 | 1 | 0 | 0 | 2 | 0 | 7 | 1 |
| 35 | FW | (Australia) | Al Hassan Toure | 0 | 0 | 0 | 0 | 0(1) | 0 | 1 | 0 |

=== Disciplinary record ===
As of 22 May 2022

| Rank | No. | Pos. | Nat. | Name | A-League Men | | | A-League Men Finals series | | | FFA Cup | | | Total | | |
| Rank | No. | Pos. | Nat. | Name | Booked | (yellow card) (yellow-red card) | Sent off (straight red) | Booked | (yellow card) (yellow-red card) | Sent off (straight red) | Booked | (yellow card) (yellow-red card) | Sent off (straight red) | Booked | (yellow card) (yellow-red card) | Sent off (straight red) |
|---|---|---|---|---|---|---|---|---|---|---|---|---|---|---|---|---|
| 1 | 23 | DF | (Australia) | Jacob Tratt | 7 | 0 | 0 | 0 | 0 | 0 | 2 | 0 | 0 | 9 | 0 | 0 |
| 2 | 10 | MF | (Spain) | Isaías | 6 | 1 | 0 | 1 | 0 | 0 | 0 | 0 | 0 | 7 | 1 | 0 |
| 3 | 28 | MF | (Spain) | Juande | 7 | 0 | 0 | 1 | 0 | 0 | 0 | 0 | 0 | 8 | 0 | 0 |
| 4 | 21 | DF | (Spain) | Javi López | 6 | 1 | 0 | 0 | 0 | 0 | 0 | 0 | 0 | 6 | 1 | 0 |
| 5 | 8 | MF | (Australia) | Stefan Mauk | 4 | 0 | 0 | 0 | 0 | 0 | 1 | 0 | 0 | 5 | 0 | 0 |
| 6 | 7 | MF | (Australia) | Ryan Kitto | 4 | 0 | 0 | 0 | 0 | 0 | 0 | 0 | 0 | 4 | 0 | 0 |
| 6 | 11 | FW | (Australia) | Craig Goodwin | 3 | 0 | 0 | 1 | 0 | 0 | 0 | 0 | 0 | 4 | 0 | 0 |
| 6 | 15 | FW | (Japan) | Hiroshi Ibusuki | 4 | 0 | 0 | 0 | 0 | 0 | 0 | 0 | 0 | 4 | 0 | 0 |
| 9 | 6 | MF | (Australia) | Louis D'Arrigo | 2 | 0 | 0 | 0 | 0 | 0 | 1 | 0 | 0 | 3 | 0 | 0 |
| 9 | 17 | FW | (Australia) | Mohamed Toure | 3 | 0 | 0 | 0 | 0 | 0 | 0 | 0 | 0 | 3 | 0 | 0 |
| 9 | 18 | MF | (Australia) | Joe Caletti | 3 | 0 | 0 | 0 | 0 | 0 | 0 | 0 | 0 | 3 | 0 | 0 |
| 9 | 26 | MF | (Australia) | Ben Halloran | 2 | 0 | 0 | 0 | 0 | 0 | 1 | 0 | 0 | 3 | 0 | 0 |
| 9 | 41 | DF | (Australia) | Alexandar Popovic | 3 | 0 | 0 | 0 | 0 | 0 | 0 | 0 | 0 | 3 | 0 | 0 |
| 14 | 46 | GK | (Australia) | Joe Gauci | 1 | 0 | 1 | 0 | 0 | 0 | 0 | 0 | 0 | 1 | 0 | 1 |
| 15 | 3 | DF | (Australia) | George Timotheou | 1 | 0 | 0 | 0 | 0 | 0 | 1 | 0 | 0 | 2 | 0 | 0 |
| 15 | 9 | FW | (Australia) | Kusini Yengi | 1 | 0 | 0 | 1 | 0 | 0 | 0 | 0 | 0 | 2 | 0 | 0 |
| 15 | 25 | DF | (Australia) | Lachlan Barr | 2 | 0 | 0 | 0 | 0 | 0 | 0 | 0 | 0 | 2 | 0 | 0 |
| 15 | 27 | MF | (Australia) | Josh Cavallo | 2 | 0 | 0 | 0 | 0 | 0 | 0 | 0 | 0 | 2 | 0 | 0 |
| 15 | 31 | MF | (Australia) | Bernardo Oliveira | 1 | 0 | 0 | 1 | 0 | 0 | 0 | 0 | 0 | 2 | 0 | 0 |
| 15 | 77 | FW | (Australia) | Lachlan Brook | 2 | 0 | 0 | 0 | 0 | 0 | 0 | 0 | 0 | 2 | 0 | 0 |
| 21 | 22 | DF | (Denmark) | Michael Jakobsen | 1 | 0 | 0 | 0 | 0 | 0 | 0 | 0 | 0 | 1 | 0 | 0 |
| 21 | 66 | FW | (Australia) | Nestory Irankunda | 1 | 0 | 0 | 0 | 0 | 0 | 0 | 0 | 0 | 1 | 0 | 0 |

=== Clean sheets ===
As of 22 May 2022

| Rank | No. | Pos | Nat | Name | A-League Men | A-League Men Finals Series | FFA Cup | Total |
|---|---|---|---|---|---|---|---|---|
| 1 | 46 | GK | (Australia) | Joe Gauci | 4 | 1 | 0 | 5 |
| 2 | 1 | GK | (Australia) | James Delianov | 1 | 0 | 1 | 2 |
| Total | | | | | 5 | 1 | 1 | 7 |
