= 2020–21 Adelaide United FC season =

Adelaide United
2020–21 season
- Chairman: Piet van der Pol
- Manager: Carl Veart
- Stadium: Coopers Stadium
- A-League: 5th
- A-League Finals: Semi-finals
- FFA Cup: Cancelled
- Top goalscorer: League: Tomi Juric (7); All: Tomi Juric (9)
- Highest home attendance: 10,106 (3 January 2021 vs. Melbourne City
- Lowest home attendance: 5,728 (5 February 2021 vs. Perth Glory
- Average home league attendance: 7,383
Home colours	Away colours

The 2020–21 Adelaide United FC season is the club's 17th season since its establishment in 2003. The club will participate in the A-League for the 16th time. The club will not compete in the 2020 FFA Cup due to the event being cancelled following the COVID-19 pandemic in Australia.

== Players ==
=== Squad information ===
Note: Flags indicate national team as defined under FIFA eligibility rules; some limited exceptions apply. Players may hold more than one non-FIFA nationality.

No.	Pos.	Nation	Player
1	GK	AUS	James Delianov
2	DF	AUS	Michael Marrone
3	DF	AUS	George Timotheou
4	DF	AUS	Ryan Strain
6	MF	AUS	Louis D'Arrigo
7	DF	AUS	Ryan Kitto
8	MF	AUS	Stefan Mauk (captain)
9	FW	AUS	Tomi Juric
11	MF	AUS	Craig Goodwin (on loan from Al-Wehda)
15	DF	AUS	Noah Smith (scholarship)
16	MF	AUS	Nathan Konstandopoulos
17	FW	AUS	Mohamed Toure (scholarship)
18	MF	AUS	Joe Caletti
19	FW	AUS	Yaya Dukuly (scholarship)

No.	Pos.	Nation	Player
21	DF	ESP	Javi López
22	DF	DEN	Michael Jakobsen
23	DF	AUS	Jordan Elsey
24	FW	BDI	Pacifique Niyongabire
26	FW	AUS	Ben Halloran
27	MF	AUS	Josh Cavallo
28	MF	ESP	Juande
29	FW	AUS	Kusini Yengi
31	MF	AUS	Bernardo (scholarship)
33	GK	AUS	Dakota Ochsenham
34	DF	AUS	Yared Abetew
35	FW	AUS	Al Hassan Toure
40	GK	AUS	Ethan Cox (scholarship)
46	GK	AUS	Joe Gauci

== Transfers ==
=== Transfers in ===
No.	Position	Name	From	Type/fee	Contract length	Date	Ref
14	FW	Domenic Costanzo	(Australia) Croydon Kings	Scholarship	1 year	5 October 2020	
46	GK	Joe Gauci	Melbourne City	Scholarship	1 year	7 October 2020	
18	MF	Joe Caletti	Unattached	Free transfer	2 years	20 October 2020	
19	FW	Yaya Dukuly	Melbourne City	Scholarship	1 year	27 October 2020	
3	DF	George Timotheou	Unattached	Free transfer	2 years	10 November 2020	
1	GK	James Delianov	Western United	Free transfer	2 years	11 November 2020	
21	DF	(Spain) Javi López	Unattached	Free transfer	1 year	25 November 2020	
9	FW	Tomi Juric	Unattached	Free transfer	1 year	26 November 2020	
11	FW	Craig Goodwin	(Saudi Arabia) Al-Wehda	Loan	5 months	10 February 2021	
27	MF	Josh Cavallo	Unattached	Free transfer	4 months	18 February 2021	
28	MF	(Spain) Juande	(India) Kerala Blasters	Free transfer	3 months	26 March 2021	
31	MF	Bernardo Oliveira	Melbourne City	Scholarship	2 years	12 April 2021	

=== Transfers out ===
No.	Position	Player	Transferred to	Type/fee	Date	Ref
14	FW	George Blackwood	(England) Oldham Athletic	Free transfer	26 August 2020	
42	MF	Taras Gomulka	Unattached	Free transfer	11 September 2020	
20	GK	Paul Izzo	(Greece) Xanthi	Undisclosed	1 October 2020	
17	FW	Nikola Mileusnic	(Denmark) Randers	Mutual contract termination	5 October 2020	
18	MF	Lachlan Brook	(England) Brentford	Undisclosed	6 October 2020	
8	MF	Riley McGree	(United States) Charlotte FC	$820,000	6 October 2020	
11	FW	(Norway) Kristian Opseth	Unattached	End of contract	6 October 2020	
28	MF	(China) Chen Yongbin	Unattached	End of contract	8 October 2020	
10	MF	James Troisi	Western Sydney Wanderers	Mutual contract termination	14 December 2020	
14	FW	Domenic Costanzo	Unattached	Mutual contract termination	10 June 2021	

=== From youth squad ===
N	Pos.	Nat.	Name	Age	Notes
15	DF	(Australia)	Noah Smith	19	1-year scholarship
34	DF	(Australia)	Yared Abetew	21	

=== Contract extensions ===
No.	Name	Position	Duration	Date	Notes
22	(Denmark) Michael Jakobsen	Centre-back	1 year	7 October 2020	
27	Josh Cavallo	Central midfielder	2 years	11 May 2021	
46	Joe Gauci	Goalkeeper	2 years	25 May 2021	

== Technical staff ==
Position	Name	Ref.
Head coach	(Australia) Carl Veart	
Assistant coach	(Australia) Ross Aloisi	
Assistant coach Head of Youth Football	(Brazil) Airton Andrioli	
Director of Football	(Australia) Bruce Djite	
Goalkeeping coach	(Australia) Eugene Galekovic	
Strength and Conditioning Coach	(Australia) Django Gentilcore	

== Pre-season and friendlies ==
Win Draw Loss

4 November 2020	Adelaide Blue Eagles (Australia)	0–2	(Australia) Adelaide United	Adelaide, Australia
19:00 ACDT		Report	Yengi 9'; M. Toure 87'	Stadium: Marden Sports Complex; Referee: Daniel Elder

10 November 2020	Para Hills Knights (Australia)	0–2	(Australia) Adelaide United	Adelaide, Australia
19:00 ACDT		Report	Marrone 4'; 49' (o.g.)	Stadium: The Paddocks; Referee: Daniel Elder

3 December 2020	Adelaide United (Australia)	8–0	(Australia) Adelaide Comets	Adelaide, Australia
	Halloran 8', 87'; Yengi 11', 37' (pen.), 59'; Dukuly 42', 75'; Strain 69'	Report		Stadium: Coopers Stadium; Attendance: 0 (behind closed doors)

7 December 2020	Western Sydney Wanderers (Australia)	0–2	(Australia) Adelaide United	Sydney, Australia
17:30 AEDT		Report	Yengi 15'; Konstandopoulos 90'	Stadium: Valentine Sports Park; Attendance: 0 (behind closed doors)

10 December 2020	Macarthur FC (Australia)	3–1	(Australia) Adelaide United	Sydney, Australia
11:00 AEDT	Franjic 20'; Najjar 43'; Derbyshire 44'	Report	Mauk 47' (pen.)	Stadium: Valentine Sports Park; Attendance: 0 (behind closed doors); Referee: Kurt Ams

== Competitions ==
Win Draw Loss

=== Overview ===
Competition	First match	Last match	Starting round	Final position	Record							
Competition	First match	Last match	Starting round	Final position	Pld	W	D	L	GF	GA	GD	Win %
A-League	28 December 2020	3 June 2021	Matchday 1	5th	26	11	6	9	39	41	−2	42.31
A-League Finals	13 June 2021	19 June 2021	Elimination-finals	Semi-finals	2	1	0	1	3	3	+0	50.00
Total					28	12	6	10	42	44	−2	42.86

Source: Soccerway

=== A-League ===
==== League table ====
Pos	Team	Pld	W	D	L	GF	GA	GD	Pts	Qualification
3	Central Coast Mariners	26	12	6	8	35	31	+4	42	Qualification for finals series (Note: The top two teams entered the finals series at the semi-finals, while the teams ranked third to sixth entered the finals series at the elimination-finals.)
4	Brisbane Roar	26	11	7	8	36	28	+8	40	Qualification for finals series
5	Adelaide United	26	11	6	9	39	41	−2	39	Qualification for finals series
6	Macarthur FC	26	11	6	9	33	36	−3	39	Qualification for finals series
7	Wellington Phoenix (Note: Wellington Phoenix cannot qualify for Asian Football Confederation competitions as they are based in New Zealand, which is under the Oceania Football Confederation.)	26	10	8	8	44	34	+10	38	

Source: A-Leagues
Rules for classification: 1) Points; 2) Goal difference; 3) Goals scored; 4) Least red cards; 5) Least yellow cards; 6) Toss of a coin in an event of a tie of two clubs.

==== Results summary ====
Overall								Home						Away					
Pld	W	D	L	GF	GA	GD	Pts	W	D	L	GF	GA	GD	W	D	L	GF	GA	GD
26	11	6	9	39	41	−2	39	7	4	2	18	13	+5	4	2	7	21	28	−7

Last updated: 3 June 2021.
Source: Ultimate A-League

==== Results by round ====
Round	1	2	3	4	5	6	7	8	9	10	11	12	13	14	15	16	17	18	19	20	21	22	23	24	25	26
Ground	A	H	A	A	H	H	A	H	A	A	H	H	A	A	H	H	A	H	H	A	H	H	A	H	A	A
Result	D	W	W	L	W	D	D	D	L	W	W	W	L	W	W	D	L	W	L	L	L	D	L	W	L	W
Position	4	2	2	7	2	5	7	8	7	5	4	3	3	2	5	2	3	4	4	4	4	4	6	6	6	5

Updated to match(es) played on 3 June 2021. Source: Ultimate A-League
A = Away; H = Home; W = Win; D = Draw; L = Loss

==== Matches ====
On 24 November 2020, the A-League fixtures for the season were announced. Due to having 26 rounds in a 12 team league, Adelaide will play against Melbourne Victory, Perth Glory, Sydney FC and Western Sydney Wanderers three times.

28 December 2020 1	Western United	0–0	Adelaide United	Geelong
19:05 AEDT		Report		Stadium: GMHBA Stadium; Attendance: 5,128; Referee: Shaun Evans

3 January 2021 2	Adelaide United	2–0	Melbourne City	Adelaide
17:30 ACDT	Juric 66'; Mauk 76'	Report		Stadium: Coopers Stadium; Attendance: 10,106; Referee: Alireza Faghani

20 January 2021 4	Perth Glory	5–3	Adelaide United	Perth
18:20 AWST	Kilkenny 10' (pen.); D'Agostino 34', 60'; Fornaroli 51'; Armiento 84'	Report	Konstandopoulos 42'; M. Toure 88'; Halloran 90+3'	Stadium: HBF Park; Attendance: 6,125; Referee: Adam Fielding

23 January 2021 5	Adelaide United	1–0	Melbourne Victory	Adelaide
18:30 ACDT	M. Toure 53'	Report		Stadium: Coopers Stadium; Attendance: 8,133; Referee: Chris Beath

30 January 2021 9	Brisbane Roar	3–1	Adelaide United	Redcliffe
20:15 AEST	Wenzel Halls 37', 78'; O'Shea 45'	Report	Konstandopoulos 82'	Stadium: Dolphin Stadium; Attendance: 8,747; Referee: Alireza Faghani

5 February 2021 19	Adelaide United	1–2	Perth Glory	Adelaide
18:35 ACST	Mauk 20'	Report	Fornaroli 73'; Stynes 83'	Stadium: Coopers Stadium; Attendance: 5,728; Referee: Adam Kersey

12 February 2021 25	Macarthur FC	4–0	Adelaide United	Campbelltown
19:05 AEDT	Derbyshire 66', 73', 89'; Milligan 83'	Report		Stadium: Campbelltown Stadium

19 February 2021 24	Adelaide United	3–2	Central Coast Mariners	Adelaide
18:35 ACDT	Juric 34' (pen.), 70' (pen.), 85' (pen.)	Report	De Silva 15'; Kuol 63'	Stadium: Coopers Stadium; Attendance: 6,339; Referee: Adam Fielding

27 February 2021 3	Western Sydney Wanderers	2–3	Adelaide United	Parramatta
17:05 AEDT	Kamau 61'; Duke 90'	Report	Goodwin 2'; Mauk 44'; M. Toure 82'	Stadium: Bankwest Stadium; Attendance: 8,456; Referee: Adam Kersey

5 March 2021 11	Adelaide United	2–1	Newcastle Jets	Adelaide
18:30 ACDT	D'Arrigo 6'; Goodwin 77'	Report	O'Toole 22'	Stadium: Coopers Stadium; Attendance: 7,350; Referee: Stephen Lucas

13 March 2021 10	Melbourne Victory	1–3	Adelaide United	Melbourne
19:10 AEDT	Brimmer 28'	Report	Mauk 37', 77'; Yengi 61'	Stadium: Marvel Stadium; Attendance: 5,217; Referee: Chris Beath

21 March 2021 14	Newcastle Jets	1–4	Adelaide United	Newcastle
18:40 AEDT	Stamatelopoulos 69'	Report	Yengi 5'; Mauk 11'; Halloran 40'; Goodwin 43' (pen.)	Stadium: McDonald Jones Stadium; Attendance: 2,414; Referee: Jonathan Barreiro

28 March 2021 15	Adelaide United	1–0	Sydney FC	Adelaide
17:40 ACDT	Goodwin 76' (pen.)	Report		Stadium: Coopers Stadium; Attendance: 8,451; Referee: Shaun Evans

1 April 2021 13	Central Coast Mariners	2–1	Adelaide United	Gosford
19:40 AEDT	Bozanic 72'; Kuol 76'	Report	Yengi 48'	Stadium: Central Coast Stadium; Attendance: 5,053; Referee: Shaun Evans

10 April 2021 16	Adelaide United	1–1	Western Sydney Wanderers	Adelaide
18:40 ACST	Juric 11'	Report	Cox 68'	Stadium: Coopers Stadium; Attendance: 6,787; Referee: Daniel Elder

14 April 2021 18	Adelaide United	3–1	Macarthur FC	Adelaide
19:05 ACST	Juric 15'; Goodwin 72' (pen.); Halloran 84'	Report	Derbyshire 33'	Stadium: Coopers Stadium; Attendance: 7,184; Referee: Stephen Lucas

18 April 2021 7	Sydney FC	2–2	Adelaide United	Sydney
16:05 AEST	Bobô 19', 51'	Report	Elsey 75'; Juric 79'	Stadium: Leichhardt Oval; Attendance: 7,718; Referee: Shaun Evans

25 April 2021 20	Wellington Phoenix	2–1	Adelaide United	Wollongong
16:10 AEST	Waine 58'; Hemed 90+7' (pen.)	Report	Mauk 51'	Stadium: WIN Stadium; Attendance: 1,903; Referee: Adam Kersey

30 April 2021 6	Adelaide United	0–0	Western United	Adelaide
19:05 ACST		Report		Stadium: Coopers Stadium; Attendance: 7,699; Referee: Chris Beath

7 May 2021 8	Adelaide United	0–0	Wellington Phoenix	Adelaide
19:35 ACST		Report		Stadium: Coopers Stadium; Attendance: 7,172; Referee: Alireza Faghani

13 May 2021 17	Melbourne City	4–1	Adelaide United	Melbourne
19:05 AEST	Jamieson 8'; Galloway 45'; Maclaren 72' (pen.), 82'	Report	Halloran 51'	Stadium: AAMI Park; Attendance: 3,370; Referee: Alex King

16 May 2021 12	Adelaide United	1–0	Brisbane Roar	Adelaide
18:10 ACST	Goodwin 23'	Report		Stadium: Coopers Stadium; Attendance: 6,723; Referee: Ben Abraham

19 May 2021 23	Perth Glory	2–1	Adelaide United	Perth
21:20 AWST	Fornaroli 78'; Ikonomidis 86'	Report	Yengi 28'	Stadium: HBF Park; Attendance: 3,523; Referee: Shaun Evans

23 May 2021 26	Melbourne Victory	0–1	Adelaide United	Melbourne
18:10 AEST		Report	Goodwin 39'	Stadium: AAMI Park; Attendance: 5,413; Referee: Alireza Faghani

29 May 2021 22	Adelaide United	1–4	Sydney FC	Adelaide
19:10 ACST	Dukuly 89'	Report	Le Fondre 6', 54'; Bobô 58'; Wood 71'	Stadium: Coopers Stadium; Attendance: 8,198; Referee: Daniel Elder

3 June 2021 21	Adelaide United	2–2	Western Sydney Wanderers	Adelaide
19:35 ACDT	Gordon 11' (o.g.); Goodwin 56'	Report	Strain 22' (o.g.); Dorrans 30'	Stadium: Coopers Stadium; Attendance: 6,103; Referee: Alex King

==== Finals series ====
13 June 2021 Elimination-final	Brisbane Roar	1–2	Adelaide United	Kippa-Ring
15:05 AEST	Parsons 56'	Report	Juric 15', 19'	Stadium: Dolphin Stadium; Attendance: 7,782; Referee: Alex King

19 June 2021 Semi-final	Sydney FC	2–1	Adelaide United	Sydney
19:05 AEST	Le Fondre 24' (pen.); Bobô 43'	Report	Juande 64'	Stadium: Jubilee Stadium; Referee: Alireza Faghani

== Statistics ==
=== Appearances and goals ===
Includes all competitions. Players with no appearances not included in the list.

No.	Pos	Nat	Player	Total		A-League		A-League Finals	
No.	Pos	Nat	Player	Apps	Goals	Apps	Goals	Apps	Goals
1	GK	(Australia) AUS	James Delianov	18	0	16	0	2	0
2	DF	(Australia) AUS	Michael Marrone	7	0	3+3	0	0+1	0
3	DF	(Australia) AUS	George Timotheou	14	0	11+3	0	0	0
4	DF	(England) ENG	Ryan Strain	21	0	19	0	2	0
6	MF	(Australia) AUS	Louis D'Arrigo	27	1	22+3	1	2	0
7	DF	(Australia) AUS	Ryan Kitto	15	0	7+6	0	2	0
8	MF	(Australia) AUS	Stefan Mauk	25	7	22+1	7	2	0
9	FW	(Australia) AUS	Tomi Juric	18	9	14+2	7	2	2
11	FW	(Australia) AUS	Craig Goodwin	18	8	18	8	0	0
15	DF	(Australia) AUS	Noah Smith	9	0	9	0	0	0
16	MF	(Australia) AUS	Nathan Konstandopoulos	7	2	2+5	2	0	0
17	FW	(Australia) AUS	Mohamed Toure	15	3	2+12	3	0+1	0
18	MF	(Australia) AUS	Joe Caletti	21	0	12+8	0	0+1	0
19	MF	(Australia) AUS	Yaya Dukuly	10	1	6+4	1	0	0
21	DF	(Spain) ESP	Javi López	14	0	8+4	0	2	0
22	DF	(Denmark) DEN	Michael Jakobsen	17	0	15	0	2	0
23	DF	(Australia) AUS	Jordan Elsey	27	1	25	1	2	0
24	FW	(Burundi) BDI	Pacifique Niyongabire	18	0	1+15	0	0+2	0
26	FW	(Australia) AUS	Ben Halloran	28	4	26	4	2	0
27	MF	(Australia) AUS	Josh Cavallo	19	0	15+3	0	0+1	0
28	MF	(Spain) ESP	Juande	12	1	9+2	0	1	1
29	FW	(Australia) AUS	Kusini Yengi	16	4	7+9	4	0	0
34	MF	(Australia) AUS	Yared Abetew	8	0	3+5	0	0	0
35	FW	(Australia) AUS	Al Hassan Toure	18	0	4+13	0	0+1	0
37	MF	(Australia) AUS	Jonny Yull	2	0	0+2	0	0	0
46	GK	(Australia) AUS	Joe Gauci	10	0	10	0	0	0

- Source: Soccerway

=== Disciplinary record ===
Includes all competitions. The list is sorted by squad number when total cards are equal. Players with no cards not included in the list.

No.	Pos	Nat	Player	Total			A-League			A-League Finals		
No.	Pos	Nat	Player	Yellow card	Second yellow card	Red card	Yellow card	Second yellow card	Red card	Yellow card	Second yellow card	Red card
6	MF	(Australia) AUS	Louis D'Arrigo	6	1	0	5	1	0	1	0	0
23	DF	(Australia) AUS	Jordan Elsey	4	1	0	4	1	0	0	0	0
4	DF	(England) ENG	Ryan Strain	2	1	0	2	1	0	0	0	0
17	FW	(Australia) AUS	Mohamed Toure	1	1	0	1	1	0	0	0	0
26	FW	(Australia) AUS	Ben Halloran	7	0	0	7	0	0	0	0	0
8	MF	(Australia) AUS	Stefan Mauk	6	0	0	5	0	0	1	0	0
18	MF	(Australia) AUS	Joe Caletti	6	0	0	6	0	0	0	0	0
28	MF	(Spain) ESP	Juande	5	0	0	4	0	0	1	0	0
9	FW	(Australia) AUS	Tomi Juric	4	0	0	4	0	0	0	0	0
29	FW	(Australia) AUS	Kusini Yengi	4	0	0	4	0	0	0	0	0
15	DF	(Australia) AUS	Noah Smith	3	0	0	3	0	0	0	0	0
21	DF	(Spain) ESP	Javi López	3	0	0	2	0	0	1	0	0
27	MF	(Australia) AUS	Josh Cavallo	3	0	0	3	0	0	0	0	0
35	FW	(Australia) AUS	Al Hassan Toure	3	0	0	3	0	0	0	0	0
11	FW	(Australia) AUS	Craig Goodwin	2	0	0	2	0	0	0	0	0
22	DF	(Denmark) DEN	Michael Jakobsen	2	0	0	2	0	0	0	0	0
34	MF	(Australia) AUS	Yared Abetew	1	0	0	1	0	0	0	0	0
46	GK	(Australia) AUS	Joe Gauci	1	0	0	1	0	0	0	0	0

- Source: Soccerway
- (yellow card) = Number of bookings; (second yellow card) = Number of sending offs after a second yellow card; (red card) = Number of sending offs by a direct red card.
