= Kusini Yengi =

Australian soccer player (born 1999)

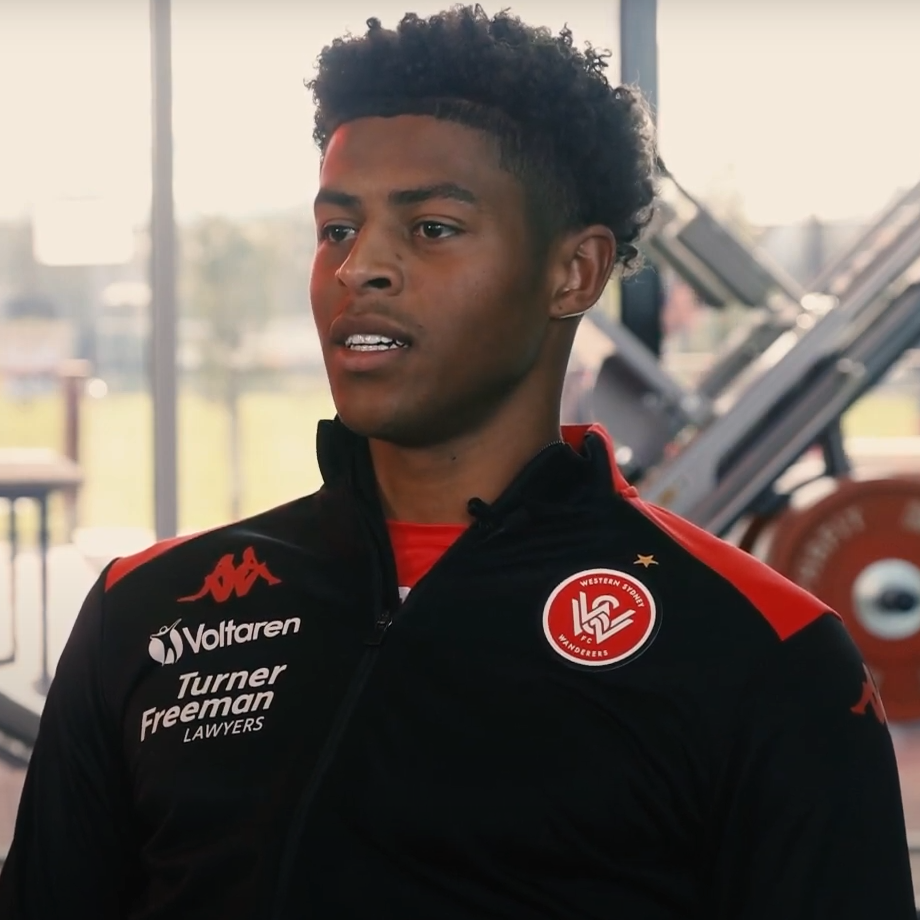
- Yengi with Western Sydney Wanderers in 2022

Personal information
- Full name: Kusini Boja Yengi
- Date of birth: 15 January 1999 (age 27)
- Place of birth: Adelaide, South Australia, Australia
- Height: 1.89 m (6 ft 2 in)
- Position: Striker

Team information
- Current team: Sanfrecce Hiroshima (on loan from Aberdeen)
- Number: 9

Youth career
- Fulham United
- 2014: SA NTC
- 2015–2017: Adelaide Comets

Senior career*
Years	Team	Apps	(Gls)
2017–2018	Adelaide Comets	16	(0)
2018–2020	Adelaide United NPL	23	(3)
2019–2022	Adelaide United	27	(6)
2022–2023	Western Sydney Wanderers	18	(4)
2023–2025	Portsmouth	40	(9)
2025–	Aberdeen	4	(0)
2026	→ Cerezo Osaka (loan)	4	(0)
2026–	→ Sanfrecce Hiroshima (loan)	0	(0)

International career
2022	Australia U23	4	(0)
2023–2024	Australia	11	(6)
- * Club domestic league appearances and goals as of 20:27, 25 March 2026 (UTC)

Kusini Boja Yengi (born 15 January 1999) is an Australian professional soccer player who plays as a striker for Japanese side Sanfrecce Hiroshima on loan from Scottish Premiership club Aberdeen. He also represented the Australia national team.

== Early life ==
Kusini Boja Yengi was born on 15 January 1999 in Adelaide, South Australia, to Ben, a refugee advocate born in what is now South Sudan who emigrated to Australia in the early 1970s, and Emma Yengi, a European English-born primatologist.

== Club career ==
=== Adelaide United ===
On 21 February 2020, Yengi made his debut for Adelaide United coming on as a substitute in the 67th minute in a 5–2 defeat to the Western Sydney Wanderers, the club he would join two years later.

On 13 March 2021, he scored a goal and registered an assist against arch-rivals Melbourne Victory, with Yengi celebrating his goal by leaping over advertising hoardings and celebrating in front of Melbourne Victory supporters.

=== Western Sydney Wanderers ===
On 12 November 2022, Yengi, after an assist from Milos Ninkovic, scored the only goal to beat Sydney FC and win the Sydney Derby for the Western Sydney Wanderers, from then Yengi has scored in both Sydney Derbys at Allianz Stadium obtaining and assist from Amor Layouni.

=== Portsmouth ===
On 2 July 2023, Yengi signed for EFL League One club Portsmouth for an undisclosed fee. He scored the equaliser on his debut against Bristol Rovers on 5 August; the match finished 1–1. Three days later, he scored a brace in a 3–1 win over Forest Green Rovers in the first round of the EFL Cup.

He departed the club upon the expiration of his contract at the end of the 2024–25 season.

=== Aberdeen ===
On 8 June 2025, Yengi agreed to join Scottish Premiership club Aberdeen on a free transfer from 1 July. His only goal for the club came in a League Cup tie away to Greenock Morton.

On 29 January 2026, he joined J1 League club Cerezo Osaka on loan for the remainder of the season. However, he required thigh surgery and returned to Aberdeen. On 31 August 2026, he was loaned to another Japanese side, this time Sanfrecce Hiroshima.

== International career ==
Yengi received his first call-up to the Australia national team in November 2023 for the 2026 FIFA World Cup qualification match against Bangladesh and Palestine. He shared his squad selection with former Adelaide United teammates Craig Goodwin and Joe Gauci. He made his international debut for the Socceroos against Bangladesh in Melbourne on 16 November 2023, coming on as a 72nd minute substitute for Brandon Borrello.

Yengi was selected in Graham Arnold's squad for the 2023 AFC Asian Cup in Qatar, and played in a friendly match against Bahrain preceding the tournament. Yengi made his first appearance in the starting lineup for the Socceroos in their third match of the 2023 AFC Asian Cup, against Uzbekistan.

On 26 March 2024, Yengi scored his first international goal against Lebanon during the 2026 FIFA World Cup qualification match.

== Personal life ==
Yengi's younger brother, Tete Yengi, also plays as a forward in the J1 League, for Machida Zelvia on loan from Livingston in the Scottish Championship. Tete has previously played for the Newcastle Jets in the A-League and Ipswich Town in the EFL Championship.

== Career statistics ==
=== Club ===
As of match played 16 August 2025

Appearances and goals by club, season and competition
Club	Season	League			National cup (Note: Includes Australia Cup, FA Cup)		League cup (Note: Includes EFL Cup)		Other		Total	
Club	Season	Division	Apps	Goals	Apps	Goals	Apps	Goals	Apps	Goals	Apps	Goals
Adelaide United	2019–20	A-League	3	0	0	0	—		—		3	0
Adelaide United	2020–21	A-League	16	4	0	0	—		—		16	4
Adelaide United	2021–22	A-League Men	8	2	1	0	—		—		9	2
Adelaide United	Total		27	6	1	0	—		—		28	6
Western Sydney Wanderers	2022–23	A-League Men	18	4	0	0	—		—		18	4
Portsmouth	2023–24	League One	26	9	1	0	1	2	3 (Note: Appearances in EFL Trophy)	2	31	13
Portsmouth	2024–25	Championship	14	0	0	0	0	0	—		14	0
Portsmouth	Total		40	9	1	0	1	2	3	2	45	13
Aberdeen	2025–26	Scottish Premiership	3	0	0	0	1	1	—		3	1
Career total			87	19	2	0	1	2	3	2	91	23

=== International ===
Appearances and goals by national team and year
National team	Year	Apps	Goals
Australia	2023	1	0
Australia	2024	10	6
Total		11	6

Scores and results list Australia's goal tally first, score column indicates score after each Yengi goal.

List of international goals scored by Kusini Yengi
No.	Date	Venue	Opponent	Score	Result	Competition
1	26 March 2024	Canberra Stadium, Canberra, Australia	Lebanon	1–0	5–0	2026 FIFA World Cup qualification
2	6 June 2024	Bashundhara Kings Arena, Dhaka, Bangladesh	Bangladesh	2–0	2–0	2026 FIFA World Cup qualification
3	11 June 2024	Perth Rectangular Stadium, Perth, Australia	Palestine	1–0	5–0	2026 FIFA World Cup qualification
4	11 June 2024	Perth Rectangular Stadium, Perth, Australia	Palestine	3–0	5–0	2026 FIFA World Cup qualification
5	19 November 2024	Bahrain National Stadium, Riffa, Bahrain	Bahrain	1–0	2–2	2026 FIFA World Cup qualification
6	19 November 2024	Bahrain National Stadium, Riffa, Bahrain	Bahrain	2–2	2–2	2026 FIFA World Cup qualification

== Honours ==
Portsmouth

- EFL League One: 2023–24
