= LGBTQ rights in Qatar =

- Qatar
- Legal status: Illegal since 1938: Sharia (Islamic law) may be applied
- Penalty: Up to 7 years' imprisonment (de jure: death penalty, unenforced)
- Gender identity: No
- Military: No
- Discrimination protections: No protections

Family rights
- Recognition of relationships: No recognition of same-sex relationships
- Adoption: No

Lesbian, gay, bisexual, transgender, and queer (LGBTQ) people in Qatar experience legal persecution. Sexual acts between males and between females are illegal in Qatar, with punishment for both Muslims and non-Muslims of up to three years in prison. For Muslims duly convicted in the sharia courts, a judicial sentence of capital punishment for homosexuality is a possibility, though it has never been imposed. Abuse such as beatings and torture, and forced "conversion therapy" have also been used by police and other authorities.

Prevailing cultural mores in Qatar view homosexuality and cross-dressing negatively. The Qatari government does not recognise same-sex marriage or civil partnerships, nor does it allow people in Qatar to campaign for LGBTQ rights.

In November 2008 British performer George Michael performed at a successful concert in Qatar, making him the first openly gay musician to perform in Qatar.

On 4 February 2024, a dual British-Mexican citizen was arrested in Qatar after falling victim to a police-led Grindr fake profile. According to his brother, he had been denied the right to a lawyer and had been forced to sign documents in Arabic without a translator to assist him. He also stated that the man had also been prevented access to antiretroviral medicines he needed to be able to live with HIV.

In 2016, 2019, 2022 and 2025, Qatar voted against the United Nations independent expert on sexual orientation and gender identity at the United Nations Human Rights Council.

== Legality of same-sex sexual acts ==
Homosexuality was made illegal in British-controlled Qatar via the Indian Penal Code through the Order in Council 1938. This was replaced by Article 171 in 1956, and then after independence, Article 171 was replaced by Article 201 of Qatar's 1971 Penal Code. Since 2004, Article 296 of the current Penal Code (Law 11/2004) stipulates imprisonment between one and three years for sodomy. This is less severe than the 1971 law that stipulated up to five years' imprisonment for men and women found to be homosexual, penalizing specific acts rather than orientation itself. The local death penalty for same-gender sex is applicable only to Muslims because extramarital sex regardless of the gender of the participants is punishable by death and because same-gender couples cannot get married. However, there is no evidence that the death penalty has been applied for consensual same-sex relations taking place between adults outside the spaces policed by authorities.

In 1998, an American citizen visiting Qatar was sentenced to six months in prison and 90 lashes for homosexual activity. In the 1990s, the Philippine Overseas Employment Administration informed Philippine workers that gay workers were prohibited in Qatar. This was in response to several mass arrests and deportations of Philippine workers in Qatar for homosexuality.

In 2016, Polish Instagram star King Luxy was arrested in Qatar for allegedly being homosexual. He spent two months in custody before he was released. The Polish embassy claim he was arrested for extortion.

== Recognition of same-sex relationships ==
Qatari laws concerning marriage, divorce and other family matters are influenced by traditional Islamic morality. Hence, cohabitation is illegal and no legal recognition exists in Qatar for same-sex marriage, civil unions or domestic partnerships.

== Transgender rights ==
In Qatar, trans people can be arrested for the crime of "impersonating the opposite gender". Such individuals are often deemed to be "violating public morality" or infringing "community protection" laws and, as such, police may detain them for up to six months without trial or charge, on this suspicion. While detained, authorities attempt to enforce conformity to local social norms of male and female appearance by requiring physical detransition, such as surgical removal of breast tissue. Detainees are required to attend conversion "therapy" upon release, according to information received by the BBC. Qatari authorities "categorically rejected" the reports by the trans women who detailed their experiences.

== 2022 FIFA World Cup controversy ==
In 2010, shortly after Qatar was selected to host the 2022 FIFA World Cup, FIFA President Sepp Blatter was asked about the political reality for gay people in Qatar, and he responded that gay soccer fans in Qatar "should refrain from any sexual activities." After being criticised for this remark, Blatter added that: "we FIFA don't want any discrimination. What we want to do is open this game to everybody, and to open it to all cultures, and this is what we are doing in 2022".

In 2011, a member of the Dutch Parliament for the Party for Freedom (PVV) proposed that the Dutch soccer team play in pink, instead of the country's national color, orange, to protest the gay rights situation in Qatar.

In 2013, the head of Qatar's World Cup bid team, Hassan Al-Thawadi, said that everybody was welcome at the event, so long as they refrained from public display of affection. "Public display of affection is not part of our culture and tradition", he said. In 2013, Kuwait proposed banning gay foreigners from entering any of the countries of the Gulf Cooperation Council, and the GCC agreed to discuss it. However, the GCC backtracked, possibly due to concerns over the effect on Qatar's hosting of the 2022 World Cup.

In November 2021, the Australian soccer player Josh Cavallo, the league's only current player who is openly gay, said he would be afraid to travel to Qatar to play, to which Nasser Al Khater, head of the tournament's organizing committee, replied that Cavallo would be "welcome" in the country.

Qatari officials initially stated in December 2020 that, in accordance with FIFA's inclusion policy, it would not restrict the display of pro-LGBTQ imagery (such as rainbow flags) at matches during the World Cup. However, in April 2022, a senior security official overseeing the tournament stated that there were plans to confiscate pride flags from spectators—allegedly as a safety measure to protect them from altercations with spectators that are anti-LGBTQ. Fare network criticised the report, arguing that actions against the LGBTQ community by the state were of a greater concern to those attending the World Cup than the actions of individuals.

Major General Abdulaziz Abdullah al-Ansari, a senior official responsible for security for the tournament, warned in April 2022 that rainbow flags could be taken from fans to "protect" them from locals, and asked fans not to "come in and insult the whole society" by flying the flags. Rights organizations condemned the potential confiscation, and called claims that it will be done to protect fans a "smokescreen" and a "pretext". Al-Ansari stated that fans can "Reserve the room together, sleep together, this is something that's not in our concern ... We are here to manage the tournament. Let's not go beyond, the individual personal things of which might be happening between these people".

In May 2022, some hotels on FIFA's official list of recommended accommodations for the World Cup event were outright refusing to provide accommodations to same-sex couples. Other hotels on the list indicated they would accept reservations for same-sex couples as long as they hid their relationship in public. FIFA claimed that it would ensure that the hotels mentioned are once again made aware of the strict requirements in relation to welcoming guests in a non-discriminatory manner. During a press conference in Germany on May 20, the Emir of Qatar Sheikh Tamim bin Hamad Al Thani stated that the LGBTQ visitors would be welcomed to the 2022 World Cup but they need to respect the nation's culture.

In September 2022, according to a report by The Guardian, the Football Association (the FA) has assured LGBTQ couples will not face arrest while holding hands or kissing in public in Qatar. The FA has declared that fans with rainbow flags will not face arrest as long as they do not "disrespect" the local culture and norms by draping flags over mosques in Qatar.

An October 2022 report from Human Rights Watch alleges systemic police brutality against LGBTQ people in Qatar, based on eyewitness reports from 2019 to 2022.

Transport for London banned Qatar from advertising on London's bus, cab and tube systems after an outcry over the ban on European teams participating in the World Cup in Qatar wearing armbands supporting LGBTQ rights. Subsequently, Qatar said it was reviewing its current and future investments in London.

In 2022, Qatar police arrested protesters after they criticised Qatari law.

In October 2022, the Australian men's national team called for the host country to recognise same-sex marriage and improve migrant workers' rights. Qatar's spokesperson responded by commending the "soccer players (for) using their platforms to raise awareness for important matters", and stating no country is perfect, and every country has its challenges, also stating new laws and reform often takes time to bed-in, including in Australia.

On 22 November 2022, a Brazilian journalist was harassed by local police after they mistook his Brazilian state flag of Pernambuco for a pride flag. His work phone was confiscated after the journalist recorded the Qatari authorities confiscating his flag and stomping on it. His phone was returned only after he deleted the video he took.

== Living conditions ==
In 2016, an opinion piece that appeared in the outlet Doha News by a gay Qatari man under the pseudonym Majid Al-Qatari that described being gay in Qatar as "jarring" and spoke of the "irreparable damage to [his] mental health", was criticised for "allowing the topic of 'homosexuality' in Qatar to be discussed". It was met with extremely strong reactions.

In 2018, nine entire articles covering gay and transgender rights published from April to July, including a discussion of LGBTQ rights in Africa, criticism of the US military's transgender ban and a retrospective about a 1973 fire that killed 32 people at a New Orleans gay bar, were censored from the Doha edition of The New York Times International Edition. The Government Communications Office for the State of Qatar issued a statement pledging to investigate the matter.

In 2018, Tom Bosworth, an openly gay British race walker, said that he was ready to risk prison to defend LGBTQ rights in Qatar during the 2019 World Championships in Athletics. He finished seventh at the 2019 World Championships.

In June 2019, although the laws in Qatar still criminalise homosexuality, its international pubcaster Al Jazeera Media Network's AJ+ marked the month as LGBTQ Pride Month with a tweet about speaking to the cast of Queer Eye on LGBTQ issues. This led many online users to point out the paradox that AJ+ discusses and encourages recognition of gay rights outside Qatar, while Qatar censors LGBTQ content.

In February 2020, Northwestern University in Qatar cancelled an event featuring Mashrou' Leila following anti-LGBTQ backlash.

In December 2021 Nasser Al Khater, the CEO of the 2022 World Cup in Qatar, said that "Nobody feels threatened here, nobody feels unsafe here" but added that " ... public display of affection is frowned upon, and that goes across the board – across the board. Qatar is a modest country ... They [gay people] will be coming to Qatar as fans of a soccer tournament. They can do whatever any other human being would do. What I'm saying is Qatar, from a public-display-of-affection factor, is conservative". The tournament organiser also welcomed Josh Cavallo, the world's only current openly gay top-flight professional soccer player, at the World Cup. Cavallo had said that to know that the World Cup was being held " ... in a country that doesn't support gay people and puts us at risk of our own life, that does scare me and makes me re-evaluate – is my life more important than doing something really good in my career?".

In May 2022, Naser Mohamed, a physician and gay rights activist based in the US, became the first Qatari to publicly come out as a gay man. He told The Guardian that LGBTQ people in Qatar are held and physically abused by authorities, then are promised safety from further torture if they agree to work as agents and help authorities find other LGBTQ+ people.

In May 2023, Gilbert Ignatius, a Qatar Airways employee from Indonesia, was detained by Qatar's Criminal Investigation Department following Ignatius's birthday celebration. Officials who detained him cited his tinted moisturizer, designer brand clothing and bag as evidence of prostitution. An officer struck Ignatius when he asked to speak to the Indonesian embassy and told him "You have no rights. This is Qatar." Ignatius, who had lived in Doha for 6 years, was subsequently deported, fired, and banned from Qatar without official explanation. He told press that secret police crackdowns following the World Cup seem to especially target people who appear to be from Philippines, Indonesia, and Thailand.

In 2024, Manuel Guerrero Aviña, a Mexican-British citizen working for Qatar Airways, was arrested in Qatar after police officers impersonated a gay man on Grindr and arranged a "date" with him. Qatari officials claimed that he was arrested on drug charges, and that they did not even know about his sexuality until after the arrest, but his family retorted that he was not a drug user, that he was forced to sign documents that he did not understand in Arabic, and that he was interrogated about other gay men after the fake Grindr "date" arranged by the police. Aviña was released to await trial after 44 days in detention, and The UN’s Working Group on Arbitrary Detention expressed deep concerns about his treatment, including reported denial of access to life-saving HIV medication. Amnesty International called the case "nothing short of horrific", and expressed fears that he was coerced into providing information to authorities that could be used to hurt other LGBTQ people.

== Summary table ==
Same-sex sexual activity legal	No De facto: up to 7 years' imprisonment, fines, corporal punishment; deportation for foreign nationals. No De jure: (Capital punishment, unenforced)
Equal age of consent	No
Anti-discrimination laws in employment	No
Anti-discrimination laws in the provision of goods and services	No
Anti-discrimination laws in all other areas (including indirect discrimination, hate speech)	No
Same-sex marriages	No
Same-sex civil unions	No
Recognition of same-sex couples	No
Step-child adoption by same-sex couples	No
Joint adoption by same-sex couples	No
Homosexual people allowed to serve openly in the military	No
Right to change legal gender	No
Conversion therapy made illegal	No
Access to IVF for lesbians	No
Commercial surrogacy for gay male couples	No (Illegal for all couples regardless of sexual orientation)
Men who have sex with men allowed to donate blood	No

== See also ==
- Criminalization of homosexuality
- Human rights in Qatar
- LGBTQ people and Islam
- LGBTQ rights in Asia
- LGBTQ rights in the Middle East
