= Yaya Dukuly =

Australian soccer player

Personal information
- Date of birth: 17 January 2003 (age 23)
- Place of birth: Conakry, Guinea
- Height: 1.76 m (5 ft 9 in)
- Position: Winger

Team information
- Current team: Celje
- Number: 19

Youth career
- Para Hills Knights
- 2015–2017: FFSA NTC
- 2018: Melbourne City

Senior career*
Years	Team	Apps	(Gls)
2018–2020	Melbourne City NPL	13	(1)
2019–2020	Melbourne City	0	(0)
2020–2022	Adelaide United	14	(1)
2021–2022	Adelaide United NPL	12	(3)
2022–2024	Reims B	31	(2)
2024–2026	Adelaide United	47	(2)
2024	Adelaide United NPL	8	(3)
2026–	Celje	8	(1)

International career^{‡}
2019	Australia U17	2	(0)
2022–2023	Australia U20	2	(0)
2025–	Australia U23	6	(4)
- * Club domestic league appearances and goals as of 17 September 2026 ‡ National team caps and goals as of 14 January 2026

Yaya Dukuly (/ˈjɑ.jɑ ˈduː.ku.li/; born 17 January 2003) is a professional soccer player who plays as a winger for Slovenian PrvaLiga side Celje. Born a Liberian refugee in Guinea, he has represented Australia at youth level.

== Club career ==
=== Melbourne City ===
On 9 September 2019, Dukuly signed a two-year scholarship deal with Melbourne City. Dukuly made regular appearances for the club's youth side competing in the National Premier Leagues Victoria and Y-League. On 27 October 2020, Melbourne City announced that Dukuly had departed the club.

=== Adelaide United ===
Shortly after the announcement of Dukuly's departure from Melbourne City, Dukuly signed a one-year scholarship contract with Adelaide United ahead of the 2020–21 A-League season. Dukuly made his debut on 28 December 2020 in the opening A-League fixture against Western United where he was named in the starting lineup, he was later substituted in the 59th minute.

=== Reims ===
In June 2022, Dukuly joined French club Reims together with Adelaide United team-mate Mohamed Toure.

=== Return to Adelaide United ===
After failing to break into Reims' first team, Dukuly returned to Adelaide United in February 2024, signing a 2.5 year contract on deadline day.

=== Move to Celje ===
After 2 years at Adelaide United, Dukuly moved to Slovenian side Celje in July 2026 for an undisclosed fee.

== Personal life ==
Dukuly was born in Conakry, Guinea, to Liberian parents. He migrated to Australia at the age of one.

== Career statistics ==
=== Club ===
As of match played 27 December 2025

Appearances and goals by club, season and competition
Club	Season	League			Cup (Note: Includes Australia Cup)		Total	
Club	Season	Division	Apps	Goals	Apps	Goals	Apps	Goals
Melbourne City Youth	2018	NPL2 East Victoria	2	0	—		2	0
Melbourne City Youth	2019	NPL2 East Victoria	11	1	—		11	1
Melbourne City Youth	Total		13	1	—		13	1
Adelaide United Youth	2021	NPL SA	12	3	—		12	3
Adelaide United Youth	2022	NPL SA	6	4	—		6	4
Adelaide United Youth	Total		18	7	—		18	7
Adelaide United	2020–21	A-League Men	10	1	—		10	1
Adelaide United	2021–22	A-League Men	4	0	2	1	6	1
Adelaide United	Total		14	1	2	1	16	2
Reims B	2022–23	National 2	17	1	—		17	1
Reims B	2023–24	National 3	14	1	—		14	1
Reims B	Total		31	2	—		31	2
Adelaide United Youth	2024	NPL SA	8	3	—		8	3
Adelaide United	2023–24	A-League Men	3	0	—		3	0
Adelaide United	2024–25	A-League Men	20	1	4	1	24	2
Adelaide United	2025–26	A-League Men	10	0	1	0	11	0
Adelaide United	Total		33	1	5	1	38	2
Career total			117	15	7	2	124	17

== Honours ==
ASEAN All-Stars

- Maybank Challenge Cup: 2025
