= Al Hassan Touré =

Australian soccer player

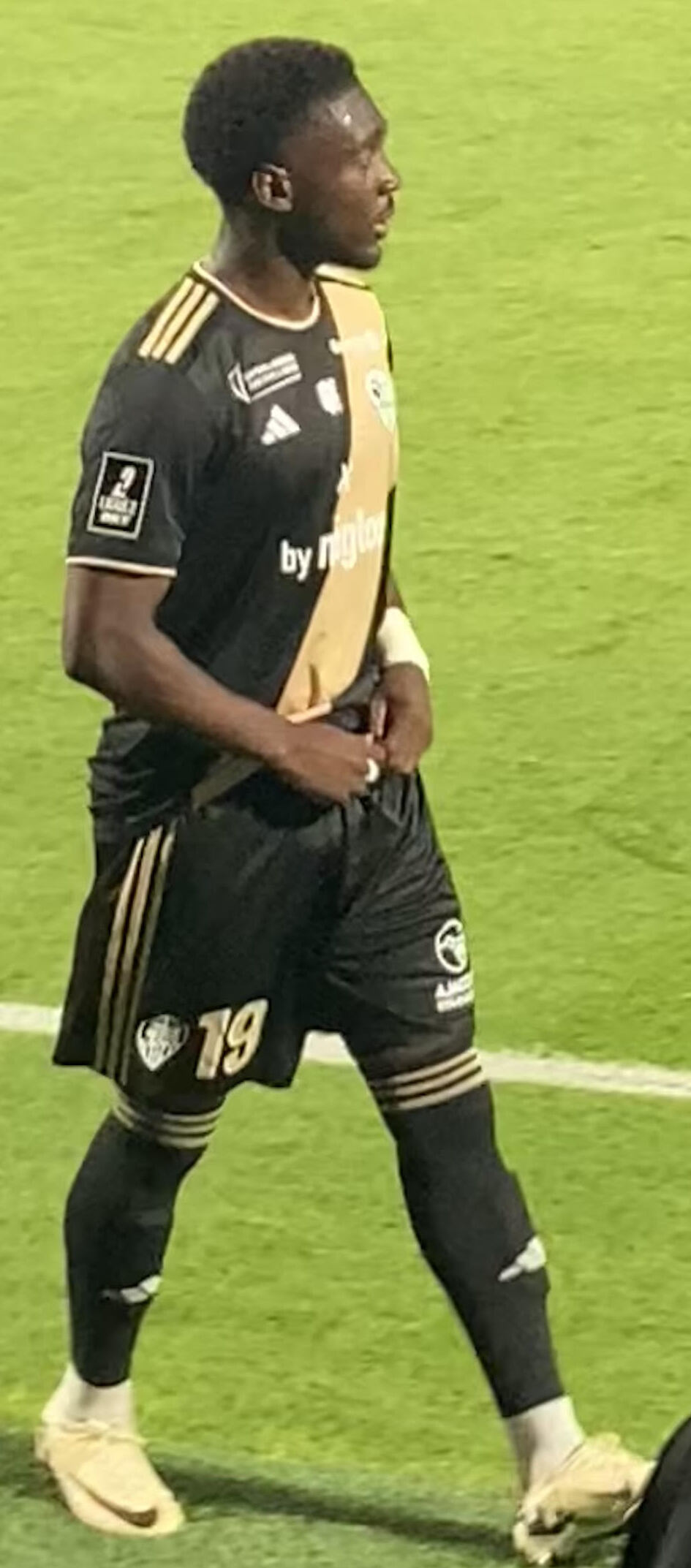
- Touré with Ajaccio in 2024

Personal information
- Date of birth: 30 May 2000 (age 26)
- Place of birth: Conakry, Guinea
- Height: 1.85 m (6 ft 1 in)
- Position: Forward

Team information
- Current team: Sydney FC
- Number: 35

Youth career
- 2015–2017: Croydon Kings

Senior career*
Years	Team	Apps	(Gls)
2017–2018	Croydon Kings	23	(1)
2018–2021	Adelaide United NPL	17	(8)
2019–2021	Adelaide United	30	(2)
2021–2023	Macarthur FC	45	(5)
2022	→ Northbridge (loan)	4	(1)
2023–2024	Eyüpspor	0	(0)
2023–2024	→ Şanlıurfaspor (loan)	16	(0)
2024–2025	Ajaccio	7	(0)
2024–2025	Ajaccio II	8	(4)
2025	FC Tulsa	3	(0)
2025–	Sydney FC	24	(9)

International career^{‡}
2019–2022	Australia U23	8	(3)
2025–	Australia	1	(0)
Medal record
Men's football
Representing Australia
AFC U-23 Asian Cup
Third place	2020 Thailand	U23 Team
- * Club domestic league appearances and goals as of 20:25, 11 November 2026 (UTC) ‡ National team caps and goals as of 15 November 2025

Al Hassan Touré (Mandingo: [ɑl hɑsːan tuɾe]; born 30 May 2000) is a professional soccer player who plays as a forward for A-League Men club Sydney FC. Born a Liberian refugee in Guinea, he plays for the Australia national team.

== Early life and family ==
Touré was born on 30 May 2000 in a refugee camp in Conakry, Guinea, the eldest of six children to Amara and Mawa Touré. Before his birth, his parents originally hailed from Frelah, a town in the Salala District of Liberia and belonged to the Mandingo ethnic group. They fled to Guinea during the Second Liberian Civil War, after the war had reached the town on the morning of 23 May 1990. Amara travelled for 18 days on foot before eventually resting in a refugee camp in Conakry where he met Mawa. During their 14-year stay at the camp, Al Hassan and his younger brother Mohamed were born. The Tourés moved to Australia on 26 November 2004, settling in South Australia where Al Hassan's uncle, Ali, was staying. They initially resided on Prospect Rd at Blair Athol before moving to Croydon and then to a three-bedroom home in Clearview, a northern suburb of Adelaide.

Growing up in a tight-knit Islamic family in the suburb of Croydon, Al Hassan spent a significant amount of time playing football with his two younger brothers, Mohamed and Musa, both of whom became professional footballers. His father, Amara, was Al Hassan's biggest influence, training him from his experiences as a semi-professional in Guinea and Liberia. He started his career to professional football with local club Croydon Kings, making his senior debut at the age of 16.

Touré has taken part in the African Nations Cup of South Australia.

Touré's goalscoring idol growing up was Cristiano Ronaldo, for his work ethic and leadership on the pitch.

== Club career ==
=== Adelaide United ===
On 7 August 2019, Touré made his professional debut against Melbourne Knights in the 2019 FFA Cup, scoring the opening goal as Adelaide won the match 5–2. Soon afterwards, Touré penned a two-year scholarship contract with the club. He continued his scoring form in Adelaide's Round of 16 clash against Olympic FC, with a first-half brace helping Adelaide to a 3–2 win. He scored again in the quarter-finals, pouncing on a Glen Moss error to score his fourth in three games as they beat the Newcastle Jets 1–0. On 23 October 2019, Touré scored the opening goal in Adelaide's 4–0 win over Melbourne City in the 2019 FFA Cup Final, being awarded the Mark Viduka Medal for his performance.

Touré scored his first A-League goal in a Round 1 clash against Sydney FC, slotting home Adelaide's second as they lost 3–2 at Coopers Stadium.

On 13 October 2021, Adelaide United announced that Touré would be departing the club.

=== Macarthur FC ===
On 13 October 2021, Macarthur FC announced that Touré had signed for the 2021–22 season. He would make his debut for the club on 5 December 2022, coming off the bench in a 1–0 win against the Central Coast Mariners at Campbelltown Stadium. Touré would later make his starting debut for the club six days later, in a 2–0 win against rivals Western Sydney Wanderers at CommBank Stadium. Touré would score his first goal for Macarthur FC in a 3–2 win against his former club Adelaide United on 19 February 2022 at Campbelltown Stadium.

Touré would score the opening goal in the 2022 Australia Cup final, helping Macarthur defeat Sydney United 58 2–0. Touré's five goals in the competition would see him named top goalscorer for the 2022 Australia Cup. Touré would finish the 2022–23 season as Macarthur's top goalscorer in all competitions.

On 13 June 2023, Macarthur FC announced that Touré would be departing the club at the end of his contact to pursue an overseas opportunity.

=== Şanlıurfaspor (loan) ===
After signing with Turkish club Eyüpspor, in July 2023 it was announced that Touré would be loaned to fellow TFF 1. Lig side Şanlıurfaspor for the 2023–24 season.

=== Ajaccio ===
On 15 January 2024, Touré signed with Ligue 2 side Ajaccio on a 18-month contact with an option for an additional year.

=== FC Tulsa ===
On 4 April 2025, FC Tulsa announced that Touré had signed with the club. Touré would depart the club three months later, with FC Tulsa announcing the mutual termination of his contract on 23 July 2025.

=== Sydney FC ===
On 24 July 2025, Touré returned to Australia signing a two-year deal with A-League Men side Sydney FC. On 29 July 2025, Touré would make his debut for Sydney against Western United at Ironbark Fields in the first round of the 2025 Australia Cup in which Sydney would win 1–0. Touré would score his first goal for the club in a 2–0 win at the Sydney United Sports Centre against Sydney United 58 on 10 August 2025, in the second round of the Australia Cup.

On 1 November 2025, Touré would score the first hat-trick of his career in round three of the 2025–26 A-League Men against the Newcastle Jets at McDonald Jones Stadium, Newcastle.

== International career ==
Touré was eligible to represent Liberia and Australia, choosing in November 2019 to play for the Australian U23's (the Olyroos) in a friendly tournament in China, and scored on debut. Touré played a big part in helping the Olyroos qualify for the 2020 Olympics for the first time in 12 years, scoring a crucial goal against Syria in the Quarter Finals of the 2020 AFC U-23 Championship, going on to win the game and qualifying a few days later in the 3rd Place Final.

On 7 November 2025, it was announced that Touré had been called up to the Australia national team. He would make his debut for the Socceroos, coming off the bench in the 78th minute in a 1–0 defeat against Venezuela at Shell Energy Stadium, Houston on 14 November 2025.

== Career statistics ==
=== Club ===
As of match played 6 November 2026

Appearances and goals by club, season and competition
Club	Season	League			National cup (Note: Includes Australia Cup, Turkish Cup, U.S. Open Cup)		Continental		Other		Total	
Club	Season	Division	Apps	Goals	Apps	Goals	Apps	Goals	Apps	Goals	Apps	Goals
Adelaide United	2019–20	A-League	12	2	5	5	—		—		17	7
Adelaide United	2020–21	A-League	18	0	0	0	—		—		18	0
Adelaide United	2021–22	A-League	0	0	1	0	—		—		1	0
Adelaide United	Total		30	2	6	5	—		—		36	7
Macarthur FC	2021–22	A-League Men	22	2	0	0	—		—		22	2
Macarthur FC	2022–23	A-League Men	23	3	5	5	—		—		28	8
Macarthur FC	Total		45	5	5	5	—		—		50	10
Şanlıurfaspor (loan)	2023–24	TFF 1. Lig	16	0	1	0	—		—		17	0
Ajaccio	2023–24	Ligue 2	6	0	0	0	—		—		6	0
Ajaccio	2024–25	Ligue 2	1	0	0	0	—		—		1	0
Ajaccio	Total		7	0	0	0	—		—		7	0
FC Tulsa	2025	USL Championship	3	0	1	0	—		1 (Note: Appearances in USL Cup)	0	5	0
Sydney FC	2025–26	A-League Men	20	5	2	1	—		—		22	6
Sydney FC	2026–27	A-League Men	4	4	3	0	—		—		7	4
Sydney FC	Total		24	9	5	1	—		—		29	10
Career total			125	16	18	11	0	0	1	0	144	27

=== International ===
As of 14 November 2025

Appearances and goals by national team and year
National team	Year	Apps	Goals
Australia	2025	1	0
Total		1	0

== Honours ==
Adelaide United

- FFA Cup: 2019

Macarthur FC

- Australia Cup: 2022

Individual

- Mark Viduka Medal: 2019

== Personal life ==
Touré enjoys playing video games such as Call of Duty, EA Sports FC and Fortnite.
