= Nas Mohamed =

Qatari physician and LGBTQ rights activist

Nasser "Nas" Mohamed is a physician from Qatar and a LGBT rights activist, founder of Alwan Foundation. In 2022, he became the first Qatari to publicly come out as a gay man and has sought to raise awareness of the persecution of LGBT people in Qatar in advance of the country hosting the 2022 FIFA World Cup. Mohamed has lived in the United States since 2011, where he practices as a physician.

== Early life and education ==
Mohamed was bought up in a rural area of Qatar, outside Doha, in a "very conservative low to middle-income family". He only spoke Arabic until he was a teenager and was not allowed to listen to music. He began to experience same-sex attraction from the age of 12, but lacked the vocabulary to express his feelings. Mohamed was religiously observant to Islam and studied the Quran and prayed a lot as a youth. He told his family that he was avoiding relationships until he completed his studies. He attended Weill Cornell Medical College in Qatar and also studied in New York.

== Awakening ==
His self-awareness occurred in Las Vegas as a medical student where he was due to do a presentation on trauma medicine. He felt instantly attracted to an attractive man that he walked past, and then researched same-sex attraction on the internet before finding a gay club on the Las Vegas Strip. He entered the club and became truly aware of his sexuality. Mohamed said that he subsequently " ... got very depressed. It consumed me. There are all these pieces that come together to give us our sense of self, and I felt like one piece was at odds with everything else. I didn't know what to do". He eventually returned to the United States from Qatar, feeling that living in Qatar was eroding his self-identity. He lived in Connecticut for several years while completing his residency and stopped speaking Arabic and cut ties with everyone except his family. With his visa expiring and his fears of returning to Qatar, he applied for asylum in the United States.

== Coming out ==
In May 2022, Mohamed became the first Qatari to publicly come out as a gay man. He purposely came out in May to raise awareness of LGBT rights in Qatar in advance of the country hosting the 2022 FIFA World Cup in November 2022. Mohamed was disinherited by his family after he had come out to them in 2015 and is estranged from them because of his sexuality. Mohamed has lived in the United States since 2011. He has since claimed asylum in the United States due to the persecution that he would face in his native Qatar due to his sexual orientation. He works as a physician in San Francisco.

== LGBT activism and Qatar ==
Mohamed has said that undercover police in Qatar arrest men in gay cruising places and then attempt to find other LGBT people through their contacts. He has also said that persecution of gay men in Qatar is more severe if they are effeminate or poor, and that torture and conversion therapy are also prevalent. Mohamed has claimed that LGBT people have been promised that they would be safe from torture if they helped the Qatari Preventive Security Department find other LGBT people. Mohamed has said that he is in contact with hundreds of LGBT Qatari people. Mohamed felt that the narrative around LGBT rights in Qatar was focused on Western visitors and their safety during the tournament, and that LGBT Qatari citizens were not part of the debate. After coming out, he received abuse and death threats through Instagram before he was contacted by LGBT Qataris who told their stories of honor killings, kidnappings and conversion therapy.

In 2022, Mohamed started the Alwan Foundation, a nonprofit organization that seeks to advance the human rights of LGBT people in the Middle East. He hopes that the organisation can work with Amnesty International and Human Rights Watch to interview LGBT people in the region. The same year, Mohamed founded Proud Maroons, a supporters club for LGBT fans of the Qatar national football team.

In a November 2022 interview with Time magazine, Mohamed spoke of his fears of persecution against LGBT people in Qatar before and after the 2022 FIFA World Cup, which is being held in the country. He also spoke of his fears that people with xenophobic and Islamophobic views would be emboldened by discussion of Qatari persecution of LGBT people.

In 2023 Mohamed featured in a documentary called The World According to Football in which Trevor Noah examined the investment by the government of Qatar in the 2022 FIFA World Cup and its human rights record. He also challenged David Beckham's account of his role with the FIFA World Cup in the documentary Beckham.

== LGBT activism in San Francisco ==
Mohamed wore a Rainbow sash over his traditional Qatari thawb at the San Francisco Pride parade in 2022. In 2023 he was a Grand Marshall of the San Francisco Pride Parade. He currently serves on the board of SF Pride.
