= Mohamed Touré (soccer, born 2004) =

Australian soccer player (born 2004)

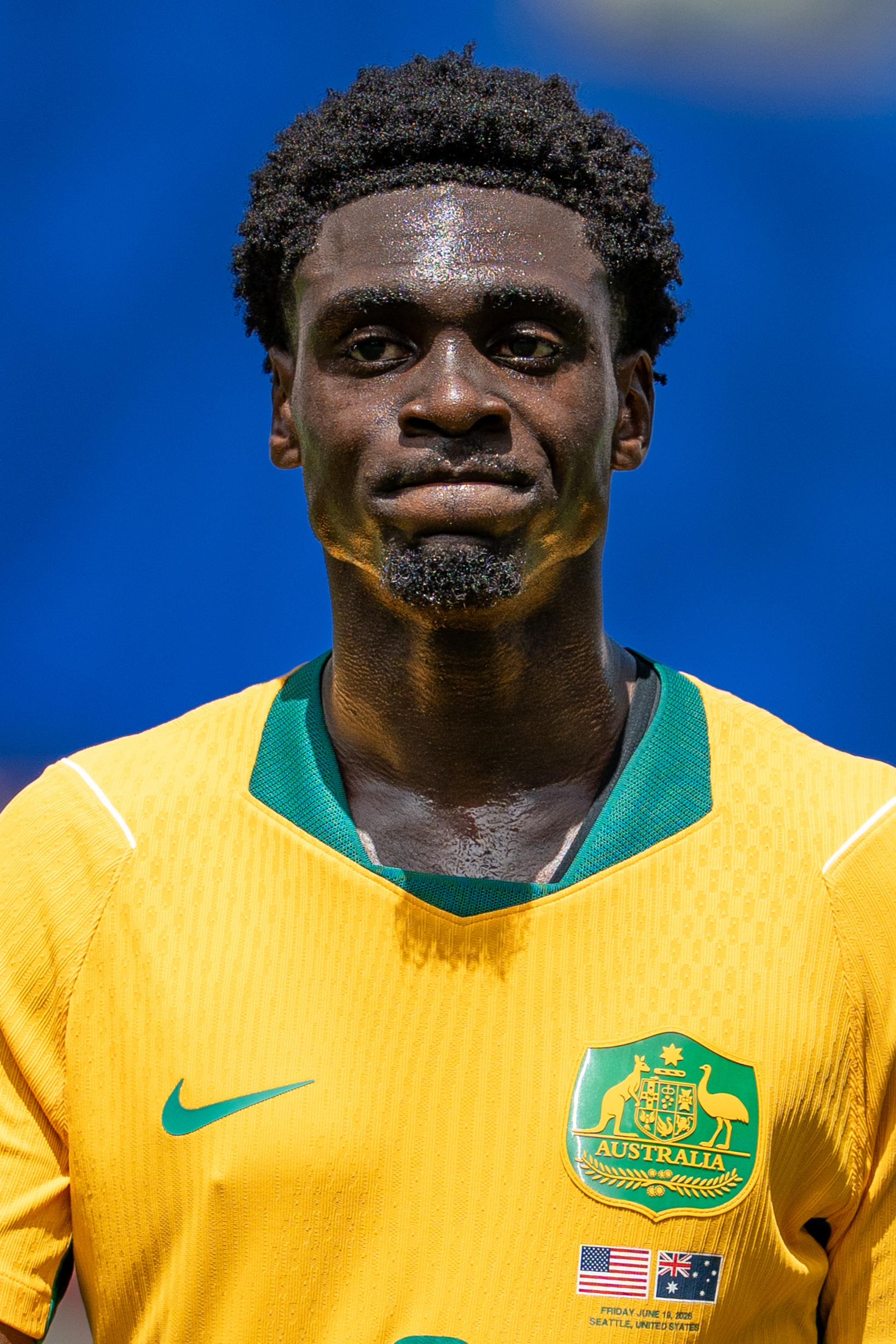
- Touré with Australia in 2026

Personal information
- Full name: Mohamed A. Touré
- Date of birth: 26 March 2004 (age 22)
- Place of birth: Conakry, Guinea
- Height: 1.86 m (6 ft 1 in)
- Position: Striker

Team information
- Current team: Norwich City
- Number: 21

Youth career
- 2015–2018: Croydon Kings
- 2019: SA NTC
- 2020: Adelaide United

Senior career*
Years	Team	Apps	(Gls)
2020–2022	Adelaide United NPL	21	(9)
2020–2022	Adelaide United	42	(7)
2022–2023	Reims B	15	(8)
2023–2024	Reims	3	(0)
2023–2024	→ Paris FC (loan)	10	(1)
2024–2026	Randers	44	(11)
2026–	Norwich City	18	(14)

International career^{‡}
2023–	Australia U23	5	(1)
2023–	Australia	13	(2)
- * Club domestic league appearances and goals as of 09:59, 23 September 2026 (UTC) ‡ National team caps and goals as of 3 July 2026

Mohamed A. Touré (moh-HAM-ed TOO-ray; born 26 March 2004) is an Australian professional soccer player who plays as a striker for Norwich City. Born a Liberian refugee in Guinea, he plays for the Australia national team.

He began his professional career at Adelaide United, making his debut and scoring his first goal for the club in February 2020, as the third youngest debutant and youngest goalscorer in A-League history at the age of 15. Following his breakthrough season, he joined Stade de Reims, initially playing in the reserves before making his first-team debut in May 2023.

== Early life and education ==
Mohamed A. Touré was born on 26 March 2004 in a refugee camp in Conakry, the capital of Guinea, the second oldest among seven siblings. His parents, Amara and Mawa Touré, were originally from Frelah, a town in the Salala District of Bong County, Liberia, and belonged to the Mandingo ethnic group. Displaced by the First Liberian Civil War, Touré's family fled to safety in Guinea when the war reached the town on 23 May 1990.

His family spent 14 years in a refugee camp before moving to Australia on 26 November 2004 when Touré was eight months of age. His family first settled on Prospect Road at Blair Athol, and later moved to Croydon and Clearview in South Australia. Touré grew up in an Islamic family. As a child, he spent his free time playing soccer with his brothers, Al Hassan and Musa, in the park across from their house. Touré spent most of his youth career with Croydon Kings, alongside his brothers.

== Club career ==
=== Adelaide United ===
Touré joined A-League club Adelaide United in 2020, starting in the youth squad that played in A-League Youth and NPL South Australia. On 8 February 2020, Touré made his A-League debut in a 2–1 win against Brisbane Roar becoming the third youngest debutant in the league at 15 years and 320 days old of age. He also became the second youngest debutant for Adelaide United. On 13 February 2020, Touré signed a three-year scholarship deal.

On 14 February 2020, Touré scored his first goal for the club in the 84th minute of a 2–0 home win against Central Coast Mariners. At the age of just 15 years and 325 days, he became the youngest goal scorer in the history of the A-League. In an Original Rivalry match, on 23 January 2021, Touré scored the winning goal to secure 1–0 win for his side by full time. On 2 April 2022, Touré was ruled for the rest of the 2021–22 season with a dislocated shoulder during the match against Melbourne Victory. It would be his last match for the team.

=== Reims ===
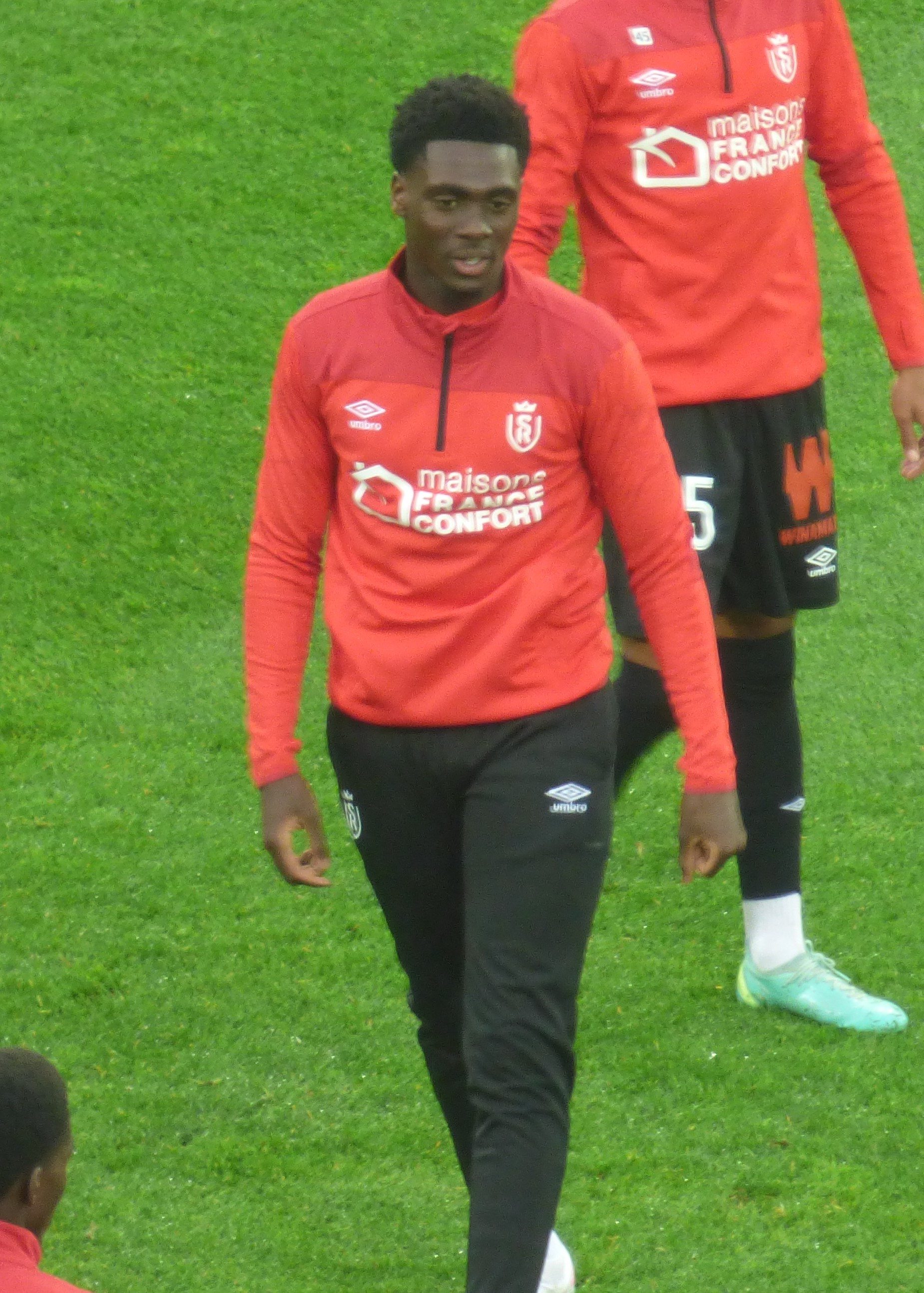
Touré with Reims in 2023

On 10 June 2022, Touré signed with Ligue 1 club Reims for an undisclosed fee. Touré was put in Reims B team that played in Championnat National 2. He showed impressive form for the reserve side, scoring eight goals in 14 league appearances and made his Ligue 1 debut for the first-team on 6 May 2023 in a 1–0 home win against Lille.

On 3 August, it was confirmed that Touré was sent on loan to Ligue 2 side Paris FC Touré made his debut on 13 August in a 2–0 defeat to Grenoble Foot at Stade des Alpes.

=== Randers FC ===
On 17 July 2024, Touré joined Danish Superliga club Randers FC on a four-year contract.

=== Norwich City ===
On 1 February 2026, Touré signed for Norwich City on a four-and-a-half-year contract. He later said that he had made the move "on a hunch", after receiving conflicting advice about the move and against his agent's advice.

He made his debut and scored in a 2–0 win over Blackburn Rovers on 7 February. Three days later, Touré made his full debut for the Canaries, scoring a hat-trick in a 3–0 victory over Oxford United, the first of his professional career. He became the first to score a hat-trick in his starting EFL debut since Jesse Lingard in 2013, and the first Australian to score any hat-trick in the EFL since Scott McDonald in 2011. In the following match on 14 February, Touré scored for a third successive game in a 3–1 win over West Bromwich Albion in the FA Cup. A total of five goal contributions in his first four league matches saw him named EFL Young Player of the Month for February. Touré scored a second hat-trick of the season in a 4–2 win over Bristol City at Ashton Gate on 18 April.

On 6 August 2026, Touré requested to change his squad number from 37 to 21 for the 2026–27 season after teammate Ali Ahmed suffered an anterior cruciate ligament injury during pre-season. In September, he suffered a shoulder injury which required surgery and Norwich manager Philippe Clement expected him to miss several months.

== International career ==
In August 2023, Touré received his first call-up for the Australia men's national under-23 soccer team for the AFC U-23 Asian Cup qualifiers.

He was again called up to the squad for the Soccer Ashes series against New Zealand in September 2025. On 5 September, in the first match of the Soccer Ashes, Touré assisted Max Balard for an 87th-minute winner in a 1–0 victory at Canberra Stadium. In the second leg, Touré scored his first international goals for Australia, a brace in a 3–1 win at Mount Smart Stadium, securing the Ashes for the Socceroos.

Touré was selected to be a part of Australia's 26-man squad for the upcoming 2026 FIFA World Cup, one of five players from Adelaide in the team.

== Style of play ==
Touré is a skilful forward who utilises his pace and physical strength effectively in the attacking third. He is capable of scoring goals in various styles and also enjoys contributing to the build-up play. At Adelaide United, he often received the ball near the line, using his pace and strength to beat defenders and deliver the ball into the box for his teammates. Touré's impressive physique, speed, and dribbling skills allow him to carry the ball for long distances without being dispossessed, sometimes resulting in fouls being the only way to stop him.

== Personal life ==
=== Family ===
Touré has an older brother, Al Hassan Toure, and a younger brother, Musa Toure (in 2025 also playing at Randers) who both had made league appearances with Adelaide United. He also has a sister, Mariam, who plays in the South Australian women's football league. His father was also a footballer in Guinea before taking the role of a teacher and an uncle who had played in NPL South Australia.

=== Philanthropy ===
On 22 June 2023, Touré, alongside Croydon's technical director Mark Brazzale, arranged a charity match involving Australian football players of African descent in order to inspire African kids to play football and raise money to pay for the kids' fees in football. The game involved the likes of his two brothers, Al Hassan and Musa, Panashe Madanha, Charles M'Mombwa, and Yaya Dukuly whilst the kits were supplied by Awer Mabil.

== Career statistics ==
=== Club ===
As of match played 19 September 2026

Appearances and goals by club, season and competition
Club	Season	League			National cup (Note: Includes Australia Cup, Coupe de France, Danish Cup, FA Cup)		League cup (Note: Includes EFL Cup)		Other		Total	
Club	Season	Division	Apps	Goals	Apps	Goals	Apps	Goals	Apps	Goals	Apps	Goals
Adelaide United	2019–20	A-League	9	1	0	0	—		—		9	1
Adelaide United	2020–21	A-League	15	3	0	0	—		—		15	3
Adelaide United	2021–22	A-League	18	3	2	0	—		—		20	3
Adelaide United	Total		42	7	2	0	0	0	0	0	44	7
Reims B	2022–23	Championnat National 2	14	8	—		—		—		14	8
Reims	2022–23	Ligue 1	3	0	0	0	—		—		3	0
Paris FC (loan)	2023–24	Ligue 2	10	1	1	0	—		—		11	1
Randers	2024–25	Danish Superliga	28	7	1	1	—		—		29	8
Randers	2025–26	Danish Superliga	17	4	2	0	—		—		19	4
Randers	Total		45	11	3	1	0	0	0	0	48	12
Norwich City	2025–26	Championship	11	9	1	1	—		—		12	10
Norwich City	2026–27	Championship	7	5	0	0	2	1	—		9	6
Norwich City	Total		18	14	1	1	2	1	0	0	21	16
Career total			132	41	7	2	2	1	0	0	141	44

=== International ===
As of match played 3 July 2026

Appearances and goals by national team and year
National team	Year	Apps	Goals
Australia	2023	1	0
Australia	2024	0	0
Australia	2025	5	2
Australia	2026	7	0
Total		13	2

Scores and results list Australia's goal tally first, score column indicates score after each Touré goal.

List of international goals scored by Mohamed Touré
No.	Date	Venue	Cap	Opponent	Score	Result	Competition
1	9 September 2025	Mount Smart Stadium, Auckland, New Zealand	4	New Zealand	1–0	3–1	2025 Soccer Ashes
2	9 September 2025	Mount Smart Stadium, Auckland, New Zealand	4	New Zealand	3–1	3–1	2025 Soccer Ashes

== Honours ==
Individual

- EFL Young Player of the Month: February 2026
