= Yared Abetew =

Australian professional soccer player

Personal information
- Full name: Yared Abetew
- Date of birth: 15 June 1999 (age 27)
- Place of birth: Adelaide, Australia
- Height: 1.80 m (5 ft 11 in)
- Positions: Centre-back; defensive midfielder

Team information
- Current team: Adelaide City

Youth career
- White City
- 2016–2017: Croydon Kings

Senior career*
Years	Team	Apps	(Gls)
2017–2018	Croydon Kings	14	(0)
2019–2021	Adelaide United NPL	34	(1)
2019–2021	Adelaide United	9	(0)
2021	Newcastle Olympic	3	(0)
2022	Green Gully	24	(3)
2023	FK Beograd	16	(3)
2024–	Adelaide City	20	(4)
- * Club domestic league appearances and goals as of 18 September 2024 ‡ National team caps and goals as of 20 October 2019

Yared Abetew (born 15 June 1999), is an Australian professional soccer player who plays as a defender for National Premier Leagues Victoria club Green Gully.

== Club career ==
=== Adelaide United ===
On 20 October 2019, Abetew made his debut in the A-League, against Melbourne City in a 2–1 loss which involved an ankle injury forcing him substituting off at half-time. At age 21, he was promoted to the senior squad for the 2020–21 A-League season on 28 December 2020.

== Personal life ==
Born in Australia, Abetew is of Ethiopian descent.

== Career statistics ==
=== Club ===
As of match played 27 July 2022.

Appearances and goals by club, season and competition
Club	Season	League			Domestic Cup		Continental		Other		Total	
Club	Season	Division	Apps	Goals	Apps	Goals	Apps	Goals	Apps	Goals	Apps	Goals
Croydon Kings	2017	NPL South Australia	1	0	1	0	—		0	0	2	0
Croydon Kings	2018	NPL South Australia	13	0	0	0	—		0	0	13	0
Croydon Kings	Total		14	0	1	0	0	0	0	0	15	0
Adelaide United NPL	2019	NPL South Australia	14	1	—		—		—		14	1
Adelaide United NPL	2020	NPL South Australia	12	0	—		—		—		12	0
Adelaide United NPL	2021	NPL South Australia	8	0	—		—		—		8	0
Adelaide United NPL	Total		34	1	—		—		—		34	1
Adelaide United	2019–20	A-League	1	0	0	0	—		0	0	1	0
Adelaide United	2020–21	A-League	8	0	0	0	—		0	0	8	0
Adelaide United	Total		9	0	0	0	0	0	0	0	9	0
Newcastle Olympic	2021	NPL Northern New South Wales	3	0	0	0	—		—		3	0
Green Gully	2022	NPL Victoria	19	2	4	0	—		—		23	2
Career total			79	3	4	0	0	0	0	0	84	3
