= Bernardo Oliveira (soccer) =

Australian football player (born 2004)

Bernardo
Personal information
- Full name: Bernardo Lanção Oliveira
- Date of birth: 16 March 2004 (age 22)
- Place of birth: Rio de Janeiro, Rio de Janeiro, Brazil
- Height: 1.71 m (5 ft 7 in)
- Position: Winger

Team information
- Current team: Macarthur FC
- Number: 11

Youth career
- –2015: Port Adelaide Pirates
- 2016: Adelaide Olympic
- 2017–2019: FFSA NTC
- 2019–2021: Melbourne City

Senior career*
| Years | Team | Apps | (Gls) |
| 2019–2021 | Melbourne City NPL | 2 | (0) |
| 2019–2021 | Melbourne City | 0 | (0) |
| 2021–2024 | Adelaide United NPL | 21 | (3) |
| 2021–2024 | Adelaide United | 31 | (5) |
| 2024– | Macarthur FC | 24 | (5) |

International career^{‡}
| 2019 | Australia U17 | 9 | (3) |
| 2023 | Australia U20 | 4 | (2) |
| 2022– | Australia U23 | 3 | (0) |
- * Club domestic league appearances and goals as of 26 December 2025 ‡ National team caps and goals as of 31 March 2023

Bernardo Lanção Oliveira (Brazilian Portuguese: [beʁˈnaɾdu lɐ̃ˈsɐ̃w oliˈvejɾɐ]; born 16 March 2004), known mononymously as Bernardo, is a professional soccer player who plays as a winger for Macarthur FC. Born in Brazil, he represents Australia at youth level.

== Early life ==
Oliveira was born on 16 March 2004 in Rio de Janeiro, Rio de Janeiro State. He is the son of former Adelaide United player Cássio Oliveira.

== Club career ==
=== Youth career ===
Bernardo played youth football in South Australia with Port Adelaide Pirates and Adelaide Olympic.

=== Melbourne City ===
After impressing whilst playing the youth leagues of NPL South Australia, Bernardo signed for Melbourne City on a scholarship contract, on 7 November 2019, being regarded by City director Michael Petrillo as "one of the best players in the 2004 crop of Australian players". During his time at City, he broke into the Melbourne City NPL squad in 2021, making 2 league appearances in NPL Victoria 3 before the league cut short due to COVID.

=== Adelaide United ===
On 12 April 2021, Bernardo moved back to Adelaide to join with Adelaide United signing a scholarship contract that would expire in 2023. This made him the second player whose father had previously played for the club, following Domenic Costanzo in 2020. Bernardo made his professional club debut in a 3–1 win over Floreat Athena in the 2021 FFA Cup Round of 32. He scored on his A-League debut, on 12 February 2022, in a 1-1 draw against Wellington Phoenix equalising for his team by full time.

Bernardo extended his contract with Adelaide at the conclusion of 2021–22 A-League season, with a set date to expire in 2025. At the beginning of the 2022–23 season, Bernardo suffered a fracture on his right fifth metatarsal bone during international break which led him to receive surgery and took him out for the rest of the season.

Bernardo's contract was mutually terminated on 16 January 2024, with one year remaining, to "pursue another opportunity." The same day he signed with A-League Men club Macarthur FC.

== International career ==
Born in Brazil and moved to Australia at the age of three, Bernardo is eligible for both Brazil and Australia.

After recovering from his injury, Bernardo was called up to Australia U20 for the 2023 AFC U-20 Asian Cup despite not having played in any league matches before.
