= Asad Kasumovic =

Australian soccer player

Personal information
- Full name: Asad Kasumovic
- Date of birth: 28 August 2001 (age 25)
- Place of birth: Australia
- Position: Forward

Team information
- Current team: Adelaide City
- Number: 47

Youth career
- Parafield Gardens
- Adelaide City
- Croydon Kings
- West Adelaide

Senior career*
Years	Team	Apps	(Gls)
2019–2020	West Adelaide	26	(13)
2021	Adelaide City	25	(6)
2022–2023	Adelaide United NPL	23	(10)
2022–2023	Adelaide United	8	(0)
2024–2025	Oakleigh Cannons	45	(8)
2026–	Adelaide City	23	(10)
- * Club domestic league appearances and goals as of 11 September 2026

Asad Kasumovic (born 28 August 2001) is an Australian professional soccer player who plays as a striker for Adelaide City in NPL South Australia and former A-League players for Adelaide United.
