= Joe Gauci =

Australian soccer player (born 2000)

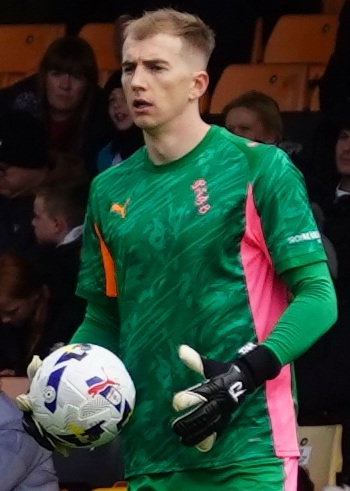
- Gauci playing for Port Vale in 2025

Personal information
- Full name: Joe Anthony Gauci
- Date of birth: 4 July 2000 (age 26)
- Place of birth: Adelaide, Australia
- Height: 1.94 m (6 ft 4 in)
- Position: Goalkeeper

Team information
- Current team: Lincoln City (on loan from Aston Villa)
- Number: 46

Youth career
- 2004–2011: Waiheke United
- 2011: Cumberland United
- 2011–2015: FFSA NTC
- 2015–2017: Cumberland United

Senior career*
Years	Team	Apps	(Gls)
2017–2018	West Torrens Birkalla	31	(0)
2018–2019	Central Coast Mariners	0	(0)
2018–2019	CCM Academy	5	(0)
2019	Adelaide City	8	(0)
2019–2020	Melbourne City	0	(0)
2020–2024	Adelaide United	71	(0)
2021	Adelaide United NPL	2	(0)
2024–	Aston Villa	0	(0)
2025	→ Barnsley (loan)	7	(0)
2025–2026	→ Port Vale (loan)	34	(0)
2026–	→ Lincoln City (loan)	0	(0)

International career^{‡}
2022	Australia U23	5	(0)
2023–	Australia	8	(0)
- * Club domestic league appearances and goals as of 20:47, 8 September 2026 (UTC) ‡ National team caps and goals as of 20 September 2025

Joe Anthony Gauci (Maltese: [ˈɡaʊ.t͡ʃɪ]; born 4 July 2000) is an Australian professional soccer player who plays as a goalkeeper for EFL Championship club Lincoln City, on loan from Premier League club Aston Villa. He also represents the Australia national team.

Gauci began his professional career when he received a scholarship deal with Central Coast Mariners in June 2018. He subsequently joined Adelaide City and Melbourne City before signing a scholarship contract with Adelaide United in October 2020. He made his A-League debut in March 2021 and went on to make 76 appearances for Adelaide before he was signed for an undisclosed fee by English Premier League club Aston Villa in January 2024. He spent the second part of the 2024–25 season on loan at Barnsley and was loaned to Port Vale for the 2025–26 campaign and then Lincoln City the following season.

Internationally, Gauci has made seven appearances for the Australia national team. He received his first call-up in 2022 as a train-on player and made his debut in a friendly match against Ecuador in 2023.

== Early life ==
Gauci was born on 4 July 2000 in Adelaide, Australia to parents of Maltese descent. At the age of four, Gauci moved to Waiheke Island, New Zealand after his mother was posted as a general manager for Kangaroo Island SeaLink. While living in New Zealand, Gauci joined local club Waiheke United at youth level in 2004 and, with his brother, traveled by ferry to Auckland where he started playing football as a striker. Gauci began playing as a goalkeeper during a school football camp in New Zealand. He returned to South Australia at age 11 and attended Sacred Heart College.

Gauci joined Cumberland United after a successful trial. During his time at the Clarence Gardens outfit, he represented South Australia in an under-14s national competition held at Coffs Harbour. He eventually joined the National Training Centre program, where he was coached by Carl Veart.

== Club career ==
=== Early career ===
At 16 years old, Gauci caught the attention of scouts while captaining West Torrens Birkalla's under-18s in the National Premier Leagues (NPL). Gauci led his team to the title, triumphing over Adelaide City in the final. In February 2018, Gauci went on trial with Central Coast Mariners. Although he was not offered a contract, the club invited him for another week of training in May. He signed a two-year scholarship contract with the Mariners on 19 June 2018. After being released a year later, Gauci signed with Adelaide City mid-season of the NPL South Australia in June 2019. He made eight league appearances in the 2019 season. On 9 September, Gauci signed a scholarship contract with Melbourne City where he took part in the club's youth teams. He was an unused substitute in the 2020 A-League Grand final defeat to Sydney FC.

=== Adelaide United ===
On 7 October 2020, Gauci signed a scholarship deal with his hometown club Adelaide United. As first-choice goalkeeper James Delianov was ruled out due to failing his fitness test, Gauci made his professional debut on 13 March 2021 in a 3–1 away victory against Melbourne Victory. He kept his first clean sheet in the league 15 days later in a 1–0 win over Sydney FC. The match was Adelaide's sixth consecutive win of the 2020–21 season, matching the club record in the 2005–06 season. Carl Veart, the head coach of Adelaide United, praised Gauci's performance during the team's success. On 13 May, Gauci suffered a thigh injury during a warm-up session before a match against Melbourne City, which ruled him out for the remainder of the season. He made ten league appearances during the 2020–21 season, keeping three clean sheets, and extended his contract for two years on 25 May.

In the 2021–22 season, Gauci went seven-months without an appearance and was ruled out at the start of the new year with COVID-19. He made his first appearance for the season, as to replace Delianov who sustained an injury mid-season, against Melbourne Victory on 8 January. He signed a three-year contract extension on 13 April 2023.

In the 2022–23 season, Adelaide United progressed to the A-League finals series. In the elimination final, Gauci kept his first clean sheet in 13 matches, in a 2–0 win over Wellington Phoenix on 5 May. Adelaide United ended the season with a loss in the semi-final leg against Melbourne City. He was voted onto the A-League Men PFA Team of the Season, having stopped 146 efforts on goal, including three penalties for a save percentage of 73%.

In February 2024, midway through the 2023–24 season, Gauci departed Adelaide United with a total of 76 appearances and 16 clean sheets.

=== Aston Villa ===
On 1 February 2024, Gauci signed for English club Aston Villa of the Premier League for an undisclosed fee. The fee was reported to be around $2.5m (around £1.29m). It was confirmed that the player would join up with his new club after the end of Australia's involvement in the ongoing Asian Cup. Gauci was on the bench for the February 2024 game against Nottingham Forest. The 24-year-old made his Aston Villa debut on 24 September 2024, starting an EFL Cup win away at Wycombe Wanderers. Unai Emery had him compete with 34-year-old Robin Olsen to be Emiliano Martínez's backup.

On 30 January 2025, Gauci joined League One side Barnsley on loan for the remainder of the season. Head coach Darrell Clarke said the Australian would be Barnsley's first-choice goalkeeper. On 1 February, Gauci got a clean sheet in his first appearance in the English Football League, a 0–0 draw with Burton Albion at Oakwell. However, he was sidelined with a hip injury after four games and 20-year-old Kieren Flavell impressed new head coach Conor Hourihane in his absence. Gauci played three further games for Barnsley in the remainder of the 2024–25 season.

On 11 August 2025, Gauci returned to League One, joining Port Vale on a season-long loan after Ben Amos picked up an injury. Manager Darren Moore gave Gauci his debut at Vale Park 12 days later, dropping number one Marko Maroši to the bench for a 1–0 league defeat to Doncaster Rovers. He was named on the League One Team of the Week for his performance in a 2–0 victory at Exeter City on 13 September. Readers of The Valiant substack voted him as their Player of the Month for October. He continued to pick up good reviews, though Gauci acknowledged that he needed to improve his distribution skills. He spent a month on the bench before being restored to the starting line-up by new manager and fellow countryman Jon Brady. On 14 April, he saved a penalty in a 0–0 draw with Barnsley to help the Valiants to move off the bottom of the table for the first time in five months. The team went on to be relegated despite a strong defensive record in the 2025–26 season.

On 28 July 2026, Gauci signed a season-long loan at Championship club Lincoln City for the duration of the 2026–27 season. He made his debut in the EFL Cup second round, starting the game against Blackpool.

== International career ==
Other than Australia, Gauci was eligible to represent New Zealand and Malta at international level. In March 2022, he received his first call-up to the Australia national team as a train-on player for the first week of camp, in preparation for the World Cup qualification matches against Japan and Saudi Arabia. Gauci received his first official call-up to the Australia national team ahead of two friendly matches against Ecuador. During the second friendly match on 28 March, the 21-year-old earned his first international appearance, starting in Australia's 2–1 defeat at Marvel Stadium. He played well, making eight saves, including two crucial reflex stops. In January 2024, head coach Graham Arnold named Gauci in the squad for the 2023 AFC Asian Cup. He was an unused substitute in the quarter-finals defeat to South Korea. New head coach, Tony Popovic, began to use Gauci as his first preference over veteran goalkeeper Mathew Ryan in October 2024. Gauci played five 2026 FIFA World Cup qualification matches before Ryan won back his starting place. Australia qualified, but Gauci was not selected in the squadlist for the tournament.

== Style of play ==
Gauci plays well as an all-round goalkeeper with solid command of his area, though he has struggled with his kicking.

== Personal life ==
Gauci has a younger brother, Jed, who plays for The Cove in State League 2 South Australia. The two played against each other for the first time on 18 July 2023, where Adelaide United won 8–1 over The Cove.

In April 2022, Gauci became an ambassador for the Childhood Cancer Association (CCA) in supporting local children with cancer and their families. Gauci vowed to contribute a sum of $20 for every save he made throughout an entire season. As of May 2023, he had donated $1,920 to the association.

== Career statistics ==
=== Club ===
As of 8 September 2026

Appearances and goals by club, season and competition
Club	Season	League			National cup (Note: Includes Australia Cup and FA Cup)		League cup (Note: Includes EFL Cup)		Other		Total	
Club	Season	Division	Apps	Goals	Apps	Goals	Apps	Goals	Apps	Goals	Apps	Goals
Central Coast Mariners	2018–19	A-League	0	0	0	0	—		—		0	0
Melbourne City	2019–20	A-League	0	0	0	0	—		0	0	0	0
Adelaide United	2020–21	A-League	10	0	0	0	—		0	0	10	0
Adelaide United	2021–22	A-League	19	0	3	0	—		3 (Note: Appearance(s) in the A-League Men finals series)	0	25	0
Adelaide United	2022–23	A-League	26	0	2	0	—		3	0	31	0
Adelaide United	2023–24	A-League	10	0	—		—		—		10	0
Adelaide United	Total		65	0	5	0	—		6	0	76	0
Aston Villa	2023–24	Premier League	0	0	0	0	—		0	0	0	0
Aston Villa	2024–25	Premier League	0	0	0	0	2	0	0	0	2	0
Aston Villa	2025–26	Premier League	0	0	0	0	0	0	0	0	0	0
Aston Villa	2026–27	Premier League	0	0	0	0	0	0	0	0	0	0
Aston Villa	Total		0	0	0	0	2	0	0	0	2	0
Barnsley (loan)	2024–25	EFL League One	7	0	—		—		—		7	0
Port Vale (loan)	2025–26	EFL League One	34	0	5	0	2	0	0	0	41	0
Lincoln City (loan)	2026–27	EFL Championship	0	0	0	0	2	0	—		2	0
Career total			106	0	10	0	6	0	6	0	128	0

=== International ===
As of match played 9 September 2025

Appearances and goals by national team and year
National team	Year	Apps	Goals
Australia	2023	1	0
Australia	2024	6	0
Australia	2025	1	0
Total		8	0

== Honours ==
Individual

- PFA A-League Team of the Season: 2022–23

Melbourne City

- A-League Men Grand Final runner-up: 2020
