= Pacifique Niyongabire =

Burundian footballer (born 2000)

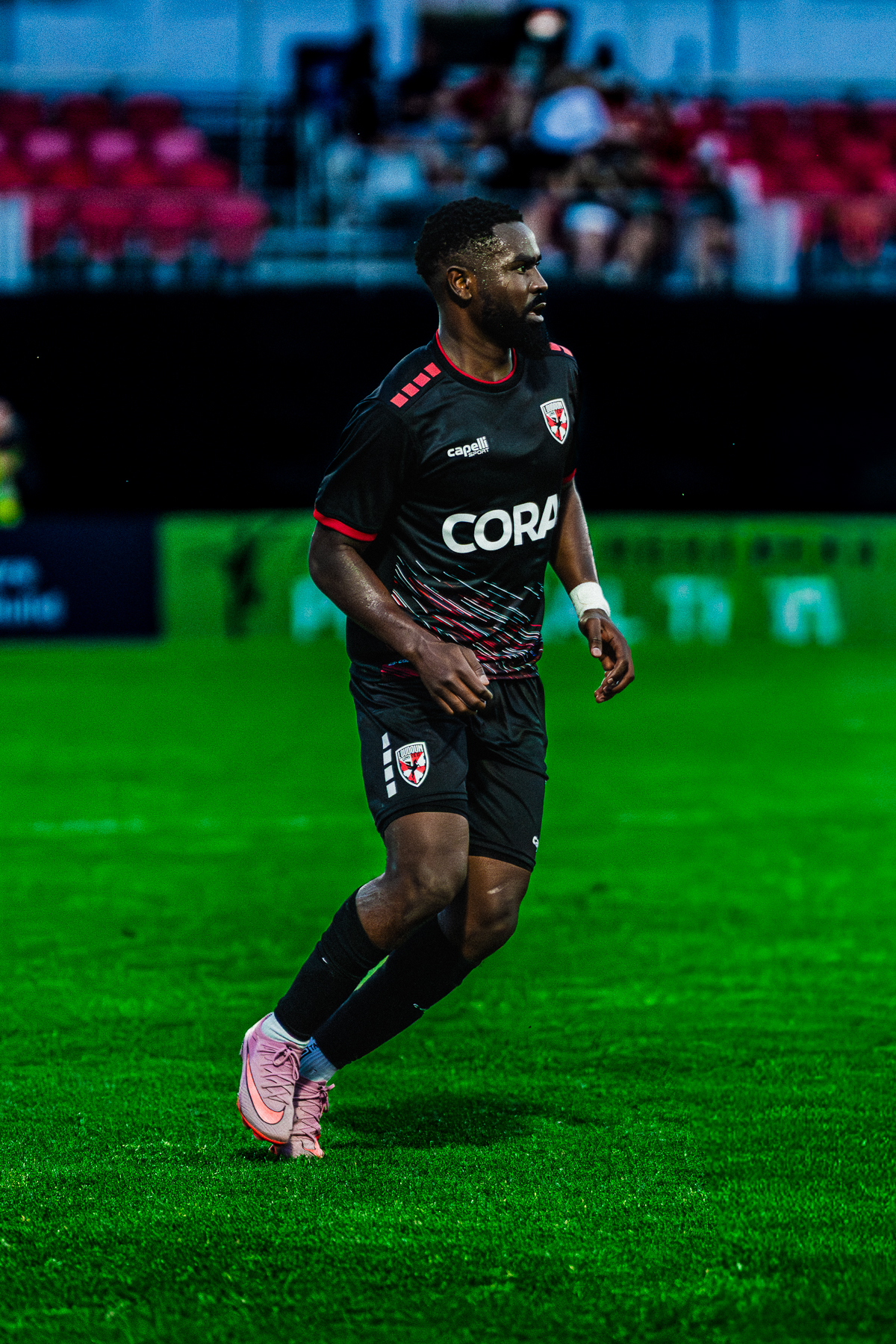
- Niyongabire with Loudoun United FC in 2026

Personal information
- Date of birth: 15 March 2000 (age 26)
- Place of birth: Bujumbura, Burundi
- Height: 1.73 m (5 ft 8 in)
- Position: Winger

Team information
- Current team: Loudoun United
- Number: 7

Youth career
- Playford City Patriots
- Gawler Eagles
- 2017–2019: Adelaide United

Senior career*
Years	Team	Apps	(Gls)
2017–2021	Adelaide United NPL	56	(25)
2018–2021	Adelaide United	20	(1)
2021–2022	Perth Glory	17	(0)
2023	Valour FC	25	(1)
2024–2025	Tampa Bay Rowdies	37	(1)
2026–	Loudoun United	23	(0)

International career^{‡}
2022–	Burundi	5	(1)
- * Club domestic league appearances and goals as of 31 October 2026 ‡ National team caps and goals as of 12 September 2023

Pacifique Niyongabire (born 15 March 2000) is a Burundian professional footballer who plays as a winger for the Loudoun United FC in the USL Championship and the Burundi national team.

== Early life ==
Niyongabire was born in Burundi, and spent his early childhood in Tanzania, before migrating to Australia with his family at age seven. In Australia, he played youth football with the Playford City Patriots and Gawler, before joining Adelaide United at age 17.

== Club career ==
Niyongabire was initially given a scholarship to the Adelaide United Football Schools, after being discovered by the club. He began playing for the Adelaide United NPL team in the second-tier NPL South Australia. On 14 January 2018, he was called up to the Adelaide United first team in the A-League Men, making his professional debut against Sydney. In March 2018, he signed a two-and-a-half year scholarship contract with the first team. On 30 July 2020, he scored his first A-League goal against Perth Glory. In June 2021, he departed the club, upon the expiry of his contract.

In August 2021, he signed with Perth Glory in the A-League Men, following a successful pre-season trial. In December 2022, he terminated his contract by mutual consent with the club to pursue another playing opportunity.

In December 2022, he signed with Canadian Premier League club Valour FC for the 2023 season. Niyongabire made his debut for Valour FC on 16 April 2023 against York United, recording an assist in the match. He scored his first goal for the club on 20 May 2023 against Pacific FC.

In January 2024, he joined USL Championship club Tampa Bay Rowdies for an undisclosed fee.

On March 10, 2026, Loudoun United of the USL Championship announced they had signed Niyongabire through the 2026 season.

== International career ==
On 16 November 2022, he made his debut for the Burundi national football team in a friendly against Ivory Coast.

On 19 November, he scored in a 1–0 victory in an unofficial friendly against Guinea U23.

On 25 March 2023, he scored his first goal for the national team in a friendly match against Indonesia in a 3–1 loss (his previous goal was considered unofficial, as the match was not against a senior national team).

In June 2023, he was called up for his first official tournament match ahead of a 2023 Africa Cup of Nations qualification match.

== Personal life ==
He is the younger brother of Elvis Kamsoba, who is also a professional footballer who also plays on the Burundi national football team.

== Career statistics ==
=== Club ===
As of 7 October 2023

Club	Season	League			Playoffs		Domestic Cup		Continental		Total	
Club	Season	Division	Apps	Goals	Apps	Goals	Apps	Goals	Apps	Goals	Apps	Goals
Adelaide United NPL	2017	NPL South Australia	19	5	—		—		—		19	5
Adelaide United NPL	2018	NPL South Australia	14	10	1	0	—		—		15	10
Adelaide United NPL	2019	NPL South Australia	13	7	—		—		—		13	7
Adelaide United NPL	2020	NPL South Australia	6	2	—		—		—		6	2
Adelaide United NPL	2021	NPL South Australia	4	1	—		—		—		4	1
Adelaide United NPL	Total		56	25	1	0	0	0	0	0	57	25
Adelaide United	2017–18	A-League	1	0	0	0	0	0	—		1	0
Adelaide United	2018–19	A-League	0	0	0	0	0	0	—		0	0
Adelaide United	2019–20	A-League	3	1	—		2	0	—		5	1
Adelaide United	2020–21	A-League	16	0	2	0	—		—		18	0
Adelaide United	Total		20	1	2	0	2	0	0	0	24	1
Perth Glory	2021–22	A-League	17	0	—		1	0	—		18	0
Perth Glory	2022–23	A-League	0	0	—		0	0	—		0	0
Perth Glory	Total		17	0	1	0	0	0	0	0	18	0
Valour FC	2023	Canadian Premier League	25	1	—		1	0	—		26	1
Career total			118	27	3	0	4	0	0	0	125	27

=== International ===
As of 12 September 2023

Burundi
Year	Apps	Goals
2022	1	0
2023	4	1
Total	5	1

==== International goals ====
Goal	Date	Venue	Opponent	Score	Result	Competition
1.	25 March 2023	Patriot Chandrabhaga Stadium, Bekasi, Indonesia	Indonesia	3–1	3–1	Friendly
