= Josh Cavallo =

Australian association footballer

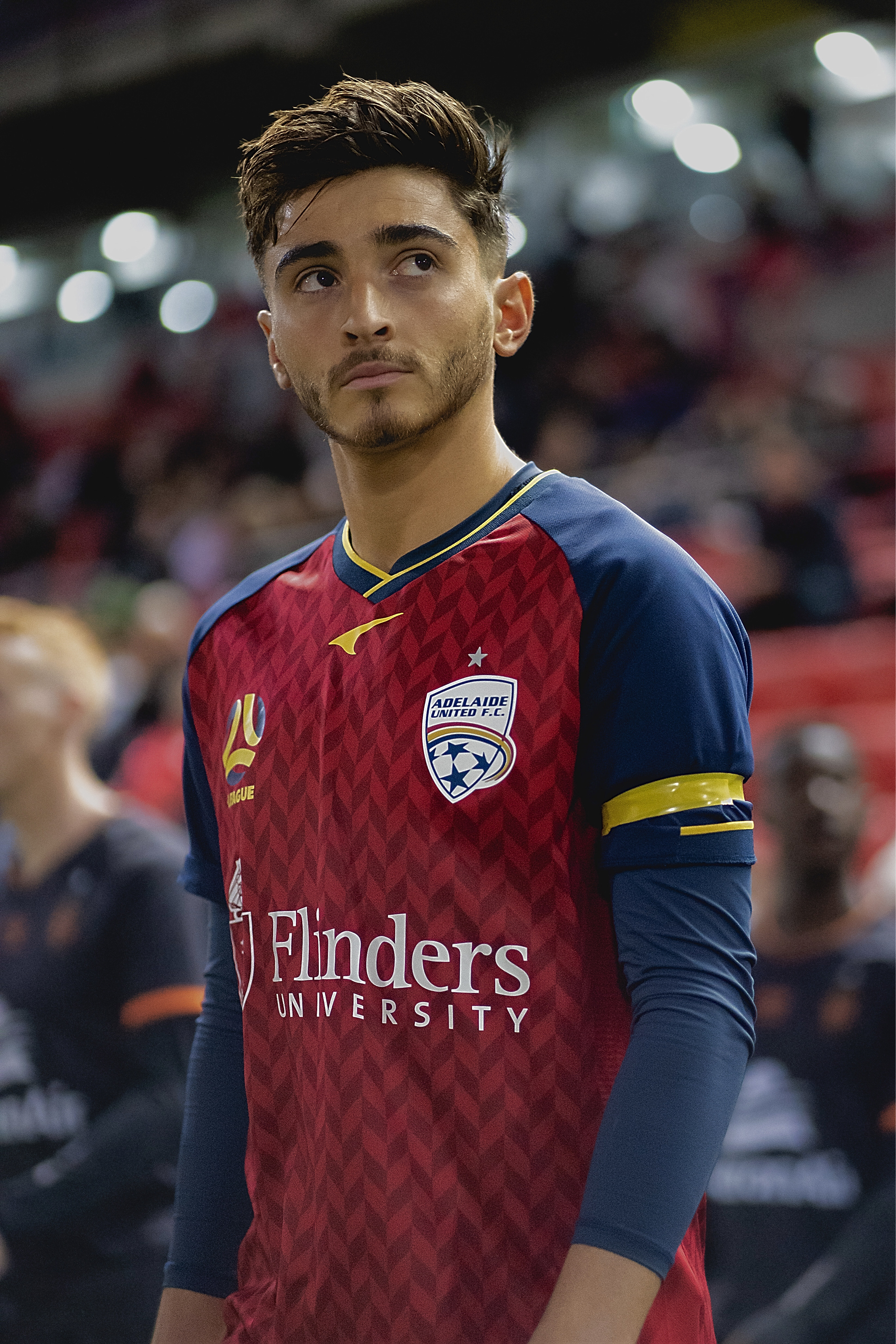
- Cavallo with Adelaide United in 2021

Personal information
- Full name: Joshua John Cavallo
- Date of birth: 13 November 1999 (age 26)
- Place of birth: Bentleigh East, Victoria, Australia
- Height: 1.76 m (5 ft 9 in)
- Positions: Left back; central midfielder

Team information
- Current team: Stamford

Youth career
- 2015–2016: Melbourne Victory
- 2017–2019: Melbourne City

Senior career*
Years	Team	Apps	(Gls)
2017–2019	Melbourne City NPL	72	(7)
2019–2021	Western United	9	(0)
2021–2025	Adelaide United	49	(0)
2025	Peterborough Sports	4	(0)
2025–	Stamford	0	(0)

International career^{‡}
2018	Australia U20	1	(0)
- * Club domestic league appearances and goals as of 09:11, 8 October 2025 (UTC) ‡ National team caps and goals as of 23 March 2020

Joshua John Cavallo (born 13 November 1999) is an Australian professional soccer player who plays for Southern League Premier Division Central club Stamford. Cavallo has represented the Australian under-20 national team. He came out as gay in 2021, becoming the first active male top-flight professional soccer player to do so.

== Early life ==
Joshua John Cavallo was born on 13 November 1999 in Bentleigh East, Victoria. He is of Italian and Maltese descent.

He says that he was initially more into playing tennis, but his brother encouraged him to kick a ball around in the backyard and it was not long before he "fell in love" with the game.

== Club career ==
=== Youth ===
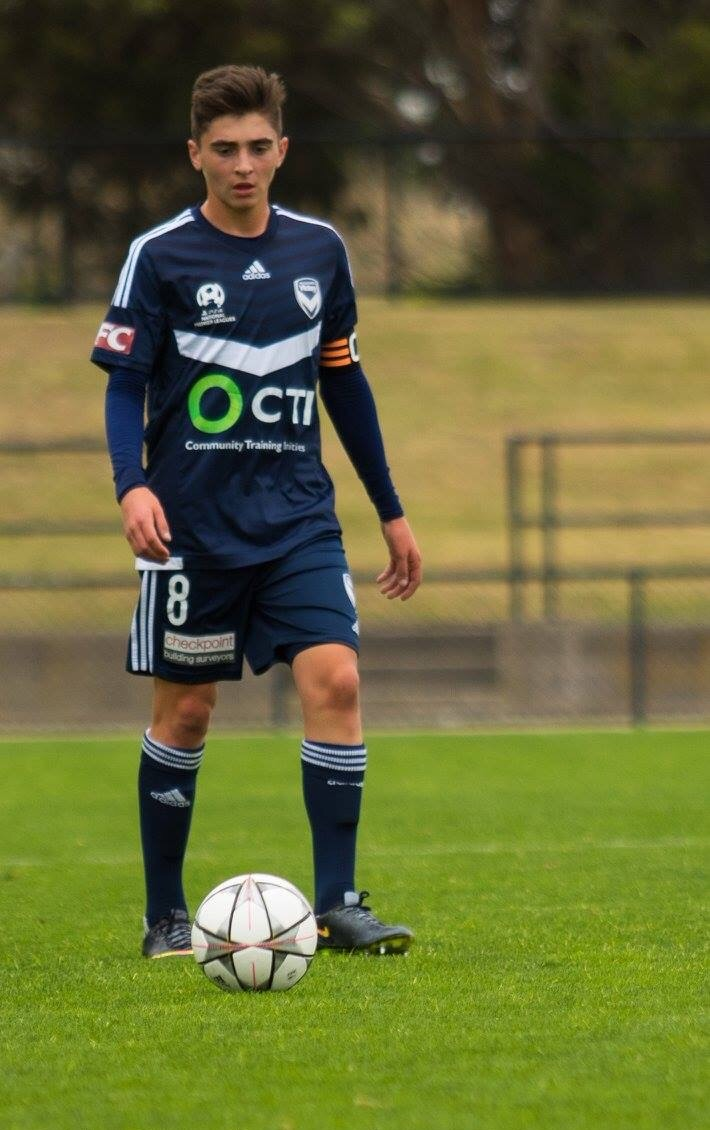
Cavallo with Melbourne Victory Youth in 2016

Cavallo was scouted by a national program at the age of 15, and later offered a scholarship by Melbourne Victory. He represented both Melbourne Victory FC Youth and Melbourne City FC Youth.

=== Western United ===
On 15 April 2019, Melbourne City announced that Cavallo would leave the club at the expiration of his contract at the end of the 2018–19 season.

On 24 June 2019, new A-League side Western United, representing western Melbourne suburbs and western Victorian regional towns, announced that Cavallo would join the club ahead of its inaugural season. He made his debut on 3 January 2020 in a 3–2 loss at his previous club. On as a 71st-minute substitute for Apostolos Stamatelopoulos, he earned a penalty when fouled by goalkeeper Dean Bouzanis, which was converted by Besart Berisha.

Western United announced that Cavallo was leaving the club on 10 February 2021 to seek more playing time with another A-League club.

=== Adelaide United ===
On 18 February 2021, Cavallo signed a short-term contract to play for Adelaide United. After a successful stint in the 2020–21 A-League, he signed a two-year contract extension on 11 May. He was rewarded with Adelaide United's A-League Rising Star award after a successful 2020–21 campaign, in which he started 15 games and made 18 appearances.

He plays as a left back and central midfielder for the club.

During the 2024–25 season, Cavallo failed to make a single appearance for Adelaide, only making the bench eight times throughout the season. He departed the club at the season's end. On 13 January 2026, Cavallo stated that his departure from Adelaide United was influenced by homophobia. In a statement published on Instagram, he alleged that teammates had mocked him and shared images of him and his partner.

=== Peterborough Sports ===
On 11 July 2025, Cavallo joined English National League North side Peterborough Sports.

== International career ==
Cavallo was in the Australian under-19 national team which played in the 2018 AFC U-19 Championship in October–November 2018, starting with a game against Korea Republic.

Cavallo has represented the Australian under-20 national team.

Cavallo hoped to make the team at the 2022 FIFA World Cup, but was not selected to play. He was disappointed at FIFA's decision to ban players from wearing "OneLove" armbands at the tournament

== Personal life ==
He came out as gay in October 2021. At the time, there were no other openly gay male footballers playing professional top-flight football. He said in a statement, "I hope that in sharing who I am, I can show others who identify as LGBTQ+ that they are welcome in the football community". Cavallo said he had "never smiled so much in my life" and had "the best night's sleep" after his announcement. He was fully and explicitly supported by Adelaide United management and fellow players. The announcement was widely reported in the international press, and Cavallo received messages of support from many football players, including Gerard Piqué, Marcus Rashford, Antoine Griezmann, Jordan Henderson, Gary Lineker, and Zlatan Ibrahimović, as well as fans, strangers, and celebrities such as Lil Nas X and Ellen DeGeneres.

Cavallo was the first high-profile player to come out during their career since English footballer Justin Fashanu made a similar announcement in 1990. Fashanu faced widespread homophobia after the announcement. (Note: Fashanu committed suicide eight years later, after fleeing to England following charges being laid in the U.S. that he sexually assaulted a 17-year-old boy, which he denied, saying that the sex had been consensual.) In May 2022 English footballer Jake Daniels came out, aged 17, becoming the UK's only male professional footballer to be publicly out at the time, and the first since Fashanu. He cited Cavallo among those who had helped him to come out.

In March 2024, Cavallo proposed to his partner Leighton Morrell on the pitch at Coopers Stadium, Adelaide United's home ground. He posted three photos on Instagram, one of which showed Morrell wearing an engagement ring, and thanked his club for their support and encouragement to live his life authentically.

== Recognition ==
He won Adelaide United's Rising Star award for the 2020–21 season.

In 2022, Cavallo received an honorary doctorate from Flinders University in Adelaide, in recognition of "his exceptional contributions as a role model in elite men's sport and as a champion for equality".

Cavallo was nominated as 2023 SA Young Australian of the Year.

== Career statistics ==
As of match played 18 March 2025

Appearances and goals by club, season and competition
Club	Season	League			Australia Cup		Total	
Club	Season	Division	Apps	Goals	Apps	Goals	Apps	Goals
Western United	2019–20	A-League	9	0	–		9	0
Western United	2020–21	A-League	0	0	–		0	0
Western United	Total		9	0	–		9	0
Adelaide United	2020–21	A-League	19	0	–		19	0
Adelaide United	2021–22	A-League Men	19	0	3	0	22	0
Adelaide United	2022–23	A-League Men	7	0	3	0	10	0
Adelaide United	2023–24	A-League Men	4	0	0	0	4	0
Adelaide United	2024–25	A-League Men	0	0	0	0	0	0
Total			49	0	6	0	55	0
Career total			58	0	6	0	64	0

== See also ==
- List of Adelaide United FC club award winners
