= Domenic Costanzo =

Australian footballer

Personal information
- Date of birth: 9 October 2001 (age 25)
- Place of birth: Sydney, Australia
- Positions: Midfielder; striker

Team information
- Current team: Adelaide City
- Number: 86

Youth career
- –2016: FFSA NTC
- 2017: WT Birkalla
- 2018–2019: Adelaide United

Senior career*
Years	Team	Apps	(Gls)
2018	Croydon Kings	13	(0)
2019	Adelaide United Youth	13	(2)
2020	Croydon Kings	18	(14)
2020–2021	Adelaide United	0	(0)
2021	Croydon Kings	15	(5)
2022–2025	Marconi	23	(6)
2025–2026	Apia Liechardt		
2026–	Adelaide City		
- * Club domestic league appearances and goals as of 29 September 2022 ‡ National team caps and goals as of 7 October 2022

Domenic Costanzo (born 9 October 2001) is an Australian football player who plays as a midfielder/striker for National Premier Leagues South Australia club Adelaide City.

== Early life ==
Costanzo was born in Sydney, to Angelo Costanzo, who played in Marconi at the time. He didn't play football until his father moved to Newcastle Jets where he would find his passion of football while watching his father train.

== Club career ==
=== Youth career ===
Costanzo started playing in the youth leagues in NPL South Australia. He eventually joined Adelaide United, where he would play in the reserve league until being released and joining Croydon Kings under his father who was Head Coach at the time.

=== Senior career ===
In 2018, Costanzo played for Croydon's senior squad where he made his senior league debut against Para Hills Knights. He left to rejoin Adelaide United for a year until being released and rejoining Croydon in 2020. He became the league's second top goalscorer only losing to Adelaide Comets captain and former A-League Men player Allan Welsh. His impressive form would earn him interest from A-League clubs and, ultimately, sign a scholarship deal with Adelaide United at the conclusion of the season.

==== Marconi Stallions ====
After being released, Costanzo went on trial with Newcastle Jets and soon after, rejoined Croydon for a third time before moving to NSW. On 23 February 2022, Costanzo was announced to have signed with Marconi Stallions following in the footsteps of his father who joined the Stallions in the early 2000s.

==== Adelaide City ====
In January 2026, he join Adelaide City.
