= 2023–24 Adelaide United FC season =

19th season in existence of Adelaide United FC

Adelaide United
2023–24 season
- Chairman: Ned Morris
- Manager: Carl Veart
- Stadium: Coopers Stadium
- A-League Men: 8th
- A-League Men Finals: Did not qualify
- Australia Cup: Round of 16
- Top goalscorer: League: Hiroshi Ibusuki (15); All: Hiroshi Ibusuki (15)
- Highest home attendance: 12,859 vs. Sydney FC (11 November 2023); A-League Men
- Lowest home attendance: 7,233 vs. Brisbane Roar (10 December 2023); A-League Men
- Average home league attendance: 10,035
- Biggest win: 6–0 vs. Melbourne City (H) (29 October 2023); A-League Men
- Biggest defeat: 1–5 vs. Western Sydney Wanderers (A) (29 August 2023); Australia Cup vs. Sydney FC (A) (11 November 2023); A-League Men; 0–4 vs. Central Coast Mariners (H) (3 February 2024); A-League Men
Home colours	Away colours
- All statistics correct as of 1 May 2024.

The 2023–24 season was the 20th in the history of Adelaide United Football Club since its establishment in 2003. The club participated in the A-League Men for the 19th time and the Australia Cup for the ninth time.

In their 20th year of existence, Adelaide United's season began with their second worst Australia Cup performance, losing 1–5 to Western Sydney Wanderers in the round of 16. Leading into the season, Adelaide lost numerous high-profile players, including their captain and all-time leading goalscorer, Craig Goodwin, Olyroos midfielder Louis D'Arrigo, and ex-La Liga midfielder Juande. Their A-League Men campaign began on 20 October with a 3–0 win over reigning champions, Central Coast Mariners and a 6–0 win against reigning premiers Melbourne City a week later. Following a draw with rivals Melbourne Victory, the Reds sat atop of the ladder for the first time since they won the premiers' plate in 2016.

Adelaide confirmed the sale of 17-year-old Nestory Irankunda to Bayern Munich in November 2023, breaking the record for the largest domestic transfer fee paid to an Australian club, with the fee reported to be around $5.7 million plus add-ons. Irankunda would spend the remainder of the season with United, where he would be nominated for the Australian Young Footballer of the Year award and become the first Australian player to be named in Goal.com's NXGN. Adelaide also completed the deadline-day sale of Socceroos goalkeeper Joe Gauci to Aston Villa for a reported $2.4 million plus add-ons, becoming the second most expensive player in the club's history, only behind Irankunda.

A poor run of form from November through to March saw Adelaide win just three out of 18 matches. The loss of key players Bernardo, Gauci, Hall and Popovic, as well as constant squad rotation due to player unavailability to injury, was the catalyst for a seven-match winless run, which saw them slump to 11th on the ladder after round 20. United ended their drought with consecutive wins against the Newcastle Jets, Western United and Perth Glory, helping them maintain a slim chance of finals, before a loss to Macarthur and a draw against Western United knocked Adelaide out of finals for the first time since 2020.

== Season summary ==
=== Pre-season ===
10 days after their 2022–23 season ended with a 4–1 semi-final aggregate defeat to Central Coast Mariners, Spanish midfielder Juande announced his departure from the club, following a two-year stint. After spending the second half of the season on the sidelines after suffering a broken leg in a 3–3 draw with Melbourne City, Juande announced his departure on Instagram, saying "... sometimes football is so unfair and selfish, but Adelaide United is much more than two people to tarnish my memories." A week and a half later, the departures of George Blackwood and Asad Kasumovic were also announced. Blackwood made 41 appearances and scored 9 goals in all competitions during his second stint at the club, while making 113 appearances and scoring 25 goals over both stints. Asad Kasumovic made 10 appearances in all competitions.

On 28 June 2023, the draw for the 2023 Australia Cup Round of 32 took place. Adelaide United drew National Premier Leagues Victoria 2 side Northcote City, with the match being scheduled for 14 August a week later.

On 10 July, Javi López became the first player of the new season to extend his contract. Over the next two days, extensions were announced for Josh Cavallo and Ethan Alagich, both for two years. The pre-season calendar was released the following day, with training sessions at West Torrens Birkalla, FK Beograd, The Cove and Croydon FC, and matches at Cove, Beograd and Campbelltown City. The matches were organised during Football South Australia's competition hiatus during the Women's World Cup.

On 18 July, Adelaide United NPL player Nathan Amanatidis signed for Sydney FC, following the 2023 AFC U-17 Asian Cup, where he scored two goals for Australia, against China and Tajikistan.

Following a contract extension for Luke Duzel and a scholarship contract for Ethan Cox, their first friendly game against The Cove resulted in an 8–1 win, with a squad formed of young players. The following day, a three-year contract was announced for Luka Jovanovic. Their second friendly was against FK Beograd, where a team, once again composed of mostly young players, lost 4–2, with former injury replacement player Joshua Mori scoring a penalty. Adelaide United were scheduled to play a friendly match against Campbelltown City, however it was cancelled without notice, and the announcement of the game was removed from their website.

The week before their first game of the season, Adelaide United announced a new three-year contract for Jonny Yull.

=== Australia Cup ===
Adelaide United's first competitive match was against Victorian semi-professional club Northcote City in Melbourne, which saw the debuts of Giuseppe Bovalina and Fabian Talladira. Five minutes into the game, captain Craig Goodwin opened his account for the season with a low drive that was spilled in by the goalkeeper, assisted by Jonny Yull. Despite dominating the game, they were unable to increase their lead, until Zach Clough scored with a volley in the 85th minute to confirm their advance to the round of 16. The same night as their 2–0 win in the Round of 32, the draw for the next round of the Cup took place. They were drawn against A-League Men opposition Western Sydney Wanderers, with the match being confirmed to be played at Marconi Stadium on the night of 29 August.

Carl Veart went with an unchanged starting lineup for the round of 16 match, with Nestory Irankunda being dropped from the squad after an incident in an NPL SA semi-final the previous Friday. Adelaide United would drop out of the cup, going down 1–5 to Western Sydney Wanderers, with Zach Clough scoring a consolation goal in the 81st minute.

On 6 September 2023, midfielder Louis D'Arrigo left the club to sign for Polish second division club Lechia Gdańsk. D'Arrigo made 98 league appearances for the club since 2018, and was a product of the youth academy. Later that day, scholarships were announced for Bailey O'Neil, Panagiotis Kikianis, and Giuseppe Bovalina, all of which play as defenders.

On 8 September, it was reported that Adelaide's captain Craig Goodwin had signed for a Saudi Arabian club on a $800,000 transfer fee. It was also indicated that he had requested a three-year extension on his current two-year deal, but was rejected by the club. Later that day, his departure to join Al Wehda was confirmed by the club for an undisclosed fee. That same day, Adelaide United's youth team won the NPL SA Grand Final, defeating Modbury Jets 7–2. The team included many young first team players, including Panashe Madanha, Luka Jovanovic, Jonny Yull, Luke Duzel and Ethan Alagich, in a side with an average age of 17.2 years.

On 19 September, Adelaide United announced their only new signing ahead of the new season, English midfielder Ryan Tunnicliffe on a two-year deal. Tunnicliffe most recently played for League One side Portsmouth, playing a total of 350 games in English professional football, and was a product of Manchester United's academy. Two days later, United released their home kit for the season, with the design inspired by the original kit from their inaugural 2003–04 season, the design being a red shirt with navy blue hoops on the sleeves.

On 27 September, United played their first pre-season friendly against A-League opposition, defeating Melbourne Victory 1–0 in a behind closed doors friendly at AAMI Park. Ryan Kitto scored the only goal of the tightly contested match, a left-footed strike from outside the box into the top-right corner. Two days later, Kitto was named club captain, replacing Craig Goodwin, who departed the club earlier in the month. Isaías, Joe Gauci and Ben Halloran were named vice-captains.

On 5 October, just over a week out from the start of the A-League Men season, 19-year-old Panashe Madanha signed a new 3-year contract, replacing his previous contract, which still had a year left to run. The next day, Adelaide United defeated Western Sydney Wanderers 1–0 in their second pre-season friendly against A-League Men opposition. Lachlan Barr scored the winning goal, a closed ranged header in the 90th minute, in another match that was held without a crowd. Adelaide United rounded off their pre-season with a goalless draw at home against Westen United the next week.

=== A-League Men ===
The fixtures for the 2023–24 A-League Men season were released on 24 August 2023. Their first match being at home on a Friday night against Central Coast Mariners, a team that they failed to defeat last season, with an aggregate score of 2–12. Adelaide will play rivals Melbourne Victory on three occasions, twice away, on 4 November and 30 December 2023 and once home, on 9 March 2024. Controversially, Adelaide Venue Management (AVM), who own and operate Coopers Stadium, announced the same day that Melbourne Victory fans would not be allowed into the venue for the round 20 game, due to the incident in last years Melbourne Derby, and previous incidents between Adelaide and Victory supporters. A few hours later, they deleted their announcement, stating that the decision had been reversed. The CEO of AVM, Anthony Kirchner, was stood down three days later, and sacked in late September.

On 18 October 2023, two days before Adelaide United's season opener, the Australian Professional Leagues announced a Magic Round style Unite Round, with all the matches being held in Sydney from 12–14 January 2024. This meant that the season was expanded to 27 games. This was introduced as part of the APL's scrapping of the controversial grand final decision last season.

==== October ====
Carl Veart named a 20-man-squad for the opening match against reigning champions, Central Coast Mariners. Bernardo, Hiroshi Ibusuki, and Nestory Irankunda all returned from off-season injuries. Harry Van der Saag remained on the sideline with a knee injury from early last season, Jay Barnett, Josh Cavallo, and Panagiotis Kikianis were also out injured, with hamstring, achilles, and ankle injuries respectively. Luka Jovanovic, Steven Hall, and Bailey O'Neil were all on international duty with the Australian U18 squad.

Nestory Irankunda made his first start for the club after 35 substitute appearances. The Mariners were forced into two substitutions in the first half, with Brian Kaltak and Alou Kuol going down injured after 22 and 32 minutes respectively. Six minutes later, Ben Halloran scored the opening goal of the new A-League Men season, a first time shot following a lay-off from Hiroshi Ibusuki, landing just over the line off the crossbar. The goal came after two near-misses from Adelaide, Zach Clough having his shot saved from point-blank, and later hitting the base of the far post. Clough would eventually score, converting a penalty won by captain Ryan Kitto midway through the second half. Mariners defender Jacob Farrell received two yellow cards in quick succession to put their team down to ten-men. Adelaide would score from this set-piece, Nick Ansell scoring a header from Bernardo's cross to make it 3–0.

Adelaide United's second match of the season was against reigning premiers Melbourne City, held a day later than originally scheduled due to City's involvement in the AFC Champions League. The club partnered with the Breakthrough Mental Health Research Foundation to host Mental Health Game. Luka Jovanovic returned from international duty, and Ethan Alagich returned to the squad after not featuring in the opening game. Javi López was unavailable with a quad injury. Van der Saag, Barnett, Cavallo and Kikianis remained on the sideline, with the latter expected to return for the match against Melbourne Victory.

Veart fielded the same starting eleven as a week earlier, the only change to the matchday squad being Ethan Alagich replacing Luke Duzel's spot on the bench. United led 2–0 within half an hour, with Nestory Irankunda scoring a long-ranged free kick, and Callum Talbot heading the ball into his own net after a missed header from Hiroshi Ibusuki. Early in the second half, City were awarded a penalty after Panashe Madanha handled the ball following a cross. Jamie Maclaren went down the middle, however Joe Gauci saved the shot with his foot. Adelaide went on to dominate the last 15 minutes of the match; new signing Ryan Tunnicliffe scored in his second appearance off the bench, 17-year-old Musa Toure scored his first goal for the club just 6 minutes later, and Bernardo scored a brace in the 88th and 94th minutes, as Adelaide ran away 6–0 winners.

==== November ====
Adelaide United brought 19 players across the border for their first away game of the season, against rivals Melbourne Victory. Lachlan Barr, Luka Jovanovic and Luke Duzel came into the squad, with Ben Warland staying home for personal reasons. Alexandar Popovic was cleared of any injury after coming off in the first half of the previous match after tweaking his knee.

No changes were made to the starting lineup for the third match in a row. Victory dominated the first half, Bruno Fornaroli opened the scoring on the 28 minute mark, however despite various other attempts, the home team failed to find another goal, with Joe Gauci making three saves throughout the first 45 minutes. Just shy of the hour mark, Nestory Irankunda was fouled by Roderick Miranda, who received a yellow card. From the free kick, Zach Clough played the ball into the box and Hiroshi Ibusuki tapped it into the net to equalise with his first goal of the season. A second yellow for Miranda a few minutes later meant that Melbourne Victory were reduced to ten men with half an hour to play. Both teams had opportunities in an end-to-end half, with United being denied by former goalkeeper Paul Izzo in the dying minutes.

In the fifth minute of stoppage time, Irankunda received the ball on the right wing. Chris Ikonomidis pulled his shirt and bumped him to the ground, however the foul was not given, causing Irankunda to lash out. Alex King sent Irankunda off with a second yellow card, and Connor Chapman was booked after walking up to him after the sending off, causing Irankunda to lash out at him as well. Former Adelaide United player Bruce Djite called the sending off an "absolute joke", stating that the referees "need to get their act together" and should be "protecting the hottest, brightest prospects in Australian football." Former Victory forward Archie Thompson agreed with Djite's comments, adding that "the linesman should've been helping (Alex) King, because the players were right in front of him." Carl Veart said that "Nestor has to be better" and that "he has to learn to be able to control them (his frustrations) a little bit better." Veart stated that he asked Alex King why he didn't give the foul, and that the referee said that "he told him, he has to be stronger."

The Australian national team squad was announced on 9 November, with goalkeeper Joe Gauci the only current Adelaide player to be called up for the World Cup qualifying matches against Bangladesh and Palestine. Nestory Irankunda was a notable exclusion from the squad, with head coach Graham Arnold saying that he had not been consistent enough.

The next day, football reporter Fabrizio Romano stated that Bayern Munich were "closing in on (a) deal" to sign Nestory Irankunda, stating that the deal was worth over AUD$5.5 million, plus add-ons. The move would go through at the end of the season, as Irankunda turns 18 in February 2024. The rumours of the move were first mentioned by commentator Andy Harper in April.

The last match before the November international break was against Sydney FC, with newly appointed manager Ufuk Talay set to manage his first game for the Sky Blues. Ben Warland returned to the squad after missing the Victory match, due to the birth of his son. Ethan Alagich and Luka Jovanovic were also included in the squad, not yet having made an appearance this season. Nestory Irankunda was unavailable due to his suspension received in the previous week's Original Rivalry. The match was held on Remembrance Day, with an Adelaide United Legends team playing against a select squad from the Australian Defence Force before the match.

Three changes were made to the starting lineup, Giuseppe Bovalina and Ryan Tunnicliffe came into the starting eleven, replacing Panashe Madanha and Isaías respectively, the latter being rested following a groin strain. Bernardo was the final change, replacing the suspended Nestory Irankunda. Joe Lolley and Jaiden Kucharski scored first-half braces, and Fábio Gomes scored from kick-off in the second half for Sydney FC. Zach Clough scored a penalty that he won in the 67th minute, however Adelaide slumped to their first loss of the season, thrashed 1–5 by Sydney, who were bottom of the ladder at the start of the round. Carl Veart said that the team was "very naive in the way they played" in his post-match interview. He also stated that it is possible that having so many young players in the squad could possibly lead to erratic form.

On Tuesday 14 November 2023, at 19:57 ACDT, Adelaide United confirmed that they had agreed terms with Bayern Munich for the sale of 17-year-old winger, Nestory Irankunda. Due to FIFA laws regarding international transfers of under-18 players, he will remain with the club for the rest of the season, joining Bayern on 1 July 2024 on a long-term contract. The fee was officially undisclosed, however it was reported to be in the region of AUD$5.7 million plus add-ons. The fee is the largest received by an Australian club, superseding the previous record set by Marco Tilio when he moved to Celtic earlier in the year. The news was broken the same night that Irankunda was nominated for Australia's Young Footballer of the Year award.

On 20 November, 22-year-old midfielder Austin Ayoubi signed with Adelaide United for the remainder of the season, following a month-long trial. Ayoubi played for NPL South Australia club North Eastern MetroStars during the 2023 season, winning the NPL SA premiership and Federation Cup, and reaching the quarter-finals of the Australia Cup. He registered with the club at the beginning of the January transfer window.

Following the international break, Adelaide headed back over the border to Victoria, for round 5 of the A-League Men season. The first of two away games was against Western United in Ballarat. Nestory Irankunda returned to the squad, his first game since his move to Bayern Munich was confirmed. Winger Panashe Madanha was ruled out for at least 10 weeks, following surgery on an ankle injury.

Carl Veart stated that he was "not going to make (too many) changes," despite the massive loss to Sydney FC a fortnight ago. Ryan Tunnicliffe, Hiroshi Ibusuki and Bernardo came out of the starting eleven. Isaías returned from a groin strain, Luka Jovanovic made his first start of the season, and Nestory Irankunda returned to the starting eleven, following suspension. In the final match of the weekend, Ben Halloran opened the scoring half an hour in, receiving a cross from Irankunda, he cut inwards and placed the ball into the bottom-left corner from outside the box. Lachlan Wales brought Western United level, but just three minutes later, Alexandar Popovic headed home a Zach Clough cross, and Luka Jovanovic scored a first-time shot from close range in the 63rd minute, Halloran getting the assist. Despite being forced into some desperate defending in the last half-hour, United held on to get their first win since trouncing Melbourne City 6–0 at home a month ago. The result put Adelaide into 3rd position, one point off the top of the table.

==== December ====
The first away day outside of Victoria was to Campbelltown in Sydney's south-west to face Macarthur FC. The match was held a day later than originally scheduled, postponed to 4 December following the news that Macarthur would play Shan United in the AFC Cup in Thailand, as opposed to in Australia, as the Shan players had their Visa applications rejected. Veart kept the same lineup from the win against Western United a week earlier. Macarthur opened the scoring through Valère Germain in the eighth minute, following Clayton Lewis' cross. Zach Clough equalised nine minutes later following Nestory Irankunda's cut-back. Matthew Millar put The Bulls back ahead in 24th minute and Giuseppe Bovalina levelled the score again in the second minute of first-half stoppage time, heading home Ryan Kitto's cross. Clough grabbed a brace early in the second half, a lead that Adelaide would maintain for 21 minutes, until Jake Hollman and Ulises Dávila scored in the 82nd and 84th minutes, leaving Adelaide 3–4 losers, despite a fight-back in stoppage time. Veart stated that the loss was down the team playing "too passive", and that "there was a lack of focus and too much inconsistency." Two days after the game, a two-year contract extension was announced for English midfielder Zach Clough.

On 6 December, Scottish club Hibernian, currently headed by ex-Mariners coach Nick Montgomery, were reported to be interested in signing 18-year-old Musa Toure, despite not yet having started a professional match. Toure is out of contract at the end of the season, though Montgomery mentioned at the possibility of him joining the club during the January transfer window. Carl Veart denied that Toure's contract is up at the end of season, also saying that he has "a lot of developing to go before he goes overseas."

Adelaide returned home to play Brisbane Roar on a cold and wet Sunday afternoon. Veart made three changes to the side, centre-backs Ben Warland and Lachlan Barr replaced Alexandar Popovic and Nick Ansell, and Luke Duzel replacing Jonny Yull in midfield. United would succumb to their second consecutive defeat, despite having better chances in the first half, Brisbane dominated the second half, scoring through Jez Lofthouse and a Jay O'Shea penalty, winning 2–0, with goalkeeper Joe Gauci preventing an even larger scoreline. Following his substitution in the 58th minute, Nestory Irankunda was pictured crying in the dugout. Veart said that Irankunda was "disappointed with his performance" and that "he's still a young player that has a long way to go and a lot to learn." Former player Roy O'Donovan suggested that "he needs maybe some time away from the pitch." Bayern Munich's sporting director Christoph Freund said that he was "not worried" about Irankunda's reaction, saying that "it's better when the boys are involved with heart and passion." Musa Toure was ruled out for a month following a quad injury sustained during the match.

Adelaide would again travel to Sydney, playing against Western Sydney Wanderers on 15 December. Four changes were made to the starting line-up, the back two reverting to the Barr–Popovic combination from two weeks earlier, Ethan Alagich and Ryan Tunnicliffe came in for Zach Clough and Isaías. Adelaide would again suffer defeat, falling 0–1 to the ten-man Wanderers, the solitary goal scored from a Dylan Pierias chip. The result meant that Adelaide dropped out of the top six, having been top of the ladder six weeks earlier. The result marked the first time United had lost three consecutive games since 2020.

On 22 December, Graham Arnold announced the squad for Australia's Asian Cup campaign, beginning in January. Joe Gauci was one of four current A-League Men players, and the only Adelaide player to be chosen for the squad.

Adelaide played Newcastle Jets in their final home game of the year on 22 December. Given recent form, Veart experimented with tactics, changing from a 4–2–3–1 to a 4–2–2–2 formation. Hiroshi Ibusuki returned to the starting 11, lining up alongside Luka Jovanovic up front. Jonny Yull came into midfield, with Luke Duzel and Ethan Alagich dropped to the bench. Adelaide started positively, opening the scoring through Hiroshi Ibusuki following a lengthy VAR check. Zach Clough scored his fifth of the season, converting a penalty won by Jovanovic, sneaking the ball under Jets' keeper Scott. Two minutes after the second, Adelaide linked up to score a third, Irankunda and Clough setting up Ben Halloran to score from close range. Justin Vidic scored in the final minute of regulation time for Newcastle, however Adelaide would see out the match, their first win in almost a month, and their first at home in almost two.

Adelaide's final match of the year was against rivals Melbourne Victory, the second time the clubs had met so far this season, both clashes being at Victory's AAMI Park. Josh Cavallo completed his recovery from a ruptured Achilles tendon sustained in February, though he did not feature in the matchday squad. a single change was made to the starting lineup, Javi López replacing Giuseppe Bovalina at right-back, for what would be his first start of the season. Both sides were even in the first half, though Melbourne had the better share of promising chances; Roderick Miranda heading the ball onto the post in the 17th minute, and Joe Gauci making a full-stretch save to deny Daniel Arzani in the 37th minute. Bruno Fornaroli's goal in the 39th minute was disallowed after he was deemed offside. A change in formation put United on the back foot during the second half, Zinédine Machach scored the opener with 17 minutes remaining, and Bruno Fornaroli scored the second in stoppage time. The result meant that Adelaide had lost four of their last five matches, and also saw them slip out of the top six for the first time this season.

==== January ====
On 2 January 2024, Airton Andrioli, the club's head of youth development and assistant coach, extended his contract with the club for a further three seasons. Andrioli has been credited for recruiting and developing numerous players over his first three years at the club, including Luka Jovanovic, Nestory Irankunda and Ethan Alagich, as well as leading Adelaide United's NPL side to their maiden National Premier Leagues South Australia title in last year's Grand Final.

Adelaide United's first mach of the new year was against Wellington Phoenix, who sat top of the ladder. With Joe Gauci's unavailability due to international duty, James Delianov would start his first match since 31 December 2022, when he suffered a shoulder injury against the Phoenix. Steven Hall was brought into the squad as the backup goalkeeper, Josh Cavallo returned to the matchday squad from injury and Fabian Talladira was named in the squad for the first time this season.

In addition to Delianov's promotion, two changes were made, Giuseppe Bovalina and Nestory Irankunda returned to the starting eleven, replacing Javi López and Jonny Yull. Bozhidar Kraev scored for the Nix in the 12th minute, but had his goal ruled out for offside, though Kosta Barbarouses scored three minutes later to open the scoring. The lead would stand for just over 10 minutes, as Hiroshi Ibusuki would head home a Zach Clough corner to equalise. Referee Jonathan Barreiro was booed off the field at half time, having adjudged Adelaide to have committed 11 fouls to Wellington's two, which the home fans felt was lopsided. Within two minutes of the second half, Barbarouses put Wellington ahead again following a poor clearance from Bovalina. The lead would once again stand for just over 10 minutes, Hiroshi Ibusuki scoring his second of the night, owed largely to Irankunda's run down the right wing. Halloran and Ibusuki would both hit the woodwork in the remaining minutes and James Delianov would deny Barbarouses a hat-trick later in the match. In the 83rd minute, Ben Warland would be sent off for his challenge on Oskar van Hattum, which the referee judged to be a denial of a clear goalscoring opportunity. Bovalina's deflected shot in the 87th minute, Nicholas Pennington hitting the woodwork and Sam Sutton's miss late in the game meant that the match would end 2–2.

Adelaide would play again four days later, at home against Macarthur. The match was originally scheduled for 14 January, but was brought forward six days due to the scheduling of Unite Round. Jonny Yull returned to the squad following concussion protocols and Panagiotis Kikianis was named in the extended squad for the first time. Ben Warland was unavailable due to being sent off in the previous match and Bernardo was also excluded from the squad. The sole introduction to Adelaide's lineup, Ben Halloran, scored from a Bovalina cross to open the scoring in the 16th minute. Just past the half-hour mark, Valère Germain equalised for Macarthur. Ulises Dávila hit the crossbar and Ibusuki missed from six yards out before the end of the first half. Adelaide had a penalty call waved away when Ryan Kitto's shot hit the arm of Matthew Jurman. Macarthur would squander numerous chances later in the half; Raphael Borges Rodrigues missed an open net in the 71st minute and Jurman was denied in stoppage time by James Delianov. A second consecutive draw saw Adelaide remain in eighth spot on the ladder. Josh Cavallo was a late substitution in the match, making his first appearance since February when he ruptured his Achilles tendon.

United had another short turn-around, with the A-Leagues' first Unite Round held on the weekend of 12–14 January. The weekend saw all men's and women's matches held in Sydney, with Allianz Stadium and CommBank Stadium hosting A-League Men fixtures. Ben Warland returned from suspension and Austin Ayoubi was named in the squad, becoming available for the first time since signing for the club in November 2023. Adelaide United "hosted" Sydney FC on neutral ground at Allianz Stadium. Sydney dominated the early exchanges, forcing two saves out of James Delianov within the first minute and would eventually break after seven minutes, Anthony Caceres getting on the end of Rhyan Grant's through ball to tap it past Delianov. Sydney looked to double the lead after 12 minutes, but Fábio Gomes launched the ball over the bar from inside the box. Adelaide equalised in the 24th minute, Ben Halloran squaring a ball first time to Hiroshi Ibusuki, who tapped the ball into an empty net. Ibusuki would put Adelaide ahead 10 minutes later, converting Halloran's set-up, beating two defenders and scoring past Andrew Redmayne with his weaker left foot. In the fifth minute of stoppage time, Nestory Irankunda would double Adelaide's lead, the ball just making it across the line despite Rhyan Grant's best efforts. In the 73rd minute, Hiroshi Ibusuki would complete a perfect hat-trick with his last touch before being substituted, scoring a header from Zach Clough's cross. Joe Lolley would claw two goals back for Sydney in the 76th and 95th minutes, but Adelaide would hold on to win 4–3.

On 16 January, after missing the previous two matches, 19-year-old Bernardo departed the club via mutual contract termination, previously contracted until 2025. Less than an hour later, Bernardo was announced to have joined Macarthur.

Adelaide's next game was away to Melbourne City on 24 January. Ethan Cox came into the side, while Steven Hall and Alexandar Popovic were excluded as the club was negotiating overseas transfers. Ben Warland came into the side to cover Popovic's unavailability and Ryan Kitto returned to the starting lineup, replacing Javi López at right-back. Terry Antonis scored the game's only goal, a first time shot from the edge of the D into the top-right corner. Goalkeeper Jamie Young kept City in the lead, denying Ibusuki an equaliser on the half-hour mark and Irankunda in a one-on-one in the 79th minute. Adelaide wouldn't get any more chances to equalise and the match would end 0–1 in City's favour, with Jamie Young seen consoling Irankunda after full-time.

Before the next match, transfers were announced for three young players; 19-year-old goalkeeper Steven Hall signed for English side Brighton & Hove Albion, joining up with their academy side, 21-year-old centre-back Alexandar Popovic signed for Korean side Gwangju, and 23-year-old Joe Gauci, at the time on international duty, was signed by Aston Villa, reportedly for around $2.5 million, although all details were officially undisclosed. On 2 February, Adelaide United announced the signing of former captain Stefan Mauk, having trained with the club over the new year since his return to the country after his stint in the J2 League.

==== February ====
Following a mass exodus in January, Adelaide's first match of the new month was against Central Coast Mariners. Panagiotis Kikianis was brought into the starting eleven, replacing Ben Warland at centre-back. The Mariners dominated the entire match, Christian Theoharous opened the scoring just after half an hour and Ángel Torres scored a brace on the cusp of half-time to put Central Coast 3–0 up at half-time. Jing Reec added the fourth in the final minute of regulation time from the penalty spot, rounding off Adelaide's joint largest defeat of the season.

On 8 February, Adelaide United announced the deadline day signing of Yaya Dukuly until 2026. Dukuly previously played for the club until the end of the 2021–22 season before moving to French club Stade de Reims, making 30 appearances for their reserves side.

== Coaching staff ==
Position	Name	Contract	Ref.
Head coach	(Australia) Carl Veart	2026	
Assistant coach	(Australia) Mark Milligan	2024	
Assistant coach	(Australia) Damian Mori	2024	
Assistant coach Head of youth football	(Brazil) Airton Andrioli	2026	
Head of football	(Australia) Marius Zanin		
Goalkeeping coach	(Australia) Eugene Galekovic	2025	
Strength and conditioning coach	(Australia) Django Gentilcore		

== Players ==
=== Squad ===
Note: Flags indicate national team as defined under FIFA eligibility rules; some limited exceptions apply. Players may hold more than one non-FIFA nationality.

No.	Pos.	Nation	Player
1	GK	AUS	James Delianov
2	DF	AUS	Harry Van der Saag
3	DF	AUS	Ben Warland
4	DF	AUS	Nick Ansell
6	MF	AUS	Stefan Mauk
7	DF	AUS	Ryan Kitto (captain)
8	MF	ESP	Isaías
9	FW	JPN	Hiroshi Ibusuki
10	FW	ENG	Zach Clough
13	DF	AUS	Lachlan Barr
14	MF	AUS	Jay Barnett
17	FW	AUS	Luka Jovanovic
19	FW	AUS	Yaya Dukuly
21	DF	ESP	Javi López

No.	Pos.	Nation	Player
22	MF	ENG	Ryan Tunnicliffe
23	MF	AUS	Luke Duzel
26	FW	AUS	Ben Halloran
27	DF	AUS	Josh Cavallo
36	DF	AUS	Panashe Madanha
37	MF	AUS	Jonny Yull
40	GK	AUS	Ethan Cox
42	MF	LBN	Austin Ayoubi
49	FW	AUS	Musa Toure (scholarship)
51	DF	AUS	Panagiotis Kikianis (scholarship)
54	DF	AUS	Bailey O'Neil (scholarship)
55	MF	AUS	Ethan Alagich
62	MF	AUS	Fabian Talladira (scholarship)
66	FW	AUS	Nestory Irankunda (scholarship)

=== Other players ===
Youth players who featured in a matchday squad, but are uncontracted to the senior team.

Note: Flags indicate national team as defined under FIFA eligibility rules; some limited exceptions apply. Players may hold more than one non-FIFA nationality.

No.	Pos.	Nation	Player
56	FW	AUS	Jake Porter

== Transfers ==
=== Transfers in ===
No.	Position	Player	From	Type/fee	Contract length	Date	Ref
22	MF	(England) Ryan Tunnicliffe	Unattached	Free transfer	2 years	19 September 2023	
42	MF	(Lebanon) Austin Ayoubi	(Australia) North Eastern MetroStars	Free transfer	7 months	20 November 2023	
6	MF	Stefan Mauk	Unattached	Free transfer	3.5 years	2 February 2024	
19	FW	Yaya Dukuly	(France) Reims	Free transfer	2.5 years	7 February 2024	

==== From youth squad ====
N	Pos.	Nat.	Name	Age	Notes
43	DF	(Australia)	Giuseppe Bovalina	18	scholarship
51	DF	(Australia)	Panagiotis Kikianis	18	1-year scholarship
54	DF	(Australia)	Bailey O'Neil	17	2-year scholarship
62	MF	(Australia)	Fabian Talladira	18	3-year scholarship

=== Transfers out ===
No.	Position	Player	Transferred to	Type/fee	Date	Ref
28	MF	(Spain) Juande	Unattached	End of contract	23 May 2023	
14	FW	George Blackwood	Unattached	End of contract	4 July 2023	
47	FW	Asad Kasumovic	Unattached	End of contract	4 July 2023	
6	MF	Louis D'Arrigo	(Poland) Lechia Gdańsk	End of contract	6 September 2023	
11	FW	Craig Goodwin	(Saudi Arabia) Al Wehda	Undisclosed fee	8 September 2023	
31	MF	Bernardo	Macarthur FC	Mutual contract termination	16 January 2024	
50	GK	Steven Hall	(England) Brighton & Hove Albion	Undisclosed fee	26 January 2024	
41	DF	Alexandar Popovic	(South Korea) Gwangju	Undisclosed fee	31 January 2024	
46	GK	Joe Gauci	(England) Aston Villa	Undisclosed fee	2 February 2024	
43	DF	Giuseppe Bovalina	(Canada) Vancouver Whitecaps	Undisclosed fee	24 April 2024	

=== Contract extensions ===
No.	Player	Position	Duration	Date	Notes	Ref.
21	(Spain) Javi López	Right-back	1 year	10 July 2023		
27	Josh Cavallo	Central midfielder	2 years	11 July 2023		
55	Ethan Alagich	Central midfielder	2 years	12 July 2023		
23	Luke Duzel	Central midfielder	3 years	17 July 2023		
40	Ethan Cox	Goalkeeper	2 years	18 July 2023	Scholarship contract.	
17	Luka Jovanovic	Striker	3 years	19 July 2023	New 3-year contract, replacing previous scholarship contract which was until end of 2023–24.	
37	Jonny Yull	Central midfielder	3 years	9 August 2023	New 3-year contract, replacing previous scholarship contract which was until end of 2023–24.	
36	Panashe Madanha	Right-back	3 years	5 October 2023	New 3-year contract, replacing previous contract which was until end of 2023–24.	
10	(England) Zach Clough	Attacking midfielder	2 years	6 December 2023	Contract extended until the end of 2025–26.	
1	James Delianov	Goalkeeper	3 years	26 March 2024	Contract extended until the end of 2026–27.	

== Pre-season and friendlies ==
18 July 2023	The Cove	1–8	Adelaide United	Adelaide
18:30		Report	Jovanovic; Irankunda; Bernardo; Clough (pen.); Carocci; Crawford; Porter	Stadium: Southern Soccer Facility

25 July 2023	FK Beograd	4–2	Adelaide United	Adelaide
18:30		Report		Stadium: Frank Mitchell Park

29 July 2023	Campbelltown City	Cancelled	Adelaide United	Adelaide
10:00		Source		Stadium: Steve Woodcock Sports Centre

27 September 2023	Melbourne Victory	0–1	Adelaide United	Melbourne
		Report	Kitto 37'	Stadium: AAMI Park; Attendance: 0 (behind closed doors)

6 October 2023	Adelaide United	1–0	Western Sydney Wanderers	Adelaide
15:00	Barr 90'	Report		Stadium: Coopers Stadium; Attendance: 0 (behind closed doors)

12 October 2023	Adelaide United	0–0	Western United	Adelaide
		Report		Stadium: Coopers Stadium; Attendance: 0 (behind closed doors)

== Competitions ==
=== Overall record ===
Competition	First match	Last match	Starting round	Final position	Record							
Competition	First match	Last match	Starting round	Final position	Pld	W	D	L	GF	GA	GD	Win %
A-League Men	20 October 2023	1 May 2024	Matchday 1	8th	27	9	5	13	52	53	−1	33.33
Australia Cup	14 August 2023	29 August 2023	Round of 32	Round of 16	2	1	0	1	3	5	−2	50.00
Total					29	10	5	14	55	58	−3	34.48

Last updated: 1 May 2024
Source: Soccerway

=== A-League Men ===
==== League table ====
Pos	Team	Pld	W	D	L	GF	GA	GD	Pts	Qualification
6	Melbourne City	27	11	6	10	50	38	+12	39	Qualification for Finals series (Note: The top two teams enter the finals series at the semi-finals, while the teams ranked third to sixth enter the finals series at the elimination-finals.)
7	Western Sydney Wanderers	27	11	4	12	44	48	−4	37	
8	Adelaide United	27	9	5	13	52	53	−1	32	
9	Brisbane Roar	27	8	6	13	42	55	−13	30	Qualification for 2024 Australia Cup play-offs
10	Newcastle Jets	27	6	10	11	39	47	−8	28	Qualification for 2024 Australia Cup play-offs

Source: A-Leagues
Rules for classification: 1) points; 2) wins; 3) goal difference; 4) goals scored; 5) head-to-head results; 5a) head-to-head points; 5b) head-to-head goal difference; 6) Fair Play points; 7) away goal difference; 8) away goals per match; 9) home goal difference; 10) home goals per match; 11) toss of a coin in an event of a tie of two clubs.

==== Results summary ====
Home figures include Adelaide United's 4–3 win on neutral ground against Sydney FC on 13 January 2024.

Overall								Home						Away					
Pld	W	D	L	GF	GA	GD	Pts	W	D	L	GF	GA	GD	W	D	L	GF	GA	GD
27	9	5	13	52	53	−1	32	5	3	6	30	28	+2	4	2	7	22	25	−3

Last updated: 1 May 2024.
Source: Ultimate A-League

==== Results by round ====
Round	1	2	3	4	5	6	7	8	9	10	11	12	27	14	15	16	17	18	19	20	21	22	23	24	13	26	25
Ground	H	H	A	H	A	A	H	A	H	A	H	H	N	A	A	H	A	A	H	A	H	A	H	H	A	A	A
Result	W	W	D	L	W	L	L	L	W	L	D	D	W	L	L	D	L	L	L	L	W	W	W	L	D	W	L
Position	1	1	1	5	3	5	6	7	6	8	8	8	5	8	8	9	9	10	10	11	9	9	9	9	8	8	8
Points	3	6	7	7	10	10	10	10	13	13	14	15	18	18	18	19	19	19	19	19	22	25	28	28	29	32	32

Updated to match(es) played on 1 May 2024. Source: Ultimate A-League
A = Away; H = Home; N = Neutral; W = Win; D = Draw; L = Loss

==== Matches ====
The fixtures for the 2023–24 A-League Men season were released on 24 August 2023. Unite Round was announced on 18 October 2023, increasing the season's length to 27 games.

Win Draw Loss Fixtures

20 October 2023 1	Adelaide United	3–0	Central Coast Mariners	Adelaide
19:15 ACDT	Halloran 38'; Clough 64' (pen.); Ansell 80'	Report		Stadium: Coopers Stadium; Attendance: 9,557; Referee: Alex King

29 October 2023 2	Adelaide United	6–0	Melbourne City	Adelaide
18:30 ACDT	Irankunda 14'; Talbot 29' (o.g.); Tunnicliffe 75'; Toure 81'; Bernardo 88', 90+4'	Report		Stadium: Coopers Stadium; Attendance: 10,628; Referee: Shaun Evans
Note: The match was originally scheduled for 28 October 2023 at 19:30 ACDT, but was moved back a day due to Melbourne City's Champions League match against Buriram United on 25 October 2023.

4 November 2023 3	Melbourne Victory	1–1	Adelaide United	Melbourne
19:45 AEDT	Fornaroli 28'	Report	Ibusuki 59'	Stadium: AAMI Park; Attendance: 15,229; Referee: Alex King

11 November 2023 4	Adelaide United	1–5	Sydney FC	Adelaide
19:15 ACDT	Clough 67' (pen.)	Report	Lolley 4', 13'; Kucharski 31', 44'; Gomes 46'	Stadium: Coopers Stadium; Attendance: 12,859; Referee: Adam Kersey

26 November 2023 5	Western United	1–3	Adelaide United	Ballarat
17:00 AEDT	Wales 53'	Report	Halloran 30'; Popovic 56'; Jovanovic 63'	Stadium: Mars Stadium; Attendance: 2,497; Referee: Jonathan Barreiro

4 December 2023 6	Macarthur FC	4–3	Adelaide United	Sydney
19:00 AEDT	Germain 8'; Millar 24'; Hollman 82'; Dávila 84'	Report	Clough 17', 53'; Bovalina 45+2'	Stadium: Campbelltown Sports Stadium; Attendance: 2,596; Referee: Shaun Evans
Note: The match was originally scheduled for 3 December 2023 at 17:00 AEDT, but was moved back a day due to Macarthur's AFC Cup match against Shan United on 30 November 2023.

10 December 2023 7	Adelaide United	0–2	Brisbane Roar	Adelaide
14:30 ACDT		Report	Lofthouse 47'; O'Shea 54' (pen.)	Stadium: Coopers Stadium; Attendance: 7,233; Referee: Alex King

15 December 2023 8	Western Sydney Wanderers	1–0	Adelaide United	Sydney
19:45 AEDT	Pierias 23'	Report		Stadium: CommBank Stadium; Attendance: 8,034; Referee: Alireza Faghani

22 December 2023 9	Adelaide United	3–1	Newcastle Jets	Adelaide
19:15 ACDT	Ibusuki 14'; Clough 68' (pen.); Halloran 70'	Report	Vidic 89'	Stadium: Coopers Stadium; Attendance: 10,064; Referee: Ben Abraham

30 December 2023 10	Melbourne Victory	2–0	Adelaide United	Melbourne
19:45 AEDT	Machach 73'; Fornaroli 90'	Report		Stadium: AAMI Park; Attendance: 15,216; Referee: Daniel Elder

4 January 2024 11	Adelaide United	2–2	Wellington Phoenix	Adelaide
19:15 ACDT	Ibusuki 26', 55'	Report	Barbarouses 15', 46'	Stadium: Coopers Stadium; Attendance: 11,187; Referee: Jonathan Barreiro

8 January 2024 12	Adelaide United	1–1	Macarthur FC	Adelaide
19:15 ACDT	Halloran 16'	Report	Germain 32'	Stadium: Coopers Stadium; Attendance: 9,426; Referee: Jack Morgan
Note: The match was originally scheduled for 14 January 2024 at 16:30 ACDT, but was brought forward six days due to the scheduling of Unite Round.

13 January 2024 27	Adelaide United	4–3	Sydney FC	Sydney
20:00 AEDT	Ibusuki 24', 34', 73'; Irankunda 45+5'	Report	Cáceres 7'; Lolley 76', 90+5'	Stadium: Allianz Stadium; Attendance: 11,918; Referee: Alex King

25 January 2024 14	Melbourne City	1–0	Adelaide United	Melbourne
19:45 AEDT	Antonis 5'	Report		Stadium: AAMI Park; Attendance: 6,092; Referee: Ben Abraham

3 February 2024 15	Adelaide United	0–4	Central Coast Mariners	Adelaide
19:15 ACDT		Report	Theoharous 31'; Torres 43', 45+2'; Reec 90' (pen.)	Stadium: Coopers Stadium; Attendance: 11,538; Referee: Daniel Elder

9 February 2024 16	Adelaide United	3–3	Perth Glory	Adelaide
19:15 ACDT	Halloran 9'; Clough 17' (pen.); Kikianis 90+8'	Report	Taggart 31'; Williams 63'; Rawlins 82'	Stadium: Coopers Stadium; Attendance: 8,135; Referee: Ben Abraham

17 February 2024 17	Sydney FC	2–1	Adelaide United	Sydney
18:00 AEDT	Mak 27'; Gomes 84' (pen.)	Report	López 90+4'	Stadium: Allianz Stadium; Attendance: 14,084; Referee: Alex King

24 February 2024 18	Adelaide United	1–2	Western Sydney Wanderers	Adelaide
19:15 ACDT	Jovanovic 90+4'	Report	Milanovic 18', 35'	Stadium: Coopers Stadium; Attendance: 8,908; Referee: Alex King

3 March 2024 19	Wellington Phoenix	3–2	Adelaide United	Wellington
17:00 NZDT	Old 36', 78'; van Hattum 69'	Report	Jovanovic 60' (pen.); Ibusuki 90+4'	Stadium: Sky Stadium; Attendance: 7,207; Referee: Jack Morgan

9 March 2024 20	Adelaide United	1–2	Melbourne Victory	Adelaide
19:15 ACDT	Irankunda 51'	Report	Fornaroli 33', 57' (pen.)	Stadium: Coopers Stadium; Attendance: 8,731; Referee: Alireza Faghani

15 March 2024 21	Newcastle Jets	0–1	Adelaide United	Newcastle
19:45 AEDT		Report	Jovanovic 80'	Stadium: McDonald Jones Stadium; Attendance: 4,103; Referee: Daniel Elder

29 March 2024 22	Adelaide United	4–1	Western United	Adelaide
19:15 ACDT	Irankunda 19', 46', 48'; Clough 80' (pen.)	Report	Ruhs 50'	Stadium: Coopers Stadium; Attendance: 9,623; Referee: Adam Kersey

7 April 2024 23	Perth Glory	2–4	Adelaide United	Perth
15:00 AWST	Taggart 22', 27'	Report	Ibusuki 30', 50'; Clough 41'; Mauk 45+6'	Stadium: HBF Park; Attendance: 5,338; Referee: Adam Bavcar

12 April 2024 24	Adelaide United	1–2	Macarthur FC	Adelaide
19:15 ACST	Irankunda 21'	Report	Piol 84'; Smith 88'	Stadium: Coopers Stadium; Attendance: 12,562; Referee: Ben Abraham

16 April 2024 13	Western United	3–3	Adelaide United	Tarneit
19:00 AEST	Grimaldi 19'; Donachie 34'; O'Toole 90+4'	Report	Ibusuki 45+7' (pen.), 57'; Irankunda 62'	Stadium: Wyndham Regional Football Facility; Attendance: 2,086; Referee: Jack Morgan
Note: The match was originally scheduled for 20 January 2024 at 17:30 AEDT, but was postponed due to Western United not having a suitable venue available.

26 April 2024 26	Brisbane Roar	3–4	Adelaide United	Brisbane
19:45 AEST	Hore 3', 83'; Waddingham 78'	Report	Ibusuki 39', 47'; Mauk 64'; Van der Saag 74'	Stadium: Suncorp Stadium; Attendance: 7,051; Referee: Lachlan Keevers

1 May 2024 25	Central Coast Mariners	2–0	Adelaide United	Gosford
19:00 AEST	Farrell 36'; Balard 76'	Report		Stadium: Industree Group Stadium; Attendance: 6,214; Referee: Alex King
Note: The match was postponed due to Central Coast Mariners' return flight from their AFC Cup match against Abdysha-Ata Kant on 17 April 2024 being delayed due to severe weather in the area.

=== Australia Cup ===
The Round of 32 fixtures were drawn on 28 June 2023, with the date, time and venue confirmed on 5 July 2023. The Round of 16 fixtures were drawn on 14 August 2023, following their win over Northcote City, and the match details were confirmed on 18 August 2023.

Win Draw Loss

14 August 2023 Round of 32	Northcote City	0–2	Adelaide United	Melbourne
19:30 AEST		Report	Goodwin 6'; Clough 85'	Stadium: John Cain Memorial Park; Attendance: 1,652; Referee: Jack Morgan

29 August 2023 Round of 16	Western Sydney Wanderers	5–1	Adelaide United	Sydney
19:30 AEST	Antonsson 2', 45+1'; Borello 38', 56'; Ninković 53'	Report	Clough 81'	Stadium: Marconi Stadium; Attendance: 2,490; Referee: Ben Abraham

== Statistics ==
=== Appearances and goals ===
Includes all competitions. Players with no appearances not included in the list.

As of 1 May 2024

No.	Pos.	Nat.	Player	A-League Men		Australia Cup		Total		Ref			
No.	Pos.	Nat.	Player	Apps	Goals	Apps	Goals	Apps	Goals	Ref			
No.	Pos.	Nat.	Player	1	GK	(Australia)	James Delianov	16	0	0	0	16	0
2	DF	(Australia)	Harry Van der Saag	6+4	1	0	0	10	1				
3	DF	(Australia)	Ben Warland	11+3	0	2	0	16	0				
4	DF	(Australia)	Nick Ansell	19	1	0	0	19	1				
6	MF	(Australia)	Stefan Mauk	11+1	2	0	0	12	2				
7	DF	(Australia)	Ryan Kitto	24+2	0	2	0	28	0				
8	MF	(Spain)	Isaías	24+1	0	2	0	27	0				
9	FW	(Japan)	Hiroshi Ibusuki	20+6	15	0	0	26	15				
10	MF	(England)	Zach Clough	26	8	2	2	28	10				
13	DF	(Australia)	Lachlan Barr	1+1	0	0+1	0	3	0				
17	FW	(Australia)	Luka Jovanovic	9+15	4	0+2	0	26	4				
19	FW	(Australia)	Yaya Dukuly	0+3	0	0	0	3	0				
21	DF	(Spain)	Javi López	11+4	1	0	0	15	1				
22	MF	(England)	Ryan Tunnicliffe	10+12	1	0	0	22	1				
23	MF	(Australia)	Luke Duzel	2+15	0	0	0	17	0				
26	FW	(Australia)	Ben Halloran	13+9	4	2	0	24	4				
27	DF	(Australia)	Joshua Cavallo	2+2	0	0	0	4	0				
36	DF	(Australia)	Panashe Madanha	3+3	0	0	0	6	0				
37	MF	(Australia)	Jonny Yull	11+7	0	2	0	20	0				
40	GK	(Australia)	Ethan Cox	1	0	0	0	1	0				
42	MF	(Lebanon)	Austin Ayoubi	2+5	0	0	0	7	0				
49	FW	(Australia)	Musa Toure	0+10	1	0	0	10	1				
51	DF	(Australia)	Panagiotis Kikianis	5	1	0	0	5	1				
55	MF	(Australia)	Ethan Alagich	13+5	0	0+2	0	20	0				
56	FW	(Australia)	Jake Porter	0	0	0+1	0	1	0				
62	MF	(Australia)	Fabian Talladira	0	0	0+2	0	2	0				
66	FW	(Australia)	Nestory Irankunda	18+7	8	0+1	0	26	8				
Player(s) transferred out but featured this season
11	FW	(Australia)	Craig Goodwin	0	0	2	1	2	1				
31	FW	(Australia)	Bernardo	1+7	2	2	0	10	2				
41	DF	(Australia)	Alexandar Popovic	12	1	2	0	14	1				
43	DF	(Australia)	Giuseppe Bovalina	16+5	1	2	0	23	1				
46	GK	(Australia)	Joe Gauci	10	0	2	0	12	0				

=== Disciplinary record ===
Includes all competitions. The list is sorted by squad number when total cards are equal. Players with no cards not included in the list.

As of 1 May 2024

Rank	No.	Pos.	Nat.	Player	A-League Men			Australia Cup			Total			Ref
Rank	No.	Pos.	Nat.	Player	Yellow card	(yellow card) (yellow-red card)	Red card	Yellow card	(yellow card) (yellow-red card)	Red card	Yellow card	(yellow card) (yellow-red card)	Red card	Ref
1	3	DF	(Australia)	Ben Warland	2	0	1	0	0	0	2	0	1	
2	26	FW	(Australia)	Ben Halloran	1	0	1	0	0	0	1	0	1	
3	66	FW	(Australia)	Nestory Irankunda	8	1	0	0	0	0	8	1	0	
4	8	MF	(Spain)	Isaías	6	0	0	0	0	0	6	0	0	
5	6	MF	(Australia)	Stefan Mauk	4	0	0	0	0	0	4	0	0	
6	21	DF	(Spain)	Javi López	3	0	0	0	0	0	3	0	0	
6	22	MF	(England)	Ryan Tunnicliffe	3	0	0	0	0	0	3	0	0	
8	2	DF	(Australia)	Harry Van der Saag	2	0	0	0	0	0	2	0	0	
8	9	FW	(Japan)	Hiroshi Ibusuki	2	0	0	0	0	0	2	0	0	
8	10	MF	(England)	Zach Clough	2	0	0	0	0	0	2	0	0	
8	17	FW	(Australia)	Luka Jovanovic	2	0	0	0	0	0	2	0	0	
8	36	DF	(Australia)	Panashe Madanha	2	0	0	0	0	0	2	0	0	
13	4	DF	(Australia)	Nick Ansell	1	0	0	0	0	0	1	0	0	
13	7	DF	(Australia)	Ryan Kitto	1	0	0	0	0	0	1	0	0	
13	23	MF	(Australia)	Luke Duzel	1	0	0	0	0	0	1	0	0	
13	27	MF	(Australia)	Josh Cavallo	1	0	0	0	0	0	1	0	0	
13	37	MF	(Australia)	Jonny Yull	1	0	0	0	0	0	1	0	0	
13	49	FW	(Australia)	Musa Toure	1	0	0	0	0	0	1	0	0	
13	55	MF	(Australia)	Ethan Alagich	1	0	0	0	0	0	1	0	0	
Player(s) transferred out but featured this season
1	41	DF	(Australia)	Alexandar Popovic	2	0	0	1	0	0	3	0	0	
2	43	DF	(Australia)	Giuseppe Bovalina	1	0	0	0	0	0	1	0	0	
Total					47	1	2	1	0	0	48	1	2	

=== Clean sheets ===
Includes all competitions. The list is sorted by squad number when total clean sheets are equal. Numbers in parentheses represent games where both goalkeepers participated and both kept a clean sheet; the number in parentheses is awarded to the goalkeeper who was substituted on, whilst a full clean sheet is awarded to the goalkeeper who was on the field at the start of play. Goalkeepers with no clean sheets not included in the list.

As of 1 May 2024

Rank	No.	Nat.	Goalkeeper	A-League Men	Australia Cup	Total
1	46	(Australia)	Joe Gauci	2	1	3
2	1	(Australia)	James Delianov	1	0	1
Total				3	1	4

== Awards ==
Adelaide United's annual awards ceremony, the Alagich Vidmar Awards (named after Dianne Alagich and Aurelio Vidmar), took place on 15 May 2024.

Zach Clough won the Aurelio Vidmar Medal as the best performing player across the season. Hiroshi Ibusuki won the most awards of the night, the Players' Player of the Season, Members' Player of the Season, and the Golden Boot. Nestory Irankunda, Giuseppe Bovalina and Panagiotis Kikianis also won awards.

Award	Recipient	Ref
Aurelio Vidmar Medal	(England) Zach Clough	
Players' Player of the Season	(Japan) Hiroshi Ibusuki	
Red Army's Player of the Season	(Australia) Nestory Irankunda	
Members' Player of the Season	(Japan) Hiroshi Ibusuki	
Golden Boot	(Japan) Hiroshi Ibusuki	
Rising Star	(Australia) Giuseppe Bovalina	
Youth Player of the Season	(Australia) Panagiotis Kikianis	

=== Player of the month ===
Month	Player
October	(Australia) Nestory Irankunda
November	(Australia) Joe Gauci
December	(England) Zach Clough
January	(Japan) Hiroshi Ibusuki
February	(England) Zach Clough
March	(Australia) Nestory Irankunda
April	(Japan) Hiroshi Ibusuki

=== Team of 20 Years ===
On 23 January 2024, to celebrate the club's 20th anniversary, Adelaide United announced their fan-voted team of 20 years, which featured numerous current and past players from both the men's and women's team.

Position	Player	Apps	Current team
Goalkeepers	(Australia) Eugene Galekovic	285	(Australia) Adelaide United (goalkeeper coach)
Goalkeepers	(Australia) Annalee Grove (Note: Played for Adelaide United's women's side.)	46	(Australia) Adelaide United
Defenders	(Australia) Richie Alagich	121	Retired
Defenders	(Australia) Georgia Campagnale	72	Unattached
Defenders	(Brazil) Cássio	158	Retired
Defenders	(Australia) Angelo Costanzo	107	Retired
Defenders	(Australia) Michael Marrone	193	(Australia) Sturt Lions
Defenders	(Australia) Sasa Ognenovski	36	(Australia) Preston Lions (director of football)
Defenders	(Australia) Michael Valkanis	104	(Netherlands) Ajax (assistant coach)
Midfielders	(Argentina) Marcelo Carrusca	123	(Australia) Adelaide United (head of junior development)
Midfielders	(Australia) Chelsie Dawber	61	(Australia) Adelaide United
Midfielders	(Australia) Travis Dodd	183	(Australia) Croydon FC (head coach)
Midfielders	(Argentina) Marcos Flores	38	Retired
Midfielders	(Australia) Craig Goodwin	168	(Saudi Arabia) Al Wehda
Midfielders	(Australia) Dylan Holmes	81	(Australia) Adelaide United
Midfielders	(Spain) Isaías	250	(Australia) Adelaide United
Forwards	(Australia) Bruce Djite	165	Retired
Forwards	(Australia) Racheal Quigley	66	(Australia) West Adelaide
Forwards	(Indonesia) Sergio van Dijk	71	Retired
Forwards	(Australia) Carl Veart	88	(Australia) Adelaide United (manager)
Head coach	(Spain) Guillermo Amor	—	Retired
Assistant coach	(Australia) John Kosmina	—	Retired

== See also ==
- 2023–24 Adelaide United FC (A-League Women) season
