= 2022–23 Adelaide United FC season =

18th season in existence of Adelaide United FC

Adelaide United
2022–23 season
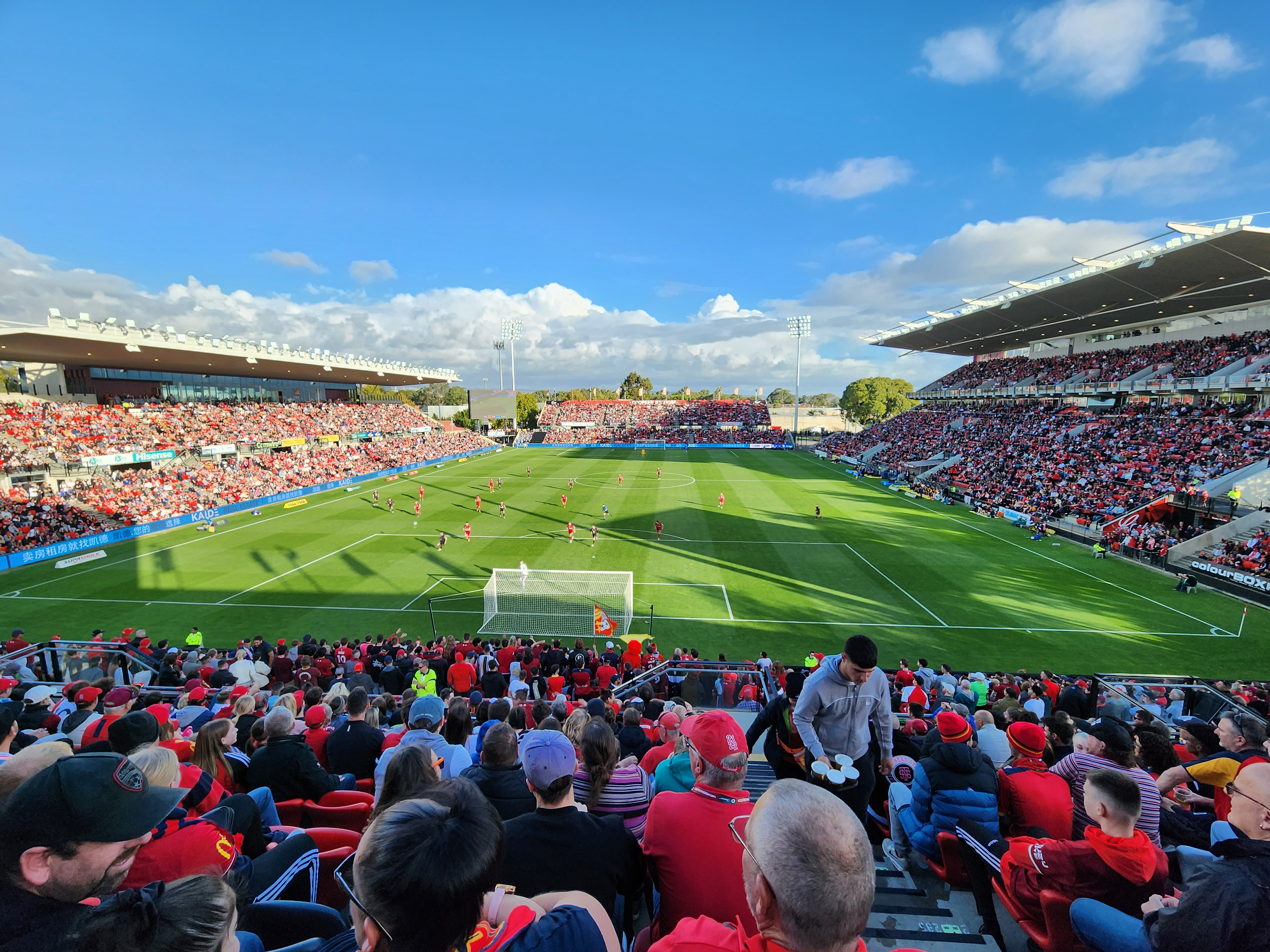
- Adelaide United playing against Sydney FC in April 2023
- Owner: Cor Adriaanse, Rob van Eck, and Yu Lidong
- Chairman: Piet van der Pol (to 4 April 2023); Ned Morris (from 4 April 2023)
- Head Coach: Carl Veart
- Stadium: Coopers Stadium
- A-League Men: 3rd
- A-League Men Finals: Semi-finals
- Australia Cup: Quarter-finals
- Top goalscorer: League: Craig Goodwin (15); All: Craig Goodwin (15)
- Highest home attendance: 14,056 vs. Sydney FC (7 April 2023); A-League Men
- Lowest home attendance: 2,511 vs. Brisbane Roar (31 August 2022); Australia Cup
- Average home league attendance: 10,359
- Biggest win: 5–1 vs. Wellington Phoenix (H) (17 March 2023); A-League Men
- Biggest defeat: 0–4 vs. Central Coast Mariners (A) (7 January 2023); A-League Men
Home colours	Away colours

The 2022–23 season was the club's 19th in the history of Adelaide United Football Club since its establishment in 2003. The club participated in the A-League Men for the 18th time, and the Australia Cup for the 8th time.

== Players ==
=== Squad information ===
Note: Flags indicate national team as defined under FIFA eligibility rules; some limited exceptions apply. Players may hold more than one non-FIFA nationality.

No.	Pos.	Nation	Player
1	GK	AUS	James Delianov
2	DF	AUS	Harry Van der Saag
3	DF	AUS	Ben Warland
4	DF	AUS	Nick Ansell
6	MF	AUS	Louis D'Arrigo
7	DF	AUS	Ryan Kitto
8	MF	ESP	Isaías
9	FW	JPN	Hiroshi Ibusuki
10	FW	ENG	Zach Clough
11	FW	AUS	Craig Goodwin (captain)
13	DF	AUS	Lachlan Barr
14	FW	AUS	George Blackwood
18	MF	AUS	Jay Barnett
21	DF	ESP	Javi López
23	MF	AUS	Luke Duzel

No.	Pos.	Nation	Player
26	FW	AUS	Ben Halloran
27	DF	AUS	Josh Cavallo
28	MF	ESP	Juande
31	MF	AUS	Bernardo
35	FW	AUS	Luka Jovanovic (scholarship)
36	FW	AUS	Panashe Madanha (scholarship)
37	MF	AUS	Jonny Yull (scholarship)
40	GK	AUS	Ethan Cox (scholarship)
41	DF	AUS	Alexandar Popovic
46	GK	AUS	Joe Gauci
47	FW	AUS	Asad Kasumovic (scholarship)
49	FW	AUS	Musa Toure (scholarship)
50	GK	AUS	Steven Hall (scholarship)
55	MF	AUS	Ethan Alagich (scholarship)
66	FW	AUS	Nestory Irankunda (scholarship)

== Transfers ==
=== Transfers in ===
No.	Position	Player	From	Type/fee	Contract length	Date	Ref
2	DF	Harry Van Der Saag	Unattached	Free transfer	2 years	8 June 2022	
3	DF	Ben Warland	Sydney FC	Free transfer	2 years	27 June 2022	
26	FW	Ben Halloran	Unattached	Free transfer	2 years	3 August 2022	
33	FW	Joshua Mori	(Australia) Beograd	Injury replacement for Bernardo	3 months	20 October 2022	
18	MF	Jay Barnett	Melbourne Victory	Free transfer	2.5 years	8 February 2023	
23	MF	Luke Duzel	Western United	Free transfer	4 months	8 February 2023	

==== From youth squad ====
N	Pos.	Nat.	Name	Age	Notes
50	GK	(Australia)	Steven Hall	17	3-year scholarship
35	FW	(Australia)	Luka Jovanovic	17	2-year scholarship
36	FW	(Australia)	Panashe Madanha	17	2-year scholarship
49	FW	(Australia)	Musa Toure	17	1-year scholarship

=== Transfers out ===
No.	Position	Player	Transferred to	Type/fee	Date	Ref
3	DF	George Timotheou	Unattached	Free transfer	30 May 2022	
9	FW	Kusini Yengi	Unattached	Free transfer	30 May 2022	
18	MF	Joe Caletti	Unattached	Free transfer	30 May 2022	
23	DF	Jacob Tratt	Unattached	Free transfer	30 May 2022	
17	FW	Mohamed Toure	(France) Reims	Undisclosed fee	3 June 2022	
19	FW	Yaya Dukuly	(France) Reims	Undisclosed fee	3 June 2022	
22	DF	(Denmark) Michael Jakobsen	Unattached	End of contract	7 June 2022	
77	MF	Lachlan Brook	(England) Brentford	End of loan	1 July 2022	
16	MF	Nathan Konstandopoulos	Melbourne Victory	Mutual contract termination	14 September 2022	
33	FW	Joshua Mori	Unattached	End of contract	8 December 2022	

=== Contract extensions ===
No.	Player	Position	Duration	Date	Notes	Ref.
21	(Spain) Javi López	Full-back	1 year	31 May 2022		
28	(Spain) Juande	Defensive midfielder	1 year	31 May 2022		
15	(Japan) Hiroshi Ibusuki	Striker	2 years	6 June 2022		
20	(England) Zach Clough	Attacking midfielder	2 years	6 June 2022		
41	Alexandar Popovic	Centre-back	2 years	9 June 2022		
25	Lachlan Barr	Centre-back	2 years	9 June 2022		
4	Nick Ansell	Centre-back	2 years	15 June 2022		
31	Bernardo Oliveira	Winger	2 years	21 June 2022	Contract extended from end of 2022–23 until end of 2024–25.	
1	James Delianov	Goalkeeper	2 years	23 June 2022		
16	Nathan Konstandopoulos	Central midfielder	1 year	29 June 2022		
7	Ryan Kitto	Full-back	3 years	30 June 2022		
11	Craig Goodwin	Winger	3 years	21 July 2022	Permanent contract following loan.	
46	Joe Gauci	Goalkeeper	3 years	13 April 2023	Contract extended from end of 2022–23 until end of 2025–26.	

== Coaching staff ==
Position	Name	Ref.
Head coach	(Australia) Carl Veart	
Assistant coach	(Australia) Mark Milligan	
Assistant coach	(Australia) Damian Mori	
Assistant coach Head of youth football	(Brazil) Ayrton Andrioli	
Head of Football	(Australia) Vito Basile	
Goalkeeping coach	(Australia) Eugene Galekovic	
Strength and conditioning coach	(Australia) Django Gentilcore	

== Pre-season and friendlies ==
13 September 2022	Para Hills Knights (Australia)	0–9	Adelaide United	Adelaide
19:00 ACST		Report	Blackwood 3', 34', 42'; Ibusuki 14', 52'; Halloran 30'; Bernardo 65'; Toure 75', 83'	Stadium: Marden Sports Complex

15 September 2022	Adelaide Cobras (Australia)	0–2	Adelaide United	Adelaide
19:00 ACST		Report	Mori 13'; Crawford 67'	Stadium: Weigall Oval

17 September 2022	Adelaide United	2–3	Western United	Adelaide
11:00 ACST	Halloran 4', 37'	Report	Wenzel-Halls 56', 70'; Pierias 63'	Stadium: ServiceFM Stadium

24 September 2022	NPL SA Select (South Australia)	0–6	Adelaide United	Adelaide
11:00 ACST		Report	D'Arrigo 16', 56'; Halloran 25'; Clough 28'; Kasumovic 31'; Blackwood 88'	Stadium: Marden Sports Complex

30 September 2022	Melbourne City	1–5	Adelaide United	Melbourne
	Caputo 118'	Report	Barr 12'; Clough 37'; Blackwood 76'; Jovanovic 122'; Van Der Saag 133'	Stadium: Casey Fields; Attendance: 0 (behind closed doors)
Note: Match featured 3 periods of 45 minutes

29 November 2022	Western United	3–3	Adelaide United	Melbourne
	Milanovic ?', ?'; Pierias ?'	Report	Ibusuki ?'; Alagich ?'; Blackwood ?'	Stadium: The Hangar; Attendance: 0 (behind closed doors)

== Competitions ==
=== Overall record ===
Competition	First match	Last match	Starting round	Final position	Record							
Competition	First match	Last match	Starting round	Final position	Pld	W	D	L	GF	GA	GD	Win %
A-League Men	9 October 2022	29 April 2023	Matchday 1	3rd	26	11	9	6	53	46	+7	42.31
A-League Men Finals	5 May 2023	20 May 2023	Elimination-finals	Semi-finals	3	1	0	2	3	4	−1	33.33
Australia Cup	30 July 2022	31 August 2022	Round of 32	Quarter-finals	3	1	1	1	5	4	+1	33.33
Total					32	13	10	9	61	54	+7	40.63

Last updated: 20 May 2023
Source: Competitions

=== A-League Men ===
==== League table ====
Pos	Team	Pld	W	D	L	GF	GA	GD	Pts	Qualification
1	Melbourne City	26	16	7	3	61	32	+29	55	Qualification for AFC Champions League group stage and Finals series (Note: Determined by which of the Premiers for the 2021–22 or 2022–23 seasons accrued the most combined points over both seasons.)
2	Central Coast Mariners (C)	26	13	5	8	55	35	+20	44	Qualification for AFC Cup group stage and Finals series
3	Adelaide United	26	11	9	6	53	46	+7	42	Qualification for Finals series (Note: The top two teams enter the finals series at the semi-finals, while the teams ranked third to sixth enter the finals series at the elimination-finals.)
4	Western Sydney Wanderers	26	11	8	7	43	27	+16	41	Qualification for Finals series
5	Sydney FC	26	11	5	10	40	39	+1	38	Qualification for Finals series

Source: A-Leagues
Rules for classification: 1) Points; 2) Goal difference; 3) Goals scored; 4) Points per game; 5) Least red cards; 6) Least yellow cards; 7) Toss of a coin in an event of a tie of two clubs.
(C) Champions

==== Results summary ====
Overall								Home						Away					
Pld	W	D	L	GF	GA	GD	Pts	W	D	L	GF	GA	GD	W	D	L	GF	GA	GD
26	11	9	6	53	46	+7	42	7	3	3	26	17	+9	4	6	3	27	29	−2

Last updated: 28 April 2023.

==== Results by round ====
Round	1	2	3	4	5	6	7	8	9	10	11	12	13	14	15	16	17	18	19	20	21	22	23	24	25	26
Ground	A	A	A	H	A	H	A	A	H	H	A	H	H	A	H	A	H	A	H	A	H	A	H	H	A	H
Result	D	L	D	W	W	W	D	L	L	W	L	D	W	D	W	W	D	D	W	W	W	W	D	L	D	L
Position	4	9	9	6	3	3	3	3	5	4	6	6	5	5	4	3	3	4	3	2	2	2	2	2	2	3
Points	1	1	2	5	8	11	12	12	12	15	15	16	19	20	23	26	27	28	31	34	37	40	41	41	42	42

Updated to match(es) played on 28 April 2023. Source: Ultimate A-League
A = Away; H = Home; W = Win; D = Draw; L = Loss

==== Matches ====
9 October 2022 1	Wellington Phoenix	1–1	Adelaide United	Wellington
15:00 NZDT	Waine 75'	Report	Halloran 90+3'	Stadium: Sky Stadium; Attendance: 8,325; Referee: Ben Abraham

16 October 2022 2	Macarthur FC	2–0	Adelaide United	Campbelltown
15:00 AEDT	Arzani 27'; Rose 57'	Report		Stadium: Campbelltown Stadium; Attendance: 3,213; Referee: Shaun Evans

23 October 2022 3	Sydney FC	2–2	Adelaide United	Sydney
15:00 AEDT	Lolley 48'; Wood 52'	Report	Kitto 13'; Van Der Saag 58'	Stadium: Allianz Stadium; Attendance: 16,623; Referee: Daniel Elder

30 October 2022 4	Adelaide United	2–1	Perth Glory	Adelaide
14:30 ACDT	Goodwin 18'; Ibusuki 22'	Report	Colli 32'	Stadium: Coopers Stadium; Attendance: 7,183; Referee: Alireza Faghani

6 November 2022 5	Western United	2–4	Adelaide United	Melbourne
17:00 AEDT	Milanovic 53'; Pierias 90+1'	Report	Ibusuki 9'; Goodwin 22'; Lacroix 31' (o.g.); Halloran 79'	Stadium: AAMI Park; Attendance: 3,128; Referee: Alex King

11 November 2022 6	Adelaide United	3–0	Melbourne Victory	Adelaide
19:15 ACDT	Ibusuki 37'; Goodwin 86' (pen.); Warland 90+1'	Report		Stadium: Coopers Stadium; Attendance: 13,504; Referee: Adam Kersey

Mid-season break for 2022 FIFA World Cup

9 December 2022 7	Brisbane Roar	1–1	Adelaide United	Kippa-Ring
19:45 AEDT	O'Shea 90+4' (pen.)	Report	Blackwood 72'	Stadium: Kayo Stadium; Attendance: 4,258; Referee: Alex King

17 December 2022 8	Wellington Phoenix	3–1	Adelaide United	Wellington
15:00 NZDT	Zawada 2'; Kraev 37'; Sasse 61'	Report	Goodwin 12'	Stadium: Sky Stadium; Attendance: 4,535; Referee: Jonathan Barreiro

27 December 2022 9	Adelaide United	0–1	Newcastle Jets	Adelaide
19:15 ACDT		Report	Sotirio 25'	Stadium: Coopers Stadium; Attendance: 8,350; Referee: Ben Abraham

2 January 2023 10	Adelaide United	2–0	Perth Glory	Adelaide
19:15 ACDT	Barr 40'; Halloran 72'	Report		Stadium: Coopers Stadium; Attendance: 10,024; Referee: Jonathan Barreiro

7 January 2023 11	Central Coast Mariners	4–0	Adelaide United	Gosford
17:00 AEDT	Popovic 31' (o.g.); Nkololo 48'; Madanha 55' (o.g.); Farrell 58'	Report		Stadium: Industree Group Stadium; Attendance: 6,914; Referee: Alex King

14 January 2023 12	Adelaide United	1–1	Melbourne Victory	Adelaide
19:15 ACDT	Goodwin 7'	Report	D'Agostino 49'	Stadium: Coopers Stadium; Attendance: 11,168; Referee: Shaun Evans

20 January 2023 13	Adelaide United	1–0	Macarthur FC	Adelaide
19:15 ACDT	Clough 6'	Report		Stadium: Coopers Stadium; Attendance: 8,826; Referee: Kurt Ams

29 January 2023 14	Melbourne City	3–3	Adelaide United	Melbourne
15:00 AEDT	Lam 12'; Leckie 52'; Maclaren 90+1' (pen.)	Report	Blackwood 1'; Kitto 17'; Goodwin 43'	Stadium: AAMI Park; Attendance: 6,337; Referee: Adam Kersey

4 February 2023 15	Adelaide United	2–1	Brisbane Roar	Adelaide
19:15 ACDT	D'Arrigo 35'; Irankunda 82'		Knowles 37'	Stadium: Coopers Stadium; Attendance: 10,047; Referee: Alex King

11 February 2023 16	Western United	2–3	Adelaide United	Melbourne
17:00 AEDT	Botic 43'; Prijovic 48'	Report	Clough 68'; Kitto 76'; Goodwin 86' (pen.)	Stadium: AAMI Park; Attendance: 2,603; Referee: Shaun Evans

19 February 2023 17	Adelaide United	4–4	Western Sydney Wanderers	Adelaide
16:30 ACDT	Ibusuki 32' (pen.), 67'; Popovic 45+4'; Kitto 79'		Borrello 45+1', 50'; Nieuwenhof 63'; Layouni 90+5'	Stadium: Coopers Stadium; Attendance: 10,026; Referee: Jonathon Barreiro

26 February 2023 18	Melbourne Victory	1–1	Adelaide United	Melbourne
15:00 AEDT	Fornaroli 81' (pen.)	Report	Irankunda 87'	Stadium: AAMI Park; Attendance: 8,838; Referee: Chris Beath

3 March 2023 19	Adelaide United	4–2	Melbourne City	Adelaide
19:15 ACDT	Barr 45'; Goodwin 50'; D'Arrigo 57'; Irankunda 85'	Report	Nabbout 9'; Tilio 62'	Stadium: Coopers Stadium; Attendance: 10,270; Referee: Alireza Faghani

11 March 2023 20	Newcastle Jets	2–4	Adelaide United	Newcastle
19:45 AEDT	Hoffman 16'; Thurgate 45+3'	Report	Goodwin 12'; Clough 14'; Jovanovic 44'; Irankunda 65'	Stadium: McDonald Jones Stadium; Attendance: 4,839; Referee: Daniel Elder

17 March 2023 21	Adelaide United	5–1	Wellington Phoenix	Adelaide
19:15 ACDT	Wootton 16' (o.g.); Jovanovic 23'; Barr 51'; Ibusuki 62'; Goodwin 71'		Rufer 54' (pen.)	Stadium: Coopers Stadium; Attendance: 9,036; Referee: Alex King

31 March 2023 22	Western Sydney Wanderers	2–3	Adelaide United	Sydney
19:45 AEDT	Yengi 44'; Marcelo 60'	Report	Warland 37', 49'; Ibusuki 55'	Stadium: CommBank Stadium; Attendance: 9,014; Referee: Shaun Evans

7 April 2023 23	Adelaide United	1–1	Sydney FC	Adelaide
16:30 ACST	Goodwin 49'	Report	Le Fondre 82'	Stadium: Coopers Stadium; Attendance: 14,056; Referee: Alireza Faghani

16 April 2023 24	Adelaide United	0–1	Western United	Adelaide
16:30 ACST		Report	Pain 44'	Stadium: Coopers Stadium; Attendance: 10,110; Referee: Alex King

23 April 2023 25	Perth Glory	4–4	Adelaide United	Perth
16:00 AWST	Williams 32'; Taggart 60', 90+6'; Zimarino 90+3'	Report	Jovanovic 34'; Goodwin 51'; Kitto 78'; Irankunda 90+9'	Stadium: HBF Park; Attendance: 6,083; Referee: Jack Morgan

29 April 2023 26	Adelaide United	1–4	Central Coast Mariners	Adelaide
16:30 ACST	Kitto 90+3'	Report	Túlio 23', 57'; Nkololo 41'; Steele 87'	Stadium: Coopers Stadium; Attendance: 12,064; Referee: Chris Beath

==== Finals series ====
5 May 2023 Elimination-final	Adelaide United	2–0	Wellington Phoenix	Adelaide
19:45 ACST	Goodwin 19', 67' (pen.)	Report		Stadium: Coopers Stadium; Attendance: 10,231; Referee: Alireza Faghani

13 May 2023 Semi final	Adelaide United	1–2	Central Coast Mariners	Adelaide
19:45 ACST	Goodwin 4' (pen.)	Report	McGarry 15'; Cummings 38'	Stadium: Coopers Stadium; Attendance: 15,771; Referee: Alex King

20 May 2023 Semi final	Central Coast Mariners	2–0 (4–1 agg.)	Adelaide United	Gosford
19:45 AEST	Silvera 48'; Túlio 52'	Report		Stadium: Central Coast Stadium; Attendance: 20,059; Referee: Alireza Faghani

=== Australia Cup ===
30 July 2022 Round of 32	Newcastle Jets	0–2	Adelaide United	Newcastle
19:30 AEDT		Report	Blackwood 45'; Ibusuki 79'	Stadium: McDonald Jones Stadium; Attendance: 4,439; Referee: Kurt Ams

17 August 2022 Round of 16	Adelaide City (South Australia)	2–2 (a.e.t.) (1–4 p)	Adelaide United	Adelaide
19:00 ACST	Waters 76'; M. Dawber 109'	Report	Clough 27'; D'Arrigo 95'	Stadium: ServiceFM Stadium; Attendance: 3,327; Referee: Daniel Elder
	Penalties
	King-Byrne (penalty missed); Devereux (penalty scored); Waters (penalty missed)		(penalty scored) Juande; (penalty scored) Ibusuki; (penalty scored) Popovic; (penalty scored) Halloran

31 August 2022 Quarter-finals	Adelaide United	1–2	Brisbane Roar	Adelaide
19:00 ACST	Ibusuki 42'	Report	O'Shea 7'; Austin 31'	Stadium: ServiceFM Stadium; Attendance: 2,511; Referee: Tim Danaskos

== Statistics ==
=== Appearances and goals ===
Includes all competitions. Players with no appearances not included in the list.

As of 20 May 2023

No.	Pos.	Nat.	Player	A-League Men							
No.	Pos.	Nat.	Player	Regular season		Finals		Australia Cup		Total	
No.	Pos.	Nat.	Player	Apps	Goals	Apps	Goals	Apps	Goals	Apps	Goals
2	DF	(Australia)	Harry Van der Saag	3+3	1	0	0	3	0	9	1
3	DF	(Australia)	Ben Warland	16	3	3	0	0+1	0	20	3
4	DF	(Australia)	Nick Ansell	2+3	0	2	0	0	0	7	0
6	MF	(Australia)	Louis D'Arrigo	20+4	2	3	0	3	1	30	3
7	MF	(Australia)	Ryan Kitto	25	6	3	0	3	0	31	6
8	MF	(Spain)	Isaías	21+1	0	3	0	3	0	28	0
9	FW	(Japan)	Hiroshi Ibusuki	19+3	7	1+1	0	3	2	27	9
10	MF	(England)	Zach Clough	17	3	2	0	2	1	21	4
11	FW	(Australia)	Craig Goodwin	24+1	12	3	3	0	0	18	15
13	DF	(Australia)	Lachlan Barr	16	3	0+1	0	3	0	20	3
14	FW	(Australia)	George Blackwood	4+12	2	1+2	0	3	1	22	3
18	MF	(Australia)	Jay Barnett	3+2	0	1	0	0	0	6	0
21	DF	(Spain)	Javi López	24	0	3	0	0+2	0	29	0
23	MF	(Australia)	Luke Duzel	0+2	0	0+1	0	0	0	3	0
26	MF	(Australia)	Ben Halloran	24	3	3	0	1+1	0	29	3
27	MF	(Australia)	Josh Cavallo	2+5	0	0	0	0+3	0	10	0
28	MF	(Spain)	Juande	7+5	0	0	0	0+1	0	13	0
31	MF	(Australia)	Bernardo	0	0	0	0	1+2	0	3	0
35	FW	(Australia)	Luka Jovanovic	5+4	3	0	0	0	0	9	3
36	FW	(Australia)	Panashe Madanha	3+6	0	0+2	0	0+1	0	12	0
37	MF	(Australia)	Jonny Yull	2+5	0	0	0	0	0	7	0
41	DF	(Australia)	Alexandar Popovic	16+1	1	1	0	3	0	21	1
46	GK	(Australia)	Joe Gauci	26	0	3	0	3	0	32	0
47	MF	(Australia)	Asad Kasumovic	0+6	0	0	0	0+2	0	8	0
49	FW	(Australia)	Musa Toure	0+1	0	0	0	0	0	1	0
55	MF	(Australia)	Ethan Alagich	7+13	0	1+1	0	0+1	0	23	0
66	FW	(Australia)	Nestory Irankunda	0+19	5	0+3	0	0	0	22	5
Player(s) transferred out but featured this season
16	MF	(Australia)	Nathan Konstandopoulos	0	0	0	0	2+1	0	3	0
33	FW	(Australia)	Joshua Mori	0+1	0	0	0	0	0	1	0

=== Disciplinary record ===
Includes all competitions. The list is sorted by squad number when total cards are equal. Players with no cards not included in the list.

As of 20 May 2023

Rank	No.	Pos.	Nat.	Player	A-League Men			A-League Men Finals series			Australia Cup			Total		
Rank	No.	Pos.	Nat.	Player	Booked	(yellow card) (yellow-red card)	Sent off (straight red)	Booked	(yellow card) (yellow-red card)	Sent off (straight red)	Booked	(yellow card) (yellow-red card)	Sent off (straight red)	Booked	(yellow card) (yellow-red card)	Sent off (straight red)
1	9	FW	(Japan)	Hiroshi Ibusuki	1	0	1	0	0	0	0	0	1	1	0	2
2	8	MF	(Spain)	Isaías	4	1	1	1	0	0	2	0	0	7	1	1
3	3	DF	(Australia)	Ben Warland	2	0	1	0	0	0	0	0	0	2	0	1
4	26	MF	(Australia)	Ben Halloran	6	1	0	1	0	0	0	0	0	7	1	0
5	7	MF	(Australia)	Ryan Kitto	5	0	0	2	0	0	1	0	0	8	0	0
5	66	FW	(Australia)	Nestory Irankunda	7	0	0	1	0	0	0	0	0	8	0	0
7	41	DF	(Australia)	Alexandar Popovic	6	0	0	1	0	0	0	0	0	7	0	0
8	13	DF	(Australia)	Lachlan Barr	5	0	0	0	0	0	1	0	0	6	0	0
8	28	MF	(Spain)	Juande	6	0	0	0	0	0	0	0	0	6	0	0
10	55	MF	(Australia)	Ethan Alagich	4	0	0	1	0	0	0	0	0	5	0	0
11	6	MF	(Australia)	Louis D'Arrigo	3	0	0	0	0	0	0	0	0	3	0	0
11	10	MF	(England)	Zach Clough	3	0	0	0	0	0	0	0	0	3	0	0
11	11	FW	(Australia)	Craig Goodwin	3	0	0	0	0	0	0	0	0	3	0	0
11	21	DF	(Spain)	Javi López	3	0	0	0	0	0	0	0	0	3	0	0
11	46	GK	(Australia)	Joe Gauci	3	0	0	0	0	0	0	0	0	3	0	0
16	37	MF	(Australia)	Jonny Yull	2	0	0	0	0	0	0	0	0	2	0	0
17	2	DF	(Australia)	Harry Van der Saag	1	0	0	0	0	0	0	0	0	1	0	0
17	14	FW	(Australia)	George Blackwood	1	0	0	0	0	0	0	0	0	1	0	0
17	27	MF	(Australia)	Joshua Cavallo	0	0	0	0	0	0	1	0	0	1	0	0
17	31	MF	(Australia)	Bernardo Oliveira	0	0	0	0	0	0	1	0	0	1	0	0
17	49	FW	(Australia)	Musa Toure	1	0	0	0	0	0	0	0	0	1	0	0
Total					59	2	3	3	0	0	6	0	1	68	2	4

Note: Hiroshi Ibusuki's suspension for his red card on 23 October 2022 against Sydney FC was rescinded.

=== Clean sheets ===
Includes all competitions. The list is sorted by squad number when total clean sheets are equal. Numbers in parentheses represent games where both goalkeepers participated and both kept a clean sheet; the number in parentheses is awarded to the goalkeeper who was substituted on, whilst a full clean sheet is awarded to the goalkeeper who was on the field at the start of play. Goalkeepers with no clean sheets not included in the list.

As of 20 May 2023

Rank	No.	Nat.	Goalkeeper	A-League Men	A-League Men Finals Series	Australia Cup	Total
1	46	(Australia)	Joe Gauci	3	1	1	5
Total				3	1	1	5
