= Alex Popović =

Australian soccer player (born 2002)

Alexandar Popović
Personal information
- Full name: Alexandar John Popović
- Date of birth: 7 September 2002 (age 24)
- Place of birth: Adelaide, South Australia, Australia
- Height: 1.84 m (6 ft 0 in)
- Position: Centre-back

Team information
- Current team: Sydney FC
- Number: 41

Youth career
- Adelaide Comets
- SA NTC
- 2018–2022: Adelaide United

Senior career*
Years	Team	Apps	(Gls)
2020–2022	Adelaide United NPL	15	(1)
2022–2024	Adelaide United	40	(2)
2024–2025	Gwangju FC	10	(0)
2024–2025	→ Sydney FC (loan)	11	(0)
2025–	Sydney FC	24	(3)

International career^{‡}
2024–	Australia U23	4	(0)
Medal record
Men's football
Representing Australia
WAFF U-23 Championship
Runner-up	2024 Saudi Arabia
- * Club domestic league appearances and goals as of 2 May 2026 ‡ National team caps and goals as of 2 March 2025

Alexandar Popović (Serbian Cyrillic: Александар Поповић, Serbian: [aleksǎndar pǒpovitɕ]; born 7 September 2002) is an Australian professional soccer player who plays as a centre-back for A-League Men club Sydney FC and Australia under-23 national team.

== Club career ==
=== Adelaide United ===
Popović began his professional career at Adelaide United. He signed a scholarship contract prior to the 2021–22 season. Popović's highlights at the club mostly come against Western Sydney; his A-League Men debut on 16 March 2022, his first start only four days later on the 20th, and his first professional goal on 18 February 2023. Popović was selected in an A-League All Stars squad which would face Barcelona in an exhibition match in 2022. He was substituted on for Rhyan Grant in the 85th minute of play.

=== Gwangju FC ===
During the January transfer window of 2024, Adelaide United announced the sale of Popović to K League 1 club Gwangju.

=== Sydney FC ===
On 18 September 2024, Popović joined Sydney FC ahead of the 2024–25 A-League season on a loan deal until January. His debut for the club came the next day in a 5–0 win over Hong Kong Premier League side Eastern in the AFC Champions League Two. After impressing during his loan spell, he joined the Sky Blues on a permanent basis, signing a three-and-a-half-year contract, after Sydney agreed to terms with Gwangju.

On 17 February 2026, Popović scored his first goal for the club in a 1–1 draw with Auckland FC.

== International career ==
Popović was named in Tony Vidmar's Olyroos squad for a pair of friendly matches against Qatar and Saudi Arabia in November 2023.

== Career statistics ==
As of 2 May 2026

Club	Season	League			Cup		Continental		Total	
Club	Season	Division	Apps	Goals	Apps	Goals	Apps	Goals	Apps	Goals
Adelaide United	2021–22	A-League Men	10	0	0	0	—		10	0
Adelaide United	2022–23	A-League Men	18	1	3	0	—		21	1
Adelaide United	2023–24	A-League Men	12	1	2	0	—		14	1
Adelaide United	Total		40	2	5	0	0	0	45	2
Gwangju	2024	K League 1	10	0	2	0	—		12	0
Sydney FC (loan)	2024–25	A-League Men	11	0	0	0	5	0	16	0
Sydney FC	2024–25	A-League Men	5	0	0	0	2	0	7	0
Sydney FC	2025–26	A-League Men	19	3	3	0	—		22	3
Sydney FC	Total		35	3	3	0	7	0	45	3
Career total			85	5	10	0	7	0	102	5

== Honours ==
Australia U23

- WAFF U-23 Championship: runner-up 2024

Individual

- A-Leagues All Stars Game: 2022
