= Zach Clough =

English footballer (born 1995)

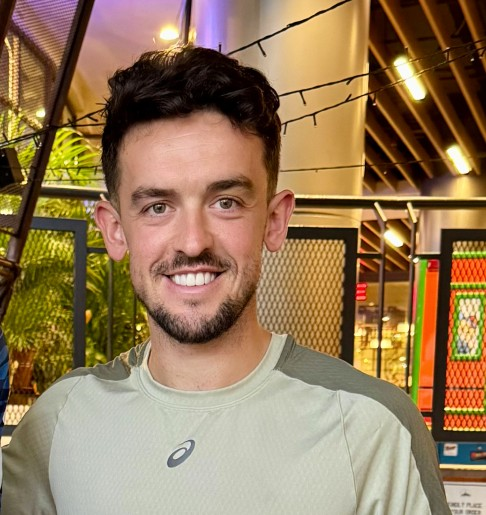
- Clough in 2025

Personal information
- Full name: Zach Paul John Clough
- Date of birth: 8 March 1995 (age 31)
- Place of birth: Denton, England
- Height: 1.70 m (5 ft 7 in)
- Positions: Attacking midfielder; striker

Team information
- Current team: Newcastle Jets
- Number: 10

Youth career
- 2003–2013: Bolton Wanderers

Senior career*
Years	Team	Apps	(Gls)
2013–2017	Bolton Wanderers	68	(22)
2017–2021	Nottingham Forest	31	(4)
2018	→ Bolton Wanderers (loan)	9	(1)
2018–2019	→ Rochdale (loan)	13	(1)
2021	Wigan Athletic	13	(1)
2021–2022	Carlisle United	23	(3)
2022–2025	Adelaide United	79	(18)
2025	Selangor	7	(0)
2026–	Newcastle Jets	4	(0)
- * Club domestic league appearances and goals as of 00:20, 21 July 2026 (UTC)

Zach Paul John Clough (born 8 March 1995) is an English professional footballer who plays as an attacking midfielder or striker for Newcastle Jets.

Clough started his career at Bolton Wanderers, having played for them since the age of eight. He established himself as a regular goal-scorer for Bolton, playing 68 games before being sold to Nottingham Forest. He later returned to Bolton on loan a year later, then had spells at different clubs in England. In February 2022, Clough signed for A-League Men side Adelaide United where he spent over 3 years before signing in the Malaysia Super League.

== Early life ==
Clough was born and raised in Denton, Greater Manchester. He attended Audenshaw School where he lifted the U14 Premier League Cup at Manchester United's Old Trafford after beating Forest School 2–1.

== Career ==
=== Bolton Wanderers ===
Clough came through the Bolton Wanderers academy having joined the club at the age of 8 then signing his first professional contract in April 2013. He made his debut for the first team aged 19 on 3 January 2015 when he started and scored the winning goal in a 1–0 home win against local rivals Wigan Athletic in the FA Cup third round. After the match Bolton manager Neil Lennon described Clough as a special player. Two days later he was rewarded with a contract extension until 2017. He scored two goals in three minutes on his senior league debut on 31 January against Wolverhampton Wanderers in a 2–2 draw. Clough won the penalty that gave Icelandic striker Eiður Guðjohnsen the opportunity to score the opening goal in a 2–1 loss at home to Liverpool in an FA Cup fourth round replay, after the match Fabrice Muamba described him as the best player on the pitch. On 28 February 2015, Clough scored a sixth goal in nine games in a match against Brighton to make him Bolton's leading scorer for the 2014–15 season. However, in a league match, at home to Reading, he was one of three Bolton players to go off injured in the first half; his injury, a dislocated shoulder, prevented him playing for the remainder of the season. Neil Lennon admitted the loss of Clough for the rest of the season was a huge blow for the club. His efforts of his first season saw him nominated for the MBNA Northwest Football Awards' 2015 Mob Sport Rising Star of the Year award and 10 months after signing his first contract extension on 19 October 2015, Clough signed another contract tying him to the club until the summer of 2019.

A month into the 2015–16 season, Clough dislocated his other shoulder and ruled him out for 3 months. In January 2016, a number of clubs including Everton and Bristol City were interested in signing Clough. Bristol City had a £2,000,000 bid accepted however, Clough said that he wished to stay at Bolton so turned down his contract offer. Rumours circulated again in August 2016, clubs including Middlesbrough and Fulham were interested in signing Clough.

After scoring five goals in October 2016, Zach Clough was named League One player of the month. Of those five goals, two of them came against local team Bury FC in a 2–0 away win.

=== Nottingham Forest ===
On 30 January 2017, Clough transferred to Nottingham Forest on a four-and-a-half-year deal for an undisclosed fee, reported by the Nottingham Post to be £3,000,000. Clough made his debut for Forest on 4 February, starting a 2–1 victory over Aston Villa. His first goals for the club came in a 3–0 victory over eventual runners-up Brighton, albeit with Brighton's players claiming that Clough's opener came off the head of Britt Assombalonga, who had been stood in an offside position. On 18 March, Clough opened the scoring in the local derby match with fierce rivals Derby County, in an eventual 2–2 draw between the sides. Clough left the club 3 years after his last appearance when his contract was mutually terminated. He stated in an interview that "It was nothing to do with football, it was probably more finances." as the reason he did not make an appearance in 3 years for the club.

==== Return to Bolton Wanderers (loan) ====
On transfer deadline day on 31 January 2018, Clough returned to Bolton Wanderers on loan until the end of the season, joined by Nottingham Forest teammate Tyler Walker; Clough replaced Walker after 58 minutes in their 1–0 victory over Bristol City to make his second Bolton début. He scored his first goal on returning to Bolton Wanderers against Sunderland in a 1–0 win on 20 February 2018.

==== Rochdale (loan) ====
On loan deadline day on 31 August 2018, Clough signed on loan for Rochdale until January 2019. He scored on his debut for Rochdale in a 2–1 EFL Trophy win over Bury on 4 September 2018. On 31 January 2019, Clough rejoined Rochdale on loan for the rest of the 2018–19 season. Clough said that during his loan at Rochdale, he picked up a lot of injuries which prevented him from playing as much as he had liked to.

=== Wigan Athletic ===
On 22 January 2021, Clough joined League One side Wigan Athletic on a short-term deal until the end of the 2020–21 season. Clough made his Wigan debut against Fleetwood Town in a 0–0 draw at the DW Stadium. He went on to score his first goal for the club on the final day of the 2020–21 season in a 4–3 home defeat to Swindon Town. On 26 May it was announced he would be released when his contract ends after 13 appearances for the club. After leaving Wigan, Clough said "I didn't start that many (games) because of probably fitness and sharpness that I bought at that time, I needed to just get back out there. I really did enjoy it" about his time at the club.

=== Carlisle United ===
On 22 June 2021, Clough joined League Two side Carlisle United on a two-year deal following his release by Wigan. He previously worked with Carlisle manager Chris Beech whilst on loan at Rochdale AFC. Clough scored his first goal for the club in a 2–1 away loss to Hartlepool United. Clough made 23 appearances in all competitions for Carlisle before it was announced on 31 January 2022, that he left Carlisle on a free transfer in order to join an overseas club. It was not announced what country or club Clough would be joining.

=== Adelaide United ===
On 5 February 2022, it was announced that Clough had signed for A-League Men side Adelaide United on a contract until the end of the season. He made his debut for the club in a 1–1 draw away to Wellington Phoenix FC on 12 February 2022. Clough scored his first goal for Adelaide in the dramatic semi-final second leg tie against A-League Men side Melbourne City. This 48th-minute dink put Adelaide in front at AAMI Park, before City equalised in the 74th to take the game to extra-time.

On June 6 2022, it was announced that Clough signed a new two-year contract, keeping him at the club until the end of the 2023–24 season. At the start of the 2022–23 season, Zach switched from the number 20 shirt to the number 10, vacated by Isaías Sánchez who also switched shirt numbers. He went on to play the first game of the A-League Men season against Wellington Phoenix, but then missed the next 7 A-League Men games due to a thigh injury. Zach scored his second goal of the 2022–23 season but his first at Coopers Stadium on 20 January 2023 against Macarthur FC after previously scoring his first goal in the Australia Cup in August. He missed another 3 games at the end of the season including the play off game with Wellington Phoenix due to a calf injury. But managed to regain his fitness to play the semi-final two legs against Central Coast Mariners.

Clough started the 2023–24 season by scoring at least one goal or having one assist in eight consecutive games – a record for Adelaide United. That tally includes four goals and three assists in the A-League and two goals in two Australia Cup games. On 6 December 2023, Clough signed a two-year contract extension that will see him remain with the club until at least the end of the 2025–26 Isuzu UTE A-League season. He ended the 2023–24 season playing 28 games in all competitions, scoring 10 goals. Only missing 1 game due to the birth of his first child. He was awarded the Aurelio Vidmar Medal (Player of the Year) at the Adelaide United awards. On 16 July 2025, Clough left the club take up an opportunity overseas.

=== Selangor ===
On 22 July 2025, Clough joined Malaysia Super League side Selangor for an undisclosed fee.

=== Newcastle Jets ===
On 14 January 2026, Clough returned to Australia — signing for Newcastle Jets. They finished the season as Champions.

== Career statistics ==
As of match played 16 May 2026

Appearances and goals by club, season and competition
Club	Season	League			National cup (Note: Includes FA Cup, Australia Cup, Malaysia FA Cup)		League cup (Note: Includes EFL Cup, Malaysia Cup)		Continental		Other		Total	
Club	Season	Division	Apps	Goals	Apps	Goals	Apps	Goals	Apps	Goals	Apps	Goals	Apps	Goals
Bolton Wanderers	2014–15	Championship	8	5	2	1	0	0	—		—		10	6
Bolton Wanderers	2015–16	Championship	28	7	0	0	1	0	—		—		29	7
Bolton Wanderers	2016–17	League One	23	9	4	0	0	0	—		2 (Note: Appearances in EFL Trophy)	0	29	9
Bolton Wanderers	Total		59	21	6	1	1	0	0	0	2	0	68	22
Nottingham Forest	2016–17	Championship	14	4	—		—		—		—		14	4
Nottingham Forest	2017–18	Championship	13	0	2	0	2	0	—		—		17	0
Nottingham Forest	2018–19	Championship	0	0	—		—		—		—		0	0
Nottingham Forest	2019–20	Championship	0	0	—		—		—		—		0	0
Nottingham Forest	2020–21	Championship	0	0	—		—		—		—		0	0
Nottingham Forest	Total		27	4	2	0	2	0	0	0	0	0	31	4
Bolton Wanderers (loan)	2017–18	Championship	9	1	—		—		—		—		9	1
Rochdale (loan)	2018–19	League One	9	0	1	0	—		—		3	1	13	1
Wigan Athletic	2020–21	League One	13	1	0	0	0	0	—		0	0	13	1
Carlisle United	2021–22	League Two	17	2	2	1	0	0	—		4	0	23	3
Adelaide United	2021–22	A-League	11	0	—		—		—		2 (Note: Appearances in the A-League play-offs)	1	13	1
Adelaide United	2022–23	A-League	17	3	2	1	—		—		2	0	21	4
Adelaide United	2023–24	A-League	26	8	2	2	—		—		0	0	28	10
Adelaide United	2024–25	A-League	26	7	4	0	—		—		1	0	31	7
Adelaide United	Total		80	18	8	3	0	0	0	0	5	1	93	22
Selangor	2025–26	Super League	7	0	3	2	0	0	5 (Note: Appearances in AFC Champions League Two)	0	3 (Note: 2 Appearance in ASEAN Club Championship and 1 Appearance in the Piala Sumbangsih)	1	18	3
Newcastle Jets	2025–26	A-League	4	0	—		—		—		2	0	6	0
Newcastle Jets	2026–27	A-League	0	0	1	0	—		0	0	0	0	1	0
Newcastle Jets	Total		4	0	1	0	0	0	0	0	2	0	7	0
Career total			225	47	23	7	3	0	5	0	19	3	275	57

== Honours ==
Bolton Wanderers

- EFL League One second-place promotion: 2016–17

Newcastle Jets

- A-League: 2025–26

Individual

- Football League One Player of the Month: October 2016
- Adelaide United Aurelio Vidmar Medalist (Player of the Year) 2023–24
