= Nick Ansell =

Australian professional soccer player

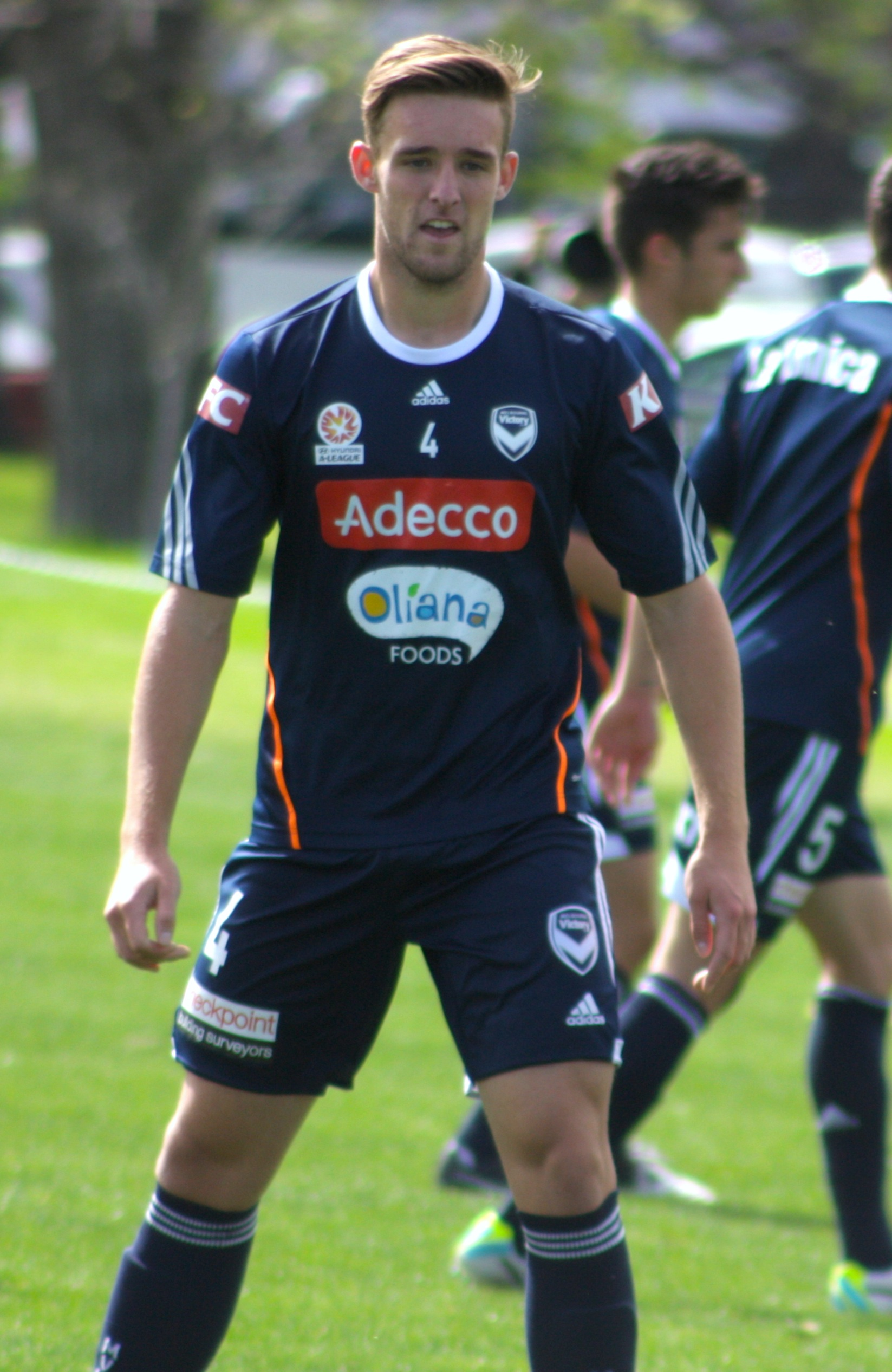
- Ansell with Melbourne Victory in 2013.

Personal information
- Full name: Nicolas Clive Ansell
- Date of birth: 2 February 1994 (age 32)
- Place of birth: Melbourne, Victoria, Australia
- Height: 1.86 m (6 ft 1 in)
- Position: Central defender

Team information
- Current team: Nakhon Ratchasima
- Number: 29

Youth career
- 2009: VIS
- 2010–2012: Melbourne Victory

Senior career*
| Years | Team | Apps | (Gls) |
| 2012–2017 | Melbourne Victory | 71 | (1) |
| 2011 | → FFV NTC (loan) | 9 | (0) |
| 2012 | → Bentleigh Greens (loan) | 20 | (0) |
| 2017–2018 | Tondela | 8 | (0) |
| 2018–2019 | Melbourne Victory | 7 | (0) |
| 2019 | Jeonnam Dragons | 15 | (0) |
| 2020 | Gyeongnam | 5 | (0) |
| 2020–2021 | Melbourne Victory | 14 | (0) |
| 2021–2024 | Adelaide United | 28 | (1) |
| 2024–2025 | Nakhon Ratchasima | 23 | (0) |

International career^{‡}
| 2010 | Australia U17 | 1 | (0) |
| 2011 | Australia U20 | 1 | (0) |
| 2014 | Australia U23 | 2 | (0) |
- * Club domestic league appearances and goals as of 15 June 2025 ‡ National team caps and goals as of 20 June 2017

Nicolas Clive Ansell (born 2 February 1994) is an Australian professional soccer player who last played as a centre back for Nakhon Ratchasima in the Thai League 1.

Since August 2025, he has served as the junior Technical Director of State League Division 2 South-East side Doncaster Rovers SC.

== Early and personal life ==
Ansell was born on 2 February 1994 in Melbourne to Warren and Andree Ansell. His mother was a former ballet dancer. Raised in Doncaster East, Victoria Ansell grew up in an Australian rules football family. He piqued interest in both Aussie rules and soccer growing up, playing until he was 12 when he decided to focus on soccer after receiving too many injuries from football. He began playing soccer with Doncaster Rovers, Box Hill United, and Bulleen Lions before joining the Victorian Institute of Sport (VIS). Despite choosing soccer, Ansell claimed in an interview to have excelled in football, winning numerous awards including the best-and-fairest league award.

Ansell attended Carey Baptist Grammar School where he played futsal and football. He is close friends with Jack Viney, Kristian Jaksch, Jason Ashby, Nathan Hrovat and Jackson Macrae, all of whom became professional football players. Ansell has been married to Nadene since July 2022. The couple was engaged in November 2020. Their wedding was held in South Melbourne where over 150 guests were present. Numerous professional soccer players also attended the ceremony, including former football player and close friend Kristian Jaksch. Outside of soccer, Ansell studied property development and real estate at Deakin University.

== Club career ==
Ansell spent several years in the Melbourne Victory youth squad before a breakout 2012–13 season, which saw him rewarded with a senior A-League contract. Considered an upcoming future star, he made an immediate impact as a commanding centre back, playing a key role in Melbourne Victory's 2014/15 Premiership-Championship double.

Ansell left the Victory on 12 May 2017.

In June 2017, Ansell signed with Portuguese Primeira Liga side Tondela.

In July 2018, Ansell returned to Melbourne to re-join Melbourne Victory.

On 31 January 2019, Ansell departed the Victory a second time, joining K League 2 team Jeonnam Dragons

In October 2020, Ansell returned to Melbourne Victory for a third time. He was released on 11 June 2021.

In July 2021, Ansell joined Adelaide United for the 2021–22 A-League season.

In May 2024, he was released from Adelaide United after his contract expired.

== Coaching career ==
On August 10, 2025, Ansell was announced as the new junior Technical Director of Doncaster Rovers, who play in State League Division 2 South-East.

== Career statistics ==
As of 16 March 2025

Appearances and goals by club, season and competition
| Club | Season | League | | | National cup (Note: Includes FFA/Australia Cup, Taça de Portugal, Korean FA Cup, and Thai FA Cup) | | League cup (Note: Includes Taça da Liga and Thai League Cup) | | Continental | | Total | |
| Club | Season | Division | Apps | Goals | Apps | Goals | Apps | Goals | Apps | Goals | Apps | Goals |
|---|---|---|---|---|---|---|---|---|---|---|---|---|
| FFV NTC | 2011 | Victorian Premier League | 9 | 0 | — | | — | | — | | 9 | 0 |
| Bentleigh Greens | 2012 | Victorian Premier League | 15 | 0 | — | | — | | — | | 15 | 0 |
| Melbourne Victory | 2012–13 | A-League | 8 | 0 | — | | — | | — | | 8 | 0 |
| Melbourne Victory | 2013–14 | A-League | 14 | 0 | — | | — | | 4 | 1 | 18 | 1 |
| Melbourne Victory | 2014–15 | A-League | 22 | 1 | 0 | 0 | — | | — | | 22 | 1 |
| Melbourne Victory | 2015–16 | A-League | 8 | 0 | 0 | 0 | — | | 7 | 1 | 15 | 1 |
| Melbourne Victory | 2016–17 | A-League | 19 | 0 | 4 | 0 | — | | — | | 23 | 0 |
| Melbourne Victory | Total | | 71 | 1 | 4 | 0 | 0 | 0 | 11 | 2 | 86 | 3 |
| Tondela | 2017–18 | Primeira Liga | 8 | 0 | 1 | 0 | 1 | 0 | — | | 10 | 0 |
| Melbourne Victory | 2018–19 | A-League | 7 | 0 | 1 | 0 | — | | 0 | 0 | 8 | 0 |
| Jeonnam Dragons | 2019 | K League 2 | 15 | 0 | 0 | 0 | — | | — | | 15 | 0 |
| Gyeongnam | 2020 | K League 2 | 5 | 0 | 1 | 0 | — | | — | | 6 | 0 |
| Melbourne Victory | 2020–21 | A-League Men | 14 | 0 | — | | — | | 5 | 0 | 19 | 0 |
| Adelaide United | 2021–22 | A-League Men | 2 | 0 | 1 | 0 | — | | — | | 3 | 0 |
| Adelaide United | 2022–23 | A-League Men | 7 | 0 | 0 | 0 | — | | — | | 7 | 0 |
| Adelaide United | 2023–24 | A-League Men | 19 | 1 | 0 | 0 | — | | — | | 19 | 1 |
| Adelaide United | Total | | 28 | 1 | 1 | 0 | 0 | 0 | 0 | 0 | 29 | 1 |
| Nakhon Ratchasima | 2024–25 | Thai League 1 | 22 | 0 | 0 | 0 | 1 | 0 | — | | 23 | 0 |
| Career total | | | 194 | 2 | 8 | 0 | 2 | 0 | 16 | 2 | 219 | 4 |

== Honours ==
Melbourne Victory

- A-League Championship: 2014–15
- A-League Premiership: 2014–15
