= Ben Halloran =

Australian association football player (born 1992)

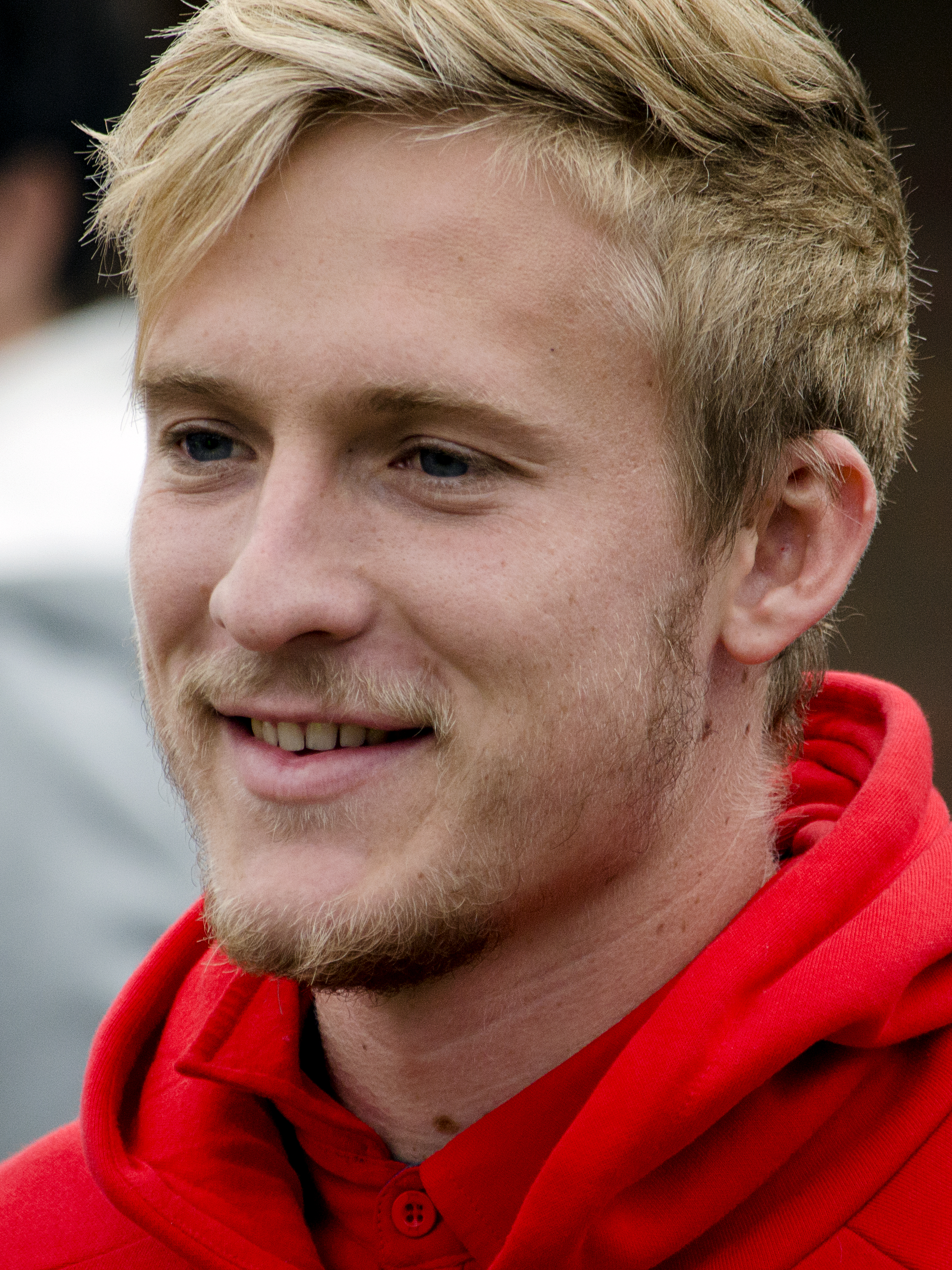
- Halloran with Fortuna Düsseldorf in 2014

Personal information
- Full name: Benjamin Halloran
- Date of birth: 14 June 1992 (age 34)
- Place of birth: Cairns, Queensland, Australia
- Height: 1.80 m (5 ft 11 in)
- Positions: Winger; second striker

Youth career
- Edge Hill
- Wynnum Wolves
- 2009: QAS
- 2009–2010: Gold Coast United

Senior career*
Years	Team	Apps	(Gls)
2010–2012	Gold Coast United	26	(4)
2012–2013	Brisbane Roar	27	(4)
2013–2015	Fortuna Düsseldorf	37	(8)
2013–2015	Fortuna Düsseldorf II	6	(1)
2015–2018	1. FC Heidenheim	50	(5)
2018	V-Varen Nagasaki	5	(0)
2018–2022	Adelaide United	77	(17)
2022	FC Seoul	2	(0)
2022–2024	Adelaide United	49	(7)
2024–2026	Brisbane Roar	28	(2)

International career^{‡}
2010	Australia U-20	6	(1)
2014	Australia	6	(0)
- * Club domestic league appearances and goals as of 9 May 2026 ‡ National team caps and goals as of 5 September 2014

Benjamin Halloran (/ˈhæl.ə.rən/ born 14 June 1992) is an Australian soccer player who most recently played as a winger for Brisbane Roar in the A-League, Australia's top division for association football. He has previously represented Australia, including an appearance in the 2014 World Cup. Halloran has played club football in three continents.

== Club career ==
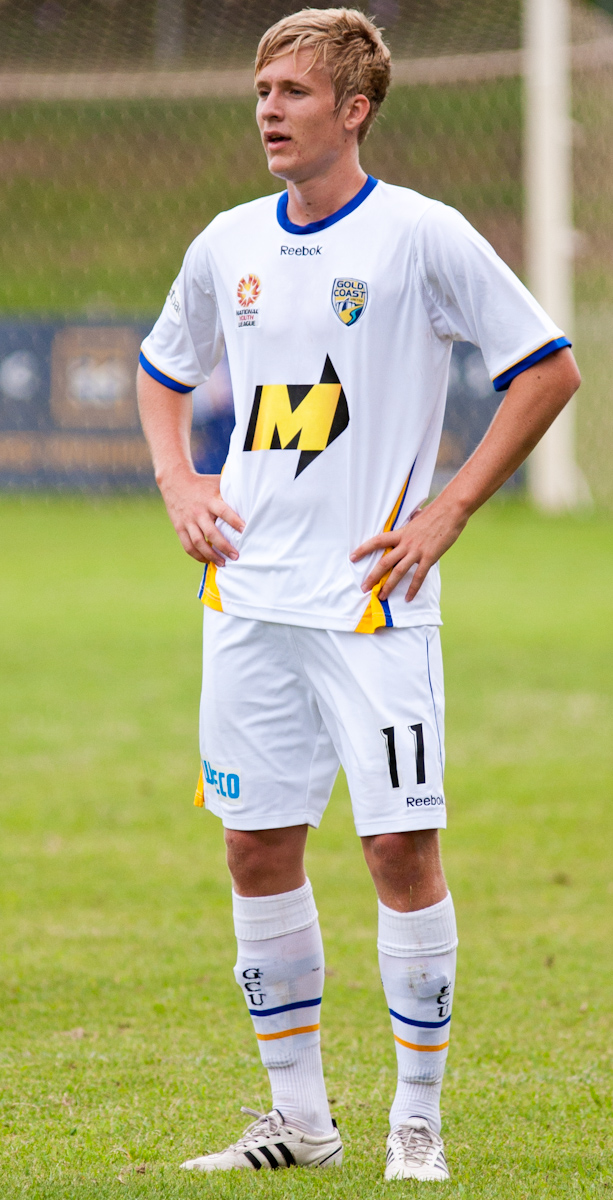
Halloran with Gold Coast United in 2010.

=== Gold Coast United ===
Halloran made his debut for Gold Coast United as a substitute in their Round 4, 1–0 loss to Melbourne Victory in the 2010–11 season.

On 6 January 2011, Gold Coast United coach Miron Bleiberg addressed the speculation that the talented player may leave the club however Bleiberg was adamant that the player was contracted for another two years and unless a sizable transfer offer was made the player would remain at Gold Coast.

In the 2010–11 A-League season, Halloran started two games and came on as substitute twice. The next season Halloran established himself as a future Socceroos player. He had a stand out season for Gold Coast. He played 17 games and scored four goals. Halloran had a great game against Adelaide United, where he scored one goal and received the match ball for a best on ground performance.

=== Brisbane Roar ===
Following the demise of Gold Coast United at the end of the 2011–12 season, Halloran attracted a lot of interest from Melbourne Victory, Brisbane Roar and "at least three other A-League clubs" for his services for the 2012–13 season. On 13 May 2012, it was announced that Brisbane had signed Halloran on a three-year deal with the 2011–12 Champions. In Halloran 's seventh match for the roar he would score his first goal against Sydney FC. Halloran would have a quieter year than the one before but played more matches.

Halloran started 18 matches but was forced to come on as the substitute 10 times. Halloran scored four goals in his time at Roar including the winning goal in the 83rd minute against Adelaide United. After the match his Manager, Mike Mulvey said "Ben needs to be more of a team player", which Halloran understood.

=== Fortuna Düsseldorf ===
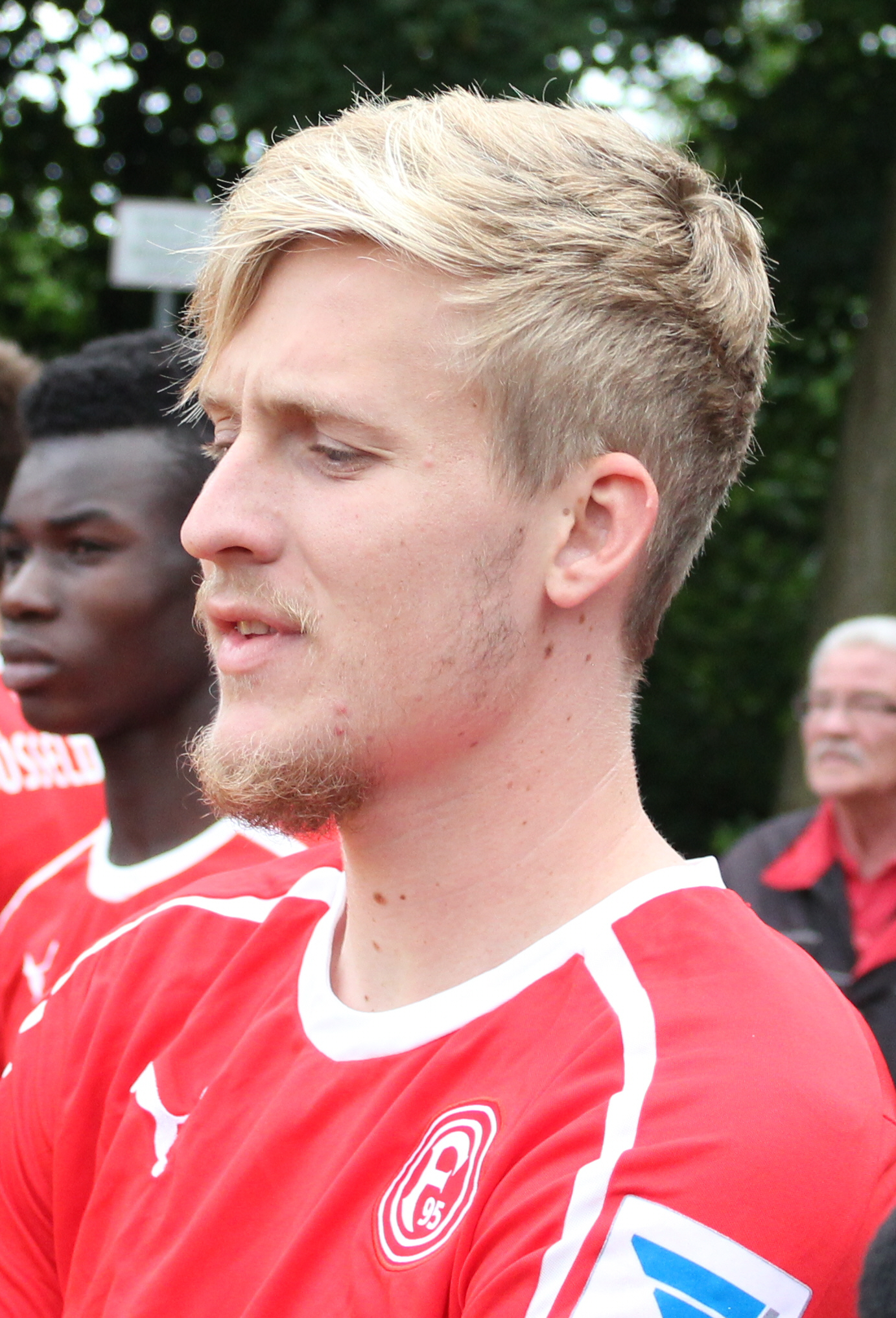
Halloran with Fortuna Düsseldorf in 2013.

On 22 May 2013, It was announced that Halloran had requested a move to Fortuna Düsseldorf (German 2. Bundesliga), a request that was approved by Brisbane Roar. The transfer amount was said to be around $400,000. On 7 October 2013, Halloran made his debut for Fortuna Düsseldorf against Greuther Fürth. Ben would play the entire match on the right wing in the 2–1 win. Halloran scored his first goal for Düsseldorf's first team in his sixth appearance, and in the 70th minute, with the goal equalizing the score and snatching a point for his team.

=== 1. FC Heidenheim ===
On 23 June 2015, it was confirmed that Halloran had left Düsseldorf for fellow 2. Bundesliga side, 1. FC Heidenheim on a 3-year deal.

On 26 July 2015, Halloran made his debut as a substitute against 1860 Munich in a 1–0 win.

=== V-Varen Nagasaki ===
In January 2018, Halloran ended his spell in Europe and signed for V-Varen Nagasaki. After making five appearances for the club, Halloran left the club in on 3 July 2018.

=== Adelaide United ===
On 14 August 2018, Halloran returned to the A-League signing a two-year deal for Adelaide United. In his first season at the club, Halloran scored the winning goal in the elimination final against Melbourne City in the 119th minute, sending the Reds through. In his second season at the club, Halloran scored 9 goals in the league, and 3 goals in the cup. In what was prolific season for Halloran, he had a lot of interest from rival clubs, however, despite interest, Halloran signed a two-year contract extension on 4 March 2020.

=== FC Seoul ===
On 10 January 2022, FC Seoul announced that Ben Halloran had a signed for an undisclosed fee on a two-year contract until 2023.

On 23 June 2022, FC Seoul announced that Halloran's contract was officially terminated by mutual consent.

=== Return to Adelaide United ===
After only two appearances for FC Seoul, Halloran returned to Adelaide United in 2022, on a two-year deal.

After a disappointing 2023–24 season in which the club failed to qualify for the A-League finals, Halloran's contract expired and was released by Adelaide United after scoring 7 goals in 49 league appearances. He was one of many in a mass exodus for the club, which included fellow Socceroos Nestory Irankunda and Joe Gauci.

=== Return to Brisbane Roar ===
In June 2024, it was announced that Halloran would return to Brisbane Roar prior to the 2024/25 season.

== International career ==
Halloran made six appearances for Australia's U-20 side scoring one goal. He was selected in the squad for Australia's 2013 EAFF East Asian Cup Qualifiers, but was not picked for the team.

Halloran was selected in Australia's provisional 30 man squad for the 2014 FIFA World Cup. He made his international debut in a pre World Cup friendly match against South Africa on 26 May 2014. He made his World Cup debut on 13 June 2014, coming in as a substitute as Australia lost 1–3 to Chile.

== Career statistics ==
As of 31 January 2024

Appearances and goals by club, season and competition
Club	Season	League			National Cup		Other		Total	
Club	Season	Division	Apps	Goals	Apps	Goals	Apps	Goals	Apps	Goals
Gold Coast United	2010–11	A-League	5	0	—		—		5	0
Gold Coast United	2011–12	A-League	21	4	—		—		21	4
Gold Coast United	Total		26	4	—		0	0	26	4
Brisbane Roar	2012–13	A-League	28	4	—		1 (Note: Appearance in the Asian Champions League)	0	29	4
Fortuna Düsseldorf	2013–14	2. Bundesliga	18	6	0	0	—		18	6
Fortuna Düsseldorf	2013–14	Regionalliga West (Note: Competed for Fortuna Düsseldorf II)	6	1	—		—		6	1
Fortuna Düsseldorf	2014–15	2. Bundesliga	19	2	0	0	—		19	2
Fortuna Düsseldorf	Total		43	9	0	0	0	0	43	9
Heidenheim	2015–16	2. Bundesliga	22	2	4	1	—		26	3
Heidenheim	2016–17	2. Bundesliga	19	2	1	0	—		20	2
Heidenheim	2017–18	2. Bundesliga	9	1	1	0	—		10	1
Heidenheim	Total		50	5	6	1	0	0	56	6
V-Varen Nagasaki	2018	J1 League	5	0	5	0	0	0	10	0
Adelaide United	2018–19	A-League Men	23	3	4	1	0	0	27	4
Adelaide United	2019–20	A-League Men	21	9	5	3	0	0	26	12
Adelaide United	2020–21	A-League Men	28	4	0	0	0	0	28	4
Adelaide United	2021–22	A-League Men	5	1	2	0	0	0	7	1
Adelaide United	Total		77	17	11	4	0	0	88	21
FC Seoul	2022	K League 1	2	0	0	0	0	0	2	0
Adelaide United	2022–23	A-League Men	27	3	2	0	0	0	29	3
Adelaide United	2023–24	A-League Men	22	4	2	0	0	0	16	4
Adelaide United	Total		49	7	4	0	0	0	45	7
Career total			280	46	26	5	1	0	307	51

== Honours ==
Gold Coast United

- National Youth League Championship: 2009–10

Adelaide United

- FFA Cup: 2018, 2019

Australia

- AFF U-19 Youth Championship: 2010
