= Panashe Madanha =

Australian soccer player (born 2004)

Personal information
- Full name: Panashe Peter Madanha
- Date of birth: 5 August 2004 (age 22)
- Place of birth: Harare, Zimbabwe
- Height: 1.85 m (6 ft 1 in)
- Position: Right back

Team information
- Current team: Western Sydney Wanderers
- Number: 36

Youth career
- –2014: Adelaide Olympic
- 2015–2016: FK Beograd
- 2017–2019: SA NTC
- 2020–2021: Adelaide United

Senior career*
Years	Team	Apps	(Gls)
2021–2026	Adelaide United NPL	57	(10)
2022–2026	Adelaide United	35	(0)
2026–	Western Sydney Wanderers	0	(0)

International career^{‡}
2023	Australia U20	4	(0)
- * Club domestic league appearances and goals as of 11 January 2025 ‡ National team caps and goals as of 11 March 2023

Panashe Peter Madanha (Shona: [pàˈnáʃe màˈdáŋà]; born 5 August 2004) is a professional footballer who plays as a right back for Western Sydney Wanderers. Born in Zimbabwe, he represents Australia at youth level. He is the first Zimbabwe-born player to feature in the A-League.

== Early and personal life ==
Panashe Madanha was born on 5 August 2004 in Harare, Zimbabwe. At the age of four, his family relocated to Adelaide, Australia, following a job opportunity for his father and subsequent employment for his mother as a nurse. Growing up in Adelaide, Madanha enjoyed playing football during the winter months and cricket during the Australian summer and actively participated in athletics. He started playing football at the age of seven, eventually signing for Adelaide United's youth side. Encouraged by his parents, Madanha studied Human Movement and Physiotherapy.

== Club career ==
=== Adelaide United ===
Madanha signed his first professional contract on 5 July 2022, a two-year scholarship deal, following his form with Adelaide United Youth at NPL level after scoring 6 goals in 17 appearances. He soon made his professional debut in an Australia Cup Round of 32 match against Newcastle Jets on 30 July 2022. In the league season, on 27 December, Madanha made his A-League Men debut, coming off the bench in the 89th minute, in United's second match-up against Newcastle. His debut made him the first Zimbabwe-born player to feature in the A-League.

Madanha made his first league start, after making an extra substitute appearance following his debut, in a 2–0 win over Perth Glory on 2 January 2023. His strong performance as a temporary replacement for defender Javi López, received praise by manager Carl Veart. In the subsequent match and in his second starting appearance, Madanha scored an own goal in United's 4–0 lost to Central Coast Mariners, followed by his third starting appearance against Melbourne Victory as a right-back for United. Madanha extended his contract with Adelaide on 5 October 2023, prior to the 2023–24 A-League season, re-signing until the end of the 2025–26 season.

Following the conclusion of his contract, Madanha departed Adelaide United on 27 May 2026.

== International career ==
Born in Zimbabwe and having spent a significant portion of his childhood in Australia, Madanha holds eligibility to represent either Zimbabwe or Australia on the international stage.

In February 2023, Madanha received his first international call-up after being selected to represent the Australia U20 squad for the AFC U-20 Asian Cup. He would join alongside other South Australian youngsters, such as Bernardo Oliveira, Jonny Yull, and Raphael Borges Rodrigues.

== Style of play ==
On the field, Madanha frequently uses his solid frame and impressive pace, which consistently troubles opposing defenders. As a pacy winger, he utilises his physical attributes to his advantage, creating difficulties for the opposition's backline and posing a constant threat with his speed and power.

Under Carl Veart's system, Madanha was deployed as a right-back instead of his natural position as a winger. Despite this, he was able to showcase his ability to contribute positively in different areas of the pitch whilst adding to his energetic and forward-minded runs to further contribute to his team's success, making him a very versatile player to Adelaide United's gameplay.
