= Hiroshi Ibusuki =

Japanese football (born 1991)

Personal information
- Full name: Hiroshi Ibusuki
- Date of birth: 27 February 1991 (age 35)
- Place of birth: Nagareyama, Japan
- Height: 1.95 m (6 ft 5 in)
- Position: Striker

Team information
- Current team: Western Sydney Wanderers
- Number: 9

Youth career
- 2000–2008: Kashiwa Reysol

Senior career*
Years	Team	Apps	(Gls)
2009–2011	Girona	6	(0)
2009–2010	→ Zaragoza B (loan)	27	(12)
2010–2011	→ Sabadell (loan)	34	(10)
2011–2013	Sevilla B	32	(20)
2012–2013	Sevilla	1	(0)
2012–2013	→ Eupen (loan)	26	(10)
2013–2014	Valencia B	33	(7)
2014–2017	Albirex Niigata	67	(12)
2017–2018	JEF United Chiba	62	(12)
2019–2020	Shonan Bellmare	34	(3)
2021–2022	Shimizu S-Pulse	14	(0)
2022–2024	Adelaide United	71	(28)
2024–2025	Western United	25	(10)
2025–2026	East Bengal	6	(1)
2026–	Western Sydney Wanderers	8	(1)

International career
2010	Japan U19	5	(4)
2011	Japan U22	2	(0)
- * Club domestic league appearances and goals as of 28 April 2026

Hiroshi Ibusuki (指宿 洋史, Ibusuki Hiroshi; born 27 February 1991) is a Japanese professional footballer who plays as a striker for A-League Men club Western Sydney Wanderers.

== Club career ==
Born in Nagareyama, Chiba, Ibusuki played all his youth football with Kashiwa Reysol. On 2 January 2009, aged not yet 18, he signed a four-year contract with Spanish club Girona. He made his Segunda División debut on 19 April, playing ten minutes in a 0–3 away loss to Hércules CF at the Estadio José Rico Pérez.

Ibusuki spent the following two seasons on loan, with Real Zaragoza B (Tercera División) and CE Sabadell (Segunda División B), and made his debut for the latter side in a 0–0 draw against UE Lleida, again as a substitute. He would, however, be a major contributor to the Catalans' promotion to the second level, starting in 26 of the games he appeared in and scoring ten goals, best in the squad.

In summer 2011, Ibusuki joined Sevilla FC of La Liga, but spent the vast majority of his first season with their reserves in the third tier. On 21 January 2012 he made his first-team debut, coming on for Álvaro Negredo in the 83rd minute of a 1–1 away derby draw against Real Betis.

Subsequently, Ibusuki represented K.A.S. Eupen and Valencia CF Mestalla. In 2014 he returned to his homeland, first with Albirex Niigata then JEF United Chiba.

In January 2022, Ibusuki signed for A-League Men club Adelaide United. He scored his first goal on debut for the club on 15 January 2022, a day after he signed for the club.

Following the suspension of Western United's participation ahead of the 2025–26 season, all players – including Ibusuki – were released from their contracts in September 2025.

On 17 September 2025, Ibusuki moved to India by signing for Indian Super League side East Bengal on a free transfer. On 16 January 2026, East Bengal announced they had mutually agreed to part ways with Ibusuki.

On 16 January 2026, Ibusuki returned to Australia when he signed for A-League side Western Sydney Wanderers FC. The deal lasts until the end of the 2026/27 season.

== International career ==
On 17 September 2010, Sabadell announced that Ibusuki had been selected to play for the Japanese under-19 team.

== Club statistics ==
As of 2 July 2023

Club	Season	League			Cup^{1}		Other^{2}		Total	
Club	Season	Division	Apps	Goals	Apps	Goals	Apps	Goals	Apps	Goals
Girona	2008–09	Segunda División	6	0	-		-		6	0
Girona	Girona Total		6	0	-		-		6	0
Zaragoza B	2009–10	Tercera División	27	12	-		-		27	12
Zaragoza B	Zaragoza B Total		27	12	-		-		27	12
Sabadell	2010–11	Segunda División B	33	10	1	1	2	0	36	11
Sabadell	Sabadell Total		33	10	1	1	2	0	36	11
Sevilla B	2011–12	Segunda División B	32	20					32	20
Sevilla B	Sevilla B Total		32	20					32	20
Sevilla	2011–12	La Liga	1	0					1	0
Sevilla	Sevilla Total		1	0					1	0
Eupen	2012–13	Belgian First Division B	26	10	0	0	-		26	10
Eupen	Eupen Total		26	10	0	0	-		26	10
Valencia B	2013–14	Segunda División B	35	7	0	0	0	0	35	7
Valencia B	Valencia B Total		35	7	0	0	0	0	35	7
Albirex Niigata	2014	J1 League	15	3	0	0	0	0	15	3
Albirex Niigata	2015	J1 League	31	8	9	4	0	0	40	12
Albirex Niigata	2016	J1 League	21	1	1	1	0	0	22	2
Albirex Niigata	Albirex Niigata Total		67	12	10	5	0	0	77	17
JEF United	2017	J2 League	29	3	2	0	1	0	32	3
JEF United	2018	J2 League	33	9	2	2	-		35	11
JEF United	JEF United Total		62	12	4	2	1	0	67	14
Shonan Bellmare	2019	J1 League	14	1	2	1	0	0	16	2
Shonan Bellmare	2020	J1 League	20	2	1	0	-		21	2
Shonan Bellmare	Shonan Bellmare Total		34	3	3	1	0	0	37	4
Shimizu S-Pulse	2021	J1 League	14	0	5	1	3	1	22	2
Shimizu S-Pulse	Shimizu S-Pulse Total		14	0	5	1	3	1	22	2
Adelaide United	2021–22	A-League Men	21	6	0	0	-		21	6
Adelaide United	2022–23	A-League Men	24	7	3	2	0	0	27	9
Adelaide United	2023-24	A-League Men	26	15	-	-	-	-	26	15
Adelaide United	Adelaide United Total		74	28	3	2	0	0	74	30
Western United	2024-25	A-League Men	27	10	-	-	-	-	27	10
Career total			382	99	26	12	6	1	414	145

^{1}Includes Copa Federación de España. and Australia Cup

^{2}Includes Segunda División Playoffs, J2 Playoffs and Emperor's Cup.
