= Steven Hall (soccer) =

Australian soccer player

Personal information
- Full name: Steven James Hall
- Date of birth: 16 January 2005 (age 21)
- Place of birth: Australia
- Height: 1.86 m (6 ft 1 in)
- Position: Goalkeeper

Team information
- Current team: Brighton & Hove Albion
- Number: 61

Youth career
- 2016–2018: Para Hills Knights
- 2019: Adelaide City
- 2019: SA NTC
- 2020–2024: Adelaide United
- 2024–: Brighton & Hove Albion

Senior career*
Years	Team	Apps	(Gls)
2021–2024	Adelaide United NPL	13	(0)
2022–2024	Adelaide United	3	(0)
2024–	Brighton & Hove Albion	0	(0)

International career^{‡}
2022–	Australia U20	14	(0)
2023–	Australia U23	5	(0)
Medal record
Men's football
Representing Australia
WAFF U-23 Championship
Runner-up	2024 Saudi Arabia
AFC U-20 Asian Cup
Winner	2025 China	Team
- * Club domestic league appearances and goals as of 26 January 2024 ‡ National team caps and goals as of 14 January 2026

Steven James Hall (born 16 January 2005) is an Australian professional footballer who plays as a goalkeeper for the academy of English Premier League club Brighton & Hove Albion.

== Club career ==
=== Adelaide United ===
Hall begun his senior career at Adelaide United in the A-League, and is the youngest goalkeeper in A-League history having made his debut at 16 years and 350 days. Hall signed a scholarship contract with the club 7 months later, as a 17 year old.

=== Brighton and Hove Albion ===
On 26 January 2024, Hall signed for the youth academy of Premier League club Brighton & Hove Albion on a three-and-a-half-year contract for an undisclosed fee.

== International career ==
Hall made the match-winning save in the penalty shootout of the 2025 U20 Asian Cup final, bringing Australia's their first ever title in the competition.

== Career statistics ==
As of match played 3 November 2026

Appearances and goals by club, season and competition
Club	Season	League			National Cup		League Cup		Continental		Other		Total	
Club	Season	Division	Apps	Goals	Apps	Goals	Apps	Goals	Apps	Goals	Apps	Goals	Apps	Goals
Adelaide United	2021–22	A-League Men	3	0	—		—		—		—		3	0
Brighton & Hove Albion	2025–26	Premier League	0	0	0	0	0	0	—		—		0	0
Brighton & Hove Albion U21s	2025–26	—									1 (Note: Appearances in the EFL Trophy)	0	1	0
Brighton & Hove Albion U21s	2026–27	—									3	0	3	0
Brighton & Hove Albion U21s	Total		—								4	0	4	0
Career total			3	0	0	0	0	0	0	0	4	0	7	0

== Honours ==
Australia U-23

- WAFF U-23 Championship: runner-up 2024

Australia U-20

- AFC U-20 Asian Cup: 2025
