= Javi López (footballer, born 1986) =

Spanish footballer

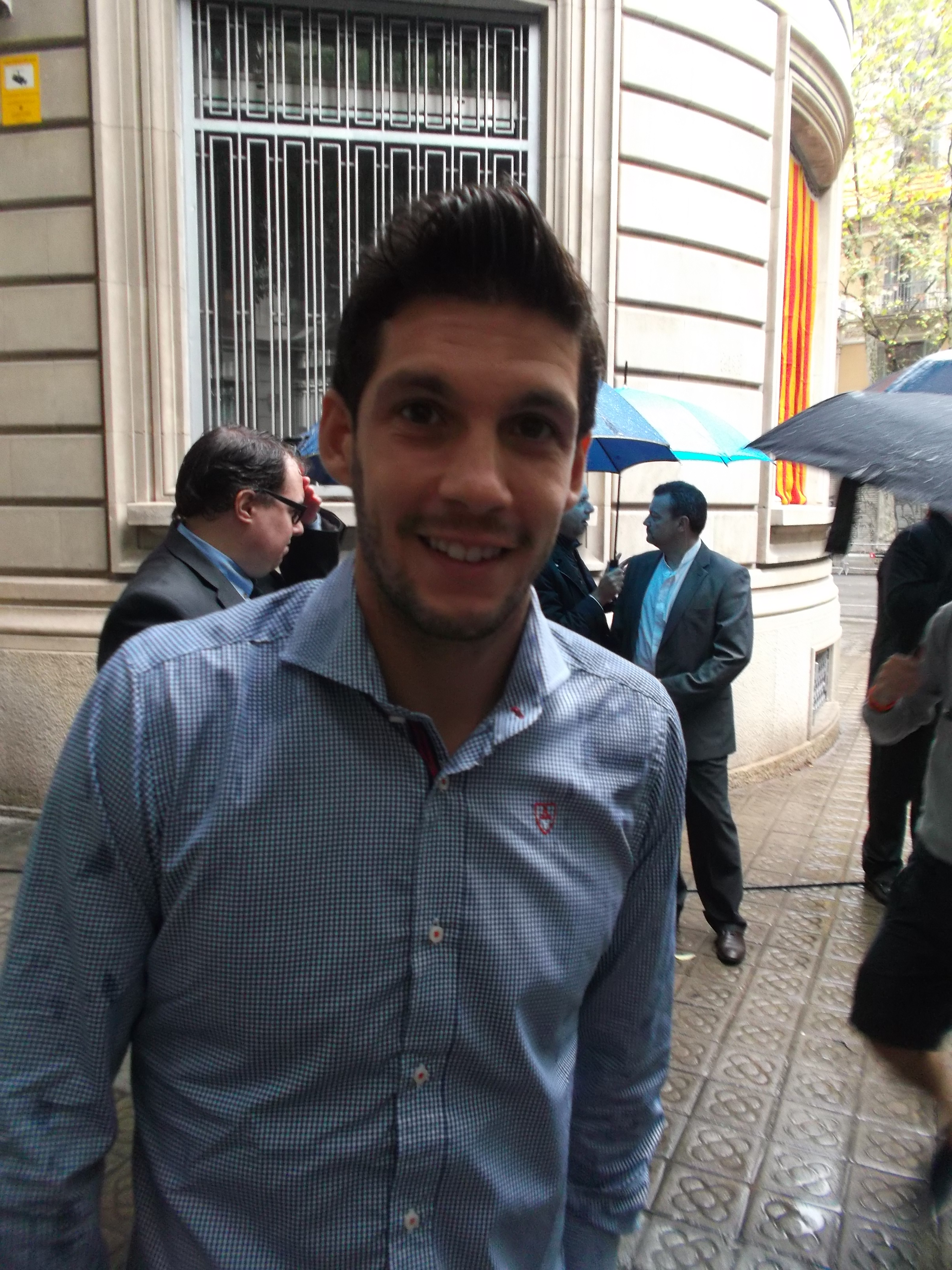
- López in 2013

Personal information
- Full name: Javier López Rodríguez
- Date of birth: 21 January 1986 (age 40)
- Place of birth: Osuna, Spain
- Height: 1.80 m (5 ft 11 in)
- Positions: Full-back; central midfielder

Youth career
- Betis

Senior career*
Years	Team	Apps	(Gls)
2005–2006	Betis C	15	(1)
2005–2007	Betis B	38	(4)
2007–2010	Espanyol B	75	(7)
2009–2020	Espanyol	252	(2)
2020–2025	Adelaide United	91	(4)
Total		471	(18)
- * Club domestic league appearances and goals

Javier 'Javi' López Rodríguez (Spanish pronunciation: [xaˈβjeɾ ˈlopeθ]; born 21 January 1986) is a Spanish former professional footballer who played mainly as a full-back.

He spent the vast majority of his professional career with Espanyol, signing in 2007 and appearing in 283 competitive matches during his spell. In November 2020, he moved to the Australian A-League with Adelaide United.

== Club career ==
=== Espanyol ===
Born in Osuna, Province of Seville, Andalusia, and a product of Real Betis' youth ranks, López signed with RCD Espanyol in 2007. On 4 October 2009, he made his debut for the first team of the latter club in a La Liga match against Villarreal CF, taking the pitch with less than ten minutes to go as the ten-man side eventually held off the hosts to a 0–0 draw. The vast majority of his first season was spent, however, with the reserves, which suffered relegation from Segunda División B.

López was promoted to the main squad for the 2010–11 campaign, being used by manager Mauricio Pochettino in various midfield and defender positions. He recorded a combined 27 matches across the league and the Copa del Rey as his side finished eighth on the table – their highest position since 2004–05.

López scored his first goal as a professional on 18 September 2011, but in a 2–1 away loss to Real Zaragoza where he was also sent off for two bookable offences; one of them resulted in a penalty.

On 29 March 2014, after Kiko Casilla was sent off late in the home fixture against FC Barcelona and his team had no replacements left, López played as a goalkeeper; he conceded no goals in the 1–0 defeat. He extended his contract for two more years in March 2017, and earned an automatic extension to that deal due to playing the majority of games at the age of 33.

López took over the captaincy at the beginning of 2015–16 from Sergio García, following the forward's departure. On 21 July 2020, he signed a new deal after Espanyol's relegation; a month later, however, he terminated it citing the need for a new challenge, leaving with 283 appearances to his credit.

=== Adelaide United ===
López joined Adelaide United FC on 25 November 2020, on a one-year deal. He was persuaded to join by his compatriot Isaías, becoming in the process the sixth Spaniard to play for the A-League club.

In June 2021, López and fellow Spaniard Juande signed new deals to stay in South Australia for the following season. He scored his first goal for Adelaide on 1 January in a 4–0 win over Wellington Phoenix FC at Hindmarsh Stadium. After contributing to a fourth-place finish and post-season semi-final, he was named as a substitute in the league's team of the year at the PFA Footballer of the Year Awards, and his contract was extended for another year.

At the end of the 2023–24 campaign, López agreed to a new contract alongside Isaías, one that would see out his playing career as he also completed a coaching badge with the club. Both announced their retirement on 13 May 2025, with López having played exactly 100 matches during his tenure.

Subsequently, López worked as assistant youth coach for Adelaide United.

== Honours ==
Individual

- PFA A-League Men Team of the Season: 2021–22
