= 2024–25 Adelaide United FC season =

21st season in the existence of Adelaide United FC

Adelaide United
2024–25 season
- Chairman: Ned Morris (to 5 September 2024)
- Manager: Carl Veart
- Stadium: Coopers Stadium; ServiceFM Stadium
- A-League Men: 6th
- A-League Men Finals: Elimination-final
- Australia Cup: Semi-finals
- Top goalscorer: League: Archie Goodwin (13); All: Archie Goodwin (13)
- Highest home attendance: 14,131 vs. Melbourne Victory; 18 January 2025; A-League Men
- Lowest home attendance: 2,906 vs. Western Sydney Wanderers; 12 September 2024; Australia Cup
- Average home league attendance: 10,575
- Biggest win: 4–0 vs. Central Coast Mariners (A); 13 December 2024; A-League Men
- Biggest defeat: 1–4 vs. Sydney FC (A); 1 February 2025; A-League Men; 0–3 vs. Western United (A); 23 February 2025; A-League Men; 1–4 vs. Perth Glory (A); 12 April 2025; A-League Men
Home colours	Away colours
- All statistics correct as of 9 May 2025.

The 2024–25 season was the 21st in the history of Adelaide United Football Club since its establishment in 2003. The club participated in the A-League Men for the 20th consecutive season, finishing sixth and qualified for the finals series for the 14th time, in which they failed to progress past the first round for the first time since 2018. The club also made its 10th consecutive appearance in the Australia Cup, in which they reached the semi-finals for the first time since 2019.

Adelaide United's pre-season was headlined by the loss of Nestory Irankunda, who joined Bayern Munich after agreeing terms with the club in November 2023 for a record domestic Australian transfer fee, and last season's top scorer, Hiroshi Ibusuki, who netted 15 goals across the 2023–24 season. Adelaide brought in young domestic players Archie Goodwin from Newcastle Jets, and Dylan Pierias from Western Sydney Wanderers. Experienced Dutch defender Bart Vriends joined the club at the end of June, and A-League stalwarts Ben Folami and Jordan Elsey were recruited in September. After two wins away to NPL clubs, Adelaide defeated Western Sydney Wanderers after extra time to reach the semi-finals for the first time since they won the competition in 2019, where they suffered a late 0–1 loss away to Melbourne Victory.

Adelaide started the A-League Men season eight games undefeated, which included a 4–0 win away to Central Coast Mariners. Their first defeat came in the last match of 2024, giving up a two-goal advantage at home against Western Sydney Wanderers. The Reds returned to form in January, going the month undefeated, including a 3–2 win at home against rivals Melbourne Victory, their first win over the Victorians in 800 days, which sent them top of the ladder. After this, the Reds won just two of their remaining 14 league matches, scraping into finals by a single point, where they were defeated 2–3 in the elimination-finals by Western United. Despite this, Archie Goodwin became the first Adelaide United player since Sergio van Dijk in 2010–11 to win the A-League Men Golden Boot award with 13 goals across the season, joint with Sydney FC's Adrian Segecic.

== Season summary ==
=== Pre-season ===
On 10 May 2024, 20-year-old goalkeeper Ethan Cox extended his contract for a further three years, having come through Football SA's NTC program. On 14 May, the departure of Ben Halloran was announced. Two days later, Hiroshi Ibusuki departed the club by mutual consent. Hiroshi was last season's top scorer with 15 goals in 26 matches and intended to remain with the club; however, his request for a longer-term deal was rejected. On 17 May, Nick Ansell, Lachlan Barr, Harry Van der Saag, and Ben Warland were released following the expiration of their contracts.

On 27 May, former Dutch international Ernest Faber was announced as the club's new technical director in order to improve the club's coaching and recruitment. The announcement came a few months after a strategic partnership with PSV Eindhoven was finalised. On 28 May, three Adelaide United players, Luka Jovanovic, Bailey O'Neil, and Jonny Yull, were selected for the Young Socceroos' squad for their June tour of South America. The next day, Nestory Irankunda was named as one of eight A-League Men players to feature in the Socceroos' squad for their final second round World Cup qualifiers against Bangladesh and Palestine. This was Irankunda's first official call-up to the squad, having previously joined as a train-on player in March 2023. The callup came a week after Irankunda publicly commented that he would consider his international future with other nations if he wasn't called up to the Socceroos squad, as he was eligible to represent Burundi or Tanzania.

On 4 June, Spaniards Isaías and Javi López both signed a one-year contract extension ahead of their joint retirement at the end of the season, whilst studying for coaching badges. On 6 June, 19-year-old Newcastle Jets centre-forward, Archie Goodwin, signed with Adelaide United on a four-year contract. On 21 June, 24-year-old winger, Dylan Pierias, signed with the club on a three-year contract, following his expiration of his contract with Western Sydney Wanderers. On 25 June, Musa Toure was signed by Ligue 2 side Clermont Foot for an undisclosed fee. The next day, Austin Ayoubi signed a two-year contract extension with the club. On 30 June, 33-year-old Dutch centre-back, Bart Vriends, signed a two-year contract with Adelaide, joining from Eredivise club, Sparta Rotterdam. On 4 July, young centre-back, Panagiotis Kikianis, signed a five-year contract with the club, the longest contract in A-League history.

Adelaide United played their first pre-season friendly on 9 July against The Cove of SA State League 2, winning 9–0 in front of 2,500 spectators, with goals from Dylan Pierias, Ryan Kitto, Austin Ayoubi, Archie Goodwin, Ryan White, and braces from Luka Jovanovic and Yaya Dukuly. A second pre-season friendly took place a week later on 16 July against Adelaide Blue Eagles of State League 1, which United won 6–0. Stefan Mauk scored twice in addition to goals from Goodwin, Pierias, Jovanovic and Ayoubi. The final friendly before the Australia Cup was an 8–1 win against Cumberland United, with Jovanovic scoring once, Panashe Madanha and Zach Clough scoring braces and Goodwin getting a hat-trick.

=== Australia Cup ===
The draw for the Australia Cup round of 32 took place on 19 June 2024. Adelaide United were drawn away to NPL NSW side Blacktown City. Stefan Mauk gave Adelaide the lead midway through the first half, but Blacktown equalised in the second half, forcing extra time. Yaya Dukuly broke the deadlock after eight minutes and Austin Ayoubi confirmed the result in the 108th. Blacktown brought one back in the dying minutes, as Adelaide progressed to the next round.

On 6 August, Adelaide United completed the signing of 19-year-old Dutch winger Julian Kwaaitaal on a three-year deal with the option to extend for a further year from PSV Eindhoven. The club immediately loaned him out to Eerste Divisie club, FC Eindhoven, which ensured that Kwaaitaal didn't take up a visa slot. On 7 August, the club released their home kit for the season, which pays homage to Adelaide's nickname as the 'City of Churches', with a design inspired by the archway of St Peter's Cathedral. The kit was showcased at Adelaide's fourth friendly match against West Adelaide to open the Hellas' new home stadium, the Kilburn Sportsplex. Adelaide won the match 8–0; Austin Ayoubi scored four goals, trialist Godwin Bentil got a brace, and Jonny Yull and Josh Cavallo scored one each. On 8 August, Feyzo Kasumović, Malual Nichola and Amlani Tatu signed three-year scholarship contracts with the club, and the next day, Ethan Alagich became the second Reds player to sign a five-year contract with the club. Adelaide played a fifth friendly match against Adelaide Croatia Raiders on 14 August, winning the match 3–1 with goals from Luka Jovanovic, Austin Ayoubi and Josh Cavallo.

In the round of 16, Adelaide were drawn against away to NPL WA side, Olympic Kingsway. Austin Ayoubi opened the scoring after 11 minutes, however, Liam Boland equalised for the hosts shortly before half time. Adelaide retook the lead in the 48th minute through an own goal, and extended their lead in the 71st. Kingsway brought one back in the 85th minute through a penalty, the match ending 3–2 in United's favour.

On 5 September, the club's chairman, Ned Morris, stepped down from his role, transitioning to an advisory role after 18 months in charge of the club. On 10 September, former captain and club legend, Travis Dodd, returned to the club as an assistant coach.

Adelaide United hosted the Western Sydney Wanderers in the quarter-finals of the competition, at ServiceFM Stadium. Austin Ayoubi once again opened the scoring for United, who dominated the match until the Wanderers equalised in the 68th minute to bring the match to extra time. Three minutes after the restart, Ryan Kitto retook the lead for United, who advanced to the semi-final for the first time since they won the competition in 2019.

On 15 September, 19-year-old goalkeeper, Max Vartuli, signed a three-year contract with Adelaide United, joining from Sydney FC Youth. On 17 September, Ben Folami joined the club on a four-year deal from rivals Melbourne Victory. On 19 September, centre-back, Jordan Elsey, returned to the club on a one-year contract.

Adelaide were knocked out of the cup at the semi-final stage for the first time in the competition's history, falling late away to rivals, Melbourne Victory.

On 25 September, the $53.5 million redevelopment to Coopers Stadium was completed. Safe standing was installed in the N13 and N14 bays, additional screens were installed around the ground, and the pitch was re-laid with turf which is said to be superior during summer. The Reds travelled to Mildura to play in a pre-season friendly again Brisbane Roar, which ended in a 1–1 draw. Adelaide played one final pre-season match against Melbourne City on 14 October. The behind-closed-doors match ended in a 1–0 win.

=== A-League Men ===
==== October–January ====
Adelaide United participated in the A-League Men for the 20th time. The full fixture list was released on 2 August 2024. Adelaide United received a bye in the first, 11th and final rounds. Their season kicked off on 26 October 2024 with a 1–1 draw at home against Central Coast Mariners; Luka Jovanovic scored the opener in the 10th minute, however they were unable to extend their lead before the Mariners equalised in the 62nd minute. They followed this up with two wins before the international break; a 4–3 win away against Western Sydney Wanderers, and a 2–1 win at home against Western United, where the opposition controversially didn't receive a penalty after Ryan Kitto fouled Abel Walatee in the box whilst the scores were level. Football Australia's head of referees, Jon Moss, said in a statement two days later that VAR made an "error in judgement", and that a penalty should have been awarded.

After the international break, Adelaide faced Brisbane Roar in the second edition of Unite Round. Falling behind twice during the match, Adelaide eventually won 3–2, thanks to Archie Goodwin's 62nd-minute goal, his first for the club. A week later, they drew 2–2 with Perth Glory, in which United had two goals disallowed for offside, and a late penalty claim for a handball ignored. Adelaide travelled to Northern New South Wales to play Newcastle Jets and Central Coast Mariners in back-to-back weeks. An early Stefan Mauk goal was the only of a 1–0 win over the Jets, in which Ben Folami was sent off for "serious unsporting conduct" "after making contact to the face of Phillip Cancar in a tussle with the Newcastle Jets defender." A week later, Adelaide snapped a five-year winless run in Gosford with a 4–0 win against the Mariners. Goodwin opened the scoring early, and a second-half blitz from Kikianis, Mauk, and Dukuly gave Adelaide their biggest win since October 2023. The match was Isaías' 239th A-League appearance for the club, surpassing current goalkeeping coach Eugene Galekovic for the record of most league matches played.

On 17 December, captain Ryan Kitto signed a two-year contract extension, with an option for an additional year. Adelaide then played two consecutive home games against both halves of the Sydney Derby. In the first match, Adelaide led Sydney FC 3–1 at the hour mark, thanks to a Goodwin brace each side of Mauk's 25th-minute goal, before conceding two late goals; Douglas Costa in the 89th minute, and Jordan Courtney-Perkins in the fifth minute of stoppage time. In their final match of the year, Adelaide once again led by two goals: Ethan Alagich and Goodwin scored twice in four minutes to give United a healthy lead over Western Sydney Wanderers. Marcus Antonsson and Brandon Borrello scored on either side of half-time to equalise, and Bozhidar Kraev scored with ten minutes left in a half that the Wanderers dominated, ending Adelaide's eight-game unbeaten start to the season.

On 5 January 2025, assistant coach Mark Milligan departed the club for an overseas opportunity. The next month, Milligan was appointed as assistant coach for the Malaysian national team. Adelaide's first game of the new year was away to Macarthur FC on a Monday night. In a game that looked destined to finish as a goalless draw, Macarthur's Valère Germain broke the deadlock in the 80th minute. Macarthur held their lead for just five minutes until Oliver Randazzo fouled Yaya Dukuly inside the box, winning a penalty that Zach Clough would convert. Substitute Luka Jovanovic, who returned to the squad after being omitted for disciplinary reasons the previous week, scored in the second minute of stoppage time to bump the Reds up to second on the ladder. Adelaide made the trip over to Wellington the next week to play the Phoenix. An early Matthew Sheridan own goal put Adelaide ahead in a tightly contested affair, until Corban Piper squared the ledger in the 50th minute. Jovanovic once again came off the bench to score the winner, after a goalkeeping mistake gifted him the ball in the six-yard box, which gave Adelaide their sixth consecutive away win, the longest away winning run in A-League history.

On 14 January, Jay Barnett signed a three-year contract extension. Adelaide then played Melbourne Victory in the second Original Rivalry of the season. In front of a sold-out Coopers Stadium crowd, Victory took the lead in the 18th minute through Ryan Teague. Adelaide would come back to lead into the half-time break; Stefan Mauk equalised in the 31st minute, and a defensive mix-up between Josh Rawlins and Roderick Miranda caused the latter to score an own goal in first half stoppage time. Santos once again levelled the score with a diving header for Victory in the 66th minute, however, Ethan Alagich scored the eventual winner five minutes later to give United their first Original Rivalry win in 600 days, and send them to the top of the table. A quick turnaround saw them playing second placed Auckland FC in the first encounter between the two clubs. The away side got the breakthrough after more than an hour thanks to Neyder Moreno, who came off the bench to capitalise on a defensive mistake. Archie Goodwin then scored a brace in the 81st and 95th minutes, despite a lengthy VAR check on the latter. Logan Rogerson then equalised for Auckland in the ninth minute of stoppage time with the final play of the game. The result was Adelaide's fourth draw in six home games, but ensured that both sides remained neck-and-neck at the top of the ladder.

== Coaching staff ==
Position	Name	Ref.
Head coach	(Australia) Carl Veart	
Assistant coach	(Australia) Travis Dodd	
Assistant coach Head of youth football	(Brazil) Airton Andrioli	
Head of football	(Australia) Marius Zanin	
Goalkeeping coach	(Australia) Eugene Galekovic	
Technical director	(Netherlands) Ernest Faber	

== Players ==
=== Squad ===
Note: Flags indicate national team as defined under FIFA eligibility rules; some limited exceptions apply. Players may hold more than one non-FIFA nationality.

No.	Pos.	Nation	Player
1	GK	AUS	James Delianov
3	DF	NED	Bart Vriends
4	DF	AUS	Jordan Elsey
6	MF	AUS	Stefan Mauk (vice-captain)
7	DF	AUS	Ryan Kitto (captain)
8	MF	ESP	Isaías (vice-captain)
9	FW	AUS	Luka Jovanovic
10	FW	ENG	Zach Clough
12	MF	AUS	Jonny Yull
13	GK	AUS	Max Vartuli
14	MF	AUS	Jay Barnett
17	FW	AUS	Ben Folami
19	FW	AUS	Yaya Dukuly
20	MF	AUS	Dylan Pierias
21	DF	ESP	Javi López
22	MF	ENG	Ryan Tunnicliffe

No.	Pos.	Nation	Player
23	MF	AUS	Luke Duzel
26	FW	AUS	Archie Goodwin
27	DF	AUS	Josh Cavallo
36	DF	AUS	Panashe Madanha
40	GK	AUS	Ethan Cox
42	FW	LBN	Austin Ayoubi
44	MF	AUS	Ryan White
51	DF	AUS	Panagiotis Kikianis (scholarship)
54	DF	AUS	Bailey O'Neil (scholarship)
55	MF	AUS	Ethan Alagich
58	FW	AUS	Harry Crawford
62	MF	AUS	Fabian Talladira (scholarship)
74	FW	AUS	Amlani Tatu (scholarship)
78	DF	AUS	Malual Nichola (scholarship)
79	DF	AUS	Feyzo Kasumović (scholarship)

=== Other players ===
Youth players who featured in a matchday squad, but are uncontracted to the senior team.

Note: Flags indicate national team as defined under FIFA eligibility rules; some limited exceptions apply. Players may hold more than one non-FIFA nationality.

No.	Pos.	Nation	Player
52	DF	AUS	Sotiris Phillis
60	GK	AUS	Oscar Page

No.	Pos.	Nation	Player
65	MF	AUS	Joey Garuccio

== Transfers and contracts ==
=== Transfers in ===
No.	Position	Player	From	Type/fee	Contract length	Date	Ref
26	FW	Archie Goodwin	Newcastle Jets	Free transfer	4 years	6 June 2024	
20	MF	Dylan Pierias	Western Sydney Wanderers	Free transfer	3 years	21 June 2024	
3	DF	(Netherlands) Bart Vriends	(Netherlands) Sparta Rotterdam	Free transfer	2 years	30 June 2024	
	FW	(Netherlands) Julian Kwaaitaal	(Netherlands) PSV Eindhoven	Free transfer	3 years (Note: Option for an additional year.)	6 August 2024	
13	GK	Max Vartuli	Sydney FC Youth	Free transfer	3 years	15 September 2024	
17	FW	Ben Folami	Melbourne Victory	Free transfer	4 years	17 September 2024	
4	DF	Jordan Elsey	Unattached	Free transfer	1 year	19 September 2024	

==== From youth squad ====
N	Pos.	Nat.	Name	Age	Notes
74	FW	(Australia)	Amlani Tatu	16	3-year scholarship
78	DF	(Australia)	Malual Nichola	16	3-year scholarship
79	DF	(Australia)	Feyzo Kasumović	16	3-year scholarship
44	MF	(Australia)	Ryan White	19	5-year contract
58	FW	(Australia)	Harry Crawford	18	4.5-year contract

=== Transfers out ===
No.	Position	Player	Transferred to	Type/fee	Date	Ref
26	FW	Ben Halloran	Unattached	End of contract	14 May 2024	
9	FW	(Japan) Hiroshi Ibusuki	Unattached	End of contract	16 May 2024	
4	DF	Nick Ansell	Unattached	End of contract	17 May 2024	
13	DF	Lachlan Barr	Unattached	End of contract	17 May 2024	
2	DF	Harry Van der Saag	Brisbane Roar	End of contract	17 May 2024	
3	DF	Ben Warland	Brisbane Roar	End of contract	17 May 2024	
49	FW	Musa Toure	(France) Clermont Foot	Undisclosed fee	25 June 2024	
66	FW	Nestory Irankunda	(Germany) Bayern Munich	Undisclosed fee (Note: Reported to be $5,700,000 plus add-ons.)	1 July 2024	
—	FW	(Netherlands) Julian Kwaaitaal	(Netherlands) FC Eindhoven	1 year loan	6 August 2024	

=== Contract extensions ===
No.	Player	Position	Duration	Date	Notes	Ref.
40	Ethan Cox	Goalkeeper	3 years	10 May 2024	Replaces previous contract which ran until end of 2024–25.	
8	(Spain) Isaías	Defensive midfielder	1 year	4 June 2024		
21	(Spain) Javi López	Right-back	1 year	4 June 2024		
42	(Lebanon) Austin Ayoubi	Winger	2 years	26 June 2024		
51	Panagiotis Kikianis	Centre-back	5 years	4 July 2024		
55	Ethan Alagich	Centre midfielder	5 years	9 August 2024	Replaces previous contract which ran until end of 2024–25.	
7	Ryan Kitto	Left-back	2 years	17 December 2024	Contract extended from end of 2024–25 to end of 2026–27.	
14	Jay Barnett	Defensive midfielder	3 years	14 January 2025	New contract from 2025 to 2026, replacing previous contract which ran until end of 2025–26.	
9	Luka Jovanovic	Striker	1 year	9 February 2026	Extension trigger met, contract extended from end of 2025–26 to end of 2026–27	

== Pre-season and friendlies ==
9 July 2024	The Cove (Australia)	0–9	Adelaide United	Adelaide
18:30 ACST		Report	Jovanovic (?); Pierias (?); Kitto (?); Ayoubi (?); Goodwin (?); Dukuly (?); White (?)	Stadium: Southern Soccer Facility; Attendance: 2,500

16 July 2024	Adelaide Blue Eagles (Australia)	0–6	Adelaide United	Adelaide
19:00 ACST		Report	Mauk (?); Goodwin (?); Pierias (?); Jovanovic (?); Ayoubi (?)	Stadium: Marden Sports Complex

23 July 2024	Cumberland United (Australia)	1–8	Adelaide United	Adelaide
19:00 ACST	Elliott (?)	Report	Goodwin (?); Madanha (?); Clough (?); Jovanovic (?)	Stadium: A.A. Bailey Reserve

7 August 2024	West Adelaide (Australia)	0–8	Adelaide United	Adelaide
19:00 ACST		Report	Ayoubi (?); Bentil (?); Yull (?); Cavallo (?)	Stadium: Kilburn Sportsplex

14 August 2024	Adelaide Croatia Raiders (Australia)	1–3	Adelaide United	Adelaide
19:00 ACST	Costa (?)	Report	Jovanovic (?); Ayoubi (?); Cavallo (?)	Stadium: Croatian Sports Centre

27 September 2024	Adelaide United	5–0	(Australia) NPLSA All Stars	Adelaide
19:30 ACST	White 9'; Clough 19'; Cavallo 62'; Ayoubi 90'; Garuccio 90+2'	Source		Stadium: ServiceFM Stadium

5 October 2024	Adelaide United	1–1	(Australia) Brisbane Roar	Mildura
17:30 AEST	Kitto (?)	Report	Acosta (?)	Stadium: Mildura Sporting Precinct

12 October 2024	Adelaide United	1–0	(Australia) Melbourne City	Adelaide
	Mauk 87'	Report		Stadium: Coopers Stadium; Attendance: 0 (behind closed doors)

== Competitions ==
=== Overall record ===
Competition	First match	Last match	Starting round	Final position	Record							
Competition	First match	Last match	Starting round	Final position	Pld	W	D	L	GF	GA	GD	Win %
A-League Men	26 October 2023	26 April 2025	Matchweek 2	6th	26	10	9	7	53	55	−2	38.46
A-League Men finals series	9 May 2025	9 May 2025	Elimination final	Elimination final	1	0	0	1	2	3	−1	0.00
Australia Cup	31 July 2024	21 September 2024	Round of 32	Semi-finals	4	3	0	1	8	6	+2	75.00
Total					31	13	9	9	63	64	−1	41.94

Source: Soccerway

=== A-League Men ===
==== League table ====
Pos	Team	Pld	W	D	L	GF	GA	GD	Pts	Qualification
4	Western Sydney Wanderers	26	13	7	6	58	40	+18	46	Qualification for Finals series (Note: The top two teams enter the finals series at the semi-finals, while the teams ranked third to sixth enter the finals series at the elimination-finals.)
5	Melbourne Victory	26	12	7	7	44	36	+8	43	Qualification for Finals series
6	Adelaide United	26	10	8	8	53	55	−2	38	Qualification for Finals series
7	Sydney FC	26	10	7	9	53	46	+7	37	
8	Macarthur FC	26	9	6	11	50	45	+5	33	Qualification for AFC Champions League Two (Note: Qualified for AFC Champions League Two as the 2024 Australia Cup winners.)

Source: A-Leagues
Rules for classification: 1) points; 2) goal difference; 3) goals scored; 4) wins; 5) head-to-head results; 5a) head-to-head points; 5b) head-to-head goal difference; 6) Fair Play points; 7) away goal difference; 8) away goals per match; 9) home goal difference; 10) home goals per match; 11) toss of a coin in an event of a tie of two clubs.

==== Results summary ====
Overall								Home						Away					
Pld	W	D	L	GF	GA	GD	Pts	W	D	L	GF	GA	GD	W	D	L	GF	GA	GD
26	10	8	8	53	55	−2	38	4	5	4	27	27	0	6	3	4	26	28	−2

Source: Ultimate A-League
Away figures include Adelaide United's 3–2 win on neutral ground in Unite Round against Brisbane Roar on 23 November 2024.

==== Results by round ====
Round	1	2	3	4	5	6	7	8	9	10	11	12	13	15	14	17	18	19	20	21	22	23	24	25	26	27	16	28	29
Ground	B	H	A	H	N	H	A	A	H	H	B	A	A	H	H	A	H	H	A	A	H	H	A	H	A	H	A	A	B
Result	✖	D	W	W	W	D	W	W	D	L	✖	W	W	W	D	L	W	L	L	D	D	L	L	L	L	W	D	D	✖
Position	9	10	5	5	4	3	3	2	2	2	3	2	2	1	1	2	2	2	2	3	5	6	6	7	7	7	7	6	6
Points	0	1	4	7	10	11	14	17	18	18	18	21	24	27	28	28	31	31	31	32	33	33	33	33	33	36	37	38	38

Source: Ultimate A-League
A = Away; H = Home; N = Neutral; B = Bye; W = Win; D = Draw; L = Loss

==== Matches ====
Unite Round fixtures were released on 18 July 2024. The full fixture list was released on 2 August 2024.

Win Draw Loss

26 October 2024 2	Adelaide United	1–1	Central Coast Mariners	Adelaide
16:30 ACDT	Jovanović 10'	Report	Ngor 62'	Stadium: Coopers Stadium; Attendance: 9,826; Referee: Jonathan Barreiro

2 November 2024 3	Western Sydney Wanderers	3–4	Adelaide United	Sydney
19:35 AEDT	Milanovic 24'; Kraev 53'; Borrello 75'	Report	Jovanovic 4'; Ayoubi 21'; Pierias 27', 63'	Stadium: CommBank Stadium; Attendance: 7,244; Referee: Alex King

9 November 2024 4	Adelaide United	2–1	Western United	Adelaide
19:05 ACDT	Leonard 32' (o.g.); Clough 71'	Report	Vidmar 10'	Stadium: Coopers Stadium; Attendance: 10,166; Referee: Daniel Elder
Note: Originally scheduled for 20:00, the match was brought forward 55 minutes.

23 November 2024 5	Brisbane Roar	2–3	Adelaide United	Sydney
17:00 AEDT	Jelacic 6'; O'Shea 43' (pen.)	Report	Mauk 33'; Clough 46'; Goodwin 62'	Stadium: Allianz Stadium; Attendance: 15,249 (double header); Referee: Alex King

29 November 2024 6	Adelaide United	2–2	Perth Glory	Adelaide
19:05 ACDT	Clough 49'; Vriends 50'	Report	Taggart 48', 61'	Stadium: Coopers Stadium; Attendance: 8,443; Referee: Shaun Evans

7 December 2024 7	Newcastle Jets	0–1	Adelaide United	Newcastle
17:00 AEDT		Report	Mauk 14'	Stadium: McDonald Jones Stadium; Attendance: 5,713; Referee: Ben Abraham

13 December 2024 8	Central Coast Mariners	0–4	Adelaide United	Gosford
19:35 AEDT		Report	Goodwin 12'; Kikianis 49'; Mauk 60'; Dukuly 73'	Stadium: Industree Group Stadium; Attendance: 4,108; Referee: Jonathan Barreiro

20 December 2024 9	Adelaide United	3–3	Sydney FC	Adelaide
19:05 ACDT	Goodwin 5', 54'; Mauk 25'	Report	Costa 16', 89'; Courtney-Perkins 90+5'	Stadium: Coopers Stadium; Attendance: 11,907; Referee: Daniel Elder

27 December 2024 10	Adelaide United	2–3	Western Sydney Wanderers	Adelaide
19:05 ACDT	Alagich 31'; Goodwin 34'	Report	Antonsson 45+1'; Borrello 49'; Kraev 82'	Stadium: Coopers Stadium; Attendance: 13,227; Referee: Daniel Cook

6 January 2025 12	Macarthur FC	1–2	Adelaide United	Leumeah
17:00 AEDT	Germain 80'	Report	Clough 85' (pen.); Jovanovic 90+2'	Stadium: Campbelltown Sports Stadium; Attendance: 3,789; Referee: Tim Danaskos

11 January 2025 13	Wellington Phoenix	1–2	Adelaide United	Wellington
17:00 NZDT	Piper 50'	Report	Sheridan 7' (o.g.); Jovanovic 75'	Stadium: Sky Stadium; Attendance: 7,113; Referee: Alex King

18 January 2025 15	Adelaide United	3–2	Melbourne Victory	Adelaide
19:05 ACDT	Mauk 31'; Miranda 45+1' (o.g.); Alagich 71'	Report	Teague 18'; Santos 66'	Stadium: Coopers Stadium; Attendance: 14,131; Referee: Alireza Faghani

22 January 2025 14	Adelaide United	2–2	Auckland FC	Adelaide
19:00 ACDT	Goodwin 81', 90+5'	Report	Moreno 66'; Rogerson 90+9'	Stadium: Coopers Stadium; Attendance: 12,171; Referee: Alex King

1 February 2025 17	Sydney FC	4–1	Adelaide United	Sydney
15:00 AEDT	Lolley 36'; Klimala 46'; Segecic 75'; Caceres 83'	Report	Pierias 49'	Stadium: Allianz Stadium; Attendance: 13,096; Referee: Shaun Evans

7 February 2025 18	Adelaide United	1–0	Melbourne City	Adelaide
19:05 ACDT	Goodwin 52'	Report		Stadium: Coopers Stadium; Attendance: 11,270; Referee: Ben Abraham

15 February 2025 19	Adelaide United	1–2	Newcastle Jets	Adelaide
19:05 ACDT	Mauk 45+1'	Report	Rose 37'; Taylor 55'	Stadium: Coopers Stadium; Attendance: 10,722; Referee: Shane Skinner

23 February 2025 20	Western United	3–0	Adelaide United	Tarneit
15:00 AEDT	Botic 26'; Ibusuki 59' (pen.); Danzaki 88'	Report		Stadium: Ironbark Fields; Attendance: 2,982; Referee: Shaun Evans

1 March 2025 21	Auckland FC	4–4	Adelaide United	Auckland
17:00 NZDT	May 10', 14'; Rogerson 52'; Sakai 90+2'	Report	Elsey 30'; Clough 61' (pen.), 79' (pen.); Vriends 90+8'	Stadium: Go Media Stadium; Attendance: 16,709; Referee: Daniel Elder

8 March 2025 22	Adelaide United	1–1	Brisbane Roar	Adelaide
14:30 ACDT	Crawford 45+3'	Report	Brazete 68'	Stadium: Coopers Stadium; Attendance: 8,082; Referee: Lachlan Keevers

14 March 2025 23	Adelaide United	4–5	Macarthur FC	Adelaide
19:05 ACDT	Ayoubi 13'; Kitto 19'; Mauk 42'; Goodwin 73'	Report	Ikonomidis 8'; Adamson 10'; Brattan 53', 83'; Jakoliš 58'	Stadium: Coopers Stadium; Attendance: 6,125; Referee: Tim Danaskos

29 March 2025 24	Melbourne Victory	5–3	Adelaide United	Melbourne
19:35 AEDT	Arzani 29', 71' (pen.); Velupillay 39'; Vergos 88', 90'	Report	Yull 12'; Goodwin 47'; Clough 56'	Stadium: AAMI Park; Attendance: 10,273; Referee: Shaun Evans

5 April 2025 25	Adelaide United	2–3	Sydney FC	Adelaide
19:05 ACDT	Goodwin 46', 73'	Report	Klimala 18', 52'; Segecic 90+4'	Stadium: Coopers Stadium; Attendance: 10,239; Referee: Ben Abraham

12 April 2025 26	Perth Glory	4–1	Adelaide United	Perth
18:45 AWST	Taggart 11'; Ostler 19'; Pearman 73', 80'	Report	Folami 24'	Stadium: HBF Park; Attendance: 5,986; Referee: Sam Kelly

18 April 2025 27	Adelaide United	3–2	Wellington Phoenix	Adelaide
19:05 ACST	Kikianis 8'; Mauk 12'; Goodwin 89'	Report	Barbarouses 31'; Hughes 35'	Stadium: Coopers Stadium; Attendance: 11,169; Referee: Tim Danaskos

22 April 2025 16	Brisbane Roar	1–1	Adelaide United	Brisbane
19:00 AEST	Abubakar 59'	Report	Pierias 11'	Stadium: Suncorp Stadium; Attendance: 2,454; Referee: Casey Reibelt
Note: Originally scheduled for 25 January 2025 at 15:00, the match was postponed due to a scheduling conflict with Luke Combs' performance at Suncorp Stadium.

26 April 2025 28	Melbourne City	0–0	Adelaide United	Melbourne
19:45 AEST		Report		Stadium: AAMI Park; Attendance: 5,128; Referee: Shaun Evans

==== Finals series ====
9 May 2025 2025 A-League Men finals series	Western United	3–2	Adelaide United	Melbourne
19:35 AEST	Botic 20', 31', 62'	Report	Jovanovic 3'; Mauk 79'	Stadium: Ironbark Fields; Attendance: 3,078; Referee: Alex King

=== Australia Cup ===
Win Draw Loss

31 July 2024 Round of 32	Blacktown City	2–3 (a.e.t.)	Adelaide United	Sydney
19:30 AEST	Major 71'; Awaritefe 119'	Report	Mauk 35'; Dukuly 97'; Jovanovic 107'	Stadium: Landen Stadium; Attendance: 1,531; Referee: Jack Morgan

27 August 2024 Round of 16	Olympic Kingsway	2–3	Adelaide United	Perth
18:30 AWST	Boland 38', 84' (pen.)	Report	Ayoubi 11'; O'Connell 49' (o.g.); Jovanovic 71'	Stadium: Kingsway Reserve; Attendance: 1,950; Referee: Adam Bavcar

12 September 2024 Quarter-finals	Adelaide United	2–1 (a.e.t.)	Western Sydney Wanderers	Adelaide
19:00 ACST	Ayoubi 9'; Kitto 93'	Report	Milanovic 68'	Stadium: ServiceFM Stadium; Attendance: 2,906; Referee: Shaun Evans

21 September 2024 Semi-finals	Melbourne Victory	1–0	Adelaide United	Melbourne
19:30 AEST	Valadon 88'	Report		Stadium: AAMI Park; Attendance: 5,131; Referee: Alex King

== Statistics ==
=== Appearances and goals ===
Includes all competitions. Players with no appearances not included in the list.

As of 9 May 2025

No.	Pos.	Nat.	Player	A-League Men		A-League Men finals series		Australia Cup		Total		Ref			
No.	Pos.	Nat.	Player	Apps	Goals	Apps	Goals	Apps	Goals	Apps	Goals	Ref			
No.	Pos.	Nat.	Player	1	GK	(Australia)	James Delianov	14	0	0	0	4	0	18	0
3	DF	(Netherlands)	Bart Vriends	23	2	1	0	0	0	24	2				
4	DF	(Australia)	Jordan Elsey	2+1	1	0+1	0	0	0	4	1				
6	MF	(Australia)	Stefan Mauk	25+1	8	1	1	4	1	31	10				
7	DF	(Australia)	Ryan Kitto	19	1	1	0	3+1	1	24	2				
8	MF	(Spain)	Isaías	8+13	0	1	0	4	0	26	0				
9	FW	(Australia)	Luka Jovanovic	7+13	4	1	1	3	2	24	7				
10	MF	(England)	Zach Clough	23+3	7	1	0	4	0	31	7				
12	MF	(Australia)	Jonny Yull	6+14	1	0+1	0	2+1	0	24	1				
13	GK	(Australia)	Max Vartuli	5	0	1	0	0	0	6	0				
14	MF	(Australia)	Jay Barnett	21+4	0	0+1	0	2	0	28	0				
17	FW	(Australia)	Ben Folami	13+9	1	0	0	0	0	22	1				
19	FW	(Australia)	Yaya Dukuly	5+14	1	0+1	0	0+4	1	24	2				
20	FW	(Australia)	Dylan Pierias	22+2	4	1	0	3	0	28	4				
21	DF	(Spain)	Javi López	5+1	0	1	0	2+2	0	11	0				
22	MF	(England)	Ryan Tunnicliffe	0+1	0	0	0	0+4	0	5	0				
23	MF	(Australia)	Luke Duzel	0+1	0	0	0	0	0	1	0				
26	FW	(Australia)	Archie Goodwin	19+7	13	0	0	0	0	26	13				
36	DF	(Australia)	Panashe Madanha	0+3	0	0	0	2	0	5	0				
40	GK	(Australia)	Ethan Cox	7	0	0	0	0	0	7	0				
42	MF	(Lebanon)	Austin Ayoubi	7+8	2	0	0	3+1	2	19	3				
44	MF	(Australia)	Ryan White	2+15	0	0	0	1+3	0	21	0				
51	DF	(Australia)	Panagiotis Kikianis	22	2	1	0	3	0	26	12				
55	MF	(Australia)	Ethan Alagich	26	2	1	0	4	0	31	2				
58	FW	(Australia)	Harry Crawford	4+1	1	0+1	0	0+2	0	8	1				
62	MF	(Australia)	Fabian Talladira	1	0	0	0	0	0	1	0				
74	FW	(Australia)	Amlani Tatu	0+3	0	0	0	0	0	3	0				

=== Disciplinary record ===
Includes all competitions. The list is sorted by squad number when total cards are equal. Players with no cards not included in the list.

As of 9 May 2025

Rank	No.	Pos.	Nat.	Player	A-League Men			A-League Men finals series			Australia Cup			Total			Ref
Rank	No.	Pos.	Nat.	Player	Yellow card	(yellow card) (yellow-red card)	Red card	Yellow card	(yellow card) (yellow-red card)	Red card	Yellow card	(yellow card) (yellow-red card)	Red card	Yellow card	(yellow card) (yellow-red card)	Red card	Ref
1	17	FW	(Australia)	Ben Folami	1	0	1	0	0	0	0	0	0	1	0	1	
2	51	DF	(Australia)	Panagiotis Kikianis	6	0	0	1	0	0	0	0	0	7	0	0	
3	6	MF	(Australia)	Stefan Mauk	4	0	0	1	0	0	0	0	0	5	0	0	
4	3	DF	(Netherlands)	Bart Vriends	4	0	0	0	0	0	0	0	0	4	0	0	
4	10	MF	(England)	Zach Clough	3	0	0	0	0	0	1	0	0	4	0	0	
6	9	FW	(Australia)	Luka Jovanovic	2	0	0	0	0	0	1	0	0	3	0	0	
6	21	DF	(Spain)	Javi López	1	0	0	0	0	0	2	0	0	3	0	0	
8	55	MF	(Australia)	Ethan Alagich	1	0	0	0	0	0	1	0	0	2	0	0	
9	1	GK	(Australia)	James Delianov	1	0	0	0	0	0	0	0	0	1	0	0	
9	7	DF	(Australia)	Ryan Kitto	1	0	0	0	0	0	0	0	0	1	0	0	
9	8	MF	(Spain)	Isaías	1	0	0	0	0	0	0	0	0	1	0	0	
9	14	MF	(Australia)	Jay Barnett	1	0	0	0	0	0	0	0	0	1	0	0	
9	19	FW	(Australia)	Yaya Dukuly	0	0	0	0	0	0	1	0	0	1	0	0	
9	22	MF	(England)	Ryan Tunnicliffe	0	0	0	0	0	0	1	0	0	1	0	0	
9	36	DF	(Australia)	Panashe Madanha	1	0	0	0	0	0	0	0	0	1	0	0	
Total					27	0	1	2	0	0	7	0	0	36	0	1	

=== Clean sheets ===
Includes all competitions. The list is sorted by squad number when total clean sheets are equal. Numbers in parentheses represent games where both goalkeepers participated and both kept a clean sheet; the number in parentheses is awarded to the goalkeeper who was substituted on, whilst a full clean sheet is awarded to the goalkeeper who was on the field at the start of play. Goalkeepers with no clean sheets not included in the list.

As of 9 May 2025

Rank	No.	Nat.	Goalkeeper	A-League Men	A-League Men finals series	Australia Cup	Total
1	1	(Australia)	James Delianov	2	0	0	2
2	13	(Australia)	Max Vartuli	1	0	0	1
2	40	(Australia)	Ethan Cox	1	0	0	1
Total				4	0	0	4

== Awards ==
Adelaide United's annual awards ceremony, the Alagich Vidmar Awards (named after Dianne Alagich and Aurelio Vidmar), took place on 14 May 2025.

Ethan Alagich won the Aurelio Vidmar Medal as the best performing player across the season. Archie Goodwin won the most awards of the night: the Red Army's Player of the Year, the Members' Player of the Year, the Golden Boot, and the Rising Star awards. Harry Crawford, Panagiotis Kikianis, and Ryan White also won awards.

Award	Recipient	Ref
Aurelio Vidmar Medal	(Australia) Ethan Alagich	
Players' Player of the Year	(Australia) Panagiotis Kikianis	
Red Army's Player of the Year	(Australia) Archie Goodwin	
Members' Player of the Year	(Australia) Archie Goodwin	
Golden Boot	(Australia) Archie Goodwin	
Rising Star	(Australia) Archie Goodwin	
Youth Player of the Year	(Australia) Harry Crawford	
Youth Player of the Year	(Australia) Ryan White	

=== Player of the month ===
Month	Player
November	(England) Zach Clough
December	(Australia) Archie Goodwin
January	(Australia) Ethan Alagich
February	(Australia) Ethan Alagich
March	(Australia) Harry Crawford
April	
