= List of Adelaide United FC players (25–99 appearances) =

Adelaide United Football Club, an association football club based in Adelaide, South Australia, was founded in 2003. They became the first southern member admitted into the A-League in 2005, having spent their first and last season participating in the National Soccer League. The club's first team have competed in numerous nationally and internationally organised competitions, and all players who have played between 25 and 99 such matches, either as a member of the starting eleven or as a substitute, are listed below.

Each player's details include the duration of his Adelaide United career, his typical playing position while with the club, and the number of games played and goals scored in all senior competitive matches. Two of these players, Carl Veart and Aurelio Vidmar, went on to manage Adelaide United. Paul Izzo fell one short of 100 appearances for Adelaide United. The list includes eight players who are still contracted to the club, and so can add to their totals.

== Key ==
- The list is ordered first by date of debut, and then if necessary in alphabetical order.
- Appearances as a substitute are included.
- Statistics are correct up to and including the match played on 20 November 2026. Where a player left the club permanently after this date, his statistics are updated to his date of leaving.

Positions key
GK	Goalkeeper
DF	Defender
MF	Midfielder
FW	Forward

Nationality
Unless otherwise noted, the nationality of a player is determined by the country/countries which he has played for, or if said person has not played international football, their country of birth.
Position
Playing positions are listed according to the tactical formations that were employed at the time.
Club career
Club career is defined as the first and last calendar years in which the player appeared for the club in any of the competitions listed below.
Total appearances and Total goals
Total appearances and goals comprise those in the National Soccer League, A-League Men, FFA Cup, Pre-Season Challenge Cup, AFC Champions League and FIFA Club World Cup.

== Players ==
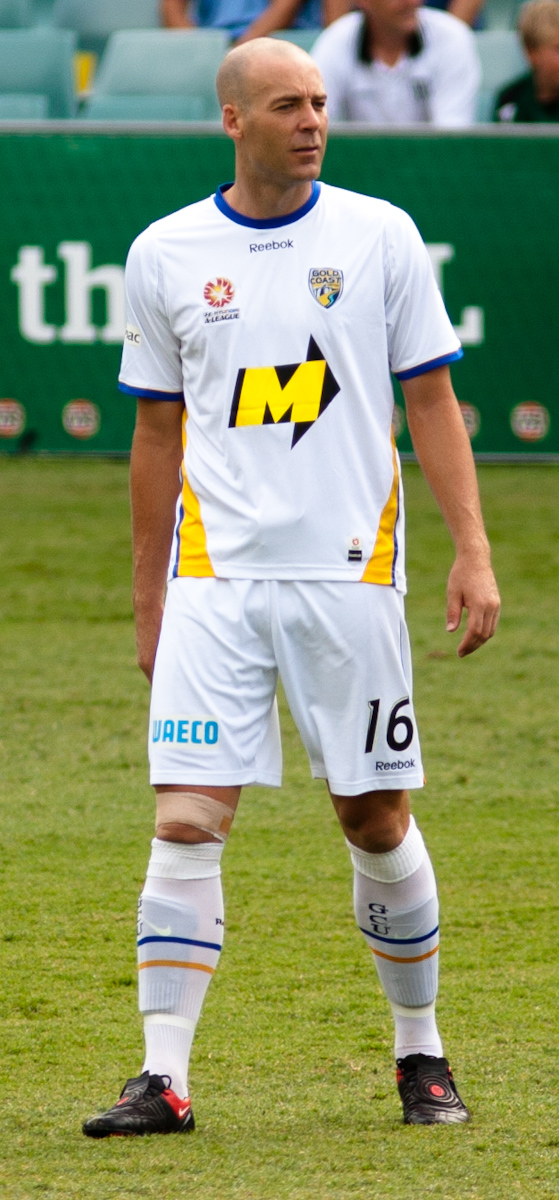
Kristian Rees played 73 times, scoring three goals since the club's foundation.

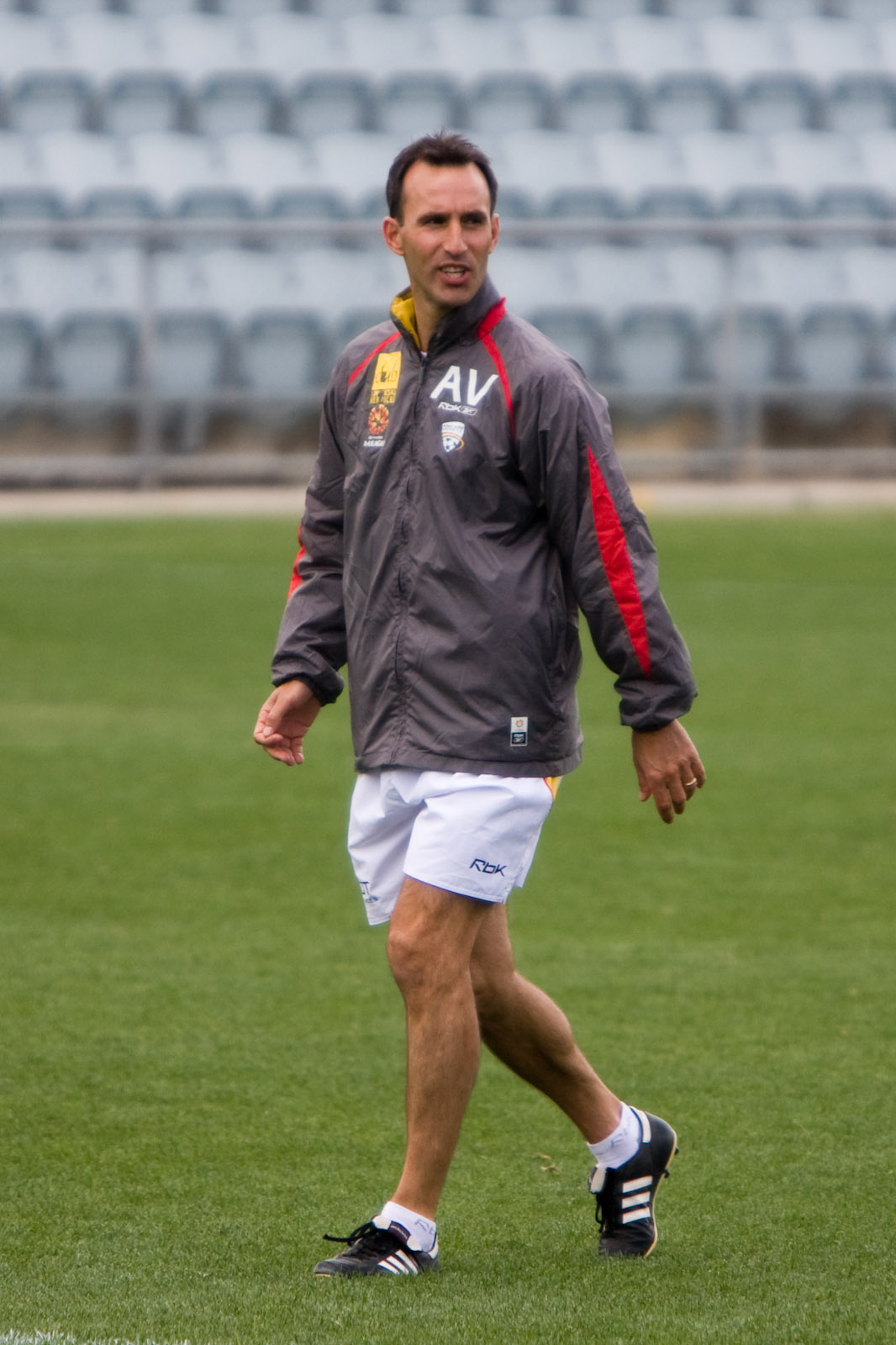
Aurelio Vidmar made 29 appearances for Adelaide United was the club's manager from 2007 to 2010.

Players highlighted in bold are still actively playing for Adelaide United.

List of Adelaide United players with between 25 and 99 appearances
Player	Nationality	Pos	Club career	Starts	Subs	Total	Goals
Player	Nationality	Pos	Club career	Appearances			Goals
Ross Aloisi	Australia	MF	2003–2004; 2005–2007	83	0	83	8
Aaron Goulding	Australia	DF	2003–2007	55	7	62	0
Matthew Kemp	Australia	DF	2003–2007	47	11	58	2
Kristian Rees	Australia	DF	2003–2004; 2005–2007	60	13	73	3
Carl Veart	Australia	FW	2003–2007	85	3	88	25
Aurelio Vidmar	Australia	MF	2003–2005	29	0	29	2
Robert Bajic	Australia	GK	2003–2004; 2006–2008	46	2	48	0
Daniel Beltrame	Australia	GK	2005–2009	39	1	40	0
Qu Shengqing	China	FW	2005–2006; 2006	26	6	32	8
Fernando Rech	Brazil	FW	2005–2007	41	2	43	16
Greg Owens	Australia	MF	2006–2007	18	11	29	4
Jason Spagnuolo	Australia	FW	2006–2009	37	32	69	1
Nathan Burns	Australia	FW	2006–2008	43	11	54	11
Bobby Petta	Netherlands	FW	2006–2008	17	9	26	2
Diego Walsh	Brazil	MF	2007–2008	41	4	45	5
Jonas Salley	Ivory Coast	MF	2007–2009	36	12	48	0
Kristian Sarkies	Australia	MF	2007–2009	36	8	44	3
Sasa Ognenovski	Australia	DF	2008–2009	36	0	36	3
Alemão	Brazil	DF	2008–2010	28	14	42	3
Cristiano	Brazil	FW	2008–2010	42	18	60	15
Scott Jamieson	Australia	DF	2008–2010	63	4	67	0
Daniel Mullen	Australia	DF	2008–2012	66	13	79	5
Paul Reid	Australia	MF	2008–2011	65	5	70	3
Iain Fyfe	Australia	DF	2009–2013	83	3	86	5
Adam Hughes	Australia	MF	2009–2011	49	12	61	1
Mathew Leckie	Australia	FW	2009–2011	31	10	41	10
Evan Kostopoulos	Australia	FW	2010–2013	18	13	31	3
Marcos Flores	Argentina	MF	2010–2011	37	1	38	9
Sergio van Dijk	Indonesia	FW	2010–2012; 2016	62	9	71	29
Iain Ramsay	Philippines	MF	2010–2013; 2014	61	32	93	13
Francisco Usucar	Uruguay	MF	2011–2012	24	10	34	0
Zenon Caravella	Australia	MF	2011–2013	29	8	37	1
Jon McKain	Australia	MF	2011–2014	51	5	56	1
Dario Vidošić	Australia	MF	2011–2013	59	1	60	15
Antony Golec	Australia	DF	2011–2014	26	2	28	2
Jeronimo Neumann	Argentina	FW	2012–2014	32	21	53	17
Fábio Ferreira	Portugal	FW	2012–2015	39	15	54	13
Paul Izzo	Australia	GK	2012–2015; 2017–2020	99	0	99	0
Awer Mabil	Australia	FW	2013–2015	16	36	52	9
Tomi Juric	Australia	FW	2013; 2020–2021	21	4	25	11
Nathan Konstandopoulos	Australia	MF	2014–2016; 2017–2021; 2022	35	43	78	7
James Jeggo	Australia	MF	2014–2016	50	1	51	4
Bruce Kamau	Australia	FW	2014–2016	12	20	32	3
Dylan McGowan	Australia	DF	2014–2017	89	7	96	9
Mark Ochieng	Australia	FW	2014–2018	8	26	34	2
Pablo Sanchez	Spain	FW	2014–2016	29	28	57	19
Ben Warland	Australia	DF	2014–2018; 2022–2024	39	11	50	3
Iacopo La Rocca	Italy	MF	2015–2017	30	3	33	0
George Mells	Australia	MF	2015–2017	14	17	31	0
Riley McGree	Australia	MF	2016–2017; 2019–2020	45	6	51	15
Ben Garuccio	Australia	DF	2016–2018	55	5	60	1
Jordan O'Doherty	Australia	MF	2016–2018	23	13	36	2
Taylor Regan	Australia	DF	2016–2018	25	12	37	0
Baba Diawara	Senegal	FW	2017–2019	23	13	36	9
Lachlan Brook	Australia	MF	2017–2020; 2022	19	10	29	1
Vince Lia	Australia	MF	2017–2020	27	16	43	3
Daniel Adlung	Germany	MF	2017–2018	28	0	28	6
Ryan Strain	Australia	DF	2017–2021	82	8	90	0
Mirko Boland	Germany	MF	2018–2020	23	5	28	2
Scott Galloway	Australia	DF	2018–2019	34	0	34	1
Michael Jakobsen	Denmark	DF	2018–2022	94	1	95	1
Al Hassan Toure	Australia	FW	2019–2021	16	20	36	7
Mohamed Toure	Australia	FW	2020–2022	8	36	44	7
Kusini Yengi	Australia	FW	2020–2022	15	13	28	6
James Delianov	Australia	GK	2020–2025	60	0	60	0
Joe Caletti	Australia	MF	2020–2022	15	18	33	0
Yaya Dukuly	Australia	FW	2020–2022; 2024–2026	37	32	69	6
**Jonny Yull**	Australia	MF	2021–	52	37	89	5
Javi López	Spain	DF	2021–2025	87	13	100	4
Joshua Cavallo	Australia	MF	2021–2025	32	23	55	0
Joe Gauci	Australia	GK	2021–2024	76	0	76	0
Juande	Spain	MF	2021–2023	42	11	53	1
Bernardo Oliveira	Australia	MF	2021–2024	16	23	39	5
Nick Ansell	Australia	DF	2021–2024	24	5	29	1
Nestor Irankunda	Australia	FW	2022–2024	18	43	61	16
Lachlan Barr	Australia	DF	2022–2024	33	6	39	3
Hiroshi Ibusuki	Japan	FW	2022–2024	59	15	74	30
Zach Clough	England	MF	2022–2025	85	8	93	22
Alexandar Popovic	Australia	DF	2022–2024	43	2	45	2
Luka Jovanovic	Australia	FW	2022–2026	47	37	84	25
Panashe Madanha	Australia	MF	2022–2026	10	28	38	0
**Luke Duzel**	Australia	MF	2023–	22	31	53	2
**Jay Barnett**	Australia	MF	2023–	55	11	66	2
Ryan Tunnicliffe	England	MF	2023–2025	10	17	27	1
Austin Ayoubi	Lebanon	FW	2024–2026	13	26	39	5
**Panagiotis Kikianis**	Australia	DF	2024–	67	0	67	5
**Dylan Pierias**	Australia	FW	2024–	35	2	37	5
**Ryan White**	Australia	MF	2024–	27	23	50	3
**Ben Folami**	Australia	FW	2024–	13	18	31	1
Archie Goodwin	Australia	FW	2024–2025	19	7	26	13
**Bart Vriends**	Netherlands	DF	2024–	49	0	49	2
**Harry Crawford**	Australia	FW	2024–	13	12	25	2
**Joshua Smits**	Netherlands	GK	2025–	38	0	38	0
**Juan Muñiz**	Spain	MF	2025–	23	12	35	4
