= List of Adelaide United FC club award winners =

The Adelaide United FC awards night is held annually and recognises the football club's best and fairest players as viewed by the club, the media, its coaches and its players.

== Aurelio Vidmar Medal ==
The most prestigious award and highest accolade to be bestowed upon a player. The award goes to a player who has consistently made a significant and positive difference to the team’s performance during the games played, represented the club in an exemplary way, portrayed a totally professional attitude to everything he did on and off the park and personifies the vision of the club.

Season	Player
2003–04	(Australia) Richie Alagich
2005–06	(Australia) Carl Veart
2006–07	(Australia) Jason Spagnuolo
2007–08	(Brazil) Cássio
2008–09	(Australia) Eugene Galeković
2009–10	(Australia) Eugene Galeković
2010–11	(Brazil) Cássio
2011–12	(Australia) Zenon Caravella
2012–13	(Australia) Dario Vidošić
2013–14	(Spain) Isaías
2014–15	(Spain) Sergio Cirio
2015–16	(Australia) Craig Goodwin
2016–17	(Spain) Isaías
2017–18	(Spain) Isaías
2018–19	(Spain) Isaías
2019–20	(Australia) Riley McGree
2020–21	(Australia) Ben Halloran
2021–22	(Australia) Craig Goodwin
2022–23	(Australia) Craig Goodwin
2023–24	(England) Zach Clough
2024–25	(Australia) Ethan Alagich
2025–26	(Australia) Ryan White

== Player’s Player (Men's) ==
Voted by his team mates to be consistently the most valuable player on the park, set standards on and off the park that all players in the team aspire to and best exemplify their ideal type of player.

Season	Player
2003–04	(Australia) Richie Alagich
2005–06	(Australia) Michael Valkanis
2006–07	(Australia) Jason Spagnuolo
2007–08	(Brazil) Cássio
2008–09	(Australia) Eugene Galeković
2009–10	(Australia) Eugene Galeković
2010–11	(Argentina) Marcos Flores
2011–12	(Australia) Eugene Galeković
2012–13	(Australia) Eugene Galeković
2013–14	(Argentina) Marcelo Carrusca
2014–15	(Australia) Tarek Elrich
2015–16	
2016–17
2017–18
2018–19
2019–20	(Australia) Paul Izzo
2020–21	(Australia) Jordan Elsey
2021–22	(Australia) Craig Goodwin
2022–23	(Australia) Craig Goodwin
2023–24	(Japan) Hiroshi Ibusuki
2024–25	(Australia) Panagiotis Kikianis
2025–26	(Australia) Ethan Alagich

== Members' Player of the Year (Men's) ==
Season	Player
2020–21	(Australia) Ryan Strain
2021–22	(Australia) Craig Goodwin
2022–23	(Australia) Louis D'Arrigo
2023–24	(Japan) Hiroshi Ibusuki
2024–25	(Australia) Archie Goodwin
2025–26	(Australia) Ryan Kitto

== Red Army Player of the Year (Men's) ==
Season	Player
2022–23	(Australia) Ryan Kitto
2023–24	(Australia) Nestory Irankunda
2024–25	(Australia) Archie Goodwin
2025-26	(Australia) Ethan Alagich

== Rising Star (Men's) ==
A young player voted by the coaches to have made a significant impact over the season, demonstrated the greatest growth in their development as a professional player and promises the greatest potential growth as a professional player.

Season	Player
2003–04	(Australia) Aaron Goulding
2005–06	(Australia) Adam van Dommele
2006–07	(Australia) Nathan Burns
2007–08	(Australia) Bruce Djite
2008–09	(Australia) Scott Jamieson
2009–10	(Australia) Mathew Leckie
2010–11	(Australia) Iain Ramsay
2011–12	(Australia) Osama Malik
2012–13	(Australia) Awer Mabil
2013–14	(Australia) Jordan Elsey
2014–15	(Australia) James Jeggo
2015–16	(Australia) Stefan Mauk
2016–17	(Australia) Riley McGree
2017–18	(Australia) Nathan Konstandopoulos
2018–19	(Australia) Ryan Strain
2019–20	(Australia) Louis D'Arrigo
2020–21	(Australia) Josh Cavallo
2021–22	(Australia) Bernardo and (Australia) Alexandar Popovic
2022–23	(Australia) Nestory Irankunda and (Australia) Ethan Alagich
2023–24	(Australia) Giuseppe Bovalina
2024–25	(Australia) Archie Goodwin
2025–26	(Australia) Jonny Yull

== Most Valuable Player (Youth Men's) ==
The player who consistently made a significant and positive difference to the team’s performance during the games played and portrayed a totally professional attitude.

Season	Player
2008–09	Michael Marrone
2009–10	Dane Milovanovic
2010–11	Allan Welsh
2011–12	Jordan Elsey
2012–13	Awer Mabil
2013–14	Dion Kirk
2014–15	Oliver Zafaridis
2015–16	Ruon Tongyik
2016–17	Daniel Margush
2017–18	Isaac Richards and Charlie Devereux
2018–19	Carlo Armiento and Louis D'Arrigo
2019–20	Lachlan Brook and Taras Gomulka
2020–21	Jonny Yull
2021–22	Ethan Alagich
2022–23	Luka Jovanovic
2023–24	Panagiotis Kikianis
2023–24	Harry Crawford & Ryan White

== Dianne Alagich Medal – W-League ==
The player who consistently made a significant and positive difference to the team’s performance during the games played and portrayed a totally professional attitude.

Season	Player
2008–09	(Australia) Dianne Alagich
2009–10	(Australia) Racheal Quigley
2010–11	(United States) Ashleigh Gunning
2011–12	(New Zealand) Abby Erceg
2012–13	(New Zealand) Abby Erceg
2013–14	(Australia) Jenna McCormick
2014	(Australia) Kristy Moore
2015–16	(United States) Abby Dahlkemper
2016–17	(United States) Sofia Huerta
2017–18	(United States) Alyssa Mautz
2018–19	(United States) Amber Brooks
2019–20	(United States) Mallory Weber
2020–21	(Netherlands) Maruschka Waldus
2021–22	(England) Fiona Worts
2022–23	(Australia) Dylan Holmes
2023–24	(Japan) Nanako Sasaki
2023–24	(United States) Erin Healy
2025–26	(Australia) Ella Tonkin

== Rising Star - A-League Women ==
Season	Player
2018–19	(Australia) Charli Grant
2019–20	(Australia) Chelsie Dawber
2020–21	(Australia) Matilda McNamara
2021–22	(Japan) Nanako Sasaki
2022–23	(Australia) Annalee Grove
2023–24	(Australia) Ella Tonkin
2024–25	(Australia) Zoe Tolland
2025–26	(Australia) Ilona Melegh

== Player’s Player - W-League ==
Season	Player
2019–20	(United States) Mallory Weber
2020–21	(Netherlands) Maruschka Waldus
2021–22	(England) Fiona Worts
2022–23	(Netherlands) Maruschka Waldus
2023–24	(Australia) Emily Hodgson
2024–25	(Australia) Ella Tonkin
2025–26	(Australia) Ella Tonkin

== Members' Player of the Year -W-League ==
Season	Player
2020–21	(Australia) Charlotte Grant
2021–22	(England) Fiona Worts
2022–23	(Australia) Annalee Grove
2023–24	(Australia) Emily Hodgson
2024–25	(United States) Erin Healy
2025–26	(Australia) Emily Condon

== Red Army Player of the Year -W-League ==
Season	Player
2022–23	(Australia) Annalee Grove
2023–24	(Japan) Nanako Sasaki
2024–25	(New Zealand) Claudia Jenkins
2025–26	(Republic of Ireland) Erin Healy

== Remo Paris Club Person ==
Awarded to the person who most epitomises the values and ideals of Adelaide United, on or off the pitch.

Season	Player
2003–04	(Australia) Michael Valkanis
2005–06	(Australia) Matthew Kemp
2006–07	(Australia) Robert Cornthwaite
2007–08	(Australia) Shaun Ontong
2008–09	(Australia) Fabian Barbiero
2009–10	(Australia) Fabian Barbiero
2010–11	(Australia) Adam Hughes
2011–12	(Australia) Nigel Boogaard
2012–13	(Australia) Bruce Djite
2013–14	(Australia) Osama Malik
2014–15	(Australia) Tarek Elrich
2015–16	(Australia) Tarek Elrich
2016–17	(Australia) Peter Blazincic
2017–18	Peter Duke
2018–19	Will Cutts
2019–20	Colin Varacalli
2020–21	Ivan Karlovic
2021–22	Fabrizio Petrone
2022–23	(Australia) Ryan Kitto and Eleni Vosnakis
2023–24
2024–25	Frankie Queale and Marius Zanin
2025–26	(Australia) Dylan Holmes
