= The Original Rivalry =

Prominent rivalry in Australian soccer

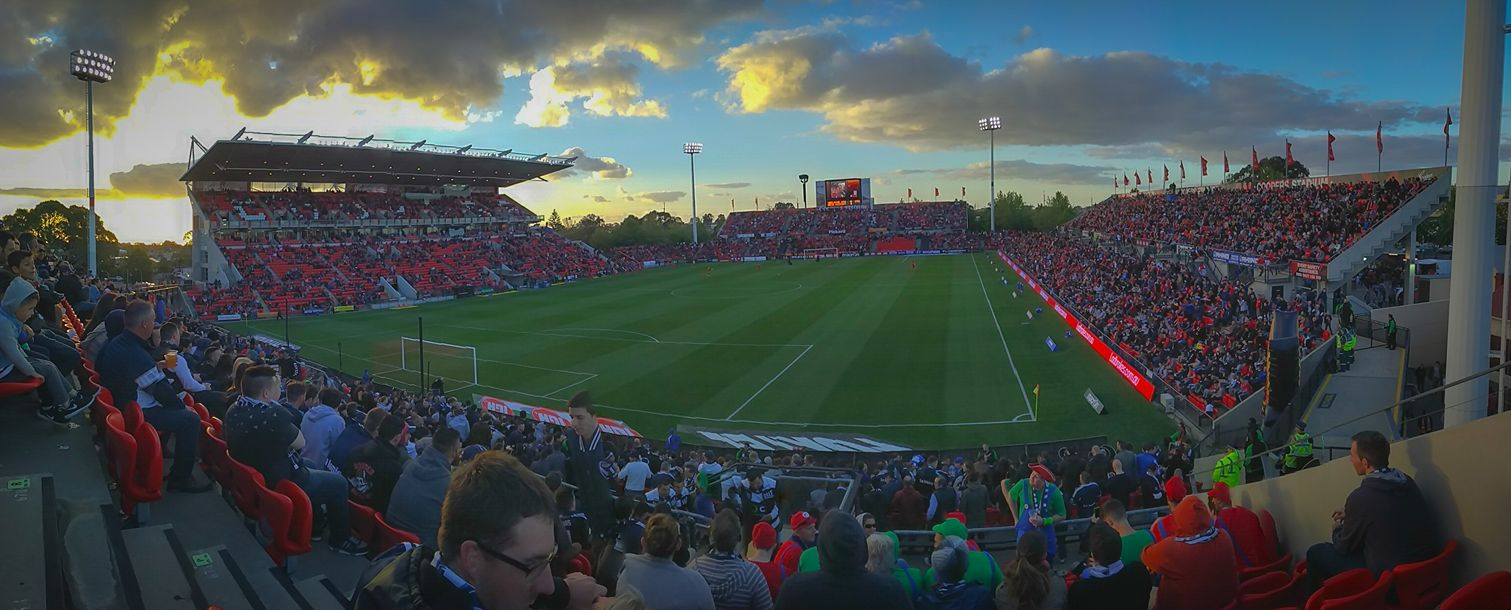
- Panorama of Hindmarsh Stadium from the away end during an Original Rivalry match in 2016
- Teams: Adelaide United; Melbourne Victory
- First meeting: 7 May 2005; OFC Club Championship qualification United 0–0 (4–1 p) Victory
- Latest meeting: 27 February 2026; A-League Men; Victory 1–1 United
- Stadiums: Hindmarsh Stadium; Melbourne Rectangular Stadium

Statistics
- Total meetings: 78
- Most wins: Melbourne Victory (35)
- Top scorer: Archie Thompson; 13 goals
- All-time record: Adelaide United: 25; Drawn: 18; Melbourne Victory: 35
- Largest victory: Melbourne Victory 6–0 Adelaide United (18 February 2007)
- Longest win streak: 10 games Melbourne Victory (12 September 2008 – 29 October 2010)
- Longest unbeaten streak: 10 games Melbourne Victory (12 September 2008 – 29 October 2010)

The Original Rivalry is a rivalry between South Australian-based club Adelaide United and Victorian-based club Melbourne Victory. It is also referred to as 'The Original Derby'.

== History ==
=== Early matches (2005–2006) ===
The two teams first met in a 2005 Australian Club World Championship Qualifying Tournament match on 7 May 2005 with Adelaide progressing to the next round of qualifying, winning a penalty shootout after the match remained 0–0 after extra time. The teams met again in a friendly match on 26 June 2005 in Bendigo, with the teams finishing 0–0 at full time.

=== Beginning of rivalry (2007–2009) ===
However, a proper rivalry between the two teams did not begin until 2010, when Adelaide United were defeated twice in an A-League Grand Final both in 2007 and 2009. In the 2007 Grand Final in front of a sold-out crowd of 55,436 at the Telstra Dome Victory would defeat Adelaide 6-0 with 5 of the goals scored by Archie Thompson. On top of the scoreline, in the 34th minute, Adelaide captain, Ross Aloisi, was given a second yellow card. During the 2008–09 season, they both finished on the top of the ladder equal on both points and the goal difference. The rivalry between both sets of fans remains very strong, since the majority of the matches get an attendance of at least over 12,500.

In 2009, Melbourne Victory would once again win the Grand Final, claiming a hard-fought 1–0 win in front of 53,273. The match, however, was marred by controversy, as Adelaide United striker, Cristiano, was given a straight red card in the 10th minute. Cristiano was adjudged to have elbowed Rodrigo Vargas whilst contesting an aerial ball. Former Socceroo, Robbie Slater, remarked that he "thought it was a disgraceful decision and the Grand Final was ruined", whilst calling for Football Federation Australia to appoint international referees for the sake of neutrality. The sending off of Danny Allsopp was also controversial, as he was given a straight red for an apparent headbutt during an altercation with Robert Cornthwaite.

Another event that helped start the rivalry was in the 2006-07 season on the field included at the time Adelaide coach John Kosmina and Melbourne Victory Captain Kevin Muscat. The ball rolled out near the Adelaide technical area, Kosmina went to pick up the ball, only to be pushed to the ground by Muscat also trying to retrieve the ball himself. Kosmina responded by getting to his feet and grabbing the Victory captain by the throat. Kosmina was sent off by referee, Matthew Breeze, and was later handed a five game suspension. It’s an incident that has set the tone for what has followed in this fiery fixture.

=== 2010s ===
Following the Grand Final, Victory now had six consecutive wins against Adelaide. During the 2009–10 season, The Reds plummeted down the table, claiming the wooden spoon. Melbourne continued their form, finishing second on the ladder, losing out to Sydney on the final day. Melbourne took a clean sweep of derbies during the season: winning 2–0 in Adelaide, 3–1 at Docklands, and 2–0 at home to momentarily go top of the table. Victory extended their streak to ten consecutive wins in October 2010, coming from behind to win 2–1. Adelaide finally broke Victory's streak with a 4–1 win in Melbourne in January 2011, their first win against them in almost three years, and their equal largest win in the fixture. Adelaide would beat Victory again on the final day to secure third spot, and qualification for the Champions League. The 2011–12 season saw both clubs drop into the bottom half of the ladder.

=== 2020s ===
In March 2021, Adelaide United striker, Kusini Yengi, was subject to racial abuse from some Victory fans online after scoring in their 3–1 win. In January 2022, Melbourne Victory were fined $5,000 after some of their fans directed homophobic abuse at Adelaide United player, Josh Cavallo, during a game earlier that month.

Following the release of the 2023–24 A-League Men fixtures, Adelaide Venue Management, the company that own and operate Coopers Stadium, announced that Melbourne Victory supporters would not be allowed into the ground for the round 20 match, due to the incident in last year's Melbourne Derby, and previous incidents between Adelaide and Victory supporters. They backtracked a few hours later, deleting the announcement and publicly stating that the decision had been reversed. The CEO of AVM, Anthony Kirchner, was stood down three days later, and sacked in late September.

During a match on 4 November 2023, in the fifth minute of stoppage time with the scores level, Adelaide player, Nestory Irankunda, received the ball on the right wing. Victory player, Chris Ikonomidis, pulled his shirt and bumped him to the ground, causing Irankunda to lash out after a foul wasn't given. The referee, Alex King, sent Irankunda off with a second yellow card. Former Adelaide United player, Bruce Djite, called the sending off an "absolute joke", stating that the referees "need to get their act together" and should be "protecting the hottest, brightest prospects in Australian football." Former Victory forward, Archie Thompson, agreed with Djite's comments, adding that "the linesman should've been helping (Alex) King, because the players were right in front of him." Adelaide coach, Carl Veart, said that "Nestor has to be better" and that "he has to learn to be able to control them (his frustrations) a little bit better." Veart stated that he asked King why he didn't give the foul, and that the referee said that "he told him, he has to be stronger."

=== Cup knockouts and title deciders ===
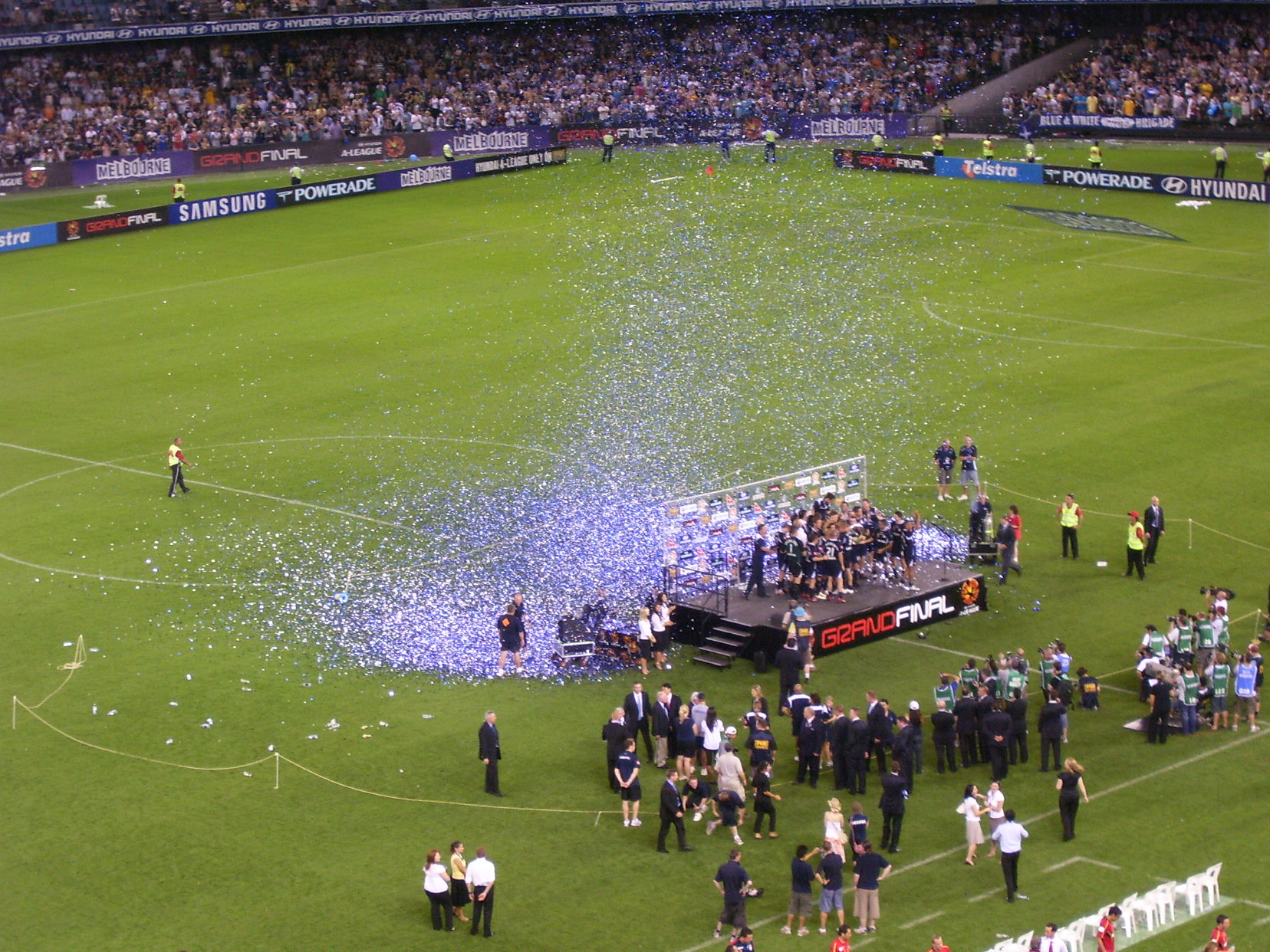
Melbourne Victory celebrating after the 2007 A-League Grand Final.

Adelaide and Melbourne have met twice in an A-League Grand Final, there have also been Original Rivalry games in the FFA Cup which have significantly contributed to one of the two clubs winning a trophy. These include:

- Melbourne Victory 6–0 Adelaide United (18 February 2007) The Grand Final match of the 2006–07 league campaign, with both Adelaide and Melbourne to reach their first A-League Finals trophy. The game had most goals and largest victory in an A-League Grand Final with Archie Thompson scoring five goals and Kristian Sarkies scoring the sixth goal in the third minute of stoppage time.
- Melbourne Victory 1–0 Adelaide United (28 February 2009) The Grand Final match of the 2008–09 league campaign, with Adelaide and Melbourne facing each other at Telstra Dome again since the 2007 A-League Grand Final. The final result was a 1–0 scoreline with Tom Pondeljak scoring the goal in the 60th minute.
- Melbourne Victory 3–1 Adelaide United (22 September 2015) The FFA Cup Quarter-Finals match to face Hume City next round. After seven minutes, Osama Malik had slid in to Fahid Ben Khalfallah who had given Victory a free kick. Guilherme Finkler opened the scoring after ten minutes via the free-kick. Kosta Barbarouses scored the second just before the half-time whistle. Adelaide had earned a penalty as Daniel Georgievski had fouled Craig Goodwin. Marcelo Carrusca the penalty taker had successfully converted spot-kick as Lawrence Thomas dived correctly. Besart Berisha had also scored his penalty with ten minutes to go, booking them to the cup semi-final against Hume City.
- Adelaide United 3–0 Melbourne Victory (23 August 2017) The FFA Cup Round of 16 match to face Heidelberg United next round. No goals were scored in the first half until Johan Absalonsen scored the opener in the 53rd. Ten minutes later, a penalty was awarded via a handball by Rhys Williams. The penalty was successfully converted by George Blackwood sending Melbourne Victory goalkeeper Lawrence Thomas the wrong way. Nathan Konstandopoulos in the final minute of regular time scored his first FFA Cup goal. After, stoppage time was up. The Reds moved on in the quarter-finals to face Heidelberg United in Melbourne.
- Melbourne Victory 1–0 Adelaide United (21 September 2024) In 2024 the two sides would face each other in the 2024 Australia Cup Semi Finals. the match would be played at AAMI Park in front of 5,131 in attendance. The two sides fought hard in the first half. in the 30th minute Adama Traore had a close chance for Victory but his shot was saved and deflected for a corner. Adelaide then looked to break the deadlock on a dangerous counter-attack, but Jack Duncan was up to the task after being forced into a double save to keep the scores locked at 0–0. the half would finish 0–0. Both sides would continue to fight hard into the second half but only one side would score. In the 88th minute Jordi Valadon would score the winner for Victory. Melbourne Victory advanced to the Australia Cup final against Macarthur FC. Macarthur FC would defeat Victory 1–0 in Melbourne.

== Results ==
=== Adelaide United vs. Melbourne Victory ===
Venue	Date	Competition	Score	Home goalscorers	Away goalscorers	Attendance
Hindmarsh Stadium	7 May 2005	OFC Club Championship qualification	0–0 (a.e.t.) (4–1 pen.)			7,254
Hindmarsh Stadium	9 September 2005	A-League	1–0	Brain 1'		8,785
Hindmarsh Stadium	5 January 2006	A-League	1–0	Dodd 14'		13,427
Hindmarsh Stadium	1 December 2006	A-League	1–3	Fernando 42'	Muscat 16' (pen.), Allsopp 61', Fred 86'	16,378
Hindmarsh Stadium	28 January 2007	A-League Finals	0–0			15,575
Hindmarsh Stadium	7 September 2007	A-League	1–1	Dodd 83' (pen.)	Vargas 80'	12,231
Hindmarsh Stadium	12 October 2007	A-League	4–1	Milicevic 14' (o.g.), Dodd (2) 15', 54', Pantelis 90'	Thompson 45'	13,372
Hindmarsh Stadium	31 October 2008	A-League	2–3	Dodd 28' (pen.), Cássio 67'	Muscat 55' (pen.), 81' (pen.), Celeski 84'	13,191
Hindmarsh Stadium	7 February 2009	A-League Finals	0–2		Hernández 13', Allsopp 89'	14,119
Hindmarsh Stadium	18 September 2009	A-League	0–2		Ward 7', Brebner 90'	15,038
Adelaide Oval	11 February 2011	A-League	2–1	Reid 6', Dodd 78'	Thompson 65'	21,083
Hindmarsh Stadium	14 October 2011	A-League	1–0	Van Dijk 52'		14,573
Hindmarsh Stadium	7 December 2012	A-League	4–2	Kostopoulos (2) 3', 32', F. Ferreira 22', Carrusca 25'	Nabbout 6', Rojas 47'	14,115
Hindmarsh Stadium	8 February 2013	A-League	1–0	Jerónimo 43'		12,029
Hindmarsh Stadium	18 October 2013	A-League	2–2	Cirio 21' (pen.), Jerónimo 25'	Finkler 79', Troisi 90+3'	16,504
Adelaide Oval	17 October 2014	A-League	1–1	Cirio 85'	Khalfallah 89'	33,126
Hindmarsh Stadium	21 March 2015	A-League	2–2	Sánchez 43', McGowan 75'	Khalfallah 9', Thompson 77'	16,077
Adelaide Oval	9 October 2015	A-League	0–0			19,079
Hindmarsh Stadium	22 October 2016	A-League	1–2	Elrich 68'	Berisha 20', Rojas 90+3'	14,908
Hindmarsh Stadium	7 January 2017	A-League	0–2		Troisi 22', Berisha 68'	10,036
Marden Sports Complex	23 August 2017	FFA Cup	3–0	Absalonsen 53', Blackwood 66' (pen.), N. Konstandopoulos 89'		3,342
Adelaide Oval	20 October 2017	A-League	2–2	Lia (2) 23', 62'	Berisha 13', Austin 82'	19,415
Hindmarsh Stadium	9 January 2019	A-League	2–0	C. Goodwin 18', Ilsø 21'		12,115
Hindmarsh Stadium	19 April 2019	A-League	1–0	Blackwood 81'		12,866
Hindmarsh Stadium	23 November 2019	A-League	3–1	McGree (2) 23', 68', Maria 63'	Toivonen 61'	12,198
Hindmarsh Stadium	17 January 2020	A-League	1–0	Halloran 32'		11,412
Hindmarsh Stadium	23 January 2021	A-League	1–0	M. Toure 53'		8,133
Hindmarsh Stadium	11 December 2021	A-League Men	1–2	Spiranovic 70' (o.g.)	Margiotta 59', Velupillay 78'	8,145
Hindmarsh Stadium	5 January 2022	FFA Cup	1–2	C. Goodwin 33'	Brillante 62', Margiotta 79' (pen.)	3,156
Hindmarsh Stadium	2 April 2022	A-League Men	0–1		Rojas 7'	8,044
Hindmarsh Stadium	11 November 2022	A-League Men	3–0	Ibusuki 37', C. Goodwin 86' (pen.), Warland 90+1'		13,504
Hindmarsh Stadium	14 January 2023	A-League Men	1–1	C. Goodwin 7'	D'Agostino 49'	11,168
Hindmarsh Stadium	9 March 2024	A-League Men	2–1	Irankunda 51'	Fornaroli (2) 33', 57' (pen.)	8,731
Hindmarsh Stadium	18 January 2025	A-League Men	3–2	Mauk 31', Miranda 45' (o.g.), E. Alagich 71'	Teague 18', Santos 66'	14,131
Hindmarsh Stadium	17 January 2026	A-League Men	2–1	C. Goodwin 6', Kitto 90+7'	Grimaldi 75'	14,784

=== Melbourne Victory vs. Adelaide United ===
Venue	Date	Competition	Score	Home goalscorers	Away goalscorers	Attendance
Olympic Park	8 August 2005	Pre-Season Challenge Cup	0–0			4,687
Olympic Park	28 October 2005	A-League	0–1		Veart 83'	16,201
Aurora Stadium	16 July 2006	Pre-Season Challenge Cup	0–1		Veart 65'	6,834
Olympic Park	25 August 2006	A-League	2–0	Muscat 29', Claudinho 78'		15,781
Docklands Stadium	15 October 2006	A-League	0–1		Owens 83'	32,368
Docklands Stadium	4 February 2007	A-League Finals	2–1	Allsopp 48', Robinson 90+2'	Dodd 4'	47,413
Docklands Stadium	18 February 2007	A-League Finals	6–0	Thompson (5) 21', 29', 40', 56', 73', Sarkies 90+3'		55,436
Aurora Stadium	15 July 2007	Pre-Season Challenge Cup	1–1	Allsopp 74'	Dodd 9'	8,061
Docklands Stadium	8 December 2007	A-League	2–2	Muscat 71' (pen.), R. Alagich 90' (o.g.)	Agostino (2) 18', 50'	22,466
Aurora Stadium	20 July 2008	Pre-Season Challenge Cup	1–2	Ney Fabiano 8'	Cristiano (2) 21', 90'	4,720
Docklands Stadium	12 September 2008	A-League	1–0	Muscat 63'		24,812
Docklands Stadium	6 January 2009	A-League	1–0	Ward 58'		27,196
Docklands Stadium	14 February 2009	A-League Finals	4–0	Thompson 10', Hernández 24', Allsopp 44', Pondeljak 48'		34,476
Docklands Stadium	28 February 2009	A-League Finals	1–0	Pondeljak 60'		53,273
Docklands Stadium	24 October 2009	A-League	3–1	Dugandzic (2) 18', 56', Leijer 90'	Hughes 64'	21,182
Docklands Stadium	23 January 2010	A-League	2–0	Pondeljak 1', Muscat 90' (pen.)		20,351
Docklands Stadium	29 October 2010	A-League	2–1	Kruse 22', Hernández 68'	Fyfe 2'	16,269
AAMI Park	9 January 2011	A-League	1–4	Dugandzic 90+4'	Flores 12', Van Dijk (2) 57', 78', Barbiero 75'	18,558
Docklands Stadium	10 December 2011	A-League	1–1	Thompson 58'	Barbiero 81'	16,562
AAMI Park	13 January 2012	A-League	1–1	Thompson 6'	Van Dijk 53'	20,959
Docklands Stadium	19 October 2012	A-League	2–1	Milligan 52', Rojas 67'	Vidošić 49' (pen.)	19,174
Docklands Stadium	23 November 2013	A-League	3–0	Barbarouses 14', A. Thompson 68, Nichols 76'		20,064
AAMI Park	22 February 2014	A-League	4–3	Finkler (2) 15', 56', A. Thompson 66', Barbarouses 75'	Cirio (3) 3', 45', 83'	18,341
AAMI Park	28 November 2014	A-League	3–2	Boogaard 7' (o.g.), Cirio 16' (o.g.), Broxham 32'	Mabil 14', Carrusca 37'	22,334
AAMI Park	22 September 2015	FFA Cup	3–1	Finkler 10', Barbarouses 45+1', Berisha 82' (pen.)	Carrusca 78' (pen.)	10,521
Docklands Stadium	28 November 2015	A-League	2–1	Berisha 14' (pen.), Bozanic 30'	Carrusca 87' (pen.)	23,415
AAMI Park	19 February 2016	A-League	0–1		Kamau 90'	18,924
AAMI Park	25 February 2017	A-League	2–1	Rojas 66, Berisha 82'	Elrich 90'	19,035
Docklands Stadium	8 December 2017	A-League	1–2	Milligan 56'	Diawara 17', Blackwood 72'	16,778
AAMI Park	24 February 2018	A-League	3–0	Regan 22' (o.g.), George 29', Berisha 59'		18,924
AAMI Park	22 April 2018	A-League Finals	2–1	George 63', Berisha 89'	Mileusnic 57'	15,502
Docklands Stadium	8 December 2018	A-League	2–0	Barbarouses 62', Toivonen 81'		20,629
Docklands Stadium	29 February 2020	A-League	2–1	Rojas 57', Nabbout 90+1'	Opseth 7'	14,414
Docklands Stadium	13 March 2021	A-League	1–3	Brimmer 28'	Mauk (2) 35, 77', Yengi 61'	5,217
AAMI Park	23 May 2021	A-League	0–1		C. Goodwin 39'	5,413
AAMI Park	8 January 2022	A-League Men	1–1	D'Agostino 84'	C. Goodwin 90+1'	6,912
AAMI Park	26 February 2023	A-League Men	1–1	Fornaroli 81' (pen.)	Irankunda 87'	8,838
AAMI Park	4 November 2023	A-League Men	1–1	Fornaroli 28'	Ibusuki 59'	15,229
AAMI Park	30 December 2023	A-League Men	2–0	Machach 73', Fornaroli 90'		15,216
AAMI Park	21 September 2024	Australia Cup	1–0	Valadon 88'		5,131
AAMI Park	29 March 2025	A-League Men	5–3	Arzani (2) 29', 71' (pen.), Velupillay 39', Vergos (2) 88', 90+1'	Yull 12', A. Goodwin 47', Clough 57' (pen.)	10,273
AAMI Park	13 December 2025	A-League Men	2–1	Vergos (2) 24', 46'	Pierias 86'	9,103
AAMI Park	27 February 2026	A-League Men	1–1	Jelacic 26'	Dukuly 35'	11,506

== Statistics ==
=== Head-to-head record ===
As of 27 February 2026

Competition	Matches	Melbourne wins	Draw	Adelaide wins
A-League Men regular season	62	26	14	22
A-League Finals	7	6	1	0
FFA Cup/Australia Cup	4	3	0	1
Pre-Season Challenge Cup	4	0	2	2
OFC Club Championship qualification	1	0	1	0
Total	78	35	18	25

=== Comparative league placings ===
Pos.	06	07	08	09	10	11	12	13	14	15	16	17	18	19	20	21	22	23	24	25	26
1	1	1		1						1	1										
2		2		2	2							2					2				2
3						3		3		3				3				3	3		
4								4	4				4	4			4				4
5			5			5							5			5				5	
6			6						6		6									6	
7	7														7						
8							8												8		
9	—N/a						9					9									
10	—N/a				10										10						
11	—N/a						—N/a											11			
12	—N/a															12					
13	—N/a																				—N/a

== Players who played for both clubs ==
The first player to have played for both clubs was Matthew Kemp who joined Adelaide United in 2005 and Melbourne Victory in 2007.

=== Adelaide United, then Melbourne Victory ===
Name	Pos	Adelaide United			Melbourne Victory		
Name	Pos	Career	Apps	Goals	Career	Apps	Goals
Matthew Kemp	DF	2005–2007	47	1	2007–2012	96	2
Daniel Mullen	DF	2008–2012	79	5	2013	9	0
Marcos Flores	MF	2010–2011	38	9	2012–2013	24	4
Paul Izzo	GK	2011–2015, 2017–2020	99	0	2022–2024	51	0
Tomi Juric	FW	2013, 2020–2021	25	11	2022–2023	7	1
Noah Smith	DF	2020–2021	10	0	2022–2023	7	0
Nathan Konstandopoulos	MF	2014–2016, 2017–2022	77	7	2022–2024	11	0
George Timotheou	DF	2020–2022	22	0	2022–2023	7	0
Bruce Kamau	FW	2014–2016	29	3	2023	9	0
Louis D'Arrigo	MF	2018–2023	106	5	2025–	13	2

=== Melbourne Victory, then Adelaide United ===
Name	Pos	Melbourne Victory			Adelaide United		
Name	Pos	Career	Apps	Goals	Career	Apps	Goals
Vince Lia	MF	2005–2007	31	0	2017–2019	43	3
Kristian Sarkies	MF	2005–2007	45	3	2007–2009	44	3
Eugene Galekovic	GK	2005–2007	22	0	2007–2017	285	0
Joe Keenan	MF	2007	17	0	2010–2011	17	1
Mate Dugandzic	MF	2009–2010	40	8	2015–2016	21	1
James Jeggo	MF	2011–2014	34	3	2014–2016	51	4
Scott Galloway	DF	2013–2016	65	1	2018–2019	34	1
Jesse Makarounas	FW	2013–2016	54	3	2016–2017	13	1
James Troisi	MF	2013–2019	126	32	2019–2020	13	1
Nick Ansell	DF	2012–2017, 2018–2019, 2020–2021	92	1	2021–2024	29	1
Jay Barnett	MF	2019–2023	50	0	2023–	50	1
Ben Folami	FW	2021–2024	99	11	2024–	27	1

== Honours ==
As of 8 February 2022

National Competition	Adelaide United	Melbourne Victory
A-League Premiership	2	3
A-League Championship	1	4
Australia Cup	3	2

== Highest attendances ==
- 55,436 (18 February 2007), Telstra Dome; Melbourne 6–0 Adelaide
- 53,273 (28 February 2009), Telstra Dome; Melbourne 1–0 Adelaide
- 47,413 (4 February 2007), Telstra Dome; Melbourne 2–1 Adelaide
- 33,126 (17 October 2014), Adelaide Oval; Adelaide 1–1 Melbourne
- 32,368 (15 October 2006), Telstra Dome; Melbourne 0–1 Adelaide

== See also ==
- Sports rivalry
