= Austin Ayoubi =

Footballer (born 2004)

Personal information
- Full name: Austin Jake Al Ayoubi
- Date of birth: 27 July 2001 (age 25)
- Place of birth: Ashford, South Australia, Australia
- Height: 1.81 m (5 ft 11 in)
- Position: Winger

Team information
- Current team: West Torrens Birkalla
- Number: 27

Youth career
- 2006–2013: Adelaide Comets
- 2013: West Torrens Birkalla
- 2014–2019: Football SA NTC

Senior career*
Years	Team	Apps	(Gls)
2019–2020	Adelaide City	10	(0)
2020–2021	Othellos Athienou	12	(2)
2021	Adelaide City	8	(0)
2022	West Torrens Birkalla	22	(4)
2023	MetroStars	23	(4)
2024	Adelaide United Youth	7	(3)
2024–2026	Adelaide United	34	(3)
2026–	West Torrens Birkalla	5	(0)

International career^{‡}
2026–	Lebanon	1	(0)
- * Club domestic league appearances and goals as of 11 September 2026 ‡ National team caps and goals as of 4 June 2026

Austin Jake Al Ayoubi (Arabic: أوستن جايك الأيوبي; born 27 July 2001) is a professional footballer who plays as a winger for Australian club West Torrens Birkalla. Born in Australia, he plays for the Lebanon national team.

== Club career ==
=== Semi-professional career ===
A youth product of Adelaide Comets and West Torrens Birkalla, Ayoubi began his career with semi-professional club Adelaide City in the National Premier Leagues South Australia (NPL SA), before moving to Cyprus to join Othellos Athienou in the Second Division in September 2020. Ayoubi returned to Adelaide City in July 2021, after a nine-month spell abroad.

In 2022, Ayoubi signed with newly promoted West Torrens Birkalla, also competing in the NPL SA, who were relegated to State League 1 at the end of the season. He departed the club at the end of the 2022 season and joined fellow-NPL SA side MetroStars for the 2023 season. His performances throughout the season earned him selection in the NPL SA Team of the Year.

=== Adelaide United ===
Following a breakout season at NPL level, Ayoubi signed his first professional contract on 20 November 2023 with Adelaide United in the A-League Men, after a successful trial. He made seven first-team appearances during his debut professional season and was subsequently offered a two-year contract extension in June 2024.

Durning the 2024–25 pre-season, Ayoubi drew attention for his performances in the 2024 Australia Cup and was regarded as a player likely to have a breakout season. He scored his first goal for Adelaide United against Western Sydney Wanderers in a 3–2 Cup win, which helped the team reach the semi-final. He then recorded his first A-League Men goal against the same opponent on 2 November in a 4–3 away victory.

Ayoubi left Adelaide United on 27 May 2026, following the expiration of his contract. He scored five goals in 39 appearances for the club.

=== Return to West Torrens Birkalla ===
In July 2026, Ayoubi returned to West Torrens Birkalla during the 2026 NPL South Australia season.

== International career ==
Ayoubi received his first senior call-up to the Lebanon national team in May 2026, ahead of Lebanon's 2027 AFC Asian Cup qualification game against Yemen on 4 June. He made his debut on 4 June, as a second-half substitute in a 2–0 defeat to Yemen.

== Personal life ==
Ayoubi's father, Amin, is the chairman of West Torrens Birkalla. His brother, Mason, is also a footballer.

== Career statistics ==
=== Club ===
As of match played 11 September 2026

Appearances and goals by club, season and competition
Club	Season	League			National cup (Note: Includes Australia Cup, Cypriot Cup)		Other		Total	
Club	Season	Division	Apps	Goals	Apps	Goals	Apps	Goals	Apps	Goals
Adelaide City	2019	NPL SA	2	0	—		—		2	0
Adelaide City	2020	NPL SA	8	0	—		—		8	0
Adelaide City	Total		10	0	0	0	0	0	10	0
Othellos Athienou	2020–21	Cypriot Second Division	12	2	—		—		12	2
Adelaide City	2021	NPL SA	7	0	—		3 (Note: One appearance in NPL SA Finals; two appearances in Football SA Federation Cup)	0	10	0
West Torrens Birkalla	2022	NPL SA	22	4	—		2 (Note: Appearances in Football SA Federation Cup)	0	24	4
MetroStars	2023	NPL SA	23	4	3	1	5	5	31	10
Adelaide United Youth	2024	NPL SA	7	3	—		—		7	3
Adelaide United	2023–24	A-League	7	0	0	0	—		7	0
Adelaide United	2024–25	A-League	15	2	4	2	—		19	4
Adelaide United	2025–26	A-League	12	1	1	0	—		13	1
Adelaide United	Total		34	3	5	2	0	0	39	5
West Torrens Birkalla	2026	NPL SA	5	0	—		3 (Note: Appearances in NPL SA Finals)	0	8	0
Career total			120	16	8	3	13	5	141	24

=== International ===
As of match played 4 June 2026

Appearances and goals by national team and year
National team	Year	Apps	Goals
Lebanon	2026	1	0
Total		1	0

== Honours ==
Adelaide City

- NPL South Australia Champion: 2021
- Football SA Federation Cup runner-up: 2021

MetroStars

- NPL South Australia Premier: 2023
- Football SA Federation Cup: 2023

Individual

- National Premier Leagues South Australia Team of the Year: 2023

== See also ==
- List of Lebanon international footballers born outside Lebanon
