= Jordan Elsey =

Australian soccer player (born 1994)

Personal information
- Full name: Jordan Elsey
- Date of birth: 2 March 1994 (age 32)
- Place of birth: Adelaide, Australia
- Height: 1.88 m (6 ft 2 in)
- Position: Centre back

Youth career
- 2002–2008: Para Hills Knights
- 2008–2009: FFSA NTC
- 2009–2013: Adelaide United

Senior career*
Years	Team	Apps	(Gls)
2011	→ Para Hills Knights (loan)	16	(0)
2013–2021	Adelaide United	124	(4)
2021–2023	Newcastle Jets	34	(2)
2023	Perth Glory	10	(1)
2023–2024	East Bengal	0	(0)
2024–2025	Adelaide United	4	(1)
2025–	Campbelltown City	2	(1)
- * Club domestic league appearances and goals as of 10:46, April 29, 2025 (UTC)

Jordan Elsey (born 2 March 1994) is an Australian footballer who plays as a centre back for A-League club Adelaide United.

== Playing career ==
In December 2013, Elsey joined Hong Kong First Division club Kitchee on loan, however he was recalled early and subsequently did not make a senior appearance.

In January 2014, Elsey scored his debut goal for Adelaide United in stoppage time of a match against league leaders Brisbane Roar, giving Adelaide United a surprising 2–1 victory.

On 4 November 2014 Adelaide United confirmed that Jordan had ruptured his Anterior Cruciate Ligament. He made his return to action on 7 November 2015 playing for the Adelaide United Youth side and a return to the senior team later in the season.

In July 2021, Elsey departed his hometown club Adelaide United at the end of his contract. He departed with a league title in 2016 with Adelaide United and two Australian Cups in 2018 and 2019, whilst making 124 league appearances and scoring 4 goals.

On 8 July 2021, Jordan Elsey was announced as a signing by the Newcastle Jets for the upcoming 2021/22 season to play under new manager Arthur Papas. He made 34 league appearances.

In January 2023, Elsey departed the Newcastle Jets. Perth Glory confirmed his signing shortly thereafter.

After playing 10 league games and scoring one goal, he departed Perth Glory to explore playing opportunities in India. In August 2023, he signed for East Bengal for two years. He then left after just one year with the club in 2024, with no league appearances due to injury.

In 2024, Elsey returned to his hometown club Adelaide United on a one year deal. He made his first appearance for the club in almost 4 years, coming on as a substitute in a 3-0 loss to Western United on 23 February 2025. A week later, on 1st March 2025, he scored his 5th ever league goal for Adelaide and 1st goal since returning to the club in a 4-4 draw against Auckland FC.

== Honours ==
Adelaide United

- A-League Premiership: 2015/16
- A-League Championship: 2015–16
- Australia Cup: 2018, 2019

Individual

- National Youth League Most Valuable Player: 2012–13
- Rising Star Award: 2013–14
