= Ryan White (soccer) =

Australian soccer player (born 2005)

Personal information
- Full name: Ryan White
- Date of birth: 16 August 2005 (age 21)
- Place of birth: Adelaide, Australia
- Height: 1.88 m (6 ft 2 in)
- Position: Central midfielder

Team information
- Current team: Adelaide United
- Number: 44

Youth career
- Para Hills United
- –2023: Para Hills Knights
- 2023–2024: Adelaide United NPL

Senior career*
Years	Team	Apps	(Gls)
2023–2025	Adelaide United NPL	58	(16)
2024–	Adelaide United	43	(3)

International career^{‡}
2024	Australia U20	1	(0)
- * Club domestic league appearances and goals as of 21 May 2026 ‡ National team caps and goals as of 26 May 2026

Ryan White (born 16 August 2005) is an Australian soccer player who plays as a central midfielder for Adelaide United.

== Career ==
=== Early career ===
White began his football career at Para Hills Knights in the NPL SA before joining Adelaide United's youth squad, who play in the same competition.

=== Adelaide United ===
White made his senior competitive debut for Adelaide United in the 2024 Australia Cup Round of 32 match against Blacktown City FC. In October 2024, he signed a long-term contract with the club.

He enjoyed a breakout campaign in the 2025–26 A-League Men season, making 26 appearance and helping Adelaide to a second place finish, securing qualification for the AFC Champions League Elite. White was named as Adelaide United's Player of the Season, becoming the youngest-ever player to win the award.

== Career statistics ==
=== Club ===
As of match played 15 May 2026

Appearances and goals by club, season and competition
Club	Season	League (Note: Includes A-League finals series)			Cup (Note: Includes Australia Cup)		Continental		Total	
Club	Season	Division	Apps	Goals	Apps	Goals	Apps	Goals	Apps	Goals
Adelaide United	2024–25	A-League Men	17	0	4	0	—		21	0
Adelaide United	2025–26	A-League Men	26	3	1	0	—		27	3
Adelaide United	Total		43	3	5	0	0	0	48	3
