= Max Vartuli =

Australian footballer (born 2005)

Personal information
- Date of birth: 20 January 2005 (age 21)
- Place of birth: Sydney, Australia
- Height: 1.92 m (6 ft 3 1/2 in)
- Position: Goalkeeper

Team information
- Current team: Adelaide United
- Number: 13

Youth career
- 2018–2023: Sydney FC

Senior career*
Years	Team	Apps	(Gls)
2022–2024	Sydney FC NPL	3	(0)
2023–2024	Sydney FC	0	(0)
2023–2024	→ AaB (loan)	0	(0)
2024–	Adelaide United	6	(0)
2025–	Adelaide United NPL	9	(0)

International career^{‡}
2024	Australia U20	1	(0)
- * Club domestic league appearances and goals as of 14 August 2025 ‡ National team caps and goals as of 14 November 2024

Max Vartuli (Italian: [ˈvartuli]; born 20 January 2005) is an Australian professional soccer player who currently plays for A-League Men club Adelaide United.

== Club career ==
=== Sydney FC and AaB Fodbold ===
A young Vartuli's football career began aged 13 in Sydney FC's Academy Schools Program while attending Matraville Sports High School in years 7 and 8 and Endeavour Sports High in year 9. He rose through the ranks into Sydney FC's U20 side before securing a loan move to AaB Fodbold in Denmark aged 18.

=== Adelaide United ===
Vartuli joined Adelaide United on a three-year contract on 15 September 2024.

== International career ==
Vartuli was named on the bench for Australia's U20 friendlies in Marbella, Spain between 12 and 17 October 2023, but he did not make an appearance.
