= Stefan Mauk =

Australian soccer player

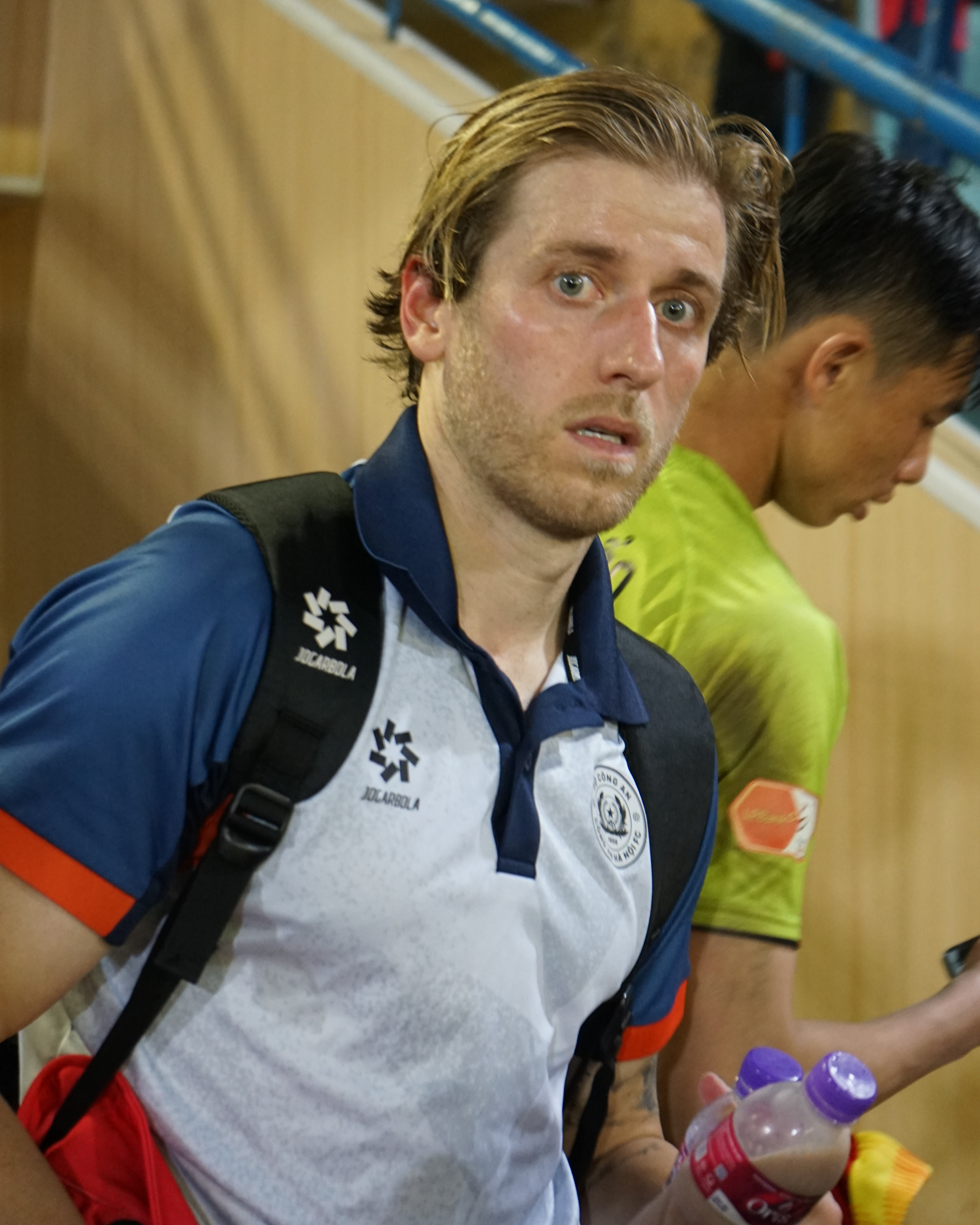
- Mauk in 2026

Personal information
- Full name: Stefan Ingo Mauk
- Date of birth: 12 October 1995 (age 31)
- Place of birth: Adelaide, Australia
- Height: 1.74 m (5 ft 9 in)
- Position: Attacking midfielder

Team information
- Current team: Cong An Hanoi
- Number: 6

Youth career
- Adelaide City
- 2011–2012: AIS
- 2012–2014: Melbourne Heart

Senior career*
Years	Team	Apps	(Gls)
2013–2016	Melbourne City	34	(4)
2015–2016	Melbourne City NPL	1	(0)
2016	Adelaide United	13	(3)
2016–2018	NEC	2	(0)
2017–2018	→ Melbourne City (loan)	23	(5)
2018–2020	Brisbane Roar	14	(1)
2020–2022	Adelaide United	48	(10)
2022–2023	Fagiano Okayama	60	(10)
2024–2026	Adelaide United	39	(11)
2025–2026	→ Cong An Hanoi (loan)	22	(3)
2026–	Cong An Hanoi	2	(1)

International career^{‡}
2011	Australia U17	4	(0)
2013–2015	Australia U20	11	(2)
2014–2018	Australia U23	15	(2)
- * Club domestic league appearances and goals as of 10 September 2026 ‡ National team caps and goals as of 17 January 2018

Stefan Ingo Mauk (born 12 October 1995) is an Australian professional soccer player who plays as an attacking midfielder for V.League 1 club Cong An Hanoi. Mauk is also capable of playing as a box-to-box midfielder and as a right winger.

== Personal life ==
Mauk attended Henley High School. Mauk's father, Georg, died of cancer when Mauk was 15.

== Club career ==
=== Melbourne City ===
Mauk joined Melbourne City as a sixteen-year-old in October 2012, signing a two-year contract after spending time at the Australian Institute of Sport.

=== Adelaide United ===
Mauk returned to Adelaide, his hometown, in January 2016 after signing with Adelaide United in a trade deal for Osama Malik, who moved to Melbourne.

=== N.E.C. ===
On 19 July 2016, Mauk signed a three-year contract at NEC in the Dutch Eredivisie. He made his competitive debut for the side in August 2016 against PEC Zwolle, but was substituted off at halftime in a 1–1 draw. Mauk subsequently fell out of favour at NEC, leading to reports that he would be loaned out in January 2017. No move eventuated, and Mauk remained at the club in May 2017, but still yet to add to his early-season appearance, when manager Peter Hyballa was sacked. Mauk finished the season with three appearances in all competitions as NEC were relegated to the Eerste Divisie, after which Mauk declared his intention to find a new club, citing that he wanted to play more regularly and in a different league.

==== Loan to Melbourne City ====
Mauk returned to Australia on a season-long loan deal, linking with former club Melbourne City for the 2017–18 season.

=== Brisbane Roar ===
On 28 May 2018, Mauk joined Brisbane Roar on a four-year deal from NEC.

=== Adelaide United ===
On 30 January 2020, Mauk left Brisbane Roar to rejoin Adelaide United. He was announced as the club's new captain on 1 December 2020, becoming the fifth South Australian player in the club's history to take on this role.

=== Fagiano Okayama ===
On 22 February 2022, following a long and impressive spell in A-League, he was announced officially by J2 League club Fagiano Okayama, joining in a complete transfer from Adelaide United.

=== Adelaide United ===
On 2 February 2024, Stefan returned to Adelaide United on a free transfer until the 26/27 season. On 31 February 2025, Stefan departed the club on a one-year loan deal to Vietnamese club Cong An Hanoi.

=== Cong An Hanoi ===
On 22 May 2026, it was announced that Cong An Hanoi had taken the option to buy Mauk, which was included during his initial loan spell.

== International career ==
Mauk was first called up to the Australian squad for a friendly against England played on 27 May 2016.

== Honours ==
Adelaide United

- A-League Premiers: 2015–16
- A-League Championship: 2015–16

Cong An Hanoi

- V.League 1: 2025–26
- Vietnamese Super Cup: 2026

Individual

- Rising Star Award: 2015–16
