= Panagiotis Kikianis =

Australian soccer player

Personal information
- Full name: Panagiotis Argyrios Kikianis
- Date of birth: 8 March 2005 (age 21)
- Place of birth: Adelaide, South Australia, Australia
- Height: 1.85 m (6 ft 1 in)
- Position: Central defender

Team information
- Current team: Adelaide United
- Number: 4

Youth career
- 2011–2013: Fulham United
- 2014–2017: West Adelaide
- 2018–2020: Football SA NTC
- 2021–2024: Adelaide United

Senior career*
| Years | Team | Apps | (Gls) |
| 2021–2024 | Adelaide United NPL | 35 | (0) |
| 2022– | Adelaide United | 51 | (5) |

International career^{‡}
| 2023–2025 | Australia U20 | 12 | (3) |
| 2026– | Australia U23 | 1 | (0) |
Medal record
Men's football
Representing Australia
AFC U-20 Asian Cup
| Winner | 2025 China | Team |
- * Club domestic league appearances and goals as of 9 May 2025 ‡ National team caps and goals as of 5 October 2025

Panagiotis "Pana" Kikianis (Greek: Παναγιώτης Κικιανής, Greek: [panaʝˈotis ciciˈanis]; born 8 March 2005) is an Australian professional soccer player who plays as a central defender for A-League Men club Adelaide United.

== Club career ==
Born in Adelaide, South Australia, Kikianis played in the youth leagues of the National Premier Leagues with West Adelaide and the National Training Centre program before playing for Adelaide United in 2021. He signed his first professional contract on 6 September 2023 as a scholarship player.

During the 2023–24 season, Kikianis made his senior debut on 3 March 2024 in a 4–0 defeat to Central Coast Mariners and scored his first goal, a late-equaliser, in a 3–3 draw to Perth Glory. After making five appearances and one goal that season, Kikianis extended on a five-year contract for Adelaide United on 4 July, being the first recipient tied to a five-year contract in A-League history.

The 2024–25 season was a breakout season for Kikianis, where he became a regular starter and formed a centre-back partnership with Bart Vriends who "massively" impacted the growth of Kikianis according to Adelaide United assistant coach Mark Milligan.

== International career ==
Born in Australia, Kikianis is of Greek descent. received his first international callup when he was selected as part of the Australian under 18 team which participated in the FPF Portugal Sub-18 tournament in June 2023. He then was called up for the Australia U20 side which competed in 2025 AFC U-20 Asian Cup qualification., In his first appearance of the tournament, he scored both goals in a 2-0 win over Macau.

== Honours ==
Australia U-20

- AFC U-20 Asian Cup Champions: 2025
