= Ethan Alagich =

Australian soccer player (born 2003)

Personal information
- Full name: Ethan Alagich
- Date of birth: 18 December 2003 (age 22)
- Place of birth: Adelaide, South Australia, Australia
- Position: Defensive midfielder

Team information
- Current team: Adelaide United
- Number: 55

Youth career
- 2009: Valley View SC
- 2010–2015: Adelaide Croatia Raiders
- 2016–2019: FFSA NTC
- 2019–2021: Adelaide United

Senior career*
Years	Team	Apps	(Gls)
2020–2023	Adelaide United NPL	56	(5)
2021–	Adelaide United	90	(6)

International career^{‡}
2025–2026	Australia U23	6	(3)
- * Club domestic league appearances and goals as of 15 May 2026 ‡ National team caps and goals as of 10 September 2025

Ethan Alagić (Croatian: [aˈlaɡitʃ]; born 18 December 2003) is an Australian professional soccer player who plays as a defensive midfielder for A-League Men club Adelaide United. He is the son of former Australian professional footballer Richie Alagich.

== Club career ==
=== Adelaide United ===
Raised in a football-loving family, Alagich began playing football in Valley View, South Australia, with Valley View SC and Port Adelaide Pirates in their under-6. He also spent time at Adelaide Croatia Raiders, where he played for nearly six years, before being signed by Adelaide United in 2019.

For Adelaide United Youth, Alagich would make 22 league appearances, including one goal in the National Premier Leagues South Australia. He made his first-team debut as a substitute on 26 September 2021 in a 3–1 extra-time cup victory over Floreat Athena. Alagich was later added to the first-team squad after signing a scholarship deal with the club in January 2022.

Alagich made his starting debut on 11 November 2022 in a 3–0 victory over rivals Melbourne Victory at Coopers Stadium. He and Richie became the third father-son duo to playe for the club in a competitive match. Alagich was named Adelaide United's A-League Men Rising Star, jointly with Nestor Irankunda, and extended on a two-year deal with the club in July 2023.

== Personal life ==
Raised in South Australia, Alagich is the son of former Australian professional footballer Richie Alagich, who played over 400 competitive matches, including 92 for Adelaide United. His grandfather, Colin Alagich Snr, was a footballer and referee whilst his aunty, Dianne Alagich, was also a professional footballer. Alagich is of distant Croatian descent - As his great, great-uncle migrated to Australia from Yugoslavia in 1932.
