= Luka Jovanović =

Australian soccer player (born 2005)

Personal information
- Full name: Luka Jovanović
- Date of birth: 20 May 2005 (age 21)
- Place of birth: Adelaide, Australia
- Height: 1.80 m (5 ft 11 in)
- Position: Striker

Team information
- Current team: San Jose Earthquakes
- Number: 9

Youth career
- 2010: FK Beograd
- 2011–2015: Croydon
- 2016: MetroStars
- 2017–2018: Football SA NTC
- 2019–2022: Adelaide United

Senior career*
Years	Team	Apps	(Gls)
2019–2024	Adelaide United NPL	39	(33)
2022–2026	Adelaide United	78	(23)
2026–	San Jose Earthquakes	5	(0)
2026–	San Jose Earthquakes II	1	(0)

International career^{‡}
2023–2025	Australia U20	16	(8)
2026–	Australia U23	4	(1)
Medal record
Men's football
Representing Australia
AFC U-20 Asian Cup
Winner	2025 China	Team
- * Club domestic league appearances and goals as of 2 October 2026 ‡ National team caps and goals as of 17 January 2026

Luka Jovanović (Serbian Cyrillic: Лука Јовановић, pronounced [ˈluka joʋaˈnoʋitɕ]; born 20 May 2005) is an Australian professional footballer who plays as a striker for Major League Soccer club San Jose Earthquakes.

== Club career ==
=== Adelaide United ===
He made his professional debut in an A-League Men's match for Adelaide United against Western United on 6 November 2022, as a substitute in a 4–2 win. Jovanovic was awarded the John Aloisi Rising Star award for his performances for Adelaide United NPL in the National Premier Leagues SA over the 2022 season. On 11 March 2023, Jovanovic scored his first goal in senior football for Adelaide United in their 4–2 win over the Newcastle Jets.

After a strong 2024 Australia Cup campaign, Jovanovic opened his account early into the 2024-25 A-League season, scoring against the reigning premiers Central Coast only ten minutes into Adelaide's first match.

On 9 May 2025, Jovanovic scored the first ever A-League Men finals goal at Ironbark Fields, scoring in the 3rd minute of an eventual 3–2 loss to Western United in a 2025 A-League Men finals series elimination final match.

On 1 November 2025, Jovanović scored his first goal of the 2025–26 season in a 2–1 defeat to Auckland FC at Mount Smart Stadium. He followed that by recording a goal and an assist in each of his next two appearances, helping Adelaide United to a 2–0 victory over Western Sydney Wanderers and a 4–1 win over Melbourne City.

On the final day of the regular season, Jovanović scored a brace, including a 98th-minute winner, in a 2–1 victory over Melbourne City at AAMI Park. He was subsequently sent off after receiving a second yellow card for removing his shirt during the celebrations. The victory secured second place for Adelaide in the A-League, while his brace drew him level with Sam Cosgrove on 11 goals in the golden boot race.

As a result of his suspension, Jovanović missed the first leg of Adelaide United's A-League Men semi-final against Auckland FC. He returned for the second leg as an early substitute following an injury to Anselmo, but Adelaide were eliminated after a 4–1 aggregate defeat. This would be Jovanovic's last appearance for Adelaide.

=== San Jose Earthquakes ===
On 16 July 2026, Jovanović joined Major League Soccer club San Jose Earthquakes for an undisclosed seven-figure transfer fee, signing a contract through the end of the 2027–28 Major League Soccer season, with a club option for 2028–29.

== International career ==
Jovanovic is eligible to represent Australia through birth or Serbia through his parents at international level.

== Career statistics ==
As of match played 15 August 2026

Appearances and goals by club, season and competition
Club	Season	League			Cup (Note: Appearances in Australia Cup)		Other		Total	
Club	Season	Division	Apps	Goals	Apps	Goals	Apps	Goals	Apps	Goals
Adelaide United	2022–23	A-League Men	9	3	0	0	0	0	9	3
Adelaide United	2023–24	A-League Men	24	4	2	0	0	0	26	4
Adelaide United	2024–25	A-League Men	20	4	3	2	1 (Note: Appearances in A-League Finals)	1	24	7
Adelaide United	2025–26	A-League Men	23	11	1	0	1	0	25	11
Adelaide United	Total		76	22	6	2	0	0	84	25
San Jose Earthquakes	2026	Major League Soccer	1	0	0	0	0	0	1	0
Career total			78	23	6	2	0	0	84	25

== Honours ==
Australia U-20

- AFC U-20 Asian Cup Champions: 2025

Individual

- A-League Men Golden Boot: 2025-26
