= Ben Warland =

Australian soccer player (born 1996)

Personal information
- Full name: Benjamin Andrew Warland
- Date of birth: 4 September 1996 (age 30)
- Place of birth: Gawler, South Australia, Australia
- Height: 1.85 m (6 ft 1 in)
- Position: Central defender

Youth career
- Gawler Eagles
- Campbelltown City
- 2011–2012: AIS
- 2014–2017: Adelaide United

Senior career*
Years	Team	Apps	(Gls)
2013	AIS	13	(0)
2014–2018	Adelaide United	9	(0)
2015–2017	Adelaide United NPL	37	(3)
2018–2022	Sydney FC	42	(0)
2022–2024	Adelaide United	33	(3)
2024–2026	Brisbane Roar	9	(0)

International career^{‡}
2014	Australia U-20	4	(0)
- * Club domestic league appearances and goals as of 28 April 2026 ‡ National team caps and goals as of 11 May 2015

Benjamin Andrew Warland (/ˈwɔːrlənd/; born 4 September 1996) is an Australian professional soccer player who last played as a central defender for Brisbane Roar.

== Early and personal life ==
Warland was born in Gawler, South Australia. His father was an Australian rules football player with Gawler Central Football Club. Warland was encouraged by his father to play Aussie rules, but since he was too young at the time, he was instead enrolled in soccer with Gawler Eagles in the under-6. He then joined Adelaide City and Campbelltown City in their junior age groups before moving to the AIS at the age of 14. Warland is married to Olivia Warland (née Alarcón) and has two children, a daughter (born December 2021) and a son (born November 2023).

After being released by Brisbane Roar in 2026, Warland began working as a Credit Analyst for Vision Finance Collective in Brisbane.

== Club career ==
=== Adelaide United ===
In August 2013, Warland was invited by Adelaide United to train with their first-team until the end of the month. Picked up by Josep Gombau, Warland signed on a two-year contract with Adelaide in September 2013 and was set to join in the following season. He began playing for Adelaide United Youth in their A-League Youth and National Premier Leagues campaign in 2015.

Warland made his first-team debut on 25 April 2015 in a 4–1 league victory over Melbourne City at Coopers Stadium. He remained with the Youths after the conclusion of the 2014–15 A-League season, and extended on a two-year deal with the club in November 2015. Warland made his starting debut on 25 February 2017 in a 2–1 loss against rivals Melbourne Victory.

Warland was ruled out in pre-season during Adelaide United's 2017–18 season with a thigh injury from international duty. He featured as a substitute on 24 October 2017 in a 2–1 semi-final cup victory against Western Sydney Wanderers at Campbelltown Stadium. Warland started in the 2017 FFA Cup final as a result of Ersan Gülüm becoming injured. Adelaide United finished runners-up after losing 2–1 to Sydney FC. Warland was released in January 2018, having asked the club to leave due to playing time.

=== Sydney FC ===
Following his release, Warland signed on a one-and-a-half-year deal with Sydney FC. He made his debut as a substitute for the club on 13 March 2018 in a goalless draw against Kashima Antlers in the AFC Champions League. Four days later, Warland made his A-League debut in a 2–1 defeat to Brisbane Roar, and featured as a substitute on 29 March 2018 in a 3–2 victory over Perth Glory, in which Sydney FC claimed their second consecutive Premiership.

Warland scored his first goal for the club, and first in his professional career, on 1 August 2018 in a 4–2 cup win against Rockdale City Suns. He suffered from a foot injury a month later after colliding with a teammate in training and was ruled out for three months, missing the remainder of the 2018 FFA Cup campaign. Sydney FC lost the final to his former side Adelaide United. Warland extended with Sydney FC on a two-year contract in October 2018, shortly after his injury. He was replaced by Jacob Tratt, who signed on a short-term injury replacement contract, in November 2019. Warland made his return from injury on 19 January 2019 against Newcastle Jets, however, after a match against Melbourne City, returned to the sidelines with an anterior cruciate ligament injury on 17 March 2019. He was out for a further 12 months after receiving surgery.

During his rehab, Sydney FC won the 2019 A-League Grand Final on penalties against Perth Glory at Perth Stadium. In February 2020, Warland was named on the bench against Central Coast Mariners, but did not feature in the match. He missed the entirety of the 2019–20 A-League season and eventually started his return to training full-time in June 2020. Warland made his return on 19 November 2020 in an AFC Champions League match against Shanghai Port. On 22 January 2021, Warland scored an own goal, extended by Alou Kuol in a 2–0 defeat to Central Coast Mariners, making it the first defeat for Sydney FC of the season and in seven years against the Mariners. Warland renewed on a two-year contract with the Sky Blues in February 2021, and played in the 2021 A-League Grand Final against Melbourne City. He was released by the club in June 2022.

=== Return to Adelaide United ===
In June 2022, Warland returned to Adelaide United from Sydney FC. He signed a two-year deal.

In May 2023, he was released from Adelaide United after his contract expired. He played 33 league games and scored 3 goals with his second stint with Adelaide United.

== Honours ==
Sydney FC

- A-League Premiership: 2017–18, 2019–20
- A-League Championship: 2019, 2020
