= Adelaide United FC Youth =

Australian football youth system

Adelaide United Youth
- Full name: Adelaide United Football Club Youth
- Nickname: Young Reds
- Founded: 2008; 18 years ago
- Ground: ServiceFM Stadium
- Capacity: 8,000 (1,000 seated)
- Coordinator: Eleni Vosnakis
- Youth coach: Airton Andrioli
- League: NPL South Australia
- 2026: 7th of 12
- Website: adelaideunited.com.au
Home colours	Away colours

Adelaide United Football Club Youth is the youth system of Adelaide United Football Club based in Adelaide, South Australia. The team plays in the National Premier Leagues, the second level of Australia's soccer pyramid in Australia.

== History ==
=== Early Years (2009–2014) ===
The team was founded in 2008, as an Adelaide United representative team for the inaugural season of the National Youth League competition. Former Adelaide City player, Joe Mullen was appointed as head coach for Adelaide's inaugural youth squad. They finished 2nd to the qualification of the 2009 Grand Final against Sydney FC. The final result was a 2–0 loss at Hindmarsh Stadium with Adelaide finishing runners-up into both the premiership and championship.

Adelaide's top-scorer for their first two seasons was Francesco Monterosso with the first season scoring 13 goals and with the second season scoring 17 goals. This was the only back-to-back Golden Boot winner in the National Youth League.

Within the change of the NYL table format in the second National Youth League season, Adelaide United were still able to qualify for the NYL finals finishing 3rd. Adelaide United lost 1–0 to Perth Glory in the semi-final.

In the 2010–11 season, in the race for the premiership, they finished 3rd again, followed by Central Coast Mariners Youth in 2nd with Gold Coast United Youth being the premiers for the season.

=== National Premier Leagues entry (2014–present) ===
In October 2014, it was confirmed that the team would compete in the National Premier Leagues South Australia and National Premier Leagues South Australia Reserves (U20) competitions for the PS4 2015 FFSA season entering in the State League 1, the second division of South Australian football.

They gained automatic promotion in their first season to the National Premier Leagues after finishing top of the table as well as the Reserves (U20s).

In October 2015, it was announced that AUFC Youth team were to compete in the 2015 Mediterranean International Cup in Barcelona, Spain. Their first match in Group A was against Los Angeles with the result as a 4–0 victory. Then they lost 1–0 against Barcelona. This was the first game for an Adelaide United side to face Barcelona. The final game was against Palamos CF in a 3–0 victory for Adelaide.

With the final game victory, Adelaide moved on to the Round of 16 against CF Lloret. Both teams could not be split, as the full-time score was 0–0. The game was decided in a penalty shoot-out, which Adelaide United won 5–4. The Reds ended their 2015 Mediterranean International Cup, with a 4–0 loss against Malaga CF.

On 11 January 2016, Adelaide United claimed their premiership in Conference A, with Sydney FC Youth crowned Premiers for Conference B. The Grand Final was played at Central Coast Stadium with Sydney winning the grand final against Adelaide for the second season in a row between these two sides. The final result was 5–2 to Sydney FC Youth with them being 2016 National Youth League Champions.

After their successful premiership in the State League 1, they moved on to the National Premier Leagues South Australia and finished 10th which was one spot away from relegating back to the State League. In 2017, they finished the same position as 2016, finishing 10th, and still avoiding relegation. As the two unsuccessful seasons were finished, Adelaide United Youth qualified for the NPL SA Finals Series for the first time and was defeated by North Eastern MetroStars by a 1–0 scoreline in the qualifying-finals.

== Players ==
As of 24 February 2026

Note: Flags indicate national team as defined under FIFA eligibility rules; some limited exceptions apply. Players may hold more than one non-FIFA nationality.

No.	Pos.	Nation	Player
13	GK	AUS	Max Vartuli
15	DF	AUS	Israel Monga
18	FW	AUS	Jake Najdovski
35	FW	AUS	Brody Burkitt
36	DF	AUS	Panashe Madanha
40	GK	AUS	Ethan Cox
45	FW	AUS	Alex Battistella
46	FW	AUS	Ali Mohtashami
47	FW	AUS	Mutsa Mupandawana
48	MF	AUS	Bae Versace
52	DF	AUS	Sotiri Phillis
53	DF	AUS	Emerson Koenig
52	DF	AUS	Bailey O'Neil
56	DF	AUS	Jerome Scarfo
57	MF	AUS	Liam Stam
58	DF	AUS	Harry Crawford
60	GK	AUS	Hugo Ng
61	FW	AUS	Iluka Wootton
62	MF	AUS	Fabian Talladira
63	MF	AUS	Daniel Wojcik
65	FW	AUS	Joey Garuccio

No.	Pos.	Nation	Player
67	MF	AUS	Luka Blazevic
70	GK	AUS	Laris Cesko
71	DF	AUS	Vinko Stanisic
73	MF	AUS	David Kabazo
74	FW	AUS	Amlani Tatu
75	MF	AUS	Fabian Grelli
77	MF	AUS	Sajjad Ali Nasiri
78	DF	AUS	Malual Nichola
79	DF	AUS	Feyzo Kasumović
82	FW	AUS	Chris Irakoze
83	DF	AUS	Mitchell Knight
84	MF	AUS	Kaspar Kuzman
85	DF	AUS	Deklan Cooper-Ndambuki
86	DF	AUS	Luke Hurst
88	MF	AUS	Kalan Alagich
89	FW	AUS	Amara Toure
91	FW	AUS	Riad Rarhidi
92	DF	AUS	Joel Ochieng
93	DF	AUS	Keron Longhe
99	DF	AUS	Henry Lynch

== Current staff ==
As of 22 February 2026

(Australia) Paul Vanis	Head coach
(Spain) Javi López	Assistant coach
(Australia) Deng Akoy	Assistant coach
(Australia) William Plush	Assistant coach
(Australia) Rian del Nido	Goalkeeper coach

== Honours ==
=== National ===
- A-League Youth Champions
  - Runners-up (2): 2009, 2016
- A-League Youth Premiers
  - Runners-up (1): 2008–09

=== State ===
- National Premier Leagues South Australia Champions
  - Winners (1): 2023
- State League 1 South Australia Champions
  - Winners (1): 2015

== Former youth team players to receive international recognition ==
The following list of youth team have been capped in a full international. Players still currently playing for the club are in bold. Other still active players are in italics.

- (Australia) Mark Birighitti
- (Vanuatu) Jared Clark
- (Australia) Nestory Irankunda
- (Australia) Paul Izzo
- (Australia) Awer Mabil
- (Australia) Michael Marrone
- (Australia) Riley McGree
- (Burundi) Pacifique Niyongabire
- (Australia) Ruon Tongyik
- (Australia) Al Hassan Toure
- (Australia) Mohamed Toure
- (Australia) Apostolos Stamatelopoulos
- (Australia) Ryan Strain
- (Australia) Kusini Yengi

== Former players ==
This is a list of former Adelaide United Youth players, who have played at least 20 competitive matches for the first team.

As of 24 July 2025

Name	Nationality	Position	Adelaide United career	Appearances	Goals
**Ethan Alagich**	Australia	Midfielder	2021–	75	2
Lachlan Barr	Australia	Defender	2022–24	39	3
Bernardo	Australia	Midfielder	2021–2024	39	5
Giuseppe Bovalina	Australia	Defender	2023–24	23	1
Lachlan Brook	Australia	Forward	2017–20, 2022	29	1
Louis D'Arrigo	Australia	Midfielder	2018–23	106	5
Jordan Elsey	Australia	Defender	2013–21	145	7
Ben Garuccio	Australia	Defender	2016–18	60	1
Nestor Irankunda	Australia	Forward	2022–24	61	16
Paul Izzo	Australia	Goalkeeper	2011–15, 2017–20	99	0
**Luka Jovanovic**	Australia	Forward	2022–	59	14
Bruce Kamau	Australia	Forward	2014–16	32	3
**Panagiotis Kikianis**	Australia	Defender	2023–	31	3
**Ryan Kitto**	Australia	Defender	2013–15, 2016–	231	19
Nathan Konstandopoulos	Australia	Midfielder	2014–16, 2017–21, 2022	77	7
Awer Mabil	Australia	Forward	2012–15	52	9
**Panashe Madanha**	Australia	Defender	2022–	24	0
Osama Malik	Australia	Midfielder	2008–09, 2011–16	111	2
Michael Marrone	Australia	Defender	2008–10, 2014–21	193	4
Riley McGree	Australia	Midfielder	2016–17, 2019–20	51	15
Nikola Mileusnic	Australia	Forward	2016–20	103	19
Pacifique Niyongabire	Burundi	Forward	2018–21	24	1
Mark Ochieng	Australia	Forward	2014–18	35	2
Jordan O'Doherty	Australia	Midfielder	2016–18	36	2
Alexandar Popovic	Australia	Defender	2022–24	45	2
Ryan Strain	Australia	Defender	2017–21	90	0
Al Hassan Toure	Australia	Forward	2019–21	36	7
Mohamed Touré	Australia	Forward	2020–22	42	7
Ben Warland	Australia	Defender	2014–17, 2022–24	50	3
**Ryan White**	Australia	Midfielder	2024–	21	0
Kusini Yengi	Australia	Forward	2020–22	28	6
**Jonny Yull**	Australia	Midfielder	2021–	53	1

- **Bold** denotes players still playing in Adelaide United

== See also ==
- Adelaide United FC
- Adelaide United FC (A-League Women)
