= Archie Goodwin (soccer) =

Australian soccer player (born 2004)

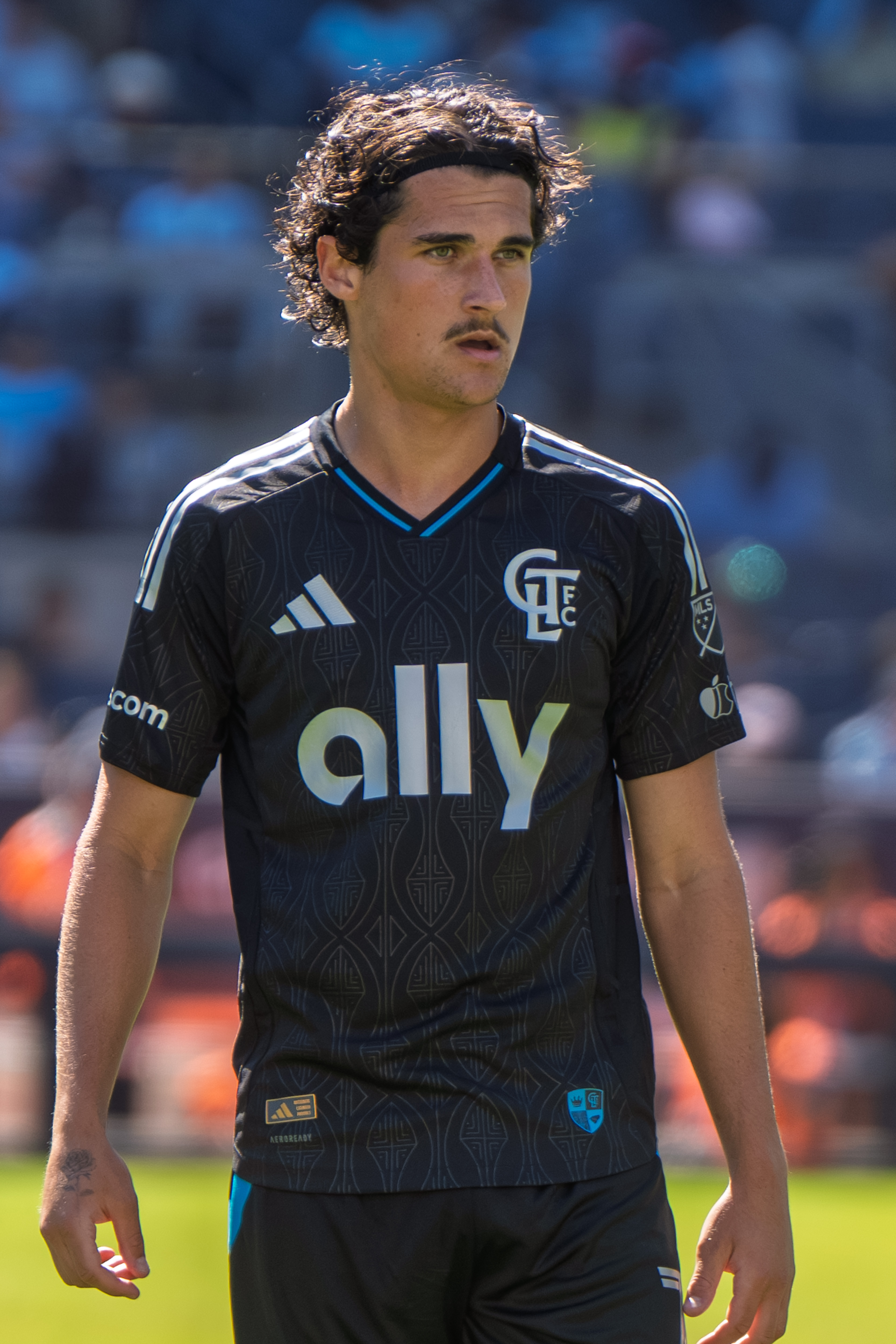

Personal information
- Full name: Archie Stuart Wayne Goodwin
- Date of birth: 7 November 2004 (age 22)
- Place of birth: Newcastle, Australia
- Height: 1.83 m (6 ft 0 in)
- Position: Striker

Team information
- Current team: Charlotte FC
- Number: 7

Youth career
- 2010–2013: Cooks Hill United
- 2014–2019: Newcastle Jets

Senior career*
Years	Team	Apps	(Gls)
2020–2022	Newcastle Jets NPL	21	(15)
2021–2024	Newcastle Jets	44	(7)
2024–2025	Adelaide United	26	(13)
2025	Crown Legacy FC	1	(0)
2025–	Charlotte FC	30	(3)

International career^{‡}
2022–2023	Australia U20	6	(1)
- * Club domestic league appearances and goals as of 4 August 2026 ‡ National team caps and goals as of 11 March 2023

Archie Stuart Wayne Goodwin (born 7 November 2004) is an Australian professional soccer player who plays as a striker for Major League Soccer club Charlotte FC.

Raised in Cooks Hill, New South Wales, Goodwin started his career with Newcastle Jets, making his professional debut, aged 16, in February 2021, becoming the club's youngest player. He also became their youngest goalscorer when he scored his first goal in June 2021, helping them avoid the wooden spoon. For the forthcoming seasons, Goodwin would be plagued by injuries, missing the majority of matches in the 2021–22, 2022–23 and 2023–24 season for Jets. He signed for Adelaide United in June 2024, winning the Golden Boot in his first season with 13 goals, the youngest player to ever win the award.

An Australian international, Goodwin has played for the Australia national team at youth level.

== Early life ==
Goodwin was born on 7 November 2004 in Newcastle, New South Wales. Raised in Cooks Hill, Goodwin began playing football with Cooks Hill United at the age of five, spending three years with the club, before being signed by Newcastle Jets in their under 9s. He later resided in Hamilton East and attended Newcastle High School. However, in the year of his Higher School Certificate exam, Goodwin began focussing full-time on football. Goodwin supported Newcastle Jets and Premier League club Liverpool while growing up. He takes inspiration from Craig Johnston for his resolute personality.

== Club career ==
=== Newcastle Jets ===
Since joining the under-9s, Goodwin has experienced numerous injuries during his time in the youth age groups of Newcastle Jets. He played only eight months of football in three years after breaking each of his feet three times. Doctors conclude it to be the result of growth spurts. However, by the end of the under-15s season in 2019, Goodwin scored 29 goals in 12 matches despite the injuries he faced during the season. He was called up to the National Premier Leagues squad the following year, making one goal in eight appearances in his first season. Goodwin eventually began training with the first-team in May 2020, after their return to football from the COVID-19 pandemic. (Note: Clubs were permitted to commence training effective immediately at 12:00 a.m. on 22 May 2020, as communicated in a letter from a Football NSW spokesperson after temporary restrictions were lifted during the COVID-19 pandemic.) Goodwin made his professional debut as a substitute on 21 February 2021 in a 1–0 league win over Melbourne Victory, becoming the youngest debutant for Newcastle Jets at the age of 16 years and 106 days. He scored his first goal for the club on 10 June 2021, netting the second goal from 25-yards in a 2–1 victory against Melbourne City at the Netstrata Jubilee Stadium. Aged 16 years and 151 days, he became the club's youngest goalscorer, helping them finish above last place in the 2020–21 A-League season. Goodwin was awarded the club's A-League Rising Star following the match.

During pre-season ahead of the 2021–22 A-League season, Goodwin was ruled out due to continuous joint pains in his knees resulted from intensive training and growing pains. He missed the first 16 matches of the campaign during which he underwent rehabilitation until he was able to cope in training. On his return to training, Goodwin played in the National Premier Leagues NSW 4 for the youth team. He scored four goals on 21 March 2022 in an 8–0 win against Fraser Park, taking his tally to a total of five goals in the opening two league games for the youth side. Goodwin made his return to the first-team four days later, scoring two goals in a 2–0 victory over Sydney FC, and in doing so, became the youngest player to score a brace in the league. He made a further seven appearances under head coach Arthur Papas. Goodwin scored his third goal of the season in a 3–1 playoff victory over Perth Glory on 12 May 2022, helping Newcastle progress through to the Round of 32 in the 2022 Australia Cup. He extended on a three-year contract with Newcastle Jets on 25 May 2022. Amid Newcastle Jets' 2022–23 pre-season, Goodwin went through pre-season injury-free for the first time since joining the senior team. He scored his first goal of the league season on 27 January 2023 in a 4–0 win against Brisbane Roar. He scored his second in consecutive games a week later in a 2–2 draw with Perth Glory.

Within weeks after the match, Goodwin was ruled out with a back injury and a torn groin sustained after the international break. He eventually received surgery in May and returned to training full-time in early-June prior to the 2023 Australia Cup. Under new coach Robert Stanton, Goodwin scored in his return on 17 July 2023 in a cup win against Melbourne Victory. The Jets secured a 4–2 victory in the penalty shootout after a 2–2 draw in regular time. Goodwin was subsequently ruled out for the remainder of the Australia Cup and the early 2023–24 A-League season after sustaining continuous spasms in his lower back. Goodwin received two surgeries on his back and was absent for 14 weeks on the sideline. Goodwin made his return to the first-team on 25 November 2023, scoring his first F3 Derby goal in a 3–1 league defeat to Central Coast Mariners in Gosford. After two goals in 20 league appearances, Goodwin was announced by Newcastle Jets as one of nine players to depart in May 2024. The chief executive officer of Newcastle Jets stated that Goodwin rejected the final offer from the club to pursue new challenge in a different environment.

=== Adelaide United ===
On 6 June 2024, Goodwin signed for Adelaide United on a four-year deal. Goodwin played his first game and scored his first goal for the club in a pre-season friendly against local side The Cove FC in a 9–0 win for United. On 7 February 2025, Goodwin scored his eighth goal of the season for Adelaide against Melbourne City in a 1–0 win, outscoring his total league goals for Newcastle in just one season. On the last game of the season, Goodwin suffered a Hamstring Tear in a 0–0 draw against Melbourne City, causing him to miss out on the 2024/25 A-League Final Series. Commentator's Simon Hill and Andy Harper met the injury with great concern due to his injury problems whilst at Newcastle. However, in Goodwin's first season with Adelaide, he scored 13 goals in 26 games, earning the 2024–25 A-League Golden Boot, joint with Adrian Segecic, the youngest player to win the award.

=== Charlotte FC ===
On 13 August 2025, Goodwin signed for Major League Soccer side Charlotte FC on a three and a half year deal. Goodwin made his debut for Charlotte on 31 August 2025, coming on as a 90th-minute substitute for Idan Toklomati in a 1–0 win over the New York Red Bulls at Bank of America Stadium.

He scored his first goals for the club on 21 March 2026, a brace in a 6–1 victory over the New York Red Bulls. He then scored in consecutive matches, converting a 90th-minute penalty in a 2–1 defeat to Nashville SC, before scoring in a 6–1 win over Charlotte Independence in the U.S. Open Cup. On 4 August 2026, Goodwin scored his first Leagues Cup goal in a 3–0 victory over Pumas UNAM.

== Career statistics ==
As of match played 4 August 2026

Appearances and goals by club, season and competition
Club	Season	League			National cup (Note: Includes Australia Cup, U.S. Open Cup)		League cup (Note: Appearances in Leagues Cup)		Other		Total	
Club	Season	Division	Apps	Goals	Apps	Goals	Apps	Goals	Apps	Goals	Apps	Goals
Newcastle Jets FC Youth	2020	NPL 2 NSW	8	1	–		–		–		8	1
Newcastle Jets FC Youth	2021	NPL 4 NSW	9	5	–		–		–		9	5
Newcastle Jets FC Youth	2022	NSW League Three	4	9	–		–		–		4	9
Newcastle Jets FC Youth	Club total		21	15	–		–		–		21	15
Newcastle Jets FC	2020–21	A-League	8	1	0	0	–		–		8	1
Newcastle Jets FC	2021–22	A-League	8	2	1	1	–		–		9	3
Newcastle Jets FC	2022–23	A-League	8	2	1	0	–		–		9	2
Newcastle Jets FC	2023–24	A-League	20	2	1	1	–		–		21	3
Newcastle Jets FC	Club total		44	7	3	2	–		–		47	9
Adelaide United	2024–25	A-League	26	13	0	0	–		0 (Note: Appearances in A-League Finals)	0	26	13
Charlotte FC	2025	Major League Soccer	9	0	0	0	0	0	–		9	0
Charlotte FC	2026	Major League Soccer	16	2	2	1	1	1	–		19	4
Crown Legacy FC	2025	MLS Next Pro	1	0	–		–		–		1	0
Career total			117	37	5	3	1	1	0	0	123	41

== Honours ==
Individual

- A-League Golden Boot: 2024–25
