= Jonny Yull =

Australian soccer player

Personal information
- Full name: Jonny Mark Yull
- Date of birth: 5 March 2005 (age 21)
- Place of birth: Amersham, England
- Height: 1.74 m (5 ft 9 in)
- Position: Central midfielder

Team information
- Current team: Adelaide United
- Number: 12

Youth career
- West Torrens Birkalla
- FFSA NTC

Senior career*
Years	Team	Apps	(Gls)
2020–2024	Adelaide United NPL	78	(20)
2021–	Adelaide United	75	(5)

International career^{‡}
2023–2025	Australia U20	16	(2)
2026–	Australia U23	1	(0)
Medal record
Men's football
Representing Australia
AFC U-20 Asian Cup
Winner	2025 China	Team
- * Club domestic league appearances and goals as of 8 March 2026 ‡ National team caps and goals as of 29 September 2025

Jonny Mark Yull (/jʌl/, YUL; born 5 March 2005) is a professional soccer player who plays as a central midfielder for Adelaide United. Born in England, he represents Australia at youth level.

== Club career ==
=== Adelaide United ===
In December 2020, Yull was named to Adelaide United's senior squad against Western United. In June 2021, he signed a senior scholarship contract. Yull made two appearances in the 2020–21 A-League season becoming the third youngest player to feature for Adelaide United at 15 years 321 days old but did not feature for the club in the 2021–22 A-League Men Season.

In July 2022, Yull went on trial at English Premier League club Chelsea in the hope of signing with their academy.

== Honours ==
Australia U-20

- AFC U-20 Asian Cup Champions: 2025
