= Australia Cup appearances =

The following table details the appearances by clubs in the regular rounds (round of 32 onwards) of the Australia Cup association football competition. The competition was known as the FFA Cup until the name was changed in February 2022.

The 32 teams that make up the Australia Cup competition proper are 10 A-League Men teams with the remaining 22 teams composed of various semi-professional and amateur qualifiers, referred to as "Member Federation Clubs", from each of the state federations. Up to and including the 2019 edition, the top level A-League Men clubs automatically qualified for the round of 32, while the "Member Federation Clubs" from lower levels have to qualify through preliminary rounds, or (since 2015) via winning the National Premier Leagues final.

For the 2020 FFA Cup the preliminary competition was suspended in mid-March due to the COVID-19 pandemic in Australia, and subsequently cancelled in July.

Following expansion of the A-League Men, from the 2021 edition, the bottom four teams of the A-League Men season played-off for two spots to maintain the total number of A-League Men teams at 10 for the Round of 32.

From 2026, with New Zealand-based A-League clubs Wellington Phoenix and Auckland FC are omitted.

== Appearances ==
As of 10 October 2026.

Final position count of clubs are updated only for clubs eliminated from the competition (so does not include clubs still active in the current competition).

Team	Federation	Appearances	Debut	Latest	Best Result	Champions	Runners-up	Semi-finals	Quarter-finals	Round of 16	Round of 32
Adelaide United	Football Australia	12	2014	2026	Champions (2014, 2018, 2019)	3	1	1	3	1	3
Sydney FC	Football Australia	12	2014	2026	Champions (2017, 2023)	2	2	2	3	1	2
Melbourne Victory	Football Australia	11	2014	2026	Champions (2015, 2021)	2	2	1	1	2	3
Macarthur FC	Football Australia	6	2021	2026	Champions (2022, 2024)	2			1	2	1
Melbourne City	Football Australia	12	2014	2026	Champions (2016)	1	1	2	3	2	3
South Melbourne	Football Victoria	6	2015	2026	Champions (2026)	1		2	1	1	1
Newcastle Jets	Football Australia	10	2014	2026	Champions (2025)	1			1	2	6
Perth Glory	Football Australia	9	2014	2026	Runners-up (2014, 2015)		2			2	5
Central Coast Mariners	Football Australia	11	2014	2026	Runners-up (2021)		1	2			8
Brisbane Roar	Football Australia	10	2014	2026	Runners-up (2023)		1	1	1	3	4
Heidelberg United	Football Victoria	8	2015	2026	Runners-up (2025)		1		4	2	1
Sydney United 58	Football NSW	9	2014	2026	Runners-up (2022)		1			7	1
Western Sydney Wanderers	Football Australia	11	2014	2026	Semi-finals (2017, 2018)			2	5	3	1
Bentleigh Greens	Football Victoria	5	2014	2022	Semi-finals (2014, 2018)			2	1	1	1
Wellington Phoenix	Football Australia	11	2014	2025	Semi-finals (2021)			1	2	2	6
Hume City	Football Victoria	6	2015	2024	Semi-finals (2015)			1	2	2	1
Oakleigh Cannons	Football Victoria	4	2015	2024	Semi-finals (2022)			1	2		1
Avondale FC	Football Victoria	4	2018	2025	Semi-finals (2025)			1	1	2	
Lions FC	Football Queensland	6	2015	2026	Semi-finals (2026)			1		4	1
Brisbane Strikers	Football Queensland	4	2014	2019	Semi-finals (2019)			1		2	1
Melbourne Knights	Football Victoria	4	2014	2023	Semi-finals (2023)			1		1	2
Canberra Olympic	Capital Football	2	2016	2017	Semi-finals (2016)			1			1
Auckland FC	Football Australia	1	2025		Semi-finals (2025)			1			
APIA Leichhardt (Note: In the first six editions of the FFA Cup (2014–2019) APIA Leichhardt were known as APIA Leichhardt Tigers until they dropped the "Tigers" moniker ahead of the 2020 season.)	Football NSW	7	2017	2026	Quarter-finals (2018, 2021, 2026)				3	3	1
Gold Coast City (Note: In the first two editions of the FFA Cup (2014 and 2015) Gold Coast City were known as Palm Beach until the launch of Gold Coast City which retained the history of Palm Beach.)	Football Queensland	3	2014	2017	Quarter-finals (2014, 2017)				2	1	
Blacktown City	Football NSW	6	2014	2024	Quarter-finals (2016, 2017)				2		4
North Eastern MetroStars	Football South Australia	5	2015	2025	Quarter-finals (2023)				1	2	2
Western United	Football Australia	4	2021	2025	Quarter-finals (2023)				1	1	2
Adelaide City	Football South Australia	3	2014	2022	Quarter-finals (2014)				1	1	1
Brisbane City	Football Queensland	3	2022	2025	Quarter-finals (2025)				1	1	1
Moreton City Excelsior (Note: In the first two entries of the FFA Cup that they participated in (2017 and 2023) Moreton City Excelsior were known as Moreton Bay United until their merger with Albany Creek Excelsior and resulting name change ahead of the 2024 season.)	Football Queensland	3	2017	2024	Quarter-finals (2024)				1	1	1
Brunswick Juventus (Note: In the first edition of the FFA Cup (2019) were known as Moreland Zebras until their name change ahead of the 2022 season.) (Note: This team was established in 1997 as breakaway club based in Fawkner, Victoria and is not associate with Brunswick Zebras.)	Football Victoria	2	2019	2026	Quarter-finals (2019)				1	1	
Green Gully	Football Victoria	2	2016	2022	Quarter-finals (2016)				1	1	
Peninsula Power	Football Queensland	6	2017	2026	Quarter-finals (2022)				1		5
SD Raiders	Football NSW	2	2025	2026	Quarter-finals (2026)				1		1
North Sunshine Eagles	Football Victoria	1	2026		Quarter-finals (2026)				1		
Preston Lions	Football Victoria	1	2026		Quarter-finals (2026)				1		
Olympic FC	Football Queensland	5	2014	2025	Round of 16 (2014, 2019, 2024)					3	2
Edgeworth Eagles (Note: In the first six editions of the FFA/Australia Cup (2015–2017, 2019, 2023–2024) were known as Edgeworth FC until they return name the "Eagles" moniker ahead of the 2026 season.)	Northern NSW Football	6	2015	2024	Round of 16 (2016, 2019)					2	4
Devonport City	Football Tasmania	4	2016	2023	Round of 16 (2016, 2018)					2	2
Gold Coast Knights	Football Queensland	4	2018	2025	Round of 16 (2021, 2023)					2	2
Sydney Olympic	Football NSW	4	2014	2026	Round of 16 (2014, 2015)					2	2
Bonnyrigg White Eagles	Football NSW	3	2016	2022	Round of 16 (2016, 2018)					2	1
Adelaide Olympic	Football South Australia	2	2019	2021	Round of 16 (2019, 2021)					2	
Olympic Kingsway	Football West	2	2024	2025	Round of 16 (2024, 2025)					2	
Broadmeadow Magic	Northern NSW Football	7	2014	2023	Round of 16 (2018)					1	6
Cairns FC (Note: In the first four editions of the FFA Cup (2014–2017) Cairns FC were known as Far North Queensland until their name change ahead of the 2018 season.)	Football Queensland	5	2014	2018	Round of 16 (2018)					1	4
Campbelltown City	Football South Australia	3	2019	2024	Round of 16 (2023)					1	2
Hakoah Sydney City East	Football NSW	3	2014	2018	Round of 16 (2017)					1	2
Manly United	Football NSW	3	2014	2019	Round of 16 (2019)					1	2
Marconi Stallions	Football NSW	3	2016	2019	Round of 16 (2019)					1	2
Mt Druitt Town Rangers	Football NSW	3	2019	2023	Round of 16 (2023)					1	2
Rockdale Ilinden (Note: In the first two entries of the FFA Cup that they participated in Rockdale Ilinden were known as Rockdale City Suns until their name change ahead of the 2021 season.)	Football NSW	3	2015	2024	Round of 16 (2015)					1	2
Wollongong Wolves (Note: In the first edition of the FFA Cup (2014) Wollongong Wolves were known as South Coast Wolves.)	Football NSW	3	2014	2021	Round of 16 (2021)					1	2
Mackay & Whitsundays Magpies Crusaders United	Football Queensland	2	2019	2022	Round of 16 (2019)					1	1
Modbury Jets	Football South Australia	2	2022	2024	Round of 16 (2022)					1	1
North West Sydney Spirit	Football NSW	2	2022	2024	Round of 16 (2024)					1	1
Sorrento FC	Football West	2	2015	2017	Round of 16 (2017)					1	1
Adelaide Comets	Football South Australia	1	2018		Round of 16 (2018)					1	
Bankstown Berries	Football NSW	1	2017		Round of 16 (2017)					1	
Cooks Hill United	Northern NSW Football	1	2025		Round of 16 (2025)					1	
Fremantle City	Football West	1	2026		Round of 16 (2026)					1	
Inter Lions	Football NSW	1	2023		Round of 16 (2023)					1	
Melbourne Srbija	Football Victoria	1	2024		Round of 16 (2024)					1	
Nunawading City	Football Victoria	1	2025		Round of 16 (2025)					1	
Redlands United	Football Queensland	1	2016		Round of 16 (2016)					1	
South Springvale	Football Victoria	1	2014		Round of 16 (2014)					1	
St Albans Saints	Football Victoria	1	2014		Round of 16 (2014)					1	
Tuggeranong United	Capital Football	1	2014		Round of 16 (2014)					1	
Floreat Athena	Football West	4	2016	2023	Round of 32 (2016, 2019, 2021, 2023)						4
South Hobart	Football Tasmania	4	2014	2025	Round of 32 (2014, 2015, 2019, 2025)						4
Bayswater City	Football West	3	2014	2026	Round of 32 (2014, 2019, 2026)						3
Canberra Croatia (Note: In the first edition of the FFA Cup they participated in (2018) Canberra Croatia were known as Canberra FC until their name change ahead of the 2020 season.)	Capital Football	3	2018	2025	Round of 32 (2018, 2023, 2025)						3
Darwin Olympic	Football Northern Territory	3	2015	2025	Round of 32 (2015, 2019, 2025)						3
Tigers FC (Note: In the first 2 edition of the FFA Cup (2019) & (2021) were known as Cooma Tigers FC/Tigers FC.)	Capital Football	3	2019	2026	Round of 32 (2019, 2021, 2026)						3
Armadale SC	Football West	2	2018	2022	Round of 32 (2018, 2022)						2
Cockburn City	Football West	2	2016	2022	Round of 32 (2016, 2022)						2
Darwin Rovers	Football Northern Territory	2	2016	2017	Round of 32 (2016, 2017)						2
Hellenic Athletic	Football Northern Territory	2	2018	2023	Round of 32 (2018, 2023)						2
Lambton Jaffas	Northern NSW Football	2	2016	2024	Round of 32 (2016, 2024)						2
Maitland FC	Northern NSW Football	2	2019	2026	Round of 32 (2019, 2026)						2
Newcastle Olympic	Northern NSW Football	2	2021	2022	Round of 32 (2021, 2022)						2
Northcote City	Football Victoria	2	2018	2023	Round of 32 (2018, 2023)						2
Perth RedStar (Note: In the first edition of the FFA Cup they participated in (2021) Perth RedStar were known as ECU Joondalup until their merger with Northern Redbacks and resulting name change ahead of the 2022 season.)	Football West	2	2021	2024	Round of 32 (2021, 2024)						2
Port Melbourne	Football Victoria	2	2018	2021	Round of 32 (2018, 2021)						2
Stirling Macedonia (Note: In the first edition of the FFA Cup they participated in (2014) Stirling Macedonia were known as Stirling Lions until their name change ahead of the 2021 season.)	Football West	2	2014	2025	Round of 32 (2014, 2025)						2
Weston Bears	Northern NSW Football	2	2025	2026	Round of 32 (2025, 2026)						2
Adelaide Croatia Raiders	Football South Australia	1	2025		Round of 32 (2025)						1
Balmain Tigers	Football NSW	1	2015		Round of 32 (2015)						1
Bulleen Lions	Football Victoria	1	2019		Round of 32 (2019)						1
Casuarina FC	Football Northern Territory	1	2021		Round of 32 (2021)						1
Charlestown City Blues	Northern NSW Football	1	2018		Round of 32 (2018)						1
Coomera Colts	Football Queensland	1	2019		Round of 32 (2019)						1
Croydon Kings	Football South Australia	1	2015		Round of 32 (2015)						1
Darwin Hearts	Football Northern Territory	1	2024		Round of 32 (2024)						1
Edge Hill United	Football Queensland	1	2021		Round of 32 (2021)						1
Glenorchy Knights	Football Tasmania	1	2024		Round of 32 (2024)						1
Goulburn Valley Suns	Football Victoria	1	2023		Round of 32 (2023)						1
Gungahlin United	Capital Football	1	2015		Round of 32 (2015)						1
Gwelup Croatia	Football West	1	2018		Round of 32 (2018)						1
Hills Brumbies	Football NSW	1	2017		Round of 32 (2017)						1
Inglewood United	Football West	1	2023		Round of 32 (2023)						1
Logan Lightning	Football Queensland	1	2022		Round of 32 (2022)						1
Mindil Aces	Football Northern Territory	1	2022		Round of 32 (2022)						1
Monaro Panthers	Capital Football	1	2022		Round of 32 (2022)						1
Northern Tigers	Football NSW	1	2025		Round of 32 (2025)						1
O'Connor Knights	Capital Football	1	2024		Round of 32 (2024)						1
Olympia FC	Football Tasmania	1	2017		Round of 32 (2017)						1
Parramatta FC	Football NSW	1	2014		Round of 32 (2014)						1
Perth SC	Football West	1	2015		Round of 32 (2015)						1
South Cardiff	Northern NSW Football	1	2014		Round of 32 (2014)						1
St George FC	Football NSW	1	2019		Round of 32 (2019)						1
Surfers Paradise Apollo	Football Queensland	1	2016		Round of 32 (2016)						1
Western Knights	Football West	1	2017		Round of 32 (2017)						1
Wollongong United	Football NSW	1	2022		Round of 32 (2022)						1
Azzurri United	Football Northern Territory	1	2026		Round of 32 (2026)						1
Cumberland United	Football South Australia	1	2026		Round of 32 (2026)						1
FK Beograd	Football South Australia	1	2026		Round of 32 (2026)						1
Kingborough Lions United	Football Tasmania	1	2026		Round of 32 (2026)						1
Marlin Coast Rangers	Football Queensland	1	2026		Round of 32 (2026)						1
Rochedale Rovers	Football Queensland	1	2026		Round of 32 (2026)						1

== See also ==
- List of Australian Cup Winners
