= 2019 Football Northern Territory season =

Football Northern Territory
- Season: 2019

The 2019 Football Northern Territory season in Northern Territory. The men's competitions consisted of three major divisions across the State.

== League table ==
=== 2019 NorZone Premier League ===
The season began on 29 March, concluding with the Grand Final on 28 September.

Pos	Team	Pld	W	D	L	GF	GA	GD	Pts	Qualification
1	Casuarina FC (C)	20	13	2	5	55	30	+25	41	Qualification to Final Series
2	Mindil Aces	20	9	5	6	41	40	+1	32	Qualification to Final Series
3	Uni Azzurri	20	9	3	8	36	41	−5	30	Qualification to Final Series
4	Darwin Olympic	20	10	4	6	55	38	+17	34	Qualification to Final Series
5	Hellenic Athletic	20	7	2	11	48	46	+2	23	
6	Port Darwin	20	3	2	15	25	65	−40	11	

Source: mygameday
Rules for classification: 1) Points won; 2) Total goal difference; 3) Total goals scored;
(C) Champions

=== Finals series ===
Semi-finals
1	Casuarina FC	1
2	Mindil Aces	0
3	Uni Azzurri	1
4	Darwin Olympic	4

Preliminary Final
Mindil Aces	4
Darwin Olympic	3

Grand Final
Casuarina FC	3
Mindil Aces	1

=== 2019 NorZone Division One ===
The season began on 29 March, concluding with the Grand Final on 22 September.

Pos	Team	Pld	W	D	L	GF	GA	GD	Pts
1	Darwin Hearts A (C)	16	13	2	1	45	16	+29	41
2	Hellenic Athletic	16	12	1	3	41	20	+21	37
3	Uni Azzurri	16	9	3	4	44	23	+21	30
4	Litchfield	16	9	2	5	29	19	+10	29
5	Port Darwin	16	6	1	9	21	34	−13	19
6	Garuda	16	5	2	9	33	36	−3	17
7	Mindil Aces	16	5	1	10	29	45	−16	16
8	Palmerston Rovers	16	3	3	10	25	46	−21	12
9	Darwin Hearts B	16	2	1	13	26	54	−28	7

Source: mygameday
Rules for classification: 1) Points won; 2) Total goal difference; 3) Total goals scored;
(C) Champions

=== Finals series ===
Semi-finals
1	Darwin Hearts A	0
2	Hellenic Athletic	2
3	Uni Azzurri	0 (3)
4	Litchfield	0 (4)

Preliminary Final
Darwin Hearts A	2
Litchfield	1

Grand Final
Hellenic Athletic	0 (2)
Darwin Hearts A	0 (4)

=== 2019 Southern Zone Premier League ===
The season began on 27 April, concluding with the Grand Final on 7 September.

Pos	Team	Pld	W	D	L	GF	GA	GD	Pts
1	Verdi FC	15	9	4	2	38	22	+16	31
2	MPH Vikings FC (C)	15	7	4	4	39	29	+10	25
3	Alice Springs Celtic	15	6	3	6	38	32	+6	21
4	Stormbirds SC	15	2	1	12	18	50	−32	7

Source: mygameday
Rules for classification: 1) Points won; 2) Total goal difference; 3) Total goals scored;
(C) Champions

Notes

1. 2 more losses than wins as one match (Verdi vs Celtic) was awarded loss against both.

=== Finals series ===
Semi-finals
1	Verdi FC	0
2	MPH Vikings FC	2
3	Alice Springs Celtic	6
4	Stormbirds SC	1

Preliminary Final
Verdi FC	2
Alice Springs Celtic	1

Grand Final
MPH Vikings FC	3
Verdi FC	2
