= 2021 Football Northern Territory season =

Football Northern Territory
- Season: 2021

The 2021 Football Northern Territory season in Northern Territory. The men's competitions consisted of three major divisions across the State.

== League table ==
=== 2021 NorZone Premier League ===
The season began on 9 April, concluding with the Grand Final on 25 September.

Pos	Team	Pld	W	D	L	GF	GA	GD	Pts	Qualification
1	Hellenic Athletic	18	13	2	3	46	22	+24	41	Qualification to Final Series
2	Uni Azzurri	18	9	4	5	43	27	+16	31	Qualification to Final Series
3	Casuarina FC	18	9	3	6	34	22	+12	30	Qualification to Final Series
4	Mindil Aces (C)	18	8	4	6	41	27	+14	28	Qualification to Final Series
5	Darwin Olympic	18	9	1	8	40	28	+12	28	
6	Port Darwin	18	6	3	9	27	34	−7	21	
7	Darwin Hearts	18	0	1	17	9	80	−71	1	

Source: mygameday
Rules for classification: 1) Points won; 2) Total goal difference; 3) Total goals scored;
(C) Champions

=== Finals series ===
Semi-finals
1	Hellenic Athletic	0
4	Mindil Aces	1
2	Uni Azzurri	2
3	Casuarina FC	0

Grand Final
Mindil Aces	2
Uni Azzurri	1

=== 2021 NorZone Division One ===
The season began on 9 April, concluding with the Grand Final on 18 September.

Pos	Team	Pld	W	D	L	GF	GA	GD	Pts	Qualification
1	Hellenic Athletic (C)	16	12	2	2	48	12	+36	38	Qualification to Final Series
2	Uni Azzurri	16	12	1	3	44	22	+22	37	Qualification to Final Series
3	Port Darwin	16	8	4	4	47	28	+19	28	Qualification to Final Series
4	Mindil Aces	16	7	4	5	34	27	+7	25	Qualification to Final Series
5	Garuda	16	6	2	8	25	35	−10	20	
6	Darwin Olympic	16	6	2	8	24	39	−15	20	
7	Port Darwin (FWB)	16	3	1	12	27	45	−18	10	
8	Palmerston Rovers	16	2	0	14	18	59	−41	6	

Source: mygameday
Rules for classification: 1) Points won; 2) Total goal difference; 3) Total goals scored;
(C) Champions

=== Finals series ===
Semi-finals
1	Hellenic Athletic	2
4	Mindil Aces	0
2	Uni Azzurri	3
3	Port Darwin	0

Grand Final
Hellenic Athletic	1
Uni Azzurri	0

=== 2021 Southern Zone Premier League ===
The season began on 17 April, concluding with the Grand Final on 11 September.

Pos	Team	Pld	W	D	L	GF	GA	GD	Pts
1	Verdi FC (C)	18	16	2	0	60	15	+45	50
2	MPH Vikings FC	18	8	3	7	46	41	+5	27
3	Alice Springs Celtic	18	5	4	9	41	44	−3	19
4	Gillen Scorpions FC	18	1	3	14	14	61	−47	6

Source: mygameday
Rules for classification: 1) Points won; 2) Total goal difference; 3) Total goals scored;
(C) Champions

=== Finals series ===
Semi-finals
1	Verdi FC	4
2	MPH Vikings FC	0
3	Alice Springs Celtic	2
4	Gillen Scorpions FC	1

Preliminary Final
MPH Vikings FC	2
Alice Springs Celtic	0

Grand Final
Verdi FC	1
MPH Vikings FC	0
