= 2019 FFA Cup =

2019 season of Australia's national knockout soccer competition

Tournament details
- Country: Australia; New Zealand
- Dates: 9 February – 23 October 2019
- Teams: 736

Final positions
- Champions: Adelaide United (3rd title)
- Runners-up: Melbourne City

Tournament statistics
- Matches played: 31
- Goals scored: 124 (4 per match)
- Attendance: 83,217 (2,684 per match)
- Top goal scorer: Jamie Maclaren (6 goals)

The 2019 FFA Cup was the sixth season of the FFA Cup (now known as the Australia Cup), the main national soccer knockout cup competition in Australia. 32 teams contested the competition proper (from the round of 32), including 10 of the 11 A-League teams (with Western United not competing in their inaugural season) and 21 Football Federation Australia (FFA) member federation teams determined through individual state qualifying rounds, as well as the reigning National Premier Leagues Champion (Campbelltown City from South Australia).

== Round and dates ==
Round	Draw date	Match dates	Number of fixtures	Teams	New entries this round
Preliminary rounds	Various	9 February–25 June 2019	705 + 164 byes	736 → 32	725
Round of 32	26 June 2019	24 July–7 August 2019	16	32 → 16	11
Round of 16	7 August 2019	21–28 August 2019	8	16 → 8	none
Quarter-finals	28 August 2019	17–18 September 2019	4	8 → 4	none
Semi-finals	18 September 2019	1–2 October 2019	2	4 → 2	none
Final	2 October 2019	23 October 2019	1	2 → 1	none

== Teams ==
A total of 32 teams participated in the 2019 FFA Cup competition proper, ten of which are from the A-League, one the 2018 National Premier Leagues Champion (Campbelltown City), and the remaining 21 teams from FFA member federations, as determined by the qualifying rounds. The two new expansion A-League clubs – Western United and Macarthur FC – were deemed ineligible for the competition this year.

A-League clubs represent the highest level in the Australian league system, whereas member federation clubs come from Level 2 and below. The current season tier of member federation clubs is shown in parentheses.

A-League clubs
Adelaide United	Brisbane Roar	Central Coast Mariners	Melbourne City
Melbourne Victory	Newcastle Jets	Perth Glory	Sydney FC
Wellington Phoenix	Western Sydney Wanderers		
Member federation clubs
(Australian Capital Territory) Tigers FC (2)	(New South Wales) Manly United (2)	(New South Wales) Marconi Stallions (2)	(New South Wales) Mt Druitt Town Rangers (2)
(New South Wales) St George FC (3)	(New South Wales) Sydney United 58 (2)	(New South Wales) Edgeworth FC (2)	(New South Wales) Maitland FC (2)
(Northern Territory) Darwin Olympic (2)	(Queensland) Brisbane Strikers (2)	(Queensland) Coomera Colts (4)	(Queensland) Magpies Crusaders United (2)
(Queensland) Olympic FC (2)	(South Australia) Adelaide Olympic (2)	(South Australia) Campbelltown City (2)	(Tasmania) South Hobart (2)
(Victoria (state)) Bulleen Lions (3)	(Victoria (state)) Hume City (2)	(Victoria (state)) Melbourne Knights (2)	(Victoria (state)) Moreland Zebras (3)
(Western Australia) Bayswater City (2)	(Western Australia) Floreat Athena (2)		

== Prize fund ==
The prize fund was unchanged from the previous three years' events.

Round	No. of Clubs receive fund	Prize fund
Round of 16	8	$2,000
Quarter-finalists	4	$5,000
Semi-finalists	2	$10,000
Final runners-up	1	$25,000
Final winner	1	$50,000
Total		$131,000

== Preliminary rounds ==
FFA member federations teams compete in various state-based preliminary rounds to win one of 21 places in the competition proper (round of 32). All Australian clubs (other than youth teams associated with A-League franchises) were eligible to enter the qualifying process through their respective FFA member federation, however only one team per club is permitted entry in the competition. The preliminary rounds operate within a consistent national structure whereby club entry into the competition is staggered in each state/territory, ultimately leading to round 7 with the winning clubs from that round gaining direct entry into the round of 32

The format for Queensland was restructured in 2019, whereby the Central & Northern Queensland region competes for one place, and South East Queensland competes for three places.

The first matches of the preliminary rounds began in February 2019, and the final matches of the preliminary rounds scheduled was completed in June 2019.

Federation	Associated Competition	Round of 32 Qualifiers
ACT	Federation Cup	1
NSW	Waratah Cup	5
Northern NSW	—	2
NT	Sport Minister's Cup	1
Queensland	—	4
SA	Federation Cup	1
Tasmania	Milan Lakoseljac Cup	1
Victoria	Dockerty Cup	4
WA	State Cup	2

== Bracket ==
Round of 32
Adelaide Olympic	4
Floreat Athena	3
Tigers FC	0
Hume City	2
Sydney FC	0
Brisbane Roar	2
Maitland FC	0
Central Coast Mariners	2
Olympic FC	5
Bayswater City	2
Melbourne Knights	2
Adelaide United	5
Darwin Olympic	0
Edgeworth FC	3
Melbourne Victory	2
Newcastle Jets	3
Brisbane Strikers (p)	2 (4)
Wellington Phoenix	2 (2)
Mt Druitt Town Rangers	2 (2)
Manly United (p)	2 (4)
Bulleen Lions	1 (2)
Moreland Zebras (p)	1 (3)
Magpies Crusaders United	2
Coomera Colts	1
South Hobart	0
Marconi Stallions	3
Campbelltown City	1
Melbourne City	3
St George	3
Sydney United 58 (a.e.t.)	5
Perth Glory	1
Western Sydney Wanderers	2

Round of 16
Adelaide Olympic	1
Hume City	3
Brisbane Roar	2 (2)
Central Coast Mariners (p)	2 (4)
Olympic FC	2
Adelaide United	3
Edgeworth FC	1
Newcastle Jets	5
Brisbane Strikers	1
Manly United	0
Moreland Zebras	4
Magpies Crusaders United	0
Marconi Stallions	1
Melbourne City	2
Sydney United 58	1
Western Sydney Wanderers	7

Quarter-finals
Hume City	0
Central Coast Mariners	1
Adelaide United	1
Newcastle Jets	0
Brisbane Strikers	3
Moreland Zebras	2
Melbourne City	3
Western Sydney Wanderers	0

Semi-finals
Central Coast Mariners	1
Adelaide United	2
Brisbane Strikers	1
Melbourne City	5

Final
Adelaide United	4
Melbourne City	0

== Round of 32 ==
The Round of 32 draw took place on 26 June 2019, with match information confirmed on 28 June 2019.

The lowest ranked side that qualified for this round were Coomera Colts. They were the only level 4 team left in the competition.

All times listed below are at AEST

24 July 2019	Olympic FC (2)	5–2	Bayswater City (2)	Perry Park, Brisbane
19:30	Lucas 24', 45' (pen.), 56'; A. Smith 35'; Lofthouse 59'	Report	G. Smith 60'; Griffiths 88'	Attendance: 917; Referee: Ben Abraham

24 July 2019	Adelaide Olympic (2)	4–3	Floreat Athena (2)	VALO Football Centre, Adelaide
19:30	Erba 54', 64'; Simosis 61', 78' (pen.)	Report	Boi 26'; Evans 43', 72'	Attendance: 1,028; Referee: Daniel Elder

24 July 2019	Darwin Olympic (2)	0–3	Edgeworth FC (2)	Darwin Football Stadium, Darwin
19:30		Report	Smith 15'; Gardner 27'; Cawley 72'	Attendance: 1,195; Referee: Lara Lee

24 July 2019	Bulleen Lions (3)	1–1 (a.e.t.) (2–3 p)	Moreland Zebras (3)	David Barro Stadium, Melbourne
19:30	Luttmer 107'	Report	Sadler 94'	Attendance: 1,356; Referee: Jack Morgan
	Penalties
	Luttmer (penalty scored); Petreski (penalty missed); MacLennan (penalty missed); Everson (penalty scored); Apostolopoulos (penalty missed); Mullett (penalty missed)		(penalty missed) Watson; (penalty missed) Cardamone; (penalty missed) Barforosh; (penalty scored) Cannell; (penalty scored) Gai; (penalty scored) Williams

24 July 2019	Magpies Crusaders United (2)	2–1	Coomera Colts (4)	Sologinkin Oval, Mackay
19:30	Lyall 39'; Walters 75'	Report	Pemberton 87'	Attendance: 732; Referee: Chris Beath

24 July 2019	Mt Druitt Town Rangers (2)	2–2 (a.e.t.) (2–4 p)	Manly United (2)	Popondetta Park, Sydney
19:30	Alameddine 6'; Roberts 110'	Report	Pandurevic 2'; McCarthy 95'	Attendance: 714; Referee: Stephen Lucas
	Penalties
	Fernández (penalty scored); Roberts (penalty missed); Boyadjian (penalty missed); Saliadarre (penalty scored)		(penalty scored) Cholakian; (penalty scored) Pandurevic; (penalty missed) McCarthy; (penalty scored) Ferguson; (penalty scored) Mendy

31 July 2019	Campbelltown City (2)	1–3	Melbourne City (1)	Steve Woodcock Sports Centre, Adelaide
19:30	Fyfe 26' (pen.)	Report	Maclaren 11', 90+3'; Noone 31'	Attendance: 3,078; Referee: Adam Bavcar

31 July 2019	Maitland FC (2)	0–2	Central Coast Mariners (1)	Maitland Sportsground, Maitland
19:30		Report	McGlinchey 8', 11'	Attendance: 2,777; Referee: Stephen Laurie

31 July 2019	Tigers FC (2)	0–2	Hume City (2)	Deakin Stadium, Canberra
19:30		Report	Ochieng 6'; Bowler 32'	Attendance: 855; Referee: Tim Danaskos

31 July 2019	South Hobart (2)	0–3	Marconi Stallions (2)	Blundstone Arena, Hobart
19:30		Report	Jesic 36' (pen.); Ludford 40' (o.g.); Tsekenis 89'	Attendance: 2,617; Referee: Jonathan Barreiro

31 July 2019	St George (3)	3–5 (a.e.t.)	Sydney United 58 (2)	Ilinden Sports Centre, Sydney
19:30	Kokobu 63', 90+6'; Beattie 78'	Report	Antelmi 18'; Macdonald 50'; Perkatis 90+3'; Maia 108'; Ruhs 112'	Attendance: 800; Referee: Simon Hooper

7 August 2019	Melbourne Knights (2)	2–5	Adelaide United (1)	Knights Stadium, Melbourne
19:30	Albano 28'; Brice 72'	Report	Toure 12'; Halloran 24', 75'; N. Konstandopoulos 56'; McGree 60'	Attendance: 4,087; Referee: Lachlan Keevers

7 August 2019	Brisbane Strikers (2)	2–2 (a.e.t.) (4–2 p)	Wellington Phoenix (1)	Perry Park, Brisbane
19:30	Omori 25'; Pengelly 54'	Report	Devlin 58'; McCowatt 71'	Attendance: 1,612; Referee: Alex King
	Penalties
	Pengelly (penalty scored); Omori (penalty scored); Maltby (penalty scored); Hills (penalty scored)		(penalty scored) Cacace; (penalty missed) Ball; (penalty missed) McCowatt; (penalty scored) Rufer

7 August 2019	Melbourne Victory (1)	2–3 (a.e.t.)	Newcastle Jets (1)	AAMI Park, Melbourne
19:30	Nabbout 45+1', 61'	Report	Koutroumbis 74'; D. Petratos 81'; Langlois 113'	Attendance: 4,045; Referee: Shaun Evans

7 August 2019	Sydney FC (1)	0–2	Brisbane Roar (1)	Leichhardt Oval, Sydney
19:30		Report	Mauk 41'; O'Shea 47'	Attendance: 2,350; Referee: Katie Patterson

7 August 2019	Perth Glory (1)	1–2 (a.e.t.)	Western Sydney Wanderers (1)	Dorrien Gardens, Perth
20:30	Mrcela 114'	Report	Adam 109'; Yeboah 117'	Attendance: 1,587; Referee: Adam Fielding

== Round of 16 ==
The Round of 16 draw took place on 7 August and match information was confirmed on 9 August.

The lowest ranked side that qualified for this round were Moreland Zebras. They were the only level 3 team left in the competition.

All times listed below are at AEST

21 August 2019	Edgeworth FC (2)	1–5	Newcastle Jets (1)	Jack McLaughlan Oval, Newcastle
19:30	McBreen 16'	Report	Arroyo 9'; Hoolahan 38'; D. Petratos 40' (pen.), 77'; Fitzgerald 61'	Attendance: 4,297; Referee: Ben Abraham

21 August 2019	Marconi Stallions (2)	1–2	Melbourne City (1)	Marconi Stadium, Sydney
19:30	Fernandez 84'	Report	Maclaren 2'; Noone 44'	Attendance: 1,947; Referee: Stephen Lucas

21 August 2019	Olympic FC (2)	2–3	Adelaide United (1)	Perry Park, Brisbane
19:30	Psaros 12'; Lucas 64' (pen.)	Report	Toure 9', 27'; Blackwood 84' (pen.)	Attendance: 1,030; Referee: Chris Beath

21 August 2019	Moreland Zebras (3)	4–0	Magpies Crusaders United (2)	CB Smith Reserve, Melbourne
19:30	Barforosh 18', 27'; Sadler 54'; Cannell 75'	Report		Attendance: 1,325; Referee: Shaun Evans

28 August 2019	Sydney United 58 (2)	1–7	Western Sydney Wanderers (1)	Campbelltown Stadium, Sydney
19:30	Antelmi 50' (pen.)	Report	Kamau 16'; Georgievski 22', 82'; Yeboah 37'; Bilic 57' (o.g.); Russell 72'; Majewski 79'	Attendance: 5,061; Referee: Kurt Ams

28 August 2019	Brisbane Strikers (2)	1–0	Manly United (2)	Perry Park, Brisbane
19:30	Richardson 62'	Report		Attendance: 1,240; Referee: Adam Kersey

28 August 2019	Adelaide Olympic (2)	1–3	Hume City (2)	VALO Football Centre, Adelaide
19:00 ACST	Kamara 23'	Report	Delic 32', 60', 71'	Attendance: 1,389; Referee: Jonathan Barreiro

28 August 2019	Brisbane Roar (1)	2–2 (a.e.t.) (2–4 p)	Central Coast Mariners (1)	Dolphin Stadium, Brisbane
19:30	Inman 47'; O'Donovan 87' (pen.)	Report	Simon 21' (pen.); Silvera 85'	Attendance: 6,235; Referee: Alex King
	Penalties
	O'Neill (penalty scored); Gillesphey (penalty scored); O'Donovan (penalty missed); Aldred (penalty missed)		(penalty scored) Simon; (penalty scored) Stensness; (penalty scored) Đurić; (penalty scored) Melling

== Quarter-finals ==
The quarter-finals draw took place on 28 August, with match details announced the following day.

The lowest ranked club that qualified for this round were Moreland Zebras. They were the only level 3 team left in the competition.

All times listed below are at AEST

17 September 2019	Hume City (2)	0–1	Central Coast Mariners (1)	ABD Stadium, Melbourne
19:30		Report	Majok 90+2'	Attendance: 1,928; Referee: Kurt Ams

17 September 2019	Adelaide United (1)	1–0	Newcastle Jets (1)	Coopers Stadium, Adelaide
19:30	Toure 42'	Report		Attendance: 4,807; Referee: Daniel Elder

18 September 2019	Melbourne City (1)	3–0	Western Sydney Wanderers (1)	AAMI Park, Melbourne
19:30	Noone 34', 81'; Maclaren 44'	Report		Attendance: 2,905; Referee: Stephen Lucas

18 September 2019	Brisbane Strikers (2)	3–2	Moreland Zebras (3)	Perry Park, Brisbane
19:30	Hills 27'; Palmer 43', 57'	Report	Barforosh 55'; Williams 82'	Attendance: 1,915; Referee: Chris Beath

== Semi-finals ==
The semi-finals draw took place on 18 September, with match details confirmed the following day.

The lowest ranked side that qualified for this round were the Brisbane Strikers. They were the only level 2 team remaining in the competition.

All times listed below are at AEST

1 October 2019	Brisbane Strikers (2)	1–5	Melbourne City (1)	Perry Park, Brisbane
19:30	Pengelly 3'	Report	Metcalfe 30'; Maclaren 48', 80'; Cabrera 62'; Galloway 90+2'	Attendance: 3,706; Referee: Adam Kersey

2 October 2019	Central Coast Mariners (1)	1–2	Adelaide United (1)	Central Coast Stadium, Gosford
19:30	Clisby 63'	Report	Blackwood 74'; McGree 90'	Attendance: 5,572; Referee: Shaun Evans

== Final ==
23 October 2019
19:30 AEDT

Adelaide United (1)	4–0	Melbourne City (1)
Toure 25'; Halloran 49'; Mileusnic 60'; McGree 75'	Report

Coopers Stadium, Adelaide
Attendance: 14,920
Referee: Alex King

== Individual honours ==
The recipient of the Michael Cockerill Medal to recognise the tournament's standout National Premier Leagues performer was Fraser Hills from Brisbane Strikers FC. Al Hassan Toure from Adelaide United won the Mark Viduka Medal for the player of the match in the final.

== Top goalscorers ==
Rank	Player	Club	Goals
1	(Australia) Jamie Maclaren	Melbourne City	6
2	(Australia) Al Hassan Toure	Adelaide United	5
3	(Australia) Chris Lucas	Olympic FC	4
3	(England) Craig Noone	Melbourne City	4
5	(Australia) Thomas Barforosh	Moreland Zebras	3
5	(Australia) Marko Delic	Hume City	3
5	(Australia) Ben Halloran	Adelaide United	3
5	(Australia) Riley McGree	Adelaide United	3
5	(Australia) Dimitri Petratos	Newcastle Jets	3
10	12 Players	Various	2

Note: Goals scored in preliminary rounds not included.

== Broadcasting rights ==
The live television rights for the competition were held by the subscription network Fox Sports. From the round of 32 onwards all matches were broadcast online on the My Football Live app. Fox Sports also broadcast ten games live, including the final.
