= 2017 FFA Cup =

2017 season of Australia's national knockout soccer competition

Tournament details
- Country: Australia; New Zealand
- Dates: 10 February – 21 November 2017
- Teams: 735

Final positions
- Champions: Sydney FC (1st title)
- Runners-up: Adelaide United

Tournament statistics
- Matches played: 31
- Goals scored: 118 (3.81 per match)
- Attendance: 85,472 (2,757 per match)
- Top goal scorer: Bobô (8 goals)

The 2017 FFA Cup was the fourth season of the FFA Cup (now known as the Australia Cup), the main national soccer knockout cup competition in Australia. 32 teams began competing in the competition proper (from the round of 32), including the 10 A-League teams and 21 Football Federation Australia (FFA) member federation teams determined through individual state qualifying rounds, as well as the reigning National Premier Leagues Champion (Sydney United 58 from NSW).

== Round and dates ==
Round	Draw date	Match date	Number of fixtures	Teams	New entries this round
Preliminary rounds	Various	10 February–24 June 2017	703 + 25 byes	735 → 32	724
Round of 32	29 June 2017	26 July–9 August 2017	16	32 → 16	11
Round of 16	9 August 2017	23–29 August 2017	8	16 → 8	none
Quarter-finals	29 August 2017	13–20 September 2017	4	8 → 4	none
Semi-finals	20 September 2017	11–24 October 2017	2	4 → 2	none
Final	26 October 2017	21 November 2017	1	2 → 1	none

== Prize fund ==
The prize fund is unchanged from the 2016 event.

Round	No. of Clubs receive fund	Prize fund
Round of 16	8	$2,000
Quarter-finalists	4	$5,000
Semi-finalists	2	$10,000
Final runners-up	1	$25,000
Final winner	1	$50,000
Total		$131,000

In addition, a further $2,500 was donated from sponsor NAB to Member Federation clubs for each goal scored by them against an A-League opposition. Clubs to receive donations are Blacktown City ($12,500), Hakoah Sydney City East ($5,000), Heidelberg United ($2,500) and South Melbourne ($2,500).

== Preliminary rounds ==
FFA member federations teams competed in various state-based preliminary rounds to win one of 21 places in the competition proper (round of 32). All Australian clubs (other than youth teams associated with A-League franchises) were eligible to enter the qualifying process through their respective FFA member federation, however only one team per club was permitted entry in the competition. All nine FFA member federations took part in the tournament.

Federation	Competition	Round of 32 Qualifiers
Australian Capital Territory	Federation Cup	1
New South Wales	Waratah Cup	5
Northern New South Wales	—	2
Northern Territory	Sport Minister's Cup	1
Queensland	—	4
South Australia	Federation Cup	1
Tasmania	Milan Lakoseljac Cup	1
Victoria	Dockerty Cup	4
Western Australia	State Cup	2

The preliminary rounds will operate within a consistent national structure whereby club entry into the competition is staggered in each state/territory, ultimately leading to round 7 with the winning clubs from that round gaining direct entry into the round of 32. The first matches of the preliminary rounds began in February 2017, and the final matches of the preliminary rounds in June 2017.

== Teams ==
A total of 32 teams will participate in the 2017 FFA Cup competition proper, ten of which will come from the A-League, one being the 2016 National Premier Leagues Champion (Sydney United 58), and the remaining 21 teams from FFA member federations, as determined by the qualifying rounds. A-League clubs represent the highest level in the Australian league system, whereas member federation clubs come from Level 2 and below. The current season tier of member federation clubs is shown in parentheses.

A-League clubs
Adelaide United	Brisbane Roar	Central Coast Mariners	Melbourne City
Melbourne Victory	Newcastle Jets	Perth Glory	Sydney FC
Wellington Phoenix	Western Sydney Wanderers		
Member federation clubs
(Australian Capital Territory) Canberra Olympic (2)	(New South Wales) APIA Leichhardt Tigers (2)	(New South Wales) Bankstown Berries (3)	(New South Wales) Blacktown City (2)
(New South Wales) Hakoah Sydney City East (2)	(New South Wales) Hills Brumbies (3)	(New South Wales) Sydney United 58 (2)	(New South Wales) Broadmeadow Magic (2)
(New South Wales) Edgeworth FC (2)	(Northern Territory) Darwin Rovers (2)	Far North Queensland (2)	(Queensland) Gold Coast City (2)
(Queensland) Moreton Bay United (2)	(Queensland) Peninsula Power (3)	(South Australia) North Eastern MetroStars (2)	(Tasmania) Olympia (2)
(Victoria (state)) Bentleigh Greens (2)	(Victoria (state)) Heidelberg United (2)	(Victoria (state)) Hume City (2)	(Victoria (state)) South Melbourne (2)
(Western Australia) Sorrento FC (2)	(Western Australia) Western Knights (3)		

== Bracket ==
Round of 32
Moreton Bay United (a.e.t.)	4
Broadmeadow Magic	2
Gold Coast City	3
Western Knights	1
South Melbourne	1
Edgeworth FC	0
Sorrento FC	1
Canberra Olympic	0
Bankstown Berries	2
North Eastern MetroStars	1
Darwin Rovers	0
Sydney FC	8
Hills Brumbies	3
Hakoah Sydney City East (a.e.t.)	6
Peninsula Power	0
Melbourne City	2
Blacktown City	3
Central Coast Mariners	2
Olympia	0
APIA Leichhardt Tigers	5
Hume City	1 (1)
Bentleigh Greens (p)	1 (4)
Western Sydney Wanderers (a.e.t.)	1
Wellington Phoenix	0
Sydney United 58	7
Far North Queensland	2
Heidelberg United	1
Perth Glory	0
Adelaide United	1
Newcastle Jets	0
Brisbane Roar	1
Melbourne Victory	5

Round of 16
Moreton Bay United	0
Gold Coast City (a.e.t.)	1
South Melbourne	4
Sorrento FC	1
Bankstown Berries	0
Sydney FC	3
Hakoah Sydney City East	2
Melbourne City	3
Blacktown City	3
APIA Leichhardt Tigers	1
Bentleigh Greens	0
Western Sydney Wanderers	4
Sydney United 58	1 (3)
Heidelberg United (p)	1 (4)
Adelaide United	3
Melbourne Victory	0

Quarter-finals
Gold Coast City	0
South Melbourne	6
Sydney FC	2
Melbourne City	0
Blacktown City	2 (2)
Western Sydney Wanderers (p)	2 (4)
Heidelberg United	0
Adelaide United	3

Semi-finals
South Melbourne	1
Sydney FC	5
Western Sydney Wanderers	1
Adelaide United	2

Final
Sydney FC (a.e.t.)	2
Adelaide United	1

== Round of 32 ==
The Round of 32 draw took place on 29 June 2017, with match information confirmed on 3 July.

The lowest ranked sides that qualified for this round were Bankstown Berries, Hills Brumbies, Peninsula Power and Western Knights. They were the only level 3 teams left in the competition.

All times listed below are at AEST

26 July 2017	South Melbourne (2)	1–0	Edgeworth FC (2)	Lakeside Stadium, Melbourne
20:00	Lujic 90+4'	Report		Attendance: 2,622; Referee: Alex King

26 July 2017	Hills Brumbies (3)	3–6 (a.e.t.)	Hakoah Sydney City East (2)	Lily's Football Centre, Sydney
20:00	Giovenali 24'; Kelshaw 31'; Robertson 81'	Report	Frangie 29'; Jablonski 54', 89'; Sweet 99'; Lekoski 107'; Green 115'	Attendance: 879; Referee: Ben Abraham

26 July 2017	Bankstown Berries (3)	2–1	North Eastern MetroStars (2)	Jensen Park, Sydney
20:00	Bradshaw 19'; Moustakas 46'	Report	Dawber 90+4'	Attendance: 556; Referee: Lachlan Keevers

26 July 2017	Sorrento FC (2)	1–0	Canberra Olympic (2)	Percy Doyle Reserve, Perth
20:30	Canham 7'	Report		Attendance: 928; Referee: Adam Fielding

1 August 2017	Heidelberg United (2)	1–0	Perth Glory (1)	Olympic Village, Melbourne
19:30	Athiu 48'	Report		Attendance: 2,811; Referee: Adam Kersey

1 August 2017	Peninsula Power (3)	0–2	Melbourne City (1)	Dolphin Oval, Brisbane
19:30		Report	Mauk 45+1'; Fornaroli 90+1'	Attendance: 4,017; Referee: Lara Lee

1 August 2017	Olympia (2)	0–5	APIA Leichhardt Tigers (2)	KGV Park, Hobart
19:30		Report	Symons 7', 79', 86'; D'Apuzzo 27' (pen.); Sekiya 84'	Attendance: 1,252; Referee: Shaun Evans

1 August 2017	Western Sydney Wanderers (1)	1–0 (a.e.t.)	Wellington Phoenix (1)	Campbelltown Stadium, Sydney
19:30	Riera 120+2'	Report		Attendance: 3,189; Referee: Chris Kavanagh

2 August 2017	Blacktown City (2)	3–2	Central Coast Mariners (1)	Lily's Football Centre, Sydney
19:30	Gibbs 2', 82'; Speranza 17'	Report	Appiah 32', 54'	Attendance: 1,667; Referee: Adrian Arndt

2 August 2017	Moreton Bay United (2)	4–2 (a.e.t.)	Broadmeadow Magic (2)	Wolter Park, Brisbane
19:30	Janovsky 73' (pen.); Strogusz 75'; Mikula 107'; Smith 109'	Report	Fajkovic 18'; Bradbury 90+1' (pen.)	Attendance: 1,197; Referee: Chris Beath

2 August 2017	Gold Coast City (2)	3–1	Western Knights (3)	Mallawa Drive Sporting Complex, Gold Coast
19:30	Patterson 9' (o.g.); Kyle 64', 79'	Report	Burns 90+3'	Attendance: 1,033; Referee: Casey Reibelt

2 August 2017	Darwin Rovers (2)	0–8	Sydney FC (1)	Darwin Football Stadium, Darwin
19:30		Report	Bobô 24', 34' (pen.), 76', 84'; Carney 40'; Simon 52'; Buijs 58'; Ninković 72'	Attendance: 2,680; Referee: Daniel Elder

9 August 2017	Hume City (2)	1–1 (a.e.t.) (1–4 p)	Bentleigh Greens (2)	ABD Stadium, Melbourne
19:30	Prasad 62'	Report	Holmes 10'	Attendance: 659; Referee: Stephen Lucas
	Penalties
	Ofli (penalty missed); Prasad (penalty missed); Kaya (penalty scored)		(penalty scored) Litfin; (penalty scored) Thurtell; (penalty scored) Dover; (penalty scored) Honos

9 August 2017	Brisbane Roar (1)	1–5	Melbourne Victory (1)	Perry Park, Brisbane
19:30	Skapetis 90'	Report	Austin 26'; Troisi 35'; Berisha 48' (pen.), 73'; Milligan 51' (pen.)	Attendance: 3,184; Referee: Chris Beath

9 August 2017	Sydney United 58 (2)	7–2	Far North Queensland (2)	Sydney United Sports Centre, Sydney
19:30	Trifiro 25'; Sim 32'; Shin 46', 70'; Payne 47'; Nikas 58' (pen.); Vranic 82'	Report	Carroll 23'; Beverley 84' (pen.)	Attendance: 1,252; Referee: Katie Patterson

9 August 2017	Adelaide United (1)	1–0	Newcastle Jets (1)	Marden Sports Complex, Adelaide
19:30	Marrone 63'	Report		Attendance: 2,551; Referee: Kris Griffiths-Jones

== Round of 16 ==
The Round of 16 draw took place on 9 August 2017, immediately following matchday 4 of the round of 32, with match information confirmed on 11 August.

The lowest ranked side that qualified for this round was Bankstown Berries. They were the only level 3 team left in the competition.

All times listed below are at AEST

23 August 2017	Sydney United 58 (2)	1–1 (a.e.t.) (3–4 p)	Heidelberg United (2)	Sydney United Sports Centre, Sydney
19:30	Vranic 119'	Report	Ellis 111'	Attendance: 2,513; Referee: Kurt Ams
	Penalties
	Stavroulakis (penalty missed); Trifiro (penalty scored); Vranic (penalty scored); Payne (penalty scored); Fragogiannis (penalty missed)		(penalty scored) Athiu; (penalty scored) Ellis; (penalty scored) Byles; (penalty scored) Wilkins

23 August 2017	Adelaide United (1)	3–0	Melbourne Victory (1)	Marden Sports Complex, Adelaide
19:30	Absalonsen 53'; Blackwood 66' (pen.); Konstandopoulos 89'	Report		Attendance: 3,342; Referee: Jonathan Barreiro

23 August 2017	Moreton Bay United (2)	0–1 (a.e.t.)	Gold Coast City (2)	Wolter Park, Brisbane
19:30		Report	Smith 108' (pen.)	Attendance: 1,032; Referee: Lara Lee

23 August 2017	South Melbourne (2)	4–1	Sorrento FC (2)	Lakeside Stadium, Melbourne
19:30	Minopoulos 1'; Epifano 40', 90+3'; Lujic 70'	Report	Witschge 90+1'	Attendance: 939; Referee: Lachlan Keevers

29 August 2017	Bentleigh Greens (2)	0–4	Western Sydney Wanderers (1)	Kingston Heath Soccer Complex, Melbourne
19:30		Report	Cornthwaite 12'; Riera 53'; Lustica 78'; Bridge 90+3' (pen.)	Attendance: 1,634; Referee: Shaun Evans

29 August 2017	Blacktown City (2)	3–1	APIA Leichhardt Tigers (2)	Lily's Football Centre, Sydney
19:30	Gibbs 23', 68'; Mallia 52'	Report	Murray 13'	Attendance: 924; Referee: Kris Griffiths-Jones

29 August 2017	Bankstown Berries (3)	0–3	Sydney FC (1)	Sydney United Sports Centre, Sydney
19:30		Report	Brosque 5'; Bobô 61'; Mierzejewski 90+1' (pen.)	Attendance: 2,180; Referee: Ben Abraham

29 August 2017	Hakoah Sydney City East (2)	2–3	Melbourne City (1)	Leichhardt Oval, Sydney
19:30	De Jong 10'; Green 90+2'	Report	Jakobsen 8'; Fitzgerald 13'; Genreau 62'	Attendance: 2,915; Referee: Adrian Arndt

== Quarter-finals ==
The quarter-finals draw took place on 29 August 2017, immediately following the final matchday of the round of 16, with match information confirmed on 31 August.

The lowest ranked sides that qualified for this round were Blacktown City, Gold Coast City, Heidelberg United and South Melbourne. They were the only level 2 teams left in the competition.

All times listed below are at AEST

13 September 2017	Sydney FC (1)	2–0	Melbourne City (1)	Leichhardt Oval, Sydney
19:30	Buijs 7'; Brosque 51'	Report		Attendance: 4,102; Referee: Kris Griffiths-Jones

13 September 2017	Heidelberg United (2)	0–3	Adelaide United (1)	Olympic Village, Melbourne
19:30		Report	Mileusnic 3', 11', 61'	Attendance: 3,967; Referee: Daniel Elder

20 September 2017	Blacktown City (2)	2–2 (a.e.t.) (2–4 p)	Western Sydney Wanderers (1)	Lily's Football Centre, Sydney
19:30	Andrew 68', 104'	Report	Riera 3' (pen.), 111'	Attendance: 4,217; Referee: Katie Patterson
	Penalties
	Gibbs (penalty missed); Araujo (penalty missed); Lynch (penalty scored); G. Speranza (penalty scored)		(penalty scored) Bridge; (penalty scored) Scott; (penalty scored) Lustica; (penalty scored) Riera

20 September 2017	Gold Coast City (2)	0–6	South Melbourne (2)	Cbus Super Stadium, Gold Coast
19:30		Report	Lujic 2', 52'; Millar 8', 81'; Daley 37'; Zinni 70'	Attendance: 2,907; Referee: Jarred Gillett

== Semi-finals ==
The semi-finals draw took place on 20 September 2017, immediately following the final matchday of the quarter-finals, with match information confirmed on 25 September.

The lowest ranked side that qualified for this round was South Melbourne. They were the only level 2 team left in the competition.

All times listed below are at AEDT

11 October 2017	South Melbourne (2)	1–5	Sydney FC (1)	Lakeside Stadium, Melbourne
19:30	Minopoulos 47'	Report	Carney 4'; Bobô 17', 66'; Ryall 73'; Simon 83'	Attendance: 5,745; Referee: Chris Beath

24 October 2017	Western Sydney Wanderers (1)	1–2	Adelaide United (1)	Campbelltown Stadium, Sydney
19:30	Santalab 70' (pen.)	Report	Absalonsen 13'; Adlung 58'	Attendance: 5,126; Referee: Peter Green

== Final ==
All times listed below are at AEDT

21 November 2017
19:30 AEDT

Sydney FC	2–1 (a.e.t.)	Adelaide United
Ninković 19'; Bobô 111'	Report	Mileusnic 67'

Allianz Stadium, Sydney
Attendance: 13,452
Referee: Kris Griffiths-Jones

== Top goalscorers ==
Rank	Player	Club	Goals
1	(Brazil) Bobô	Sydney FC	8
2	(Australia) Joey Gibbs	Blacktown City	4
2	(Australia) Milos Lujic	South Melbourne	4
2	(Australia) Nikola Mileusnic	Adelaide United	4
2	(Spain) Oriol Riera	Western Sydney Wanderers	4
6	(Australia) Jarrod Kyle	Gold Coast City	3
6	(Australia) Sean Symons	APIA Leichhardt Tigers	3
8	15 Players	Various	2

Note: Goals scored in preliminary rounds not included.

== Broadcasting rights ==
The live television rights for the competition were held by the subscription network Fox Sports. In addition to live updates and crosses at concurrent matches, eleven matches were broadcast live.
