= Darwin Rovers FC =

- Full name: Darwin Rovers FC
- Founded: 2014
- Dissolved: 2018
- Ground: Darwin Football Stadium
- League: NT Division One
- Website: http://www.darwinrovers.com.au/

Darwin Rovers FC were a football (soccer) club based in Darwin, Northern Territory. They competed in the NorZone Premier League. The Rovers played their games at Darwin Football Stadium in the suburb of Marrara. In 2018 they merged with Palmerston FC to form Palmerston Rovers FC.

== History ==
The club was established by James 'Jimmy' Culligan and Shane Kavanagh, in 2014 as Shamrock Rovers Darwin FC; their inaugural season was in 2015 in the Northern Territory's All Age competition. In 2016 they were accepted to compete in the NorZone Premier League, the highest level of competition in the Territory.

In 2016, Rovers won the Northern Territory Sports Minister's Cup, qualifying them for the national stages of the 2016 FFA Cup. Rovers drew National Premier Leagues Queensland side Brisbane Strikers FC at home. Brisbane proved far too strong for Darwin, winning the clash 6–0 in front of over 1300 people at the Darwin Football Stadium.

The club was renamed Darwin Rovers FC in 2017.

On the 2 August 2017, Darwin Rovers played against Sydney FC in the Round of 32 of the 2017 FFA Cup and lost 8–0.

== See also ==
- Sport in the Northern Territory
