= 2025 Australia Cup =

2025 season of Australia's national knockout soccer competition

Tournament details
- Country: Australia; New Zealand
- Dates: 31 January – 4 October 2025
- Teams: 718 (qualifying competition); 32 (main competition)

Final positions
- Champions: Newcastle Jets (1st title)
- Runners-up: Heidelberg United

Tournament statistics
- Matches played: 31
- Goals scored: 105 (3.39 per match)
- Attendance: 70,842 (2,285 per match)
- Top goal scorer(s): Manyluak Aguek (6 goals)

The 2025 Australia Cup, known as the Hahn Australia Cup for sponsorship reasons, was the 12th season of the Australia Cup, the main national soccer knockout cup competition in Australia. This edition will be the fourth under the new name of the "Australia Cup" following the renaming of Football Federation Australia to Football Australia. Thirty-two teams contested the competition proper.

The qualifying competition began on 31 January, with the competition proper starting on 22 July 2025. The final was played at Lakeside Stadium, Melbourne, on 4 October 2025.

Macarthur FC were defending champions, but were eliminated by eventual champions Newcastle Jets in the quarter-finals.

Newcastle Jets defeated Heidelberg United in the final, with Heidelberg United becoming just the second National Premier Leagues (NPL) team and the first NPL Victoria team to reach the final.

As winners, the Newcastle Jets would have qualified for the group stage of the 2026–27 AFC Champions League Two. However, they qualified for the 2026–27 AFC Champions League Elite instead as 2025–26 A-League Men premiers, so their spot was transferred to Melbourne Victory (as the next highest Australian team in the A-League not already qualified for continental football).

This was the final edition of the competition to feature clubs from New Zealand, with Football Australia confirming that the 2026 edition onwards would solely feature clubs from Australia to align with the Asian Football Confederation's qualification requirements for the AFC Champions League Two.

== Round and dates ==
Round	Draw date	Match dates	Number of fixtures	Teams	New entries this round
Preliminary rounds	Various	31 January–18 June	686	718 → 32	709
Round of 32	25 June	22–30 July	16	32 → 16	9
Round of 16	30 July	10–13 August	8	16 → 8	None
Quarter-finals	30 July	19–24 August	4	8 → 4	None
Semi-finals	30 July	30–31 August	2	4 → 2	None
Final	—	4 October	1	2 → 1	None

== Preliminary rounds ==
Member federation teams are competing in various state-based preliminary rounds to win places in the competition proper (at the Round of 32). All Australian clubs (other than youth teams associated with A-League franchises) are eligible to enter the qualifying process through their respective member federation; however, only one team per club is permitted entry into the competition. The preliminary rounds operate within a consistent national structure whereby club entry into the competition is staggered in each state/territory, determined by what level the club sits at in the unofficial Australian soccer league system.

The top nine placed A-League Men clubs from the 2024–25 A-League Men season gain automatic qualification to the Round of 32. The other four teams entered a play-off series to determine the remaining two positions, with Perth Glory defeating the Central Coast Mariners and the Wellington Phoenix defeating Brisbane Roar to enter at the Round of 32 stage.

Federation	Associated competition	Round of 32 qualifiers
Football Australia	A-League Men	11
Capital Football (ACT)	Federation Cup (ACT)	1
Football NSW	Waratah Cup	4
Northern NSW Football	Northern NSW State Cup	2
Football Northern Territory	NT Australia Cup Final	1
Football Queensland	Kappa Queensland Cup	4
Football South Australia	Federation Cup (SA)	2
Football Tasmania	Milan Lakoseljac Cup	1
Football Victoria	Dockerty Cup	4
Football West (WA)	State Cup	2

== Teams ==
A total of 32 teams participated in the 2025 Australia Cup competition proper.

A-League Men clubs represent the highest level in the Australian league system, whereas Member Federation clubs come from level 2 and below.

A-League Men clubs
Adelaide United	Auckland FC	Macarthur FC	Melbourne City	Melbourne Victory
Newcastle Jets	Perth Glory	Sydney FC	Wellington Phoenix	Western Sydney Wanderers
Western United				
Member federation clubs
(Australian Capital Territory) Canberra Croatia (2)	(New South Wales) APIA Leichhardt (2)	(New South Wales) Northern Tigers (3)	(New South Wales) SD Raiders (3)	(New South Wales) Sydney United 58 (2)
(New South Wales) Cooks Hill United (2)	(New South Wales) Weston Bears (2)	(Northern Territory) Darwin Olympic (2)	(Queensland) Brisbane City (2)	(Queensland) Gold Coast Knights (2)
(Queensland) Olympic FC (2)	(Queensland) Peninsula Power (2)	(South Australia) Adelaide Croatia Raiders (2)	(South Australia) North Eastern MetroStars (2)	(Tasmania) South Hobart (2)
(Victoria (state)) Avondale FC (2)	(Victoria (state)) Heidelberg United (2)	(Victoria (state)) Nunawading City (4)	(Victoria (state)) South Melbourne (2)	(Western Australia) Olympic Kingsway (2)
(Western Australia) Stirling Macedonia (2)				

== Bracket ==
Round of 32
Heidelberg United	2
Weston Bears	0
Peninsula Power	0
Western Sydney Wanderers	3
Darwin Olympic	0
Nunawading City	9
Perth Glory	1 (7)
Wellington Phoenix (p)	1 (8)
Northern Tigers	0
Sydney United 58	1
Western United	0
Sydney FC	1
South Hobart	1
South Melbourne	2
Gold Coast Knights	0
Auckland FC	4
Avondale FC	5
Stirling Macedonia	1
APIA Leichhardt	2
Melbourne City	0
Brisbane City	2
Olympic FC	0
Olympic Kingsway (a.e.t.)	4
Melbourne Victory	3
Adelaide Croatia Raiders	2
Cooks Hill United	3
Newcastle Jets	2
Adelaide United	1
Canberra Croatia	0
North Eastern MetroStars	4
SD Raiders	0
Macarthur FC	5

Round of 16
Heidelberg United	3
Western Sydney Wanderers	0
Nunawading City	0
Wellington Phoenix	1
Sydney United 58	0
Sydney FC	2
South Melbourne	0
Auckland FC	3
Avondale FC	3
APIA Leichhardt	1
Brisbane City (p)	1 (4)
Olympic Kingsway	1 (3)
Cooks Hill United	0
Newcastle Jets	5
North Eastern MetroStars	0
Macarthur FC	2

Quarter-finals
Heidelberg United	4
Wellington Phoenix	0
Sydney FC	1 (1)
Auckland FC (p)	1 (3)
Avondale FC	6
Brisbane City	2
Newcastle Jets	3
Macarthur FC	0

Semi-finals
Heidelberg United	2
Auckland FC	0
Avondale FC	2
Newcastle Jets	4

Final
Heidelberg United	1
Newcastle Jets (a.e.t.)	3

== Round of 32 ==
The draw took place on 25 June. The lowest ranked side that qualified for this round was Nunawading City. They were the only level 4 team left in the competition.

Times are AEST (UTC+10) as listed by Football Australia (local times, if different, are in parentheses).

22 July 2025	Peninsula Power (2)	0–3	Western Sydney Wanderers (1)	Brisbane
19:30		Report	Kraev 8', 23'; Barbarouses 32'	Stadium: A.J. Kelly Park; Attendance: 1,839; Referee: Jack Powers

22 July 2025	Avondale FC (2)	5–1	Stirling Macedonia (2)	Melbourne
19:30	Trajceski 54'; Ahmed 61' (pen.); Aguek 79' (pen.), 90+1'; Kur 85'	Report	Brown-Montgomery 90+3'	Stadium: Green Gully Reserve; Attendance: 855; Referee: Jonathan Barreiro

22 July 2025	Darwin Olympic (2)	0–9	Nunawading City (4)	Darwin
19:30 (19:00 ACST)		Report	Edgar 3', 45', 52'; Kubenko 16' (pen.), 24'; Yongule 36'; Yoshimura 39'; Abboud 68'; Hodzic 87'	Stadium: Darwin Football Stadium; Attendance: 756; Referee: Declan Woods

23 July 2025	Northern Tigers (3)	0–1	Sydney United 58 (2)	Sydney
19:30		Report	Zuvela 45+1'	Stadium: Leichhardt Oval; Attendance: 1,161; Referee: Eric Saba

23 July 2025	Adelaide Croatia Raiders (2)	2–3	Cooks Hill United (2)	Adelaide
19:30 (19:00 ACST)	Hilton 5' (o.g.); Blazeka 85'	Report	Benson 33' (pen.), 61'; Williams 63'	Stadium: Croatian Sports Centre; Attendance: 650; Referee: Tom Brinkworth

23 July 2025	Heidelberg United (2)	2–0	Weston Bears (2)	Melbourne
19:30	Yokokawa 26'; Bisetto 87'	Report		Stadium: Olympic Village; Attendance: 525; Referee: Jock Quartermain

23 July 2025	South Hobart (2)	1–2	South Melbourne (2)	Hobart
19:30	Kemp 28'	Report	Brennan 32'; Bonada 41'	Stadium: KGV Park; Attendance: 2,077; Referee: Brenton Kopra

27 July 2025	Perth Glory (1)	1–1 (a.e.t.) (7–8 p)	Wellington Phoenix (1)	Perth
17:00 (15:00 AWST)	Taggart 89'	Report	L. Kelly-Heald 20'	Stadium: Kingsway Reserve; Attendance: 1,141; Referee: Liam Barclay
	Penalties
	Taggart (penalty scored); Bugarija (penalty scored); Gomulka (penalty scored); Ngo (penalty scored); O'Neill (penalty missed); Majekodunmi (penalty scored); Sutton (penalty scored); Lebib (penalty scored); Kaltak (penalty missed)		(penalty missed) Nagasawa; (penalty scored) Supyk; (penalty scored) Ishige; (penalty scored) Retre; (penalty scored) Candy; (penalty scored) Hughes; (penalty scored) Gillion; (penalty scored) Smith; (penalty scored) L. Kelly-Heald

29 July 2025	SD Raiders (3)	0–5	Macarthur FC (1)	Sydney
19:30		Report	Bernardo 32'; Letta 36' (o.g.); Sawyer 49'; Ikonomidis 64'; Caceres 82'	Stadium: Fairfield Showground; Attendance: 2,716; Referee: Jake Rose

29 July 2025	Gold Coast Knights (2)	0–4	Auckland FC (1)	Gold Coast
19:30		Report	Randall 1'; Rogerson 19'; May 36'; Gillion 70'	Stadium: Croatian Sports Centre; Attendance: 1,517; Referee: Lara Lee

29 July 2025	Western United (1)	0–1	Sydney FC (1)	Melbourne
19:30		Report	Macallister 75'	Stadium: Ironbark Fields; Attendance: 1,347; Referee: Jack Morgan

29 July 2025	Olympic Kingsway (2)	4–3 (a.e.t.)	Melbourne Victory (1)	Perth
21:00 (19:00 AWST)	Oxborrow 27' (pen.); Hobson 70'; Boland 90+3' (pen.), 101'	Report	Valadon 23'; Jelacic 45+1'; Piscopo 88'	Stadium: Kingsway Reserve; Attendance: 3,033; Referee: Sam Kelly

30 July 2025	Brisbane City (2)	2–0	Olympic FC (2)	Brisbane
19:30	Bolton 84'; Barnes 90+6'	Report		Stadium: Imperial Corp Stadium; Attendance: 2,271; Referee: Zac Keenan

30 July 2025	Newcastle Jets (1)	2–1	Adelaide United (1)	Maitland
19:30	Gibson 31'; Badolato 48'	Report	Mauk 15'	Stadium: Maitland Sportsground; Attendance: 2,167; Referee: Joshua Attard

30 July 2025	Canberra Croatia (2)	0–4	North Eastern MetroStars (2)	Canberra
19:30		Report	Fortunatow 30'; Gow 45'; Windsor 49'; Visser 59'	Stadium: Deakin Stadium; Attendance: 1,286; Referee: Georgia Ghirardello

30 July 2025	APIA Leichhardt (2)	2–0	Melbourne City (1)	Sydney
19:30	Kambayashi 27'; Stewart 79'	Report		Stadium: Leichhardt Oval; Attendance: 2,793; Referee: Nathan Shakespear

== Round of 16 ==
The draw for the remaining rounds took place on 30 July. The lowest ranked side that qualified for this round was Nunawading City. They were the only level 4 team left in the competition.

Times are AEST (UTC+10) as listed by Football Australia (local times, if different, are in parentheses).

10 August 2026	Sydney United 58 (2)	0–2	Sydney FC (1)	Sydney
15:00		Report	Toure 11'; Youlley 88'	Stadium: Sydney United Sports Centre; Attendance: 4,000; Referee: Thomas Dale

10 August 2026	Nunawading City (4)	0–1	Wellington Phoenix (1)	Melbourne
15:00		Report	Ishige 90+4'	Stadium: Nasiol Stadium; Attendance: 1,423; Referee: Eric Saba

11 August 2026	North Eastern MetroStars (2)	0–2	Macarthur FC (1)	Adelaide
20:00 (19:30 ACST)		Report	Bernardo 34'; Ikonomidis 47'	Stadium: T.K. Shutter Reserve; Attendance: 2,073; Referee: Daniel Cook

12 August 2026	Heidelberg United (2)	3–0	Western Sydney Wanderers (1)	Melbourne
19:30	Juach 13', 31'; Lesiotis 90+1'	Report		Stadium: Olympic Park; Attendance: 1,103; Referee: Zijad Ahmetovic

12 August 2026	Brisbane City (2)	1–1 (a.e.t.) (4–3 p)	Olympic Kingsway (2)	Brisbane
19:30	Docherty 64'	Report	Richard 58'	Stadium: Imperial Corp Stadium; Attendance: 1,569; Referee: Zac Keenan
	Penalties
	Crociati (penalty scored); Plusnin (penalty scored); Thom (penalty missed); Halliday (penalty scored); Love-Semira (penalty scored)		(penalty scored) Oxborrow; (penalty scored) Lowry; (penalty missed) Mathiang; (penalty scored) Boland; (penalty missed) Orr

13 August 2026	Cooks Hill United (2)	0–5	Newcastle Jets (1)	Newcastle
19:30		Report	Wilmering 20', 86'; Bertoncello 41'; Mizunuma 53'; Gibson 56'	Stadium: No.2 Sportsground; Attendance: 4,256; Referee: Matt Staples

13 August 2026	South Melbourne (2)	0–3	Auckland FC (1)	Melbourne
19:30		Report	Randall 17', 58'; Francois 69'	Stadium: Lakeside Stadium; Attendance: 3,712; Referee: Declan Woods

13 August 2026	Avondale FC (2)	3–1	APIA Leichhardt (2)	Melbourne
19:30	Zinni 9'; Tevere 45+1'; Aguek 76'	Report	Kambayashi 24'	Stadium: Green Gully Reserve; Attendance: 1,288; Referee: Jock Quartermain

== Quarter-finals ==
The lowest ranked sides that qualified for this round were Avondale FC, Brisbane City and Heidelberg United. They were the only level 2 teams left in the competition. All times are AEST (UTC+10).

19 August 2026	Heidelberg United (2)	4–0	Wellington Phoenix (1)	Melbourne
19:30	Hughes 35' (o.g.); Bisetto 47'; Yokokawa 51'; Dau 86'	Report		Stadium: Olympic Park; Attendance: 1,547; Referee: Lachlan Keevers

20 August 2026	Avondale FC (2)	6–2	Brisbane City (2)	Melbourne
19:30	Aguek 4', 16', 55'; Tevere 61' (pen.); Valentini 77'; Cuba 89'	Report	Crociati 68'; Yokoyama 81'	Stadium: Green Gully Reserve; Attendance: 2,535; Referee: Jock Quartermain

23 August 2026	Sydney FC (1)	1–1 (a.e.t.) (1–3 p)	Auckland FC (1)	Sydney
19:30	Lolley 87'	Report	Brook 85'	Stadium: Jubilee Stadium; Attendance: 3,237; Referee: Casey Reibelt
	Penalties
	Grant (penalty scored); King (penalty missed); Macallister (penalty missed); Lolley (penalty missed)		(penalty scored) Cosgrove; (penalty missed) May; (penalty scored) De Vries; (penalty scored) Brimmer

24 August 2026	Newcastle Jets (1)	3–0	Macarthur FC (1)	Maitland
16:00	Burgess 18'; Dobson 73'; Mizunuma 77'	Report		Stadium: Maitland Sportsground; Attendance: 2,579; Referee: Tim Danaskos

== Semi-finals ==
The lowest ranked sides that qualified for this round were Avondale FC and Heidelberg United. They were the only level 2 teams left in the competition. All times are AEST (UTC+10).

30 August 2026	Heidelberg United (2)	2–0	Auckland FC (1)	Melbourne
19:30	Juach 75'; Yokokawa 84'	Report		Stadium: Olympic Park; Attendance: 3,034

31 August 2026	Avondale FC (2)	2–4	Newcastle Jets (1)	Melbourne
15:00	Tevere 32', 57' (pen.)	Report	Bertoncello 6'; Mizunuma 16'; Adams 75'; Nunes 90+5'	Stadium: Avenger Park; Attendance: 2,352; Referee: Lachlan Keevers

== Final ==
4 October 2025
19:40 AEST

Heidelberg United (2)	1–3 (a.e.t.)	Newcastle Jets (1)
Lethlean 8'	Report	Burgess 22'; Fryer 96'; Gibson 115'

Lakeside Stadium, Melbourne
Attendance: 10,000
Referee: Adam Kersey

== Individual honours ==
The recipient of the Michael Cockerill Medal to recognise the tournament's standout National Premier Leagues performer was Fletcher Fulton from Heidelberg United.

Max Burgess from Newcastle Jets won the Mark Viduka Medal for the player of the match in the final.

== Top goalscorers ==
Rank	Player	Club	Goals
1	(South Sudan) Manyluak Aguek	Avondale FC	6
2	(Australia) Luca Tevere	Avondale FC	4
3	(Australia) Stuart Edgar	Nunawading City	3
3	(Australia) Ben Gibson	Newcastle Jets	3
3	(Australia) Bul Juach	Heidelberg United	3
3	(Japan) Kota Mizunuma	Newcastle Jets	3
3	(New Zealand) Jesse Randall	Auckland FC	3
3	(Japan) Asahi Yokokawa	Heidelberg United	3
9	(Australia) Joshua Benson	Cooks Hill United	2
9	(Australia) Bernardo	Macarthur FC	2
9	(Australia) Xavier Bertoncello	Newcastle Jets	2
9	(Australia) Max Bisetto	Heidelberg United	2
9	(Australia) Liam Boland	Olympic Kingsway	2
9	(Australia) Max Burgess	Newcastle Jets	2
9	(Australia) Chris Ikonomidis	Macarthur FC	2
9	(Japan) Seiya Kambayashi	APIA Leichhardt	2
9	(Bulgaria) Bozhidar Kraev	Western Sydney Wanderers	2
9	(Australia) Alex Kubenko	Nunawading City	2
9	(Australia) Daniel Wilmering	Newcastle Jets	2

Note: Goals scored in preliminary rounds not included.
