= 2018 FFA Cup =

2018 season of Australia's national knockout soccer competition

Tournament details
- Country: Australia; New Zealand
- Dates: 10 February – 30 October 2018
- Teams: 781

Final positions
- Champions: Adelaide United (2nd title)
- Runners-up: Sydney FC

Tournament statistics
- Matches played: 31
- Goals scored: 100 (3.23 per match)
- Attendance: 89,128 (2,875 per match)
- Top goal scorer: Craig Goodwin (5 goals)

The 2018 FFA Cup was the fifth season of the FFA Cup (now known as the Australia Cup), the main national soccer knockout cup competition in Australia. 32 teams contested the competition proper (from the round of 32), including the 10 A-League teams and 21 Football Federation Australia (FFA) member federation teams determined through individual state qualifying rounds, as well as the reigning National Premier Leagues Champion (Heidelberg United from Victoria).

== Round and dates ==
For the first time in the competition's history, the decision on the final venue will be conducted by a draw.

Round	Draw date	Match dates	Number of fixtures	Teams	New entries this round
Preliminary rounds	Various	10 February–23 June 2018	749 + 114 byes	781 → 32	770
Round of 32	26 June 2018	25 July–7 August 2018	16	32 → 16	11
Round of 16	7 August 2018	21–29 August 2018	8	16 → 8	none
Quarter-finals	29 August 2018	18–26 September 2018	4	8 → 4	none
Semi-finals	26 September 2018	5–6 October 2018	2	4 → 2	none
Final	6 October 2018	30 October 2018	1	2 → 1	none

== Teams ==
A total of 32 teams participated in the 2018 FFA Cup competition proper, ten of which were from the A-League, one the 2017 National Premier Leagues Champion (Heidelberg United), and the remaining 21 teams from FFA member federations, as determined by the qualifying rounds. A-League clubs represent the highest level in the Australian league system, whereas member federation clubs come from Level 2 and below. The current season tier of member federation clubs is shown in parentheses.

A-League clubs
Adelaide United	Brisbane Roar	Central Coast Mariners	Melbourne City
Melbourne Victory	Newcastle Jets	Perth Glory	Sydney FC
Wellington Phoenix	Western Sydney Wanderers		
Member federation clubs
(Australian Capital Territory) Canberra FC (2)	(New South Wales) APIA Leichhardt Tigers (2)	(New South Wales) Bonnyrigg White Eagles (2)	(New South Wales) Hakoah Sydney City East (2)
(New South Wales) Marconi Stallions (2)	(New South Wales) Rockdale City Suns (2)	(New South Wales) Broadmeadow Magic (2)	(New South Wales) Charlestown City Blues (2)
(Northern Territory) Hellenic Athletic (2)	(Queensland) Cairns FC (2)	(Queensland) Gold Coast Knights (4)	(Queensland) Olympic FC (2)
Queensland Lions (2)	(South Australia) Adelaide Comets (2)	(Tasmania) Devonport City (2)	(Victoria (state)) Avondale FC (2)
(Victoria (state)) Bentleigh Greens (2)	(Victoria (state)) Heidelberg United (2)	(Victoria (state)) Northcote City (2)	(Victoria (state)) Port Melbourne (2)
(Western Australia) Armadale SC (2)	(Western Australia) Gwelup Croatia (3)		

== Prize fund ==
The prize fund was unchanged from the previous two years' events.

Round	No. of Clubs receive fund	Prize fund
Round of 16	8	$2,000
Quarter-finalists	4	$5,000
Semi-finalists	2	$10,000
Final runners-up	1	$25,000
Final winner	1	$50,000
Total		$131,000

In addition, a further $2,500 was awarded from sponsor NAB to Member Federation clubs for each goal scored by them against an A-League opposition. Clubs to receive these prizes were APIA Leichhardt Tigers ($7,500), Hellenic Athletic ($7,500), Avondale FC ($5,000), Rockdale City ($5,000), Bentleigh Greens ($2,500), Bonnyrigg White Eagles ($2,500) and Cairns FC ($2,500).

== Preliminary rounds ==
FFA member federations teams competed in various state-based preliminary rounds to win one of 21 places in the competition proper (round of 32). All Australian clubs (other than youth teams associated with A-League franchises) were eligible to enter the qualifying process through their respective FFA member federation, however only one team per club was permitted entry in the competition. All nine FFA member federations took part in the tournament.

Federation	Competition	Round of 32 Qualifiers
ACT	Federation Cup	1
NSW	Waratah Cup	5
Northern NSW	—	2
NT	Sport Minister's Cup	1
Queensland	—	4
SA	Federation Cup	1
Tasmania	Milan Lakoseljac Cup	1
Victoria	Dockerty Cup	4
WA	State Cup	2

The preliminary rounds will operate within a consistent national structure whereby club entry into the competition is staggered in each state/territory, ultimately leading to round 7 with the winning clubs from that round gaining direct entry into the round of 32. The first matches of the preliminary rounds began in February 2018, and the final matches of the preliminary rounds in June 2018.

== Bracket ==
Round of 32; 25 July–7 August
Canberra FC	1
Broadmeadow Magic	4
Bentleigh Greens	1
Wellington Phoenix	0
Gwelup Croatia	0
Adelaide Comets	4
Heidelberg United	2
Charlestown City Blues	1
Port Melbourne	0
APIA Leichhardt Tigers	1
Perth Glory	0
Melbourne Victory	1
Queensland Lions	3
Olympic FC	2
Adelaide United	3
Central Coast Mariners	0
Brisbane Roar	0
Melbourne City (a.e.t.)	1
Gold Coast Knights	0
Newcastle Jets	1
Bonnyrigg White Eagles	2
Hakoah Sydney City East	1
Hellenic Athletic	3
Western Sydney Wanderers	4
Avondale FC	4
Marconi Stallions	1
Northcote City	1
Devonport City	3
Cairns FC	4
Armadale SC	0
Rockdale City Suns	2
Sydney FC	4

Round of 16; 21–29 August
Broadmeadow Magic	0
Bentleigh Greens	4
Adelaide Comets	0
Heidelberg United	4
APIA Leichhardt Tigers	3
Melbourne Victory	2
Queensland Lions	0
Adelaide United	1
Melbourne City	1
Newcastle Jets	0
Bonnyrigg White Eagles	1
Western Sydney Wanderers	2
Avondale FC	4
Devonport City	1
Cairns FC	1
Sydney FC	2

Quarter-finals; 18–26 September
Bentleigh Greens	1
Heidelberg United	0
APIA Leichhardt Tigers	0
Adelaide United	2
Melbourne City	1
Western Sydney Wanderers	2
Avondale FC	2
Sydney FC (a.e.t.)	4

Semi-finals; 5–6 October
Bentleigh Greens	0
Adelaide United	2
Western Sydney Wanderers	0
Sydney FC	3

Final; 30 October
Adelaide United	2
Sydney FC	1

== Round of 32 ==
The Round of 32 draw took place on 26 June 2018, with match information confirmed on 2 July.

The lowest ranked side that qualified for this round were Gold Coast Knights. They were the only level 4 team left in the competition.

All times listed below are at AEST

25 July 2018	Avondale FC (2)	4–1	Marconi Stallions (2)	ABD Stadium, Melbourne
19:30	Sheppard 2'; Katebian 54'; Boland 72' (pen.); Christodoulou 86'	Report	Andrew 5'	Attendance: 894; Referee: Stephen Lucas

25 July 2018	Port Melbourne (2)	0–1	APIA Leichhardt Tigers (2)	JL Murphy Reserve, Melbourne
19:30		Report	Sekiya 45+2'	Attendance: 604; Referee: David Webb

25 July 2018	Canberra FC (2)	1–4	Broadmeadow Magic (2)	Deakin Stadium, Canberra
19:30	James 12'	Report	Bradbury 22'; Majurovski 41', 47'; Fajkovic 78'	Attendance: 1,002; Referee: Kate Jacewicz

25 July 2018	Queensland Lions (2)	3–2	Olympic FC (2)	Lions Stadium, Brisbane
19:30	Simic 9'; Macuace 16'; Glockner 87'	Report	Nazary 62'; Lofthouse 81'	Attendance: 1,202; Referee: Chris Beath

25 July 2018	Gwelup Croatia (3)	0–4	Adelaide Comets (2)	Dorrien Gardens, Perth
20:30		Report	Briscoe 5'; Carter 44'; Andijanto 55'; Welsh 86' (pen.)	Attendance: 473; Referee: Adam Fielding

25 July 2018	Bonnyrigg White Eagles (2)	2–1	Hakoah Sydney City East (2)	Bonnyrigg Sports Ground, Sydney
20:30	Avery 19'; Kadric 80'	Report	Stamatellis 90' (pen.)	Attendance: 803; Referee: Chris Hope

1 August 2018	Rockdale City Suns (2)	2–4	Sydney FC (1)	Ilinden Sports Centre, Sydney
19:30	Gaitatzis 6'; Alameddine 76'	Report	De Silva 30'; Warland 48'; Brosque 51', 64'	Attendance: 4,489; Referee: Ben Abraham

1 August 2018	Adelaide United (1)	3–0	Central Coast Mariners (1)	Marden Sports Complex, Adelaide
19:30	Elsey 12'; Boland 19'; Goodwin 53'	Report		Attendance: 3,107; Referee: Shaun Evans

1 August 2018	Heidelberg United (2)	2–1	Charlestown City Blues (2)	Olympic Village, Melbourne
19:30	Davison 1' (o.g.); Ellis 13'	Report	Ott 82'	Attendance: 773; Referee: Jonathan Barreiro

1 August 2018	Cairns FC (2)	4–0	Armadale SC (2)	Barlow Park, Cairns
19:30	Carroll 53'; Taylor 68'; Koppen 79'; O'Hare 90+1'	Report		Attendance: 971; Referee: Jarred Gillett

7 August 2018	Bentleigh Greens (2)	1–0	Wellington Phoenix (1)	Kingston Heath Soccer Complex, Melbourne
19:30	Jankovic 23'	Report		Attendance: 1,283; Referee: Adam Kersey

7 August 2018	Gold Coast Knights (4)	0–1	Newcastle Jets (1)	Cbus Super Stadium, Gold Coast
19:30		Report	Topor-Stanley 11'	Attendance: 2,222; Referee: Lara Lee

7 August 2018	Brisbane Roar (1)	0–1 (a.e.t.)	Melbourne City (1)	Dolphin Oval, Brisbane
19:30		Report	Fornaroli 120'	Attendance: 6,151; Referee: Casey Reibelt

7 August 2018	Northcote City (2)	1–3	Devonport City (2)	David Barro Stadium, Melbourne
19:30	Khalif 85'	Report	Barnard 12', 15'; Stone 78'	Attendance: 851; Referee: Katie Patterson

7 August 2018	Hellenic Athletic (2)	3–4	Western Sydney Wanderers (1)	Darwin Football Stadium, Darwin
20:30	Smith 39'; Maskey 55', 73'	Report	Billias 8' (o.g.); Riera 10' (pen.), 69'; Bonevacia 90+2'	Attendance: 3,000; Referee: Kurt Ams

7 August 2018	Perth Glory (1)	0–1	Melbourne Victory (1)	Dorrien Gardens, Perth
20:30		Report	Barbarouses 38'	Attendance: 1,754; Referee: Shaun Evans

== Round of 16 ==
The Round of 16 draw took place on 7 August 2018, with match details finalised two days later.

The lowest ranked sides that qualified for this round were Adelaide Comets, APIA Leichhardt Tigers, Avondale FC, Bentleigh Greens, Bonnyrigg White Eagles, Broadmeadow Magic, Cairns FC, Devonport City, Heidelberg United and Queensland Lions. They were the only level 2 teams left in the competition.

All times listed below are at AEST

21 August 2018	Avondale FC (2)	4–1	Devonport City (2)	ABD Stadium, Melbourne
19:30	Sheppard 20'; Archibald 36'; Kamsoba 82'; Germano 90' (pen.)	Report	Mann 42' (pen.)	Attendance: 725; Referee: Jarred Gillett

21 August 2018	Broadmeadow Magic (2)	0–4	Bentleigh Greens (2)	Magic Park, Newcastle
19:30		Report	Lucas 47', 52', 71' (pen.); Holmes 86'	Attendance: 1,748; Referee: Kurt Ams

21 August 2018	APIA Leichhardt Tigers (2)	3–2	Melbourne Victory (1)	Leichhardt Oval, Sydney
19:30	Sekiya 9', 47'; Millgate 80'	Report	Athiu 60', 66'	Attendance: 2,467; Referee: Ben Abraham

21 August 2018	Cairns FC (2)	1–2	Sydney FC (1)	Barlow Park, Cairns
19:30	Cavanah 17'	Report	Brosque 64' (pen.); Buhagiar 67'	Attendance: 3,950; Referee: Chris Beath

29 August 2018	Melbourne City (1)	1–0	Newcastle Jets (1)	AAMI Park, Melbourne
19:30	Fornaroli 54'	Report		Attendance: 3,673; Referee: Jonathan Barreiro

29 August 2018	Adelaide Comets (2)	0–4	Heidelberg United (2)	Adelaide Shores Football Centre, Adelaide
19:30		Report	Way 7'; Schiavo 34'; Ellis 71'; Cahill 85' (pen.)	Attendance: 1,482; Referee: Daniel Elder

29 August 2018	Queensland Lions (2)	0–1	Adelaide United (1)	Perry Park, Brisbane
19:30		Report	Goodwin 31'	Attendance: 1,774; Referee: Peter Green

29 August 2018	Bonnyrigg White Eagles (2)	1–2	Western Sydney Wanderers (1)	Marconi Stadium, Sydney
19:30	Diaz 65'	Report	Baumjohann 12'; Hamill 74'	Attendance: 5,137; Referee: Stephen Lucas

== Quarter-finals ==
The quarter-finals draw took place on 29 August 2018, with match details announced the following day.

The lowest ranked sides that qualified for this round were APIA Leichhardt Tigers, Avondale FC, Bentleigh Greens and Heidelberg United. They were the only level 2 teams left in the competition.

All times listed below are at AEST

19 September 2018	Avondale FC (2)	2–4 (a.e.t.)	Sydney FC (1)	ABD Stadium, Melbourne
19:30	Boland 56', 61'	Report	Buhagiar 17', 28'; Ninković 105'; Le Fondre 114'	Attendance: 1,566; Referee: Jonathan Barreiro

19 September 2018	Melbourne City (1)	1–2	Western Sydney Wanderers (1)	AAMI Park, Melbourne
19:30	McGree 53'	Report	Riera 33'; Bonevacia 41'	Attendance: 1,800; Referee: Daniel Elder

26 September 2018	APIA Leichhardt Tigers (2)	0–2	Adelaide United (1)	Leichhardt Oval, Sydney
19:30		Report	Goodwin 71'; Boland 80'	Attendance: 1,823; Referee: Kurt Ams

26 September 2018	Bentleigh Greens (2)	1–0	Heidelberg United (2)	Kingston Heath Complex, Melbourne
19:30	Alexander 87'	Report		Attendance: 2,104; Referee: Shaun Evans

== Semi-finals ==
The semi-finals draw took place on 26 September 2018, with match details announced the next day.

The lowest ranked side that qualified for this round were Bentleigh Greens. They were the only level 2 team left in the competition.

All times listed below are at AEDT

5 October 2018	Bentleigh Greens (2)	0–2	Adelaide United (1)	Kingston Heath Complex, Melbourne
19:30 AEDT		Report	Halloran 21'; Elsey 49'	Attendance: 2,416; Referee: Chris Beath

6 October 2018	Western Sydney Wanderers (1)	0–3	Sydney FC (1)	Panthers Stadium, Sydney
19:30 AEDT		Report	Buhagiar 49'; de Jong 64'; Le Fondre 75' (pen.)	Attendance: 14,436; Referee: Daniel Elder

== Final ==
30 October 2018
19:30 AEDT

Adelaide United (1)	2–1	Sydney FC (1)
Goodwin 25', 74'	Report	Le Fondre 28' (pen.)

Coopers Stadium, Adelaide
Attendance: 14,448
Referee: Jarred Gillett

== Individual honours ==
The Michael Cockerill Medal was introduced in 2018 to recognise the tournament's standout National Premier Leagues performer, named after the late former journalist and broadcaster Michael Cockerill who died in August 2017. The inaugural recipient of the award was Elvis Kamsoba from Avondale FC. Craig Goodwin from Adelaide United won the Mark Viduka Medal for the player of the match in the final.

== Top goalscorers ==
Rank	Player	Club	Goals
1	(Australia) Craig Goodwin	Adelaide United	5
2	(Australia) Trent Buhagiar	Sydney FC	4
3	(Australia) Liam Boland	Avondale FC	3
3	(Australia) Alex Brosque	Sydney FC	3
3	(England) Adam Le Fondre	Sydney FC	3
3	(Australia) Chris Lucas	Bentleigh Greens	3
3	(Spain) Oriol Riera	Western Sydney Wanderers	3
3	(Japan) Tasuku Sekiya	APIA Leichhardt Tigers	3
9	(South Sudan) Kenny Athiu	Melbourne Victory	2
9	(Australia) Miles Barnard	Devonport City	2
9	(Germany) Mirko Boland	Adelaide United	2
9	(Curaçao) Roly Bonevacia	Western Sydney Wanderers	2
9	(Scotland) Sean Ellis	Heidelberg United	2
9	(Australia) Jordan Elsey	Adelaide United	2
9	(Uruguay) Bruno Fornaroli	Melbourne City	2
9	(Australia) John Majurovski	Broadmeadow Magic	2
9	(Nepal) Sulav Maskey	Hellenic Athletic	2
9	(England) Kaine Sheppard	Avondale FC	2

Notes:

- Goals scored in preliminary rounds not included.

== Broadcasting rights ==
The live television rights for the competition were held by the subscription network Fox Sports. The matches were also broadcast online on the My Football Live app from the round of 16 onwards. In addition to live updates and crosses at concurrent matches, ten matches were broadcast live.
