= Palmonstown Lafaek =

- Full name: Futebol Clube Palmonstown Lafaek
- Nickname: El Lafaek (en: Crocodile)
- Founded: 1999; 27 years ago
- League: Super Liga

Palmonstown Lafaek is a football club of East Timor.

== Affiliated Clubs ==
- (Australia) Palmerston FC
- (Republic of Ireland) Palmerstown United F.C
