= 2015 FFA Cup =

2015 season of Australia's national knockout soccer competition

Tournament details
- Country: Australia; New Zealand
- Dates: 14 February – 7 November 2015
- Teams: 648

Final positions
- Champions: Melbourne Victory (1st title)
- Runners-up: Perth Glory

Tournament statistics
- Matches played: 31
- Goals scored: 105 (3.39 per match)
- Attendance: 113,803 (3,671 per match)
- Top goal scorer: Aaron Mooy (6 goals)

The 2015 FFA Cup was the second season of the FFA Cup (now known as the Australia Cup), the main national soccer knockout cup competition in Australia. 32 teams began competition in the competition proper (from the round of 32), including all 10 A-League teams, the reigning National Premier Leagues Champion (North Eastern MetroStars from South Australia), and 21 Football Federation Australia (FFA) member federation teams determined through individual state-based preliminary rounds. 2015 marks the first season in which teams from all nine FFA member federations participated, with the Northern Territory participating for the first time.

The winner of the FFA Cup, Melbourne Victory, received $50,000 as part of a total prize money pool of $131,000. The defending champions, Adelaide United, were knocked out in the quarter-final stage of the competition.

== Round and dates ==
Round	Draw date	Match date	Number of fixtures	Teams	New entries this round
Preliminary rounds	Various	14 February–28 June 2015	619 + 104 byes	648 → 32	637
Round of 32	1 July 2015	29 July–11 August 2015	16	32 → 16	11
Round of 16	12 August 2015	26 August–1 September 2015	8	16 → 8	none
Quarter-finals	1 September 2015	22–30 September 2015	4	8 → 4	none
Semi-finals	29 September 2015	20–28 October 2015	2	4 → 2	none
Final	27 October 2015	7 November 2015	1	2 → 1	none

== Prize fund ==
Round	No. of Clubs receive fund	Prize fund
Round of 16	8	$2,000
Quarter-finalists	4	$5,000
Semi-finalists	2	$10,000
Final runners-up	1	$25,000
Final winner	1	$50,000
Total		$131,000

In addition, a further $2,500 was donated from sponsor NAB to Member Federation clubs for each goal scored by them against an A-League opposition. Three clubs received donations – Rockdale City Suns ($5,000), Darwin Olympic ($2,500) and Edgeworth FC ($2,500).

== Preliminary rounds ==
FFA member federations teams competed in various state-based preliminary rounds to win one of 21 places in the competition proper (round of 32). All Australian clubs (other than youth teams associated with A-League franchises) were eligible to enter the qualifying process through their respective FFA member federation; however, only one team per club was permitted entry in the competition. All nine FFA member federations took part in the tournament, with the Northern Territory participating for the first time.

Player registration numbers in each jurisdiction were used to determine the number of qualifying teams for each member federation:

- NSW had five teams qualify.
- Queensland have four teams qualify.
- Victoria have four teams qualify.
- Northern NSW have two teams qualify.
- Western Australia have two teams qualify.
- ACT have one team qualify.
- Northern Territory have one team qualify.
- South Australia have one team qualify.
- Tasmania have one team qualify.

Unlike the previous season, this competition's preliminary rounds operated within a consistent national structure whereby club entry into the competition were staggered in each state or territory, ultimately leading to a seventh and final round, with the winning clubs from that round gaining direct entry into the round of 32. The first matches of the preliminary rounds began on 14 February, and the final matches of the preliminary rounds took place on 28 June.

== Teams ==
A total of 32 teams participated in the 2015 FFA Cup competition proper, ten of which came from the A-League, one being the 2014 National Premier Leagues Champion (North Eastern MetroStars from South Australia), and the remaining 21 teams from FFA member federations, as determined by the preliminary rounds. A-League clubs represent the highest level in the Australian league system, whereas member federation clubs come from Level 2 and below.

A-League clubs
Adelaide United	Brisbane Roar	Central Coast Mariners	Melbourne City
Melbourne Victory	Newcastle Jets	Perth Glory	Sydney FC
Wellington Phoenix	Western Sydney Wanderers		
Member federation clubs
(Australian Capital Territory) Gungahlin United (2)	(New South Wales) Blacktown City (2)	(New South Wales) Rockdale City Suns (2)	(New South Wales) Sydney Olympic (2)
(New South Wales) Sydney United 58 (2)	(New South Wales) Balmain Tigers (4)	(New South Wales) Broadmeadow Magic (2)	(New South Wales) Edgeworth FC (2)
(Northern Territory) Darwin Olympic (2)	(Queensland) Brisbane Strikers (2)	Far North Queensland (2)	(Queensland) Palm Beach (2)
Queensland Lions (3)	(South Australia) Croydon Kings (2)	(South Australia) North Eastern MetroStars (2)	(Tasmania) South Hobart (2)
(Victoria (state)) Heidelberg United (2)	(Victoria (state)) Hume City (2)	(Victoria (state)) Oakleigh Cannons (2)	(Victoria (state)) South Melbourne (2)
(Western Australia) Perth SC (2)	(Western Australia) Sorrento FC (2)		

== Draw ==
As with the previous season, teams were allocated into one of three pots for the FFA Cup Round of 32 draw. Pot A included the four A-League teams to reach the semi-finals of the 2014–15 A-League finals series (Melbourne Victory, Sydney FC, Adelaide United and Melbourne City), Pot B included the remaining six A-League teams, and Pot C contained the 2014 National Premier Leagues Champion and the 21 member federation teams which qualified via the preliminary rounds. Teams were drawn randomly into pre-determined positions. For the round of 16, Quarter-finals and Semi-finals, teams were allocated into two pots: The remaining A-League teams into one pot, and the remaining member federation teams into the other. In each draw, teams were drawn randomly into pre-determined positions.

== Bracket ==
Round of 32
Hume City (a.e.t.)	4
Brisbane Strikers	3
Gungahlin United	0
Sydney Olympic	1
Blacktown City	1
North Eastern MetroStars	2
Oakleigh Cannons (p)	1 (5)
Far North Queensland	1 (4)
Rockdale City Suns	3
Perth SC	1
Balmain Tigers	0
Melbourne Victory	6
Darwin Olympic	1
Adelaide United	6
Sorrento FC	0
Sydney FC	2
Croydon Kings	1
Queensland Lions	2
Newcastle Jets	2 (3)
Perth Glory (p)	2 (4)
Palm Beach (p)	1 (8)
South Melbourne	1 (7)
Western Sydney Wanderers	1
Brisbane Roar	0
Broadmeadow Magic	1
Heidelberg United	3
Sydney United 58 (p)	3 (3)
South Hobart	3 (1)
Edgeworth FC	1
Melbourne City	2
Central Coast Mariners	0
Wellington Phoenix	1

Round of 16
Hume City	3
Sydney Olympic	1
North Eastern MetroStars	0
Oakleigh Cannons	1
Rockdale City Suns	2
Melbourne Victory	3
Adelaide United (a.e.t.)	2
Sydney FC	1
Queensland Lions	0
Perth Glory (a.e.t.)	1
Palm Beach	0
Western Sydney Wanderers	2
Heidelberg United	2
Sydney United 58	0
Melbourne City	5
Wellington Phoenix	1

Quarter-finals
Hume City (a.e.t.)	3
Oakleigh Cannons	2
Melbourne Victory	3
Adelaide United	1
Perth Glory (p)	1 (4)
Western Sydney Wanderers	1 (2)
Heidelberg United	0
Melbourne City	5

Semi-finals
Hume City	0
Melbourne Victory	3
Perth Glory	3
Melbourne City	1

Final
Melbourne Victory	2
Perth Glory	0

== Round of 32 ==
The lowest ranked side that qualified for this round were the Balmain Tigers. They were the only level 4 team left in the competition.

All times listed below are at AEST

29 July 2015	Palm Beach (2)	1–1 (a.e.t.) (8–7 p)	South Melbourne (2)	Cbus Super Stadium, Gold Coast
19:30	Matk 38' (pen.)	Report	Lujic 34'	Attendance: 1,638; Referee: Nathan MacDonald
	Penalties
	Reus (penalty scored); Vazquez (penalty scored); Boxell (penalty missed); Riis (penalty scored); Hofmann (penalty scored); Mirkovic (penalty scored); Jones (penalty scored); Rees (penalty scored); Endean (penalty scored)		(penalty missed) Hatzikostas; (penalty scored) Norton; (penalty scored) Minopoulos; (penalty scored) Epifano; (penalty scored) Barker-Daish; (penalty scored) Lujic; (penalty scored) Kecojevic; (penalty scored) Bevin; (penalty missed) Eagar

29 July 2015	Broadmeadow Magic (2)	1–3	Heidelberg United (2)	Magic Park, Newcastle
19:30	Petitt 74'	Report	Petrie 24'; Sheppard 26'; Heffernan 40'	Attendance: 1,342; Referee: Chris Young

29 July 2015	Blacktown City (2)	1–2	North Eastern MetroStars (2)	Lily Homes Stadium, Sydney
19:30	Antelmi 35'	Report	Negus 60'; Callisto 78'	Attendance: 875; Referee: David Bruce

29 July 2015	Hume City (2)	4–3 (a.e.t.)	Brisbane Strikers (2)	ABD Stadium, Melbourne
19:30	Hegarty 5'; Schroen 90+2', 105+1'; Henslee 120+1' (o.g.)	Report	Henslee 26'; Coulson 90', 103'	Attendance: 853; Referee: Jonathan Barreiro

4 August 2015	Balmain Tigers (4)	0–6	Melbourne Victory (1)	Leichhardt Oval, Sydney
19:30		Report	Berisha 11'; Pain 41'; Barbarouses 56'; Georgievski 58'; Howard 70'; Ben Khalfallah 84'	Attendance: 4,849; Referee: Steve Lucas

4 August 2015	Gungahlin United (2)	0–1	Sydney Olympic (2)	Gungahlin Enclosed Oval, Canberra
19:30		Report	M. Gaitatzis 82'	Attendance: 1,603; Referee: Rebecca Durcau

4 August 2015	Sydney United 58 (2)	3–3 (a.e.t.) (3–1 p)	South Hobart (2)	Sydney United Sports Centre, Sydney
19:30	Nikas 58', 71'; Triantis 81'	Report	Hunt 27'; Mann 47'; Hess 87'	Attendance: 350; Referee: Luke Withell
	Penalties
	Tomelic (penalty scored); Nikas (penalty scored); Paric (penalty missed); Triantis (penalty scored)		(penalty missed) Mann; (penalty missed) Lewis; (penalty scored) Schmidt; (penalty missed) Kemp

4 August 2015	Edgeworth FC (2)	1–2	Melbourne City (1)	Magic Park, Newcastle
19:30	Hammel 26'	Report	Mooy 35', 90+4'	Attendance: 2,430; Referee: Kris Griffiths-Jones

5 August 2015	Sorrento FC (2)	0–2	Sydney FC (1)	nib Stadium, Perth
20:30		Report	Smeltz 3' (pen.); Burgess 75'	Attendance: 3,485; Referee: Adam Fielding

5 August 2015	Darwin Olympic (2)	1–6	Adelaide United (1)	Darwin Football Stadium, Darwin
20:30	Tsounias 19'	Report	Carrusca 18'; Jeggo 38', 39'; Cirio 78'; Babalj 80'; Sánchez 81'	Attendance: 3,175; Referee: Lucien Laverdure

5 August 2015	Rockdale City Suns (2)	3–1	Perth SC (2)	Rockdale Ilinden Sports Centre, Sydney
20:30	Alameddine 21'; Macallister 43'; Ješić 58'	Report	Keltie 71'	Attendance: 1,857; Referee: Katie Patterson

5 August 2015	Croydon Kings (2)	1–2	Queensland Lions (3)	Elite Systems Football Centre, Adelaide
20:30	Klimek 66'	Report	Kahn 14'; Bonotto 47'	Attendance: 980; Referee: Daniel Elder

11 August 2015	Western Sydney Wanderers (1)	1–0	Brisbane Roar (1)	Pepper Stadium, Sydney
19:30	Mebrahtu 69'	Report		Attendance: 6,028; Referee: Kris Griffiths-Jones

11 August 2015	Newcastle Jets (1)	2–2 (a.e.t.) (3–4 p)	Perth Glory (1)	Magic Park, Newcastle
19:30	Carney 24'; Haliti 115'	Report	Sidnei 87'; Marinković 92'	Attendance: 2,563; Referee: Shaun Evans
	Penalties
	Haliti (penalty missed); Poljak (penalty scored); Lee (penalty scored); Carney (penalty missed); Hoffman (penalty scored); Alivodić (penalty missed)		(penalty scored) Marinković; (penalty scored) Valentini; (penalty missed) Harold; (penalty scored) Golec; (penalty missed) Djulbic; (penalty scored) Sándor

11 August 2015	Central Coast Mariners (1)	0–1	Wellington Phoenix (1)	Central Coast Stadium, Gosford
19:30		Report	Appiah 17'	Attendance: 6,111; Referee: Steve Lucas

11 August 2015	Oakleigh Cannons (2)	1–1 (a.e.t.) (5–4 p)	Far North Queensland (2)	Jack Edwards Reserve, Melbourne
19:30	Piemonte 93'	Report	Gosling 119'	Attendance: 711; Referee: Patrick Chaplin
	Penalties
	Bosnjak (penalty scored); Pavlović (penalty scored); Rooney (penalty scored); Piemonte (penalty scored); Honos (penalty scored)		(penalty scored) O'Hare; (penalty missed) Maffey-Stumpe; (penalty scored) Gosling; (penalty scored) Price; (penalty scored) Carroll

== Round of 16 ==
The lowest ranked side that qualified for this round were the Queensland Lions. They were the only level 3 team left in the competition.

All times listed below are at AEST

26 August 2015	Adelaide United (1)	2–1 (a.e.t.)	Sydney FC (1)	Coopers Stadium, Adelaide
19:30	Sánchez 41'; McGowan 114'	Report	Grant 16'	Attendance: 5,066; Referee: Shaun Evans

26 August 2015	Melbourne City (1)	5–1	Wellington Phoenix (1)	AAMI Park, Melbourne
19:30	Mooy 18' (pen.); Novillo 21'; Fornaroli 32' (pen.); Koren 40'; Dekker 49'	Report	Krishna 34' (pen.)	Attendance: 4,027; Referee: Lucien Laverdure

26 August 2015	Heidelberg United (2)	2–0	Sydney United 58 (2)	Olympic Village, Melbourne
19:30	Heffernan 1'; Athiu 87'	Report		Attendance: 2,270; Referee: Patrick Chaplin

26 August 2015	Queensland Lions (3)	0–1 (a.e.t.)	Perth Glory (1)	Perry Park, Brisbane
19:30		Report	Harold 116'	Attendance: 2,550; Referee: Peter Green

1 September 2015	Hume City (2)	3–1	Sydney Olympic (2)	ABD Stadium, Melbourne
19:30	Clark 35'; Schroen 42'; Markelis 83'	Report	Hatzimouratis 64'	Attendance: 1,625; Referee: Jonathan Barreiro

1 September 2015	North Eastern MetroStars (2)	0–1	Oakleigh Cannons (2)	Elite Systems Football Centre, Adelaide
19:30		Report	Pavlović 67'	Attendance: 1,218; Referee: Rick Schneider

1 September 2015	Rockdale City Suns (2)	2–3	Melbourne Victory (1)	Jubilee Oval, Sydney
19:30	Ješić 53' (pen.); Broxham 86' (o.g.)	Report	Makarounas 45', 65'; Berisha 50'	Attendance: 4,165; Referee: Katie Patterson

1 September 2015	Palm Beach (2)	0–2	Western Sydney Wanderers (1)	Cbus Super Stadium, Gold Coast
19:30		Report	Dimas 29'; Hamill 86'	Attendance: 1,794; Referee: Alan Milliner

== Quarter-finals ==
The lowest ranked sides that qualified for this round were Heidelberg United, Hume City and Oakleigh Cannons. They were the only level 2 teams left in the competition.

All times listed below are at AEST

22 September 2015	Melbourne Victory (1)	3–1	Adelaide United (1)	AAMI Park, Melbourne
19:30	Finkler 10'; Barbarouses 45+1'; Berisha 82' (pen.)	Report	Carrusca 78' (pen.)	Attendance: 10,521; Referee: Peter Green

22 September 2015	Hume City (2)	3–2 (a.e.t.)	Oakleigh Cannons (2)	ABD Stadium, Melbourne
19:30	Markelis 17', 84'; Schroen 118'	Report	Rooney 3'; Piemonte 34'	Attendance: 1,504; Referee: Adam Fielding

29 September 2015	Heidelberg United (2)	0–5	Melbourne City (1)	Olympic Village, Melbourne
20:00		Report	Fornaroli 2', 90+2'; Mooy 65', 69', 84'	Attendance: 11,372; Referee: Strebre Delovski

29 September 2015	Perth Glory (1)	1–1 (a.e.t.) (4–2 p)	Western Sydney Wanderers (1)	Dorrien Gardens, Perth
20:30	Marinković 59'	Report	Dimas 41'	Attendance: 3,003; Referee: Stephen Lucas
	Penalties
	Marinković (penalty scored); Golec (penalty scored); Sidnei (penalty scored); Garcia (penalty scored)		(penalty scored) Vidošić; (penalty missed) Piovaccari; (penalty scored) Andreu; (penalty missed) Jamieson

== Semi-finals ==
The lowest ranked side that qualified for this round was Hume City, who were the only level 2 team left in the competition.

All times listed below are at AEDT

21 October 2015	Perth Glory (1)	3–1	Melbourne City (1)	nib Stadium, Perth
21:30	Sándor 24'; Garuccio 45+3' (o.g.); Harold 72'	Report	Millar 43'	Attendance: 4,165; Referee: Shaun Evans

28 October 2015	Hume City (2)	0–3	Melbourne Victory (1)	AAMI Park, Melbourne
19:30		Report	Berisha 41' (pen.); Barbarouses 89'; Geria 90+5'	Attendance: 6,575; Referee: Ben Williams

== Final ==
7 November 2015
19:30 AEDT

Melbourne Victory (1)	2–0	Perth Glory (1)
Bozanic 35'; Berisha 42'	Report

AAMI Park, Melbourne
Attendance: 15,098
Referee: Ben Williams

== Top goalscorers ==
Rank	Player	Club	Goals
1	(Australia) Aaron Mooy	Melbourne City	6
2	(Albania) Besart Berisha	Melbourne Victory	5
3	(Australia) Marcus Schroen	Hume City	4
4	(New Zealand) Kosta Barbarouses	Melbourne Victory	3
4	(Uruguay) Bruno Fornaroli	Melbourne City	3
4	(Australia) Theo Markelis	Hume City	3
7	(Argentina) Marcelo Carrusca	Adelaide United	2
7	(Spain) Dimas	Western Sydney Wanderers	2
7	(Australia) Chris Harold	Perth Glory	2
7	(England) Daniel Heffernan	Heidelberg United	2
7	(Australia) Marko Ješić	Rockdale City Suns	2
7	(Serbia) Nebojša Marinković	Perth Glory	2
7	(Australia) Panny Nikas	Sydney United 58	2
7	(Australia) Dean Piemonte	Oakleigh Cannons	2
7	(Spain) Pablo Sánchez	Adelaide United	2

Note: Goals scored in preliminary rounds not included.

== FFA Cup All-Star Team ==
Goalkeeper	Defenders	Midfielders	Forwards
(Australia) Ante Covic, Perth Glory	(Australia) Leigh Broxham, Melbourne Victory (France) Matthieu Delpierre, Melbourne Victory (Australia) Dino Djulbic, Perth Glory (Australia) Matthew Foschini, Oakleigh Cannons	(Serbia) Nebojša Marinković, Perth Glory (Australia) Aaron Mooy, Melbourne City (Hungary) György Sándor, Perth Glory	(Albania) Besart Berisha, Melbourne Victory (Australia) Marcus Schroen, Hume City (Australia) Theo Markelis, Hume City

== Broadcasting rights ==
The live television rights for the competition were held by the subscription network Fox Sports, who broadcast 11 games live, with live updates and crosses from a single camera at the concurrent matches for goals and highlights. Games not broadcast on Fox Sports were streamed live via their online services.
