= Mindil Aces FC =

Association football club in Darwin, Northern Territory, Australia

- Full name: Mindil Aces Football Club
- Nickname: Aces
- Founded: 1980
- Ground: Darwin Football Stadium, Bagot Park
- Capacity: 3000
- Chairman: David McWilliam
- Manager: Daniel McCormick
- League: NorZone Premier League
- 2023: 2nd of 7
- Website: http://www.mindilfc.com/

Mindil Aces Football Club is an Australian semi-professional soccer club based in Darwin, which competes in the NorZone Premier League.

== History ==
The Aces advanced to the Round of 32 of the 2022 Australia Cup for the first time by defeating Casuarina FC 2–0 in the Sports Minister's Cup final. The draw for the Round of 32 was conducted on 28 June 2022 where Mindil was drawn against NPL Victoria club Avondale FC.

== Current squad (2022) ==
As of 5 September 2022

Note: Flags indicate national team as defined under FIFA eligibility rules; some limited exceptions apply. Players may hold more than one non-FIFA nationality.

No.	Pos.	Nation	Player
1	GK	AUS	Jordan Stobbart
23	GK	AUS	Sebastian Da Silva
2	DF	AUS	James Carr
11	DF	AUS	Than Oo
4	DF	AUS	Mauricio Morales
13	DF	AUS	Nick Kontzionis
15	DF	AUS	Josh Evans
5	DF	AUS	Jeff Williams
3	DF	AUS	Matthew Mifsud
18	MF	AUS	Barney Wood

No.	Pos.	Nation	Player
74	MF	AUS	Cayne McDowell
8	MF	AUS	Taiki Kudo
18	MF	AUS	Dylan Mountain
6	MF	AUS	Josh Lagudah
10	MF	AUS	Matthew Wallace
9	FW	AUS	Tayvian Ludvigsen
12	FW	AUS	Lewis William
7	FW	AUS	Uche Okwara
21	FW	AUS	Tom Allibert
14	FW	AUS	Eamon Kelly

== See also ==
- Sport in the Northern Territory
