= Palmerston Rovers FC =

Association football club in Palmerston, Northern Territory, Australia

- Full name: Palmerston Rovers FC
- Founded: 2018
- League: NorZone Premier League
- Website: http://www.footballnt.com.au/pages/Palmerston-Rovers-FC.html

Palmerston Rovers Football Club are a soccer club based in Palmerston, Northern Territory, Australia. They were formed in 2018 after the merger between Palmerston FC and Darwin Rovers.

== See also ==
- Sport in the Northern Territory
