= Port Darwin FC =

Association football club in Darwin, Northern Territory, Australia

- Full name: Port Darwin Football Club
- Nicknames: Port, Wharfies
- Founded: 1996
- Ground: Fannie Bay, Northern Territory
- Chairman: James Bowden
- Manager: Ryan Bailey
- League: NorZone Premier League
- 2023: 6th of 7
- Website: http://portdarwinfc.com/
| Home colours | Away colours |

Port Darwin Football Club is an Australian soccer club based in Darwin, which competes in the NorZone Premier League.

== History ==
Port Darwin FC was formed in 1996 following a merger of two prominent junior Darwin football clubs. Parap and St Mary's came together and with the senior Waratahs Club joining the fledgling club in 2006, the claret and blue's were formed.

Six years later Port Darwin FC secured its first Premiership, defeating Darwin Olympic 5–1 in the 2012 Grand Final. The club's home ground is Gardens Oval, centrally located in the heart of Darwin.

The club has grown throughout its short history, fielding a Norzone Premier League and a Reserves side along with an All Ages Men side, A Senior Women's team and numerous Under Age Teams from Miniroos right up to Under 18's.

In 2018 Port Darwin Football Club's committee decided to give PDFC a fresh new look and change the club's logo which would move the club into the 21st century. The committee wanted to have a modern, fresh logo that resonated with Darwin history and decided to depict something from the Bombing of Darwin, so the boat on the new logo is that of HMAS Mavie a 19-ton patrol boat operated by the Royal Australian Navy which was sunk by the Japanese in the Bombing of Darwin, the club's founding year ‘1996’ is also depicted on the new logo, which overall heavily draws inspiration from the logo of Manchester City F.C.

== Honours ==
Premier League

- Mens Premier League Champions 2012
- Mens Premier League Reserve Champions 2018

Junior Teams

- Under 18s Premier League Champions 2023
- Under 18s Premier League Champions 2024
- Under 18s Premier League Champions 2025

== Kit ==
In the early years, various designs and colours were used by Port Darwin. The 2008–09 home kit was claret with sky blue arms and a sky blue stripe under the right arm, while the away kit was mostly sky blue with a claret trim. From the 2008–09 season Port Darwin FC has kept the same kit.

== Championship Year (2012) ==

The 2012 Men's Premier League Champions line-up that defeated Darwin Olympic 5–1.

== See also ==
- Sport in the Northern Territory
