= Hellenic Athletic =

Association football club in Darwin, Northern Territory, Australia

- Full name: Hellenic Athletic Club
- Nickname: The Blues
- Founded: 1958
- Ground: Darwin Football Stadium
- Capacity: 5000
- Chairman: Kosta Boubaris
- Manager: Dimi Galanopoulos
- League: NorZone Premier League
- 2023: 1st of 7 (premiers & champions)
- Website: https://www.hellenicac.com.au/

Hellenic Athletic Club, also commonly known as Hellenic Athletic, is an Australian soccer club from Darwin, the Northern Territory. Hellenic Athletic currently competes in the NorZone Premier League.

Hellenic were formed in 1958 and consider Darwin Olympic as their main rivals – the rivalry dates back 32 years, considered one of the territory's strongest sporting rivalries.

Hellenic advanced to the Round of 32 of the 2018 FFA Cup for the first time by defeating Verdi FC 9–0 in the Sports Minister's Cup final. The draw for the Round of 32 was conducted on 26 June 2018 where Hellenic was drawn against A-League club Western Sydney Wanderers. They faced each other at Darwin Football Stadium on 7 August 2018 where Hellenic lost 3–4. Sulav Maskey was the eventual winner of the inaugural FFA Cup Goal of the Year by getting on the end of a through ball and chipping the Wanderer's keeper with his first touch.

== See also ==
- List of Greek soccer clubs in Australia
