= Palmerston FC =

Palmerston
- Full name: Palmerston Football Club
- Founded: 1999
- Dissolved: 2018
- Chairman: Bill Miller
- Manager: Terry Daye
- League: NT Division One
- Website: http://www.palmerstonfc.com.au

Palmerston Football Club was an Australian football club based in Palmerston, the Northern Territory. Palmerston competed in the NorZone Premier League. After the 2008 season the club was relegated, but was reinstated in the Territory's top league on the provision of relocating its training base closer to the Palmerston city centre.

== History ==
The club was formed as Palmerston La Faek in 1999, however prior to the club's incorporation in 1991, Palmerston's first soccer team in 1984 was the Palmerston and Rural Districts Junior Soccer Club. La-Faek came from the East Timorese word meaning crocodile, which was part of the club's emblem. Also on the emblem was a satellite dish, representing Palmerston as a satellite city to Darwin. The clubhouse is a customary building of Timor. In 2008 the club changed its name to Palmerston Football Club.

== See also ==
- Sport in the Northern Territory
