= Azzurri United FC =

Association football club in Darwin, Northern Territory, Australia

Azzuri United
- Full name: Azzurri United Football Club
- Nickname: Azzuri
- Short name: AUFC
- Founded: 1999
- Ground: Azzurri stadium
- Capacity: 1,000
- Manager: Dimi Galanopoulos
- League: NorZone Premier League
- Website: http://www.universityazzurrifc.com/
Home colours	Away colours

Azzurri United Football Club is an Australian football club based in Darwin, the Northern Territory. Founded in 1999 as University Rangers, the club merged with Nakara Azzurri in 2010 to form University Azzurri. The club currently competes in the NorZone Premier League, with matches played at University Oval. The club maintains affiliation with Charles Darwin University.

== History ==
The origins of University Rangers is traced to 1999, where the club was formed as an associated sporting club of the Northern Territory University Sports Association (now Charles Darwin University Sports Association). In 2010, the club merged with Nakara Azzurri, founded in 2006 after the merger of Nakara SC and Darwin Azzurri SC. Both clubs had previously established themselves in the local leagues of Darwin.

=== Nakara Azzurri ===

The club competed in the NorZone Premier League, with matches played form Nakara Oval, until it dissolved at the end of the 2009 season. The club's origins are traced to the founding of Darwin Azzurri on 28 November 1994. The club competed in the local Darwin football leagues.

== Honours ==
- 1999 DSL
- 2004 TASL League
- 2015 Singa Cup

== See also ==
- Sport in the Northern Territory
- List of Italian soccer clubs in Australia
