= Katie Patterson =

Australian soccer referee

Katie Patterson is an Australian businesswoman and soccer referee. In September 2015, she became the first female to referee an A-League game in a competitive match, when she officiated the 2015 FFA Cup tie between Rockdale City Suns and Melbourne Victory at Jubilee Oval.
