= Casuarina FC =

Association football club in Darwin, Northern Territory, Australia

Casuarina Football Club
- Full name: Casuarina Football Club
- Nickname: Rowdies
- Founded: 1977
- Ground: Portuguese and Timorese Club stadium
- Capacity: 6000
- Chairman: Scott Piper
- Manager: Formerly Lee Addison
- League: NorZone Premier League
- 2023: 4th of 7
- Website: http://www.casuarinafc.org
Home colours	Away colours	Third colours

Casuarina Football Club is an Australian soccer club based in Casuarina, the Northern Territory. Casuarina was established in 1977, currently competes in the NorZone Premier League.

== See also ==
- Sport in the Northern Territory
