= Sport in the Northern Territory =

Australian sport

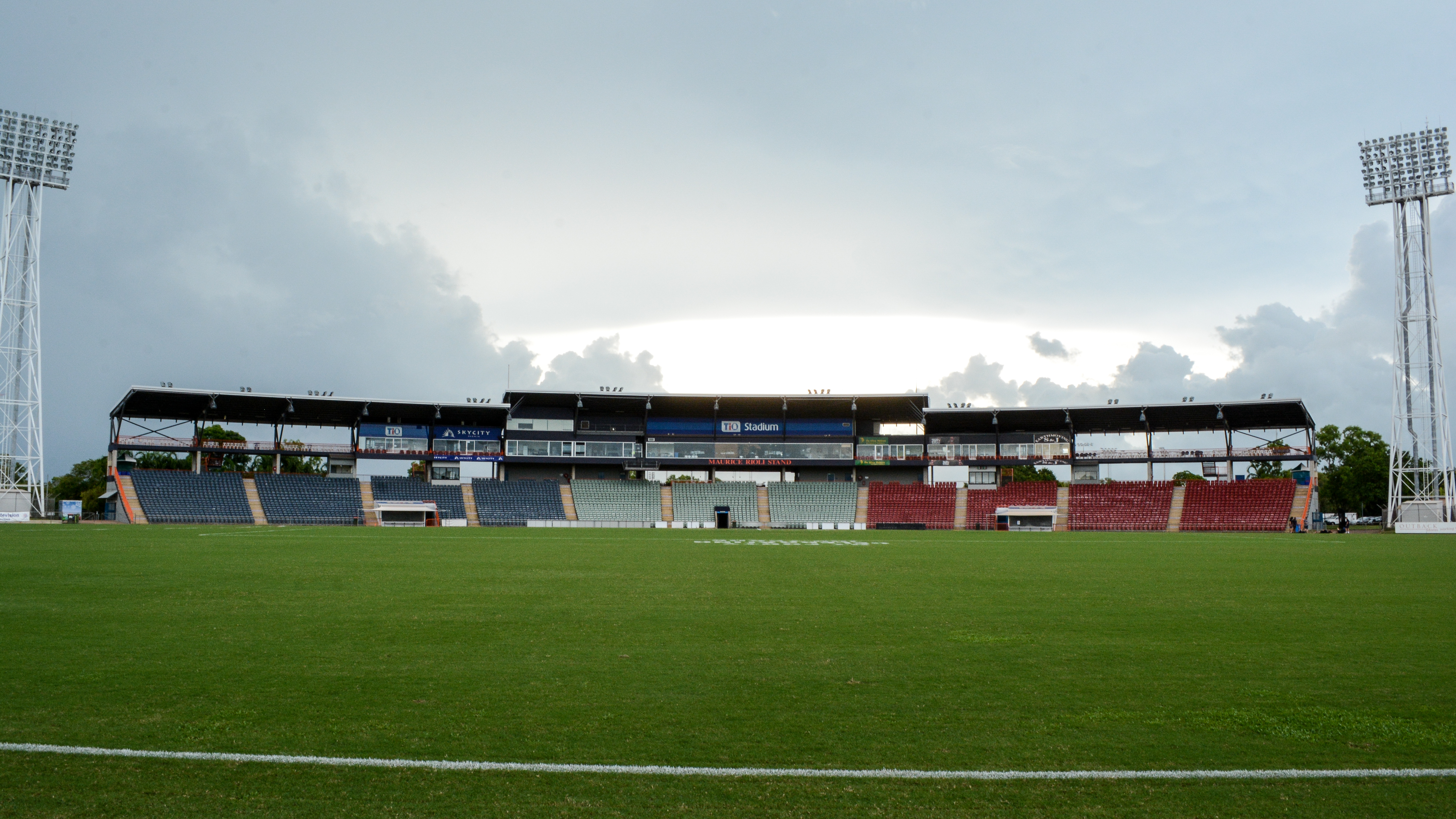
Marrara Oval, the largest sports stadium in the Northern Territory

Many sports are played in the Northern Territory of Australia.

== Animals in sport ==
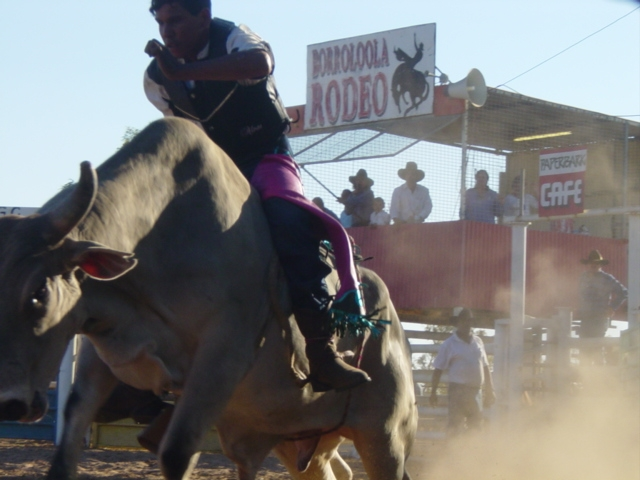
Borroloola Bushmans Carnival Rodeo

The Borroloola Bushmans Rodeo and Campdraft Carnival, Katherine Show & Rodeo and Noonamah Tavern Rodeo

== Australian rules football ==
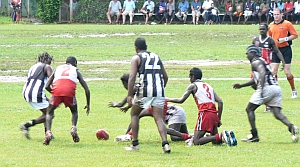
Tiwi Islands Football League Grand Final 05/06 at Nguiu stadium. Mulluwurri vs Pumurali

Australian rules football is the Territory's most popular sport, particularly with Indigenous Australian communities in Darwin, Alice Springs and the Tiwi Islands. The governing body for football in the territory is the AFL Northern Territory.

18% of all Territorians in 2017 participated in Australian Football, the highest participation rate in Australia (and second worldwide). The sport also produces more professional Australian Footballers per capita in the Australian Football League than any other state or territory.

The Northern Territory is home to several representative teams, most notably the Aboriginal All-Stars. Also the Flying Boomerangs represent Australia internationally and the Northern Territory has a strong local competition, the Northern Territory Football League. A professional club, the Northern Territory Football Club (NT Thunder) was formed in 2008 and competed in the second tier semi-national NEAFL competition. Following a 2018 scoping study, in 2021 the Northern Territory AFL taskforce launched an official bid to enter a team into the national Australian Football League (AFL) competition which is under consideration by the league for entry around 2030.

Since the debut of Reuben Cooper in 1969 a large number of Territorians have played in the AFL, though a significant percentage have launched their professional football careers from other states, particularly South Australia. A proportionately high number of AFL players per capita are now from the Territory. Perhaps the most accomplished born and raised player is Australian Football Hall of Famer Andrew Mcleod. Fellow Hall of Famer Nathan Buckley is the only Territorian to win the prestigious Brownlow Medal. Darwin-born Shaun Burgoyne holds both the AFL games and goals records with 407 games and 302 goals. Burgoyne and Cyril Rioli have played in 4 AFL premierships, more than any other Territorian.

== Baseball ==
Baseball NT is the governing body of baseball within the Northern Territory. Baseball NT is governed by the Australian Baseball Federation.

Organised baseball is played in Darwin, Alice Springs and Katherine. Darwin has four clubs; Nightcliff Tigers, Palmerston Reds, Pints and Tracy Village Rebels. The East Darwin Beasts disbanded in 1986 and the South Darwin Rabbitohs disbanded in 2004.

For a brief history of baseball in Darwin, see Darwin baseball league and Northern Territory Buffalos. In Darwin, baseball is a dry-season sport, played between April and September each year.

Alice Springs has five teams; Bulls, Cubs, Demons, Panther and Redbacks

== Basketball ==
Basketball Northern Territory (BNT) is the governing body of basketball in the Northern Territory. The major association in the territory is Darwin Basketball Association (DBA). In 2022, the Darwin Salties debuted in the Queensland-based NBL1 North competition, making the NBL1 the first Australian sport league to have clubs based in and playing out of every state and territory in Australia. The club folded in 2024 due to financial difficulties.

== Combat sports ==
Boxing NT is the governing body for amateur boxing in the Northern Territory and is affiliated with Boxing Australia.

There are four clubs for affiliated with Judo NT they are Darwin Judo Club, Marrara Judo Club, The Judo Studio and Top End Judo Academy.

Only two clubs for affiliated with Australian Karate Federation they are Okinawan Chinese Martial Arts Association and Darwin Shotokan Karate.

Australian Armwrestling Federation holds Northern Territory Championships

== Cricket ==
Cricket is administered by Northern Territory Cricket.

== Cycling ==
Cycling is administered by Cycling Northern Territory.

The Darwin Cycling Club was established in 1955.

== Field hockey ==
Field hockey is administered by Northern Territory Hockey Association and was formed in Darwin in 1948

Hockey was first played in the Northern Territory in Darwin in 1940

NT Stingers and NT Pearls compete in the Australian Hockey League.

== Fishing ==
Million Dollar Fish was first held in 2015 and is the richest competition in Australia.

== Golf ==
Golf is administered by Golf Northern Territory. With the Northern Territory PGA Championship.Clubs with full 18-hole designs are Alice Springs Golf Course, Alyangula Golf Club, Darwin Golf Club, Elliott Golf Club, Gardens Park Golf Links, Gove Country Golf Club, Humpty Doo and Rural Area Golf Club, Jabiru Golf Club, Katherine Golf Club, Palmerston Golf & Country Club, RAAF Darwin Golf Club, RAAF Tindal Golf Club and Tennant Creek Golf Club.

== Ice sports ==
Winter sports are played at Darwin Ice Skating Centre.

== Motorsport ==
Darwin hosts a round of the Supercars Championship every year, the Darwin Triple Crown, bringing thousands of motorsports fans to the Hidden Valley Raceway. The Hidden Valley Raceway facility also contains a drag strip as part of Hidden Valley Raceway's main straight, and a nearby Speedway, Northline Speedway, for short circuit dirt surface racing.

In the south of the Territory, Australia's biggest Off-Road Race, the Finke Desert Race is held over a long circuit which takes in the settlement of Aputula on the Finke River. The event is based out of Alice Springs Inland Dragway.

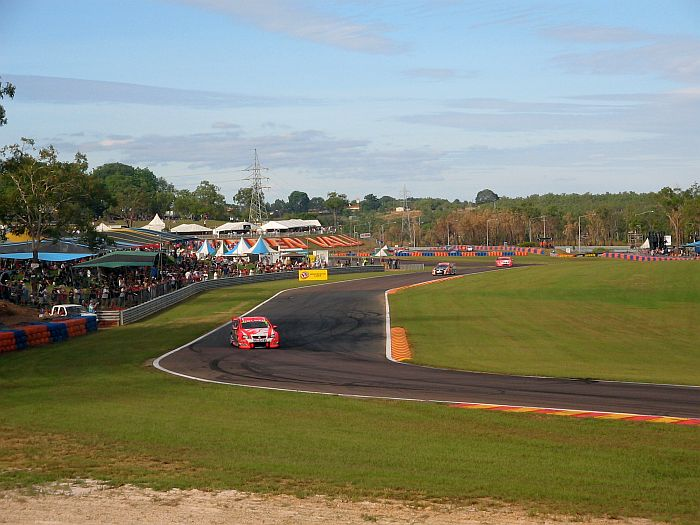
Hidden Valley Raceway

Australia's only twin circuit mud racing track is at Top End Mud Racing.

Red CentreNATS is an automotive lifestyle festival with Burnout competitions and drag racing event's.

The Outback Air Race starts in Darwin and finishes in Coffs Harbour.

Ross Macpherson Smith and Keith Macpherson Smith won the 1919 England to Australia flight air race.

== Motorcycle speedway ==
Tennant Creek Speedway 19°37′28″S 134°11′56″E just north of Tennant Creek on the Kaczinsky Road hosted important motorcycle speedway events, including qualifying rounds of the Speedway World Championship (starting in 1985).

Arunga Park Speedway 23°40′13″S 133°52′33″E on the eastern edge of Braitling off the Herbert Heritage Dr hosted important motorcycle speedway events, including qualifying rounds of the Speedway World Championship (starting in 1986).

Northline Speedway 12°26′45″S 130°54′33″E on the Hidden Valley road hosted the Northern Territory qualifying round of the Speedway World Championship in 1990.

== Netball ==
Netball is administered by Netball Northern Territory.

Territory Storm represents Netball Northern Territory in the Australian Netball League.

The Territory Netball Stadium is the official netball stadium of the Northern Territory.

== Rugby league ==
Rugby league is administered by the Northern Territory Rugby League. The territory has the highest participation rate per capita for Rugby League than any other state governing body in Australia. The National Rugby League has conducted numerous clinics and hosted regular pre-season matches in the territory since 1998. Local domestic competitions are based in Darwin, Alice Springs, Katherine and Gove. A combined Northern Territory team also participates in the Affiliated States Championship.

== Rugby union ==
Rugby union is administered by the Northern Territory Rugby Union. Local senior club competitions are based in Darwin, Alice Springs and Katherine. Clubs in Darwin have women's teams and junior competitions, and Nhulunbuy on the Gove Peninsula has a junior rugby competition.

The Darwin Hottest Sevens tournament is hosted in Darwin each January, with Rugby sevens club teams from countries including Australia, New Zealand, Papua New Guinea, Malaysia, and Singapore competing. Darwin's Hottest 7s, with a prize pool of $65,000 in 2013, is the richest Rugby sevens tournament in the Southern Hemisphere.

== Racing ==
The Darwin Cup Carnival culminating on the first Monday of August is a very popular horse race event for Darwin Turf Club and draws large crowds every year to Fannie Bay Racecourse. The first Darwin Cup winner at Fannie Bay was Satan's Son in 1956.

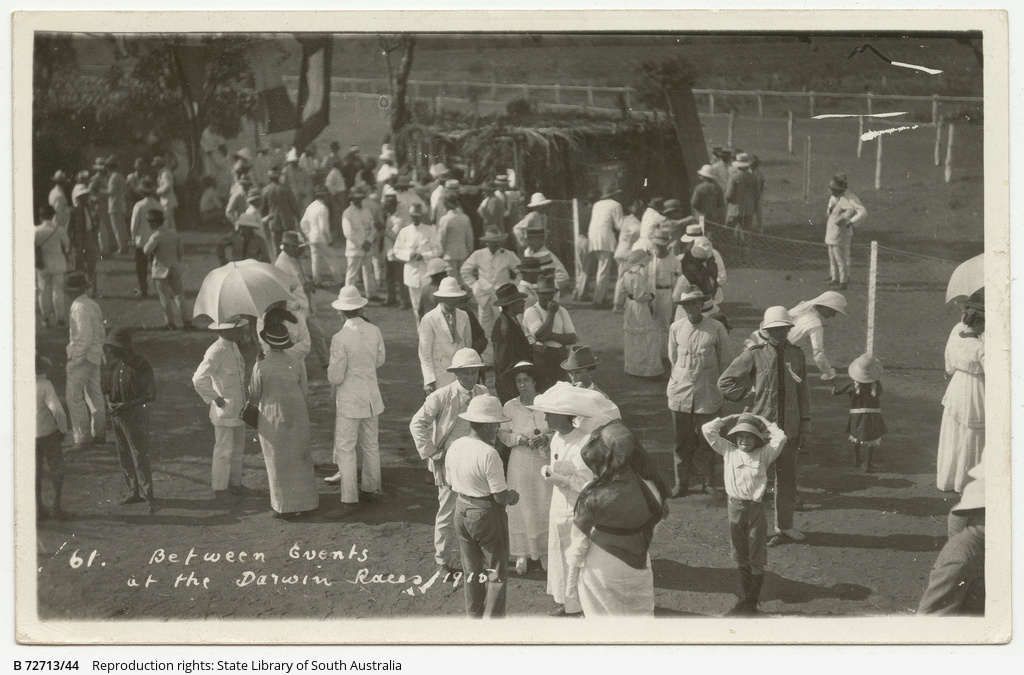
Between events at the Darwin races 1915

Alice Springs Turf Club has the Pioneer Park Racecourse in Connellan, Northern Territory.

The Camel Cup is an annual camel racing festival held in Alice Springs.

There is one greyhound racing track in Darwin at Winnellie Park on Hook Road. It is the only track in the Northern Territory.

== Sailing ==
Darwin Sailing Club has hosting regattas and sailing events, from NT Championships and frequent Australian Championship regattas to World Sailing Grade 3 Match Racing regattas and World Championship regattas.

Gove Boat Club established in 1971 and is one of the oldest.

== Shooting sports ==
Sporting Shooters Association of Australia has shooting ranges and facilities in Micket Creek (at Berrimah), Alice Springs (at Ilparpa) and Tennant Creek.

== Soccer ==
Football Northern Territory is the governing body for football (soccer) in the Northern Territory. The Territory is also separated into three (Northern, Central and Southern) zones which have their own zone councils which administer leagues locally running their own league and cup competitions.

The Darwin Football Stadium was officially opened on 28 July 2007 when it played host to an A-League Pre-Season Cup game between Perth Glory and Melbourne Victory. On 2 July 2009, A-League teams, Adelaide United FC and North Queensland Fury played a pre-season friendly at the stadium.

Reigning Football Federation Association Champions Adelaide United defeated Darwin Olympic 6–1 in a cup match at Marrara Oval in August 2015. Michael Tsounias scored the lone goal for the home side.

Alice Springs's most successful soccer club is Alice Springs Celtic FC.

The Refugee World Cup was held in Darwin.

== Swimming ==
Swimming is administered by Swimming Northern Territory.

Darwin hosted the 1992 Australian Short Course Swimming Championships at Casuarina Pool.

== Tennis ==
Tennis is administered by Tennis Northern Territory.

== Events ==
The Northern Territory also hosts state and international sporting events. These have included:

- The Barefoot Crab-Tying World Championships
- The annual Camel Cup in Alice Springs.
- Since 1991 Darwin has hosted the Arafura Games every two years until its cancellation in 2012.
- The Australian Wallabies rugby union side trained in the Northern Territory in September 2002 in preparation for the World Cup in 2003. Wallabies coach Eddie Jones credited the Territory training camp as playing a crucial role in their upset semi-final victory over the New Zealand All Blacks. The Wallabies camped at Mount Borradile in Arnhem Land and encountered a 4-metre saltwater crocodile. Jones stated; "the Darwin camp for us was very positive, as the guys physically and mentally benefited from training in the heat, and it was a very important experience for us".
- In July 2003, Darwin hosted its first international test cricket match between Australia and Bangladesh and then Australia and Sri Lanka in 2004. Two portable pitches were installed at Marrara in June 2003 for the Bangladesh test. The installation was supervised by Melbourne Cricket Club curator Tony Ware.
- Bangladesh defeated the NT Chief Minister's XI in Darwin in July 2003. Bangladesh won by two wickets after being given a second innings target of 187.
- Australia defeated Bangladesh by an innings and 132 runs in Darwin in July 2003. Bangladesh's best batsman Habibul Bashar scored 54 off 82 balls before being bowled by Stuart MacGill. Both Australian and Bangladesh players were presented with commemorative medallions by NT Minister for Sport John Ah Kit and Cricket Australia chairman Bob Merriman. The medallions were to mark the test cricket match between the two countries.
- Sri Lanka defeated the Northern Territory Chief Minister's XI in a four-day cricket match in June 2004. Sri Lanka won by five wickets, chasing 187 to win. Tillakaratne Dilshan was not out of 66.
- Australia defeated Sri Lanka at Marrara Oval in July 2004 by 149 runs. Sri Lanka was bowled out for 97 and 162. Australian bowler Michael Kasprowicz finished with figures of 7-39. Sri Lanka criticised the condition of the Mararra Oval wicket in the wake of the defeat. Acting Australian captain Adam Gilchrist stated that the wicket was "...not quite up to Test standard".
- Darwin hosted an AFL match between Collingwood and the Aboriginal All-Stars on 12 February 1994. The All-Stars beat Collingwood 13-10 (88) to 10-8 (68). Prime Minister Paul Keating tossed the coin at the beginning of the match.
- The Western Bulldogs defeated Essendon 18.12 (120) to 14.8 (92) in an Ansett Cup match on 13 February 1999.
- The Western Bulldogs defeated Carlton 17.14 (116) to 10.10 (70) at TIO Stadium on 18 June 2005. The match was played in front of 13,047 fans.
- Port Adelaide defeated the Western Bulldogs 14.21 (105) to 13.13 (91) on 7 August 2006 at TIO Stadium. The match was played on front of a record crowd of 14,100 people.
- The Western Bulldogs defeated The Fremantle Dockers by 26 points at TIO stadium on 16 June 2007.
- The Western Bulldogs defeated Port Adelaide 20.15 (135) to 11.15 (81) at TIO Stadium on 28 June 2008 in front of 11,400 fans. The victory gave the Bulldogs a temporary hold on the top of the AFL ladder.
- The Bangladesh national cricket team played three One Day International (ODI) matches in Australia in 2008 at Marrara Oval, Darwin. The Australians, captained by Michael Clarke, comfortably swept the series 3–0.
- The Western Bulldogs defeated Port Adelaide 21.11 (137) to 7.2. (44) at TIO Stadium on 13 June 2009.
- Port Adelaide defeated Richmond in an AFL match at TIO Stadium on 28 May 2011. The final score was 13.11 (89) to 10.14. (74).
- The Western Bulldogs defeated The Gold Coast Suns in an AFL match at TIO Stadium on 18 May 2012. The Bulldogs overcame a three-point deficit at halftime to win 9.18 (72) to 4.10 (34).
- The Western Bulldogs defeated Port Adelaide at TIO Stadium on 1 June 2013. The final score was 10.7 (67) to 8.10 (58).
- The Parramatta Eels were defeated by The West Tigers 20–4 in a NRL match at ANZAC Oval in Alice Springs on 16 February 2015. The West Tigers were presented with the RFDS Challenge trophy after their victory by Chief Minister Adam Giles, minister Gary Higgins and Royal Flying Doctor Service chief executive Mick Toomey. The Parramatta Eels were sponsored by the Northern Territory Government.
- The West Coast Eagles defeated The Melbourne Demons in an AFL match at TIO Stadium on 4 July 2015. The final score was 16.18 (114) to 9.6 (60).
- The Parramatta Eels defeated the Penrith Panthers 10–4 in an NRL match at TIO Stadium on 8 August 2015.
- Darwin hosted the quarter-final tie of the Davis Cup starting 17 July 2015. A grass stadium court and two practice courts were built for the event. Lleyton Hewitt led Australia to victory over Kazakhstan with a straights set win over Aleksandr Nedovyesov in the final deciding match. In doing so Australia came back from a 2–0 deficit. It was reported that 12,332 people attended the three-day quarter final tie.
- Hawthorn Football Club brought their 2013, 2014 and 2015 premiership cups to Darwin on 16 November 2015. The cups were on display at the Waratah Sports Club.
- Palmerston Magpies were affected by the Essendon supplements scandal when Alwyn Davey and Leroy Jetta were suspended in January 2016. Jetta played in the side's mid-field while Davey was the team's coach. Davey and Jetta were two of 34 current and former Essendon players banned for the 2016 season. The Northern Territory was the only place in Australia where Australian Rules Football was played at the time of the announcement of the suspensions.
- Peter "The Chief" Graham defeated Julius "Towering Inferno" Long for the World Boxing Foundation heavyweight championship at the Darwin Convention Centre on 27 February 2016. Graham won on points after a cut above his right eye caused the fight to be stopped. It was judged that the cut was a result of an accidental head clash. Graham was ahead on all three judges' scorecards after five rounds of the 12 round contest.
