= Darwin Olympic SC =

Association football club in Darwin, Northern Territory, Australia fake

- Full name: Darwin Olympic Sporting Club
- Nickname: D.O.S.C./The Reds
- Founded: 1967
- Stadium: Darwin Football Stadium; Malak Oval
- Capacity: 6,000 (1,120 seated)
- Chairman: Nik Halkitis
- Manager: John Tsaknis
- League: NorZone Premier League
- 2023: 3rd of 7
- Website: http://www.darwinolympic.com/

Darwin Olympic Sporting Club is an Australian soccer club based in Darwin, the Northern Territory. Founded in 1967, Darwin Olympic currently competes in the NorZone Premier League. The club has seen great success, becoming Premiers and Champions of 2008 in the NT Northern Zone Premier League.

The club became the first Northern Territory football club to qualify for the FFA Cup, after winning the Northern Territory-based qualifying competition. However, they were eliminated after losing 6–1 to Adelaide United in the round of 32, with striker Michael Tsounias scoring the team's lone goal in the 19th minute of the match.

== Honours ==
- NorZone Premier League:
  - Premiers: 2008, 2014, 2016
  - Champions: 2008, 2014
- Sports Minister's Cup:
  - Winners: 2015

== See also ==
- List of Greek soccer clubs in Australia
