= Football Northern Territory =

Governing body for soccer in the Northern Territory

- Formation: 2005; 21 years ago
- Headquarters: Darwin, Northern Territory, Australia
- Affiliations: Football Australia
- Website: footballnt.com.au

Football Northern Territory (FNT) is the state governing body for soccer in the Northern Territory, Australia. It is affiliated with Football Australia, the national governing body. The Territory is also separated into three zones – Northern, Central and FICA (Southern) – which have their own zone councils which locally administer their own league and cup competitions.

There is currently no overall champion – the regional winners in 2016 were Hellenic Athletic Club (Northern Zone) and Celtic (FICA).

The federation conducts the territory-wide Sport Minister's Cup, which doubles as qualification for the national FFA Cup.

== Clubs in NT ==
=== Northern Zone (NorZone) ===
- Casuarina FC
- Darwin Olympic
- Darwin Hearts
- Garuda FC
- Hellenic Athletic
- Mindil Aces
- Palmerston Rovers
- Port Darwin
- University Azzurri

=== Past Participant Clubs ===
- Darwin City Buffalos
- Darwin Lions (Pre-2007 known as Afro-Oz FC)
- Karama United
- Litchfield SC
- 1st Brigade
- Palmerston FC
- University Rangers
- Waratahs SC (2007 No longer a Registered Club)
- Greater Palmerston United
- Darwin Rovers
- Litchfield SC

=== Central Zone ===
Note: No competition in 2024.

- Borroloola FC
- Gove SC
- Katherine FC

=== Southern Zone Premier League ===
Organised by Football in Central Australia (FICA)

- Alice Springs Celtic
- Stormbirds SC
- Verdi FC
- MPH Vikings FC

=== Past Participant Clubs ===
- Gillen Scorpions
- Federals SC
- ASFA – (Not registered club, Academy team)
- Buckleys FC (Pre-2007 known as Town and Country Tavern)

== NT Australia Cup ==
Sports Minister's Cup
- Founded: 2016
- Teams: 13 (in 2025)
- Current champions: 2026 University Azzurri (2nd title)
- Most championships: Darwin Rovers, Darwin Olympic, Hellenic Athletic, University Azzurri (2 titles each)
- 2026 Australia Cup preliminary rounds

The male knock-out cup – now run annually with clubs from NorZone and FICA – is a single-leg knockout cup competition, first held as part of the preliminary rounds of the 2015 FFA Cup. It is the qualification route for the single NT federation representative for the FFA Cup, now known as the Australia Cup.

Since 2016 the final has been played for the Cup.

From 2015 to 2018 the winners of the NorZone and FICA met in the final; since 2019 the winners of FICA have qualified to the semi-final stage (FFA Cup preliminary Round 6).

Competition and Year	Winner	Score	Runners-up
2015 NT Final	Darwin Olympic	5–0	Alice Springs Celtic
2016 Sports Minister's Cup	Shamrock Rovers Darwin	5–0	Gillen Scorpions
2017 Sports Minister's Cup	Darwin Rovers	2–0	Alice Springs Celtic
2018 Sports Minister's Cup	Hellenic Athletic	9–0	Verdi FC
2019 Sports Minister's Cup	Darwin Olympic	2–2 (5–4 (p))	University Azzurri
2020	2020 FFA Cup cancelled due to the COVID-19 pandemic in Australia.		
2021 NT FFA Cup Final	Casuarina FC	2–1	Hellenic AC
2022 NT Australia Cup Final	Mindil Aces FC	2–0	Casuarina FC
2023 NT Australia Cup Final	Hellenic Athletic	3–1	Verdi FC
2024 NT Australia Cup Final	Darwin Hearts	3–1	Darwin Olympic
2025 NT Australia Cup Final	University Azzurri	3–0	Darwin Olympic
2026 NT Australia Cup Final	University Azzurri	6–1	Port Darwin

== See also ==
- Darwin Football Stadium
