= Darwin Football Stadium =

Sports stadium in Darwin, Australia

- Interactive map of Darwin Football Stadium
- Full name: Larrakia Park
- Location: Marrara, Northern Territory
- Coordinates: 12°23′47″S 130°52′51″E
- Owner: Northern Territory Government
- Capacity: 6,000 (1,120 seated)
- Surface: Grass

Construction
- Built: 2007
- Opened: 28 July 2007
- Cost: A$6.5m

Tenant
- Darwin Hearts FC Darwin Olympic SC

Darwin Football Stadium is a sports stadium in Darwin, Australia in the Marrara Sporting Complex, and is located adjacent to the TIO Stadium.

Work began on the stadium in 2007 and was officially opened on 28 July 2007 when it played host to an A-League Pre-Season Cup game between Perth Glory and Melbourne Victory.

The stadium has a seating capacity for up to 1,120 spectators, but can hold up to 6,000 including standing space.

It has hosted home ties for Darwin-based clubs in the Australia Cup.
