= Soccer records and statistics in Australia =

This article concerns soccer records in Australia. Unless otherwise stated, records are taken from the National Soccer League or A-League Men. Where a different record exists for the top flight (National Soccer League 1977–2004, and A-League Men 2005–present), this is also given.

== National leagues ==
Records in this section refer to the Australian top division, as a combination of the A-League Men or National Soccer League.

=== Titles ===
- Most Premiership titles: 5, South Melbourne
- Most Championship titles: 5, Sydney FC
- Most consecutive Premiership titles: 3, Melbourne City, 2020–21, 2021–22, 2022–23
- Most consecutive Championship titles: 3, Sydney City: 1980, 1981, 1982

=== Representation ===
- Most seasons overall: 29 seasons, Marconi Stallions and South Melbourne
- Fewest seasons overall: 1 season, Canterbury Marrickville, Collingwood Warriors, Mooroolbark, and Wollongong United

=== Wins ===
- Most wins overall: 378, South Melbourne
- Most consecutive wins: 10, Western Sydney Wanderers (13 January 2013 – 16 March 2013)
- Most wins in a season: 21, South Melbourne (National Soccer League, 2000–01)
- Fewest wins in a season: 1, New Zealand Knights (A-League, 2005–06)

=== Draws ===
- Most draws overall: 194, Adelaide City
- Most consecutive draws: 6, Wellington Phoenix (4 September 2009 to 17 October 2009)
- Most draws in a season: 15, Wollongong City (National Soccer League, 1983)
- Fewest draws in a season: 1, Canberra City (National Soccer League, 1984)

=== Losses ===
- Most losses overall: 284, Perth Glory
- Most consecutive losses: 16, Canberra Cosmos (30 March 1998 to 10 January 1999)
- Most losses in a season: 24, joint record:
  - Newcastle Breakers (National Soccer League, 1995–96)
  - Sydney United (National Soccer League, 1999–2000)
- Fewest losses in a season: 1, joint record:
  - Perth Glory (National Soccer League, 2001–02)
  - Brisbane Roar (A-League, 2011–12)
  - Sydney FC (A-League, 2016–17)

=== Points ===
- Most points overall: 791, South Melbourne
- Most points in a season
  - 4 points for a win: 70, Melbourne Knights (National Soccer League, 1994–95)
  - 3 points for a win: 69, South Melbourne (National Soccer League, 2000–01)
  - 2 points for a win: 45, Sydney City (National Soccer League, 1982)
- Fewest points in a season (ignoring points deductions): 6, New Zealand Knights (A-League, 2005–06)

Best fan base in the aleauge: Newcastle Jets

=== Games without a defeat ===
- Most consecutive matches without a defeat: 36, Brisbane Roar (18 September 2010 to 26 November 2011)

=== Goals ===
- Most goals scored in a league season: 80, Wollongong Wolves (National Soccer League, 2000–01)
- Most goals scored in total: 1,293, Marconi Stallions
- Most goals conceded in a league season: 77, Newcastle Breakers (National Soccer League, 1995–96)
- Fewest goals conceded in a league season: 12, Sydney FC (A-League, 2016–17)
- Best goal difference in a season: +46, Sydney City (1984), South Melbourne (2000–01)
- Worst goal difference in a season: –48, Heidelberg United (1993–94)
- Most consecutive games without scoring a goal: 6, joint record:
  - Parramatta Eagles (11 December 1993 to 9 January 1994)
  - Preston Lions (11 October 1987 to 28 February 1988)
  - Preston Lions (12 July 1989 to 18 November 1989)
  - New Zealand Knights (10 September 2006 to 14 October 2006)
  - Newcastle Jets (4 December 2015 to 9 January 2016)

=== Scorelines ===
- Record win: Marconi Stallions 9–0 Blacktown City (16 March 1980)
- Highest scoring draw: Newcastle Breakers 5–5 Canberra Cosmos (16 February 1996)

=== Transfers ===
- Highest transfer fee received: A$2.6 million, Hayden Matthews, from Sydney FC to Portsmouth FC (2025)

=== Individual ===
==== Appearances ====
- Most career appearances: 522, Alex Tobin (1984 to 2004)
- Most career appearances as a goalkeeper: 479, Clint Bolton (1993 to 2013)
- Most career appearances as a substitute: 115, Matt Simon (2006 to 2020)
- Most career appearances at one club: 446, Sergio Melta (Adelaide City, 1977 to 1995)
- Most consecutive appearances: 214, Bobby Russell (1980 to 1988)
- Youngest player: Daniel Watkins, 14 years and 268 days (for Parramatta Eagles vs. Morwell Falcons, 2 April 1995)
- Oldest player: Bobby Charlton, 42 years and 150 days (for Blacktown City vs. St George, 9 March 1980)
- Most championships won: 5
  - Gerry Gomez (1980, 1981, 1982, 1988, 1989)
  - Tony Pezzano (1977, 1980, 1981, 1987, 1993)
  - Michael Theo (2007, 2009, 2011, 2012, 2014)
- Most clubs played by a single player: 9
  - John Markovski (Sunshine George Cross, Preston Makedonia, Melbourne Knights, Marconi Stallions, Morwell Falcons, Canberra Cosmos, Carlton, Perth Glory, Football Kingz)
  - Liam Reddy (Parramatta Power, Sydney United, Newcastle Jets, Brisbane Roar, Wellington Phoenix, Sydney FC, Central Coast Mariners, Western Sydney Wanderers, Perth Glory

==== Goals ====
- Most career league goals: 240, Damian Mori
- Most goals in a league season: 31, Damian Mori (1995–96)
- Most goals in a match: 6, joint record:
  - Pat Brodnik (for Wollongong Wolves vs. West Adelaide, 18 March 1990)
  - Ivan Kelic (for Melbourne Knights vs. Wollongong Macedonia, 24 March 1991)
- Most goals a substitute: 20, Henrique
- Most consecutive matches scored in: 10, Jamie Maclaren (10 matches, for Melbourne City, 2022 to 2023)
- Fastest goal: 3.7 seconds, Damian Mori (for Adelaide City vs. Sydney United, 3 December 1995)
- Fastest hat-trick (time between first and third goals): 6 minutes, joint record:
  - Jason Bennett (for Newcastle Breakers, 11 October 1996)
  - Besart Berisha (for Brisbane Roar, 28 October 2011)
- Fastest hat-trick from start of match: 11 minutes, Gary Cole (for Heidelberg United vs. West Adelaide, 16 March 1980)
- Fastest goal by a substitute: 18 seconds, Nebojša Marinković (for Perth Glory vs. Melbourne City, 16 April 2017)
- Fastest player to 100 goals: Jamie Maclaren — 144 games
- Longest goalkeeping run without conceding a goal: 728 minutes, Jeff Olver (Heidelberg, 15 July 1984 to 9 September 1984)
- Youngest goalscorer: Danny Wright, 15 years and 289 days (for Brisbane Lions vs. Blacktown City, 17 August 1980)
- Oldest goalscorer: Bobby Charlton, 42 years and 150 days (for Blacktown City vs. St George-Budapest, 9 March 1980)

==== Disciplinary ====
- Most sending-offs: 11, Andrew Marth
- Most sending-offs in a season: 3
  - Con Anthopoulos, 1997–98
  - Besart Berisha, 2013–14
  - Nigel Boogaard, 2015–16
  - Harrison Delbridge, 2019–20
  - Brian Kaltak, 2022–23
- Youngest player sent off: Mohamed Toure, 17 years, 35 days (for Adelaide United vs. Western United, 3 April 2021)
- Oldest player sent off: Thomas Sørensen, 40 years, 118 days (for Melbourne City vs. Wellington Phoenix, 8 October 2016)

== Australia Cup ==
=== Final ===
==== Team ====
- Most wins: 3, Adelaide United (2014, 2018, 2019)
- Most consecutive wins: 2, Adelaide United (2018, 2019)
- Most consecutive defeats in finals: 2, Perth Glory (2014, 2015)
- Most appearances in finals: 4, Adelaide United (2014, 2017, 2018, 2019)
- Most Final appearances without win: 2, Perth Glory (2014, 2015)
- Most Final appearances without defeat: 2, Melbourne Victory (2015, 2021)
- Longest winning streak in finals: 2, Adelaide United (2018, 2019)
- Biggest win: 4 goals, Adelaide United 4–0 Melbourne City (2019)
- Most goals in a final: 4 goals, Adelaide United 4–0 Melbourne City (2019)
- Most defeats in finals: 2, joint record:
  - Perth Glory (2014, 2015)
  - Sydney FC (2016, 2018)

==== Individual ====
- Most wins: 3, joint record:
  - Michael Marrone (Adelaide United: 2014, 2018, 2019)
  - Michael Jakobsen (Melbourne City: 2016 & Adelaide United: 2018, 2019)
- Most appearances in finals: 4, Michael Marrone (Adelaide United: 2014, 2017, 2018, 2019)
- Most goals in a final: 2, Craig Goodwin (Adelaide United: 2018)
- Most goals in finals: 2, joint record:
  - Craig Goodwin (Adelaide United) (2 in 2018)
  - Nikola Mileusnic (Adelaide United) (1 in 2017, 1 in 2019)
  - Oliver Bozanic (Melbourne Victory) (1 in 2015) & (Central Coast Mariners) (1 in 2021)
  - Al Hassan Toure (Adelaide United) (1 in 2019) & (Macarthur FC) (1 in 2022)
- Youngest Australia Cup finalist: Al Hassan Toure (Adelaide United, 19 years, 146 days
- Youngest player to score in an Australia Cup Final: Al Hassan Toure (Adelaide United, 19 years, 146 days)

=== All rounds ===
This section refers to the Round of 32 onwards, and not the preliminary rounds for member federations.

- Most Australia Cup goals scored: 68, Sydney FC
- Most Australia Cup goals conceded: 33, Sydney United 58
- Highest Australia Cup goal difference: +40, Sydney FC
- Most Australia Cup games played: 30, Adelaide United
- Most Australia Cup games won: 25, Adelaide United
- Most Australia Cup games lost: 8, joint record
  - Brisbane Roar
  - Central Coast Mariners
  - Newcastle Jets
  - Perth Glory
  - Wellington Phoenix
  - Western Sydney Wanderers
- Most Australia Cup games drawn: 3, joint record:
  - Perth Glory
  - Sydney United 58
- Largest winning margin: Shamrock Rovers Darwin 0–8 Sydney FC (Round of 32, 2 August 2017)
- Longest penalty shootout: 22 penalties, Sydney FC 10–9 Central Coast Mariners (Round of 32, 13 August 2023)
- Most consecutive games without defeat: 12, Adelaide United (1 August 2018 to 17 October 2021)
- Most career appearances: 25, Andrew Redmayne
- Most career goals: 12, Besart Berisha
- Most goals by a player in a single Australia Cup season: 8, Bobô (for Sydney FC in 2017)
- Most goals by a player in a single Australia Cup game: 5, Lachlan Brook (for Western Sydney Wanderers in 2023)
- Youngest player: Ymer Abili, 13 years and 243 days (for Oakleigh Cannons vs. Macarthur FC, Semi-finals, 2022)
- Oldest player: Taiki Kudo, 45 years and 254 days (for Mindil Aces vs. Avondale FC, Round of 32, 2022)

=== Miscellaneous ===
- Most clubs competing in a season: 778 (2023)

== Attendance records ==
- Record attendance: 104,098 – Spain vs. Cameroon, played at Stadium Australia, 2000 Sumer Olympics men's tournament gold medal match (30 September 2000)
- Record national team attendance: 95,103 – Australia vs. Greece, played at the Melbourne Cricket Ground, Friendly (25 May 2006)
- Record national league attendance: 61,880 – Western Sydney Wanderers vs. Sydney FC, played at Stadium Australia, 2016–17 A-League (8 October 2016)
- Record national cup attendance: 18,751 – Melbourne City vs. Sydney FC, played at Melbourne Rectangular Stadium, FFA Cup Final (30 November 2016)
- Record lowest attendance: (Note: apart from matches specifically played behind closed doors or because of the COVID-19 pandemic in Australia) 38 – Wellington Phoenix vs. Brisbane Roar played at Leichhardt Oval, 2021–22 A-League Men (16 February 2022)

In April 2024, the 2023–24 A-League Women season set the record for the most attended season of any women's sport in Australian history, with the season recording a total attendance of 284,551 on 15 April 2024, and finishing with a final total attendance of 312,199.

== List of Australian record competition winners ==
These tables list the clubs that have won honours an Australian record number of times. It lists all competitions organised by Asian Football Confederation, Oceanian Football Confederation and FIFA as well as competitions organised by the Australian governing body Football Australia.

=== Ongoing competitions ===
Australia record winners of all ongoing competitions
Competition	Club	Total wins	Most recent	Notes
Australian Premiers	South Melbourne	5	2001	
Australian Champions	Sydney FC	5	2020	
Australia Cup	Adelaide United	3	2019	
AFC Champions League Elite	Western Sydney Wanderers	1	2014	
OFC Men's Champions League	Adelaide City, South Melbourne, Wollongong Wolves and Sydney FC	1	2005	

=== Discontinued competitions ===
Australian record winners of defunct competitions
Competition	Club	Total wins	Most recent	Notes
A-League Pre-season Challenge Cup	Adelaide United	2	2007	
Australia Cup (1962–1968)	Hakoah Sydney City East	2	1968	
NSL Cup	Adelaide City	3	1992	

== Managers ==
- Most Championship wins: 3, joint record:
  - Eddie Thomson (Sydney City)
  - Graham Arnold (Central Coast Mariners and Sydney FC)
- Most top-flight league games coached: 468, Zoran Matić
- Most OFC Champions League/AFC Champions League wins: 12, Tony Popovic

== See also ==
- List of soccer clubs in Australia by competitive honours won
- Australia men's national soccer team records and statistics
- A-League Men records and statistics
