= List of Adelaide United FC seasons =

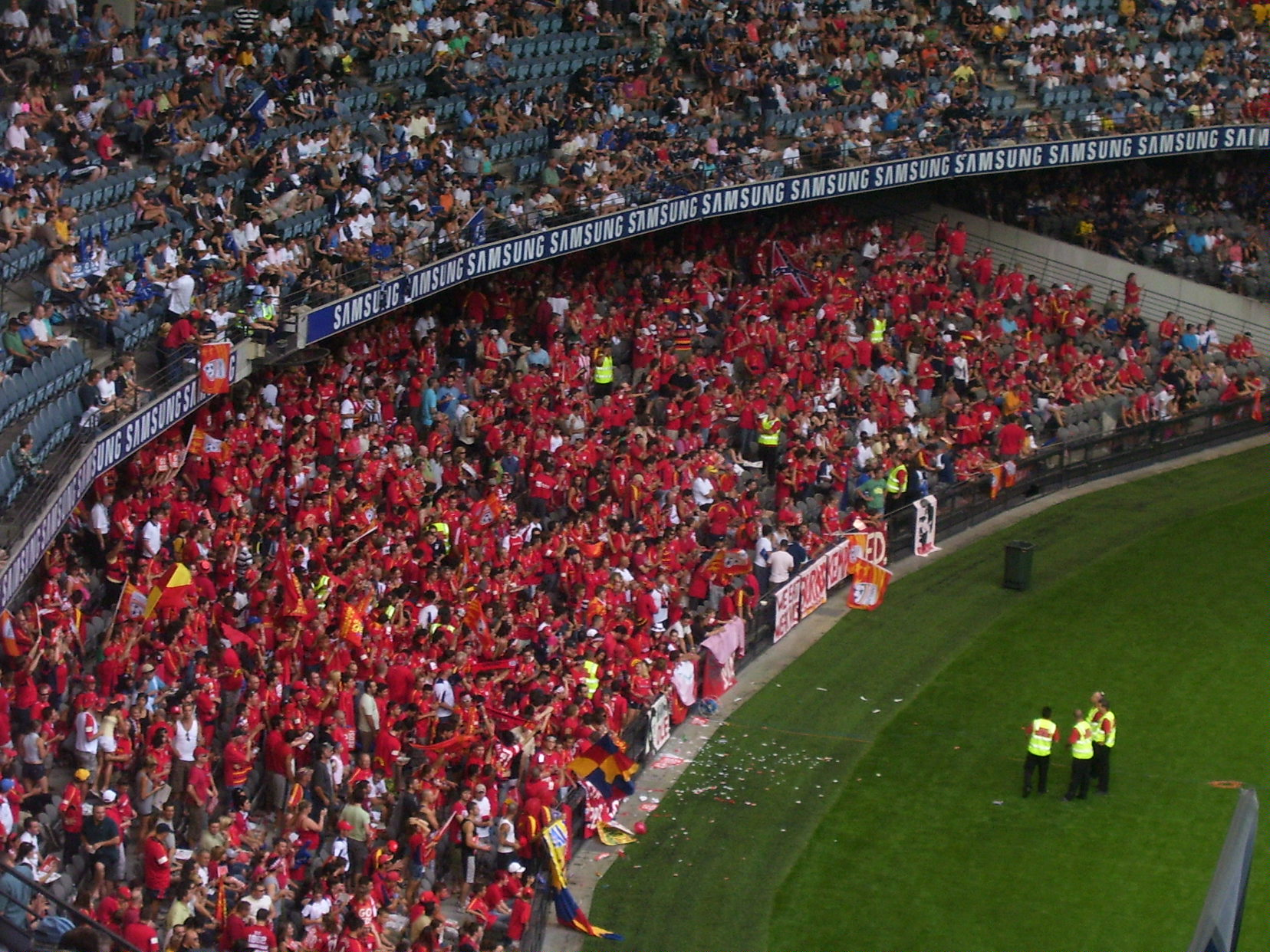
Adelaide United supporters at the 2007 A-League Grand Final

Adelaide United Football Club, is an Australian professional association football club based in Hindmarsh, Adelaide. The club was founded in September 2003 as they competed in the final season of the National Soccer League (NSL) as they replaced Adelaide City in the league until 2004, when they announced their team to compete in the A-League Men which was the replacement for the NSL.

== History ==
Adelaide United were formed for the final season of the National Soccer League in the 2003–04 season finishing third place and the Preliminary Final. The first season of the A-League Men in 2005–06 saw the club win the Premiership before losing to Central Coast Mariners in the Preliminary Final. Ultimately finishing second in the league and runners-up in the Grand Final both losing to Melbourne Victory for the 2006–07 season, Adelaide United won the second edition of the A-League Pre-Season Challenge Cup, defeating the Central Coast Mariners 5–4 on penalties after a 1–1 draw and qualified for the AFC Champions League for the first time being knocked out in the group stage. Adelaide missed out on A-League Finals for the first time in their history in the 2007–08 finishing 6th, but winning back-to-back Pre-Season Challenge Cup titles by winning the Final 2–1 against the Perth Glory (the last time until seven years the club won a trophy), and becoming the first Australian club to reach the AFC Champions League Final ultimately losing 5–0 on aggregate. In 2008–09, Adelaide United was again defeated in the A-League premiership and championship to Melbourne Victory, and finishing last for the first time in 2009–10. Sergio van Dijk scored 17 goals in the 2010–11 season; the most ever in a season for Adelaide United and winning the Golden Boot as the club made third place and semi-final finish. Two further seasons of no podium finishes and elimination final knockouts in the A-League occurred for the next two seasons.

In 2014, Adelaide United won the inaugural FFA Cup (now Australia Cup) in the 2014–15 season, defeating the Perth Glory 1–0 via Sergio Cirio, winning their first club trophy in seven years. The 2015–16 season saw Adelaide United win the Double for the first time, doing so by a slow start of eight winless games and a long undefeated run (with a one game exception) towards the Premiership and winning the Grand Final 3–1 against the Western Sydney Wanderers. The Double defense season in 2016–17 had Adelaide only finish 9th and missing Finals for the first time in four years. Since 2017, Adelaide United qualified for three consecutive FFA Cups, losing in 2017 against Sydney FC 2–1 after extra time, but winning back-to-back titles after in 2018 (2–1 against Sydney FC) and 2019 (4–0 against Melbourne City and currently their last club honour). A COVID-19 affected A-League campaign in the 2019–20 season saw Adelaide miss out on finals. Since 2020, Adelaide United have finished their last three Finals series campaigns in the semi-finals.

== Key ==
Key to league competitions:

- A-League Men – The first division of Australian soccer since 2005–06.
- National Soccer League (NSL) – The former first division of Australian soccer until 2003–04.

Key to colours and symbols:

1st / W	First place / Winners
2nd / RU	Second place / Runners-up
3rd	Third place
♦	Top scorer in division

Key to league record:

- Season = The year and article of the season
- Pos = Final position
- Pld = Matches played
- W = Matches won
- D = Matches drawn
- L = Matches lost
- GF = Goals scored
- GA = Goals against
- Pts = Points

Key to cup record:

- En-dash (–) = Adelaide United did not participate or competition was not held
- QPO = Qualifying play-off
- PR = Preliminary round
- Group = Group stage
- RO32 = Round of 32
- RO16 = Round of 16
- QF = Quarter-finals
- SF = Semi-finals
- PF = Preliminary final
- RU = Runners-up
- W = Winners

== Seasons ==
Results of league and cup competitions by season
Season	Division	Pld	W	D	L	GF	GA	Pts	Pos	Finals	National Cup	Competition	Result	Player(s)	Goals
Season	League										National Cup	Other / Asia		Top goalscorer(s) (Note: Includes all competitions.)	
2003–04	National Soccer League	24	11	7	6	28	25	40	3rd	PF	—	—		(Australia) Carl Veart	12
2004–05	No competition due to the collapse of the National Soccer League														
2005–06	A-League	21	13	4	4	33	25	43	1st	PF	Group	—		(Australia) Carl Veart	7
2006–07	A-League	21	10	3	8	32	27	33	2nd	RU	W	Champions League	Group	(Australia) Carl Veart	8
2007–08	A-League	21	6	8	7	31	29	26	6th	DNQ	W	Champions League	RU	(Australia) Bruce Djite	9
2008–09	A-League	21	11	5	5	31	10	38	2nd	RU	Group	Club World Cup	QF	(Brazil) Cristiano	12
2009–10	A-League	27	7	8	12	24	33	29	10th	DNQ	—	Champions League	RO16	(Australia) Travis Dodd (Australia) Mathew Leckie (Australia) Lucas Pantelis	5
2010–11	A-League	30	15	5	10	51	36	50	3rd	SF	—	—		(Indonesia) Sergio van Dijk	17 ♦
2011–12	A-League	27	5	10	12	26	44	25	9th	DNQ	—	Champions League	QF	(Indonesia) Sergio van Dijk	10
2012–13	A-League	27	12	5	10	38	37	41	4th	EF	—	—		(Australia) Dario Vidošić	10
2013–14	A-League	27	10	8	9	45	36	38	6th	EF	—	—		(Portugal) Fábio Ferreira (Argentina) Jerónimo Neumann	9
2014–15	A-League	27	14	4	9	45	35	46	3rd	SF	W	—		(Spain) Sergio Cirio	13
2015–16	A-League	27	14	7	6	45	28	49	1st	W	QF	Champions League	QPO	(Australia) Bruce Djite (Spain) Pablo Sánchez	11
2016–17	A-League	27	5	8	14	25	46	23	9th	DNQ	RO32	Champions League	Group	(Senegal) Baba Diawara (Australia) Dylan McGowan	5
2017–18	A-League	27	11	6	10	36	38	39	5th	EF	RU	—		(Denmark) Johan Absalonsen	8
2018–19	A-League	27	12	8	7	37	32	44	4th	SF	W	—		(Australia) Craig Goodwin	14
2019–20	A-League	26	11	3	12	44	49	36	7th	DNQ	W	—		(Australia) Riley McGree	13
2020–21	A-League	26	11	6	9	39	41	39	5th	SF	—	—		(Australia) Tomi Juric	9
2021–22	A-League Men	26	12	7	7	38	31	43	4th	SF	QF	—		(Australia) Craig Goodwin	12
2022–23	A-League Men	26	11	9	6	53	46	42	3rd	SF	QF	—		(Australia) Craig Goodwin	15
2023–24	A-League Men	27	9	5	13	52	53	32	8th	DNQ	RO16	—		(Japan) Hiroshi Ibusuki	15
2024–25	A-League Men	26	10	8	8	53	55	38	6th	EF	SF	—		(Australia) Archie Goodwin	13 ♦
2025–26	A-League Men	26	12	7	7	46	36	43	2nd	SF	RO32	—		(Australia) Luka Jovanovic	11 ♦
2026–27	A-League Men	To be determined									RO32	Champions League Elite Champions League Two	PR Group	To be determined	
