= 2021 FFA Cup final =

Final game for 2021 season of Australian knockout soccer competition

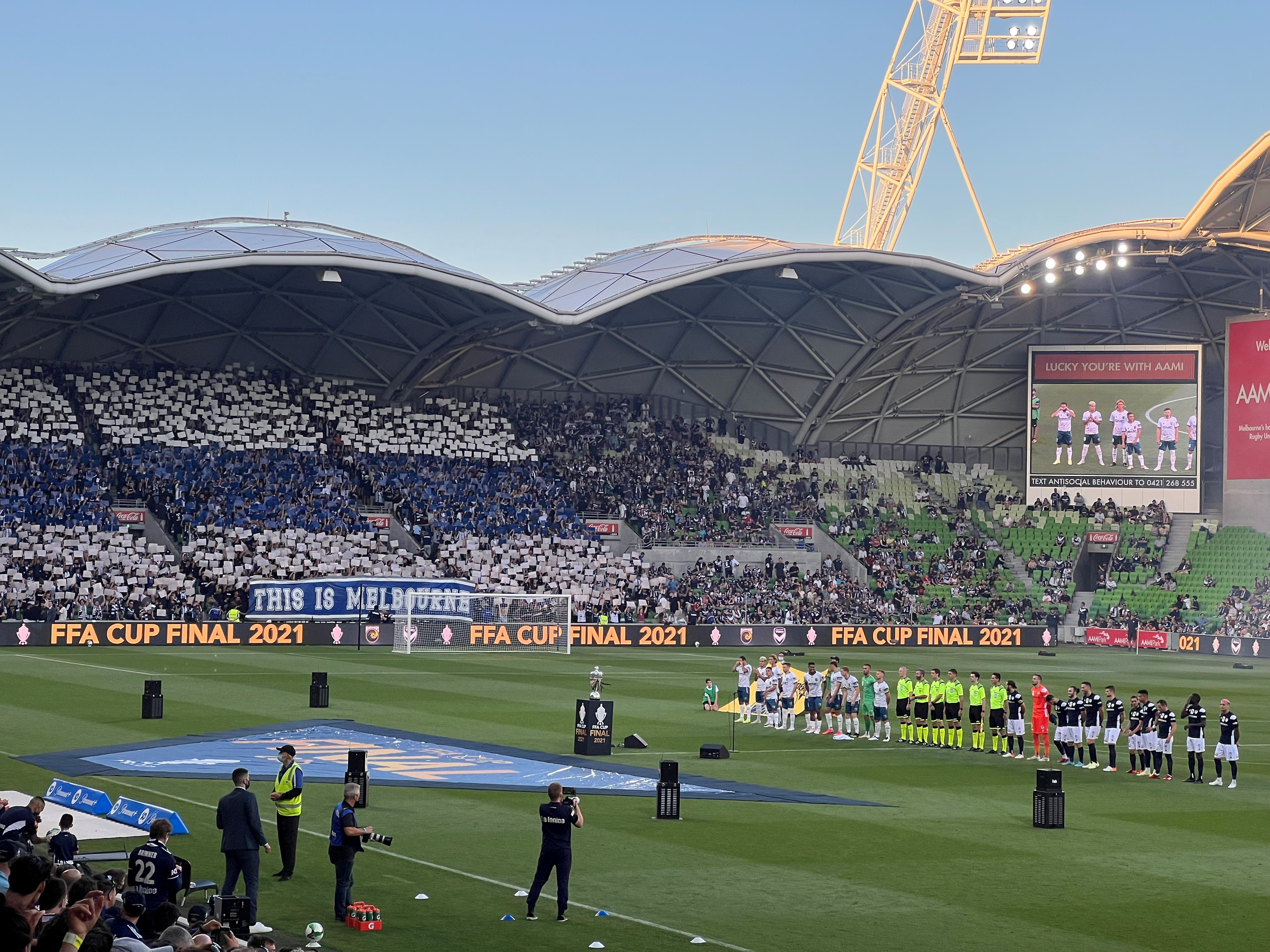
- Event: 2021 FFA Cup
Melbourne Victory	Central Coast Mariners
2	1
- Date: 5 February 2022
- Venue: AAMI Park, Melbourne
- Man of the Match: Jake Brimmer and Kye Rowles
- Referee: Shaun Evans
- Attendance: 15,343
- Weather: Sunny; 27 °C (81 °F)

The 2021 FFA Cup final was the final match of the 2021 FFA Cup, Australia's main soccer cup competition. It was contested between Melbourne Victory and Central Coast Mariners on 5 February 2022 at the AAMI Park in Melbourne.

The 2021 final was the first since the 2019 FFA Cup Final, after the 2020 FFA Cup was cancelled due to the COVID-19 pandemic in Australia. Following the quarter-final win for Melbourne Victory against Adelaide United, the final would not feature Adelaide for the first time since 2016.

This was Mariners' first FFA Cup final, and their first final in any competition since their win in the 2013 A-League Grand Final. This was Victory's second FFA Cup final and the first since 2015, in which they were victorious.

The 2021 FFA Cup Final was the last final played under the FFA Cup name; from 2022, the competition will be known as the Australia Cup.

== Route to the final ==
Melbourne Victory		Round	Central Coast Mariners	
Opponent	Result		Opponent	Result
Perth Glory	1–1 (A) (4–3 p)	A-League playoff round		
Adelaide City	1–0 (A)	Round of 32	Blacktown City	1–0 (A)
Gold Coast Knights	2–1 (a.e.t.) (A)	Round of 16	Wollongong Wolves	2–1 (A)
Adelaide United	2–1 (A)	Quarter-finals	APIA Leichhardt	6–0 (A)
Wellington Phoenix	4–1 (H)	Semi-finals	Sydney FC	1–0 (A)
Note: In all results above, the score of the finalist is given first (H: home; A: away).

Melbourne Victory, as an A-League team finishing in the bottom four in the 2020–21 A-League, entered into an A-League playoff round..

Meanwhile, Central Coast Mariners entered in the round of 32. Their first match was away to National Premier Leagues NSW side Blacktown City in Mudgee. The Mariners won 1–0 through a second-half goal to Béni Nkololo. In the next round they drew another NPL NSW side, Wollongong Wolves. They went behind early after goalkeeper Mark Birighitti conceded a penalty and was sent off for violent conduct, however, recovered to win 2–1 through second-half goals to Moresche and debutant Harry McCarthy. In the quarter-finals, the Mariners drew a third NPL NSW side, APIA Leichhardt, who upset A-League Men side Western Sydney Wanderers in the previous round. The Mariners won 6–0 at Leichhardt Stadium to advance to the semifinals. In the semifinals, the Mariners defeated Sydney FC 1–0 after Marco Ureña scored a second-half penalty.

== Pre-match ==
=== Venue selection ===
The Final was originally intended to be at a neutral venue. However, on 27 January 2022, it was confirmed that the winner of the semi-final match between Central Coast Mariners and Melbourne Victory would host the final, subject to a random draw and the eventual participants. After winning the semi-final, Melbourne Victory was confirmed as the host.

== Match ==
=== Details ===
5 February 2022
20:00 AEDT

Melbourne Victory (1)	2–1	Central Coast Mariners (1)
Davidson 70'; Ikonomidis 90+5'	Report	Bozanic 90+7'

AAMI Park, Melbourne
Attendance: 15,343
Referee: Shaun Evans

Melbourne Victory	Central Coast Mariners

GK	20	(Croatia) Ivan Kelava
RB	2	(Australia) Jason Geria
CB	17	(Australia) Brendan Hamill
CB	5	(Australia) Matthew Spiranovic
LB	3	(Australia) Jason Davidson
DM	6	(Australia) Leigh Broxham
DM	8	(Australia) Joshua Brillante (c)
AM	22	(Australia) Jake Brimmer		(substituted off) 90+2'
LW	11	(Australia) Ben Folami	(yellow card) 72'	(substituted off) 74'
CF	18	(Australia) Nicholas D'Agostino		(substituted off) 75'
RW	23	(New Zealand) Marco Rojas		(substituted off) 82'
Substitutes:
GK	1	(Australia) Matt Acton
DF	15	(Australia) Aaron Anderson
DF	16	(Australia) Stefan Nigro
MF	7	(Australia) Chris Ikonomidis		(substituted on) 74'
MF	13	(Australia) Birkan Kirdar		(substituted on) 90+2'
FW	9	(Italy) Francesco Margiotta		(substituted on) 75'
FW	24	(Australia) Nishan Velupillay		(substituted on) 82'
Manager:
(Australia) Tony Popovic

GK	1	(Australia) Mark Birighitti
RB	3	(Australia) Lewis Miller
CB	23	(Fiji) Dan Hall
CB	14	(Australia) Kye Rowles
LB	18	(Australia) Jacob Farrell
RM	4	(Australia) Josh Nisbet		(substituted off) 80'
CM	34	(Australia) Harrison Steele	(yellow card) 69'	(substituted off) 73'
CM	8	(Australia) Oliver Bozanic (c)
LM	27	(Germany) Nicolai Müller		(substituted off) 56'
CF	12	(Costa Rica) Marco Ureña
CF	10	(Brazil) Moresche		(substituted off) 73'
Substitutes:
GK	30	(Australia) Patrick Beach
DF	15	(New Zealand) Storm Roux
DF	21	(Australia) Ruon Tongyik
MF	7	(Japan) Cy Goddard		(substituted on) 73'
MF	11	(France) Béni Nkololo		(substituted on) 56'
MF	16	(Australia) Max Balard		(substituted on) 73'
MF	36	(Australia) Garang Kuol		(substituted on) 80'
Manager:
(Scotland) Nick Montgomery

Mark Viduka Medal:
Jake Brimmer (Melbourne Victory)
Kye Rowles (Central Coast Mariners)

Assistant referees:
Kearney Robinson
David Walsh
Fourth official:
Andrew Lindsay
Additional assistant referees:
Jonathan Barreiro
Kurt Ams

Match rules:

- 90 minutes.
- 30 minutes of extra time if necessary.
- Penalty shoot-out if scores still level.
- Seven named substitutes, of which up to five may be used.

=== Statistics ===
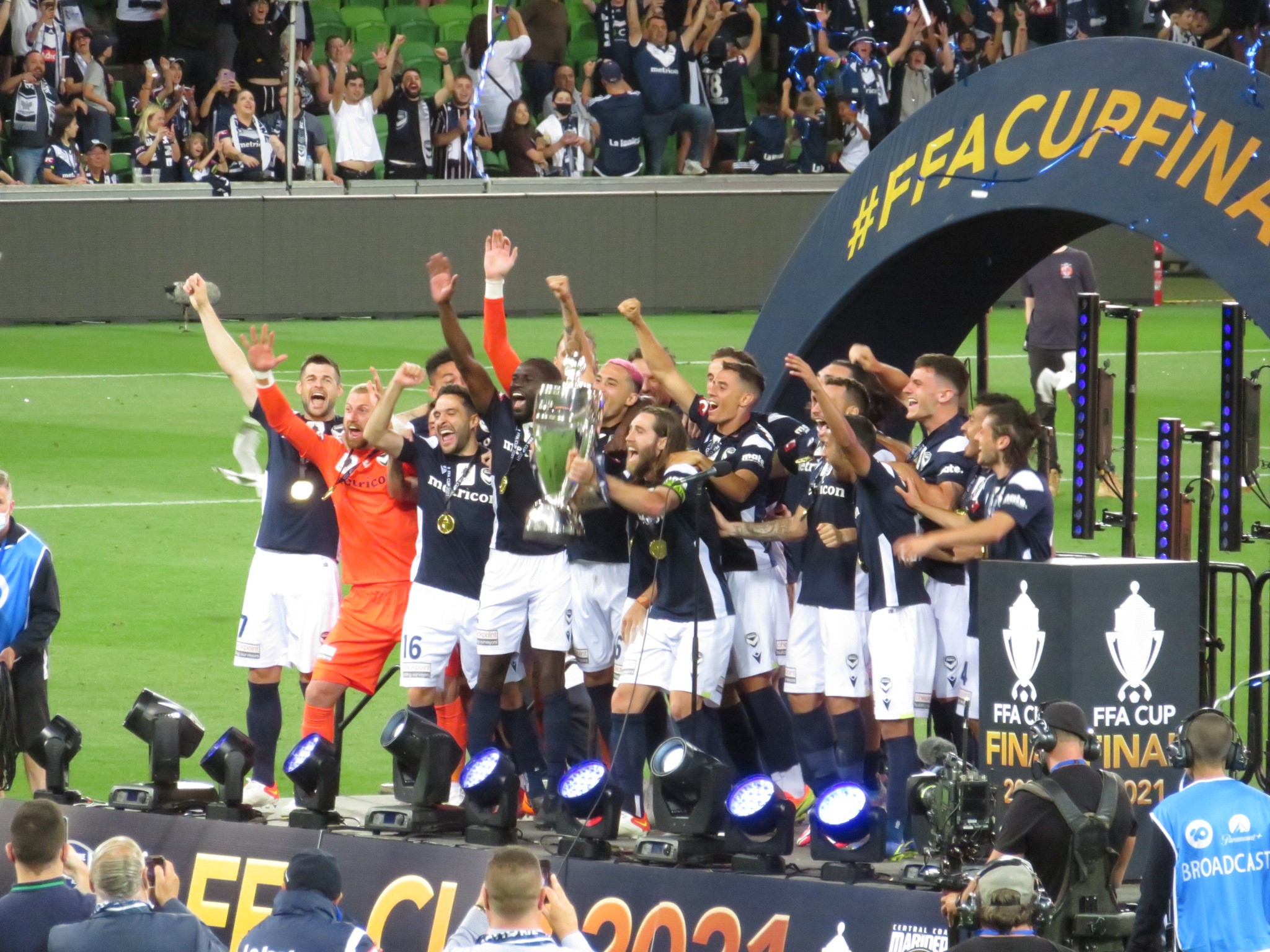
Victory players lifting the trophy

Statistics	Melbourne Victory	Central Coast Mariners
Goals scored	2	1
Total shots	18	7
Shots on target	4	2
Ball possession	52%	48%
Corner kicks	11	2
Fouls committed	13	17
Offsides	1	2
Yellow cards	1	1
Red cards	0	0
