= List of Melbourne City FC head coaches =

Melbourne City Football Club is an Australian professional association football club based in Cranbourne East, Melbourne. The club was formed 2009 as Melbourne Heart before it was renamed to Melbourne City in 2014. They were the second Victorian club admitted into the A-League Men in 2010.

There have been five permanent and two caretaker managers of Melbourne City since 2010; John van 't Schip has managed the club in two separate spells.

This chronological list comprises all those who have held the position of manager of the first team of Melbourne City since their foundation in 2009. Each manager's entry includes his dates of tenure and the club's overall competitive record (in terms of matches won, drawn and lost), honours won and significant achievements while under his care. Caretaker managers are included, where known, as well as those who have been in permanent charge.

== Managers ==
- Manager dates and nationalities are sourced from worldfootball.net for van 't Schnip to Aloisi and Soccerbase thereafter for van 't Schnip to Vidmar. Statistics are sourced from ALeagueStats.com. Names of caretaker managers are supplied where known, and periods of caretaker management are highlighted in italics and marked caretaker or caretaker, then permanent appointment, depending on the scenario. Win percentage is rounded to two decimal places.
- Only first-team competitive matches are counted. Wins, losses and draws are results at the final whistle; the results of penalty shoot-outs are not counted.

Statistics are complete as of 10 November 2024.

Key

- M = matches played; W = matches won; D = matches drawn; L = matches lost; GF = Goals for; GA = Goals against; Win % = percentage of total matches won
- † Managers with this background and symbol in the "Name" column are italicised to denote caretaker appointments.
- ‡ Managers with this background and symbol in the "Name" column are italicised to denote caretaker appointments promoted to full-time manager.

List of Melbourne City FC managers
Name	Nationality	From	To	M	W	D	L	GF	GA	Win %	Honours	Notes
John van 't Schip	Netherlands	13 October 2009	5 April 2012	58	17	21	20	67	78	29.31		
John Aloisi	Australia	8 May 2012	29 December 2013	39	8	7	24	40	52	20.51		
John van 't Schip	Netherlands	30 December 2013	5 January 2017	96	43	22	31	178	93	44.79	FFA Cup winners: 2016	
Michael Valkanis †	Australia	5 January 2017	19 June 2017	15	6	1	8	27	26	40.00		
Warren Joyce	England	19 June 2017	1 June 2019	63	29	11	23	91	62	46.03		
Erick Mombaerts	France	1 June 2019	3 September 2020	33	19	5	9	64	42	57.58		(Note: Patrick Kisnorbo was a fill-in coach between Mombaerts' contract. Kisnorbo's record was W1-D0-L1, scoring 5 goals and conceding 4 goals.)
Patrick Kisnorbo	Australia	3 September 2020	23 November 2022	74	43	17	14	147	78	58.11	A-League Men premiers: 2020–21, 2021–22; A-League Men champions: 2021	(Note: Des Buckingham was a fill-in coach between Kisnorbo's contract. Buckingham's record was W3-D0-L0, scoring 8 goals and conceding 3 goals.)
Rado Vidošić ‡	Australia	23 November 2022	1 November 2023	32	17	8	7	67	49	53.13	A-League Men premiers: 2022–23	(Note: Petr Kratky was a fill-in coach between Vidošić's contract. Kratky's record was W1-D0-L0, scoring 2 goals and conceding 0 goals.)
Aurelio Vidmar	Australia	1 November 2023	Present	36	15	8	13	70	36	41.67		
