= Mark Viduka Medal =

Australian association football award

- Sport: Association football
- Competition: Australia Cup
- Awarded for: being the best performing player/s in an Australia Cup final
- Country: Australia
- Presented by: Football Australia

History
- First award: 2014; 12 years ago
- Editions: 11 (as of 2025)
- First winner: (Spain) Sergio Cirio
- Most recent: (Spain) Javier Lopez (2026)
- Website: australiacup.com.au/mark-viduka-medal

The Mark Viduka Medal is an association football award that recognises the best adjudged player/s from the final of the Australia Cup (formally the FFA Cup) each year. Introduced in the first edition of the competition in 2014, the award is named after Mark Viduka, who captained the Australian national team during the 2006 FIFA World Cup. Presented by Football Australia following the final, the recipient/s are determined by a panel of three judges consisting of Viduka, the Australian national team manager and Football Australia's national technical director.

== Award recipients ==
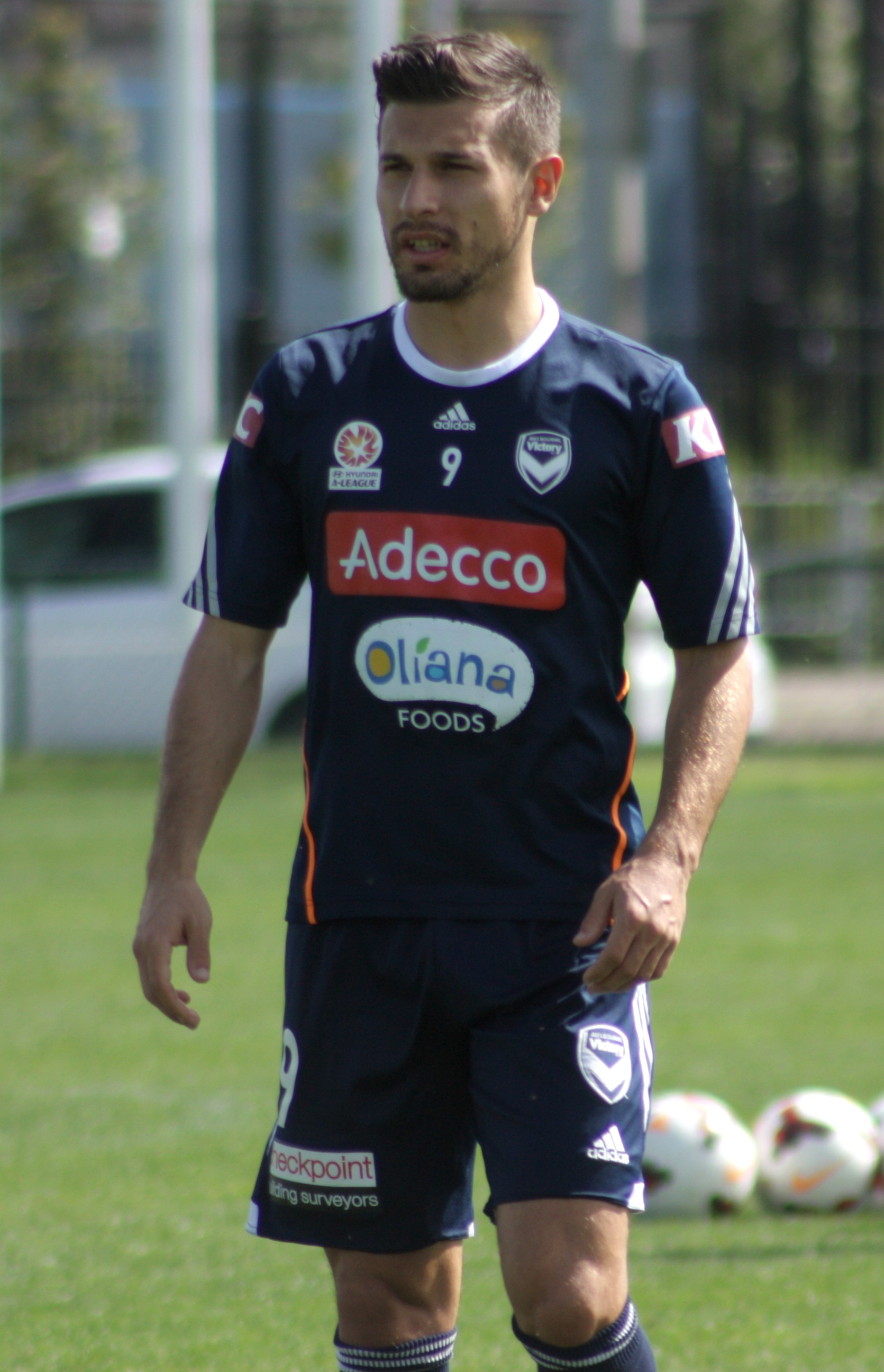
Kosta Barbarouses won the award in 2015 with Melbourne Victory.

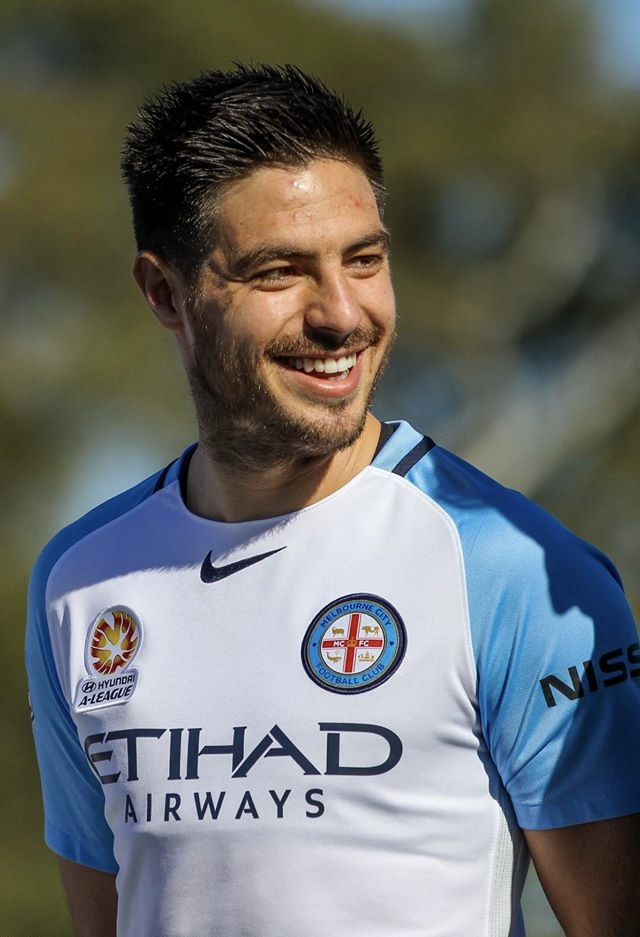
Bruno Fornaroli won the award in 2016 with Melbourne City.

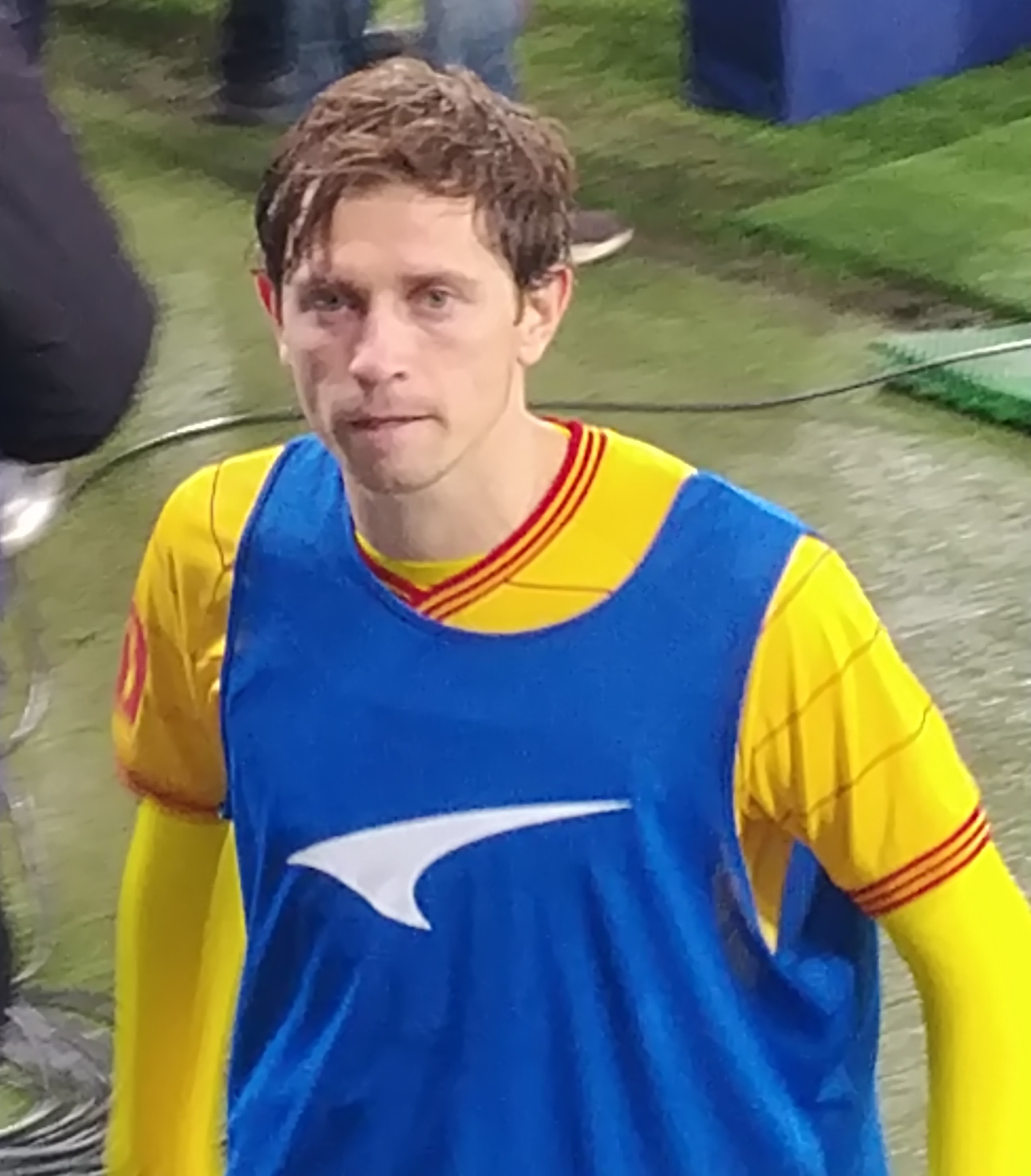
Craig Goodwin won the award in 2018 with Adelaide United.

Mark Viduka Medal winners
Final	Player	Nationality	Position	Team	Opponents	Score	Ref.
2014	Sergio Cirio	Spain	Forward	Adelaide United	Perth Glory	1–0	
2015	Kosta Barbarouses	New Zealand	Midfielder	Melbourne Victory	Perth Glory	2–0	
2016	Bruno Fornaroli	Uruguay (Note: Switched nationality from Uruguay to Australia in 2022)	Forward	Melbourne City	Sydney FC	1–0	
2017	Adrian Mierzejewski	Poland	Midfielder	Sydney FC	Adelaide United	2–1 (a.e.t.)	
2018	Craig Goodwin	Australia	Forward	Adelaide United	Sydney FC	2–1	
2019	Al Hassan Toure	Australia	Forward	Adelaide United	Melbourne City	4–0	
2020	Tournament cancelled due to the COVID-19 pandemic						
2021	Jake Brimmer	Australia	Midfielder	Melbourne Victory	Central Coast Mariners	2–1	
2021	Kye Rowles (Note: player was on the losing team)	Australia	Defender	Central Coast Mariners	Melbourne Victory	2–1	
2022	Ulises Dávila	Mexico	Midfielder	Macarthur FC	Sydney United 58	2–0	
2023	Joe Lolley	England	Midfielder	Sydney FC	Brisbane Roar	3–1	
2024	Filip Kurto	Poland	Goalkeeper	Macarthur FC	Melbourne Victory	1–0	
2025	Max Burgess	Australia	Midfielder	Newcastle Jets	Heidelberg United	3–1 (a.e.t.)	
2026	Javier Díaz López	Spain	Goalkeeper	South Melbourne	Melbourne Victory	1–1 (4–3 (p))	

=== Wins by club ===
Rank	Winner	Total wins	Years won
1	Adelaide United	3	2014, 2018, 2019
2	Melbourne Victory	2	2015, 2021
2	Sydney FC	2	2017, 2023
2	Macarthur FC	2	2022, 2024
5	Melbourne City	1	2016
5	Central Coast Mariners	1	2021
5	Newcastle Jets	1	2025
5	South Melbourne	1	2026

== See also ==
- Joe Marston Medal
- Johnny Warren Medal
- John Kosmina Medal
- Michael Cockerill Medal
