= Diogo Ferreira (soccer, born 1989) =

Australian soccer player

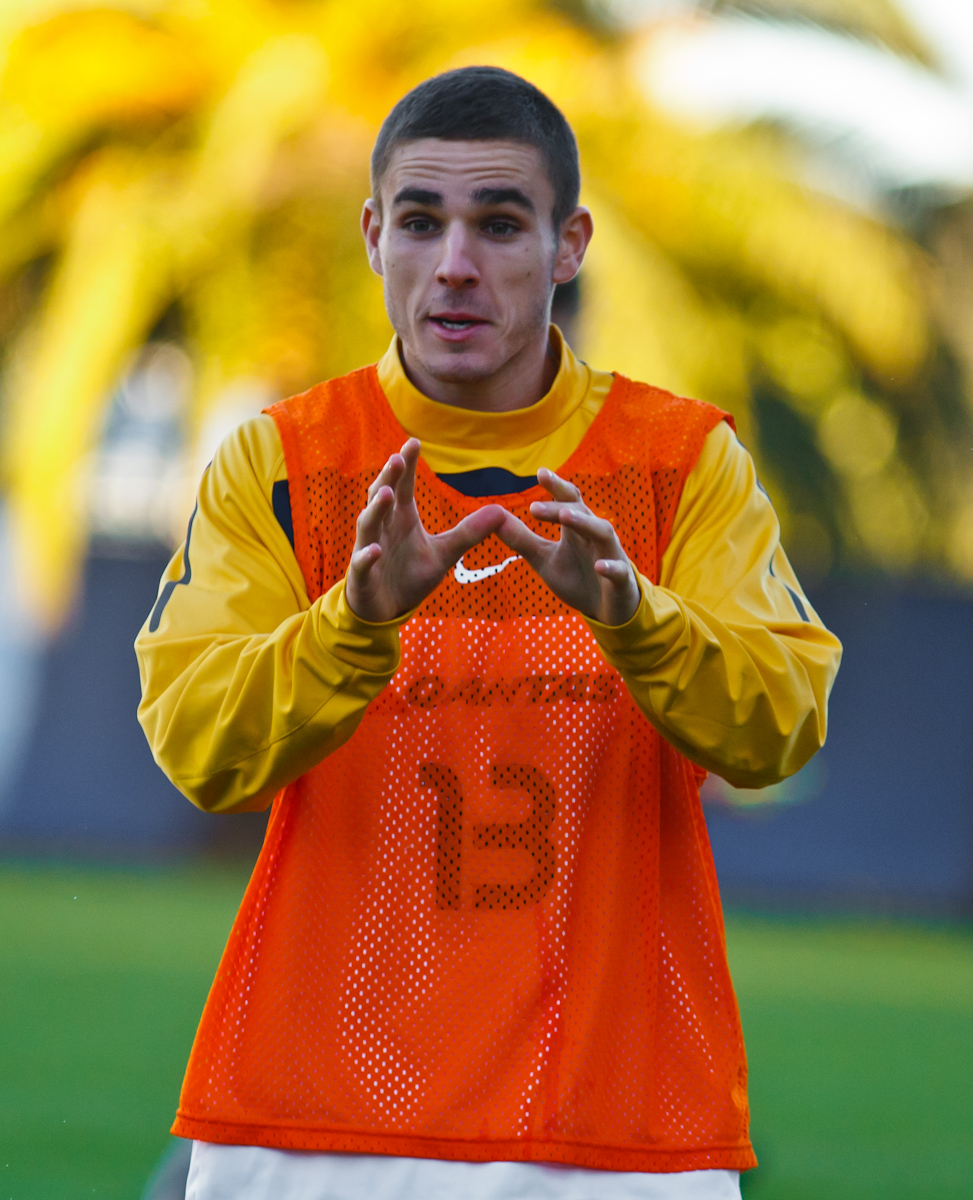
- Ferreira warming up for the Australia U-23 in 2011

Personal information
- Full name: Diogo Alexandre Alves Ferreira
- Date of birth: 5 October 1989 (age 37)
- Place of birth: Footscray, Victoria, Australia
- Height: 1.80 m (5 ft 11 in)
- Position: Defensive midfielder

Youth career
- 1998–2000: Essendon Royals
- 2001–2005: Green Gully
- 2005–2006: FC Porto
- 2006–2008: AD Oeiras
- 2009–2010: Melbourne Victory

Senior career*
Years	Team	Apps	(Gls)
2009	Green Gully	14	(0)
2010–2013	Melbourne Victory	52	(2)
2011	FFV NTC	1	(1)
2013–2014	Brisbane Roar	11	(0)
2014–2016	Perth Glory	21	(0)
2016–2017	Persib Bandung	18	(0)
2017	Penang FA	17	(0)
2017	Mohun Bagan	12	(0)
2018	Tochigi	0	(0)
2019	Dandenong City	5	(0)
2019	Moreland City	18	(0)

International career
2010–2013	Australia U23	17	(2)

Managerial career
- 2021–2022: Melbourne Knights FC (assistant)
- 2022–2023: Western United NPL (assistant)
- 2023–2025: Western United NPL
- 2025–2026: Western United FC (assistant)
- 2026–: Chengdu Rongcheng (assistant)
- * Club domestic league appearances and goals as of 2 June 2019

Diogo Alexandre Alves Ferreira (born 5 October 1989) is an Australian former soccer player who plays as a midfielder.

== Early career ==
At the age of 16, Ferreira completed a successful trial with FC Porto and was signed to the club's youth academy. Whilst in Portugal, he was loaned out to a second division team. At the age of 18, Ferreira thought it was time to return to Australia, and returned to Green Gully, his childhood club. Ferreira was then signed to Melbourne Victory's youth team playing in the National Youth League. He was a key player for two seasons, and was therefore promoted to the club's senior team.

== Club career ==
On 31 March 2010, Ferreira made his senior debut for Melbourne Victory in their 1–0 victory over Kawasaki Frontale in the Asian Champions League.

On 10 May 2010, he was signed to a two-year professional contract with Victory.

On 15 September 2010, Ferreira made his first start for Melbourne Victory against Wellington Phoenix, playing 81 minutes before being substituted for Matthew Foschini.

He scored his first A-League goal on 31 December, playing against Central Coast Mariners. Diogo scored a well placed goal in the 85th minute, in a 2–1 win for Melbourne.

Despite being a regularly used player at Melbourne Victory, Ferreira, along with teammates Tando Velaphi, Spase Dilevski and Sam Gallagher were released by Melbourne Victory in April 2013, shortly after the end of the 2012–13 A-League season. He left the club, having made 52 out of a possible 84 appearances for the club.

Shortly after his release from the Victory, Ferreira went on trial with rival A-League club Brisbane Roar. Less than two months after his release from the Victory, Ferreira was signed by the Roar on a one-year deal, along with former Sydney FC attacking midfielder Dimitri Petratos.

In May 2014, Ferreira signed with Perth Glory.

In August 2016, Ferreira signed a 4-month deal with Indonesia Soccer Championship side Persib Bandung to bolster the squad after Hermawan left the club for personal reasons.

In January 2017, Ferreira signed a one-season deal with Penang FA.

On 9 August 2017, Ferreira switched clubs and countries and signed for Indian club Mohun Bagan and became their fourth foreign signing of the season. He was released on 16 December, with Ferreira claiming "personal issues" for the action.

== International career ==
Ferreira has represented the Australia Olympic football team on seven occasions, scoring one goal. In addition to his Australian citizenship, Ferreira also has Portuguese citizenship and is eligible to play for Portugal.

== Managerial career ==
After his playing career, Ferreira moved into coaching.

In the 2021–22 season, he served as senior assistant coach at Melbourne Knights FC.

He joined Western United FC ahead of the 2022–23 season as assistant coach of the club’s senior NPL team.

In 2023–24, Ferreira was promoted to head coach of Western United’s senior NPL side. During the same period, he also took on the role of second assistant coach with the Western United A-League Men’s team.

For the 2024–25 season, he continued as head coach of Western United’s senior NPL team while maintaining his involvement as a second assistant in the A-League Men’s squad.

Ahead of the 2025–26 season, Ferreira was appointed assistant coach of Western United FC side.

== Personal life ==
Ferreira was born in Footscray, Melbourne. Diogo attended St. Bernard's College in Essendon which was also home to Patrick Kisnorbo. He is of Portuguese descent.

== Honours ==
=== Club ===
Perth Glory

- FFA Cup: Runners up 2015
