= 2018 FFA Cup final =

Final game for 2018 season of Australian knockout soccer competition

Adelaide United	Sydney FC
2	1
- Date: 30 October 2018
- Venue: Coopers Stadium, Adelaide
- Man of the Match: Craig Goodwin
- Referee: Jarred Gillett
- Attendance: 14,448
- Weather: Sunny; 23 °C (73 °F)

The 2018 FFA Cup final was the fifth final of the FFA Cup (now known as the Australia Cup), Australia's main soccer cup competition. The match was contested between Adelaide United and Sydney FC, in a rematch of the 2017 FFA Cup Final which Sydney FC won. Coopers Stadium in Adelaide hosted the game.

The match was broadcast live on Fox Sports.

== Road to the final ==
Adelaide United		Round	Sydney FC	
Opponent	Result		Opponent	Result
Central Coast Mariners	3–0 (H)	Round of 32	Rockdale City Suns	4–2 (A)
Queensland Lions	1–0 (A)	Round of 16	Cairns FC	2–1 (A)
APIA Leichhardt Tigers	2–0 (A)	Quarter-finals	Avondale FC (a.e.t)	4–2 (A)
Bentleigh Greens	2–0 (A)	Semi-finals	Western Sydney Wanderers	3–0 (A)
Note: In all results above, the score of the finalist is given first (H: home; A: away).

Adelaide United's progress started at home against fellow A-League side Central Coast Mariners. In a match held at Marden Sports Complex, they won 3–0 through goals to Jordan Elsey, debutant Mirko Boland and Craig Goodwin. The other three wins to take Adelaide to the Final were over National Premier Leagues teams, and as a result all played away from home under competition rules. Firstly, another Craig Goodwin goal saw Adelaide defeat Queensland Lions 1–0 in Brisbane. This was followed by a 2–0 win over APIA Leichhardt in the quarterfinals in Sydney, with Goodwin and Boland again on the scoresheet. In the semifinals, Adelaide drew the only remaining National Premier Leagues side: Bentleigh Greens. They won 2–0 in Melbourne, with goals to Jordan Elsey and Ben Halloran putting them into the final. The result also meant that Adelaide United were still yet to concede a goal in the 2018 FFA Cup.

Sydney FC commenced their 2018 Cup campaign with three wins over National Premier Leagues sides. They began with a win over fellow Sydney side Rockdale City Suns in the Round of 32. Rockdale City Suns had opened the scoring before four consecutive Sydney FC goals, including two to captain Alex Brosque, secured a 4–2 win. In the round of sixteen, Sydney FC travelled to Queensland to play Cairns FC. Again, they fell behind as the NPL side opened the scoring, but second half goals to Brosque (a penalty) and Trent Buhagiar saw Sydney FC win 2–1. Avondale FC were their quarterfinals, where two goals to Buhagiar in the first half saw the Sky Blues in the lead. However, Avondale FC fought back strongly in the second half, scoring twice to take the game to extra time. Goals to Milos Ninkovic and Adam Le Fondre gave Sydney FC an eventual 4–2 win. In the semifinals, Sydney FC faced their first A-League opposition of the tournament: Western Sydney Wanderers in a Sydney Derby. The game was played at Penrith Stadium. After a scoreless first half, a goal to Buhagiar, a free kick from Siem de Jong and a penalty from Adam Le Fondre saw the Sky Blues move on to the Final.

== Pre-match ==
=== Venue selection ===
This was the first season to see the Final host team decided by random draw, rather than by Football Federation Australia selection. Adelaide were drawn to host the game, with the match to be played at Coopers Stadium, their home ground.

=== Analysis ===
Sydney FC were the reigning Champions coming into the match, having beaten Adelaide 2–1 after extra time in the 2017 FFA Cup Final.

Sydney had also reached the 2016 Final where they had lost to Melbourne City, making this their third consecutive FFA Cup Final Appearance. Sydney would become the first side to win the FFA Cup by winning every game away from home if they were to be victorious. This tournament included the first competitive matches for new Sydney coach Steve Corica, following the departure of Graham Arnold to coach Australia.

Other than the 2017 Final, Adelaide's other previous final appearance was in the 2014 edition, when they defeated Perth Glory 1–0 to win the inaugural FFA Cup.

The two sides played out a 1–1 draw in the opening match of the 2018–19 A-League in Adelaide eleven days prior to the final.

== Match ==
=== Details ===
30 October 2018
19:00 (ACDT)

Adelaide United	2–1	Sydney FC
Goodwin 25', 74'	Report	Le Fondre 28' (pen.)

Coopers Stadium, Adelaide
Attendance: 14,448
Referee: Jarred Gillett

Adelaide United	Sydney FC

GK	20	(Australia) Paul Izzo	(yellow card) 27'
RB	2	(Australia) Michael Marrone	(yellow card) 34'
CB	23	(Australia) Jordan Elsey
CB	22	(Denmark) Michael Jakobsen
LB	3	(Australia) Scott Galloway
CM	8	(Spain) Isaías (c)	(yellow card) 34'
CM	6	(Australia) Vince Lia	(yellow card) 63'	(substituted off) 64'
RW	4	(Australia) Ryan Strain
CAM	31	(Germany) Mirko Boland		(substituted off) 90+5'
LW	11	(Australia) Craig Goodwin		(substituted off) 90+1'
FW	26	(Australia) Ben Halloran
Substitutes:
GK	30	(Australia) Isaac Richards
DF	5	(Australia) Taylor Regan		(substituted on) 90+5'
MF	16	(Australia) Nathan Konstandopoulos
MF	17	(Australia) Nikola Mileusnic		(substituted on) 90+1'
FW	10	(Denmark) Ken Ilsø		(substituted on) 64'
Manager:
(Germany) Marco Kurz

GK	1	(Australia) Andrew Redmayne
RB	23	(Australia) Rhyan Grant
CB	4	(Australia) Alex Wilkinson
CB	5	(Netherlands) Jop van der Linden
LB	7	(Australia) Michael Zullo	(yellow card) 35'
CM	6	(Australia) Joshua Brillante		(substituted off) 81'
CM	13	(Australia) Brandon O'Neill	(yellow card) 52'
RW	8	(Australia) Paulo Retre		(substituted off) 76'
LW	10	(Serbia) Miloš Ninković
ST	9	(England) Adam Le Fondre
ST	14	(Australia) Alex Brosque (c)	(yellow card) 68'
Substitutes:
GK	20	(Australia) Alex Cisak
DF	2	(Australia) Aaron Calver
MF	11	(Australia) Daniel De Silva		(substituted on) 76'
MF	24	(Australia) Cameron Devlin
FW	21	(Australia) Charles Lokolingoy		(substituted on) 81'
Manager:
(Australia) Steve Corica

Man of the Match (Mark Viduka Medal):
(Australia) Craig Goodwin

Assistant referees:
Ryan Gallagher
Daniel Illevski
Fourth official:
Matthew Cream
Additional assistant referees:
Daniel Elder
Ben Abraham

Match rules:

- 90 minutes.
- 30 minutes of extra time if necessary.
- Penalty shoot-out if scores still level.
- Five named substitutes, of which up to three may be used.

=== Statistics ===
Statistics	Adelaide United	Sydney FC
Goals scored	2	1
Total shots	7	8
Ball possession	49%	51%
Corner kicks	10	6
Fouls	15	26
Offsides	3	1
Yellow cards	4	3
Red cards	0	0
