= 2026 Australia Cup final =

- Event: 2026 Australia Cup
South Melbourne	Melbourne Victory
1	1
- After extra time South Melbourne won 4–3 on penalties
- Date: 10 October 2026
- Venue: Melbourne Rectangular Stadium, Melbourne
- Referee: Alireza Faghani
- Attendance: 29,911

The 2026 Australia Cup final was a soccer match on 10 October played between NPL Victoria side South Melbourne and A-League Men side Melbourne Victory to decide the winner of the 2026 Australia Cup. The winner of the final will also qualify for the 2027–28 AFC Champions League Two, provided they meet the AFC’s club licensing requirements. The match's crowd of 29,911 is the highest ever crowd for an Australia Cup final and the highest ever attendance for a sporting match at Melbourne Rectangular Stadium.

South Melbourne won their first Australia Cup title defeating Melbourne Victory 4–3 on penalties after a 1–1 draw after extra time, becoming the first side not from the A-League Men to win the tournament.

== Route to the final ==
South Melbourne		Round	Melbourne Victory	
Opponent	Score		Opponent	Score
Adelaide United	2–1 (H)	Round of 32	Kingborough Lions United FC	4–0 (A)
Fremantle City	3–3 (H)	Round of 16	Western Sydney Wanderers	1–1 (A)
Preston Lions	2–1 (A)	Quarter Finals	APIA Leichhardt FC	1–0 (A)
Lions FC	3–1 (H)	Semi Finals	Sydney FC	2–0 (A)
Note: In all results above, the score of the finalist is given first (H: home; A: away).

=== Details ===
10 October 2026
19:50 AEDT

South Melbourne	1–1 (a.e.t.)	Melbourne Victory
Mikkola 117'	Report	Genreau 95'
Penalties
Jankovic (penalty scored); Swibel (penalty scored); Lackay (penalty scored); Mesourouni (penalty scored)	4–3	(penalty scored) May; (penalty missed) Sawyer; (penalty scored) Ghossaini; (penalty scored) Genreau; (penalty missed) Davidson

Melbourne Rectangular Stadium, Melbourne
Attendance: 29,911
Referee: Alireza Faghani

South Melbourne	Melbourne Victory

GK	1	(Spain) Javier Lopez
RB	27	(Australia) Jack Painter-Andrews		(substituted off) 105'
CB	23	(Australia) Jacob Eliopoulos		(substituted off) 46'
CB	4	(Australia) Marco Janković (c)
LB	3	(Australia) Jordan Lampard
CM	21	(Australia) Sebastian Pasquali		(substituted off) 110'
CM	17	(Australia) Thomas Giannakopoulos	(yellow card) 4'	(substituted off) 83'
CM	7	(New Zealand) David Yoo	(yellow card) 42'	(substituted off) 90'
RW	11	(Japan) Yuki Uchida
CF	10	(South Sudan) Bul Juach
LW	16	(South Africa) Arran Cocks		(substituted off) 76'
Substitutes:
GK	20	(Australia) Jake Charlston
DF	5	(Australia) Hassan Ramazani		(substituted on) 83'
MF	8	(Australia) Paulo Retre		(substituted on) 46'
MF	19	(Australia) Andrew Mesourouni		(substituted on) 90'
FW	9	(Australia) Jordan Swibel		(substituted on) 110'
FW	13	(Australia) James Lackay		(substituted on) 105'
FW	22	(Australia) Max Mikkola		(substituted on) 76'
Head Coach:
(Australia) Siniša Cohadzić

GK	25	(Australia) Jack Duncan
RB	16	(Australia) Joshua Inserra	(yellow card) 87'
CB	15	(Wales) Tom Lockyer
CB	3	(Australia) Jason Davidson (c)	(yellow card) 71'
LB	18	(Australia) Franco Lino		(substituted off) 105'
CM	8	(Australia) Jordi Valadon
CM	22	(Australia) Xavier Stella		(substituted off) 76'
AM	14	(Australia) Matthew Grimaldi		(substituted off) 57'
RW	23	(Australia) Keegan Jelacic		(substituted off) 57'
CF	44	(Japan) Charles Nduka		(substituted off) 90'
LW	11	(Brazil) Clarismario Santos		(substituted off) 105'
Substitutes:
GK	1	(Australia) Jack Warshawsky
DF	10	(Australia) Harry Shillington		(substituted on) 105'
DF	13	(Germany) Philipp Ziereis		(substituted on) 105'
MF	10	(Australia) Denis Genreau	(yellow card) 71'	(substituted on) 102'
FW	9	(Australia) Harrison Sawyer		(substituted on) 76'
FW	21	(Uruguay) Guillermo May		(substituted on) 57'
FW	29	(Australia) Mikey Ghossaini		(substituted on) 90'
Head Coach:
(Venezuela) Giovanni Savarese

Man of the Match:
Javier Lopez (South Melbourne)
Assistant referees:
Luke Gennimatas
Claire Green
Fourth official:
Caitlin Williams

Match rules

- 90 minutes
- 30 minutes of extra time if necessary
- Penalty shoot-out if scores still level
- Maximum of seven named substitutes
- Maximum of five substitutions, with a sixth allowed in extra time
- Maximum of three substitution opportunities, with a fourth allowed in extra time
