= 2019 FFA Cup final =

Final game for 2019 season of Australian knockout soccer competition

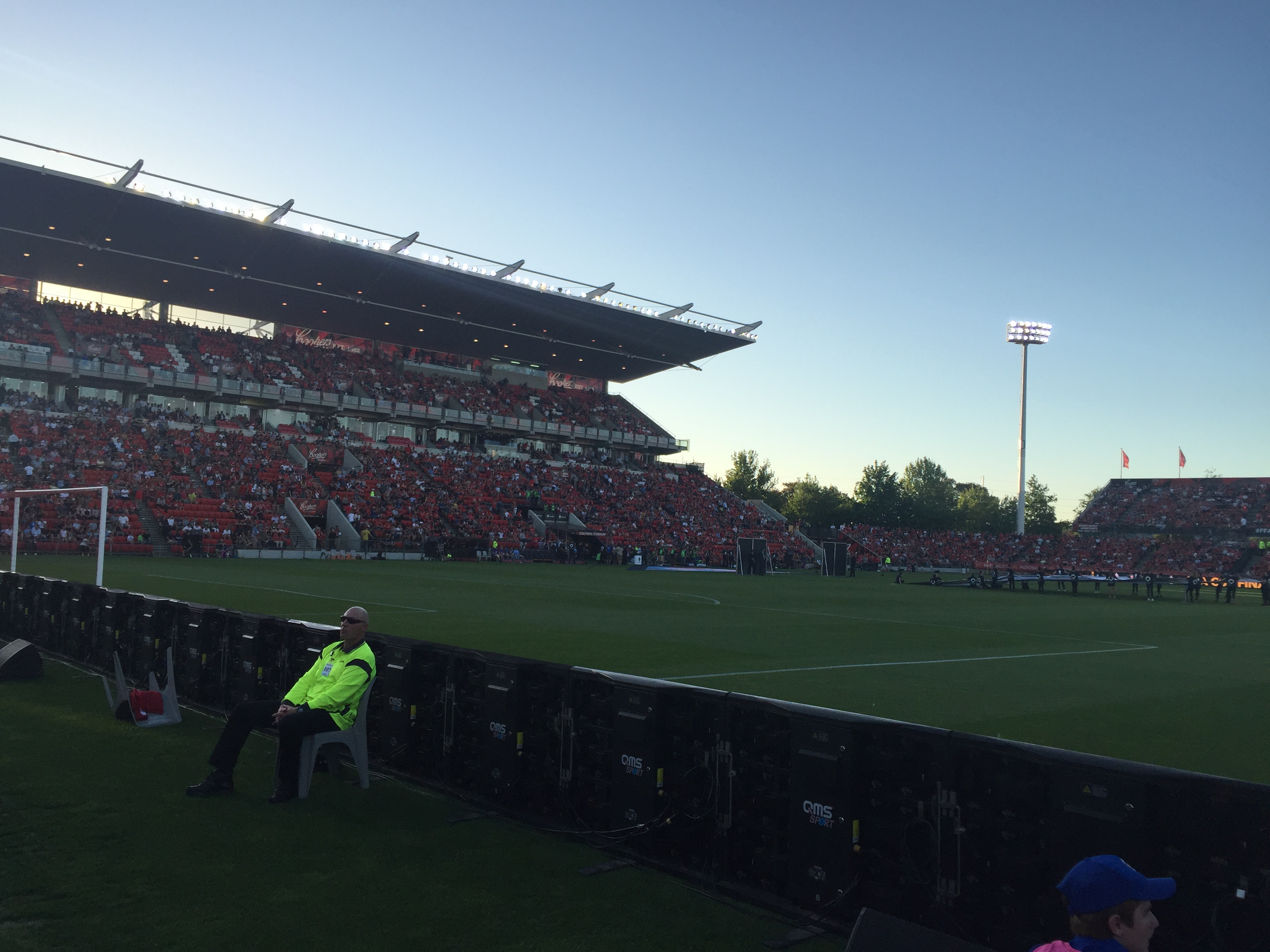
Adelaide United	Melbourne City
4	0
- Date: 23 October 2019
- Venue: Coopers Stadium, Adelaide
- Man of the Match: Al Hassan Toure
- Referee: Alex King
- Attendance: 14,920
- Weather: Sunny; 30 °C (86 °F)

The 2019 FFA Cup final was the sixth final of the FFA Cup (now known as the Australia Cup), Australia's main soccer cup competition and the final match of the 2019 FFA Cup. The match was contested between Adelaide United and Melbourne City, and was held at Coopers Stadium, home of Adelaide United. Hosts Adelaide United defeated Melbourne City by four goals to nil, recording their third FFA Cup title and second in succession.

The match was broadcast live on Fox Sports.

== Road to the final ==
Adelaide United		Round	Melbourne City	
Opponent	Result		Opponent	Result
Melbourne Knights	5–2 (A)	Round of 32	Campbelltown City	3–1 (A)
Olympic FC	3–2 (A)	Round of 16	Marconi Stallions	2–1 (A)
Newcastle Jets	1–0 (H)	Quarter-finals	Western Sydney Wanderers	3–0 (H)
Central Coast Mariners	2–1 (A)	Semi-finals	Brisbane Strikers	5–1 (A)
Note: In all results above, the score of the finalist is given first (H: home; A: away).

Adelaide United entered the tournament as the reigning champions, having defeated Sydney FC 2–1 in the 2018 Cup Final at home. The Reds were drawn away to high-profile NPL VIC club Melbourne Knights and won 5–2, with Ben Halloran's two goals in that match helping to keep the Knights at bay. In the Round of 16, Adelaide travelled to Brisbane to take on Olympic FC and were in danger of becoming the second A-League club to lose to an NPL club in this year's tournament. Olympic FC drew level with Adelaide twice in the match, before George Blackwood's 84th minute penalty conversion got the Reds over the line. United then met A-League clubs for the remainder of the cup, winning 1–0 against Newcastle Jets at home in the quarter-final. A come-from-behind semi-final victory over the Central Coast Mariners was sealed by to a controversial 90th minute goal scored by ex-City footballer Riley McGree. Adelaide United became the first A-League club to qualify for their fourth FFA Cup Final.

Melbourne City's opponent in the round of 32, was NPL SA club Campbelltown City in Adelaide. Goals from Jamie Maclaren and Craig Noone saw Melbourne City victorious by a margin of 3–1. In the round of 16, Melbourne City headed over to Sydney to take NPL NSW club Marconi Stallions. After Jamie Maclaren scored the opening goal in the second minute, Craig Noone would score Melbourne City's second off a flick from Connor Metcalfe to give Melbourne City a 2–0 lead. A late consolation goal wasn't enough for the Stallions, with the final scoreline reading 2–1. The club met Western Sydney Wanderers in the quarter-finals for the second time in three years and were dominant in a 3–0 win. In their semi-final tie, City traveled to take on the Brisbane Strikers at Perry Park. Despite conceding the first goal inside the opening five minutes, City won the match 5–1. Striker Jamie Maclaren scored in each match, and entered the final with six goals to his name.

== Pre-match ==
=== Venue ===
For the second consecutive year, the host venue was randomly drawn following the conclusion of the semi-finals. Adelaide's home ground of Coopers Stadium was drawn, making it the third time the venue had hosted the showpiece event and for the second consecutive year.

=== Analysis ===
Adelaide entered the match as the reigning cup champions and made their fourth appearance in the event. Success would provide the club with their third title, having won the cup in 2014 and 2018. City meanwhile have reached the final once before, in 2016 when they defeated Sydney FC at home to claim the senior men's team first piece of silverware.

The two teams met three days prior in Round 2 of the A-League where City came out on top 2–1 with Jamie Maclaren scoring a brace and Riley McGree scoring Adelaide's only goal.

== Match ==
=== Details ===
23 October 2019
19:00 ACDT

Adelaide United	4–0	Melbourne City
Toure 25'; Halloran 49'; Mileusnic 60'; McGree 75'	Report

Coopers Stadium, Adelaide
Attendance: 14,920
Referee: Alex King

Adelaide United	Melbourne City

GK	20	(Australia) Paul Izzo
RB	4	(Australia) Ryan Strain	(yellow card) 82'
CB	2	(Australia) Michael Marrone
CB	22	(Denmark) Michael Jakobsen (c)
LB	7	(Australia) Ryan Kitto	(yellow card) 45+1'
DM	27	(Australia) Louis D'Arrigo
DM	5	(Curaçao) Michaël Maria
RM	26	(Australia) Ben Halloran	(yellow card) 90+1'
CM	8	(Australia) Riley McGree	(yellow card) 79'	(substituted off) 85'
LM	17	(Australia) Nikola Mileusnic		(substituted off) 90'
CF	35	(Australia) Al Hassan Toure		(substituted off) 72'
Substitutes:
GK	30	(Australia) Isaac Richards
MF	18	(Australia) Lachlan Brook		(substituted on) 90'
MF	16	(Australia) Nathan Konstandopoulos		(substituted on) 85'
MF	6	(Australia) Vince Lia
FW	11	(Norway) Kristian Opseth		(substituted on) 72'
Manager:
(Netherlands) Gertjan Verbeek

GK	23	(Australia) Dean Bouzanis
RB	2	(Australia) Scott Galloway		(substituted off) 55'
CB	4	(Australia) Harrison Delbridge
CB	22	(Australia) Curtis Good
LB	3	(Australia) Scott Jamieson (c)	(yellow card) 79'
CM	34	(Australia) Connor Metcalfe		(substituted off) 66'
CM	6	(Australia) Joshua Brillante
CM	20	(Uruguay) Adrián Luna
RW	19	(Australia) Lachlan Wales
CF	29	(Australia) Jamie Maclaren
LW	11	(England) Craig Noone		(substituted off) 72'
Substitutes:
GK	1	(Australia) Tom Glover
DF	40	(Austria) Richard Windbichler		(substituted on) 55'
MF	17	(Australia) Denis Genreau	(yellow card) 81'	(substituted on) 66'
MF	7	(Australia) Rostyn Griffiths
FW	21	(Australia) Ramy Najjarine		(substituted on) 72'
Manager:
(France) Erick Mombaerts

Man of the Match (Mark Viduka Medal):
Al Hassan Toure

Assistant referees:
Matthew Cream
Wilson Brown
Fourth official:
Josh Mannella
Additional assistant referees:
Shaun Evans
Adam Kersey

Match rules:

- 90 minutes.
- 30 minutes of extra time if necessary.
- Penalty shoot-out if scores still level.
- Five named substitutes, of which up to three may be used.

=== Statistics ===
Statistics	Adelaide United	Melbourne City
Goals scored	4	0
Total shots	11	13
Ball possession	34%	66%
Corner kicks	2	7
Fouls	13	8
Offsides	1	2
Yellow cards	4	2
Red cards	0	0
