= 2020 FFA Cup =

2020 season of Australia's national knockout soccer competition

Tournament details
- Country: Australia; New Zealand
- Teams: 765, though only 635 played or were drawn to play

The 2020 FFA Cup was a planned season of the FFA Cup (now known as the Australia Cup), the main national soccer knockout cup competition in Australia. Some preliminary matches were held in February and March, prior to the competition being suspended in mid-March due to the COVID-19 pandemic in Australia. The competition was cancelled on 3 July.

== Teams ==
A total of 32 teams were originally scheduled to participate in the 2020 FFA Cup competition proper, ten of which are from the A-League, one the 2019 National Premier Leagues Champion (Wollongong Wolves), and the remaining 21 teams from FFA member federations, as determined by the qualifying rounds.

== Preliminary rounds ==
FFA member federations teams started to compete in various state-based preliminary rounds to win one of 21 places in the competition proper (round of 32). With the exception of youth teams affiliated directly with A-League clubs, all Australian clubs were eligible to enter the qualifying process through their respective FFA member federation, subject to only one team per club being permitted entry.
