= 2017 FFA Cup final =

Final game for 2017 season of Australian knockout soccer competition

Sydney FC	Adelaide United
2	1
- Date: 21 November 2017
- Venue: Allianz Stadium, Sydney
- Man of the Match: Adrian Mierzejewski
- Referee: Kris Griffiths-Jones
- Attendance: 13,452
- Weather: Partly cloudy 24 °C (75 °F)

The 2017 FFA Cup final was the fourth final of the FFA Cup (now known as the Australia Cup), the premier soccer knockout cup competition in Australia. The match was held at Allianz Stadium, as determined by Football Federation Australia (FFA), making it the first FFA Cup Final hosted in Sydney. Melbourne City were the defending champions, however they were defeated 2–0 by Sydney FC in the quarter-finals. Sydney FC went on to defeat South Melbourne in the semi-finals to make their second FFA Cup Final appearance. Adelaide United defeated Western Sydney Wanderers 2–1 in the semi-finals to also make their second FFA Cup Final appearance.

== Road to the final ==
Sydney FC		Round	Adelaide United	
Opponent	Result		Opponent	Result
Darwin Rovers	8–0 (A)	Round of 32	Newcastle Jets	1–0 (H)
Bankstown Berries	3–0 (A)	Round of 16	Melbourne Victory	3–0 (H)
Melbourne City	2–0 (H)	Quarter-finals	Heidelberg United	3–0 (A)
South Melbourne	5–1 (A)	Semi-finals	Western Sydney Wanderers	2–1 (A)
Note: In all results above, the score of the finalist is given first (H: home; A: away).

Sydney FC and Adelaide United were among 735 teams who entered the FFA Cup competition, and as A-League clubs, both entered the tournament in the Round of 32.

Sydney FC's first match was away against Darwin Rovers, whom they trounced 8–0. In the Round of 16, Sydney FC defeated fellow Sydney club Bankstown Berries 3–0. In their quarter final, they defeated fellow A-League club and reigning champions Melbourne City 2–0 at Leichhardt Oval. Their semi-final opponents, South Melbourne were comprehensively beaten 5–1.

Adelaide United's FFA Cup journey began with a 1–0 win over the Newcastle Jets at Marden Sports Complex. They then defeated rivals Melbourne Victory 3–0 at home. United's quarter final match-up saw them easily account for Heidelberg United 3–0 away at Olympic Village, Melbourne. In the semi-finals, United took on the Western Sydney Wanderers at Campbelltown Stadium and came out 2–1 victors in front of over 5,000 spectators.

== Match ==
=== Details ===
21 November 2017
19:30 AEDT

Sydney FC	2–1 (a.e.t.)	Adelaide United
Ninković 19'; Bobô 111'	Report	Mileusnic 67'

Allianz Stadium, Sydney
Attendance: 13,452
Referee: Kris Griffiths-Jones

Sydney FC	Adelaide United

GK	1	(Australia) Andrew Redmayne
RB	26	(Australia) Luke Wilkshire	(yellow card) 43'	(substituted off) 106'
CB	5	(Netherlands) Jordy Buijs
CB	2	(Australia) Alex Wilkinson
LB	7	(Australia) Michael Zullo
CM	6	(Australia) Joshua Brillante
CM	13	(Australia) Brandon O'Neill
RW	11	(Poland) Adrian Mierzejewski	(yellow card) 120+3'
CAM	14	(Australia) Alex Brosque (c)	(yellow card) 23'	(substituted off) 71'
LW	10	(Serbia) Miloš Ninković		(substituted off) 62'
FW	9	(Brazil) Bobô
Substitutes:
GK	30	(Australia) Tom Heward-Belle
DF	22	(Australia) Sebastian Ryall		(substituted on) 106'
MF	16	(Australia) Anthony Kalik
MF	17	(Australia) David Carney	(yellow card) 117'	(substituted on) 62'
FW	18	(Australia) Matt Simon		(substituted on) 71'
Manager:
(Australia) Graham Arnold

GK	20	(Australia) Paul Izzo
RB	2	(Australia) Michael Marrone	(red card) 115'
CB	23	(Australia) Jordan Elsey	(yellow card) 119'
CB	22	(Turkey) Ersan Gülüm	(yellow card) 109'	(substituted off) 78'
LB	19	(Australia) Ben Garuccio
CM	8	(Spain) Isaías (c)
CM	37	(Germany) Daniel Adlung	(yellow card) 83'
RW	17	(Australia) Nikola Mileusnic
CAM	10	(Algeria) Karim Matmour
RM	7	(Australia) Ryan Kitto		(substituted off) 88'
ST	9	(Senegal) Baba Diawara		(substituted off) 73'
Substitutes:
GK	1	(Australia) Daniel Margush
DF	4	(Australia) Ben Warland		(substituted on) 78'
MF	12	(Australia) Mark Ochieng	(yellow card) 104'	(substituted on) 88'
MF	16	(Australia) Nathan Konstandopoulos
FW	14	(Australia) George Blackwood		(substituted on) 73'
Manager:
(Germany) Marco Kurz

Man of the Match (Mark Viduka Medal):
(Poland) Adrian Mierzejewski

Assistant referees:
Owen Goldrick
Lance Greenshields
Fourth official:
David Walsh
Additional assistant referees:
Chris Beath
Stephen Lucas

Match rules:

- 90 minutes.
- 30 minutes of extra time if necessary.
- Penalty shoot-out if scores still level.
- Five named substitutes, of which up to three may be used.

=== Statistics ===
Statistics	Sydney FC	Adelaide United
Goals scored	2	1
Total shots	18	9
Shots on target	9	4
Ball possession	53%	47%
Corner kicks	5	3
Fouls	25	20
Offsides	0	4
Yellow cards	4	4
Red cards	0	1

== See also ==
- 2017 FFA Cup
