= 2014 FFA Cup final =

Final game for 2014 season of Australian knockout soccer competition

Adelaide United	Perth Glory
1	0
- Date: 16 December 2014
- Venue: Coopers Stadium, Adelaide
- Man of the Match: Sergio Cirio
- Referee: Chris Beath
- Attendance: 16,142
- Weather: Partly cloudy 19 °C (66 °F)

The 2014 FFA Cup final was the inaugural final of the FFA Cup (now known as the Australia Cup), the premier soccer knockout cup competition in Australia. The match was an all A-League affair, contested between Adelaide United and Perth Glory at Coopers Stadium on 16 December 2014. Although future editions of the tournament will involve the Cup final being played late in the Australian summer, this season's final was brought forward in order to avoid a clash with the 2015 AFC Asian Cup, which was hosted by Australia. Adelaide United were the inaugural champions, winning 1–0 with Sergio Cirio scoring the lone goal of the match shortly after Joshua Risdon was sent off for a second bookable offence, reducing Perth to 10 men.

The 2014 FFA Cup final is the only FFA Cup/Australia Cup final to date to have been played in December.

== Venue ==
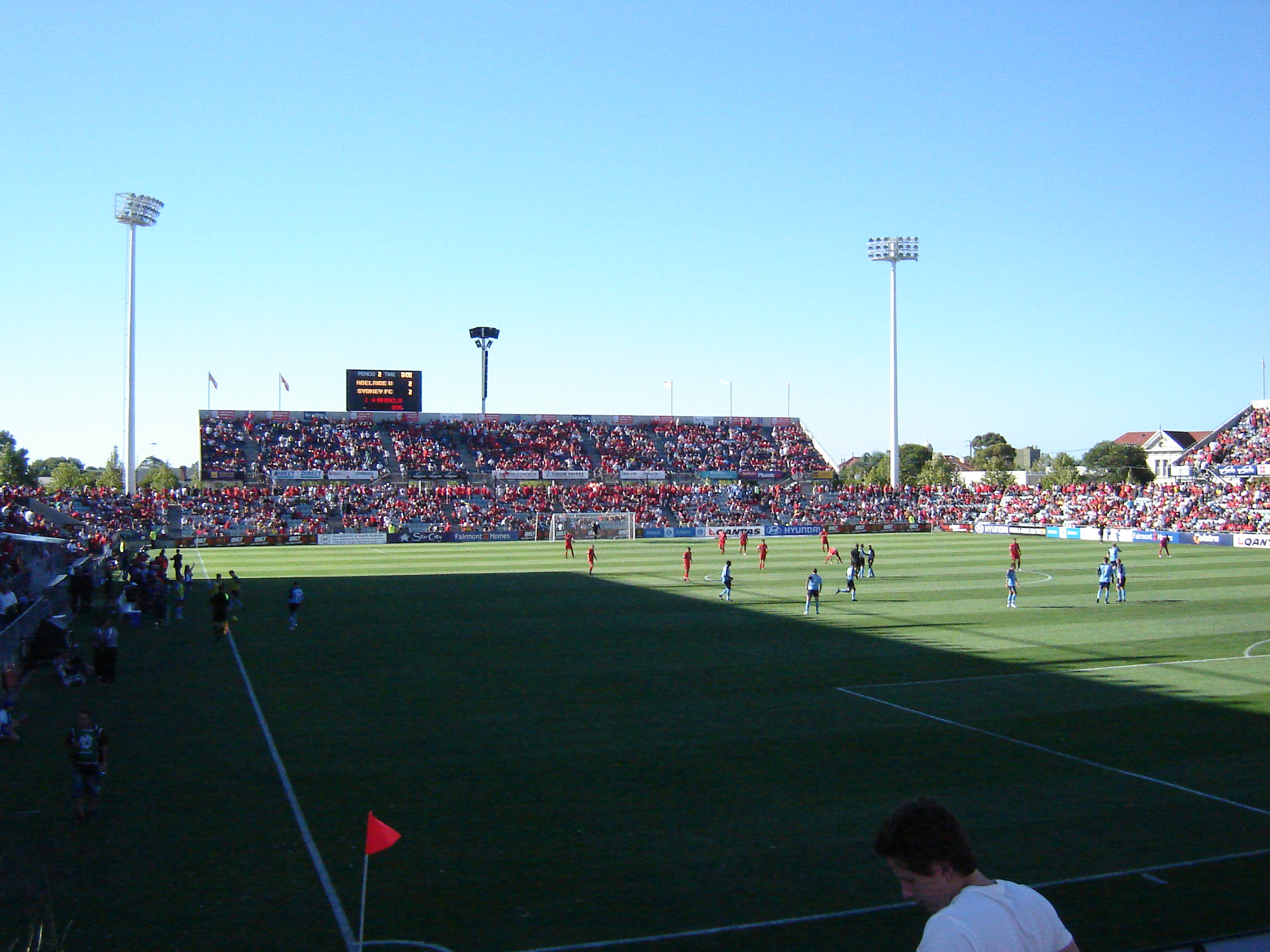
Coopers Stadium in Adelaide hosted the inaugural FFA Cup Final

On 12 November 2014, Coopers Stadium (home of Adelaide United), was announced as the venue of the 2014 final by Football Federation Australia following the completion of the season's cup semi-final matches. The venue was chosen in preference to Perth Glory's home ground of nib Stadium. Discussing the choice of venue Perth Glory Chief Executive Jason Brewer commented "It wasn't going to be played in Perth for any number of reasons at the FFA's discretions", adding "I think Western Australian and Perth football fans have been fairly hard done by".

The home ground of Adelaide United since 2003, the stadium holds a capacity crowd of 17,000 which makes it the smallest capacity of any full-time A-League venue. It was first opened in 1960 and it hosted its first National Soccer League match on 11 April 1977. The venue has formerly been home to both Adelaide City and West Adelaide and in 2000, the ground underwent a full redevelopment at the cost of $27 million in order to host matches of the 2000 Olympic football tournament.

Hindmarsh Stadium has also held other events, including the National Soccer League Grand Finals of 1986 and 1995, the NSL Cup finals of 1986, 1989 and 1992, the final of the 1987 OFC Club Championship and the second leg of the 2008 AFC Champions League Final. Additionally, the stadium has hosted various 2004 OFC Nations Cup, 2006 AFC Women's Asian Cup and FIFA World Cup qualifying matches. During their tenure in the NRL, the Adelaide Rams briefly used Hindmarsh Stadium as their home for their final four matches of the 1998 season. The stadium's record attendance of 18,430 was set during the 2000 Olympic Games when temporary stands were in place to bring the capacity up to 20,000.

== Road to the final ==
Adelaide United		Round	Perth Glory	
Opponent	Result		Opponent	Result
Wellington Phoenix	1–0 (H)	Round of 32	Newcastle Jets	2–0 (A)
Brisbane Roar	2–0 (H)	Round of 16	St Albans Saints	4–1 (A)
Sydney FC (a.e.t.)	3–1 (A)	Quarter-finals	Melbourne Victory	4–2 (H)
Central Coast Mariners	3–2 (H)	Semi-finals	Bentleigh Greens	3–0 (A)
Note: In all results above, the score of the finalist is given first (H: home; A: away).

Adelaide United and Perth Glory were among 631 teams who entered the inaugural FFA Cup competition, and as A-League clubs, both entered the tournament in the Round of 32.

Adelaide United's first match was at home against Wellington Phoenix. A single goal by Sergio Cirio in the 31st minute was enough to see the game end in favor of the home team. United progressed to a Round of 16 home match against Brisbane Roar, where goals by Cirio and Bruce Djite within the first half left the score 2–0. In the quarter-final stage, Adelaide United were drawn away to Sydney FC. Goals scored by Cirio and Sydney FC captain Alex Brosque took the match into extra time, where Djite found the net on twice to end the game 1–3. In the semi-finals, United took on Central Coast Mariners at home. A brace from Cirio either side of a goal from Awer Mabil saw the match end 3–2, with Adelaide progressing to the first ever FFA Cup Final.

Perth Glory's cup run started with an away tie against fellow A-League side Newcastle Jets. Goals from Irish import Andy Keogh either side of half time gave Perth Glory a 0–2 win. In the Round of 16, Glory were drawn against St Albans Saints of National Premier Leagues Victoria, away from home. Goals from Jamie Maclaren and Keogh complimented a double from Nebojša Marinković to give the Glory a 1–4 win. For the quarter-finals, Perth was drawn against Melbourne Victory at home. Ben Khalfallah gave Melbourne Victory an early lead, though Glory were quick to respond with Keogh leveling the score within the first 15 minutes; although a late penalty by Keogh was not enough for the home side to secure the match, with Gui Finkler leveling the scores in the 92nd minute. Goals by Daniel De Silva and Marinković during extra time finished the match 4–2 in favor of the home team. For the semi-finals, Glory faced another National Premier Leagues Victoria side away from home, in the form of Bentleigh Greens. A 0–3 result with goals from Marinković and Chris Harold sent Perth Glory into the final.

== Pre-match ==
Although the final was held at a small-sized venue, interest in tickets exceeded expectation, with tickets selling out within three days of going on sale to the public. Ticket prices varied from $30 for general admission to $40 for reserved seating.

Chris Beath was named as the referee of the final, together with George Lakrindis and Anton Shchetinin as the assistant referees, Jonathan Barreiro as the fourth official and Kris Griffiths-Jones and Shaun Evans as additional assistant referees. In the 2014 FFA Cup, Beath took charge of the semi-final match between Adelaide United–Central Coast Mariners. He had previously taken charge of a number of A-League, AFC Cup and AFC Champions League matches, international friendlies, as well as named as one of the referees in the 2014 AFC Challenge Cup and 2014 AFC U-19 Championship.

Going into the final, Osama Malik was left out of Adelaide United's squad due to injury. Craig Goodwin was also left out due to being contracted to Newcastle Jets for the remainder of the cup season. Perth Glory were also missing three players due to injury: Youssouf Hersi, Diogo Ferreira and Mitch Nichols.

== Match ==
=== Summary ===
Awer Mabil had the first chance of the match. The Adelaide United forward could have opened the scoring inside the opening five minutes but he failed to latch on to Sergio Cirio's square pass through the penalty area. As the match progressed, Adelaide playmaker Marcelo Carrusca was next to test Perth Glory keeper Danny Vukovic, stinging the keeper's fingers from long range. Perth's shouts for a penalty on the 25th minutes were waved away by the referee, when Adelaide's keeper Eugene Galekovic and Richard Garcia tangled just outside the area but replays showed Galekovic won the ball. The visiting team racked up the fouls with Garcia and Joshua Risdon earning bookings on the 32nd and 42nd minutes respectively before Mabil squandered an opportunity to break the deadlock in first half injury time. After Carrusca won back possession on halfway, he released Bruce Djite who in turn teed up Mabil who blasted high and wide from eight metres with just the keeper to beat.

Adelaide continued to dominate proceedings in the second half and Mabil wasted another chance just after the break, blazing over the bar once again after some neat build up play from Cirio. The hosts took full advantage when Risdon's tug on Carrusca's shorts saw him earn a second yellow card just before the hour mark and the deadlock was broken not 10 minutes later. Carrusca slipped Cirio through from the edge of the area, and the player rounded Vukovic and slotted his shot from a tight angle. Perth had Vukovic to thank for keeping the score at 1–0 when he tipped over a 30-metre shot from Isaías with five minutes remaining. Late into the match, Adelaide were content to maintain possession and saw out the final few minutes without any incident, ensuring they held on for the win.

=== Details ===
16 December 2014
19:00 ACDT

Adelaide United	1–0	Perth Glory
Cirio 67'	Report

Coopers Stadium, Adelaide
Attendance: 16,142
Referee: Chris Beath

Adelaide United	Perth Glory

GK	1	(Australia) Eugene Galekovic (c)
RB	2	(Australia) Michael Marrone
CB	4	(Australia) Dylan McGowan
CB	3	(Australia) Nigel Boogaard
LB	21	(Australia) Tarek Elrich
RM	18	(Australia) James Jeggo
CM	8	(Spain) Isaías	(yellow card) 69'
LM	10	(Argentina) Marcelo Carrusca		(substituted off) 80'
RF	17	(Australia) Awer Mabil		(substituted off) 59'
CF	11	(Australia) Bruce Djite		(substituted off) 86'
LF	9	(Spain) Sergio Cirio
Substitutes:
GK	30	(Australia) John Hall
MF	14	(Australia) Cameron Watson		(substituted on) 86'
MF	22	(Portugal) Fábio Ferreira		(substituted on) 59'
MF	24	(Australia) Bruce Kamau
FW	7	(Spain) Pablo Sánchez		(substituted on) 80'
Manager:
(Spain) Josep Gombau

GK	1	(Australia) Danny Vukovic
RB	19	(Australia) Joshua Risdon	(yellow card) 42' (yellow-red card) 58'
CB	6	(Australia) Dino Djulbic
CB	23	(Australia) Michael Thwaite (c)
LB	21	(Australia) Scott Jamieson
CM	8	(Australia) Ruben Zadkovich
CM	5	(Australia) Rostyn Griffiths
AM	10	(Serbia) Nebojša Marinković		(substituted off) 79'
RF	11	(Australia) Richard Garcia	(yellow card) 32'
CF	9	(Republic of Ireland) Andy Keogh
LF	20	(Australia) Daniel De Silva		(substituted off) 45'
Substitutes:
GK	18	(Australia) Jack Duncan
DF	3	(Australia) Brandon O'Neill
FW	14	(Australia) Chris Harold
FW	15	(Australia) Jamie Maclaren		(substituted on) 79'
FW	16	(Brazil) Sidnei Sciola		(substituted on) 45'
Manager:
(England) Kenny Lowe

Man of the Match (Mark Viduka Medal):
Sergio Cirio

Assistant referees:
George Lakrindis
Anton Shchetinin
Fourth official:
Jonathan Barreiro
Additional assistant referees:
Kris Griffiths-Jones
Shaun Evans

Match rules:

- 90 minutes.
- 30 minutes of extra time if necessary.
- Penalty shoot-out if scores still level.
- Five named substitutes, of which up to three may be used.

=== Statistics ===
Statistics	Adelaide United	Perth Glory
Goals scored	1	0
Total shots	14	4
Shots on target	4	0
Ball possession	66%	34%
Corner kicks	6	2
Fouls	10	21
Offsides	1	1
Yellow cards	1	1
Red cards	0	1

== Post match ==
After scoring the match winning goal, Sergio Cirio was named man of the match, awarded the Mark Viduka Medal by the former Australian captain, for his efforts.

Adelaide United captain Eugene Galekovic commented on the match, saying "We knew it wasn't going to be a walk in the park today and credit to them (Perth Glory), they fought with 10 men. In the end we probably had the better chances and I think we deserved it today."

The match was broadcast live in Australia by Fox Sports. A peak audience of 104,000 viewers watched the final, which was the highest viewership of any cup match broadcast in the tournament that season.

== See also ==
- 2014 FFA Cup
