= 2015 FFA Cup final =

Final game for 2015 season of Australian knockout soccer competition

Melbourne Victory	Perth Glory
2	0
- Date: 7 November 2015
- Venue: AAMI Park, Melbourne
- Man of the Match: Kosta Barbarouses
- Referee: Ben Williams
- Attendance: 15,098
- Weather: Partly cloudy 17 °C (63 °F)

The 2015 FFA Cup final was the second final of the FFA Cup (now known as the Australia Cup), the premier soccer knockout cup competition in Australia. The match was held on 7 November 2015 at AAMI Park. The final was held on a Saturday night for the first time. Adelaide United were the defending champions, though they were knocked out of the competition at the Quarter-Final stage by rivals Melbourne Victory.

Perth Glory qualified for the FFA Cup Final on 21 October 2015, with a 3–1 victory over Melbourne City at Nib Stadium. Melbourne Victory qualified for the FFA Cup Final on 28 October 2015, with a 3–0 victory over Hume City at AAMI Park.

Melbourne Victory won the match 2–0, with goals from Oliver Bozanic and Besart Berisha.

== Venue ==
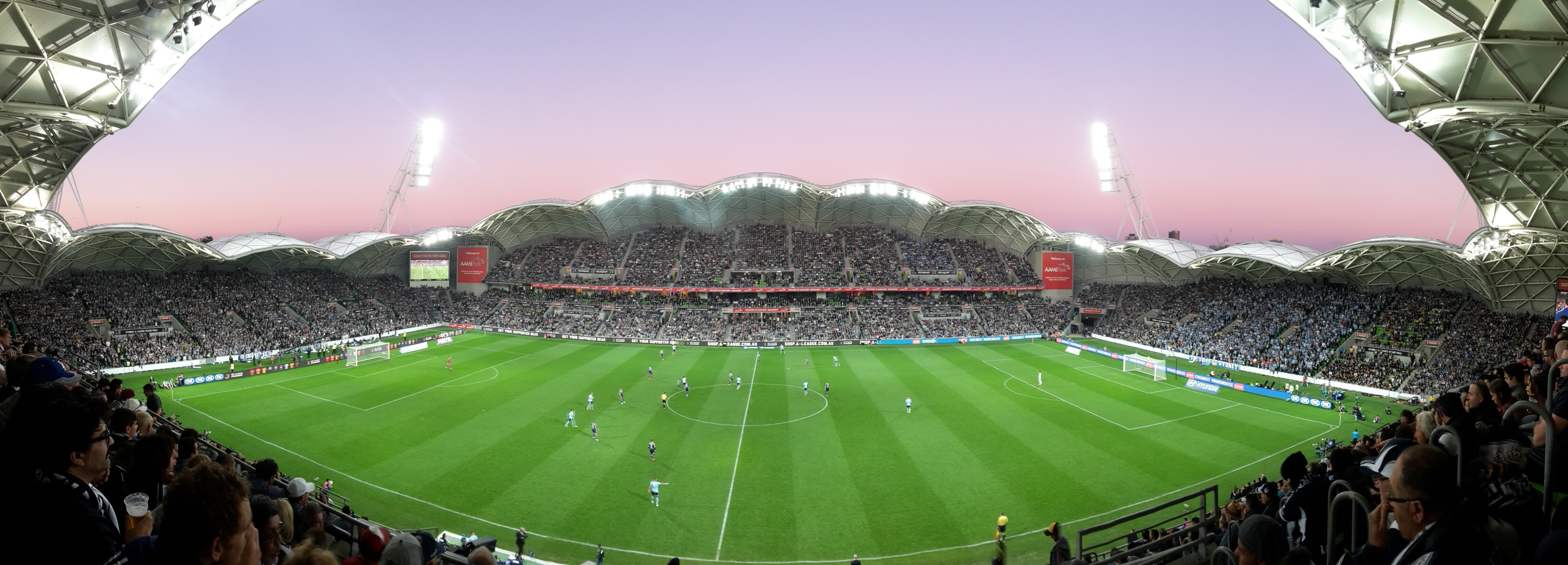
Panorama of AAMI Park, host of the 2015 FFA Cup Final.

On 27 October 2015, Football Federation Australia announced the 2015 FFA Cup Final would be held at either AAMI Park in Melbourne or Perth's nib Stadium. The choice of venue depended on the result of the second semi-final match between Hume City and Melbourne Victory. If Melbourne Victory defeat Hume City, the 2015 Final would be held at AAMI Park. A Hume City win would see the other successful semi-finalist, Perth Glory, host event at nib Stadium. Melbourne Victory's win confirmed the Final venue to be AAMI Park.

The home ground of Melbourne Victory and Melbourne City since its opening in 2010, AAMI Park holds a capacity crowd of 30,050 which makes it the largest capacity rectangular field venue in Victoria. The stadium was one of five host venues for the 2015 AFC Asian Cup.

== Road to the final ==
Melbourne Victory		Round	Perth Glory	
Opponent	Result		Opponent	Result
Balmain Tigers	6–0 (A)	Round of 32	Newcastle Jets	2–2 (A); 4–3 (p)
Rockdale City Suns	3–2 (A)	Round of 16	Queensland Lions (a.e.t.)	1–0 (A)
Adelaide United	3–1 (H)	Quarter-finals	Western Sydney Wanderers	1–1 (H); 4–2 (p)
Hume City	3–0 (A)	Semi-finals	Melbourne City	3–1 (H)
Note: In all results above, the score of the finalist is given first (H: home; A: away).

Melbourne Victory and Perth Glory were among 648 teams who entered the inaugural FFA Cup competition, and as A-League clubs, both entered the tournament in the Round of 32.

Melbourne Victory's first match was an away win 6–0 over fourth-tier Balmain Tigers at Sydney's Leichhardt Oval. Victory were then pushed to a narrow 3–2 win over Rockdale City Suns. After two consecutive away games, Victory defeated reigning FFA Cup winners Adelaide United 3–1, before a 3–0 win over the last non-A-League club Hume City.

Perth Glory began their FFA Cup campaign with a 4–3 penalty shootout win over the Newcastle Jets at Magic Park, after a 1–1 draw in normal time, 2–2 after extra time. They then achieved a 1–0 extra time victory over the Queensland Lions. Following this was a 4–2 penalty shootout victory over the Western Sydney Wanderers after a 1–1 draw in normal time, with the Glory subsequently qualifying for the FFA Cup Final on 21 October 2015, with a 3–1 victory over Melbourne City at nib Stadium.

== Match ==
=== Summary ===
Melbourne Victory were dominant at the beginning of the first half. The home side had the ball in the back of net by the 16th minute courtesy of a strike by New Zealand international Kosta Barbarouses, although the effort was disallowed as Victory defender Matthieu Delpierre was offside. Victory went ahead in the 35th minute, when Oliver Bozanic was on hand after build up on the right from Jason Geria and Barbarouses. Melbourne doubled the advantage seven minutes later with Carl Valeri playing a through-ball into the path of striker Besart Berisha, whose first touch took him past the final defender and then fired the ball across Perth Glory keeper Ante Covic and inside the left post.

Perth started the second half with the majority of possession and almost halved the deficit within four minutes when Diogo Ferreira slammed a shot into the right-hand upright. In the 61st minute, Richard Garcia's first-time effort flew over the crossbar. Perth had most of the scoring chances in the second half without being able to convert any of them. Victory were forced to play the last eight minutes with 10 men after Valeri was sent off for a second bookable offence - a foul on Dino Djulbic.

=== Details ===
7 November 2015
19:30 AEDT

Melbourne Victory	2–0	Perth Glory
Bozanic 35'; Berisha 42'	Report

AAMI Park, Melbourne
Attendance: 15,098
Referee: Ben Williams

Melbourne Victory	Perth Glory

GK	1	(Australia) Danny Vukovic
RB	2	(Australia) Jason Geria
CB	6	(Australia) Leigh Broxham	(yellow card) 33'
CB	17	(France) Matthieu Delpierre
LB	5	(North Macedonia) Daniel Georgievski
RM	21	(Australia) Carl Valeri (c)	(yellow card) 77' (yellow-red card) 86'
CM	7	(Brazil) Guilherme Finkler		(substituted off) 84'
LM	13	(Australia) Oliver Bozanic
RF	9	(New Zealand) Kosta Barbarouses
CF	8	(Albania) Besart Berisha		(substituted off) 88'
LF	14	(Tunisia) Fahid Ben Khalfallah	(yellow card) 40'	(substituted off) 90+2'
Substitutes:
GK	20	(Australia) Lawrence Thomas
DF	24	(Australia) Thomas Deng		(substituted on) 88'
MF	16	(Australia) Rashid Mahazi		(substituted on) 84'
MF	22	(Australia) Jesse Makarounas
FW	11	(Australia) Connor Pain		(substituted on) 90+2'
Manager:
(Australia) Kevin Muscat

GK	1	(Australia) Ante Covic
RB	19	(Australia) Joshua Risdon
CB	6	(Australia) Dino Djulbic	(yellow card) 15'
CB	23	(Australia) Michael Thwaite (c)
LB	3	(Australia) Marc Warren		(substituted off) 86'
RM	10	(Serbia) Nebojša Marinković
CM	13	(Australia) Diogo Ferreira
LM	15	(Australia) Hagi Gligor		(substituted off) 61'
RF	11	(Australia) Richard Garcia
CF	16	(Brazil) Sidnei	(yellow card) 55'	(substituted off) 74'
LF	17	(Spain) Diego Castro
Substitutes:
GK	12	(Australia) Jerrad Tyson
DF	2	(Australia) Alex Grant		(substituted on) 74'
DF	5	(Australia) Antony Golec		(substituted on) 86'
FW	20	(Curaçao) Guyon Fernandez		(substituted on) 61'
FW	21	(Australia) Stefan Valentini
Manager:
(England) Kenny Lowe

Man of the Match (Mark Viduka Medal):
Kosta Barbarouses

Assistant referees:
Luke Brennan
Brad Hobson
Fourth official:
Nathan MacDonald
Additional assistant referees:
Jarred Gillett
Adam Fielding

Match rules:

- 90 minutes.
- 30 minutes of extra time if necessary.
- Penalty shoot-out if scores still level.
- Five named substitutes, of which up to three may be used.

=== Statistics ===
Statistics	Melbourne Victory	Perth Glory
Goals scored	2	0
Total shots	9	11
Shots on target	3	4
Ball possession	49%	51%
Corner kicks	5	8
Fouls	15	17
Offsides	4	2
Yellow cards	2	2
Red cards	1	0

== See also ==
- 2015 FFA Cup
