= Australia Cup =

Australia's largest national knockout soccer competition

- Organiser(s): Football Australia
- Founded: 24 February 2014; 12 years ago (as FFA Cup)
- Region: Australia; New Zealand (2014–2025)
- Teams: 777 (in 2026)
- Qualifier for: AFC Champions League Two
- Current champions: South Melbourne (1st title)
- Most championships: Adelaide United (3 titles)
- Broadcasters: Network 10; Paramount+
- Website: www.australiacup.com.au
- 2026 Australia Cup

The Australia Cup (Note: known as the FFA Cup until the 2021 season) (currently known as the Hahn Australia Cup for sponsorship reasons) is the national soccer knockout cup competition in Australia. This annual competition is organised by Football Australia (known as Football Federation Australia until 2020).

The Australia Cup comprises teams from the top division, A-League Men (known as simply the A-League before the 2021–22 season), as well as those from lower tiers in the Australian soccer league system. Teams enter in progressive stages, with qualifying rounds culminating with the competition proper, starting with the Round of 32. Each of the regional, state or territory-based member federation is granted a team allocation for entry into the main competition, joining clubs from A-League Men.

Initially, all A-League Men's teams entered at the Round of 32. From 2021 to 2025 following further expansion of the league, only the top eight or nine teams entered at the Round of 32, while play-offs were conducted between the four lowest-ranked teams for the final two qualification slots. From 2026, all Australia-based A-League clubs enter at the Round of 32, with New Zealand-based A-League clubs (Wellington Phoenix and Auckland FC) omitted from the competition.

Since 2021, the winner of the competition also qualifies for one of the play-off spots for the following years' AFC club competitions (the AFC Champions League for 2022, the AFC Cup for 2023–24, and the AFC Champions League Two from 2024–25 onwards).

Since the Australian soccer league system provides no promotion and relegation mechanism between the first and lower divisions, part of the competition's appeal stems from the fact that it is the only way that A-League Men and lower-tier clubs can play formal competitive matches.

Adelaide United are the most successful team with three titles. South Melbourne are the defending champions after defeating Melbourne Victory in the 2026 final for their first Australia Cup title.

== History ==
Australia has a long history of regional and state-based knockout cup competitions. However, a sustainable national knockout cup competition that encompassed clubs on all levels of Australian league system has been hard to realise. Prior to the FFA Cup, the first and only Australian national knockout tournament was the Australia Cup. It was founded in 1962 but was abolished in 1968 after just seven seasons of competition. In 1977 a knockout competition called the NSL Cup was founded, which ran in parallel with the former National Soccer League (NSL). This competition involved Australian soccer clubs competing in the then top-flight NSL, plus a limited number of clubs from state-based competitions. The NSL Cup ceased after the 1996–97 tournament. An A-League Pre-Season Challenge Cup competition ran between 2005 and 2008 but involved only the teams from the A-League Men and was not in a traditional knockout format.

The FFA Cup was previously scheduled to commence in 2013, though after suffering numerous delays due to FFA's 2012 television coverage deal and rising cost concerns the competition was put on hold. On 29 August 2013, it was announced that a national FFA Cup would commence in 2014, after what would be two years of organising the knock out competition. On 14 October 2013, FFA announced that it had appointed Sam Chadwick as General Manager of the FFA Cup. On 24 February 2014, the FFA Cup was formally launched by David Gallop.

The first member federation club to qualify for the FFA Cup was Tuggeranong United from the Australian Capital Territory. Tuggeranong United qualified for the 2014 FFA Cup as the winners of the 2013 ACT Federation Cup. The first games in the tournament proper occurred on 29 July 2014, with four games from the Round of 32 played concurrently. In 2014 former three time NSL Champions Adelaide City became the first semi-professional state-league club to defeat a professional A-League club, defeating Western Sydney Wanderers 1–0.

In late 2020 the FFA announced that future winners of the cup would earn an Asian Champions League preliminary round spot. However, this did not initially occur, in part because the AFC competition was re-formatted, with Australia losing some qualification slots for the 2023–24 AFC Champions League. Macarthur FC, the 2022 winner, qualified for the secondary 2023–24 AFC Cup competition.

The 2020 competition was cancelled on 3 July 2020 due to the COVID-19 pandemic in Australia. This on-going pandemic caused further disruptions to both the preliminary rounds and the main competition in 2021.

In 2022 Sydney United 58 became the first National Premier Leagues Men's club to reach the final, defeating A-League Men's club Brisbane Roar in the semi-final. Since then, NPL Clubs Heidelberg United FC (in 2025) and South Melbourne FC (in 2026) have also made it to the final.

== Eligibility ==
Up to and including the 2019 edition, the 32 teams that make up the Australia Cup competition proper have been the 10 A-League teams with the remaining 22 teams composed of various semi-professional and amateur qualifiers, referred to as "Member Federation Clubs", from each of the state federations, with the A-League clubs enter the competition at the Round of 32. From 2021 to 2025, the top eight or nine placed A-League clubs for the season gain automatic qualification to the Round of 32, with the remaining four teams subject to a play-off series for the remaining two positions.

From 2026, only the Australia-based A-League clubs enter at the Round of 32 (with New Zealand-based A-League clubs Wellington Phoenix and Auckland FC omitted), with the winner of the Australian Championship competition also awarded a direct qualification spot.

The number of clubs representing each federation is determined by player registration numbers in each jurisdiction and reviewed annually. Teams from the Northern Territory have been represented since 2015.

From 2015 to 2021, the National Premier Leagues Champion of the previous year qualified for the FFA Cup Round of 32. The first club to qualify via this method was North Eastern MetroStars from South Australia who won the 2014 National Premier Leagues Final Series. Since 2022, as there is no longer an NPL Champion, an additional slot was allocated to Victoria.

Federation	Associated Competition	Round of 32 Qualifiers												
Federation	Associated Competition	2014	2015	2016	2017	2018	2019	2020	2021	2022	2023	2024	2025	2026
Football Australia	A-League Men	10	10	10	10	10	10	10	10	10	10	10	11	10
Football Australia	National Premier Leagues	–	1	1	1	1	1	1	1	–	–	–	–	–
Football Australia	Australian Championship	–	–	–	–	–	–	–	–	–	–	–	–	1
Capital Football (ACT)	Federation Cup (ACT)	1	1	1	1	1	1	1	1	1	1	1	1	1
Northern NSW Football	NNSWF State Cup	2	2	2	2	2	2	2	2	2	2	2	2	2
Football NSW	Waratah Cup	7	5	5	5	5	5	4	4	4	4	4	4	4
Football Northern Territory	NT Australia Cup Final	–	1	1	1	1	1	1	1	1	1	1	1	1
Football Queensland	Queensland Cup (Note: Previously linked with the Brisbane-based Canale Cup competition.)	4	4	4	4	4	4	4	4	4	4	4	4	4
Football South Australia	Federation Cup (SA)	1	1	1	1	1	1	2	2	2	2	2	2	2
Football Tasmania	Milan Lakoseljac Cup	1	1	1	1	1	1	1	1	1	1	1	1	1
Football Victoria	Dockerty Cup	4	4	4	4	4	4	4	4	5	5	5	4	4
Football West (WA)	State Cup	2	2	2	2	2	2	2	2	2	2	2	2	2
Total Entrants		631	648	704	735	781	736	765	765	750	778	759	718	777

== Competition format ==
The competition proper is a five-round, 32-team knockout tournament. In the event of a match being drawn after the completion of 90 minutes, extra time is played, followed by a penalty shoot-out if required. In some preliminary rounds, games can go straight to penalties if tied at 90 minutes.

Since 2022, an open draw for each round is made from the Round of 32 to the Semi-Finals, with home ground preference given to Member Federation Clubs where they are drawn against A-League opposition. In 2021 there was a restricted draw for the Round of 32 and Round of 16, split into different geographic zones to minimise travel requirements during the COVID-19 pandemic. In prior years, the draw was made to ensure that there would be some progression of Member Federation Clubs to later rounds, including one Member Federation club guaranteed to make the Semi Final. New Zealand-based A-League teams must play all of their matches in Australia, away from home.

The inaugural 2014 FFA Cup Final was held as a mid-week fixture on Tuesday 16 December 2014, in order to minimise the impact on the scheduling of the 2014–15 A-League season, already disrupted by Australia hosting the 2015 AFC Asian Cup. For the following year, the 2015 FFA Cup Final was played on a weekend date free of other 2015–16 A-League games, to "emphasise the importance of the Final". From 2016 to 2019, the Final was staged as a mid-week fixture.

== Trophy ==
The trophy is a large traditional style cup with an intentional resemblance to the historical Australia Cup trophy which ran from 1962 to 1968. The cup itself is made from silver-soldered brass, which is plated with 24 carat gold and sterling silver. It has two handles which each have the badge of Football Federation Australia inscribed on the inside corners. Also inscribed on the cup is the design of the cup and the words FFA Cup. The trophy features two soccer balls, one as the base of the cup and the other as a trim, on the very top of the cup lid. The Australia Cup Trophy was created by D3 Design, who also designed the A-League, W-League and NPL Champions silverware.

== Sponsorship ==
In its inaugural season the FFA Cup joined with an official naming rights partner. In 2014, Westfield Group was announced as the sponsor for the first three seasons of the cup tournament, known for commercial purposes as the "Westfield FFA Cup".

Between 2014 and 2016 Umbro supplied match balls for all FFA Cup matches. The FFA Cup Match Ball, the Umbro Neo 150 Elite, was specially designed for the competition. Between 2017 and 2019 Mitre supplied the Mitre Delta Hyperseam as the official FFA Cup match ball after a public vote to select between three alternate ball designs. After the cancellation of the 2020 competition, Mitre introduced the Mitre Delta Max for the 2021 FFA Cup. After using the Delta Max for the 2022 competition, the Mitre Ultimax Pro was chosen to replace it for 2023. The Ultimax Pro continued to be used in 2025.

On 25 November 2024, it was announced that beverage company Hahn would become the naming rights sponsor of the competition from 2025 onwards, in a three-year deal.

== Records and statistics ==
=== Team records ===
==== Final ====
- Most wins: 3, Adelaide United (2014, 2018, 2019).
- Most consecutive wins: 2, Adelaide United (2018, 2019).
- Most appearances in the final: 4, Adelaide United (2014, 2017, 2018, 2019) and Sydney FC (2016, 2017, 2018, 2023)
- Most consecutive appearances in the final: 3, Adelaide United (2017, 2018, 2019) and Sydney FC (2016, 2017, 2018).
- Biggest win: Adelaide United 4–0 Melbourne City, (2019 FFA Cup Final, 23 October 2019).

==== Round of 32 onwards ====
- Biggest win: Darwin Olympic 0–9 Nunawading City, (Round of 32, 22 July 2025).
- Biggest home win: Lions FC 6–0 Casuarina FC, (Round of 32, 21 September 2021)
- Most clubs competing in a season: 781 (2018)
- Highest scoring: 9,
  - Hills Brumbies 3–6 (a.e.t.) Hakoah Sydney City East, (Round of 32, 26 July 2017).
  - Sydney United 58 7–2 Far North Queensland, (Round of 32, 9 August 2017).
  - Perth Glory 5–4 (a.e.t.) Melbourne City, (Round of 32, 3 August 2024).
  - Darwin Olympic 0–9 Nunawading City, (Round of 32, 22 July 2025).
- Highest attendance: 29,911, South Melbourne v. Melbourne Victory, (2026 Australia Cup Final, 10 October 2026)
- Lowest attendance: 327, Bonnyrigg White Eagles v. Manly United, (Round of 32, 3 August 2016).

==== Preliminary rounds ====
- Biggest win and highest scoring: 31,
  - Teviot Downs 0–31 Bayside United, (Second round, 2 March 2019)
  - Albion Park White Eagles 31–0 Epping FC, (Second round, 14 March 2020)

=== Individual records ===
==== Final ====
- Most wins by a player: 3,
  - Luke Brattan (Melbourne City - 2016, Sydney FC - 2023 & Macarthur FC - 2024).
  - Michael Jakobsen (Melbourne City - 2016 & Adelaide United - 2018, 2019).
  - Michael Marrone (Adelaide United - 2014, 2018, 2019).
- Most appearances in a final: 4, Michael Marrone (Adelaide United - 2014, 2017, 2018, 2019).
- Youngest goalscorer in a final: 18 years and 186 days, Thomas Waddingham (for Brisbane Roar v. Sydney FC, Final, 7 October 2023).
- Oldest goalscorer in a final: 36 years and 360 days, Tim Cahill (for Melbourne City v. Sydney FC, Final, 30 November 2016).

==== Round of 32 onwards ====
- Most appearances: 26, Rhyan Grant (2015–present).
- Most career goals: 15, Liam Boland (2016–present).
- Most goals in a season: 8, Bobô (Sydney FC, 2017).
- Most goals in a game: 5, Lachlan Brook (for Western Sydney Wanderers v. Floreat Athena, Round of 32, 9 August 2023).
- Fastest goal: 26 seconds, Daniel Heffernan (for Heidelberg United v. Sydney United 58, Round of 16, 26 August 2015).
- Fastest hat-trick: 18 minutes, Matt Sim (for Central Coast Mariners v. Palm Beach Sharks, Quarter-finals, 14 October 2014).
- Youngest goalscorer: 15 years and 193 days, Quinn MacNicol (for Brisbane Roar v. Sydney United 58, Round of 16, 26 August 2023).
- Youngest player: 13 years and 243 days, Ymer Abili (for Oakleigh Cannons v. Macarthur FC, Semi-finals, 14 September 2022).
- Oldest goalscorer: 42 years and 120 days, Daniel McBreen (for Edgeworth FC v. Central Coast Mariners, Round of 16, 21 August 2019).
- Oldest player: 42 years and 120 days, Daniel McBreen (for Edgeworth FC v. Central Coast Mariners, Round of 16, 21 August 2019).

==== Preliminary rounds ====
- Fastest goal: 11.2 seconds, Shaun Robinson (for Nerang Soccer Club v. Bribie Island Tigers FC, Second round, 13 February 2021).
- Most goals in a game: 14, Cameron Morgan (for Albion Park White Eagles v. Epping FC, Second round, 14 March 2020).

== Winners and finalists ==
=== List of finals ===
Season	Champions	Score	Runners-up	Venue	City/Town	Attendance	Qualification to
2014	Adelaide United	1–0	Perth Glory	Hindmarsh Stadium	Adelaide	16,142	—
2015	Melbourne Victory	2–0	Perth Glory	Melbourne Rectangular Stadium	Melbourne	15,098	—
2016	Melbourne City	1–0	Sydney FC	Melbourne Rectangular Stadium	Melbourne	18,751	—
2017	Sydney FC	2–1 (a.e.t.)	Adelaide United	Sydney Football Stadium	Sydney	13,452	—
2018	Adelaide United	2–1	Sydney FC	Hindmarsh Stadium	Adelaide	14,448	—
2019	Adelaide United	4–0	Melbourne City	Hindmarsh Stadium	Adelaide	14,920	—
2020	Tournament cancelled due to the COVID-19 pandemic in Australia						
2021	Melbourne Victory	2–1	Central Coast Mariners	Melbourne Rectangular Stadium	Melbourne	15,343	2022 AFC Champions League play-off round
2022	Macarthur FC	2–0	Sydney United 58	Western Sydney Stadium	Sydney	16,461	2023–24 AFC Cup group stage
2023	Sydney FC	3–1	Brisbane Roar	Sydney Football Stadium	Sydney	15,482	2024–25 AFC Champions League Two group stage
2024	Macarthur FC	1–0	Melbourne Victory	Melbourne Rectangular Stadium	Melbourne	13,289	2025–26 AFC Champions League Two group stage
2025	Newcastle Jets	3–1 (a.e.t.)	Heidelberg United	Lakeside Stadium	Melbourne	10,000	2026–27 AFC Champions League Two group stage (Note: As 2025 Australia Cup winners Newcastle Jets qualified for the Champions League Elite via their league position, the spot reserved for the Australia Cup winners was transferred to the next highest Australian team in the 2025–26 A-League Men not already qualified for continental football.)
2026	South Melbourne	1–1 (4–3) (p)	Melbourne Victory	Melbourne Rectangular Stadium	Melbourne	29,911	2027–28 AFC Champions League Two

=== Results by team ===
Since its establishment, the Australia Cup has been won by 7 different teams.

Club	Titles	Runners-up	Seasons won	Seasons runners-up	Total final appearances
Adelaide United	3	1	2014, 2018, 2019	2017	4
Sydney FC	2	2	2017, 2023	2016, 2018	4
Melbourne Victory	2	2	2015, 2021	2024, 2026	4
Macarthur FC	2	0	2022, 2024	—	2
Melbourne City	1	1	2016	2019	2
Newcastle Jets	1	0	2025	—	1
South Melbourne FC	1	0	2026	—	1
Perth Glory	0	2	—	2014, 2015	2
Central Coast Mariners	0	1	—	2021	1
Sydney United 58	0	1	—	2022	1
Brisbane Roar	0	1	—	2023	1
Heidelberg United	0	1	—	2025	1

== Individual honours ==
=== Mark Viduka Medal ===
The medal is awarded to the player of the match in the Australia Cup final.

Year	Player/s	Club/s	Ref.
2014	(Spain) Sergio Cirio	Adelaide United	
2015	(New Zealand) Kosta Barbarouses	Melbourne Victory	
2016	(Uruguay) Bruno Fornaroli	Melbourne City	
2017	(Poland) Adrian Mierzejewski	Sydney FC	
2018	(Australia) Craig Goodwin	Adelaide United	
2019	(Australia) Al Hassan Toure	Adelaide United	
2020	No competition		
2021	(Australia) Jake Brimmer (Australia) Kye Rowles (Note: Player on the losing team)	Melbourne Victory; Central Coast Mariners	
2022	(Mexico) Ulises Dávila	Macarthur FC	
2023	(England) Joe Lolley	Sydney FC	
2024	(Poland) Filip Kurto	Macarthur FC	
2025	(Australia) Max Burgess	Newcastle Jets	
2026	(Spain) Javier Díaz López	South Melbourne	

=== Michael Cockerill Medal ===
Named after the late former journalist and broadcaster, the Michael Cockerill Medal recognizes the tournament's standout performer from a Member Federation Club.

Year	Player	Club	Ref.
2018	(Burundi) Elvis Kamsoba	Avondale FC	
2019	(England) Fraser Hills	Brisbane Strikers	
2020	No competition		
2021	(Australia) Finn Beakhurst	Lions FC	
2022	(England) Joe Guest	Oakleigh Cannons	
2023	(Australia) Hamish Gow	North Eastern MetroStars	
2024	(Australia) Liam Boland	Olympic Kingsway	
2025	(Australia) Fletcher Fulton	Heidelberg United	
2026	(Australia) Marco Janković	South Melbourne	

== Media coverage ==
In the tournament's first season, 10 matches were broadcast live on Fox Sports. Internationally, several FFA Cup matches were broadcast live in South Asian nations, such as: Afghanistan, Bangladesh, Bhutan, India, Maldives, Nepal, Pakistan and Sri Lanka, after a three-season deal with TEN Sports in 2014.

In 2015 and 2016 Fox Sports streamed live all non-broadcast games via their online services.

From 2017 onwards, 5 FFA Cup matches (from quarter finals) were broadcast live by beIN Sports in Asia-Pacific nations, such as: Brunei, Hong Kong, Indonesia, Malaysia, Philippines, Singapore, and Thailand. 7 FFA Cup matches were broadcast live by BT Sport in the UK and Republic of Ireland.

From 2018, at least 1 FFA Cup match per round was scheduled to be broadcast live by ESPN+ in the United States and in other countries where the rights were not sold, most of the matches were streamed live by YouTube via My Football channel.

In 2017 the ABC held the Radio broadcast rights for FFA Cup matches, including the Final.

In 2021 Network 10 and Paramount+ obtained the TV broadcast rights for the next 5 years, starting from the round of 32 of the FFA Cup/Australia Cup all the way until the finals.

In 2025 Football Australia assumed broadcast production responsibilities from the Playoffs through to the Quarter Finals, with Paramount Australia taking over production for the Semi Finals and Final. Matches were shared between 10 and Paramount+.

In 2026 Edition, Football Australia broadcast production responsibilities with Network 10 from the Round of 32 through to the Round of 16, Paramount+ Australia taking over production for the Quarter Finals, Semi Finals and the Final with jointly broadcast production with Network 10. Viewers outside Australia also able to stream the tournament for free via Football Australia Youtube channel.

== Women's Australia Cup ==
In March 2023, Football Australia announced that it would launch a Women's Australia Cup in 2024, with the competition to run in parallel with the men's Australia Cup, acting as a qualification pathway for the AFC Women's Champions League. The competition did not eventuate.

== See also ==
- List of Australian soccer champions – National Cup winners
