= 2016 FFA Cup final =

Final game for 2016 season of Australian knockout soccer competition

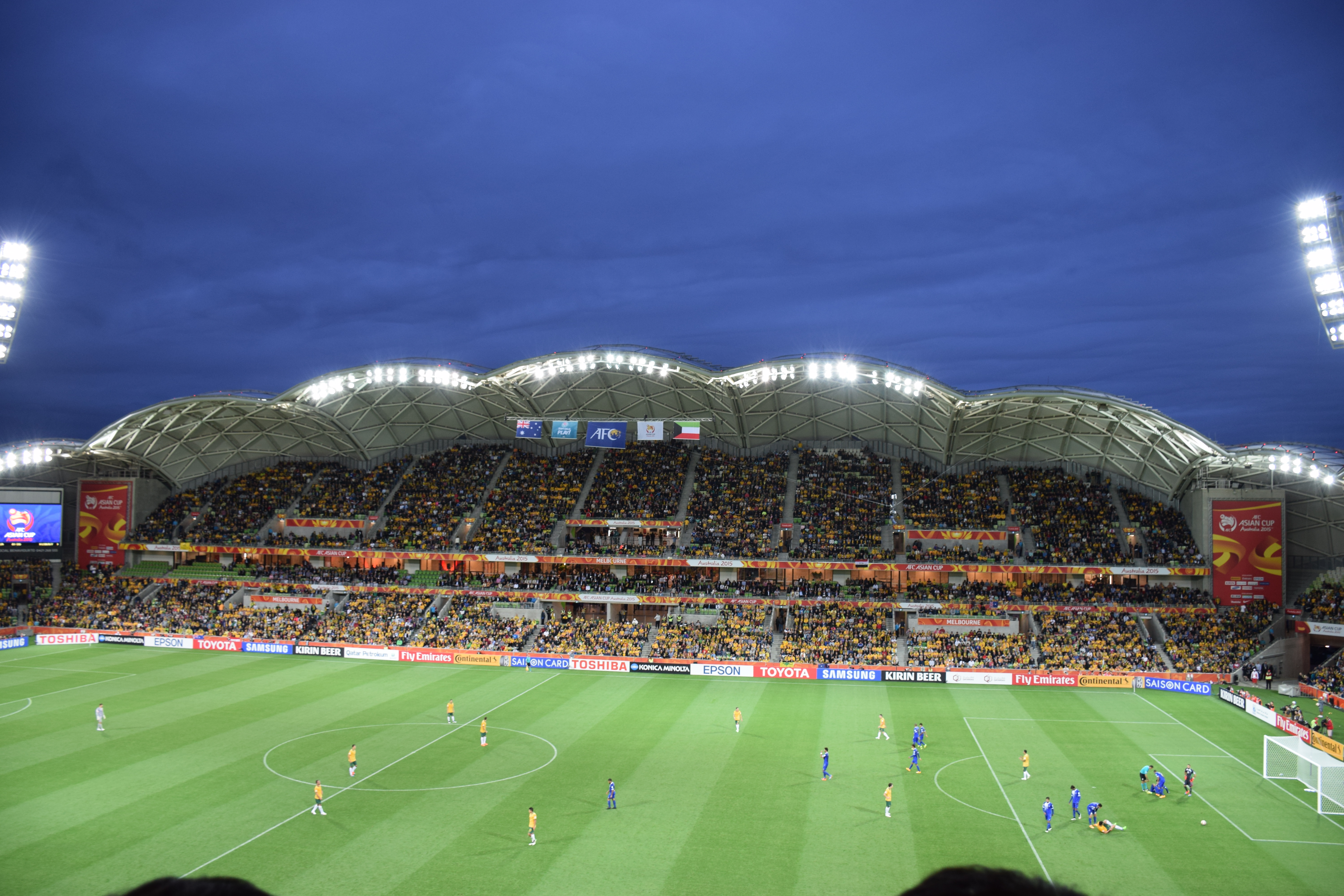
- AAMI Park hosted the match.
- Event: FFA Cup Final
Melbourne City	Sydney FC
1	0
- Date: 30 November 2016
- Venue: AAMI Park, Melbourne
- Man of the Match: Bruno Fornaroli
- Referee: Peter Green
- Attendance: 18,751
- Weather: Overcast; 19 °C (66 °F)

The 2016 FFA Cup final was the third final of the FFA Cup (now known as the Australia Cup), the premier soccer knockout cup competition in Australia. The match was held on 30 November 2016 at AAMI Park. Melbourne Victory were the defending champions, but were defeated 2–0 by Melbourne City in the semi-finals. The other team to qualify for the Final was Sydney FC, who defeated Canberra Olympic 3–0 in their respective semi-final.

The Final was the first to feature either Melbourne City or Sydney FC. Melbourne City won the match 1–0, Tim Cahill scoring the only goal via a header. As of October 2023, it remains the largest attended FFA Cup final in the tournaments history, despite the match being played on a Wednesday evening, with a crowd of 18,751.

== Road to the final ==
Melbourne City		Round	Sydney FC	
Opponent	Result		Opponent	Result
Floreat Athena	2–1 (A)	Round of 32	Wollongong Wolves	3–0 (A)
Brisbane Strikers	2–1 (A)	Round of 16	Perth Glory (a.e.t)	2–0 (A)
Western Sydney Wanderers	4–1 (H)	Quarter-finals	Blacktown City	3–0 (A)
Melbourne Victory	2–0 (A)	Semi-finals	Canberra Olympic	3–0 (A)
Note: In all results above, the score of the finalist is given first (H: home; A: away).

=== Melbourne City ===
Melbourne City were among 704 teams who entered the FFA Cup competition, and as an A-League club, entered the tournament in the Round of 32.

Melbourne City travelled to Perth for the opening Round of 32 clash against second-tier side Floreat Athena and narrowly won 2–1.

In the Round of 16, City were pitted against second-tier club Brisbane Strikers. Playing away from home, City went down a goal before coming from behind to win 2–1 again.

City then put in arguably the most impressive performance of their cup campaign, defeating A-League opponent Western Sydney Wanderers 4–1 at home.

In a spiteful derby semi-final, City defeated rivals Melbourne Victory 2–0 at AAMI Park.

=== Sydney FC ===
Same as their opponents, Sydney FC entered the tournament in the Round of 32.

Sydney FC began their FFA Cup journey with a 3–0 win over the Wollongong Wolves at WIN Stadium.

They then defeated fellow A-League side Perth Glory 2–0, away from home at Dorrien Gardens in Perth.

Sydney FC were drawn to face in-form second division side Blacktown City at the Sydney United Sports Centre, though were again clinical in a 3–0 victory.

Their semi-final opponents, Canberra Olympic were competitive though unable to match the Sky Blues' firing power, Sydney winning the match 3–0.

== Pre-match ==
=== Venue selection ===
The FFA announced that AAMI Park would host the 2016 final. AAMI Park also hosted the 2015 FFA Cup Final and the 2015 A-League Grand Final. In outlining the reason for the decision, FFA CEO David Gallop argued AAMI Park would succeed in "maximising attendance and broadcast numbers while ensuring the Cup Final is played in a venue that embodies the unique spirit of the competition". The decision to play the Final at AAMI Park was controversial. Sydney FC chairman Scott Barlow labelled the decision "a slap in the face" to the club, who did not have a single home game throughout the tournament and had the best record of the two finalists. Barlow also hit out at the fact AAMI Park would host the Final for the second consecutive year and said the "decision was made by the FFA purely for commercial reasons, it is an unfair decision to our club and it is Sydney FC fans who are the ones that will miss out".

=== Broadcasting ===
The match was broadcast live on Fox Sports. A live stream of the match was available for all Fox Sports TV subscribers through News Corp with a full replay available upon the completion of match.

=== Opening ceremony ===
A minute's silence was held moments before the start of the match out of respect for the players of the Chapecoense club from Brazil, many of whom were killed in a plane crash in Colombia two days earlier.

== Match ==
=== Summary ===
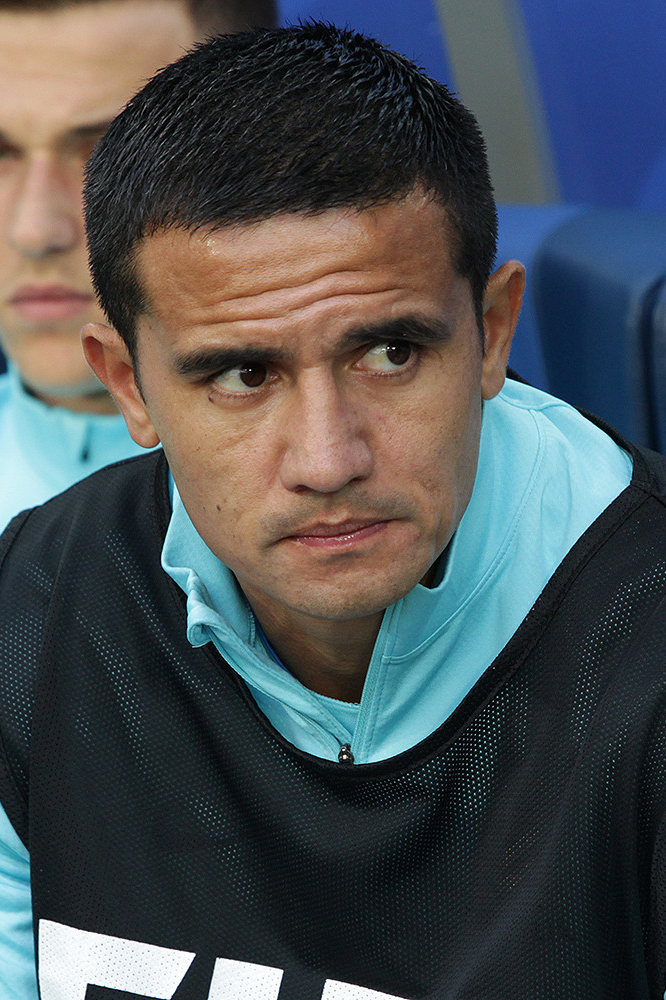
Tim Cahill (pictured in 2017) scored the only goal of the game.

==== First half ====
The match was a mostly cagey affair with neither side being able to grab the ascendancy and dominate proceedings. A feisty tackle by City midfielder Luke Brattan on Michael Zullo inside the opening 10 minutes resulted in a yellow card and set the tone for aggressive hostilities between the two teams. The best chance of the first half fell to the eventual goalscorer Tim Cahill, who headed fractionally wide from a set piece in the 35th minute. Both teams had good spells of possession and entered threatening areas, though both lacked the finishing class to put their team in front.

==== Second half ====
In the second half, Sydney's Alex Brosque missed an early chance and was immediately punished following a perfect cross by Ivan Franjic, which found Cahill unmarked and resulted in a header into the free opposite corner of the goal. Sydney's best chance to equalise came in the 70th minute, when Bobô headed from a Matt Simon cross into an unmarked goal; however, desperate defending on the line from defender Michael Jakobsen kept City's clean sheet intact. The match reached fever pitch in the final five minutes, with Brosque being denied a clear shot on goal due to controversial defending by City defender Osama Malik and winger Fernando Brandán squandering a golden opportunity to double the home side's lead. It mattered not however, as City hung on to claim its first ever trophy of any kind as a senior team.

=== Details ===
30 November 2016
19:30 AEDT

Melbourne City	1–0	Sydney FC
Cahill 53'	Report

AAMI Park, Melbourne
Attendance: 18,751
Referee: Peter Green

Melbourne City	Sydney FC

GK	20	Dean Bouzanis (AUS)
RB	8	Neil Kilkenny (AUS)
CB	6	Osama Malik (AUS)
CB	22	Michael Jakobsen (DEN)
LB	5	Ivan Franjic (AUS)
CDM	26	Luke Brattan (AUS)
CM	17	Tim Cahill (AUS)		(substituted off) 61'
CM	9	Nicolás Colazo (ARG)
LW	11	Bruce Kamau (AUS)		(substituted off) 83'
ST	23	Bruno Fornaroli (c) (URU)
RW	27	Fernando Brandán (ARG)
Substitutes:
GK	1	Thomas Sørensen (DEN)
DF	2	Manny Muscat (MLT)
DF	4	Connor Chapman (AUS)
MF	10	Anthony Cáceres (AUS)		(substituted on) 61'
FW	12	Nicholas Fitzgerald (AUS)	(yellow card) 89'	(substituted on) 83'
Manager:
John van 't Schip (NED)

GK	20	Danny Vukovic (AUS)
RB	23	Rhyan Grant (AUS)
CB	2	Sebastian Ryall (AUS)
CB	5	Matt Jurman (AUS)
LB	7	Michael Zullo (AUS)
CDM	13	Brandon O'Neill (AUS)	(yellow card) 26'	(substituted off) 72'
CDM	6	Joshua Brillante (AUS)
LM	10	Miloš Ninković (SRB)
CAM	14	Alex Brosque (c) (AUS)
RM	21	Filip Hološko (SVK)		(substituted off) 62'
ST	9	Bobô (BRA)
Substitutes:
GK	30	Mitch Evans (AUS)
DF	17	David Carney (AUS)	(yellow card) 87'	(substituted on) 72'
DF	4	Alex Wilkinson (AUS)
MF	8	Miloš Dimitrijević (SRB)
FW	18	Matt Simon (AUS)		(substituted on) 62'
Manager:
Graham Arnold (AUS)

Man of the Match (Mark Viduka Medal):
Bruno Fornaroli

Assistant referees:
Paul Cetrangolo
Nathan MacDonald
Fourth official:
Luke Brennan
Additional assistant referees:
Alan Milliner
Rebecca Durcau

Match rules:

- 90 minutes.
- 30 minutes of extra time if necessary.
- Penalty shoot-out if scores still level.
- Five named substitutes, of which up to three may be used.

=== Statistics ===
Statistics	Melbourne City	Sydney FC
Goals scored	1	0
Total shots	9	5
Shots on target	4	3
Ball possession	54%	46%
Corner kicks	7	2
Fouls	15	15
Offsides	5	8
Yellow cards	2	2
Red cards	0	0

== Post-match ==
Melbourne City captain Bruno Fornaroli was named man of the match. In his post-match address, Fornaroli uttered a loud profanity into the microphone, which resulted in him and the club being issued a formal warning by the FFA. The crowd of 18,751 was the highest ever for any match in the FFA Cup to that point in time. Melbourne City received $50,000 for winning the tournament, and Sydney FC received $25,000.

== See also ==
- 2016 FFA Cup
- 2016–17 Melbourne City FC season
- 2016–17 Sydney FC season
