= PFA Men's Footballer of the Year =

Best Australian soccer player of the year

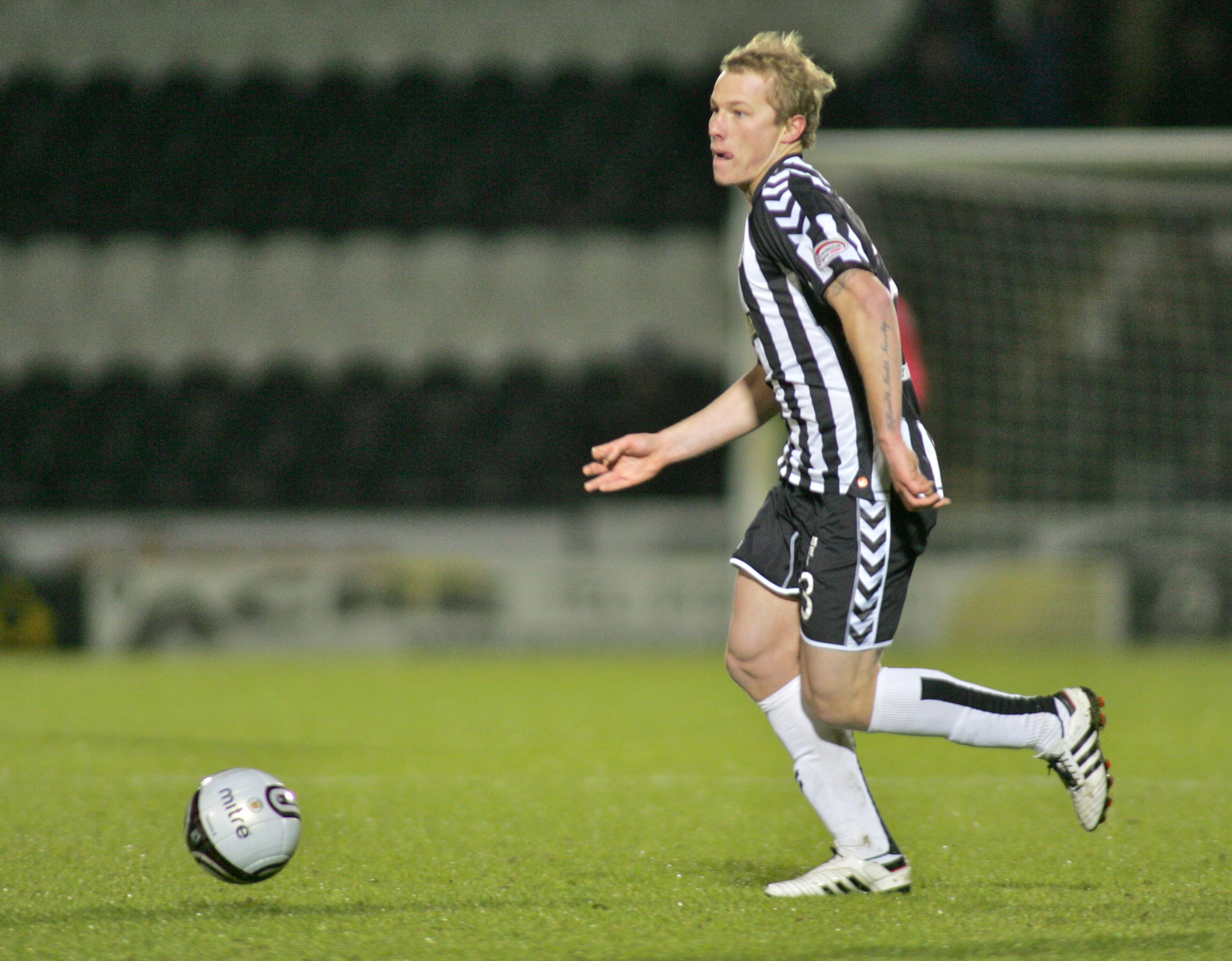
- Aaron Mooy has won the award three times.
- Sport: Association football
- Country: Australia
- Presented by: PFA

History
- First award: 2009
- Editions: 14
- First winner: (Australia) Tim Cahill
- Most wins: (Australia) Aaron Mooy, (Australia) Mathew Ryan (3 wins each)
- Most recent: (Australia) Jordan Bos
- Website: Official website

The Professional Footballers Australia Men's Footballer of the Year (often called PFA Men's Footballer of the Year) is an annual award given to the player who is adjudged to have been the best of the year in Australian soccer. The award has been presented since the 2008–09 season and the winner is chosen by a vote amongst the members of the players' trade union, Professional Footballers Australia (PFA). The current holder is Tom Rogic, who won the award on 26 May 2022.

The first winner of the award was Everton midfielder Tim Cahill. As of 2022, only Mathew Ryan and Aaron Mooy have won the award on multiple occasions, and only Mooy has won the award in consecutive seasons. Mooy has won the award a record three times. Although there is a separate Harry Kewell Medal for players under the age of 23, young players remain eligible to win the senior award, and on one occasion the same player won both awards for a season, Ryan in 2014–15.

The award is open to players playing in the A-League Men and Australian players playing overseas. No non-Australian player has won the award as of 2026.

== Winners ==
The award has been presented on 15 occasions as of 2023, with 11 different winners.

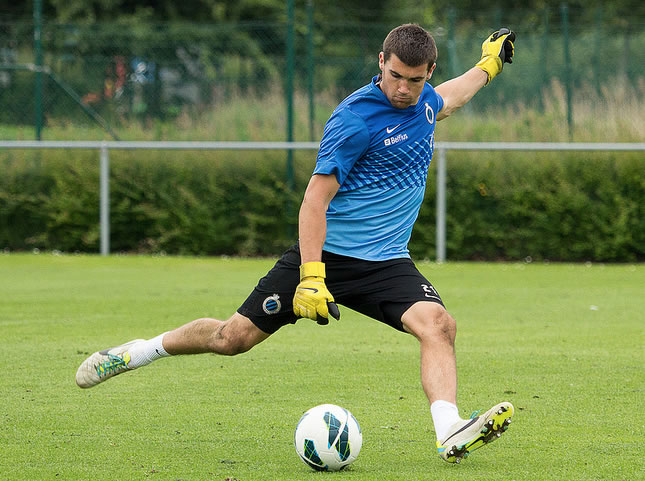
Mathew Ryan was the first player to win the Footballer of the Year award and Harry Kewell Medal in the same season.

Year	Player	Club	Notes
2008–09	(Australia) Tim Cahill	(England) Everton	
2009–10	(Australia) Mark Schwarzer	(England) Fulham	First goalkeeper to win the award
2010–11	(Australia) Matt McKay	(Australia) Brisbane Roar	First A-League player to win the award
2011–12	(Australia) Brett Holman	(Netherlands) AZ Alkmaar	
2012–13	(Australia) Robbie Kruse	(Germany) Fortuna Düsseldorf	
2013–14	(Australia) Mile Jedinak	(England) Crystal Palace	
2014–15	(Australia) Mathew Ryan	(Belgium) Club Brugge	
2015–16	(Australia) Aaron Mooy	(Australia) Melbourne City	
2016–17	(Australia) Aaron Mooy	(England) Huddersfield Town	First player to win the award twice First player to win the award in consecutive seasons
2017–18	(Australia) Aaron Mooy	(England) Huddersfield Town	First player to win the award three times First player to win the award in three consecutive seasons
2018–19	(Australia) Mathew Ryan	(England) Brighton & Hove Albion	
2019–20	(Australia) Mathew Ryan	(England) Brighton & Hove Albion	
2020–21	(Australia) Jamie Maclaren	(Australia) Melbourne City	
2021–22	(Australia) Tom Rogic	(Scotland) Celtic	
2022–23	(Australia) Craig Goodwin	(Australia) Adelaide United	
2023–24	(Australia) Jackson Irvine	(Germany) FC St. Pauli	
2024–25	(Australia) Aziz Behich	(Australia) Melbourne City	
2025–26	(Australia) Jordan Bos	(Netherlands) Feyenoord	

== Breakdown of winners ==
=== By country ===
Country	Number of wins	Winning years
Australia	16	2008–09, 2009–10, 2010–11, 2011–12, 2012–13, 2013–14, 2014–15, 2015–16, 2016–17, 2017–18, 2018–19, 2019–20, 2020–21, 2021–22, 2022–23, 2023–24, 2024–25, 2025–26

=== By club ===
Club	Number of wins	Winning years
(Australia) Melbourne City	3	2015–16, 2020–21, 2024–25
(England) Brighton & Hove Albion	2	2018–19, 2019–20
(England) Huddersfield Town	2	2016–17, 2017–18
(Australia) Adelaide United	1	2022–23
(Netherlands) AZ Alkmaar	1	2011–12
(Australia) Brisbane Roar	1	2010–11
(Scotland) Celtic	1	2021–22
(Belgium) Club Brugge	1	2014–15
(England) Crystal Palace	1	2013–14
(England) Everton	1	2008–09
(Germany) FC St. Pauli	1	2023–24
(Netherlands) Feyenoord	1	2025–26
(Germany) Fortuna Düsseldorf	1	2012–13
(England) Fulham	1	2009–10

== See also ==
- PFA Footballer of the Year Awards
- Johnny Warren Medal
