= Harry Kewell Medal =

Award for under-23 soccer players in Australia

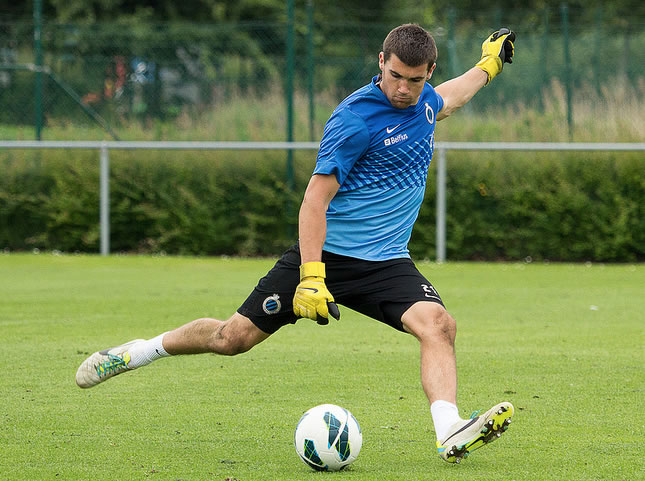
- Mathew Ryan has won the award three times.
- Sport: Association football
- Country: Australia
- Presented by: PFA

History
- First award: 2009
- Editions: 17
- First winner: (Australia) Nikita Rukavytsya
- Most wins: (Australia) Mathew Ryan (3 wins)
- Most recent: (Australia) Lucas Herrington
- Website: Official website

The PFA Harry Kewell Medal is an annual award given for outstanding performance by an under-23 player playing in the A-League or overseas-based Australian. The award has been presented since 2008–09, and the winner is chosen by a vote amongst the members of the players' trade union, Professional Footballers Australia (PFA). It is named after former Australian star Harry Kewell, who represented Australia between 1996 and 2012, and was noted for his achievements from a young age. The first winner of the award was Perth Glory winger Nikita Rukavytsya. The most recent winner is Lucus Herrington.

As of 2020, only Mathew Ryan has won the award on more than one occasion. Three players from outside of Australia, Marco Rojas, Liberato Cacace and Alex Paulsen (all from New Zealand), have won the award. Although they have their own dedicated award, players aged 23 or under at the start of the season remain eligible to win the PFA Men's Footballer of the Year award, and on one occasion the same player has won both awards for a season.

== Winners ==
The award has been presented on 13 occasions as of 2020, with 11 different winners.

Year	Player	Club	Notes
2008–09	(Australia) Nikita Rukavytsya	(Australia) Perth Glory	
2009–10	(Australia) Mitch Langerak	(Australia) Melbourne Victory	First goalkeeper to win the award
2010–11	(Australia) Robbie Kruse	(Australia) Melbourne Victory	
2011–12	(Australia) Mathew Ryan	(Australia) Central Coast Mariners	
2012–13	(New Zealand) Marco Rojas	(Australia) Melbourne Victory	First winner from outside Australia
2013–14	(Australia) Mathew Ryan	(Belgium) Club Brugge	First player to win the award twice First player to win the award playing for a non-A-League club
2014–15	(Australia) Mathew Ryan	(Belgium) Club Brugge	First player to win the award three times First player to win the award in consecutive seasons
2015–16	(Australia) Jamie Maclaren	(Australia) Brisbane Roar	
2016–17	(Australia) Alex Gersbach	(Norway) Rosenborg BK	
2017–18	(Australia) Daniel Arzani	(Australia) Melbourne City	
2018–19	(Australia) Chris Ikonomidis	(Australia) Perth Glory	
2019–20	(New Zealand) Liberato Cacace	(New Zealand) Wellington Phoenix	
2020–21	(Australia) Connor Metcalfe	(Australia) Melbourne City	
2021–22	(Australia) Denis Genreau	(France) Toulouse	
2022–23	(Australia) Jordan Bos	(Australia) Melbourne City	
2023–24	(New Zealand) Alex Paulsen	(New Zealand) Wellington Phoenix	
2024–25	(Australia) Nicolas Milanovic	(Australia) Western Sydney Wanderers	
2025–26	(Australia) Lucas Herrington	(Australia) Brisbane Roar (United States) Colorado Rapids	

== Breakdown of winners ==
=== By country ===
Country	Number of wins	Winning years
Australia	15	2008–09, 2009–10, 2010–11, 2011–12, 2013–14, 2014–15, 2015–16, 2016–17, 2017–18, 2018–19, 2020–21, 2021–22 2022–23, 2024–25, 2025–26
New Zealand	3	2012–13, 2019–20, 2023–24

=== By club ===
Club	Number of wins	Winning years
(Australia) Melbourne City	3	2017–18, 2020–21, 2022–23
(Australia) Melbourne Victory	3	2009–10, 2010–11, 2012–13
(Australia) Brisbane Roar	2	2015–16, 2025–26
(Belgium) Club Brugge	2	2013–14, 2014–15
(Australia) Perth Glory	2	2008–09, 2018–19
(New Zealand) Wellington Phoenix	2	2019–20, 2023–24
(Australia) Central Coast Mariners	1	2011–12
(United States) Colorado Rapids	1	2025–26
(Norway) Rosenborg	1	2016–17
(France) Toulouse	1	2021–22
(Australia) Western Sydney Wanderers	1	2024–25

== See also ==
- PFA Footballer of the Year Awards
