= Jarred Gillett =

Australian soccer referee (born 1986)

- Full name: Jarred Gavan Gillett
- Born: 1 November 1986 (age 40); Gold Coast, Queensland, Australia

Domestic
| Years | League | Role |
| 2010–2019 | (Australia) (New Zealand) A-League | Referee |
| 2019– | (England) EFL | Referee |
| 2021– | (England) Premier League | Referee |

International
| Years | League | Role |
| 2013–2019 | FIFA listed (Australia) | Referee |
| 2023– | FIFA listed (England) | Referee |

Jarred Gavan Gillett (born 1 November 1986) is an Australian soccer referee. He has been a referee in the Premier League, the top flight of the English football pyramid, since his promotion to the Select Group referees list in August 2021.

From 2013 to 2019, Gillett was a FIFA-listed referee representing Football Federation Australia. After relocating to England in 2019, he began officiating there and returned to the FIFA list in 2023, this time representing the Football Association.

== Early life ==
Jarred Gavan Gillett was born on 1 November 1986 on the Gold Coast in Queensland, Australia.

== Career ==
Gillett has refereed five Hyundai A-League Grand Finals (2012, 2015, 2016, 2017, 2018) and has been named the Hyundai A-League Referee of the Year on five occasions (2011–12, 2014–15, 2015–16, 2016–17 and 2017–18).

He refereed the October 2009 National Youth League Grand Final. He was part of the Asian Football Confederation Project Future referees program and visited the Premier League in England in 2010 with the AFC.

Gillett made his A-League debut during the 2010–11 A-League season, officiating in 15 matches, including the elimination semi-final between Adelaide United and Wellington Phoenix.

In November 2016, Gillett was approached by ASEAN Football Federation to officiate in the 2016 AFF Championship first leg of the semi-finals match between Indonesia and Vietnam in Bogor.

In April 2017, he was appointed as one of the inaugural video assistant referees (VARs) in the A-League (the first top-tier football league in the world to implement the technology).

When Gillett was awarded the Hyundai A-League Referee of the Year award in 2016–17 for a record fourth time; this made him the most successful referee in A-League history.

The 2018 A-League Grand Final between Newcastle Jets and Melbourne Victory was his fifth time, and fourth consecutive appearance, refereeing the Grand Final. In October 2018, Gillett refereed the 2018 FFA Cup Final between Adelaide United and Sydney FC.

He has also officiated in the J-League (as part of an exchange program), the Indian Super League, the Chinese Super League and the Saudi Professional League and at the 2015 International Champions Cup.

Gillett joined Select Group 2 in England at the start of the 2019–20 season after taking up a post-doctoral research position at Liverpool John Moores University.

On 15 April 2019, Gillett was selected to take charge of his first fixture in the EFL. He was chosen to officiate the EFL League Two match between Morecambe and Cheltenham Town on 22 April 2019. Gillett officiated his first Championship match, Blackburn Rovers v Swansea City, on the final day of the 2018–19 season.

On 24 September 2019, he officiated an EFL Cup game. He refereed the match between Colchester United and Tottenham Hotspur.

Gillett also took charge of the second leg of the 2020–21 EFL Championship play-off semi-final between Brentford and AFC Bournemouth.

On 22 June 2021, Gillett was selected with three other referees to be promoted to the Select Group 1, allowing him to officiate Premier League games from the 2021–22 Premier League season onwards.

On 25 September 2021, he became the first person born outside of the British Isles and the second person born outside of the United Kingdom to referee a Premier League game, taking charge of a 1–1 draw between Watford and Newcastle United. (Note: Irish-born Dermot Gallagher was a Premier League referee from 1992 to 2007.)

== Personal life ==
Gillett is married to Michelle Tobin, a former Brisbane Roar FC media officer.

In December 2018, Gillett graduated with a Doctor of Philosophy in biomechanics from The University of Queensland and led a world-first clinical trial investigating exercise training for children with cerebral palsy.

== Statistics ==
=== Australia ===
As of 9 September 2021

| Season | Games | Total (yellow card) | (yellow card) per game | Total (red card) | (red card) per game |
|---|---|---|---|---|---|
| 2010–11 | 14 | – | – | – | – |
| 2011–12 | 24 | – | – | – | – |
| 2012–13 | 18 | – | – | – | – |
| 2013–14 | 14 | – | – | – | – |
| 2014–15 | 14 | 70 | 5.00 | 4 | 0.36 |
| 2015–16 | 21 | 101 | 4.81 | 2 | 0.10 |
| 2016–17 | 17 | 96 | 5.65 | 7 | 0.41 |
| 2017–18 | 21 | 85 | 4.05 | 4 | 0.19 |
| 2018–19 | 16 | 64 | 4.00 | 4 | 0.25 |
| Total (Note: Totals for 2014–15 onwards due to lack records.) | 159 | 416 | 4.67 | 21 | 0.24 |

=== England ===
As of 16 May 2024

| Season | Games | Total (yellow card) | (yellow card) per game | Total (red card) | (red card) per game |
|---|---|---|---|---|---|
| 2018–19 | 3 | 12 | 4.00 | 0 | 0.00 |
| 2019–20 | 29 | 95 | 3.28 | 2 | 0.07 |
| 2020–21 | 32 | 102 | 3.19 | 3 | 0.09 |
| 2021–22 | 22 | 57 | 2.59 | 5 | 0.23 |
| 2022–23 | 26 | 74 | 2.85 | 2 | 0.08 |
| 2023–24 | 30 | 128 | 4.27 | 3 | 0.10 |
| Total | 142 | 468 | 3.30 | 15 | 0.11 |

=== International ===
As of 9 September 2021

| Season | Games | Total (yellow card) | (yellow card) per game | Total (red card) | (red card) per game |
|---|---|---|---|---|---|
| 2018 | 1 | 2 | 2.00 | 0 | 0.00 |
| Total | 1 | 2 | 2.00 | 0 | 0.00 |
