= Jordan Bos =

Australian soccer player (born 2002)

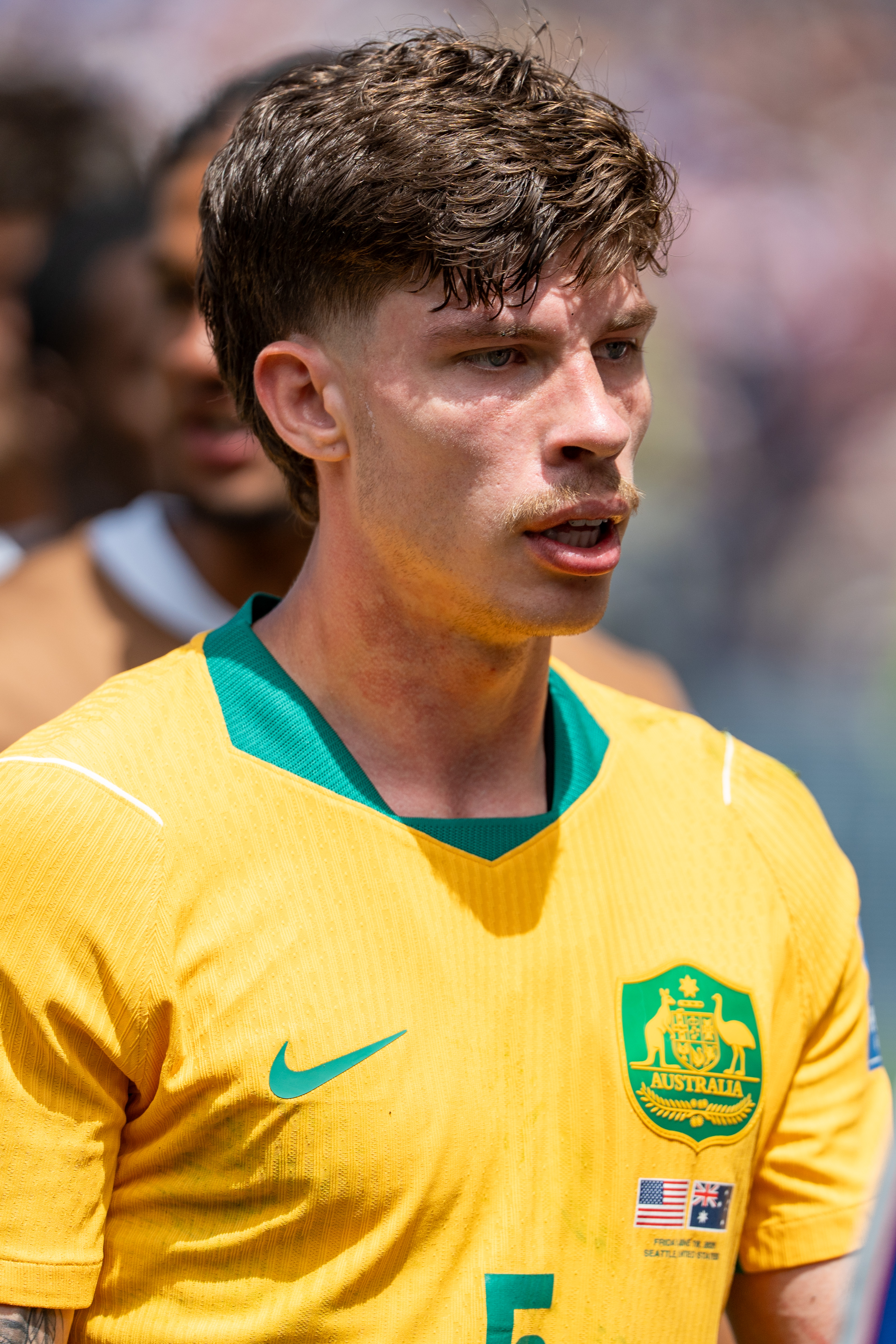
- Bos with Australia in 2026

Personal information
- Full name: Jordan Jacob Bos
- Date of birth: 29 October 2002 (age 24)
- Place of birth: Melbourne, Victoria, Australia
- Height: 1.83 m (6 ft 0 in)
- Position: Left back

Team information
- Current team: Feyenoord
- Number: 15

Youth career
- Hoppers Crossing
- Point Cook
- 2016–2019: Melbourne City

Senior career*
Years	Team	Apps	(Gls)
2018–2023	Melbourne City NPL	37	(2)
2020–2023	Melbourne City	41	(3)
2023–2025	Westerlo	44	(7)
2025–	Feyenoord	28	(4)

International career^{‡}
2018	Australia U17	2	(0)
2021	Australia U20	2	(0)
2022–	Australia U23	4	(0)
2023–	Australia	31	(4)
- * Club domestic league appearances and goals as of 21 May 2026 ‡ National team caps and goals as of 3 July 2026

Jordan Jacob Bos (born 29 October 2002) is an Australian professional soccer player who plays as a left back for Eredivisie side Feyenoord and the Australia national team.

== Early life ==
Bos grew up in the Melbourne suburb of Point Cook and played junior football for Hoppers Crossing SC. He went to primary school at Lumen Christi Catholic Primary School in Point Cook and secondary school at the Point Cook campus of Emmanuel College. He is of Dutch descent, and is the older brother of Excelsior Rotterdam player Kasey Bos.

== Club career ==
=== Melbourne City ===
In September 2021, Bos signed his first professional contract with Melbourne City on a three-year deal. Bos made his first-team debut for City on 27 November 2021 as a substitute in a 2–2 draw to Adelaide United at Coopers Stadium. He scored his first professional goal on 6 April 2022, opening the score in a 4–0 win over Sydney FC. Bos was a part of Melbourne City's campaign in the 2021–22 season and 2022–23 season, where he claimed two A-League Men’s Premierships in 50 appearances, including three goals and six assists, for the club.

=== KVC Westerlo ===
On 16 May 2023, it was announced that Bos would join Belgian Pro League side Westerlo at the end of the 2022–23 season, signing a four-year contract with his new club. While the transfer fee was kept undisclosed, it was reported that the deal broke the previous records both for Melbourne City (originally set by Aaron Mooy in 2016) and for any A-League club (which had belonged to Zeljko Kalac since 1995). Bos' record as the most expensive transfer domestic player in Australia stood until June 2023, when former teammate Marco Tilio was sold to Celtic from City for a record undisclosed fee.

=== Feyenoord ===
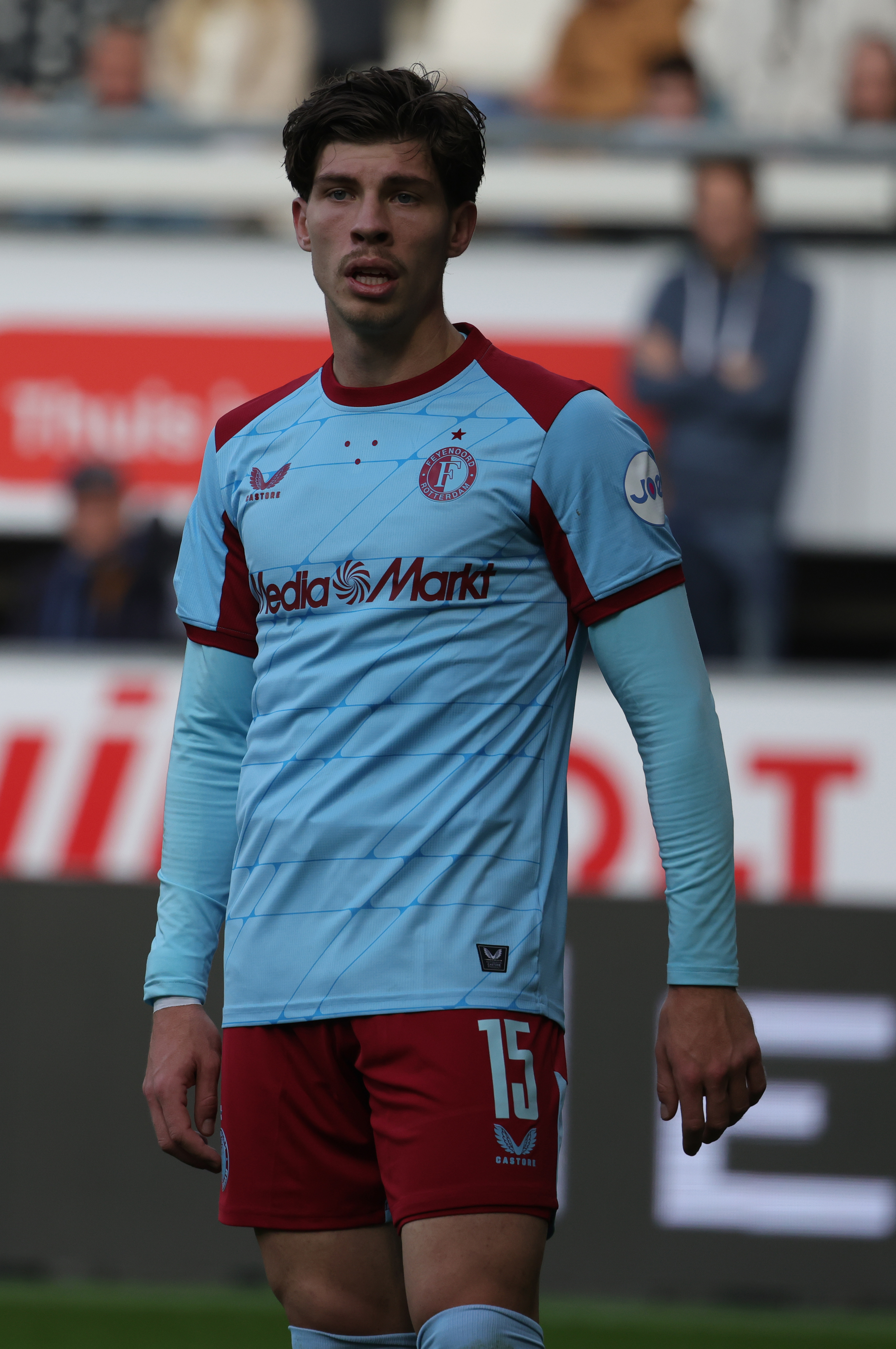
Bos with Feyenoord in 2025

On 25 July 2025, Bos moved to Dutch side Feyenoord on a four-year contract.

He made his first competitive start against Fenerbahçe in a UEFA Champions League Qualifier, assisting a 91st minute winner from Anis Hadj Moussa. Bos’ first goal for the club came on 31 August, being the opener in a 4–0 away win vs Sparta Rotterdam. His good form continued, as he scored from outside the box against AZ Alkmaar in a 3–3 draw on 21 September. This run would constitute his best start to a season, with 4 goal involvements in his first 6 games. He was later named the Eredivisie Player of the Month for the month of September, becoming the first Australian to win the award.

== International career ==
Bos made his international debut for Australia in a friendly against Ecuador at Docklands Stadium on 28 March 2023. He scored his first goal against India in their 2–0 win at the 2023 AFC Asian Cup on 13 January 2024.

In the second round of 2026 FIFA World Cup qualification, Bos assisted in each of Australia's matches against Bangladesh.

After injuring his hamstring playing domestically, Bos missed two matches in Australia's 2026 FIFA World Cup qualification, sitting on the sidelines for matches against Bahrain and Indonesia in September 2024. He returned for a 3–1 victory over China in October.

On 31 May 2026, Bos was selected in the 26-man squad for the 2026 FIFA World Cup and was recorded with the top speed of 36.7km/h.

== Career statistics ==
=== Club ===
As of match played 17 May 2026

Appearances and goals by club, season and competition
Club	Season	League			National cup (Note: Includes Australia Cup, Belgian Cup)		Continental		Total	
Club	Season	Division	Apps	Goals	Apps	Goals	Apps	Goals	Apps	Goals
Melbourne City FC	2020-21	A-League Men	0	0	1	0	0	0	1	0
Melbourne City FC	2021–22	A-League Men	13	1	2	0	6 (Note: Appearances in AFC Champions League)	0	21	1
Melbourne City FC	2022–23	A-League Men	28	2	0	0	0	0	28	2
Melbourne City FC	Total		41	3	3	0	6	0	50	3
K.V.C. Westerlo	2023–24	Belgian Pro League	26	3	1	0	5 (Note: Appearances in Conference League Qualifiers)	1	32	4
K.V.C. Westerlo	2024–25	Belgian Pro League	18	4	1	0	—		19	4
K.V.C. Westerlo	Total		44	7	2	0	5	1	51	8
Feyenoord	2025–26	Eredivisie	28	4	0	0	7 (Note: Two appearances in UEFA Champions League, five appearances in UEFA Europa League)	0	35	4
Career total			113	14	5	0	18	1	136	15

=== International ===
As of match played 3 July 2026

Appearances and goals by national team and year
National team	Year	Apps	Goals
Australia	2023	6	0
Australia	2024	13	1
Australia	2025	4	1
Australia	2026	8	2
Total		31	4

Scores and results list Australia's goal tally first.

No.	Date	Venue	Cap	Opponent	Score	Result	Competition
1	13 January 2024	Ahmad bin Ali Stadium, Al Rayyan, Qatar	8	India	2–0	2–0	2023 AFC Asian Cup
2	14 October 2025	Dick's Sporting Goods Park, Commerce City, United States	23	United States	1–0	1–2	Friendly
3	27 March 2026	Accor Stadium, Sydney, Australia	24	Cameroon	1–0	1–0	2026 FIFA Series
4	30 March 2026	Melbourne Rectangular Stadium, Melbourne, Australia	25	Curaçao	3–1	5–1	2026 FIFA Series

== Honours ==
Melbourne City

- A-League Premiership: 2021–22, 2022–23

Individual

- PFA A-League Team of the Season: 2022–23
- A-League Men Young Footballer of the Year: 2022–23
- PFA Harry Kewell Medal: 2022–23
- Eredivisie Player of the Month: September 2025
- PFA Men's Footballer of the Year: 2025–26
