= Professional Footballers Australia =

Trade union

PFA
- Professional Footballers Australia
- Founded: April 1993
- Headquarters: Melbourne, Victoria
- Location: Australia
- Members: 655 (2020)
- Key people: Alex Wilkinson (President); Kathryn Gill (Co-Chief Executive); Beau Busch (Co-Chief Executive)
- Affiliations: ACTU, FIFPro
- Website: pfa.net.au

The Professional Footballers Australia (PFA), formerly the Australian Soccer Players' Association, is an Australian trade union affiliated with the Australian Council of Trade Unions and FIFPRO that represents professional male, female and elite junior soccer players.

== History ==
Before the PFA, eight previous attempts had been made to form a footballers' association in Australia. The PFA was formed in April 1993 as the Australian Soccer Players' Association.

In 1994, the PFA won a standardised contract for footballers, and through the Australian Industrial Relations Commission won the abolition of a transfer system much hated by Australian footballers.

Since the mid-1990s, the PFA has been active in advancing soccer players' pay and conditions, and has also been active in protecting soccer player's from unfair dismissal. It is a member of FIFPro.

== Awards ==
The PFA holds an annual award ceremony, which formally recognises the most outstanding Australian footballers.

== See also ==
- Soccer in Australia
- Football Australia
