= 2020–21 in Australian soccer =

52nd season of national competitive soccer in Australia

Soccer in Australia
- Season: 2020–21

Men's soccer
- A-League Premiership: Melbourne City
- A-League Championship: Melbourne City
- FFA Cup: None

Women's soccer
- W-League Premiership: Sydney FC
- W-League Championship: Melbourne Victory

The 2020–21 season was the 52nd season of national competitive soccer in Australia and 138th overall.

Several events from March 2020 onwards were disrupted or postponed due to impacts from the COVID-19 pandemic in Australia.

== National teams ==
=== Australia men's national soccer team ===
==== 2022 FIFA World Cup qualification / 2023 AFC Asian Cup qualification ====
===== Second round =====
3 June 2021 Group B	Australia	3–0	Kuwait	Kuwait City, Kuwait
21:30 UTC+3	Leckie 1'; Irvine 24'; Hrustic 66'	Report		Stadium: Jaber Al-Ahmad International Stadium; Attendance: 0 (Note: Due to the COVID-19 pandemic in Kuwait, the match was played behind closed doors.); Referee: Jumpei Iida (Japan)

7 June 2021 Group B	Australia	5–1	Chinese Taipei	Kuwait City, Kuwait
19:30 UTC+3	Souttar 12'; Maclaren 27' (pen.); Sainsbury 41'; Duke 46', 84'	Report	Gao Wei-jie 62'	Stadium: Jaber Al-Ahmad International Stadium; Attendance: 0 Referee: Saoud Al-Adba (Qatar)

11 June 2021 Group B	Nepal	0–3	Australia	Kuwait City, Kuwait
19:30 UTC+3		Report	Leckie 6'; Karacic 38'; Boyle 57'	Stadium: Al Kuwait Sports Club Stadium; Attendance: 0 Referee: Ahmed Al-Kaf (Oman)

15 June 2021 Group B	Australia	1–0	Jordan	Kuwait City, Kuwait
19:30 UTC+3	Souttar 77'	Report		Stadium: Jaber Al-Ahmad International Stadium; Attendance: 0 Referee: Kim Woo-Sung (South Korea)

=== Men's under 23 ===
==== Friendlies ====
The following is a list of friendlies played by the men's under 23 national team in 2020–21.

12 November 2020	Sydney FC (Australia)	3–0	Australia	Sydney, Australia
19:00 AEDT	Retre 5'; Buhagiar 15'; Baumjohann 18'	Report		Stadium: Jubilee Oval

17 November 2020	Macarthur FC (Australia)	1–2	Australia	Sydney, Australia
15:00 AEDT	La. Rose 67'	Report	Metcalfe 78'; Najjarine 79'	Stadium: Jubilee Oval; Attendance: 0

2 June 2021	Australia	1–2	Republic of Ireland U-21	Marbella, Spain
13:00 UTC+2	Najjarine 72'	Report	Rich-Baghuelou 57' (o.g.); Tierney 90'	Stadium: Marbella Football Centre; Referee: Parejo Nieto (Spain)

5 June 2021	Australia	Cancelled	Saudi Arabia	Marbella, Spain
14:00 UTC+2		Cancellation		Stadium: Estadio Municipal de Marbella

8 June 2021	Australia	0–1	Romania	Marbella, Spain
20:00 UTC+2		Report	Ganea 9'	Stadium: Estadio Municipal de Marbella

12 June 2021	Australia	2–3	Mexico	Marbella, Spain
20:00 UTC+2	Arzani 32', 50'	Report	Angulo 33'; Álvarez 59'; Ed. Aguirre 78'	Stadium: Estadio Municipal de Marbella

=== Men's under-20 ===
==== Friendly ====
20 December 2020	Central Coast Mariners (Australia)	Cancelled	Australia	Gosford, Australia
		Report		Stadium: Central Coast Stadium

==== AFC U-19 Championship ====
The 2020 AFC U-19 Championship was cancelled after the draw for the group stage was conducted.

March 2021 Group stage	Australia	Cancelled	Vietnam	Namangan, Uzbekistan
		Source		Stadium: Navbahor Central Stadium

March 2021 Group stage	Laos	Cancelled	Australia	Namangan, Uzbekistan
		Source		Stadium: Navbahor Central Stadium

March 2021 Group stage	Saudi Arabia	Cancelled	Australia	Tashkent, Uzbekistan
		Source		Stadium: Lokomotiv Stadium

=== Men's under-17 ===
==== AFC U-16 Championship ====
The 2020 AFC U-16 Championship was cancelled after the draw for the group stage was conducted.

2021 Group stage	Australia	Cancelled	India	Riffa, Bahrain
		Source		Stadium: Bahrain National Stadium

2021 Group stage	Uzbekistan	Cancelled	Australia	Muharraq, Bahrain
		Source		Stadium: Sheikh Ali Bin Mohammed Al Khalifa Stadium

2021 Group stage	South Korea	Cancelled	Australia	Riffa, Bahrain
		Source		Stadium: Bahrain National Stadium

=== Australia women's national soccer team ===
==== Friendlies ====
The following is a list of friendlies played by the women's senior national team in 2020–21.

10 April 2021	Germany	5–2	Australia	Wiesbaden, Germany
16:10	Nüsken 11'; Hendrich 48'; Brand 62'; Freigang 64'; Dallmann 90+1'	Report	Gielnik 82', 90+2'	Stadium: Brita-Arena; Referee: Marta Frías Acedo (Spain)

13 April 2021	Netherlands	5–0	Australia	Nijmegen, Netherlands
18:30 CEST	Roord 5'; Martens 20'; Groenen 27'; Beerensteyn 67'; van de Donk 70'	Report		Stadium: Stadion de Goffert; Referee: Esther Staubli (Switzerland)

10 June 2021	Denmark	3–2	Australia	Horsens, Denmark
18:00 CEST	Yallop 15' (o.g.); Sevecke 21'; Arnold 25' (o.g.)	Report	Fowler 87'; Polkinghorne 90+2'	Stadium: CASA Arena; Referee: Lina Lehtovaara (Finland)

15 June 2021	Sweden	0–0	Australia	Kalmar, Sweden
18:45 CEST		Report		Stadium: Guldfågeln Arena; Referee: Ivana Martinčić (Croatia)

== AFC competitions ==
=== AFC Champions League ===
All three teams that qualified for the 2021 AFC Champions League – Sydney FC, Melbourne City and Brisbane Roar – withdrew from the competition after the draw.

== Men's football ==
=== A-League ===
Pos	Team	Pld	W	D	L	GF	GA	GD	Pts	Qualification
1	Melbourne City (C)	26	15	4	7	57	32	+25	49	Qualification for 2022 AFC Champions League group stage and finals series (Note: The top two teams entered the finals series at the semi-finals, while the teams ranked third to sixth entered the finals series at the elimination-finals.)
2	Sydney FC	26	13	8	5	39	23	+16	47	Qualification for 2022 AFC Champions League qualifying play-offs and finals series
3	Central Coast Mariners	26	12	6	8	35	31	+4	42	Qualification for finals series
4	Brisbane Roar	26	11	7	8	36	28	+8	40	Qualification for finals series
5	Adelaide United	26	11	6	9	39	41	−2	39	Qualification for finals series
6	Macarthur FC	26	11	6	9	33	36	−3	39	Qualification for finals series
7	Wellington Phoenix (Note: Wellington Phoenix cannot qualify for Asian Football Confederation competitions as they are based in New Zealand, which is under the Oceania Football Confederation.)	26	10	8	8	44	34	+10	38	
8	Western Sydney Wanderers	26	9	8	9	45	43	+2	35	
9	Perth Glory	26	9	7	10	44	44	0	34	Qualification for 2021 FFA Cup play-offs (Note: The top 8 teams qualified for the round of 32, while the bottom four teams participated in a playoff round.)
10	Western United	26	8	4	14	30	47	−17	28	Qualification for 2021 FFA Cup play-offs
11	Newcastle Jets	26	5	6	15	24	38	−14	21	Qualification for 2021 FFA Cup play-offs
12	Melbourne Victory	26	5	4	17	31	60	−29	19	Qualification for 2022 AFC Champions League qualifying play-offs and 2021 FFA Cup play-offs (Note: Qualified as the 2021 FFA Cup winners.)

Source: A-Leagues
Rules for classification: 1) Points; 2) Goal difference; 3) Goals scored; 4) Least red cards; 5) Least yellow cards; 6) Toss of a coin in an event of a tie of two clubs.
(C) Champions
Notes:

Finals

Elimination-finals
12 June – Gosford
Central Coast Mariners	0
Macarthur FC	2
13 June – Brisbane
Brisbane Roar	1
Adelaide United	2

Semi-finals
20 June – Sydney
Melbourne City	2
Macarthur FC	0
19 June – Sydney
Sydney FC	2
Adelaide United	1

Grand Final
27 June – Melbourne
Melbourne City	3
Sydney FC	1

=== National Premier Leagues ===
The competition in all member federations was suspended, effective from 18 March, due to the impacts from the COVID-19 pandemic in Australia. Apart from Victoria, competitions resumed in the various member federations between late June and late July. It was announced on 3 July that the finals series for the 2020 competition had been cancelled.

=== Cup competitions ===
==== FFA Cup ====
The competition was suspended for one month due to the impacts from the COVID-19 pandemic in Australia, effective 18 March, and cancelled on 3 July, although the associated Lakoseljac Cup competition in Tasmania recommenced in July.

== Women's football ==
=== W-League ===
Pos	Team	Pld	W	D	L	GF	GA	GD	Pts	Qualification
1	Sydney FC	12	9	1	2	26	11	+15	28	Qualification to Finals series
2	Brisbane Roar	12	7	4	1	29	12	+17	25	Qualification to Finals series
3	Melbourne Victory (C)	12	7	2	3	25	14	+11	23	Qualification to Finals series
4	Canberra United	12	6	4	2	21	16	+5	22	Qualification to Finals series
5	Adelaide United	12	7	1	4	22	18	+4	22	
6	Western Sydney Wanderers	12	4	1	7	13	21	−8	13	
7	Melbourne City	12	4	1	7	11	23	−12	13	
8	Newcastle Jets	12	2	1	9	14	21	−7	7	
9	Perth Glory	12	0	1	11	7	32	−25	1	

Source: A-Leagues
Rules for classification: 1) points; 2) goal difference; 3) number of goals scored.
(C) Champions

== New clubs ==
- A-League: Macarthur FC

== Deaths ==
- 12 January 2021: Frank Arok, 88, Australian head coach from 1983 to 1989.
- 26 January 2021: Jozef Vengloš, 84, Australian head coach in 1967.
- January 2021: Frank Parsons, Australian striker.
- 9 March 2021: Alan Marnoch, 77, Australian and Sydney Hakoah defender.
- 29 March 2021: Bill Murphy, Australian footballer.
- 23 May 2021: Alan Garside, Australian and Granville Kewpies striker.

== Retirements ==
- 12 July 2020: Mile Jedinak, 35, former Australia, Sydney United, and Central Coast Mariners midfielder.
- 10 August 2020: Oriol Riera, 34, former Western Sydney Wanderers forward.
- 12 August 2020: Pirmin Schwegler, 33, former Switzerland and Western Sydney Wanderers midfielder.
- 26 August 2020: Daniel Bowles, 28, former Gold Coast United, Adelaide United, and Brisbane Roar defender.
- 9 October 2020: Chris Harold, 28, former Gold Coast United, Perth Glory, and Central Coast Mariners forward.
- 16 December 2020: Archie Thompson, 42, former Australia, Gippsland Falcons, Carlton, Marconi Stallions, and Melbourne Victory forward.
- December 2020: Rashid Mahazi, 28, former Melbourne Victory and Western Sydney Wanderers midfielder.
- 25 March 2021: Rhali Dobson, 28, former Australia, Newcastle Jets, and Melbourne City forward.
- 5 June 2021: Andrew Durante, 39, former New Zealand, Sydney Olympic, Parramatta Power, Newcastle Jets, Wellington Phoenix, Sydney FC, and Western United defender.
- 11 June 2021: Nigel Boogaard, 34, former Newcastle Jets, Central Coast Mariners, and Adelaide United defender.
- 20 June 2021: Mark Milligan, 35, former Australia, Northern Spirit, Sydney FC, Newcastle Jets, Melbourne Victory, and Macarthur FC defender and midfielder.
- 29 June 2021: Beñat Etxebarria, 34, former Spain and Macarthur FC midfielder.
- 29 June 2021: Markel Susaeta, 33, former Spain, Melbourne City, and Macarthur FC midfielder.
