= 2011–12 in Australian soccer =

Soccer in Australia
- Season: 2011–12

Men's soccer
- A-League Premiership: Central Coast Mariners
- A-League Championship: Brisbane Roar
- National Youth League: Central Coast Mariners

Women's soccer
- W-League Premiership: Canberra United
- W-League Championship: Canberra United

The 2011–12 season was the 43rd season of national competitive soccer in Australia and 129th overall.

== Domestic leagues ==
=== A-League ===
The 2011–12 A-League began on 8 October 2011 and ended on 22 April 2012.

==== Regular season ====
Pos	Team	Pld	W	D	L	GF	GA	GD	Pts	Qualification
1	Central Coast Mariners	27	15	6	6	40	24	+16	51	Qualification for 2013 AFC Champions League group stage and finals series (Note: First place qualifies for the 2013 AFC Champions League group stage. Winning the 2012 A-League Grand Final automatically earns qualification for the 2013 AFC Champions League qualifying play-off, unless first place are champions.)
2	Brisbane Roar (C)	27	14	7	6	50	28	+22	49	Qualification for 2013 AFC Champions League qualifying play-off and finals series
3	Perth Glory	27	13	4	10	40	35	+5	43	Qualification for Finals series
4	Wellington Phoenix	27	12	4	11	34	32	+2	40	Qualification for Finals series
5	Sydney FC	27	10	8	9	37	42	−5	38	Qualification for Finals series
6	Melbourne Heart	27	9	10	8	35	34	+1	37	Qualification for Finals series
7	Newcastle Jets	27	10	5	12	38	41	−3	35	
8	Melbourne Victory	27	6	11	10	35	43	−8	29	
9	Adelaide United	27	5	10	12	26	44	−18	25	
10	Gold Coast United	27	4	9	14	30	42	−12	21	

Source: ultimatealeague.com
Rules for classification: 1) points; 2) goal difference; 3) number of goals scored.
(C) Champions

==== Finals ====
Elimination finals
3	Perth Glory	3
6	Melbourne Heart	0
4	Wellington Phoenix	3
5	Sydney FC	2

Semifinals
1	Central Coast Mariners	0	2
2	Brisbane Roar	2	3
Perth Glory	3
Wellington Phoenix	2

Preliminary final
Central Coast Mariners	1 (3)
Perth Glory (pen.)	1 (5)

Grand final
Brisbane Roar	2
Perth Glory	1

=== W-League ===
The 2011–12 W-League began on 22 October 2011 and ended on 28 January 2012.

==== Regular season ====
Pos	Team	Pld	W	D	L	GF	GA	GD	Pts	Qualification
1	Canberra United (C)	10	7	3	0	23	9	+14	24	Qualification to Finals series
2	Brisbane Roar	10	6	3	1	20	11	+9	21	Qualification to Finals series
3	Sydney FC	10	5	2	3	26	8	+18	17	Qualification to Finals series
4	Melbourne Victory	10	5	2	3	21	9	+12	17	Qualification to Finals series
5	Newcastle Jets	10	4	0	6	18	22	−4	12	
6	Perth Glory	10	2	0	8	11	36	−25	6	
7	Adelaide United	10	1	0	9	6	30	−24	3	

Source: au.soccerway.com
Rules for classification: 1) points; 2) goal difference; 3) number of goals scored.
(C) Champions

==== Finals ====
Semifinals
1	Canberra United	1
4	Melbourne Victory	0
2	Brisbane Roar (p)	1 (4)
3	Sydney FC	1 (3)

Finals
1	Canberra United	3
2	Brisbane Roar	2

== International club competitions ==
=== AFC Champions League ===
The 2012 AFC Champions League began on 10 February 2012 and ended on 10 November 2012. Brisbane Roar qualified after winning the 2011 A-League Grand Final, Central Coast Mariners after coming second in the 2010–11 A-League and Adelaide United, after coming third, entered in the qualifying stages.

==== Adelaide United ====
16 February 2012 Qualifying final round	Adelaide United (Australia)	3–0	(Indonesia) Persipura Jayapura	Adelaide, Australia
19:30	Boogaard 12'; Levchenko 57' van Dijk 84'	AFC Preview; AFC Report; Club Report; Summary		Stadium: Hindmarsh Stadium; Attendance: 5,013; Referee: Masaaki Toma (Japan)

6 March 2012 Group stage	Bunyodkor (Uzbekistan)	1–2	(Australia) Adelaide United	Tashkent, Uzbekistan
22:30	Murzoev 90+4'	AFC Report; Club Report; Summary	12' Boogaard; 53' Golec	Stadium: JAR Stadium; Attendance: 7,000; Referee: Andre El Haddad (Lebanon)

20 March 2012 Group stage	Adelaide United (Australia)	2–0	(Japan) Gamba Osaka	Adelaide, Australia
Tuesday 19:30	Mullen 14', 21'	AFC Report; Club Report; Summary		Stadium: Hindmarsh Stadium; Attendance: 5,112; Referee: Mohamed Abdelkarim Mohamed Ismail Alzarooni (United Arab Emirates)

3 April 2012 Group stage	Pohang Steelers (South Korea)	1–0	(Australia) Adelaide United	Pohang, South Korea
20:30	Dae-Ho 68'	AFC Report; Club Report; Summary		Stadium: Steelyard Stadium; Attendance: 2,833; Referee: Khalil Al Ghamdi (Saudi Arabia)

18 April 2012 Group stage	Adelaide United (Australia)	1–0	(South Korea) Pohang Steelers	Adelaide, Australia
19:30	Djite 90'	AFC Report; Club Report; Summary		Stadium: Hindmarsh Stadium; Attendance: 7,659; Referee: Hai Tan ()

2 May 2012 Group stage	Adelaide United (Australia)	0–0	(Uzbekistan) Bunyodkor	Adelaide, Australia
19:30		AFC Report; Club Report; Summary		Stadium: Hindmarsh Stadium; Attendance: 7,794; Referee: Liu Kwok Man (Hong Kong)

16 May 2012 Group stage	Gamba Osaka (Japan)	0–2	(Australia) Adelaide United	Suita, Japan
19:30		AFC Report; Club Report; Summary	65' van Dijk; 88' (o.g.) Sato	Stadium: Osaka Expo '70 Stadium; Attendance: 7,294; Referee: Nawaf Shukrulla (Bahrain)

29 May 2012 Round of 16	Adelaide United (Australia)	1–0	(Japan) Nagoya Grampus	Adelaide, Australia
19:30	McKain 42'	AFC Report; Club Report; Summary		Stadium: Hindmarsh Stadium; Attendance: 9,758; Referee: Malik Abdul Bashir (Singapore)

19 September 2012 Quarter-final First Leg	Adelaide United (Australia)	2–2	(Uzbekistan) Bunyodkor	Adelaide, Australia
19:30	Ramsay 8'; Kostopoulos 18'; Boogaard (red card) 42'	AFC Report; Club Report; Summary	44' Hasanov; 75' Salomov	Stadium: Hindmarsh Stadium; Attendance: 10,366; Referee: Abdullah Al Hilali (Oman)

3 October 2012 Quarter-final Second Leg	Bunyodkor (Uzbekistan)	3–2 (a.e.t.) (5–4 agg.)	(Australia) Adelaide United	Tashkent, Uzbekistan
23:30	Turaev 20'; Shorakhmedov 67'; Gafurov (yellow card) 88' (yellow-red card) 100'; Rakhmatullaev 104'	AFC Report; Club Report; Summary	4' Ramsay; 62' (yellow card) 112' Jerónimo; (yellow card) 69' (yellow-red card) 88' Barbiero; (yellow card) 85' (yellow-red card) 120' Fyfe	Stadium: JAR Stadium; Attendance: 7,212; Referee: Ali Abdulnabi (Bahrain)

==== Brisbane Roar ====
6 March 2012 Group stage	Brisbane Roar (Australia)	0–2	(Japan) FC Tokyo	Brisbane, Australia
19:30 UTC+10		(Report) (Summary)	Yazawa 45+1'; Hasegawa 55'	Stadium: Suncorp Stadium; Attendance: 12,037; Referee: Kovalenko Valentin (Uzbekistan

20 March 2012 Group stage	Beijing Guoan (China)	1–1	(Australia) Brisbane Roar	Beijing, China
19:30 UTC+08:00	Cheng 8'	(Report) (Summary)	Nichols 21'	Stadium: Workers Stadium; Attendance: 41,000; Referee: Abdulrahman Mohammed Hussain (Qatar)

4 April 2012 Group stage	Ulsan Hyundai (South Korea)	1–1	(Australia) Brisbane Roar	Ulsan, South Korea
19:30 UTC+09:00	Jae-Seong 54'; Keun-Ho (penalty missed) 48' (pen.)	(Report) (Summary)	Fitzgerald 36'; Jurman (red card) 47'	Stadium: Ulsan Munsu Football Stadium; Attendance: 1,673; Referee: Andre El Haddad (Lebanon)

17 April 2012 Group stage	Brisbane Roar (Australia)	1–2	(South Korea) Ulsan Hyundai	Brisbane, Australia
19:30 UTC+10	Stefanutto 25'	Report; Summary	Vélez 11'; Tae-Hwi 73' (pen.)	Stadium: Suncorp Stadium; Attendance: 7,015; Referee: Mohsen Torky (Iran)

2 May 2012 Group stage	FC Tokyo (Japan)	4–2	(Australia) Brisbane Roar	Tokyo, Japan
19:30 UTC+09:00	Takahashi 5'; Mukuhara 20'; Watanabe 44'; Watanabe 60'	[ (Report)] (Summary)	Berisha 4'; Broich 33'	Stadium: National Olympic Stadium; Attendance: 8,492; Referee: Abdullah Balideh (Qatar)

16 May 2012 Group stage	Brisbane Roar (Australia)	1–1	(China) Beijing Guoan	Brisbane, Australia
19:30 UTC+10	Berisha 15'	Report; Summary	Li Hanbo 34'	Stadium: Suncorp Stadium; Attendance: 5,615; Referee: Ali Al Badwawi (United Arab Emirates)

==== Central Coast Mariners ====
7 March 2012 Group stage	Tianjin Teda FC (China)	0–0	(Australia) Central Coast Mariners	Tianjin, China
23:00		Report		Stadium: TEDA Football Stadium; Attendance: 19,800; Referee: Abdullah Al Hilali (Oman

21 March 2012 Group stage	Central Coast Mariners (Australia)	1–1	(Japan) Nagoya Grampus	Gosford, Australia
19:30	Tulio Tanaka 21'	Report	Patrick Zwaanswijk 28'	Stadium: Central Coast Stadium; Attendance: 5,130; Referee: Liu Kwok Man (Hong Kong)

3 April 2012 Group stage	Central Coast Mariners (Australia)	1–1	(South Korea) Seongnam Ilhwa	Gosford, Australia
19:00	Adam Kwasnik 50'; Joshua Rose (red card) 61'	Report	Everton Santos 57'	Stadium: Central Coast Stadium; Attendance: 5,018; Referee: Valentin Kovalenko (Uzbekistan)

18 April 2012 Group stage	Seongnam Ilhwa (South Korea)	5–0	(Australia) Central Coast Mariners	Seongnam, South Korea
20:30	Lee Chang-Hoon 39'; Everton Santos 43', 73' (pen); Sung Hwan Kim 69'; Vladimir Jovancic 83'	Report		Stadium: Tancheon Sports Complex; Attendance: 2,017; Referee: Saeid Mozaffarizadeh (Iran)

1 May 2012 Group stage	Central Coast Mariners (Australia)	5–1	(China) Tianjin Teda FC	Gosford, Australia
19:30	Daniel McBreen 10', 20'; Joshua Rose 49'; Michael McGlinchey 71'; Mustafa Amini 85'	Report	Liao Bochao 72'	Stadium: Central Coast Stadium; Attendance: 4,155; Referee: Mohamed Al Zarouni (United Arab Emirates

15 May 2012 Group stage	Nagoya Grampus (Japan)	3–0	(Australia) Central Coast Mariners	Nagoya, Japan
20:00	Keiji Tamada 19'; Jungo Fujimoto 35'; Tulio Tanaka 87'	Report		Stadium: Mizuho Athletic Stadium; Attendance: 5,037; Referee: Abdulrahman Abdou (Qatar

== National teams ==
=== Men's senior ===
==== Friendlies ====
10 August 2011	Wales	1–2	Australia	Cardiff, Wales
19:45 (UTC+1)	Blake 82'	Report	Cahill 44'; Kruse 60'	Stadium: Cardiff City Stadium; Attendance: 7,500; Referee: Kristo Tohver (Estonia)

7 October 2011	Australia	5–0	Malaysia	Canberra, Australia
19:00	Wilkshire 3'; Kennedy 33', 45+1'; Brosque 39', 69'	Report		Stadium: Canberra Stadium; Attendance: 10, 041

2 June 2012	Denmark	2–0	Australia	Copenhagen, Denmark
23:00 UTC+8	Agger 31' (pen.); Bjelland 67'	Report; Summary		Stadium: Parken Stadium; Attendance: 15,888; Referee: Antonio Damato (Italy)

==== World Cup qualifying ====
2 September 2011 Third Round	Australia	2–1	Thailand	Brisbane, Australia
20:00 UTC+10	Kennedy 57'; Brosque 86'	Report; Summary	Dangda 15'	Stadium: Suncorp Stadium; Attendance: 24,540; Referee: Abdullah Dor Mohammed Balideh (Qatar)

6 September 2011 Third Round	Saudi Arabia	1–3	Australia	Dammam, Saudi Arabia
20:30 UTC+3	Al-Shamrani 65'	Report	Kennedy 40', 56'; Wilkshire 77' (pen.)	Stadium: Prince Mohamed bin Fahd Stadium; Attendance: 15,000; Referee: Yuichi Nishimura (Japan)

11 October 2011 Third Round	Australia	3–0	Oman	Sydney, Australia
19:30	Holman 7'; Kennedy 65'; Jednak 85'	Summary		Stadium: ANZ Stadium; Attendance: 24,732

11 November 2011 Third Round	Oman	1–0	Australia	Muscat, Oman
18.00 UTC+4	Hosni 18'	Report		Stadium: Sultan Qaboos Sports Complex; Attendance: 4,500; Referee: Ali Abdulnabi (Bahrain)

15 November 2011 Third Round	Thailand	0–1	Australia	Bangkok, Thailand
18:00 UTC+7		Report	Holman 78'	Stadium: Rajamangala Stadium; Attendance: 19,400; Referee: Saeid Mozaffarizadeh Iran

29 February 2012 Third Round	Australia	4–2	Saudi Arabia	Melbourne, Australia
17:30 UTC+8	Brosque 43', 75'; Kewell 73'; Emerton 76'	Report; Summary	Al-Dossari 19'; Al-Shamrani 45+2'	Stadium: AAMI Park; Attendance: 24,240; Referee: Dong-Jin Kim (South Korea)

8 June 2012 Fourth Round	Oman	0–0	Australia	Muscat, Oman
21:00 UTC+8		Report; Summary		Stadium: Sultan Qaboos Sports Complex; Attendance: 11,000; Referee: Alireza Faghani (Iran)

12 June 2012 Fourth Round	Australia	1–1	Japan	Brisbane, Australia
18:00 UTC+8	Milligan (yellow card) 25' (yellow-red card) 55'; Wilkshire 69' (pen.)	Report; Summary	Kurihara 64'; Kurihara (yellow card) 23' (yellow-red card) 89'	Stadium: Suncorp Stadium; Attendance: 40,189; Referee: Khalil Al Ghamdi (Saudi Arabia)

=== Men's under-23 ===
==== Friendlies ====
17 February 2012	Australia	1–0	Philippines	Dubai, United Arab Emirates
	Hoffman 9'	Report		Attendance: 4,000

==== Olympic qualifying ====
21 September 2011 Preliminary Round 3	Australia	0–0	United Arab Emirates	Adelaide, Australia
19:30 (UTC+9:30		Report		Stadium: Hindmarsh Stadium; Attendance: 2,390; Referee: Minoru Tōjō (Japan)

22 November 2011 Preliminary Round 3	Iraq	0–0	Australia	Doha, Qatar
17:15 (UTC+3		Report		Stadium: Al Arabi Stadium; Attendance: 200; Referee: Andre El Haddad (Lebanon)

27 November 2011 Preliminary Round 3	Australia	0–0	Uzbekistan	Sydney, Australia
19:15 (UTC+11)		Report		Stadium: Parramatta Stadium; Attendance: 2,604; Referee: Abdullah Al Hilali (Oman)

5 February 2012 Preliminary Round 3	Uzbekistan	2–0	Australia	Tashkent, Uzbekistan
15:00 (UTC+5)		Report		Stadium: JAR Stadium; Attendance: 4,527; Referee: Abdullah Balideh (Qatar)

22 February 2012 Preliminary Round 3	United Arab Emirates	1–0	Australia	Abu Dhabi, United Arab Emirates
17:30 (UTC+4)	O. Abdulrahman	Report		Stadium: Mohammed Bin Zayed Stadium; Attendance: 28,734; Referee: Lee Min-hu (South Korea)

14 March 2012 Preliminary Round 3	Australia	0–0	Iraq	Gosford, Australia
19:30 (UTC+11)		Report		Stadium: Central Coast Stadium; Attendance: 2,071; Referee: Yuichi Nishimura (Japan)

=== Men's under-20 ===
==== Friendlies ====
6 July 2011 Unofficial training match	Central Coast Mariners	1–1	Australia	Gosford, Australia
	Baird 54' (pen.)	Report	Petratos 56'	Stadium: Bluetongue Stadium; Attendance: 0 Referee: Kris Griffiths-Jones (Australia)

20 July 2011 Unofficial training match	Australia	1–1	South Korea	Denver, United States
	Ibini-Isei 38'	Report	Lee Ki-je 50'	Stadium: Regis University; Attendance: 0 Referee: Younes Marrakchi (United States)

22 July 2011 Unofficial training match	Australia	0–1	England	Denver, United States
		Report	Berahino 47'	Stadium: Dick's Sporting Goods Park; Attendance: 0 Referee: Younes Marrakchi (United States)

18 August 2011 SBS Cup	U-18 Shizuoka Selection Team	3–1	Australia	Fujieda, Japan
16:00 (UTC+9)	Shinmura Riku 40+2'; Kashiwase 55'; Kazama Kouya 66'	Report	Proia 73'	Stadium: Fujieda Football Stadium

20 August 2011 SBS Cup	Japan	1–0	Australia	Shizuoka, Japan
18:20 (UTC+9)	Minami 6'	Report		Stadium: Kusanagi Athletic Stadium

21 August 2011 SBS Cup	Australia	0–1	Mexico	Fukuroi, Japan
17:20 (UTC+9)		Report	Alejandro Leyva Espinoza 51'	Stadium: Ecopa Stadium

13 June 2012	Brisbane Strikers	3–1	Australia	Brisbane, Australia
19:00 (UTC+10)	Searle 55'; Maher 67'; Hews 75'	Report	Barker-Daish 90'	Stadium: Perry Park

==== FIFA U-20 World Cup ====
31 July 2011 Group stage	Australia	1–1	Ecuador	Manizales, Colombia
18:00 (UTC−5)	Oar 89'	Report	Govea 24'	Stadium: Estadio Palogrande; Attendance: 17,075; Referee: Djamel Haimoudi (Algeria)

3 August 2011 Group stage	Australia	2–3	Costa Rica	Manizales, Colombia
20:00 (UTC−5)	Oar 26'; Calvo 64' (o.g.)	Report	Campbell 22', 27'; Ruiz 72'	Stadium: Estadio Palogrande; Attendance: 10,130; Referee: Robert Schörgenhofer (Austria)

6 August 2011 Group stage	Australia	1–5	Spain	Manizales, Colombia
17:00 (UTC−5)	Bulut 27'	Report	Roberto 1'; Vázquez 6', 13', 18'; Canales 31' (pen.)	Stadium: Estadio Palogrande; Attendance: 14,722; Referee: Wilson Seneme (Brazil)

==== AFC U-19 Championship qualifying ====
2 November 2011	Singapore	0–1	Australia	Petaling Jaya, Malaysia
11:00 (UTC+8)		Report	Caira 51'	Stadium: MBPJ Stadium; Attendance: 60; Referee: Apisit Aonrak (Thailand)

4 November 2011	Australia	12–0	Macau	Petaling Jaya, Malaysia
11:00 (UTC+8)	Donachie 5'; Proia 9' (pen.), 31', 53', 69'; Makarounas 14' (pen.), 36'; Retre 34'; Brown 45+1'; Taggart 60', 90'; Geria 66'	Report		Stadium: MBPJ Stadium; Attendance: 25; Referee: Yu Ming-hsun (Chinese Taipei)

6 November 2011	Indonesia	1–4	Australia	Petaling Jaya, Malaysia
14:00 (UTC+8)	Lastaluhu 76' (pen.)	Report	Maclaren 4', 9' (pen.), 65'; Antonis 40'	Stadium: MBPJ Stadium; Attendance: 40; Referee: Timur Faizullin (Kyrgyzstan)

8 November 2011	Australia	3–0	China	Petaling Jaya, Malaysia
14:00 (UTC+8)	Maclaren 39'; Taggart 50'; Wooding 63'	Report		Stadium: MBPJ Stadium; Attendance: 20; Referee: Jin Ko-Hyung (South Korea)

=== Men's under 17 ===
==== AFC U-16 Championship qualifying ====
12 September 2011	Thailand	3–2	Australia	Bangkok, Thailand
18:00 (UTC+7)	Tonglim 44'; Pamornprasert 50' (pen.); Puangbut 53'	Report	Tombides 11'; O'Neill 59'	Stadium: Thephasadin Stadium; Attendance: 1,200; Referee: Jumpei Iida (Japan)

14 September 2011	Australia	4–0	Myanmar	Bangkok, Thailand
18:00 (UTC+7)	Warland 20'; De Silva 76', 87'; Tombides 79'	Report		Stadium: Rajamangala National Stadium; Attendance: 400; Referee: Lee Dong-Jun (South Korea)

17 September 2011	Australia	1–0	Hong Kong	Bangkok, Thailand
15:00 (UTC+7)	Warland 31'	Report		Stadium: Rajamangala National Stadium; Attendance: 150; Referee: Yasser Al Rawahi (Oman)

19 September 2011	Guam	0–10	Australia	Bangkok, Thailand
18:00 (UTC+7)		Report	Stergiou 10'; Tombides 51', 53', 65', 86', 90+2'; Ly 61'; MacDonald 67', 75', 81'	Stadium: Thephasadin Stadium; Attendance: 100; Referee: Lee Dong-Jun (South Korea)

22 September 2011	Australia	5–2	Indonesia	Bangkok, Thailand
18:00 (UTC+7)	Tombides 3', 78'; Calver 10'; Papadimitrios 39' (pen.); Tanner 63'	Report	Hargianto 9'; Kurniawan 66'	Stadium: Rajamangala National Stadium; Attendance: 100; Referee: Jumpei Iida (Japan)

==== AFF U-16 Youth Championship ====
2 June 2012 Group stage	Australia	1–1	Japan	Vientiane, Laos
16:00 (UTC+7)	Iredale 49'	Report	Miyoshi 44'	Stadium: New Laos National Stadium; Referee: Mohamed Yazeen Buhari (Singapore)

4 June 2012 Group stage	Laos	2–3	Australia	Vientiane, Laos
19:00 (UTC+7)	Kettavong 50'; Dalavong 81'	Report	Lap 62'; McDonald 72'; Calver 88'	Stadium: New Laos National Stadium

6 June 2012 Group stage	Australia	4–2	Thailand	Vientiane, Laos
16:00 (UTC+7)	Warland 10'; Hanna 15'; Lap 21'; De Silva 87'	Report	Miprathang 27'; Sitthichok 65'	Stadium: New Laos National Stadium

8 June 2012 Final	Australia	1–3	Japan	Vientiane, Laos
19:00 (UTC+7)	De Silva 8'	Report	Miyamoto 17'; Kawata 80'; Miyoshi 90+2'	Stadium: New Laos National Stadium; Referee: Yazeen Buhari (Singapore)

=== Women's senior ===
==== Friendlies ====
24 June 2012	Australia	1–1	New Zealand	Wollongong, Australia
	Slatyer 90'	Report	Morwood 50'	Stadium: WIN Stadium; Attendance: 3,677; Referee: Casey Reibelt (Australia)

27 June 2012	Australia	2–0	New Zealand	Wollongong, Australia
	Walsh 30', 57'	Report		Stadium: WIN Stadium

==== Olympic qualifying ====
1 September 2011 Final round	North Korea	1–0	Australia	Jinan, China
15:30 (UTC+8)	Kim Su-Gyong 10'	Report		Stadium: Jinan Olympic Sports Center; Attendance: 800; Referee: Alexandros Dimitropoulos (Greece)

3 September 2011 Final round	Australia	5–1	Thailand	Jinan, China
15:30 (UTC+8)	Simon 13'; Heyman 15', 34'; Butt 45' van Egmond 58'	Report	Taneekarn 59'	Stadium: Jinan Olympic Sports Center; Attendance: 200; Referee: Silvia Tea Spinelli (Italy)

5 September 2011 Final round	Japan	1–0	Australia	Jinan, China
15:30 (UTC+8)	Kawasumi 62'	Report		Stadium: Shandong Provincial Stadium; Attendance: 1,000; Referee: Mitsi Efthalia (Greece)

8 September 2011 Final round	Australia	1–0	China	Jinan, China
19:00 (UTC+8)	van Egmond 61'	Report		Stadium: Jinan Olympic Sports Center; Attendance: 10,167; Referee: Heikkinen Katja Maria Kirsi (Finland)

8 September 2011 Final round	South Korea	1–2	Australia	Jinan, China
15:30 (UTC+8)	Kwon Hah-Nul 27'	Report	de Vanna 62'; Butt 76'	Stadium: Shandong Provincial Stadium; Attendance: 765; Referee: Mitsi Efthalia (Greece)

=== Women's under-20 ===
==== AFC U-19 Women's Championship ====
6 October 2011	Vietnam	3–4	Australia	Ho Chi Minh City, Vietnam
16:00 (UTC+7)	Nguyễn Thị Nguyệt 6', 49'; Phạm Hoàng Quỳnh 37'	Report	O'Neill 4'; Gielnik 60', 62', 73'	Stadium: Thong Nhat Stadium; Attendance: 500; Referee: Kim Sook-Hee (Korea Republic)

8 October 2011	North Korea	1–0	Australia	Ho Chi Minh City, Vietnam
16:00 (UTC+7)	Kwon Song-Hwa 23'	Report		Stadium: Thanh Long Sports Centre; Attendance: 200; Referee: Qin Liang (China PR)

10 October 2011	Australia	0–1	Japan	Ho Chi Minh City, Vietnam
16:00 (UTC+7)		Report	Kyōkawa 42'	Stadium: Thong Nhat Stadium; Attendance: 200; Referee: Ri Hyang Ok (North Korea

13 October 2011	Australia	1–3	China	Ho Chi Minh City, Vietnam
16:00 (UTC+7)	van Egmond 80'	Report	Wang Tingting 33'; Yao Shuangyan 66'; Ni Mengjie 82'	Stadium: Thong Nhat Stadium; Attendance: 200; Referee: Rita Gani (Malaysia)

16 October 2011	Australia	2–4	South Korea	Ho Chi Minh City, Vietnam
16:00 (UTC+7)	Andrews 50'; Brown 82'	Report	Choi Yoojung 28'; Lee Geummin 67', 83'; Seo Hyunsook 68'	Stadium: Thanh Long Sports Centre; Attendance: 200; Referee: Ri Hyang Ok (North Korea)

=== Women's under-17 ===
==== Friendlies ====
3 October 2011	New Zealand	2–1	Australia	Auckland, New Zealand
	Puketapu 13'; Pereira 24'	Report	Harrison 88'	Stadium: North Harbour Stadium; Referee: Anna-Maree Keighley (New Zealand)

5 October 2011	New Zealand	0–0	Australia	Auckland, New Zealand
		Report		Stadium: North Harbour Stadium; Referee: Renee Silvester (New Zealand)

7 October 2011	New Zealand	3–1	Australia	Auckland, New Zealand
	Rolston 64'; Palmer 73'; Muir 80'	Report	McLaughlin 22'	Stadium: North Harbour Stadium; Referee: Steven Black (New Zealand)

==== AFC U-16 Women's Championship ====
November 2011	South Korea	4–0	Australia	Nanjing, China
14:30 (UTC+8)	Kim So-Yi 19', 47'; Lim Hee-Eun 35'; Namgung Yeji 90'	Report		Stadium: Nanjing Olympic Sports Center; Attendance: 75; Referee: Sato Nami (Japan)

5 November 2011	Australia	0–3	China	Nanjing, China
14:30 (UTC+8)		Report	Song Yuqing 18'; Song Duan 27', 55'	Stadium: Jiangning Sports Center; Referee: Cha Sung-Mi (South Korea)

7 November 2011	Australia	0–1	North Korea	Nanjing, China
17:30 (UTC+8)		Report	Ri Kyong-Hyang 90'	Stadium: Nanjing Olympic Sports Center; Referee: Nami Sato (Japan)

10 November 2011	Thailand	0–4	Australia	Nanjing, China
14:30 (UTC+8)		Report	Jones 21', 82'; Brown 62'; Sampson 64'	Stadium: Nanjing Olympic Sports Center; Referee: Ri Hong-Sil (North Korea)

13 November 2011	Australia	0–1	Japan	Nanjing, China
14:30 (UTC+8)		Report	Momiki 16'	Stadium: Jiangning Sports Center; Referee: Semaksuk Praew (Thailand)
