= 2015–16 in Australian soccer =

47th season of national competitive soccer in Australia

Soccer in Australia
- Season: 2015–16

Men's soccer
- A-League Premiership: Adelaide United
- A-League Championship: Adelaide United
- National Premier Leagues: Blacktown City
- FFA Cup: Melbourne Victory

Women's soccer
- W-League Premiership: Melbourne City
- W-League Championship: Melbourne City

The 2015–16 season was the 47th season of national competitive soccer in Australia and 133rd overall.

== Domestic competitions ==
=== A-League ===
Pos	Team	Pld	W	D	L	GF	GA	GD	Pts	Qualification
1	Adelaide United (C)	27	14	7	6	45	28	+17	49	Qualification for 2017 AFC Champions League group stage and Finals series
2	Western Sydney Wanderers	27	14	6	7	44	33	+11	48	Qualification for 2017 AFC Champions League group stage and Finals series
3	Brisbane Roar	27	14	6	7	49	40	+9	48	Qualification for 2017 AFC Champions League second preliminary round and Finals series
4	Melbourne City	27	13	5	9	63	44	+19	44	Qualification for Finals series
5	Perth Glory	27	13	4	10	49	42	+7	43	Qualification for Finals series
6	Melbourne Victory	27	11	8	8	40	33	+7	41	Qualification for Finals series
7	Sydney FC	27	8	10	9	36	36	0	34	
8	Newcastle Jets	27	8	6	13	28	41	−13	30	
9	Wellington Phoenix (Note: Wellington Phoenix cannot qualify for the AFC Champions League as they are not recognised as an AFC club.)	27	7	4	16	34	54	−20	25	
10	Central Coast Mariners	27	3	4	20	33	70	−37	13	

Source: A-Leagues
Rules for classification: 1) points; 2) goal difference; 3) number of goals scored.
(C) Champions

==== Finals series ====
Elimination-finals
Melbourne City	2
Perth Glory	0
Brisbane Roar	2
Melbourne Victory	1

Semi-finals
Adelaide United	4
Melbourne City	1
Western Sydney Wanderers (a.e.t.)	5
Brisbane Roar	4

Grand final
Adelaide United	3
Western Sydney Wanderers	1

=== W-League ===
Pos	Team	Pld	W	D	L	GF	GA	GD	Pts	Qualification
1	Melbourne City (C)	12	12	0	0	38	4	+34	36	Qualification to Finals series
2	Canberra United	12	8	2	2	26	8	+18	26	Qualification to Finals series
3	Sydney FC	12	6	1	5	15	21	−6	19	Qualification to Finals series
4	Brisbane Roar	12	5	1	6	16	17	−1	16	Qualification to Finals series
5	Adelaide United	12	3	4	5	18	19	−1	13	
6	Newcastle Jets	12	3	4	5	9	12	−3	13	
7	Western Sydney Wanderers	12	3	3	6	15	25	−10	12	
8	Perth Glory	12	3	2	7	10	23	−13	11	
9	Melbourne Victory	12	2	1	9	10	28	−18	7	

Source: A-Leagues
Rules for classification: 1) points; 2) goal difference; 3) number of goals scored.
(C) Champions

==== Finals series ====
Semi-finals
1	Melbourne City (p)	0(5)
4	Brisbane Roar	0(4)
2	Canberra United	0
3	Sydney FC	1

Grand Final
Melbourne City	4
Sydney FC	1

=== National Youth League ===
Conference A
Pos	Team	Pld	W	D	L	GF	GA	GD	Pts	Qualification
1	Adelaide United Youth	8	6	0	2	17	18	−1	18	Qualification to the Grand Final
2	Brisbane Roar Youth	8	5	0	3	28	10	+18	15	
3	Melbourne City Youth	8	3	1	4	18	23	−5	10	
4	Melbourne Victory Youth	8	3	0	5	17	22	−5	9	
5	Perth Glory Youth	8	2	1	5	8	15	−7	7	

Source: Foxtel National Youth League

Conference B
Pos	Team	Pld	W	D	L	GF	GA	GD	Pts	Qualification
1	Sydney FC Youth (C)	8	6	0	2	21	11	+10	18	Qualification to the Grand Final
2	Newcastle Jets Youth	8	5	1	2	17	12	+5	16	
3	Western Sydney Wanderers Youth	8	4	1	3	20	25	−5	13	
4	Central Coast Mariners Academy	8	3	0	5	24	22	+2	9	
5	FFA Centre of Excellence	8	1	0	7	13	25	−12	3	

Source: Foxtel National Youth League
(C) Champions

==== Grand final ====
23 January 2016	Adelaide United Youth	2 – 5	Sydney FC Youth	Gosford
16:00 AEDT	Tratt 32' (o.g.); Altundag 61'	Report	A. Mullen 12', 49'; Zuvela 23'; Burgess 40'; C. Gonzalez 56'	Stadium: Central Coast Stadium; Referee: Lachlan Keevers

=== National Premier Leagues ===
The 2015 National Premier Leagues Finals series began on 19 September 2015 and ended with the Grand Final on 3 October 2015. Blacktown City won the title for the first time.

Quarter-finals; 19–20 September
(South Australia) West Adelaide	1
(Western Australia) Bayswater City	2
(Victoria (state)) South Melbourne	1
(Tasmania) Olympia	2
(New South Wales) Blacktown City	4
(Australian Capital Territory) Canberra FC	1
(Queensland) Moreton Bay United	3
(New South Wales) Edgeworth Eagles	1

Semi-finals; 26–27 September
(Western Australia) Bayswater City	6
(Tasmania) Olympia	0
(New South Wales) Blacktown City	2
(Queensland) Moreton Bay United	1

Grand final 3 October
(Western Australia) Bayswater City	1
(New South Wales) Blacktown City	3

== Domestic cups ==
=== FFA Cup ===
The 2015 FFA Cup began on 29 July and ended on 7 November. It was the first season in which teams from all nine FFA member federations participated, with the Northern Territory participating for the first time.

Round of 32
Hume City (a.e.t.)	4
Brisbane Strikers	3
Gungahlin United	0
Sydney Olympic	1
Blacktown City	1
North Eastern MetroStars	2
Oakleigh Cannons (p)	1 (5)
Far North Queensland	1 (4)
Rockdale City Suns	3
Perth SC	1
Balmain Tigers	0
Melbourne Victory	6
Darwin Olympic	1
Adelaide United	6
Sorrento FC	0
Sydney FC	2
Croydon Kings	1
Queensland Lions	2
Newcastle Jets	2 (3)
Perth Glory (p)	2 (4)
Palm Beach (p)	1 (8)
South Melbourne	1 (7)
Western Sydney Wanderers	1
Brisbane Roar	0
Broadmeadow Magic	1
Heidelberg United	3
Sydney United 58 (p)	3 (3)
South Hobart	3 (1)
Edgeworth FC	1
Melbourne City	2
Central Coast Mariners	0
Wellington Phoenix	1

Round of 16
Hume City	3
Sydney Olympic	1
North Eastern MetroStars	0
Oakleigh Cannons	1
Rockdale City Suns	2
Melbourne Victory	3
Adelaide United (a.e.t.)	2
Sydney FC	1
Queensland Lions	0
Perth Glory (a.e.t.)	1
Palm Beach	0
Western Sydney Wanderers	2
Heidelberg United	2
Sydney United 58	0
Melbourne City	5
Wellington Phoenix	1

Quarter-finals
Hume City (a.e.t.)	3
Oakleigh Cannons	2
Melbourne Victory	3
Adelaide United	1
Perth Glory (p)	1 (4)
Western Sydney Wanderers	1 (2)
Heidelberg United	0
Melbourne City	5

Semi-finals
Hume City	0
Melbourne Victory	3
Perth Glory	3
Melbourne City	1

Final
Melbourne Victory	2
Perth Glory	0

== National teams ==
=== Men's senior ===
==== Friendlies ====
27 May 2016	England	2 – 1	Australia	Sunderland, England
20:00 BST	Rashford 3'; Rooney 55'	Report	Dier 75' (o.g.)	Stadium: Stadium of Light; Attendance: 46,595; Referee: Danny Makkelie (Netherlands)

4 June 2016 Dodoni Series	Australia	1 – 0	Greece	Sydney, Australia
20:00 AEST	Leckie 90+3'	Source		Stadium: ANZ Stadium; Attendance: 38,682; Referee: Jumpei Iida (Japan)

7 June 2016 Dodoni Series	Australia	1 – 2	Greece	Melbourne, Australia
20:00 AEST	Sainsbury 58'	Report	Mantalos 8'; Maniatis 20'	Stadium: Etihad Stadium; Attendance: 33,622; Referee: Bobby Madley (England)

==== FIFA World Cup qualification ====
2018 World Cup qualification matches also act as 2019 AFC Asian Cup qualification matches, following a change to the qualifying formats of both tournaments.

3 September 2015 Second round	Australia	5–0	Bangladesh	Perth, Australia
19:00 UTC+8	Leckie 6'; Rogić 8', 20'; Burns 29'; Mooy 61'	Report; Summary		Stadium: Perth Oval; Attendance: 19,495; Referee: Võ Minh Trí (Vietnam)

8 September 2015 Second round	Tajikistan	0–3	Australia	Dushanbe, Tajikistan
18:00 UTC+5		Report	Milligan 57'; Cahill 73', 90+1'	Stadium: Pamir Stadium; Attendance: 19,000; Referee: Jameel Abdulhusin (Bahrain)

8 October 2015 Second round	Jordan	2–0	Australia	Amman, Jordan
19:00 UTC+3	Abdel-Fattah 47' (pen.); Al-Dardour 84'	Report		Stadium: Amman International Stadium; Attendance: 11,462; Referee: Masaaki Toma (Japan)

12 November 2015 Second round	Australia	3–0	Kyrgyzstan	Canberra, Australia
20:00 UTC+11	Jedinak 40' (pen.); Cahill 50'; Amirov 69' (o.g.)	Report		Stadium: Canberra Stadium; Attendance: 19,412; Referee: Kim Sang-woo (South Korea)

17 November 2015 Second round	Bangladesh	0–4	Australia	Dhaka, Bangladesh
17:30 UTC+6		Report	Cahill 6', 32', 37'; Jedinak 43'	Stadium: Bangabandhu National Stadium; Attendance: 19,730; Referee: Wang Di (China)

24 March 2016 Second round	Australia	7–0	Tajikistan	Adelaide, Australia
19:30 UTC+10:30	Luongo 2'; Jedinak 13' (pen.); Milligan 57' (pen.); Burns 67', 87'; Rogic 70', 72'	Report		Stadium: Adelaide Oval; Attendance: 35,439; Referee: Fahad Al-Marri (Qatar)

29 March 2016 Second round	Australia	5–1	Jordan	Sydney, Australia
20:00 UTC+11	Cahill 24', 44'; Mooy 39'; Rogic 53'; Luongo 69'	Report	Deeb 90'	Stadium: Allianz Stadium; Attendance: 24,975; Referee: Kim Jong-hyeok (South Korea)

=== Men's under 23 ===
==== Friendlies ====
4 September 2015 Friendship Cup	Turkey	0–1	Australia	Istanbul, Turkey
20:30 (UTC+3)		Report	Maclaren 13'	Stadium: Kasımpaşa Stadium

7 September 2015	North Macedonia	3–1	Australia	Skopje, Republic of Macedonia
	Imeri 3'; Angelov 47'; Petkovski 60'	Report	Taggart 14'	Stadium: Football Federation of Macedonia Training Centre

9 October 2015	South Korea	2–0	Australia	Hwaseong, South Korea
17:40 (UTC+9)	Ji 7'; Yeon 27'	Report		Stadium: Hwaseong Stadium; Referee: Võ Minh Trí (Vietnam)

12 October 2015	South Korea	2–1	Australia	Incheon, South Korea
19:00 (UTC+9)	Ryu 49'; Lennox 82' (o.g.)	Report	Hoole 88'	Stadium: Incheon Munhak Stadium

12 November 2015	Qatar	3–1	Australia	Doha, Qatar
19:30 (UTC+3)	Afif 21'; Alaa 35'; Moein 52'		Amini 64'	Stadium: Grand Hamad Stadium

16 November 2015	Iran	1–1	Australia	Dubai, United Arab Emirates
16:00 (UTC+4)			Maclaren	Stadium: Iranian Club

==== AFC U-23 Championship ====
14 January 2016 Group Stage	Australia	0–1	United Arab Emirates	Doha, Qatar
19:30 (UTC+3)		Report (FFA); Report (AFC)	Gallifuoco 85' (o.g.)	Stadium: Grand Hamad Stadium; Attendance: 307; Referee: Abdulrahman Al-Jassim (Qatar)

17 January 2016 Group Stage	Vietnam	0–2	Australia	Doha, Qatar
16:30 (UTC+3)		Report (FFA); Report (AFC)	Donachie 2'; Maclaren 61'	Stadium: Grand Hamad Stadium; Attendance: 539; Referee: Ali Sabah (Iraq)

20 January 2016 Group Stage	Jordan	0–0	Australia	Doha, Qatar
19:30 (UTC+3)		Report (FFA); Report (AFC)		Stadium: Suheim Bin Hamad Stadium; Attendance: 2,338; Referee: Ryuji Sato (Japan)

=== Men's under-20 ===
==== AFF U-19 Youth Championship ====
Australia was scheduled to compete in the 2015 AFF U-19 Youth Championship tournament but withdrew before its commencement, citing a different strategy to preparations for 2016 AFC U-19 Championship qualification.

==== AFC U-19 Championship qualification ====
2 October 2015	Australia	6–0	Philippines	Vientiane, Laos
16:00 (UTC+7)	D'Agostino 8'; Kuzmanovski 14', 39'; Mells 28'; Fofanah 78'; Pandurevic 90+1'	Report		Stadium: Laos National Stadium; Attendance: 200; Referee: Kim Hee-gon (South Korea)

4 October 2015	Laos	0–2	Australia	Vientiane, Laos
19:00 (UTC+7)		Report	Kuzmanovski 43'; Shabow 46'	Stadium: Laos National Stadium; Attendance: 1,500; Referee: Kim Hee-gon (South Korea)

6 October 2015	Japan	3–0	Australia	Vientiane, Laos
16:00 (UTC+7)	Takagi 45+1'; Sakai 45+2' (pen.); Ogawa 71' (pen.)	Report		Stadium: Laos National Stadium; Attendance: 100; Referee: Fahad Al-Mirdasi (Saudi Arabia)

=== Men's under-17 ===
==== Friendlies ====
29 August 2015	Limoges youth	0–8	Australia	Limoges, France
		Report		Stadium: Stade Beaublanc

2 September 2015 Lafarge Foot Avenir	United States	1–1	Australia	Limoges, France
15:00 (UTC+2)	Gallardo 88'	Report	Derrick 64'	Stadium: Stade Beaublanc

4 September 2015 Lafarge Foot Avenir	Stade Rennais U19	1–2	Australia	Limoges, France
	Touffiqui 10'	Report	D'Agostino 8'; Mendez 54'	Stadium: Stade Beaublanc

6 September 2015 Lafarge Foot Avenir	France	6–0	Australia	Limoges, France
19:00 (UTC+2)	Fomba 7'; Maouassa 13'; Reine-Adelaïde 20'; Boutobba 37'; Edouard 71'; Cognat 75'	Report		Stadium: Stade Beaublanc

5 October 2015	Australia	1–2	Sydney FC Youth	Canberra, Australia
15:00 (UTC+11)	Bandiera	Source	Lokoli-Ngoy	Stadium: AIS Grass Fields

11 October 2015	Australia	1–1	Costa Rica	Rancagua, Chile
	Brimmer 67'	Report	Ramírez 16'	Stadium: Estadio El Teniente

==== AFF U-16 Youth Championship ====
30 July 2015 Group stage	Cambodia	0–4	Australia	Phnom Penh, Cambodia
18:30 (UTC+7)		Report	Brook 2', 45+1'; Italiano 31'; Sweedan 90+2'	Stadium: Olympic Stadium; Referee: Souei Vongkham (Laos)

1 August 2015 Group stage	Australia	8–2	Singapore	Phnom Penh, Cambodia
18:30 (UTC+7)	Najjarine 22'; Moric 23', 42', 70', 87'; Pierias 54', 90+2'; Akbari 77'	Report	Rezky 18'; Kweh 64'	Stadium: Olympic Stadium; Referee: Lim Bunthoeun (Cambodia)

3 August 2015 Group stage	Australia	4–0	Myanmar	Phnom Penh, Cambodia
18:30 (UTC+7)	Najjarine 7'; Pierias 16'; Valenti 19'; Moric 90+3'			Stadium: Olympic Stadium; Referee: Souei Vongkham (Laos)

5 August 2015 Group stage	Australia	8–2	Philippines	Phnom Penh, Cambodia
15:30 (UTC+7)	Roberts 5', 22', 28', 44'; Ryan 31'; Castaneda 70'; Moric 79'; Brook 87'	Report	Wilson 14'; Tacardon 24'	Stadium: Olympic Stadium; Referee: Mohammad Hasrin Haji Samat (Brunei)

7 August 2015 Semi-final	Australia	2−3	Thailand	Phnom Penh, Cambodia
18:30 (UTC+7)	Roberts 73' (pen.); Pierias 78'	Report	Jinnawat 48'; Hassawat 52'; Korawich 71'	Stadium: Olympic Stadium; Referee: Nguyễn Hiền Triệt (Vietnam)

9 August 2015 3rd Place	Laos	2−10	Australia	Phnom Penh, Cambodia
15:30 (UTC+7)	Sengsavang 41', 44'	Report	Roberts 16' (pen.), 55', 78'; Brook 22'; Sweedan 43'; Akbari 45+2', 79', 90+2'; Moric 70', 80'	Stadium: Olympic Stadium

==== AFC U-16 Championship qualification ====
16 September 2015	Australia	14–0	Guam	Hanoi, Vietnam
	Naputi 5' (o.g.); Akbari 15', 46'; Martis 39'; Muratovic 43', 53', 59'; Selden 45+1', 80'; Sweedan 65' (pen.), 79', 90'; Visciglio 70'; Yates 77'	Report		Stadium: Vietnam YFT Center; Attendance: 60; Referee: Turki Al-Khudhayr (Saudi Arabia)

18 September 2015	Myanmar	1–3	Australia	Hanoi, Vietnam
	Hein Htet Aung 25'	Report	Brook 2'; Moric 27'; Najjarine 37'	Stadium: Vietnam YFT Center; Attendance: 100; Referee: Jansen Foo (Singapore)

20 September 2015	Australia	1–0	Vietnam	Hanoi, Vietnam
15:30 (UTC+7)	Memeti 30'	Report		Stadium: Vietnam YFT Center; Attendance: 500; Referee: Turki Al-Khudhayr (Saudi Arabia)

==== FIFA U-17 World Cup ====
18 October 2015 Group stage	Australia	1–4	Germany	Chillán, Chile
16:00 (UTC-3)	Waring 54'	Report (FFA); Report (FIFA)	Passlack 14'; Eggestein 25', 39'; Janelt 65'	Stadium: Estadio Municipal Nelson Oyarzún Arenas; Attendance: 7,366; Referee: Mehdi Abid Charef (Algeria)

21 October 2015 Group stage	Australia	0–0	Mexico	Chillán, Chile
17:00 (UTC-3)		Report (FFA); Report (FIFA)		Stadium: Estadio Municipal Nelson Oyarzún Arenas; Attendance: 8,469; Referee: Janny Sikazwe (Zambia)

24 October 2015 Group stage	Argentina	1–2	Australia	Chillán, Chile
19:00 (UTC-3)	Conechny 67' (pen.)	Report (FFA); Report (FIFA)	Panetta 25', 52'	Stadium: Estadio Municipal Nelson Oyarzún Arenas; Attendance: 4,409; Referee: Ruddy Buquet (France)

28 October 2015 Round of 16	Nigeria	6–0	Australia	Viña del Mar, Chile
20:00 (UTC-3)	Osimhen 22', 73', 79'; Nwakali 25' (pen.); Essien 86'; Chukwueze 88'	Report (FFA); Report (FIFA)		Stadium: Estadio Sausalito; Attendance: 4,265; Referee: Roberto Tobar (Chile)

=== Women's senior ===
==== Friendlies ====
17 September 2015	United States	Cancelled	Australia	Detroit, United States
19:30 (UTC-4)		Report		Stadium: Ford Field

20 September 2015	United States	Cancelled	Australia	Birmingham, United States
14:00 (UTC-4)		Report		Stadium: Legion Field

25 October 2015 Dewellbon Cup	China	1–1	Australia	Chongqing, China
	Li D. 41' (pen.)	Report	Butt 12'

27 October 2015 Dewellbon Cup	England	1–0	Australia	Chongqing, China
	Christiansen 51'	Report (FFA); Report (FA)		Attendance: 1,800; Referee: Liang Qin (China)

29 November 2015	South Korea	0–1	Australia	Incheon, South Korea
14:15 (UTC+9)		Report	Simon 68'	Stadium: Incheon Sungui Stadium

4 June 2016	Australia	2–0	New Zealand	Ballarat, Australia
15:00 (UTC+10)	Foord 5', 51'	Report		Stadium: Morshead Park Stadium; Attendance: 4,371; Referee: Yoshimi Yamashita (Japan)

7 June 2016	Australia	1–1	New Zealand	Melbourne, Australia
17:00 (UTC+10)	De Vanna 73'	Report	Bowen 64'	Stadium: Etihad Stadium

==== AFC Women's Olympic qualifying tournament ====
29 February 2016	Australia	3–1	Japan	Osaka, Japan
19:35 (UTC+9)	De Vanna 25'; Heyman 41'; Gorry 78'	Report (FFA); Report (AFC)	Ōgimi 45+2'	Stadium: Kincho Stadium; Attendance: 4,988; Referee: Carina Vitulano (Italy)

2 March 2016	Australia	9–0	Vietnam	Osaka, Japan
16:35 (UTC+9)	Gielnik 10'; Simon 17', 38', 43'; Kennedy 19'; Sykes 64' van Egmond 68'; Heyman 77'; Polkinghorne 85'	Report (FFA); Report (AFC)		Stadium: Nagai Stadium; Attendance: 129; Referee: Esther Staubli (Switzerland)

4 March 2016	South Korea	0–2	Australia	Osaka, Japan
19:35 (UTC+9)		Report (FFA); Report (AFC)	Simon 1' van Egmond 15' (pen.)	Stadium: Nagai Stadium; Attendance: 1,149; Referee: Lucila Venegas (Mexico)

7 March 2016	North Korea	1–2	Australia	Osaka, Japan
19:35 (UTC+9)	Kim 78'	Report (FFA); Report (AFC)	Heyman 18'; Gorry 84'	Stadium: Nagai Stadium; Attendance: 900; Referee: Anna-Marie Keighley (New Zealand)

9 March 2016	Australia	1–1	China	Osaka, Japan
19:35 (UTC+9)	van Egmond 85'	Report (FFA); Report (AFC)	Ma 16'	Stadium: Nagai Stadium; Attendance: 4,766; Referee: Esther Staubli (Switzerland)

=== Women's under-20 ===
==== AFC U-19 Women's Championship ====
18 August 2015 Group stage	Japan	2–0	Australia	Nanjing, China
16:00 (UTC+8)	Kobayashi 10', 28'	Report		Stadium: Jiangsu Training Base Stadium; Attendance: 200; Referee: Ri Hyang Ok (North Korea)

20 August 2015 Group stage	China	2–1	Australia	Nanjing, China
19:00 (UTC+8)	Qin Manman 38'; Liu Yan 55'	Report	Harrison 67'	Stadium: Jiangning Sports Center; Attendance: 450; Referee: Rita Gani (Malaysia)

22 August 2015 Group stage	Australia	2–0	Uzbekistan	Nanjing, China
16:00 (UTC+8)	Kirby 36'; O'Brien 90+3'	Report		Stadium: Jiangsu Training Base Stadium; Attendance: 100; Referee: Maria Rebello (India)

== Retirements ==
- 7 July 2015: Matthew Nash, 34, former Sydney FC, Newcastle Jets and Central Coast Mariners goalkeeper.
- 24 July 2015: Zenon Caravella, 32, former Sydney Olympic, New Zealand Knights, Gold Coast United, Adelaide United and Newcastle Jets midfielder.
- 31 August 2015: Michael Turnbull, 34, former Marconi Staillions and New Zealand Knights goalkeeper.
- 1 September 2015: Nadine Angerer, 36, former Germany and Brisbane Roar goalkeeper.
- 13 October 2015: Alessandro Del Piero, 40, former Italy and Sydney FC forward.
- 21 December 2015: Damien Duff, 36, former Republic of Ireland and Melbourne City winger.
- 4 January 2016: Heather Garriock, 33, former Australia, Sydney FC and Western Sydney Wanderers midfielder.
- 10 April 2016: Ben Sigmund, 35, former New Zealand, Football Kingz and Wellington Phoenix defender.
- 30 April 2016: Shane Stefanutto, 36, former Australia, Brisbane Strikers, North Queensland Fury and Brisbane Roar defender.
- 1 May 2016: Patrick Kisnorbo, 35, former Australia, South Melbourne and Melbourne City defender.
- 8 May 2016: Ruben Zadkovich, 29, former Australia, Sydney FC, Newcastle Jets and Perth Glory midfielder.
- 21 May 2016: Albert Riera, 32, former Auckland City and Wellington Phoenix midfielder.
