= 2014–15 in Australian soccer =

46th season of national competitive soccer in Australia

Soccer in Australia
- Season: 2014–15

Men's soccer
- A-League Premiership: Melbourne Victory
- A-League Championship: Melbourne Victory
- National Premier Leagues: North Eastern MetroStars
- FFA Cup: Adelaide United

Women's soccer
- W-League Premiership: Perth Glory
- W-League Championship: Canberra United

The 2014–15 season was the 46th season of national competitive soccer in Australia and 132nd overall.

The season also included the inaugural FFA Cup (now Australia Cup), with the matches from the Round of 32 onwards taking place between July and December.

The domestic season scheduling was altered to avoid clashing with the 2015 AFC Asian Cup.

== Domestic leagues ==
=== A-League ===
The 2014–15 A-League regular season began on 10 October 2014 and ended on 26 April 2015.

Pos	Team	Pld	W	D	L	GF	GA	GD	Pts	Qualification
1	Melbourne Victory (C)	27	15	8	4	56	31	+25	53	Qualification for 2016 AFC Champions League group stage and Finals series
2	Sydney FC	27	14	8	5	52	35	+17	50	Qualification for 2016 AFC Champions League group stage and Finals series
3	Adelaide United	27	14	4	9	47	32	+15	46	Qualification for 2016 AFC Champions League qualifying play-off and Finals series
4	Wellington Phoenix (Note: Wellington Phoenix cannot qualify for the AFC Champions League as they are not recognised as an AFC club.)	27	14	4	9	45	35	+10	46	Qualification for Finals series
5	Melbourne City	27	9	8	10	36	41	−5	35	Qualification for Finals series
6	Brisbane Roar	27	10	4	13	42	43	−1	34	Qualification for Finals series
7	Perth Glory (Note: Perth Glory disqualified from the Finals series and given a compulsory 7th-place finish due to salary cap violations.)	27	14	8	5	45	35	+10	50	
8	Central Coast Mariners	27	5	8	14	26	50	−24	23	
9	Western Sydney Wanderers	27	4	6	17	29	44	−15	18	
10	Newcastle Jets	27	3	8	16	23	55	−32	17	

Source: A-League
Rules for classification: 1) points; 2) goal difference; 3) number of goals scored.
(C) Champions
Notes:

Elimination-finals; 1–3 May
Wellington Phoenix	0
Melbourne City	2
Adelaide United	2
Brisbane Roar	1

Semi-finals; 8–9 May
Melbourne Victory	3
Melbourne City	0
Sydney FC	4
Adelaide United	1

Grand final 17 May
Melbourne Victory	3
Sydney FC	0

=== W-League ===
The 2014–15 W-League regular season began on 13 September 2014 and ended on 7 December 2014.

Pos	Team	Pld	W	D	L	GF	GA	GD	Pts	Qualification
1	Perth Glory	12	10	0	2	39	10	+29	30	Qualification to Finals series
2	Melbourne Victory	12	6	2	4	26	15	+11	20	Qualification to Finals series
3	Canberra United (C)	12	6	2	4	22	18	+4	20	Qualification to Finals series
4	Sydney FC	12	5	3	4	17	16	+1	18	Qualification to Finals series
5	Newcastle Jets	12	5	2	5	25	21	+4	17	
6	Brisbane Roar	12	4	2	6	18	19	−1	14	
7	Adelaide United	12	3	1	8	9	29	−20	10	
8	Western Sydney Wanderers	12	2	2	8	14	42	−28	8	

Source: au.soccerway.com
Rules for classification: 1) points; 2) goal difference; 3) number of goals scored.
(C) Champions

Semi-finals; 13–14 December
1	Perth Glory	3
4	Sydney FC	0
3	Melbourne Victory	0(4)
2	Canberra United (p)	0(5)

Grand final 21 December
Perth Glory	1
Canberra United	3

=== National Premier Leagues ===
The 2014 National Premier Leagues regular season in the states' leagues ran from 21 February 2014 until 14 September 2014 and the states' finals series ran from 23 August 2014 until 14 September 2014.

The National Finals Series began on 20 September 2014 and ended with the Grand Final on 4 October 2014. The winner of the Grand Final was North Eastern MetroStars who qualified for the 2015 FFA Cup round of 32.

Elimination-finals; 20 September
(Australian Capital Territory) Cooma	1
(New South Wales) Bonnyrigg White Eagles	6
(New South Wales) Weston Workers	1
(Queensland) Palm Beach	2
(Tasmania) South Hobart	0
(Victoria (state)) South Melbourne	1
(Western Australia) Bayswater City	0 (3)
(South Australia) North Eastern MetroStars (p)	0 (4)

Semi-finals; 27–28 September
(New South Wales) Bonnyrigg White Eagles	1
(Queensland) Palm Beach	0
(Victoria (state)) South Melbourne	1
(South Australia) North Eastern MetroStars	2

Grand final 4 October
(New South Wales) Bonnyrigg White Eagles	0
(South Australia) North Eastern MetroStars	1

=== National Youth League ===
The National Youth League season 2014–15 ran from 14 October 2014 to 1 March 2015.

Pos	Team	Pld	W	D	L	GF	GA	GD	Pts
1	Melbourne City Youth (C)	18	10	5	3	40	27	+13	35
2	Brisbane Roar Youth	18	11	2	5	38	25	+13	35
3	Perth Glory Youth	18	10	4	4	33	24	+9	34
4	Sydney FC Youth	18	8	4	6	40	27	+13	28
5	Melbourne Victory Youth	18	8	3	7	34	33	+1	27
6	Central Coast Mariners Academy	18	8	2	8	38	34	+4	26
7	Adelaide United Youth	18	7	2	9	28	27	+1	23
8	Newcastle Jets Youth	18	7	2	9	31	37	−6	23
9	Western Sydney Wanderers Youth	18	6	2	10	21	29	−8	20
10	FFA Centre of Excellence	18	1	2	15	11	51	−40	5

Source: au.soccerway.com
Rules for classification: 1) points; 2) goal difference; 3) number of goals scored.
(C) Champions

== Domestic cups ==
=== FFA Cup ===
The 2014 FFA Cup began on 29 July and ended on 16 December. This was the inaugural staging of the competition.

Round of 32
Sydney United 58	4
Far North Queensland	1
Melbourne City	1
Sydney FC (a.e.t.)	3
Adelaide United	1
Wellington Phoenix	0
Stirling Lions	0
Brisbane Roar	4
Hakoah Sydney City East	1
Palm Beach	2
South Springvale (pen.)	2 (4)
South Cardiff	2 (3)
Olympic FC	3
Melbourne Knights	1
South Coast Wolves	0
Central Coast Mariners	1
Manly United	1
Sydney Olympic	3
Blacktown City	0
Bentleigh Greens	1
Adelaide City	1
Western Sydney Wanderers	0
Broadmeadow Magic	1
Brisbane Strikers (a.e.t.)	2
Parramatta FC	0
St Albans Saints	1
Newcastle Jets	0
Perth Glory	2
South Hobart	1 (4)
Tuggeranong United (pen.)	1 (5)
Bayswater City	0
Melbourne Victory	2

Round of 16
Sydney United 58	1
Sydney FC	3
Adelaide United	2
Brisbane Roar	0
Palm Beach	1
South Springvale	0
Olympic FC	1
Central Coast Mariners	3
Sydney Olympic	1
Bentleigh Greens	2
Adelaide City	1
Brisbane Strikers	0
St Albans Saints	1
Perth Glory	4
Tuggeranong United	0
Melbourne Victory	6

Quarter-finals
Sydney FC	1
Adelaide United (a.e.t.)	3
Palm Beach	0
Central Coast Mariners	5
Bentleigh Greens (a.e.t.)	2
Adelaide City	1
Perth Glory (a.e.t.)	4
Melbourne Victory	2

Semi-finals
Adelaide United	3
Central Coast Mariners	2
Bentleigh Greens	0
Perth Glory	3

Final
Adelaide United	1
Perth Glory	0

== International club competitions ==
=== FIFA Club World Cup ===
Western Sydney Wanderers qualified for the 2014 FIFA Club World Cup as winners of the 2014 AFC Champions League.

13 December 2014 Quarter-final	Cruz Azul (Mexico)	3–1	(Australia) Western Sydney Wanderers	Rabat, Morocco
19:30 (UTC+1)	Torrado 89' (pen.), 118' (pen.); Pavone 108'	Report	La Rocca 65'; Spiranovic (red card) 31'; Nikolai Topor-Stanley (red card) 53'	Stadium: Prince Moulay Abdellah Stadium; Attendance: 22,153; Referee: Noumandiez Doué (Ivory Coast)

17 December 2014 Match for fifth place	ES Sétif (Algeria)	2–2 (5–4 p)	(Australia) Western Sydney Wanderers	Marrakesh, Morocco
16:30 (UTC+1)	Mullen 50' (o.g.); Ziaya 57'	Report	Castelen 5'; Saba 89'	Stadium: Stade de Marrakech; Attendance: 18,458; Referee: Norbert Hauata (Tahiti)
	Penalties
	Djahnit (penalty missed); Gasmi (penalty scored); Belameiri (penalty scored); Ziaya (penalty missed); Mellouli (penalty scored); Arroussi (penalty missed); Megateli (penalty scored); Zerara (penalty scored)		(penalty scored) Saba; (penalty missed) Haliti; (penalty scored) Trifiro; (penalty scored) Juric; (penalty missed) Bouzanis; (penalty missed) Mullen; (penalty scored) Fofanah; (penalty missed) Adeleke

=== International Women's Club Championship ===
The W-League was represented in the third edition of the International Women's Club Championship, known for sponsorship reasons as the Nestlé Cup.

Melbourne Victory (the winners of the 2013–14 season) participated in the tournament, which took place from 30 November until 8 December 2013, and finished in sixth place (out of 6 teams).

== National teams ==
=== Men's senior ===
Australia played five friendlies ahead of the AFC Asian Cup. They recorded their 5th consecutive loss against Belgium at Stade Maurice Dufrasne in Liège but snapped the losing streak with their second win in the Ange Postecoglou era against Saudi Arabia at Craven Cottage in London. The Socceroos didn't succeed in their friendlies in the Persian Gulf, as they were held to a goalless draw against the United Arab Emirates on a hot and humid evening at Mohammed Bin Zayed Stadium in Abu Dhabi and 4 days later lost to Qatar at Abdullah bin Khalifa Stadium in Doha in their 500th international match. In their last friendly before the AFC Asian Cup, Australia lost to Japan at Nagai Stadium in Osaka, despite dominating the hosts in the first half.

Two months after being crowned champions of Asia, Australia played a pair of friendlies in Europe. In the first match they were close to upsetting world champions Germany at Fritz-Walter-Stadion in Kaiserslautern, but finished the match as a draw. In the following week they drew against Macedonia at Philip II Arena in Skopje, despite easily being the better side.

==== Friendlies ====
4 September 2014	Belgium	2–0	Australia	Liège, Belgium
20:45 (UTC+2)	Mertens 18'; Witsel 77'	Report		Stadium: Stade Maurice Dufrasne; Attendance: 16,850; Referee: Michael Oliver (England)

8 September 2014	Saudi Arabia	2–3	Australia	London, England
20:00 (UTC+1)	Fallatah 71' (pen.); Al-Jassim 84'	Report	Cahill 3'; Jedinak 6'; Wright 77'	Stadium: Craven Cottage; Attendance: 3,677; Referee: Martin Atkinson (England)

10 October 2014	United Arab Emirates	0–0	Australia	Abu Dhabi, United Arab Emirates
18:30 (UTC+4)		Report		Stadium: Mohammed Bin Zayed Stadium; Referee: Vladislav Tseytlin (Uzbekistan)

14 October 2014	Qatar	1–0	Australia	Doha, Qatar
19:30 (UTC+3)	Ibrahim 61'	Report		Stadium: Abdullah bin Khalifa Stadium

18 November 2014 Kirin Challenge Cup	Japan	2–1	Australia	Osaka, Japan
19:20 (UTC+9)	Konno 61'; Okazaki 68'	Report	Cahill 90+2'	Stadium: Nagai Stadium; Referee: Paweł Gil (Poland)

25 March 2015	Germany	2–2	Australia	Kaiserslautern, Germany
20:30 UTC+1	Reus 17'; Podolski 81'	Report	Troisi 40'; Jedinak 50'	Stadium: Fritz-Walter-Stadion; Attendance: 47,106; Referee: Michael Oliver (England)

30 March 2015	Macedonia	0–0	Australia	Skopje, Macedonia
21:00 UTC+2		Report		Stadium: Philip II Arena; Attendance: 1,000; Referee: Edin Jakupović (Bosnia and Herzegovina)

==== AFC Asian Cup ====
The 2015 AFC Asian Cup was played in Australia in January 2015. Australia were crowned champions for the first time after beating South Korea in extra time in the final.

9 January 2015 Group stage	Australia	4–1	Kuwait	Melbourne, Australia
20:00 (UTC+11)	Cahill 33'; Luongo 45'; Jedinak 62' (pen.); Troisi 90+2'	Report	Fadhel 8'	Stadium: Melbourne Rectangular Stadium; Attendance: 25,231; Referee: Ravshan Irmatov (Uzbekistan)

13 January 2015 Group stage	Australia	4–0	Oman	Sydney, Australia
20:00 (UTC+11)	McKay 27'; Kruse 30'; Milligan 45+2' (pen.); Juric 70'	Report		Stadium: Stadium Australia; Attendance: 50,276; Referee: Ryuji Sato (Japan)

17 January 2015 Group stage	Australia	0–1	South Korea	Brisbane, Australia
19:00 (UTC+10)		Report	Lee Jung-hyup 33'	Stadium: Brisbane Stadium; Attendance: 48,513; Referee: Nawaf Shukralla (Bahrain)

22 January 2015 Quarter-final	Australia	2–0	China	Brisbane, Australia
20:30 (UTC+10)	Cahill 49', 65'	Report		Stadium: Brisbane Stadium; Attendance: 46,067; Referee: Kim Jong-hyeok (South Korea)

27 January 2015 Semi-final	Australia	2–0	United Arab Emirates	Newcastle, Australia
20:00 (UTC+11)	Sainsbury 3'; Davidson 14'	Report		Stadium: Newcastle Stadium; Attendance: 21,079; Referee: Ravshan Irmatov (Uzbekistan)

31 January 2015 Final	Australia	2–1 (a.e.t.)	South Korea	Sydney, Australia
20:00 (UTC+11)	Luongo 45'; Troisi 105'	Report	Son Heung-min 90+1'	Stadium: Stadium Australia; Attendance: 76,385; Referee: Alireza Faghani (Iran)

=== FIFA World Cup qualification ===
16 June 2015 Second round	Kyrgyzstan	1–2	Australia	Bishkek, Kyrgyzstan
18:00 (UTC+6)	Baymatov 90+2'	Report	Jedinak 2'; Oar 67'	Stadium: Spartak Stadium; Attendance: 18,000; Referee: Khamis Al-Marri (Qatar)

=== Men's under 23 ===
==== Friendlies ====
14 November 2014	Brazil	2–2	Australia	Wuhan, China
16:00 (UTC+8)	45'; 66'; (red card) 90'	Report	Gameiro 21'; Amini 90' (pen.)	Stadium: Wuhan Sports Center Stadium

16 November 2014	China	3–1	Australia	Wuhan, China
19:30 (UTC+8)	Xie 11'; Wu 57'; 75'	Report	Cooper 22'	Stadium: Wuhan Sports Center Stadium

18 November 2014	South Korea	0–1	Australia	Wuhan, China
16:00 (UTC+8)		Report	Maclaren 38'	Stadium: Wuhan Sports Center Stadium

==== AFC U-23 Championship qualification ====
27 March 2015	Australia	6–0	Hong Kong	Kaohsiung, Taiwan
16:00 (UTC+8)	Amini 10'; Pain 21', 79'; Maclaren 76', 90+1', 90+5'	Report		Stadium: National Stadium; Attendance: 300; Referee: Minoru Tōjō (Japan)

29 March 2015	Chinese Taipei	0–4	Australia	Kaohsiung, Taiwan
19:00 (UTC+8)		Report	Brillante 2'; Taggart 45'; Sotirio 59'; Smith 78'	Stadium: National Stadium; Attendance: 5,000

31 March 2015	Australia	5–1	Myanmar	Kaohsiung, Taiwan
16:00 (UTC+8)	Hoole 10', 57', 70'; Maclaren 13', 68'	Report	Kaung Sat Naing 78'	Stadium: National Stadium; Attendance: 200; Referee: Marai Al-Awaji (Saudi Arabia)

=== Men's under 20 ===
==== Friendlies ====
14 July 2014 US NTC Invitational	Australia	4–1	Bermuda	Los Angeles, United States
15:00 (UTC−8)	Mabil 23', 55'; Marino 90+2'; Mauk 90+3'	Report	Galloway 41' (o.g.)	Stadium: StubHub Center; Attendance: 75; Referee: Jon Freemon (United States)

16 July 2014 US NTC Invitational	Australia	5–4	Chile	Los Angeles, United States
13:00 (UTC−8)	Marino 16'; Clut 38'; Mabil 75', 79'; De Silva 90'	Report	Pardo 40'; Cuevas 45+5' (pen.); Carvalho 49'; Díaz 71'	Stadium: StubHub Center; Attendance: 75; Referee: Bernard Hosu (United States)

18 July 2014 US NTC Invitational	United States	0–0	Australia	Los Angeles, United States
19:00 (UTC−8)		Report		Stadium: StubHub Center; Attendance: 700; Referee: Victor Rivas (United States)

5 August 2014	A-League All Stars (Australia)	0–0	Australia	Wollongong, Australia
19:30 (UTC+10)		Report		Stadium: WIN Stadium; Attendance: 7,000; Referee: Strebre Delovski (Australia)

24 September 2014	Central Coast Mariners (Australia)	1–5	Australia	Gosford, Australia
		Report		Stadium: Central Coast Stadium; Attendance: 0 (Behind closed doors)

27 September 2014	Newcastle Jets (Australia)	2–1	Australia	Gosford, Australia
	Pepper 18'; Jerónimo 25'	Report	Mauk 89' (pen.)	Stadium: Central Coast Stadium; Attendance: 0 (Behind closed doors)

3 May 2015 Five Nations Series	New Zealand	2–3	Australia	Auckland, New Zealand
19:00 (UTC+12)	Lewis 28'; Rufer 40'	Report	Woodcock 31'; Fofanah 58'; Blackwood 63'	Stadium: QBE Stadium

7 May 2015 Five Nations Series	Qatar	4–1	Australia	Auckland, New Zealand
16:00 (UTC+12)	Afif 15'; Al Gabali 35'; Al Abdien 49', 58'	Report	Fofanah 53'	Stadium: Mount Smart Stadium

10 May 2015 Five Nations Series	Panama	6–1	Australia	Hamilton, New Zealand
13:00 (UTC+12)	Small 5', 7', 40', 55'; Araya 45', 61'	Report	Kuzmanovski 30'	Stadium: Waikato Stadium

13 May 2015 Five Nations Series	Ghana	2–0	Australia	Hamilton, New Zealand
16:00 (UTC+12)	Boateng 23'; Yeboah 28' (pen.)	Report		Stadium: Waikato Stadium

18 May 2015	Australia	1–2	United States	Gosford, Australia
18:00 (UTC+10)	Mauk 15'	Report	Soñora 61'; Tall 63'	Stadium: Central Coast Stadium; Attendance: 600; Referee: Chris Young (Australia)

24 May 2015	Australia	2–2	Mexico	Sydney, Australia
16:30 AEST	Borrello 30' (pen.); Brady 42'	Report	Pineda 83'; Márquez 88' (pen.)	Stadium: Jubilee Oval; Referee: Kris Griffiths-Jones (Australia)

27 May 2015	Australia	0–1	Brazil	Wollongong, Australia
18:00 (UTC+10)	Borrello (yellow card) 60' (yellow-red card)	Report	João Pedro 15'	Stadium: WIN Stadium

==== AFF U-19 Youth Championship ====
5 September 2014 Group stage	Vietnam	1–0	Australia	Hanoi, Vietnam
19:00 (UTC+7)	Phượng 88'	Report; Summary		Stadium: Hàng Đẫy Stadium; Referee: Suhaizi Shukri (Malaysia)

7 September 2014 Group stage	Australia	3–4	Japan	Hanoi, Vietnam
16:30 (UTC+7)	Galloway 17'; Ascroft 60'; Skapetis 90' (pen.)	Report; Summary	Yamato 44'; Masaya 45+1', 58'; Daisuke 90+3'	Stadium: Hàng Đẫy Stadium; Referee: Hadimin Shahbuddin (Brunei)

==== AFC U-19 Championship ====
10 October 2014 Group stage	Australia	1–1	United Arab Emirates	Yangon, Myanmar
18:30 (UTC+6:30)	Borrello 79'	Report; Summary	Mubarak 84' (pen.)	Stadium: Thuwunna Stadium; Attendance: 625; Referee: Yudai Yamamoto (Japan)

12 October 2014 Group stage	Indonesia	0–1	Australia	Yangon, Myanmar
14:00 (UTC+6:30)		Report; Summary	Sotirio 67'	Stadium: Thuwunna Stadium; Attendance: 450; Referee: Abdulrahman Abdou (Qatar)

14 October 2014 Group stage	Uzbekistan	1–1	Australia	Yangon, Myanmar
18:30 (UTC+6:30)	Urinboev 82'	Report; Summary	Mauk 66'	Stadium: Thuwunna Stadium; Attendance: 536; Referee: Nawaf Shukralla (Bahrain)

=== Men's under 17 ===
==== Friendlies ====
28 November 2014 Nike International Friendlies	Australia	0–4	Brazil	Lakewood Ranch, United States
15:00 (UTC-5)	Davies (yellow card) 44' (yellow-red card) 75'	Report	Andrey 5'; Evander 32'; Leandro 48'; Lincoln 63'	Stadium: Premier Sports Campus; Referee: Caleb Mendez (United States)

30 November 2014 Nike International Friendlies	United States	2–1	Australia	Lakewood Ranch, United States
18:00 (UTC-5)	Gaines 15' de la Torre 69'	Report	Caletti 3'	Stadium: Premier Sports Campus; Attendance: 1,400; Referee: Chipalo Street (United States)

2 December 2014 Nike International Friendlies	England	2–1	Australia	Lakewood Ranch, United States
15:00 (UTC-5)	Ugbo 29'; Hector-Ingram 76'	Report	Joice 57'	Stadium: Premier Sports Campus; Attendance: 300; Referee: Randall Kelley (United States)

==== AFC U-16 Championship ====
6 September 2014 Group stage	Australia	3–0	China	Bangkok, Thailand
19:00 (UTC+7)	Bandiera 16'; Joice 60'; Petratos 72'	Report; Summary		Stadium: Rajamangala Stadium; Attendance: 130; Referee: Mohanad Qasim Eesee Sarray (Iraq)

8 September 2014 Group stage	Hong Kong	0–2	Australia	Bangkok, Thailand
16:00 (UTC+7)		Report; Summary	Devereux 27'; Reiners 86'	Stadium: Rajamangala Stadium; Attendance: 102; Referee: Ammar Al Junaibi (United Arab Emirates)

10 September 2014 Group stage	Japan	2–4	Australia	Nonthaburi, Thailand
16:00 (UTC+7)	Takumi 27'; Takuya 69'	Report; Summary	Brimmer 15', 59'; Joice 25', 81'	Stadium: SCG Stadium; Attendance: 350; Referee: Alireza Faghani (Iran)

14 September 2014 Quarter-final	Australia	2–1	Malaysia	Nonthaburi, Thailand
15:30 (UTC+7)	Joice 35'; Maskin 76'	Report; Summary	Raj 31'	Stadium: SCG Stadium; Attendance: 200; Referee: Kim Dong-jin (South Korea)

17 September 2014 Semi-final	Australia	1–1 (1–4 p)	North Korea	Bangkok, Thailand
20:00 (UTC+7)	Arzani 85'	Report; Summary	Pak Yong-gwan 47'	Stadium: Rajamangala Stadium; Attendance: 150; Referee: Fahad Jaber Al Marri (Qatar)
	Penalties
	Brimmer (penalty missed); Rowles (penalty scored); Bandiera (penalty missed)		(penalty scored) Kim Wi-song; (penalty scored) Kim Ye-Bom; (penalty scored) Ri Kuk-hyon; (penalty scored) Jang Song-Il

=== Women's senior ===
==== Friendlies ====
10 February 2015	North Korea	1–2	Australia	Auckland, New Zealand
15:30 (UTC+13)	Kim Yun-Mi 14'	Report	Polkinghorne 11'; Heyman 37'	Stadium: Bill McKinlay Park

12 February 2015	New Zealand	2–3	Australia	Auckland, New Zealand
19:00 (UTC+13)	Gregorius 57', 83'	Report	van Egmond 9'; Heyman 12'; Foord 29'	Stadium: Bill McKinlay Park

7 April 2015	Austria	2–1	Australia	Villach, Austria
18:00 (UTC+1)	Schiechtl 25'; Makas 28'	Report	Gorry 85'	Stadium: Stadion Villach Lind

9 April 2015	Scotland	1–1	Australia	Falkirk, Scotland
14:30 (UTC+1)	Ross 59'	Report	Alleway 26'	Stadium: Falkirk Stadium

19 May 2015	Australia	4–0	Vietnam	Sydney, Australia
	Catley 17'; Foord 29'; Simon 47'; Heyman 48'	Report		Stadium: Valentine Sports Park; Attendance: 0 (behind closed doors)

21 May 2015	Australia	11–0	Vietnam	Sydney, Australia
	Gorry 7'; Heyman 12', 19', 30'; Alleway 14'; De Vanna 15', 61'; Kerr 18', 48' van Egmond 21'; Foord 84'	Report		Stadium: Jubilee Oval

==== Cyprus Cup ====
4 March 2015 Group stage	Netherlands	0–1	Australia	Larnaca, Cyprus
17:30 (UTC+2)		Report	Crummer 73'	Stadium: GSZ Stadium

6 March 2015 Group stage	Australia	0–3	England	Nicosia, Cyprus
17:30 (UTC+2)			Taylor 8', 17', 83'	Stadium: GSP Stadium

9 March 2015 Group stage	Australia	3–0	Finland	Larnaca, Cyprus
17:30 (UTC+2)	Gill 29'; Sykes 77' van Egmond 89'	report		Stadium: GSZ Stadium

11 March 2015 Fifth place match	Australia	6–2	Czech Republic	Paralimni, Cyprus
14:00 (UTC+2)	Gorry 8' van Egmond 15'; De Vanna 34'; Heyman 54'; Polkinghorne 85'; Sykes 86'	Report	Benýrová 8', 63'	Stadium: Paralimni Stadium

==== FIFA Women's World Cup ====
Australia qualified for the 2015 FIFA Women's World Cup by finishing in the top four of the 2014 AFC Women's Asian Cup.

8 June 2015 Group stage	United States	3–1	Australia	Winnipeg, Canada
	Rapinoe 12', 78'; Press 61'	Report	De Vanna 27'	Stadium: Winnipeg Stadium; Attendance: 31,148; Referee: Claudia Umpierrez (Uruguay)

12 June 2015 Group stage	Australia	2–0	Nigeria	Winnipeg, Canada
	Simon 29', 68'	Report		Stadium: Winnipeg Stadium; Attendance: 32,716; Referee: Stéphanie Frappart (France)

16 June 2015 World Cup group stage	Australia	1–1	Sweden	Edmonton, Canada
	De Vanna 5'	Report	Jakobsson 15'	Stadium: Commonwealth Stadium; Attendance: 10,177; Referee: Lucila Venegas (Mexico)

21 June 2015 World Cup round of 16	Brazil	0–1	Australia	Moncton, Canada
				Stadium: Moncton Stadium; Attendance: 12,054; Referee: Teodora Albon (Romania)

27 June 2015 World Cup quarter-final	Australia	0–1	Japan	Edmonton, Canada
		Report	Iwabuchi 87'	Stadium: Commonwealth Stadium; Attendance: 19,814; Referee: Kateryna Monzul (Ukraine)

=== Women's under 20 ===
==== AFC U-19 Women's Championship qualification ====
5 November 2014	Australia	6–0	Hong Kong	Hanoi, Vietnam
13:00 (UTC+7)	Crummer 25'; Harrison 49'; Ibini 65'; Condon 74'; Goad 76', 84'	Summary; Report		Stadium: Vietnam Youth Football Training Centre; Attendance: 30; Referee: Kim Sookhee (South Korea)

7 November 2014	Singapore	0–19	Australia	Hanoi, Vietnam
13:00 (UTC+7)		Summary; Report	Franco 5', 11', 29', 35', 44', 59'; Chidiac 23', 70'; Baker 25', 45', 72', 80'; Goodrich 34'; Goad 50'; Binte Ros 68' (o.g.); Condon 74'; Price 83' (pen.), 86'; Harrison 90+2'	Stadium: Vietnam Youth Football Training Centre; Attendance: 60; Referee: Maria Piedade Rebello (India)

9 November 2014	Australia	3–0	Vietnam	Hanoi, Vietnam
15:15 (UTC+7)	Harrison 8' (pen.); Goad 56'; Franco 81'	Summary; Report		Stadium: Vietnam Youth Football Training Centre; Attendance: 150; Referee: Qin Liang (China)

==== AFF Women's Championship ====
1 May 2015 Group stage	Thailand	0–3	Australia	Ho Chi Minh City, Vietnam
16:00 UTC+7		Report	Harrison 53' (pen.); Goad 77'; Checker 83'	Stadium: Thống Nhất Stadium; Referee: Thein Thein Aye (Myanmar)

3 May 2015 Group stage	Australia	1–0	Laos	Ho Chi Minh City, Vietnam
16:00 UTC+7	Ferguson 60'	Report		Stadium: Thống Nhất Stadium; Referee: Seinn Cho Aung (Myanmar)

5 May 2015 Group stage	Australia	7–0	Indonesia	Ho Chi Minh City, Vietnam
18:30 UTC+7	Baker 9', 29'; Ibini 26'; Condon 32', 60'; Chidiac 42'; Price 56'	Report		Stadium: Thống Nhất Stadium; Referee: Mai Hoàng Trang (Vietnam)

8 May 2015 Semi-final	Australia	0–1	Myanmar	Ho Chi Minh City, Vietnam
16:00 UTC+7		Report	Ye Ye Oo 50'	Stadium: Thống Nhất Stadium; Referee: Mai Hoàng Trang (Vietnam)

10 May 2015 Third place match	Australia	4–3	Vietnam	Ho Chi Minh City, Vietnam
16:00 UTC+7	Ferguson 4'; Ibini 56', 90+4'; Goad 74'	Report	Minh Nguyệt 11' (pen.), 31'; Tuyết Dung 84'	Stadium: Thống Nhất Stadium

=== Women's under 17 ===
==== AFC U-16 Women's Championship qualification ====
4 October 2014	Australia	6–0	Vietnam	Malacca City, Malaysia
16:30 (UTC+8)	Taranto 6'; Petratos 13', 31'; Ayres 24', 26'; Maher 90'	Report		Stadium: Hang Tuah Stadium; Attendance: 60; Referee: Qin Liang (China)

6 October 2014	Hong Kong	0–10	Australia	Malacca City, Malaysia
16:30 (UTC+8)		Report	Cartwright 8', 86'; Bourke 16'; Brodigan 52', 55', 83', 84'; Ammendolia 46', 67', 90+3'	Stadium: Hang Jebat Stadium; Attendance: 50; Referee: Kajiyama Fusako (Japan)

8 October 2014	Australia	0–1	South Korea	Malacca City, Malaysia
16:30 (UTC+8)		Report	Im So-jeong 69'	Stadium: Hang Jebat Stadium; Attendance: 100; Referee: Qin Liang (China)
