= 2009–10 in Australian soccer =

Soccer in Australia
- Season: 2009–10

Men's soccer
- A-League Premiership: Sydney FC (1st title)
- A-League Championship: Sydney FC (2nd title)

Women's soccer
- W-League Premiership: Sydney FC
- W-League Championship: Sydney FC

The 2009–10 season was the 41st season of national competitive Soccer in Australia and 127th overall.

== National teams ==
=== Men's senior ===
==== Friendly matches ====
Win Tie Loss

12 August 2009	Republic of Ireland	0–3	Australia	Limerick, Ireland
19:30 UTC+1		(Report)	Cahill 39', 44'; Carney 90+3'	Stadium: Thomond Park; Attendance: 19,428; Referee: Pérez Burrul (Spain)

5 September 2009	South Korea	3–1	Australia	Seoul, South Korea
20:00 UTC+9	Park 5'; J. Lee 21'; Seol 87'	(Report)	Kisnorbo 34'	Stadium: Seoul World Cup Stadium; Referee: Subkhiddin Mohd Salleh (Malaysia)

10 October 2009	Australia	0–0	Netherlands	Sydney, Australia
19:30 UTC+10		(Report)		Stadium: Sydney Football Stadium; Attendance: 40,537

24 May 2010	Australia	2–1	New Zealand	Melbourne, Australia
19:30 UTC+10	Vidošić 57'; Holman 90'	(Report)	Killen 16'	Stadium: Melbourne Cricket Ground; Attendance: 55,659; Referee: Ricardo Salazar (United States)

1 June 2010	Australia	1–0	Denmark	Johannesburg, South Africa
14:00 UTC+02	Kennedy 71'	(Report)		Stadium: Ruimsig Stadium; Attendance: 5,000; Referee: Daniel Bennett (South Africa)

5 June 2010	United States	3–1	Australia	Johannesburg, South Africa
14:30 UTC+02	Buddle 4', 31'; Gomez 90'	(Report)	Cahill 19'	Stadium: Ruimsig Stadium; Attendance: 6,000; Referee: Abdul Ebrahim (South Africa)

==== 2011 AFC Asian Cup Qualification ====
14 October 2009	Australia	1–0	Oman	Melbourne, Australia
19:30 UTC+10	Cahill 73'	(Report)		Stadium: Docklands Stadium; Attendance: 20,595; Referee: Toma Maasaki (Japan)

14 November 2009	Oman	1–2	Australia	Muscat, Oman
18:00 UTC+4	Ayil 16' (pen.)	(Report)	Wilkshire 43'; Emerton 83'	Stadium: Sultan Qaboos Sports Complex; Attendance: 12,000; Referee: Sun Baojie (China)

6 January 2010	Kuwait	2–2	Australia	Kuwait City, Kuwait
17:30 UTC+3	Bandar 40'; Naser 44'	(Report)	Wilkshire 2'; Heffernan 4'	Stadium: Al Kuwait Sports Club Stadium; Attendance: 10,000; Referee: Ravshan Irmatov (Uzbekistan)

3 March 2010	Australia	1–0	Indonesia	Brisbane, Australia
19:00 UTC+10	Milligan 42'	(Report)		Stadium: Suncorp Stadium; Attendance: 20,422; Referee: Ogiya Kenji (Japan)

==== 2010 FIFA World Cup ====
===== Group D =====
13 June 2010	Germany	4–0	Australia	Durban, South Africa
20:30 UTC+02	Podolski 8'; Klose 26'; Müller 68'; Cacau 70'	Report		Stadium: Moses Mabhida Stadium; Attendance: 62,660; Referee: Marco Antonio Rodríguez (Mexico)

19 June 2010	Ghana	1–1	Australia	Rustenburg, South Africa
16:00 UTC+02	Gyan 25' (pen.)	Report	Holman 11'	Stadium: Royal Bafokeng Stadium; Attendance: 34,812; Referee: Roberto Rosetti (Italy)

23 June 2010	Australia	2–1	Serbia	Nelspruit, South Africa
20:30 UTC+02	Cahill 69'; Holman 73'	Report	Pantelić 84'	Stadium: Mbombela Stadium; Attendance: 37,836; Referee: Jorge Larrionda (Uruguay)

=== Men's under-20 ===
==== Friendlies ====
25 July 2009 Copa Ciudad de Rosario	Australia	0–0 (3–4 p)	Uruguay	Rosario, Argentina
		Report

29 July 2009 Copa Ciudad de Rosario	Australia	3–1	United States	Rosario, Argentina
	Naidovski 87'; Cernak 90'; Mooy 90+3'	Report	28'

6 April 2010	Paraguay	2–0	Australia	Asunción, Paraguay
	Benítez 3'; Torres 40'	Report		Stadium: Estadio Dr. Nicolás Léoz

8 April 2010	Paraguay	2–0	Australia	Asunción, Paraguay
16:30	Contrera 12'; Medina 50'	Report		Stadium: Estadio La Arboleda

==== AFF U-19 Youth Championship ====
4 August 2009 Group stage	Singapore	1–1	Australia	Ho Chi Minh City, Vietnam
17:45	Khairul Nizam 65'	Report	Babalj 20'	Stadium: Thanh Long Centre

6 August 2009 Group stage	Thailand	1–1	Australia	Ho Chi Minh City, Vietnam
15:30	Rawanprakone 90+1'	Report	Franjic 84'	Stadium: Thống Nhất Stadium

8 August 2009 Group stage	Cambodia	0–3	Australia	Ho Chi Minh City, Vietnam
15:30		Report	Virgili 41'; Taseski 42', 51'	Stadium: Thanh Long Centre

10 August 2009 Semifinal	Australia	4–1	Vietnam	Ho Chi Minh City, Vietnam
17:45	Leckie 28'; Bowles 70'; Virgili 82'; Groenewald 90+2'	Report	Hà Minh Tuấn 34'	Stadium: Thống Nhất Stadium

12 August 2009 Final	Thailand	2–2 (a.e.t.) (3–2 p)	Australia	Ho Chi Minh City, Vietnam
17:45	Natthawut Kamrin 69'; Adisak Kraisorn 101'	Report	McGowan 90'; Lum 120'	Stadium: Thống Nhất Stadium
	Penalties
	Apisit Kamwang (penalty scored); Piyarat Lajungreed (penalty scored); Surachet Ngamtip (penalty scored); Chakrit Rawanprakone (penalty missed); Pittayapat Mangkata (penalty missed)		Davidson (penalty missed); Babalj (penalty missed); McGowan (penalty missed); Groenewald (penalty scored); Virgili (penalty scored)

==== FIFA U-20 World Cup ====
27 September 2009 Group stage	Czech Republic	2–1	Australia	Port Said, Egypt
16:00 (UTC+2)	Rabušic 50'; Pekhart 89' (pen.)	Report	Holland 90+4' (pen.)	Stadium: Port Said Stadium; Referee: Marco Antonio Rodríguez (Mexico)

30 September 2009 Group stage	Australia	0–3	Costa Rica	Port Said, Egypt
16:00 (UTC+2)		Report	Madrigal 35'; DeVere 82' (o.g.); Guzmán 90+3'	Stadium: Port Said Stadium; Referee: Mohamed Benouza (Algeria)

3 October 2009 Group stage	Australia	1–3	Brazil	Port Said, Egypt
21:30 (UTC+2)	Mooy 14'	Report	Ciro 34'; Douglas Costa 62'; Ganso 81'	Stadium: Port Said Stadium; Referee: Frank De Bleeckere (Belgium)

==== AFC U-19 Championship qualification ====
7 November 2009	Australia	3–1	Hong Kong	Bandung, Indonesia
21:00 (UTC+7)	Bulut 30', 34'; Taseski 80'	Report	Wong 55' (pen.)	Stadium: Jalak Harupat Stadium

9 November 2009	Chinese Taipei	0–4	Australia	Bandung, Indonesia
21:00 (UTC+7)		Report	Babalj 68', 81'; McGowan 70'; Lustica 90' (pen.)	Stadium: Jalak Harupat Stadium

12 November 2009	Australia	8–0	Singapore	Bandung, Indonesia
18:00 (UTC+7)	Gallagher 7'; Lustica 29' (pen.); Grant 31'; Petratos 47'; Babalj 57' (pen.); Kantarovski 60', 78'; Danning 70'	Report		Stadium: Jalak Harupat Stadium

14 November 2009	Indonesia	0–0	Australia	Bandung, Indonesia
21:00 (UTC+7)		Report		Stadium: Jalak Harupat Stadium

17 November 2009	Australia	2–3	Japan	Bandung, Indonesia
15:00 (UTC+7)	McGowan 40'; Oar 67'	Report	Nagai 48', 90+5'; Kikuchi 50' (pen.)	Stadium: Jalak Harupat Stadium

=== Men's under-17 ===
==== AFC U-16 Championship qualification ====
6 October 2009	Australia	7–0	Laos	Canberra, Australia
19:00	Monaco 26', 44'; Paterson 42'; Morton 49'; Makarounas 73'; Da Silva 77'; Perkatis 80'	Report		Stadium: McKellar Park; Attendance: 300; Referee: Pandian Palaniyandi (Singapore)

10 October 2009	Australia	2–2	Malaysia	Canberra, Australia
19:00	Ilic 12'; Gallifuoco 71'	Report	Syazwan 75'; Faiz 85'	Stadium: McKellar Park; Attendance: 300; Referee: Ng Chiu Kok (Hong Kong)

12 October 2009	Laos	0–6	Australia	Canberra, Australia
19:00		Report	Gallifuoco 29'; Makarounas 45'; Morton 70'; Chapman 76'; Ilic 80', 90'	Stadium: McKellar Park; Attendance: 300; Referee: Hajime Matsuo (Japan)

16 October 2009	Malaysia	1–2	Australia	Canberra, Australia
19:00	Ishak 44'	Report	Makarounas 9'; Degenek 33'	Stadium: McKellar Park; Attendance: 300; Referee: Pandian Palaniyandi (Singapore)

=== Women's senior ===
==== Friendlies ====
17 February 2010 Friendly	New Zealand	0–3	Australia	Auckland, New Zealand
		Report	Walsh 23', 52'; De Vanna 84'	Stadium: North Harbour Stadium; Attendance: 1,853; Referee: Mike Hester (New Zealand)

20 February 2010 Friendly	New Zealand	0–3	Australia	Auckland, New Zealand
		Report	Garriock 37'; De Vanna 49'; Khamis 84'	Stadium: Bill McKinlay Park

3 March 2010 Friendly	Australia	2–2	North Korea	Brisbane, Australia
	Gill 50'; De Vanna 68'	Report	Yun Hyon-Hi 14', 86'	Stadium: Spencer Park; Attendance: 0 (closed doors); Referee: Jacqui Melksham

6 March 2010 Friendly	Australia	3–2	North Korea	Brisbane, Australia
	Walsh 25'; Gill 45' (pen.); Simon 90'	Report	Jo Yun Mi 33'; Kim Yong Hui 53'	Stadium: Ballymore Stadium; Referee: Sarah Hodson

==== AFC Women's Asian Cup ====
19 May 2010 Group stage	Australia	2–0	Vietnam	Chengdu, China
	Khamis 29'; Ledbrook 51' (pen.)	Report		Stadium: Chengdu Sports Centre; Attendance: 1,000; Referee: Ri Hyang-ok (North Korea)

21 May 2010 Group stage	South Korea	1–3	Australia	Chengdu, China
	Kang Sun-Mi 71'	Report	Carroll 52'; De Vanna 59'; Kerr 66'	Stadium: Chengdu Sports Centre; Attendance: 600; Referee: Sachiko Yamagishi (Japan)

23 May 2010 Group stage	China	1–0	Australia	Chengdu, China
	Zhang Rui 9'	Report		Stadium: Chengdu Sports Centre; Attendance: 11,000; Referee: Sachiko Yamagishi (Japan)

27 May 2010 Semifinal	Japan	0–1	Australia	Chengdu, China
		Report	Gill 45+1'	Stadium: Chengdu Sports Centre; Attendance: 1,200; Referee: Pannipar Kamnueng (Thailand)

30 May 2010 Final	Australia	1–1 (a.e.t.) (5–4 p)	North Korea	Chengdu, China
	Kerr 19'	Report	Jo Yun-Mi 73'	Stadium: Chengdu Sports Centre; Attendance: 1,200; Referee: Sachiko Yamagichi (Japan)
	Penalties
	Shipard (penalty scored); Ledbrook (penalty scored); Gill (penalty scored); Garriock (penalty scored); Simon (penalty scored)		(penalty scored) Jo Yun-mi; (penalty missed) Yun Song-Mi; (penalty scored) Choe Yong-Sim; (penalty scored) Yu Jong-Hui; (penalty scored) Mun Chol-Mi

=== Women's under-20 ===
==== Friendlies ====
25 July 2009	South Korea	0–0	Australia	Seoul, South Korea
		Report		Stadium: KFA National Training Centre

27 July 2009	South Korea	3–1	Australia	Seoul, South Korea
	Ji So-yun 15'; Kim Na-rae 68'; Kong Hye-won 69'	Report	Sykes 61'	Stadium: KFA National Training Centre

==== AFC U-19 Women's Championship ====
1 August 2009 Group stage	Japan	1–1	Australia	Wuhan, China
	Iwabuchi 66'	Report	Simon 88'	Stadium: Hankou Cultural Sports Centre; Attendance: 1,500; Referee: Hong Eun-ah (South Korea

3 August 2009 Group stage	Australia	1–2	China	Wuhan, China
	Simon 75'	Report	Lou 10'; An 42'	Stadium: Hankou Cultural Sports Centre; Attendance: 3,500; Referee: Bentla D'Coth (India)

5 August 2009 Group stage	Chinese Taipei	0–4	Australia	Wuhan, China
		Report	Clifford 21'; Simon 58'; Beutel 66'; Bolger 84'	Stadium: Xinhua Road Sports Center; Referee: Ri Hong-sil (North Korea)

=== Australia U-17 ===
==== AFF U-16 Women's Championship ====
10 October 2009 Group stage	Philippines	0–14	Australia	Yangon, Myanmar
		Report	Allen 7', 70'; Makrillos 13', 15'; Kerr 38'; Kennedy 43', 60', 73', 90'; Friend 44', 79', 81'; Faul 55'; Whitfield 85'	Stadium: Bogyoke Aung San Stadium

12 October 2009 Group stage	Australia	5–0	Vietnam	Yangon, Myanmar
	Bolger 18'; Friend 21', 58'; Foord 30'; Whitfield 52'	Report		Stadium: Thuwunna Stadium

16 October 2009 Semifinal	Australia	6–1	Myanmar	Yangon, Myanmar
	Friend 1'; Kerr 40'; Kennedy 43'; Andrews 58'; Whitfield 78' van Egmond 81' (pen.)	Report	10'	Stadium: Thuwunna Stadium

18 October 2009 Final	Thailand	0–8	Australia	Yangon, Myanmar
		Report	Whitfield 30'; Foord 59', 89'; Kerr 67', 82'; Makrillos 75'; Allen 88' van Egmond 90'	Stadium: Thuwunna Stadium

==== AFC U-16 Women's Championship ====
5 November 2009 Group stage	Australia	4–0	China	Bangkok, Thailand
	Andrews 18', 58', 63', 87'	Report		Stadium: Supachalasai Stadium

7 November 2009 Group stage	Chinese Taipei	0–7	Australia	Bangkok, Thailand
		Report	Stott 3'; Makrillos 5'; Brown 12'; Hatzirodos 19', 33'; Foord 42', 90'	Stadium: Supachalasai Stadium

9 November 2009 Group stage	Japan	1–3	Australia	Bangkok, Thailand
	Oda 7'	Report	Whitfield 13'; Allen 28'; Foord 45'	Stadium: Supachalasai Stadium

12 November 2009 Semifinal	Australia	3–4	North Korea	Bangkok, Thailand
	Whitfield 7'; Foord 27' van Egmond 62'	Report	Kim Kum-jong 17', 77'; Pong Son-hwa 37'; Kim Yun-mi 85'	Stadium: Supachalasai Stadium

15 November 2009 Third-place playoff	Japan	6–2	Australia	Bangkok, Thailand
	Kyokawa 31', 52', 69', 87'; Naomoto 45'; Takagi 83'	Report	Andrews 59'; Foord 85'	Stadium: Supachalasai Stadium

== A-League ==
=== Table ===
Pos	Team	Pld	W	D	L	GF	GA	GD	Pts	Qualification
1	Sydney FC (C)	27	15	3	9	35	23	+12	48	Qualification for 2011 AFC Champions League group stage and Finals series
2	Melbourne Victory	27	14	5	8	47	32	+15	47	Qualification for 2011 AFC Champions League group stage and Finals series
3	Gold Coast United	27	13	5	9	39	35	+4	44	Qualification for Finals series
4	Wellington Phoenix	27	10	10	7	37	29	+8	40	Qualification for Finals series
5	Perth Glory	27	11	6	10	40	34	+6	39	Qualification for Finals series
6	Newcastle Jets	27	10	4	13	33	45	−12	34	Qualification for Finals series
7	North Queensland Fury	27	8	8	11	29	46	−17	32	
8	Central Coast Mariners	27	7	9	11	32	29	+3	30	
9	Brisbane Roar	27	8	6	13	32	42	−10	30	
10	Adelaide United	27	7	8	12	24	33	−9	29	

Source: ultimatealeague.com
Rules for classification: 1) points; 2) goal difference; 3) number of goals scored.
(C) Champions

=== Final series ===
Elimination finals
3	Gold Coast United	0 (5)
6	Newcastle Jets (p.s.o.)	0 (6)
4	Wellington Phoenix (p.s.o.)	1 (4)
5	Perth Glory	1 (2)

Semifinals
1	Sydney FC	1	2
2	Melbourne Victory	2	2
Wellington Phoenix	3
Newcastle Jets	1

Preliminary final
Sydney FC	4
Wellington Phoenix	2

Grand final
Melbourne Victory	1 (2)
Sydney FC (p.s.o.)	1 (4)

=== 2010 A-League Grand Final ===
20 March 2010
19:00 UTC+11

Melbourne Victory	1 – 1 (a.e.t.)	Sydney FC
Leijer 81'	Report; Summary	Bridge 63'
Penalties
Muscat (penalty missed); Brebner (penalty scored); Angulo (penalty missed); Broxham (penalty scored)	2–4	(penalty scored) Colosimo; (penalty missed) Cole; (penalty scored) Foxe; (penalty scored) Kisel; (penalty scored) Byun

Etihad Stadium, Melbourne
Attendance: 44,560
Referee: Strebre Delovski

== State and Territorial Leagues ==
=== NSW Premier League ===
Pos	Team	Pld	W	D	L	GF	GA	GD	Pts	Qualification or relegation
1	Bonnyrigg White Eagles	22	13	6	3	45	20	+25	45	Qualified for the 2010 NSW Premier League Finals
2	Blacktown City (C)	22	12	4	6	42	27	+15	40	Qualified for the 2010 NSW Premier League Finals
3	Sydney United	22	11	6	5	39	26	+13	39	Qualified for the 2010 NSW Premier League Finals
4	APIA Leichhardt Tigers	22	12	3	7	39	37	+2	39	Qualified for the 2010 NSW Premier League Finals
5	Marconi Stallions	22	11	3	8	26	26	0	36	Qualified for the 2010 NSW Premier League Finals
6	Sutherland Sharks	22	9	4	9	36	29	+7	31	
7	Rockdale City Suns	22	6	12	4	23	23	0	30	
8	Bankstown City	22	7	5	10	37	41	−4	26	
9	Manly United	22	7	4	11	24	31	−7	25	
10	South Coast Wolves	22	6	4	12	32	39	−7	22	
11	Sydney Olympic	22	6	3	13	29	40	−11	21	
12	West Sydney Berries (R)	22	2	6	14	17	50	−33	12	Relegated to the 2011 NSW Super League

Source: socceraust.co.uk, NSW Premier League
Rules for classification: 1) points; 2) goal difference; 3) number of goals scored.
(C) Champions; (R) Relegated

=== NBN State Football League ===
==== Table ====
Pos	Team	Pld	W	D	L	GF	GA	GD	Pts	Qualification or relegation
1	Weston Workers	21	12	4	5	45	24	+21	40	Qualified for Finals
2	Hamilton Olympic	21	12	3	6	49	26	+23	39	Qualified for Finals
3	Edgeworth Eagles	21	11	6	4	49	27	+22	39	Qualified for Finals
4	Valentine Phoenix	21	12	1	8	42	32	+10	37	Qualified for Finals
5	West Wallsend	21	10	5	6	40	35	+5	35	
6	Broadmeadow Magic	21	8	1	12	30	42	−12	25	
7	South Cardiff	21	5	7	9	25	35	−10	22	
8	Toronto Awaba Stags	21	0	1	20	18	77	−59	1	

Updated to match(es) played on unknown. Source:
Rules for classification: 1) points; 2) goal difference; 3) number of goals scored.

==== Final series ====
Semifinal
Weston Bears	0	3	3
Valentine Phoenix	0	1	1
Edgeworth Eagles	1	0	1
Hamilton Olympic Warriors	0	0	0

Final
Weston Bears	2
Edgeworth Eagles	4

=== Queensland State League ===
Pos	Team	Pld	W	D	L	GF	GA	GD	Pts	Qualification
1	Sunshine Coast	21	18	1	2	63	26	+37	55	Qualified for Finals
2	Brisbane Strikers	21	14	3	4	56	21	+35	45	Qualified for Finals
3	Far North Queensland	21	11	2	8	46	40	+6	35	Qualified for Finals
4	North Queensland Razorbacks	21	8	5	8	35	31	+4	29	Qualified for Finals
5	Queensland Academy of Sport	21	7	4	10	46	54	−8	25	
6	Capricorn Cougars	21	6	3	12	28	42	−14	21	
7	Whitsunday Miners	21	4	6	11	29	49	−20	18	
8	Bundaberg Spirit	21	2	4	15	25	65	−40	10	

Updated to match(es) played on 17 March 2010. Source:
Rules for classification: 1) points; 2) goal difference; 3) number of goals scored.

=== Victorian Premier League ===
Pos	Team	Pld	W	D	L	GF	GA	GD	Pts	Qualification or relegation
1	Richmond	22	12	4	6	33	26	+7	40	Victorian Premier League Finals
2	Hume City	22	12	6	4	41	29	+12	39 (Note: Hume City, Heidelberg Utd & Melbourne Knights were given a situation pending 3 point deduction as a result of failure to adhere to Rules of Competition 2009 – Section 1.6. South Melbourne lost 6 points because of an incident during the Round 6 home fixture against Heidelberg United.)	Victorian Premier League Finals
3	Green Gully (C)	22	11	3	8	37	23	+14	36	Victorian Premier League Finals
4	Heidelberg United	22	10	6	6	34	33	+1	33	Victorian Premier League Finals
5	Northcote City	22	9	4	9	47	35	+12	31	Victorian Premier League Finals
6	South Melbourne	22	10	6	6	41	28	+13	30	
7	Oakleigh Cannons	22	9	3	10	30	31	−1	30	
8	Dandenong Thunder	22	9	4	9	24	30	−6	28	
9	Melbourne Knights	22	7	5	10	30	37	−7	23	
10	Bentleigh Greens	22	5	6	11	19	36	−17	21	
11	Altona Magic	22	5	5	12	39	46	−7	20	Relegation to Vic State League Div 1
12	Sunshine George Cross	22	5	4	13	20	41	−21	19	Relegation to Vic State League Div 1

Rules for classification: 1) points; 2) goal difference; 3) number of goals scored.
(C) Champions

=== Tasmanian Southern Premier League ===
Pos	Team	Pld	W	D	L	GF	GA	GD	Pts	Qualification
1	South Hobart	21	18	3	0	61	15	+46	57	Qualify for Finals
2	Hobart Zebras	21	11	5	5	49	38	+11	38	Qualify for Finals
3	Glenorchy Knights	21	10	5	6	40	35	+5	35	Qualify for Finals
4	Clarence United	21	7	7	7	39	41	−2	28	Qualify for Finals
5	New Town Eagles	21	6	6	9	39	40	−1	24	
6	Kingborough Lions United	21	7	3	11	29	39	−10	24	
7	Olympia	21	2	7	12	25	47	−22	13	
8	Taroona	21	3	4	14	23	50	−27	13	Relegation Play-off

Updated to match(es) played on 13 July 2011. Source:
Rules for classification: 1) points; 2) goal difference; 3) number of goals scored.

=== Tasmania Northern Premier League ===
Pos	Team	Pld	W	D	L	GF	GA	GD	Pts	Qualification
1	Northern Rangers	16	12	3	1	56	24	+32	39	Qualified for Finals
2	Devonport City	16	11	3	2	52	26	+26	36	Qualified for Finals
3	Burnie United	16	10	0	6	52	31	+21	30	Qualified for Finals
4	Riverside Olympic	16	9	3	4	47	28	+19	30	Qualified for Finals
5	Prospect Knights	16	7	3	6	46	38	+8	24	
6	Ulverstone	16	7	2	7	44	36	+8	23	
7	Somerset	16	6	0	10	36	55	−19	18	
8	Launceston City	16	2	2	12	35	51	−16	8	
9	Launceston United	16	0	0	16	17	96	−79	0	

Updated to match(es) played on 13 July 2011. Source:
Rules for classification: 1) points; 2) goal difference; 3) number of goals scored.

=== South Australian Super League ===
Pos	Team	Pld	W	D	L	GF	GA	GD	Pts	Qualification or relegation
1	North Eastern MetroStars	18	11	4	3	37	19	+18	37	Qualified for Finals
2	Para Hills Knights	18	9	5	4	28	19	+9	32	Qualified for Finals
3	Adelaide City	18	10	2	6	28	27	+1	32	Qualified for Finals
4	Adelaide Blue Eagles	18	9	4	5	40	25	+15	31	Qualified for Finals
5	Campbelltown City	18	8	5	5	33	23	+10	29	Qualified for Finals
6	Adelaide Galaxy	18	5	7	6	21	24	−3	22	
7	Western Strikers	18	5	7	6	33	38	−5	22	
8	Adelaide Raiders	18	4	6	8	17	23	−6	18	
9	Adelaide Cobras	18	5	2	11	23	39	−16	17	Relegated to South Australian Premier League
10	Cumberland United	18	1	4	13	17	40	−23	7	Relegated to South Australian Premier League

Updated to match(es) played on 13 July 2011. Source:
Rules for classification: 1) points; 2) goal difference; 3) number of goals scored.

=== Football West Premier League ===
Pos	Team	Pld	W	D	L	GF	GA	GD	Pts	Qualification
1	Western Knights	22	12	5	5	49	29	+20	41	Qualified for Finals
2	Stirling Lions	22	11	6	5	37	30	+7	39	Qualified for Finals
3	Perth SC	22	12	2	8	43	39	+4	38	Qualified for Finals
4	Floreat Athena	22	10	6	6	44	29	+15	36	Qualified for Finals
5	ECU Joondalup	22	8	7	7	52	48	+4	31	Qualified for Finals
6	Sorrento	22	8	5	9	38	43	−5	29	
7	Armadale	22	8	4	10	40	42	−2	28	
8	Balcatta	22	8	3	11	34	46	−12	27	
9	Inglewood United	22	7	5	10	34	45	−11	26	
10	Cockburn City	22	7	4	11	36	38	−2	25	
11	Mandurah City	22	7	3	12	33	46	−13	24	
12	Swan United	22	5	8	9	29	34	−5	23	

Updated to match(es) played on 13 July 2011. Source:
Rules for classification: 1) points; 2) goal difference; 3) number of goals scored.

=== ACT Premier League ===
Pos	Team	Pld	W	D	L	GF	GA	GD	Pts	Qualification
1	Canberra	18	12	5	1	57	15	+42	41	Qualified for Finals
2	Belconnen United	18	12	3	3	47	25	+22	39	Qualified for Finals
3	Cooma Tigers	18	9	4	5	34	19	+15	31	Qualified for Finals
4	Canberra City	18	8	3	7	33	25	+8	27	Qualified for Finals
5	Monaro Panthers	18	8	2	8	29	32	−3	26	
6	Canberra Olympic	18	6	5	7	26	30	−4	23	
7	Woden Valley	18	6	1	11	27	46	−19	19	
8	Tuggeranong United	18	5	4	9	22	47	−25	19	
9	Goulburn Strikers	18	4	4	10	27	37	−10	16	
10	Australian National University	18	3	3	12	12	17	−5	12	

Updated to match(es) played on 7 July 2011. Source:
Rules for classification: 1) points; 2) goal difference; 3) number of goals scored.

=== Northern Zone Premier League ===
Pos	Team	Pld	W	D	L	GF	GA	GD	Pts
1	Darwin Olympic	21	18	2	1	111	24	+87	56
2	Casuarina	21	15	2	4	75	36	+39	47
3	Port Darwin	21	9	5	7	48	42	+6	32
4	Hellenic Athletic	21	9	4	8	47	51	−4	31
5	NAU Rangers	21	8	3	10	44	52	−8	27
6	Palmerston	21	7	3	11	37	48	−11	24
7	Darwin Dragons	21	6	1	14	34	76	−42	19
8	Padres FC	21	2	0	19	26	93	−67	6

Updated to match(es) played on 13 July 2011. Source:
Rules for classification: 1) points; 2) goal difference; 3) number of goals scored.

== Honors ==
Competition	Winner	Details
A-League Grand Final	Sydney FC	
A-League Premiership	Sydney FC	
NSW Premier League Champions	TBD	
NBN State Football League Premiership	TBD	
Queensland State Football League Premiership	TBD	
Queensland State Football League Grand Final	TBD	
Victorian Premier League Premiership	TBD	
Northern Premier League Champions	TBD	
Southern Premier League Champions	TBD	
Football West Premier League Champions	TBD	
ACT Premier League Champions	TBD	
ACT Premier League Grand Final	TBD	
NorZone Premier League Champions	TBD	
South Australian Super League Champions	TBD	
Tasmanian Statewide Cup	TBD	
Capital Football Federation Cup	TBD	
Football NSW McDonald's Cup	TBD	

== Australian clubs in Asia ==
=== Summary ===
Club	Competition	Final round
Melbourne Victory	2010 AFC Champions League	Group Stage
Adelaide United	2010 AFC Champions League	Round of 16

Win Tie Loss

=== Melbourne Victory ===
23 February 2010 2010 Champions League Group E	Beijing Guoan (China)	1–0	(Australia) Melbourne Victory	Beijing, China
19:30 UTC+8	Griffiths 52'	(Report)		Stadium: Workers Stadium; Attendance: 31,000; Referee: Ali Hamad Al-Badwawi (United Arab Emirates)

9 March 2010 2010 Champions League Group E	Melbourne Victory (Australia)	0–2	(South Korea) Seongnam Ilhwa Chunma	Melbourne, Australia
19:30 UTC+11		(Report)	Ogenovski 40'; Yun 85'	Stadium: Etihad Stadium; Attendance: 7,899; Referee: Nawaf Abdulla (Bahrain)

23 March 2010 2010 Champions League Group E	Kawasaki Frontale (Japan)	4–0	(Australia) Melbourne Victory	Kawasaki, Japan
19:00 UTC+9	Jong Tae-Se 3'; Kurotsu 11'; Renatinho 22'; Taniguchi 90'	(Report)		Stadium: Todoroki Athletics Stadium; Attendance: 9,728

31 March 2010 2010 Champions League Group E	Melbourne Victory (Australia)	1–0	(Japan) Kawasaki Frontale	Melbourne, Australia
19:30 UTC+11	Muscat 60' (pen.)	(Report)		Stadium: Etihad Stadium; Attendance: 6,011; Referee: Saeid Mozaffarizadeh (Iran)

14 April 2010 2010 Champions League Group E	Melbourne Victory (Australia)	0–0	(China) Beijing Guoan	Melbourne, Australia
19:30 UTC+10		(Report)		Stadium: Etihad Stadium; Attendance: 6,394; Referee: Abdul Malik Bashir (Singapore)

28 April 2010 2010 Champions League Group E	Seongnam Ilhwa Chunma (South Korea)	3–2	(Australia) Melbourne Victory	Seongnam, South Korea
19:00 UTC+9	Jeon 27'; Nam 72'; Jo 83'	(Report)	Dugandžić 46'; Pondeljak	Stadium: Tancheon Sports Complex; Attendance: 502; Referee: Mohamed Abdelkarim (United Arab Emirates)

=== Adelaide United ===
24 February 2010 2010 Champions League Group H	Adelaide United (Australia)	1–0	(South Korea) Pohang Steelers	Adelaide, Australia
19:30 UTC+10:30	Leckie 45+1'	(Report)		Stadium: Hindmarsh Stadium; Attendance: 8,374; Referee: Mohsen Basma (Syria)

10 March 2010 2010 Champions League Group H	Shandong Luneng (China)	0–2	(Australia) Adelaide United	Jinan, China
15:30 UTC+8		(Report)	van Dijk 27'; Leckie 70'	Stadium: Shandong Stadium; Attendance: 22,176; Referee: Alireza Faghani (Iran)

24 March 2010 2010 Champions League Group H	Adelaide United (Australia)	3–2	(Japan) Sanfrecce Hiroshima	Adelaide, Australia
19:30 UTC+10:30	Dodd 12'; Cornthwaite 79'; Cássio 82'	(Report)	Morisaki 55'; Takayangi 76'	Stadium: Hindmarsh Stadium; Attendance: 12,841; Referee: Subkhiddin Mohd Salleh (Malaysia)

30 March 2010 2010 Champions League Group H	Sanfrecce Hiroshima (Japan)	1–0	(Australia) Adelaide United	Hiroshima, Japan
19:00 UTC+9	Satō 45'	(Report)		Stadium: Hiroshima Big Arch; Attendance: 12,094; Referee: Ali Hamad Al-Badwawi (United Arab Emirates)

13 April 2010 2010 Champions League Group H	Pohang Steelers (South Korea)	0–0	(Australia) Adelaide United	Pohang, South Korea
19:30 UTC+9		(Report)		Stadium: Steelyard Stadium; Attendance: 8,217; Referee: Ravshan Irmatov (Uzbekistan)

27 April 2010 2010 Champions League Group H	Adelaide United (Australia)	0–1	(China) Shandong Luneng	Adelaide, Australia
19:30 UTC+9:30		(Report)	Wei 53'	Stadium: Hindmarsh Stadium; Attendance: 10,313; Referee: Nawaf Abdulla (Bahrain)

12 May 2010 2010 Champions League Round of 16	Adelaide United (Australia)	2 – 3 (a.e.t.)	(South Korea) Jeonbuk Hyundai Motors	Adelaide, Australia
19:30 UTC+9:30	Cornthwaite 78' van Dijk 90+5'	(Report)	Eninho 38', 88'; Lee 116'	Stadium: Hindmarsh Stadium; Attendance: 12,015; Referee: Abdulrahman Abdou (Qatar)
