= 2008 Football Northern Territory season =

Football Northern Territory
- Season: 2008

The 2008 Football Northern Territory season in Northern Territory in Australia lasted from late April to mid-September. The men's competitions consisted of two major divisions across the State.

== League table ==
=== 2008 North Zone Premier League ===
The season began on 26 April, concluding with the Grand Final on 13 September.

Pos	Team	Pld	W	D	L	GF	GA	GD	Pts	Qualification
1	Darwin Olympic (C)	14	13	0	1	69	11	+58	39	Qualification to Final Series
2	Casuarina	14	12	1	1	38	10	+28	37	Qualification to Final Series
3	Hellenic	14	10	1	3	46	21	+25	31	Qualification to Final Series
4	Port Darwin	14	6	1	7	28	20	+8	19	Qualification to Final Series
5	Nakara Azzurri	14	4	2	8	31	28	+3	14	
6	Darwin Dragons	14	4	0	10	23	43	−20	12	
7	Mindil Padres	14	3	1	10	12	52	−40	10	
8	Palmerston	14	1	0	13	13	75	−62	3	

Source: socceraust
Rules for classification: 1) Points won; 2) Total goal difference; 3) Total goals scored;
(C) Champions

=== Finals series ===
Semi-finals
1	Darwin Olympic	3
2	Casuarina	1
3	Hellenic	1
4	Port Darwin	4

Preliminary Final
Casuarina	1 (6)
Port Darwin	1 (5)

Grand Final
Darwin Olympic	2
Casuarina	0

=== 2008 South Zone A Grade ===
The season began on 27 April, concluding on 31 August.

Pos	Team	Pld	W	D	L	GF	GA	GD	Pts
1	Verdi FC (C)	9	7	0	2	33	9	+24	21
2	Scorpions FC	9	4	1	4	27	20	+7	13
3	Probuild United	9	3	1	5	12	36	−24	10
4	Vikings FC	9	3	0	6	18	25	−7	9

Source: socceraust
Rules for classification: 1) Points won; 2) Total goal difference; 3) Total goals scored;
(C) Champions

=== Finals series ===
Semi-finals
1	Verdi FC
2	Scorpions FC
3	Probuild United
4	Vikings FC

Preliminary Final
Scorpions FC
Vikings FC

Grand Final
Verdi FC	4
Vikings FC	1
