= Graham Harvey (football manager) =

English association football manager

Personal information
- Date of birth: 11 February 1984 (age 42)
- Place of birth: Watford, England
- Position: Defender

Team information
- Current team: Redlands United (technical director)

Youth career
- Stevenage Borough

Senior career*
Years	Team	Apps	(Gls)
- Eastleigh
- Whitsunday Miners

Managerial career
- Brisbane Strikers
- Whitsunday Miners
- 2015–2018: Western Pride
- 2018–2019: Eastern (assistant)
- China Women U16 (assistant)
- Guam (assistant)
- 2019–: Redlands United (technical director)
- 2021: Kaya–Iloilo
- 2026–: Cambodia (assistant)
- * Club domestic league appearances and goals

Graham Harvey (born 11 February 1984) is an English football manager and former player who is the technical director of Australian club Redlands United.

== Club career ==
After being released by Stevenage Borough as a youth player, Harvey played semi-professional football for Eastleigh, as well as Whitsunday Miners in Australia.

== Managerial career ==
After graduating with a Masters in Sports Coaching from Loughborough University, Harvey worked at a number of English clubs as a youth coach. His first foray into management came in Australia, where he managed Brisbane Strikers, Whitsunday Miners and most notably Western Pride.

Following his managerial stints in Australia, Harvey was appointed assistant manager at Hong Kong club Eastern. He left this role in 2019 and returned to Australia joining Redlands United as their technical director. He also went on to work as assistant for the China women's under-16 football team, as well as the Guam national football team.

In June 2021, he was appointed manager of Filipino side Kaya–Iloilo under a short-term contract to lead the club's debut campaign in the AFC Champions League. His first game in charge was the play-off round, where they defeated Shanghai Port 1–0 to qualify for the competition proper. However, Kaya lost all their matches in Group F, which contained defending champions Ulsan Hyundai, Thai League 1 champions BG Pathum United, and V.League 1 champions Viettel FC. At the end of his contract, Harvey returned to Redlands United.

== Career statistics ==
=== Managerial ===
As of match played on 11 July 2021

Managerial record by team and tenure
Team	From	To	Record				
Team	From	To	P	W	D	L	Win %
Kaya–Iloilo	9 June 2021	17 July 2021	7	1	0	6	14.3
Total			7	1	0	6	14.3
