= 2007 Football Northern Territory season =

Football Northern Territory
- Season: 2007

The 2007 Football Northern Territory season in Northern Territory in Australia lasted from 22 April to 16 September. The men's competitions consisted of two major divisions across the State.

== League table ==
=== 2007 North Zone Premier League ===
The season began on 22 April, concluding with the Grand Final on 23 September.

Pos	Team	Pld	W	D	L	GF	GA	GD	Pts	Qualification
1	Casuarina (C)	15	9	3	3	51	21	+30	30	Qualification to Final Series
2	Darwin Olympic	15	10	0	5	56	29	+27	30	Qualification to Final Series
3	Port Darwin	15	10	0	5	39	28	+11	30	Qualification to Final Series
4	Nakara Azzurri	15	9	1	5	40	37	+3	28	Qualification to Final Series
5	Hellenic	15	3	3	9	27	38	−11	12	
6	Darwin Dragons	15	0	1	14	18	78	−60	1	

Source: socceraust
Rules for classification: 1) Points won; 2) Total goal difference; 3) Total goals scored;
(C) Champions

=== Finals series ===
Semi-finals
1	Casuarina	1
2	Darwin Olympic	3
3	Port Darwin	3
4	Nakara Azzurri	4

Preliminary Final
Casuarina	6
Nakara Azzurri	1

Grand Final
Darwin Olympic	1
Casuarina	3

=== 2007 South Zone A Grade ===
The season began on 22 April, concluding with the Grand Final on 16 September.

Pos	Team	Pld	W	D	L	GF	GA	GD	Pts
1	Federals (C)	15	12	1	2	46	21	+25	37
2	Verdi FC	15	11	1	3	35	11	+24	34
3	Vikings FC	15	3	2	10	25	47	−22	11
4	Scorpions FC	15	1	2	12	29	56	−27	5

Source: socceraust
Rules for classification: 1) Points won; 2) Total goal difference; 3) Total goals scored;
(C) Champions

=== Finals series ===
Semi-finals
1	Federals	0
2	Verdi FC	1
3	Vikings FC	1
4	Scorpions FC	2

Preliminary Final
Federals	5
Scorpions FC	2

Grand Final
Verdi FC	0
Federals	1
