= Queensland State League =

Queensland State League may refer to:

- Queensland State League (association football), a statewide semi-professional association football league
- Queensland State League (Australian rules football), a Brisbane-based semi-professional Australian rules football league
- Queensland State League (basketball), a statewide semi-professional basketball league
