= Spirit FC =

Spirit FC may refer to:

In Australia

- Bundaberg Spirit FC, an association football team from Bundaberg
- Fremantle Spirit FC, an association football team from Fremantle
- GHFA Spirit FC, the association football team of the Gladesville-Hornsby Football Association, Sydney
- Northern Spirit FC, a former National Soccer League team from North Sydney, disbanded 2004

In New Zealand

- Coastal Spirit FC, an association football team from Christchurch.
- Southland Spirit FC, an association football team from Invercargill.
