= Remo Buess =

Swiss footballer (born 1977)

Personal information
- Full name: Remo Buess
- Date of birth: 13 September 1977 (age 49)
- Place of birth: Basel, Switzerland
- Height: 1.83 m (6 ft 0 in)
- Positions: Defender; left back

Team information
- Current team: Brisbane Roar

Youth career
- 1990–1993: SV Sissach
- 1993–1996: FC Basel

Senior career*
Years	Team	Apps	(Gls)
1996–1998	FC Basel	2	(0)
1998–1999	FC Concordia Basel	16	(3)
1999–2000	SV Muttenz	12	(4)
2000–2001	Neuchâtel Xamax	97	(2)
2003–2004	FC Zürich	10	(0)
2005–2007	Queensland Roar	28	(0)
2009	Logan United FC		

International career
	Switzerland U19	2	(0)

Managerial career
- 2010–: Brisbane Roar (Youth Asst)
- Kelvin Grove State College
- * Club domestic league appearances and goals as of 18 October 2007

Remo Buess (born 13 September 1977) is a Swiss former footballer who played as defender in the late 1990s and in the 2000s. He then turned trainer and runs his own football academy.

== Club career ==
Buess played his youth football by local club SV Sissach and in 1993 he moved to the youth department of FC Basel. Buess advanced to Basel's first team for their 1996–97 season, signing his first professional contract, under head coach Karl Engel. After appearing in two test games Buess played his domestic league debut for the club in the away game in the Letzigrund on 7 September 1996 as Basel played a 1–1 draw with Zürich. However he played most of the season and the following with the U-21 team. In order to obtain more playing time, for the season 1998–99 Buess was loaned out to local semi-professional club Concordia Basel and for the season 1999–2000 he was loaned out to SV Muttenz, both of whom played in the third tear of Swiss football. Buess's contract with Basel ended in June 2000. During his time with Basel, Buess played a total of six games for their first team without scoring a goal, two of these games were in the Nationalliga A and four were friendly games.

In summer 2000–01 Buess moved on a free transfer to Neuchâtel Xamax. Here he became a regular in the starting eleven. In the 2002–03 Swiss Cup Xamax reached the final, in which Buess played the entire 90 minutes, but Xamax were beaten 6–0 by his former Club Basel. Buess stayed with Xamax for three seasons and then transferred to FC Zürich. In the season 2004–05 Zürich reached the cup final, this was played on 16 May 2005 in the St. Jakob-Park in Basel and Zürich won the match 3–1. Although Buess did not play in the game itself, he is cup winner because he was in the squad on that day. Buess stayed two seasons and then moved to Australia.

He previously played for the Queensland Roar in the A-League. A move to New Zealand Knights was proposed during the November 2006 transfer window, but did not eventuate. On 24 January 2007, Buess was released by Queensland Roar as the club had too many foreign players in its squad. He wanted to join the New Zealand Knights in A-League 2007–08 season but the club failed to enter a team. In 2009 Buess played for Logan United FC in the Hyundai Queensland Soccer League where he was Captain.

== Managerial career ==
He was the Director of Coaching at Kenmore Football Club in the western suburbs of Brisbane before recently linking with his former club, Brisbane Roar, where he has taken up the position of Assistant Coach of the Roar's Youth Team. He is also the manager of Brisbane Boys' College 1st XI Football team and a specialist coach at St Peters Lutheran College.

Remo Buess runs his own football academy called 'The Soccer Factory'.

== Sources ==
- Die ersten 125 Jahre. Publisher: Josef Zindel im Friedrich Reinhardt Verlag, Basel. ISBN 978-3-7245-2305-5
- Verein "Basler Fussballarchiv" Homepage
