= Whitsunday Miners FC =

Whitsunday Miners F.C.
- Full name: Whitsunday Miners Football Club
- Nickname: Miners
- Founded: 2008
- Ground: Stadium Mackay
- Capacity: 12,200
- Owner: Bernadette Moloney
- Chairman: Unknown
- Senior Men's Manager: Graham Harvey
- League: Queensland State League
- QSL 2011: 3rd

Whitsunday Miners Football Club were an Australian association football club based in Mackay, Queensland. They played in the Queensland State League and were founded in 2008.

== History ==
Since being founded in 2008, the Whitsunday Miners have played in the Queensland State League, although success hasn't been strong for them, having two shaky seasons since their foundation. In the 2008 QSL competition, The Miners finished 9th out of 10 teams, finishing one point behind Logan United and just above Bundaberg Spirit. In the 2009 season they once more failed to make an impact on a longer season, finishing 10th out of 11, with Bundaberg Spirit finishing below them once more.

In the 2011 QSL season, the Miners have progressed to Round 2 of the QSL Finals after finishing third overall behind Sunshine Coast and Brisbane Strikers. The Whitsunday Miners knocked out Gold Coast Stars in 3–1 win at the new Mackay Stadium and now look to the Far North Queensland Bulls to play for a spot in the final.

== Current squad ==
Note: Flags indicate national team as defined under FIFA eligibility rules; some limited exceptions apply. Players may hold more than one non-FIFA nationality.

No.	Pos.	Nation	Player
1	GK	NIR	Aodhan Campbell
2	DF	ENG	Matt Oldring
3	DF	RSA	Kyle McBurney
4	DF	AUS	Corey Hooper
5	DF	ENG	Michael Leslie
8	MF	AUS	Tim Curtain
9	DF	AUS	Brett Neeve
10	MF	ENG	Bill Puckett
11	FW	AUS	Mick Van Moolenbrock

No.	Pos.	Nation	Player
12	MF	AUS	Warrick Jansen
13	MF	AUS	Matthew Zappone
14	FW	ENG	Harry Pagan
15	MF	ENG	Clark Bradford
16	FW	AUS	Joseph Civello
17	DF	ENG	Dean Faithfull
18	FW	FRA	Arnold Mouako
19	MF	AUS	Josh Drinkwater
20	GK	AUS	Robbie McGill
