= Chay Hews =

Australian soccer player

Personal information
- Full name: Chay Hews
- Date of birth: 30 September 1976 (age 50)
- Place of birth: Toowoomba, Australia
- Height: 1.77 m (5 ft 10 in)
- Position: Midfielder

Team information
- Current team: Rochedale Rovers

Youth career
- QAS

Senior career*
Years	Team	Apps	(Gls)
1994–1999	Brisbane Strikers FC	75	(1)
1999	Bellmare Hiratsuka	12	(1)
1999–2001	Brisbane Strikers FC	33	(2)
2001	IF Sylvia		
2001	Carlisle United	5	(2)
2002–2004	IF Sylvia		
2005–2008	Västra Frölunda IF		
2008–2014	Brisbane Strikers FC		
2015	Rochedale Rovers	14	(0)
- * Club domestic league appearances and goals

Chay Hews (born 30 September 1976) is a former Australian soccer player who played in Australia, England, Japan and Sweden.

== Playing career ==
Hews began his senior career with Brisbane Strikers in the National Soccer League (NSL) in 1994.

Hews joined Bellmare Hiratsuka in July 1999, making his J-League debut the following month.

He returned to Australia in late 1999, making his return to the Brisbane Strikers in January 2000 after a wait for an international clearance.

In mid 2000, Hews moved to Sweden, spending six months away from football. He returned to the Strikers in December 2000, signing a contract until the end of the 2000–01 National Soccer League season.

In 2001, Hews joined Football League Division Three team Carlisle United. He was released in October, having made five appearances and scoring two goals.

== Club statistics ==
Club performance			League		Cup		League Cup		Total	
Season	Club	League	Apps	Goals	Apps	Goals	Apps	Goals	Apps	Goals
Australia			League		NSL Cup		N/A		Total	
1994–1995	Brisbane Strikers	National Soccer League	4	0			-	-		
1995–1996	Brisbane Strikers	National Soccer League	15	0			-	-		
1996–1997	Brisbane Strikers	National Soccer League	18	0			-	-		
1997–1998	Brisbane Strikers	National Soccer League	23	0			-	-		
1998–1999	Brisbane Strikers	National Soccer League	19	1			-	-		
Japan			League		Emperor's Cup		J.League Cup		Total	
1999	Bellmare Hiratsuka	J1 League	12	1	0	0	0	0	12	1
Australia			League		NSL Cup		N/A		Total	
1999–2000	Brisbane Strikers	National Soccer League	16	2			-	-		
2000–2001	Brisbane Strikers	National Soccer League	17	0			-	-		
England			League		FA Cup		Football League Cup		Total	
2001–2002	Carlisle United	Football League Division Three	5	2	0	0	-	-	5	2

== Honours ==
Brisbane Strikers

- National Soccer League Champion: 1996–97
