= Alun Evans (New Zealand footballer) =

New Zealand footballer

Personal information
- Full name: Alun Evans
- Date of birth: 17 February 1965 (age 61)
- Place of birth: New Zealand
- Position: Defender

Senior career*
Years	Team	Apps	(Gls)
1993–1995	Brisbane Strikers	34	(1)

International career
1992–1995	New Zealand	17	(0)
- * Club domestic league appearances and goals

Alun Evans (born 17 February 1965) is an association football player who represented New Zealand at the international level.

Evans made his full All Whites debut in a 3–0 win over Fiji on 7 June 1992 and ended his international playing career with 17 A-international caps to his credit, his final cap coming in a 0–3 loss to Australia on 15 November 1995.
