= Glenn Gwynne =

Australian soccer player

Personal information
- Date of birth: 22 February 1972 (age 54)
- Place of birth: Mossman, Australia
- Position: Defender

Senior career*
Years	Team	Apps	(Gls)
1991–1993	Brisbane United	47	(0)
1993–1995	Parramatta Eagles	46	(1)
1995–2001	Brisbane Strikers	109	(1)
Total		202	(2)

International career
1998	Australia	2	(0)
Medal record
Representing Australia
Men's Association football
OFC Nations Cup
Runner-up	1998 Australia
- * Club domestic league appearances and goals

Glenn Gwynne (born 22 February 1972) is an Australian former soccer player who played at both professional and international levels as a defender.

== Career ==
Born in Mossman, Gwynne played at club level in Australia for Brisbane United, Parramatta Eagles and Brisbane Strikers.

He also earned two caps for Australia in 1998.

== Honours ==
Australia

- OFC Nations Cup: runner-up 1998
