= Denis Daluri =

South Sudanese footballer

Personal information
- Full name: Denis Yongule Daluri
- Date of birth: 3 June 1998 (age 28)
- Place of birth: Sudan (now South Sudan)
- Position: Midfielder

Youth career
- Brisbane City

Senior career*
Years	Team	Apps	(Gls)
2017	Green Gully	6	(0)
2018	Brisbane Strikers	3	(0)
2019	Geelong SC	25	(5)
2020–2021	Eastern Lions	20	(1)
2022	Lija Athletic	6	(0)

International career^{‡}
2019–	South Sudan	4	(0)
- * Club domestic league appearances and goals as of 6 March 2022 ‡ National team caps and goals as of 16 November 2020

Denis Yongule Daluri (born 3 June 1998) is a South Sudanese professional footballer who most recently played as a midfielder for Maltese Challenge League club Lija Athletic and the South Sudan national team.

== Club career ==
Daluri previously played for Geelong SC, Brisbane Strikers and Green Gully.

On 20 January 2022, Maltese second-tier club Lija Athletic announced Daluri's signing.

== International career ==
Daluri made his debut for South Sudan on September 4, 2019, in a 2022 FIFA World Cup qualifier against Equatorial Guinea.

=== International statistics ===
South Sudan
Year	Apps	Goals
2019	3	0
2020	1	0
Total	4	0

== Personal life ==
In addition to being a South Sudanese national, Yongule is a naturalised citizen of Australia due to his family's permanent relocation there.
