= Reggie Davani =

Papua New Guinean footballer (born 1980)

Reginald Davani
Personal information
- Full name: Reginald Davani
- Date of birth: 5 February 1980 (age 46)
- Place of birth: Port Moresby, Papua New Guinea
- Height: 1.80 m (5 ft 11 in)
- Positions: Attacking midfielder; midfielder; striker

Team information
- Current team: Western Pride FC (assistant manager)

Youth career
- 1996–1997: Brisbane Lions

Senior career*
Years	Team	Apps	(Gls)
1996–1997	Queensland Lions	48	(35)
1998	Ipswich Knights	23	(15)
1999–2000	Queensland Lions	35	(12)
2001	Taringa Rovers	12	(4)
2001–2002	University Inter	40	(28)
2003	Metro FC	13	(12)
2003–2006	North Shore United	58	(39)
2004–2006	→ Bay Olympic (loan)	40	(6)
2007–2008	Auckland City	14	(8)
2008	Kossa FC	8	(0)
2009	Hume City	11	(5)
2009–2010	Logan United	14	(4)
2010–2011	Brisbane Olympic	15	(5)
2011	Sunshine George Cross		
2012–2015	Morobe Kumuls		

International career
1998–2012	Papua New Guinea	17	(13)

Managerial career
- 2014–2017: Papua New Guinea (assistant manager)
- 2018–: Western Pride FC (assistant manager)
- * Club domestic league appearances and goals

Reginald Davani (born 5 February 1980) is a former Papua New Guinea footballer, who is currently acting as senior men's coach at Western Pride FC.

He is Papua New Guinea's all-time record international goal scorer with 13 goals.

== Club career ==
Davani was a product of the then Brisbane Lions (now Queensland Lions Soccer Club) youth team, before graduating to the senior side. In 1999, he moved to Ipswich Knights, scoring 15 goals in 23 matches, and Taringa Rovers. He then spent several seasons in the New Zealand football leagues, most notably at Auckland City. Davani then transferred to Solomon Islands side Kossa FC, with whom he won a runners-up medal in the 2007–08 OFC Champions League, before moving to Coburg United in Australia's Victorian Premier League for the remainder of the 2008 season. After his release from Logan United, in June 2010 Davani joined Brisbane Olympic. Just before the commencement of the 2011 season, Davani joined Victorian club Sunshine George Cross.

== International career ==
Davani made his debut for the Papua New Guinea national football team in 1998 at the Melanesian Cup in Santo Vanuatu, against the Solomon Islands. He played in four World Cup qualification games in 2004, in which he scored 6 goals. He currently holds the record for the most International goals for Papua New Guinea (13). His younger brother Alex Davani, also plays for the national team. Davani is a dual International, having represented Australia in futsal and was a member of the 2008 Australian Futsal World Cup squad.

=== International goals ===
Scores and results list Papua New Guinea's goal tally first, score column indicates score after each Papua New Guinea goal.

No.	Date	Venue	Opponent	Score	Result	Competition	Ref.
1	12 March 2002	National Soccer Stadium, Apia, Samoa	New Caledonia	4–1	4–1	2002 OFC Nations Cup qualification	
2	14 March 2002	National Soccer Stadium, Apia, Samoa	Tonga	3–0	5–0	2002 OFC Nations Cup qualification	
3	18 March 2002	National Soccer Stadium, Apia, Samoa	American Samoa	1–0	7–0	2002 OFC Nations Cup qualification	
4	18 March 2002	National Soccer Stadium, Apia, Samoa	American Samoa	2–0	7–0	2002 OFC Nations Cup qualification	
5	18 March 2002	National Soccer Stadium, Apia, Samoa	American Samoa	4–0	7–0	2002 OFC Nations Cup qualification	
6	9 July 2002	North Harbour Stadium, Albany, New Zealand	Tahiti	1–1	1–3	2002 OFC Nations Cup	
7	12 May 2004	National Soccer Stadium, Apia, Samoa	Fiji	1–1	2–4	2006 FIFA World Cup qualification	
8	17 May 2004	National Soccer Stadium, Apia, Samoa	American Samoa	1–0	10–0	2006 FIFA World Cup qualification	
9	17 May 2004	National Soccer Stadium, Apia, Samoa	American Samoa	2–0	10–0	2006 FIFA World Cup qualification	
10	17 May 2004	National Soccer Stadium, Apia, Samoa	American Samoa	7–0	10–0	2006 FIFA World Cup qualification	
11	17 May 2004	National Soccer Stadium, Apia, Samoa	American Samoa	10–0	10–0	2006 FIFA World Cup qualification	
12	19 May 2004	National Soccer Stadium, Apia, Samoa	Samoa	1–0	4–1	2006 FIFA World Cup qualification	
13	13 July 2007	Lawson Tama Stadium, Honiara, Solomon Islands	Solomon Islands	1–2	1–2	Friendly	

== Coaching career ==
Davani was Papua New Guinea Assistant coach between 2014 and 2017. During this time Papua New Guinea finished runners up in the OFC Nations Cup.

Davani returned to Ipswich in 2018 to become the Senior Men's Assistant coach and U20 Men's coach at Western Pride FC. Davani became the acting-Senior Men's coach after the departure of Graham Harvey.

== Honours ==
=== Club ===
University Inter

- Port Moresby Premier League: 2001, 2003

Auckland City

- New Zealand Football Championship: 2005, 2006
- Oceania Club Championship: 2005

Bay Olympic

- New Zealand Nth Premier League: 2006

Kossa FC

- Australian Futsal National (Queensland Men's): 2001

=== Individual ===
2005 Finalist – Papua New Guinean Sportsman of the Year
2004 Finalist – Oceania Player of the Year
2004 Players Player of the Year – Bay Olympic NZ
2001 Port Moresby Soccer Association Striker of the Year
1999 OFC Futsal All-Star Team
1998 Alitalia Young Rising Star Award – Australian Futsal National League
All Time Top Scorer – PNG National Team (15 Goals)
