= Andy Pengelly =

Australian soccer player

Personal information
- Full name: Andrew Pengelly
- Date of birth: 19 July 1997 (age 29)
- Place of birth: Ipswich, Australia
- Position: Striker

Team information
- Current team: Lions FC
- Number: 9

Youth career
- Lions FC
- University of Queensland FC
- Western Pride

Senior career*
Years	Team	Apps	(Gls)
2017–2018	Western Pride	29	(14)
2019	Brisbane Strikers	26	(41)
2020	Lion City Sailors	2	(1)
2020–2021	Peninsula Power	42	(44)
2022–	Lions FC	84	(63)
- * Club domestic league appearances and goals as of 19 July 2024

Andy Pengelly (born 19 July 1997) is an Australian professional footballer who plays as a striker for Lions FC in the National Premier Leagues

== Club career ==
=== Brisbane Strikers ===
In 2019, Pengelly won the National Premier Leagues Queensland Golden Boot, scoring 41 goals in 26 NPL appearances for Brisbane Strikers, including a club record nine in a single match against Sunshine Coast Fire. He also scored 11 goals in eight FFA Cup appearances, including six in a Round 4 Preliminary clash against Souths United. He scored against A-League side Wellington Phoenix in the Round of 32, helping his side to a penalty shootout win, and against Melbourne City in a 5–1 semi final loss, lifting his season tally to 52 goals in just 34 appearances.

As a result of his scoring record, Pengelly trialled with the Central Coast Mariners in August 2019. That trial did not result in a contract.

=== Lion City Sailors ===
Pengelly signed his first professional contract with Singapore Premier League club Home United in December 2019. Prior to the start of the 2020 season, the club was taken over and its name changed to Lion City Sailors. Pengelly scored on his competitive debut for the Sailors in their 1–1 away draw with Tanjong Pagar United on Friday, 6 March 2020, in what was the club's' first ever goal as the Sailors. Premier Sports Agency moved Pengelly to Lions City Sailors FC.

On 15 July 2020, it was announced Pengelly had parted ways with the club to remain in Australia, where he had returned during the global COVID-19 pandemic, to sign for NPL side Peninsula Power.

=== Peninsula Power ===
Pengelly signed for Peninsula Power from the Brisbane Strikers, but left for Singapore to play for Lion City Sailors before he kicked a ball for the Redcliffe peninsula-based club.

His first game for the Power came after he returned to Queensland during the COVID-19 pandemic, joining the side late in the 2020 season. He scored 14 goals in 15 league games that year.

In his first full season, in 2021, Pengelly scored 30 goals in 27 league appearances for the Power, taking out the NPL Queensland Golden Boot and the competition's Player of the Year award.

=== Lions FC ===
On 23 December 2021, Lions FC announced Pengelly as their number 9 for the 2022 NPL Queensland season.

== Career statistics ==
=== Club ===
As of 31 July 2024

Appearances and goals by club, season and competition
Club	Season	League			Cup		Total	
Club	Season	Division	Apps	Goals	Apps	Goals	Apps	Goals
Western Pride FC	2017	NPL Queensland (A2)	1	0	0	0	1	0
Western Pride FC	2018	NPL Queensland (A2)	27	14	2	2	29	16
Western Pride FC	Club total		28	14	2	2	30	16
Brisbane Strikers FC	2019	NPL Queensland (A2)	26	41	8	11	34	52
Brisbane Strikers FC	Club total		26	41	8	11	34	52
Lion City Sailors	2020	Singapore Premier League	2	1	0	0	2	1
Lion City Sailors	Club total		2	1	0	0	2	1
Peninsula Power	2020	NPL Queensland (A2)	15	14	0	0	15	14
Peninsula Power	2021	NPL Queensland (A2)	27	30	4	3	31	33
Peninsula Power	Club total		42	44	4	3	46	47
Lions FC	2022	NPL Queensland (A2)	23	19	4	7	27	26
Lions FC	2023	NPL Queensland (A2)	23	17	7	8	30	25
Lions FC	2024	NPL Queensland (A2)	23	12	16	16	39	28
Lions FC	2025	NPL Queensland (A2)	24	16	10	9	34	25
Lions FC	Club total		93	64	37	40	130	104
Career total			191	164	51	56	242	220

== Honours ==
Brisbane Strikers

- NPL Queensland: Golden Boot (2019)

Peninsula Power

- NPL Queensland: Premiers (2020, 2021)
- NPL Queensland: Golden Boot (2021)
- NPL Queensland: Player of the Year (2021)

Lions FC

- NPL Queensland: Premiers (2022)
- NPL Queensland: Champions (2024)
- NPL Queensland: Champions (2025)
- NPL Queensland: Golden Boot (2025)
