= Logan United FC =

- Full name: Logan United Football Club
- Nickname(s): LUFC
- Founded: 2008
- Dissolved: 2010
- Ground: Clem Jones Field; Logan, Queensland, Australia
- Capacity: 5000
Home colours	Away colours

Logan United Football Club were a professional Australian soccer club based in Logan, Queensland which played in the Queensland State League. They did not apply to stay in the league for the 2010 Queensland State League season.

== History ==
Logan United was formed in 2008 to join the Queensland State League, a new league formed to fill the gap between the A-League and various city competitions around the state. In their first season in the competition the team placed fifth (out of ten teams), then sixth (out of eleven) in the 2009 season. The club started with a strong squad, including some former A-League players, such as Switzerland-born Remo Buess who had played with FC Zurich in the Swiss Super League as well as Queensland Roar (now Brisbane Roar) in the A-League, Papua New Guinean international Reggie Davani, Fijian national team player Raj Oshen and Vanuatu national football team Goalkeeper Chikau Mansale. Former English Premier League Goalkeeper Jason Kearton works as the club's Goalkeeping coach.

== Colours and badge ==
The club's home kit was black and white strip jerseys, with white pants and white socks. The club's away jersey is yellow, with black pants and yellow socks. Crestmead based company 'BWS' wereLogan United's major sponsor, with their logo on the club's strip on both the front and back of their squad jerseys.

== Previous squad ==
2009 Queensland State League Squad Note: Flags indicate national team as defined under FIFA eligibility rules; some limited exceptions apply. Players may hold more than one non-FIFA nationality.

No.	Pos.	Nation	Player
1	GK	(Australia) AUS	Sebastian Usai
2	MF	(Australia) AUS	Ryan Stenhouse
3	DF	(Australia) AUS	Mitch Nelis
4	DF	(Switzerland) SUI	Remo Buess
5	DF	(Australia) AUS	Jackson Dixon-Best
6	DF	(Fiji) FIJ	Raj Oshen
7	MF	(Australia) AUS	Damien Kallis
8	MF	(Australia) AUS	Filip Nechifor
9	FW	(Australia) AUS	Blake Kallis
10	DF	(Australia) AUS	Robert Laslo

No.	Pos.	Nation	Player
11	FW	(Croatia) CRO	Daniel Gecic
12	MF	(Australia) AUS	Luke Howell
13	FW	(Australia) AUS	Jon San Martin
14	MF	(Japan) JPN	Nobuhiro Iwami
15	MF	(Argentina) ARG	Jair Wilk
16	DF	(Australia) AUS	Jesse McDonnell
17	DF	(Australia) AUS	Josh Filewood
18	MF	(Australia) AUS	Chris Roulston
19	FW	(Papua New Guinea) PNG	Reggie Davani
20	GK	(Vanuatu) VAN	Chikau Mansale

== Representatives ==
The following players are currently or were formerly members of their respective national teams:

- (Croatia) Daniel Gecic
- (Papua New Guinea) Reggie Davani
- (Vanuatu) Chikau Mansale
- (Fiji) Raj Oshen

The following players are currently or were formerly members of their respective national youth teams:

- (Switzerland) Remo Buess
- (Croatia) Daniel Gecic
- (Australia) Blake Kallis
- (Australia) Damien Kallis
- (Australia) Sebastian Usai

== Club Partnerships ==
In 2009, Logan United signed several partnerships with local clubs in the area to strengthen their own team as well as provide opportunities to share coaching information as well as players with developmental clubs. These clubs included Greenbank Seniors FC, Logan Uniting Church SC and Eagle United FC

== Club achievements ==
All-Time Most Appearances

- (Australia) Sebastian Usai – 41 Games

All-Time Leading Goalscorer

- (Croatia) Daniel Gecic – 38 Goals

Most Yellow Cards In A Season

- (Australia) Josh Filewood – 7 Yellow Cards

Most Red Cards In A Season

- (Australia) Josh Filewood – 2 Red Cards

All-Time Most Assists

- (Croatia) Daniel Gecic – 22 Assists

First Player to score a goal

- (Australia) Robert Laslo Vs North Queensland Razorbacks, Round 1–30 March 2008

First player to score over 1 goal in a game

- (Australia) Blake Kallis – 2 goals vs Redlands City Devils, Round 4–19 April 2008

Youngest Player to Play For Logan United FC

- (Australia) Damien Kallis – 16 years 196 days Vs QAS – 2 August 2008

== See also ==
- Queensland State League
