= Miguel Medina (footballer) =

Paraguayan footballer (born 1993)

Personal information
- Full name: Miguel Ramon Medina
- Date of birth: 1 June 1993 (age 33)
- Place of birth: San Lorenzo, Paraguay
- Height: 1.84 m (6 ft 0 in)
- Position: Forward

Youth career
- 2007–2009: Rubio Ñu
- 2011–2013: Udinese

Senior career*
Years	Team	Apps	(Gls)
2010	Sport Colombia	30	(8)
2011	Independiente	2	(0)
2011–2014	Udinese	0	(0)
2013	→ Napoli (loan)	0	(0)
2013–2014	→ Perugia (loan)	0	(0)
2011–2014	General Díaz	3	(0)
- * Club domestic league appearances and goals

Miguel Ramon Medina (born 1 June 1993) is a Paraguayan professional footballer. His main position is forward but he can also play at left and right wing.

== Career ==
Medina began his career at Club Rubio Ñu. In May 2010 it was reported, that he had gone to Italy to negotiate with Udinese. He passed the medical test's but because he was only 16 years old at the time, he had to wait until he was 18. He joined Udinese on in September 2011. In his first season, Medina played three games for the Primavera squad and 18 games in the following season, scoring 8 goals.

In January 2013, he was loaned out to Napoli. In the 2013–14 season, Medina was loaned out to Perugia. Medina left Italy and joined General Díaz for the 2015 season.
