= Capricorn Cougars FC =

Australian football club

Capricorn Cougars
- Full name: Capricorn Cougars Football
- Nickname(s): Cougars
- Founded: 2008
- Ground: Ryan Park, Rockhampton
- Head Coach: Joe Fenech
- League: Queensland State League
Home colours

Capricorn Cougars were an Australian football club from Rockhampton, Queensland, who played in the Queensland State League.

== History ==
The Capricorn Cougars were one of ten foundation teams in the QSL formed in 2008.

In 2008 the Capricorn Cougars coach was Justin Kilshaw. He resigned after round 4 after conflict occurred between the coaches objectives and outcomes for the team, in comparison to the Boards requirements on player selections for the team.

The current coach is Bradley Smith, who is a locally grown coach with great knowledge of the region. He had previously been Assistant Coach to Kilshaw in 2008 and was quickly appointed Head Coach after Kilshaw's resignation.

In 2008 Cougars player Michael Cay was selected in Soccer International's top 50 players in Australia outside the A-League.

Another player who has been successful at the Cougars is Tristan Fraser who was hand picked by Ian Ferguson, the coach of the new A-League team North Queensland Fury to attend a training session in Townsville prior to the 2009–2010 season.
