= Brisbane Strikers FC =

Soccer club in Australia

Brisbane Strikers
- Full name: Brisbane Strikers Football Club
- Nickname: The Strikers
- Founded: 1991 (as Brisbane United)
- Ground: Perry Park
- Capacity: 5,000
- Chairman: Paolo Ucchino
- Coach: Kevin Aherne-Evans
- League: FQPL
- 2026: 1st of 12 (Premiers) & (Promoted) NPL Queensland
- Website: www.brisbanestrikers.com.au
Home colours	Away colours

Brisbane Strikers Football Club is an Australian association football club based in Brisbane, Queensland. Founded in 1991 as Brisbane United, the club competed in the National Soccer League until the 2003–04 season. Brisbane Strikers currently compete in the Football Queensland Premier League, with home matches played at Perry Park.

== History ==
=== Background ===
Brisbane's first representation in the National Soccer League (NSL), then known as the Philips Soccer League (PSL), came in the form of Brisbane City and Brisbane Lions. Brisbane City won the first two national knockout competitions, by defeating Marconi in 1977 and West Adelaide in 1978. Brisbane Lions won the knockout competition in 1981, also defeating West Adelaide. Brisbane City left the NSL in after the 1986 season and Brisbane Lions after the 1988 season.

=== National Soccer League 1991–2004 ===
Chart of yearly table positions for Brisbane Strikers in NSL

The next Brisbane team in the NSL was Brisbane United, which played from 1991 to 1993 coached by Miron Bleiberg. The team wore predominately white, with a blue and gold trim – the official colours of Brisbane. After a troubled time, with small crowds, confronting relegation and with a "disenchanted team", former Australian Soccer Federation chairman Ian Brusasco headed a trustee management group to restructure the club. The name was changed to the Brisbane Strikers for the 1993/94 season, with the colours, newly installed coach Bruce Stowell and most players retained. Initially the Brisbane Strikers were owned by the Queensland Soccer Federation (QSF), which handed the running of the club to a Trust Management Group composed of Brusasco (also a former president of the QSF), Clem Jones (former Lord Mayor of Brisbane) and leading football official Frank Speare. Coached by Stowell for three seasons, the Strikers finished fourth in 1995/96 to qualify for their first NSL finals appearance, in which they lost a semi-final playoff over two legs to Sydney United. In the 1996/97 season, the Strikers ditched the white to wear a predominately gold kit, with blue trims, and were led by player-coach Frank Farina. The team finished second on the NSL ladder to Sydney United before going on to beat United in their semi-final to set up a home grand final – against the same team. During this period, future FIFA whistleblower Bonita Mersiades worked for the Strikers as the club's media officer. At a time when football was struggling for mainstream acceptance and credibility in Australia, NSL Grand Final – the pinnacle of club football in Australia – generally drew crowds between 12,000 and 25,000. The 1997 Grand Final, played at Lang Park in Brisbane, drew a capacity 40,446 spectators to watch the Strikers beat Sydney United 58 by 2–0 with goals by Farina and Rod Brown.

This was a watershed moment for football in Australia, but the Strikers struggled the next season, finishing 12th. A significant event in the history of the club occurred in 1998 when the QSF divested itself of its ownership, which passed to the Strikers Football Club Pty Ltd. Scarcely three years after the club had played its part in Australian club football's proudest moment, it was dealt a savage blow when Soccer Australia, as part of a restructuring of the national competition, refused the Strikers' application for a place in the NSL, citing financial concerns. Canberra Cosmos was also expelled. This left the national league without a representative from the country's third most populous state. Politicians, supporters and the general public waged a campaign to have the club reinstated to the national league. Then-Queensland premier Peter Beattie said of Soccer Australia officials: "Who the hell do they think they are?" How can you have a national soccer competition without a Queensland team? I mean, it's absolutely ridiculous. Soccer officials must be sensitive to its national obligations."

Public pressure eventually convinced Soccer Australia to reverse its decision and grant the Strikers Football Club Pty Ltd a licence for the 2000/2001 season. Back on the field, under coach John Kosmina, the Strikers finished fourth and qualified for the NSL finals. Eventual premiers South Melbourne FC prevailed over the Strikers in their two-legged semi-final. The next season saw the Strikers struggle again and led to the club parting ways with Kosmina. Despite a host of coaches showing interest in the vacancy, including some from overseas, the Strikers took the step of appointing 28-year-old club captain Stuart McLaren as head coach, assisted by Luciano Trani. Together, the two assembled a squad of unsung players from the local leagues and turning them into a team that took the club back to the 2003/04 NSL finals only to lose a memorable semi-final play-off to Adelaide United. That season was the last for the NSL. A strong reform movement within the game in Australia had seen a new Soccer Australia Board appointed (which would change its name to Football Federation Australia) under the Chairmanship of Frank Lowy and the new governing body set about creating a new national competition called the A-League. 1996/97 remained the only time a Queensland team had won an Australian national football title, until Brisbane Roar won the 2010–11 A-League title.

=== First A-League bid ===
The Brisbane Strikers were a prime candidate for the Brisbane position in the new A-League that kicked off in mid-2005. Football Federation Australia boss Frank Lowy was quoted at the time saying that the two Brisbane bids were outstanding, but the reality was that only one team would make it. The A-League decided to go with the Lions bid, who changed their name to the Queensland Roar, whose name changed once more to the present Brisbane Roar, maintaining their local link to the Lions, and its Dutch ethnic iconography.

=== Brisbane Premier League 2005–2007 ===
Determined to find an outlet to continue their philosophy of developing the talents of Queensland footballers, the Brisbane Strikers joined forces with local Brisbane club North Star to field a team in the Brisbane Premier League. Coached by Bobby Hamilton, the new team qualified for the finals play-off in its first BPL season (2005) before falling to Palm Beach in a semi-final. However, in 2006 the Strikers carried all before them, winning the BPL championship, the Grand Final and the Premier Cup. Another coaching change saw Craig Collins take on the player-coach role in 2007. It was an "almost" season for the Strikers, which saw them finish runners-up in the championship to Rochedale Rovers F.C., before losing a titanic struggle in the Grand Final to the same team by the scoreline of 5–4.

=== Queensland State League 2008–2012 ===
With the Queensland State League due to commence in 2008 as part of Football Federation Australia and Football Queensland's goal of enhancing career pathways across Queensland and providing a platform between the local and national competitions, the Strikers saw a position in the QSL as a natural "fit" with the club's own player development ethos. Its application to join the new state competition was accepted and the club, once again under the coaching of Stuart McLaren, put its best foot forward on playing fields from Brisbane to Townsville in the inaugural QSL season. The Strikers finished second behind Sunshine Coast F.C. on the league table before hosting the Grand Final at Perry Park and losing to the same team.

The following season, McLaren and his squad clinched the QSL championship in the penultimate round of the competition after a tense season-long battle with Olympic FC. In doing so, the Brisbane Strikers became one of the very few football clubs in Australia to have won trophies at local, state and national levels. However, the Strikers lost in a Grand Final once again, going down 1–4 in a boilover result to Redlands United FC, who had finished the season in fourth position on the QSL ladder. The 2010 and 2011 campaigns took on a familiar path. With David Large taking on the coaching role from the departing McLaren, the club finished both seasons in second position on the league table before going on to host the Grand Finals and losing each one by an identical scoreline, 1–0 to Sunshine Coast FC. The 2012 QSL proved to be a successful season for the club. The Strikers claimed their second QSL championship in five years in emphatic fashion, finishing eight points above second place Far North Queensland Bulls FC. The Strikers were eliminated in a home semi-final by 2–0 to Whitsunday Miners FC.

=== National Premier Leagues Queensland 2013–2021 ===
After 2012 the Strikers competed in the National Premier Leagues Queensland, run by Football Queensland, the top tier state-level association football competition in Queensland, replacing the Queensland State League. The conference is a sub division of the National Premier Leagues. The league consists of teams across Queensland.

In seasons 2013 and 2014 the Strikers finished fourth in the league before being eliminated in the semi-finals by league winners and eventual Grand Final champions in Olympic FC and Palm Beach Sharks respectively. Season 2015 saw a new coach take the helm in Kevin Aherne-Evans and while enjoying a relatively successful campaign it was to prove a frustrating year for the club. With the Strikers equal top of the league but second on goal difference their final game of the season was abandoned due to wet weather and with the governing body, Football Queensland, choosing not to reschedule the match and deem it a goalless draw they were forced to settle for the runners-up position. The disappointment from the last game controversy was further heightened when the Strikers qualified for the Grand Final, only to lose to their league rivals Moreton Bay United.

The Strikers proved a dominant force in season 2016, finally clinching the club's first National Premier Leagues Queensland league title. In 2017 Sean Lane took over the coaching duties from the departing Aherne-Evans. The Strikers became the first side to win consecutive league titles in the National Premier Leagues Queensland era after a gripping battle with Gold Coast City FC. Postseason football however continued to be a thorn in the Strikers' side with the team losing their semi-finals in both 2016 and 2017 seasons. As league winners in 2016 and 2017 the Strikers also qualified for the Australia-wide National Premier Leagues finals series which sees the winner from each state federation compete in a knockout cup competition to be crowned national champions. After losing at the semi-final stage to eventual champions Sydney United 58 in 2016, the Strikers became the first Queensland side to make the Grand Final in 2017 where they hosted National Premier Leagues Victoria side Heidelberg United. The Strikers lost that match 2–0 in front of 1105 fans at Perry Park.

The following year, an annual $500,000 bequeathment from the late Dr Jones, which was paid to Strikers, Sport, Recreation and Welfare Association Limited for a decade after his death, ended as per the terms of his will. The club's 2020 financial report, submitted to the Australian Securities and Investments Commission, noted: "The discontinuation of the above funding subsequent to 30 June 2018 gives rise to a material uncertainty which may cast significant doubt about the ability of the entity to continue as a going concern."

In 2019, the Strikers appointed Salvatore Sottile and Julianna Suranyi, who claimed to be a psychic, to the board. Shortly afterwards, in February 2020, a player development partnership with Spanish club CD Leganes was announced, with the relationship between Sottile and CD Leganes representative Morris Pagniello cited as the driving force behind the deal. Pagniello was one of about 50 people arrested as part of the 2015 "Dirty Soccer" Italian football match-fixing scandal. For the 2021 season, and without the financial stability of Dr Jones's bequeathment, Strikers chairman Bruce Atterton-Evans announced a new youth-focused policy that saw almost the entire first-team squad depart for rival clubs. The effect was instant, with the Strikers winning just two matches in the 2021 NPL season, ensuring relegation for the first time in the club's history.

Atterton-Evans ceased being a director on 14 October 2021, leaving the Strikers under the control of Sottile, Suranyi and Bosnian-born Brisbane businessman Dino Hasanovic.

Paolo Ucchino replaced Suranyi as chairman on 10 July, 2024.

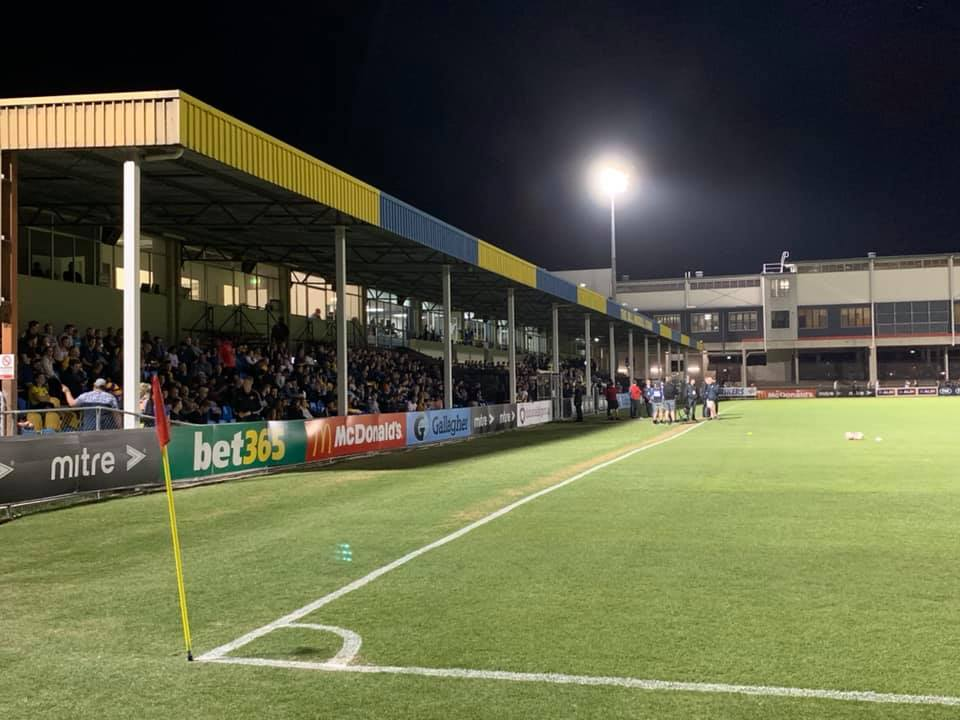
Perry Park before kick-off for the 2019 FFA Cup semi-final against Melbourne City. The attendance was 3706.

=== FFA Cup ===
Since its inception in 2014, Brisbane Strikers has enjoyed some memorable moments in the FFA Cup. Qualifying through the Brisbane zone for the national Round of 32 in 2014 the Strikers featured in a piece of Australian football history when its tie against Newcastle based club Broadmeadow Magic became the first live televised game of the new cup competition. The Strikers won the game by 2–1 but were eliminated in the Round of 16 after a 1–0 away loss to Adelaide City FC. Once again the Strikers made it to the national stage of the FFA Cup in 2015 when the qualified for the Round of 32 from the Brisbane zone. However they suffered a heartbreaking 4–3 extra time defeat to Hume City FC.

The 2016 FFA Cup saw Brisbane Strikers qualify for the third successive time, this time drawing Darwin NorZone Premier League side Shamrock Rovers Darwin FC in the Round of 32. On 27 July 2016, the Strikers ran out 6–0 winners over Rovers Darwin in front of 1358 people at Darwin Football Stadium. In the Round of 16, Brisbane drew A-League side Melbourne City FC. In front of 3571 people at Perry Park, the Strikers' biggest crowd since their exit from the NSL, two Bruno Fornaroli penalties saw the A-League side progress, despite the Strikers taking the lead through Greig Henslee. The match also marked Tim Cahill's first game since arriving back in Australia, joining Melbourne City.

The Strikers next qualified for the Round of 32 in the 2019 FFA Cup, where they met Wellington Phoenix at Perry Park on 7 August. In front of 1612 fans, the Strikers went 2–0 ahead through goals to Hiroki Omori and Andy Pengelly, before Wellington scored twice to equalise. The Strikers held on in extra time, thanks largely to goalkeeper Bon Scott, who saved an extra time penalty. Scott continued his heroics in the penalty shoot-out, which the Strikers won 4–3.

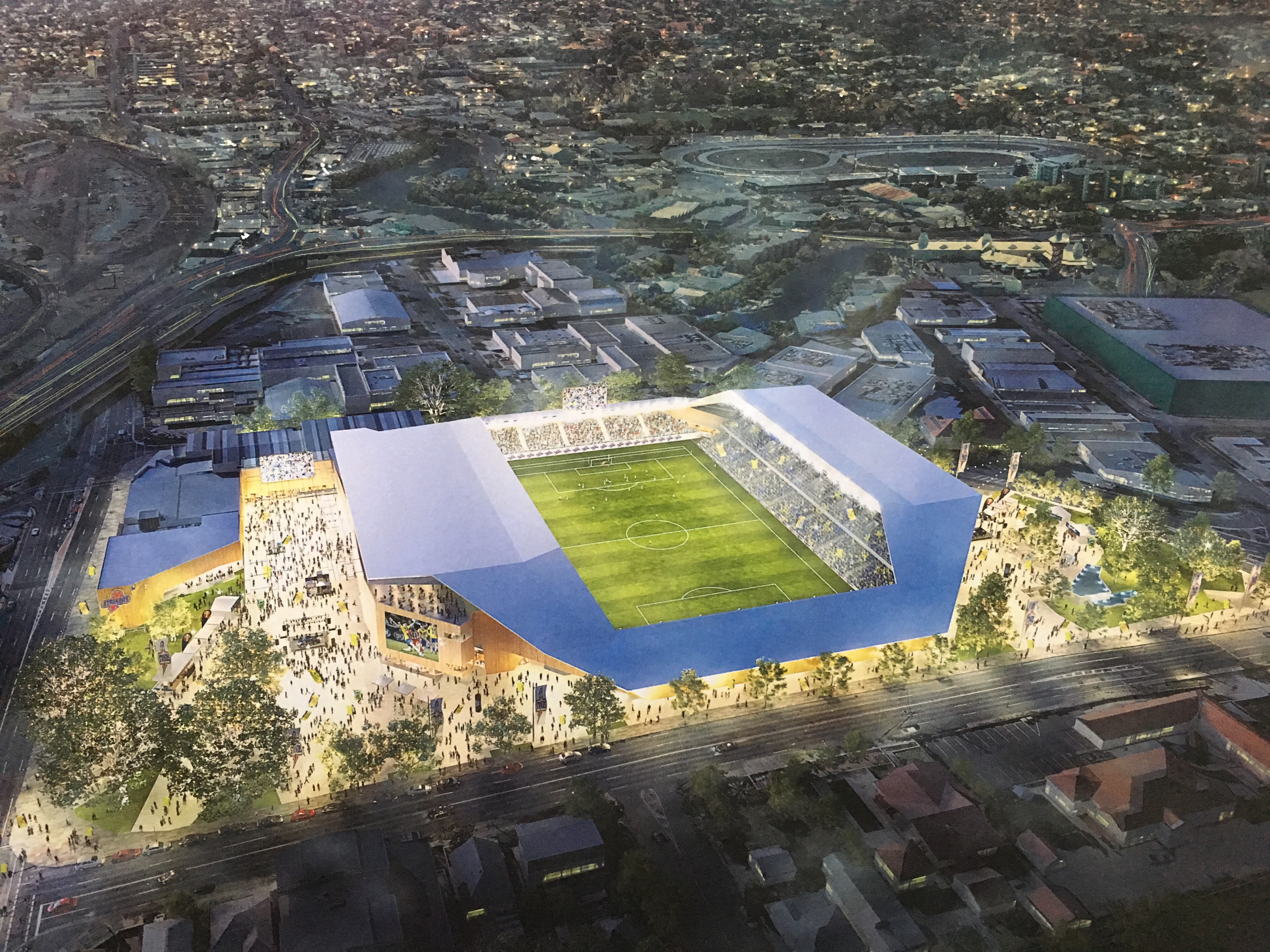
The Strikers commissioned Cox Architects to design a 15,694-seat boutique stadium for Perry Park as part of the club's bid to join the A-League.

The Strikers qualified for the quarter-finals for the very first time on 29 August 2019, when they defeated Manly United 1–0 in front of 1240 spectators at Perry Park and drawing Moreland Zebras in the next round.

The Strikers defeated the Zebras by 3–2 in front of 1915 at Perry Park on 18 September 2019, to become the first Queensland side to qualify for the FFA Cup semi finals, setting up a match with Melbourne City. They lost that match at Perry Park 1–5, in front of a post-NSL club record crowd of 3706.

=== Second A-League bid ===
The Strikers announced in May 2017 that the club would once again put in a bid to join the A-League, with the club making the announcement on the 20th anniversary of its NSL grand final win. Central to the Strikers bid was the club's plan for a 15,694-seat boutique stadium at Perry Park.

However, the club pulled out of the race when the bid's financial backers pulled their support. The debacle led to criticism from fans about the club's direction and the "inertia" of the bid.

Later, it emerged that the Strikers had approached Brisbane City, another Brisbane club vying for A-League admission, about consolidating their bids. Brisbane City knocked back that approach. City subsequently withdrew its own bid.

== Players (2025) ==
Note: Flags indicate national team as defined under FIFA eligibility rules; some limited exceptions apply. Players may hold more than one non-FIFA nationality.

No.	Pos.	Nation	Player
1	GK	AUS	Ryan Mudaliar
2	DF	AUS	Addison Brader
3	FW	AUS	Marcellus Smith
4	MF	AUS	Dyce Robertson
5		AUS	Daniel Lu
6	MF	AUS	Wil Edmiston
7	FW	NZL	Daniel Champness
8	MF	NZL	Oliver Duncan
9	FW	AUS	Ali Russell
10	MF	ITA	Tommaso Rio
11	MF	AUS	Seth Renjifo
12	MF	AUS	Apollo Kabamba
13	DF	KOR	Soon-yong Hwang
14	DF	NED	Joaquin Okech
15	DF	AUS	Omoro Adoro
16	MF	JPN	Kirito Higuchi
17	DF	AUS	Lachlan Harrison
18	FW	AUS	Matthew Thurtell (Captain)
19	FW	AUS	Alex Grana
20	GK	AUS	Sean O’Connor

No.	Pos.	Nation	Player
21	MF	AUS	Ethan Poore
22	FW	AUS	Marcellus Smith
23	FW	COL	Jheison Macuace
24	MF	AUS	Nadir Naouri
25	DF	AUS	Austin Taylor
26	MF	AUS	Oliver Hodgkins
27	DF	AUS	Sam Pickett
28			
29		AUS	Connor White
30		AUS	Ryder Sewell
31		AUS	Naveed Sedaqat
32			
33			
34		AUS	Ben Li
35		AUS	Griffin Ridler
36	DF	AUS	Zayde Smith
37	MF	AUS	Rylan Sandford-Bell
38		AUS	Marley Liau
39			
40	GK	AUS	Luke Vitagliano

== Coaching staff ==
Position	Name
Head coach	Kevin Aherne-Evans
Assistant coach	Daniel Carew, Raymond Moore
Physio	Jennifer Benedetto
Goalkeeping coach	Steve O'Connor
Technical advisor	Frank Farina
U23 head coach	Raymond Moore
U23 assistant coach	Hudson Rogers

== Notable players ==
Players who have represented their country at senior level. Active players in bold.

As of 24 September 2026

Player	Pos	National team	Debut	Caps	G	World Cup	Confed Cup	Continental championships
**Rahmat Akbari**	MF	Afghanistan	2023	15	1	0	0	0
Clint Bolton	GK	Australia	2000	4	0	0	1 (2001)	1 (OFC 2000)
Rod Brown	FW	Australia	1985	2	0	0	0	0
Nathan Coe	GK	Australia	2011	3	0	0	0	1 (AFC 2011)
Sean Cranney	MF	Australia	1996	3	0	0	0	1 (OFC 1996)
**Zion Cruz**	MF	Timor-Leste	2025	10	1	0	0	0
**Denis Daluri**	FW	South Sudan	2019	4	0	0	0	0
Alex Davani	MF	Papua New Guinea	2003	4	3	0	0	0
Alun Evans	DF	New Zealand	1992	17	0	0	0	0
Frank Farina	FW	Australia	1984	37	11	0	0	0
**Lee-Navu Faunt**	MF	Papua New Guinea	2023	5	0	0	0	1 (OFC 2024)
Glenn Gwynne	DF	Australia	1998	2	0	0	0	1 (OFC 1998)
Danny Halligan	MF	New Zealand	1987	36	5	0	0	0
Alan Hunter	DF	Australia	1986	9	1	0	0	0
Carl Jorgensen	DF	New Zealand	1991	1	0	0	0	0
Stephen Laybutt	DF	Australia	2000	15	1	0	0	2 (OFC 2000, 2004)
**Dauntae Mariner**	MF	Samoa	2023	13	0	0	0	1 (OFC 2024)
Brad McDonald	MF	Papua New Guinea	2014	1	0	0	0	0
Jon McKain	DF	Australia	2004	16	0	0	0	1 (AFC 2011)
Matt McKay	MF	Australia	2006	59	2	1 (2014)	0	2 (AFC 2011, 2015)
Craig Moore*	DF	Australia	1995	52	3	2 (2006, 2010)	2 (2001, 2005)	0
Jade North	DF	Australia	2002	41	0	0	0	2 (OFC 2002, 2004)
Jason Polak	MF	Australia	1988	32	2	0	0	1 (OFC 1996)
Adam Sarota	MF	Australia	2011	3	0	0	0	0
Shane Smeltz	FW	New Zealand	2003	58	24	1 (2010)	3 (2003, 2009, 2017)	3 (OFC 2004, 2008, 2012)
Matt Smith	DF	Australia	2012	3	0	0	0	0
Jean Carlos Solórzano	FW	Costa Rica	2012	1	0	0	0	0
Shane Stefanutto	DF	Australia	2007	3	0	0	0	0
Felix Tagawa	MF	Tahiti	2000	22	14	0	0	3 (OFC 2000, 2002, 2004)
Kris Trajanovski	FW	Australia	1996	16	11	0	0	2 (OFC 1996, 1998)
Kasey Wehrman	MF	Australia	1998	12	0	0	0	1 (OFC 1998)
Chris Zoricich	DF	New Zealand	1988	57	1	0	2 (1999, 2003)	3 (OFC 1998, 2000, 2002)
Michael Zullo	DF	Australia	2009	10	0	0	0	0

* Craig Moore never played a match for the Strikers, but was a registered player when he trained with the club ahead of the 2010 FIFA World Cup.

== List of head coaches ==
Coach	Years
(Israel) Miron Bleiberg	1991–1994
(England) Bruce Stowell	1994–1996
(Australia) Frank Farina	1996–1998
(Australia) John Kosmina	1998–2003
(Australia) John Kosmina	2020–2021
(Australia) Stuart McLaren	2003–2004
(Australia) Stuart McLaren	2008–2010
(Scotland) Bobby Hamilton	2005–2006
(Australia) Craig Collins	2007
(England) David Large	2010–2013
(England) David Large	2018
(Australia) Chay Hews	2014
(Wales) Kevin A'Herne-Evans	2015–2016
(Wales) Kevin A'Herne-Evans	2024–present
(England) Sean Lane	2017
(England) Owen Baker	2019–2020
(Bosnia and Herzegovina) Vedran Becirbegovic	2021–2022
(Australia) Bojan Vilic	2022
(Germany) André Meyer	2022–2023
(Australia) Jade North	2023
(Australia) Daniel Carew	2024

== Honours ==
National Soccer League

- Champions: 1996–97
- League Runners-Up: 1996–97

FFA Cup

- Michael Cockerill Medal: Fraser Hills (2019)

NPL Queensland

- Premiers (2): 2016, 2017
- League Runners-Up: 2015
- Grand Finalists: 2015
- Golden boot: 2019 (Andy Pengelly – 41 goals)

Football Queensland Premier League 1

- Premiers: 2026
- Champions: 2026
- Golden boot: 2026 (Matt Thurtell – 15 goals)

Queensland State League

- Premiers (2): 2009, 2012
- League Runners-Up (3): 2008, 2010, 2011
- Grand Finalists (4): 2008, 2009, 2010, 2011
- Golden Boot: 2010 (Matt Thurtell – 23 goals)

Brisbane Premier League

- Premiers: 2006
- League Runners-Up: 2007
- Champions: 2006
- Grand Finalist: 2007

Canale Cup

- Champions: 2014

Brisbane Premier Cup

- Champions: 2006

Silver Boot

- Champions (3): 2010, 2013, 2018
- Runners-Up (2): 2009, 2016
- Third-place play-off winner: 2019

== Records ==
=== League ===
- Win: 12–1 v Sunshine Coast FC (NPL Queensland round 18, Perry Park, 20 August 2019)
- Loss: 10–0 v Olympic FC (NPL Queensland round 8, Goodwin Park, 9 May 2021)
- Goals in a single game: 9 – Andy Pengelly (v Sunshine Coast FC, NPL Queensland round 18, Perry Park, 20 August 2019)
- Appearances: Chay Hews (217)
- Attendance: 40,446 v Sydney United (1996–97 NSL Grand Final, Suncorp Stadium, 25 May 1997)

=== FFA Cup ===
- Loss: 1–5 v Melbourne City (Semi-final, Perry Park, 1 October 2019)
- Attendance: 3,706 v Melbourne City (semi-final, Perry Park, 1 October 2019)

Preceded by Melbourne Knights	NSL Champions; 1996/97	Succeeded by South Melbourne
