= Queensland State League (soccer) =

Queensland State League (QSL)
- Founded: 2008
- Folded: 2012
- Country: Australia
- Confederation: AFC (Asia)
- Number of clubs: 13 (total)
- Level on pyramid: 2
- Last champions: Sunshine Coast (4th title)
- Most championships: Sunshine Coast (4 titles)
- Website: qldsl.com.au

The Queensland State League, often abbreviated to the QSL, was a men's semi-professional soccer league in the Australian state of Queensland. The league was created by the state's governing body, Football Queensland, in 2008, to fill the gap between the national league (A-League) and the various city and regional leagues in the State. It was replaced in 2013 by the National Premier League Queensland as part of a wider introduction of the National Premier Leagues across the Australian soccer league system.

The QSL was conducted across Queensland during the winter season and administered by Football Queensland. The league replaced the State Cup, which was held from 2004 to 2007 as an end-of-season tournament for teams representing the various regional zones. The QSL was intended as the showcase for the state's elite talent, to provide a pathway from club soccer to the national ranks and a means of bringing soccer more into the media spotlight. Sponsored by the Hyundai Motor Company the league was officially known as the Hyundai Queensland State League.

== Clubs ==
Although the league involved no promotion or relegation to other leagues, its membership changed over the length of the league due to various reasons. For season 2010, Olympic, Redlands City Devils and Logan United did not re-nominate to stay in the league (Olympic FC and Redlands City Devils elected to return to the Brisbane Premier League (BPL) competition and Logan United disbanded). Gold Coast Stars and Southern Cross United joined the league for the 2011 season, however Southern Cross United withdrew from the competition on 19 April 2011 after completing only six rounds of the 2011 season.

Team	Home Ground	City	Year Established	First Year in QSL	Last Year in QSL	Current Status
Brisbane Strikers	Perry Park	Brisbane	1991	2009	2012	Playing in Queensland Premier League
Bundaberg Spirit	Marten Oval	Bundaberg	2008	2009	2012	Dissolved in 2012
Capricorn Cougars	Jardine Park	Rockhampton	2008	2009	2012	Dissolved in 2012
Far North Queensland Bulls	Borzi Park	Mareeba	2009	2009	2012	Successor club Dissolved in 2018
Gold Coast Stars	Runaway Bay Sports Centre	Gold Coast	2010	2011	2012	Dissolved in 2012
Logan United	Clem Jones Field	Logan	2008	2009	2009	Dissolved in 2010
North Queensland Razorbacks	Brolga Park	Townsville	2008	2009	2012	Successor club Dissolved in 2018
Olympic FC	Goodwin Park	Brisbane	1967	2009	2009	Playing in NPL Queensland
Queensland Academy of Sport	Meakin Park	Brisbane	1991	2009	2012	Inactive since 2013 NPL Queensland season
Redlands City Devils	Cleveland Showgrounds	Cleveland	1918	2009	2009	Playing in NPL Queensland
Southern Cross United	Perry Park	Brisbane	2011	2011	2011	Dissolved in 2011
Sunshine Coast	Stockland Park	Sunshine Coast	2007	2009	2012	Inactive since 2023 FQPL 1 season
Whitsunday Miners	Harrup Park	Mackay	2008	2009	2012	Dissolved in 2012

== Premiers ==
Year	Champions	Grand Final Winners
2012	Brisbane Strikers	Sunshine Coast FC
2011	Sunshine Coast FC	Sunshine Coast FC
2010	Sunshine Coast FC	Sunshine Coast FC
2009	Brisbane Strikers	Redlands City Devils
2008	Sunshine Coast FC	Sunshine Coast FC

== Seasons ==
=== 2012 ===
Pos	Team	Pld	W	D	L	GF	GA	GD	Pts
1	Brisbane Strikers	24	18	4	2	83	24	+59	58
2	FNQ Bulls	24	15	5	4	56	28	+28	50
3	Sunshine Coast FC	24	15	3	6	81	28	+53	48
4	Whitsunday Miners	24	13	6	5	55	43	+12	45
5	Queensland Academy of Sport	23	7	4	12	43	53	−10	25
6	Capricorn Cougars	24	6	5	13	42	58	−16	23
7	Bundaberg Spirit	23	5	6	12	32	52	−20	21
8	North Queensland Razorbacks	24	4	8	12	27	49	−22	20
9	Gold Coast Stars	24	2	3	19	18	102	−84	9

=== 2011 ===
Pos	Team	Pld	W	D	L	GF	GA	GD	Pts
1	Sunshine Coast FC	16	11	3	2	55	14	+41	36
2	Brisbane Strikers	16	10	1	5	45	21	+24	31
3	Whitsunday Miners	16	8	4	4	31	21	+10	28
4	FNQ Bulls	16	8	3	5	42	26	+16	27
5	Queensland Academy of Sport	16	7	5	4	35	26	+9	26
6	Gold Coast Stars	16	8	2	6	28	25	+3	26
7	North Queensland Razorbacks	16	5	5	6	36	31	+5	20
8	Bundaberg Spirit	16	1	1	14	12	65	−53	4
9	Capricorn Cougars	16	0	4	12	13	69	−56	4

=== 2010 ===
Pos	Team	Pld	W	D	L	GF	GA	GD	Pts
1	Sunshine Coast FC	21	18	1	2	63	26	+37	55
2	Brisbane Strikers	21	14	3	4	56	21	+35	45
3	Far North Queensland Bulls	21	11	2	8	47	42	+5	35
4	North Queensland Razorbacks	21	8	5	8	37	32	+5	29
5	Queensland Academy of Sport	21	7	4	10	46	54	−8	25
6	Capricorn Cougars	21	6	3	12	28	42	−14	21
7	Whitsunday Miners	21	4	6	11	29	49	−20	18
8	Bundaberg Spirit	21	2	4	15	25	65	−40	10

=== 2009 ===
Pos	Team	Pld	W	D	L	GF	GA	GD	Pts
1	Brisbane Strikers	20	16	2	2	69	19	+50	50
2	Olympic FC	20	15	1	4	54	22	+32	46
3	Sunshine Coast FC	20	13	2	5	55	28	+27	41
4	Redlands City Devils	20	11	1	8	54	33	+21	34
5	North Queensland Razorbacks	20	10	2	8	42	31	+11	32
6	Logan United	20	9	5	6	35	35	0	32
7	Far North Queensland Bulls	20	7	3	10	38	42	−4	24
8	Queensland Academy of Sport	20	7	3	10	35	46	−11	24
9	Capricorn Cougars	20	6	1	13	33	58	−25	19
10	Whitsunday Miners	20	4	3	13	30	50	−20	15
11	Bundaberg Spirit	20	0	1	19	14	95	−81	1

=== 2008 ===
Pos	Team	Pld	W	D	L	GF	GA	GD	Pts
1	Sunshine Coast FC	19	17	1	1	73	11	+62	49 (Note: 3 points deducted?)
2	Brisbane Strikers	18	12	3	3	37	18	+19	39
3	North Queensland Razorbacks	18	12	1	5	53	23	+30	37
4	Redlands City Devils	18	11	1	6	50	30	+20	34
5	Olympic FC	18	9	2	7	39	37	+2	29
6	Queensland Academy of Sport	18	6	3	9	33	40	−7	21
7	Capricorn Cougars	18	5	3	10	20	37	−17	18
8	Logan United	18	3	3	12	23	60	−37	12
9	Whitsunday Miners	18	3	2	13	29	64	−35	11
10	Bundaberg Spirit	18	3	1	14	13	50	−37	10
