= Padres FC =

- Full name: Mindil-Padres Football Club
- Nickname(s): Padres
- Chairman: Jesse Ledwidge
- League: defunct

Padres FC was an Australian soccer club from Darwin, Northern Territory, Australia.

== Colours ==
Padres FC's kit colours are yellow with black shoulder streaks and black shorts.

== See also ==
- Sport in the Northern Territory
