= Bundaberg Spirit FC =

- Full name: Bundaberg Spirit Football Club
- Nickname: Spirit
- Short name: Spirit
- Founded: 2008
- Dissolved: 2012
- Ground: Marten Oval; Bundaberg; Queensland; Australia
- Capacity: Unknown
- Owner: Unknown
- Chairman: Unknown
- Senior Men's Manager: Peter Martin and Tony Roebuck
- League: Queensland State League
- QSL 2010: 8th

The Bundaberg Spirit Football Club were an Australian soccer club located in Bundaberg, Queensland who competed in the Queensland State League. They participated in this competition since its inaugural season in 2008. Each season Bundaberg had finished in bottom place on the ladder and went through winless in the 2009 season. In 2012 the Bundaberg Spirit team was dissolved and removed from the Queensland State League due to poor finances and continued bad results. This served to strengthen the playing level and ability of the local soccer league in Bundaberg.

== Last squad ==
2012 Queensland State League Squad

Note: Flags indicate national team as defined under FIFA eligibility rules; some limited exceptions apply. Players may hold more than one non-FIFA nationality.

| No. | Pos. | Nation | Player |
|---|---|---|---|
| 1 | GK | AUS | Jason McEwan |
| 2 | DF | AUS | Mathew Mills |
| 4 | MF | AUS | Adam Ormsby |
| 5 | MF | AUS | Josh Metcalf |
| 6 | MF | ENG | Zac Freeburn |
| 7 | DF | AUS | Corey Haack |
| 9 | MF | AUS | Brendan Griffin |
| 10 | MF | AUS | Brett Kitching |
| 11 | MF | AUS | Luke Leggett |

| No. | Pos. | Nation | Player |
|---|---|---|---|
| 12 | FW | AUS | Shane Youngberry |
| 13 | MF | AUS | Jack Hambrecht |
| 14 | MF | AUS | Isaac Sanderson |
| 15 | DF | AUS | Jake Davis |
| 16 | FW | AUS | Brendan Davis |
| 17 | FW | AUS | Dylan Streets |
| 18 | MF | AUS | John Brillante |
| 19 | FW | AUS | Elliot Causer |
| 20 | GK | AUS | Mathew Eilers |
