= Darwin Dragons SC =

- Full name: Darwin Dragons Soccer Club
- Nickname(s): Dragons
- Chairman: Richard Iap
- League: defunct

Darwin Dragons SC was an Australian soccer club from Darwin, Northern Territory, Australia. Darwin Dragons played in the NT Northern Zone Premier League in 2007.

== See also ==
- Sport in the Northern Territory
