= 2022 Football Northern Territory season =

Football Northern Territory
- Season: 2022

The 2022 Football Northern Territory season in Northern Territory. The men's competitions consisted of three major divisions across the State.

== League table ==
=== 2022 NorZone Premier League ===
The season began on 8 April, concluding with the Grand Final on 1 October.

Pos	Team	Pld	W	D	L	GF	GA	GD	Pts	Qualification
1	Mindil Aces	18	14	1	3	49	27	+22	43	Qualification to Final Series
2	Hellenic Athletic (C)	18	12	2	4	46	21	+25	38	Qualification to Final Series
3	Casuarina FC	18	11	4	3	58	24	+34	37	Qualification to Final Series
4	Darwin Hearts	18	5	6	7	34	37	−3	21	Qualification to Final Series
5	Darwin Olympic	18	5	3	10	38	47	−9	18	
6	Uni Azzurri	18	4	1	13	26	58	−32	13	
7	Port Darwin	18	2	3	13	18	55	−37	9	

Source: mygameday
Rules for classification: 1) Points won; 2) Total goal difference; 3) Total goals scored;
(C) Champions

=== Finals series ===
Semi-finals
1	Mindil Aces	2
4	Darwin Hearts	1
2	Hellenic Athletic	4
3	Casuarina FC	3

Grand Final
Mindil Aces	0
Hellenic Athletic	1

=== 2022 NorZone Division One ===
The season began on 8 April, concluding with the Grand Final on 1 October.

Pos	Team	Pld	W	D	L	GF	GA	GD	Pts	Qualification
1	Hellenic Athletic (C)	21	18	0	3	97	32	+65	54	Qualification to Final Series
2	Uni Azzurri	21	13	4	4	56	31	+25	43	Qualification to Final Series
3	Port Darwin	21	12	2	7	75	46	+29	38	Qualification to Final Series
4	Palmerston Rovers	21	10	4	7	54	46	+8	34	Qualification to Final Series
5	Mindil Aces	21	9	1	11	48	51	−3	28	
6	Hellenic United	21	5	5	11	35	58	−23	20	
7	Darwin Olympic	21	5	1	15	33	73	−40	16	
8	Litchfield	21	3	1	17	28	89	−61	10	

Source: mygameday
Rules for classification: 1) Points won; 2) Total goal difference; 3) Total goals scored;
(C) Champions

=== Finals series ===
Semi-finals
2	Uni Azzurri	2
3	Port Darwin	0
1	Hellenic Athletic	5
4	Palmerston Rovers	1

Grand Final
Hellenic Athletic	1
Uni Azzurri	0

=== 2022 Southern Zone Premier League ===
The season began on 2 April, concluding with the Grand Final on 17 September.

Pos	Team	Pld	W	D	L	GF	GA	GD	Pts
1	MPH Vikings FC	18	11	4	3	64	38	+26	37
2	Verdi FC	18	9	6	3	49	30	+19	33
3	Alice Springs Celtic (C)	18	4	6	8	34	43	−9	18
4	Stormbirds SC	18	3	2	13	28	64	−36	11

Source: mygameday
Rules for classification: 1) Points won; 2) Total goal difference; 3) Total goals scored;
(C) Champions

=== Finals series ===
Semi-finals
1	MPH Vikings FC	1
2	Verdi FC	3
3	Alice Springs Celtic	6
4	Stormbirds SC	1

Preliminary Final
MPH Vikings FC	1
Alice Springs Celtic	2

Grand Final
Verdi FC	4
Alice Springs Celtic	5
