= 2017 National Premier Leagues =

National Premier Leagues
- Season: 2017
- Champions: Heidelberg United (1st Title)
- Finalists: Adelaide City; APIA Leichhardt Tigers; Bayswater City; Brisbane Strikers; Canberra Olympic; Edgeworth Eagles; Heidelberg United; South Hobart

The 2017 National Premier Leagues was the fifth season of the Australian National Premier Leagues soccer competition. The league competition was played amongst eight separate divisions, divided by FFA state and territory member federations. The divisions are ACT, NSW, Northern NSW, Queensland, South Australia, Tasmania, Victoria and Western Australia.

The winners of each respective divisional league competed in a finals playoff tournament at season end, with Heidelberg United crowned as Champions, which gave them direct qualification for the 2018 FFA Cup Round of 32.

== League tables ==
=== ACT ===
| Pos | Team | Pld | W | D | L | GF | GA | GD | Pts | Qualification or relegation |
|---|---|---|---|---|---|---|---|---|---|---|
| 1 | Canberra Olympic | 18 | 15 | 2 | 1 | 66 | 22 | +44 | 47 | 2017 National Premier Leagues Finals |
| 2 | FFA Centre of Excellence | 18 | 11 | 3 | 4 | 53 | 17 | +36 | 36 | |
| 3 | Belconnen United (C) | 18 | 11 | 1 | 6 | 55 | 24 | +31 | 34 | 2017 ACT Finals |
| 4 | Gungahlin United | 18 | 10 | 2 | 6 | 32 | 32 | 0 | 32 | 2017 ACT Finals |
| 5 | Canberra | 18 | 9 | 4 | 5 | 45 | 21 | +24 | 31 | 2017 ACT Finals |
| 6 | Tigers FC | 18 | 9 | 0 | 9 | 40 | 37 | +3 | 27 | |
| 7 | Tuggeranong United | 18 | 8 | 2 | 8 | 30 | 34 | −4 | 26 | |
| 8 | Woden Weston | 18 | 4 | 2 | 12 | 31 | 52 | −21 | 14 | |
| 9 | Riverina Rhinos | 18 | 1 | 4 | 13 | 15 | 71 | −56 | 7 | |
| 10 | Monaro Panthers | 18 | 1 | 2 | 15 | 11 | 62 | −51 | 5 | |

Source: sportstg
Rules for classification: 1) points; 2) goal difference; 3) number of goals scored.
(C) Champions

==== Finals ====
Semi-finals
1 | Canberra Olympic | 2 (2)
2 | Belconnen United (pen.) | 2 (4)
3 | Gungahlin United | 3
4 | Canberra FC | 0

Preliminary Final
1 | Canberra Olympic | 2
3 | Gungahlin United | 0

Grand Final
2 | Belconnen United | 2
1 | Canberra Olympic | 1

=== NSW ===
| Pos | Team | Pld | W | D | L | GF | GA | GD | Pts | Qualification or relegation |
|---|---|---|---|---|---|---|---|---|---|---|
| 1 | APIA Leichhardt Tigers | 22 | 16 | 1 | 5 | 50 | 18 | +32 | 49 | 2017 National Premier Leagues Finals |
| 2 | Blacktown City | 22 | 14 | 5 | 3 | 45 | 22 | +23 | 47 | 2017 NSW Finals |
| 3 | Rockdale City Suns | 22 | 12 | 6 | 4 | 42 | 28 | +14 | 42 | 2017 NSW Finals |
| 4 | Manly United (C) | 22 | 13 | 3 | 6 | 47 | 36 | +11 | 42 | 2017 NSW Finals |
| 5 | Sydney Olympic | 22 | 12 | 4 | 6 | 35 | 23 | +12 | 40 | 2017 NSW Finals |
| 6 | Wollongong Wolves | 22 | 12 | 1 | 9 | 35 | 28 | +7 | 37 | |
| 7 | Sydney United 58 | 22 | 10 | 4 | 8 | 42 | 27 | +15 | 34 | |
| 8 | Hakoah Sydney City East | 22 | 6 | 6 | 10 | 28 | 35 | −7 | 24 | |
| 9 | Bonnyrigg White Eagles | 22 | 5 | 4 | 13 | 31 | 50 | −19 | 19 | |
| 10 | Sutherland Sharks | 22 | 5 | 1 | 16 | 29 | 55 | −26 | 16 | |
| 11 | Sydney FC Youth | 22 | 6 | 2 | 14 | 34 | 52 | −18 | 14 (Note: Sydney FC Youth six points deducted for misconduct.) | |
| 12 | Parramatta FC (R) | 22 | 1 | 3 | 18 | 16 | 60 | −44 | 6 | Relegation to the 2018 NPL NSW 2 (Note: Promotion and Relegation system based on Club Championship and including points from U20 and U18 teams.) |

Source: sportstg.com
Rules for classification: 1) points; 2) goal difference; 3) number of goals scored.
(C) Champions; (R) Relegated

==== Finals ====
Qualifying final
2 | Blacktown City | 2
3 | Rockdale City | 4
4 | Manly United | 2
5 | Sydney Olympic | 1

Major semi-final
1 | APIA Leichhardt | 5
3 | Rockdale City | 0
Minor semi-final
2 | Blacktown City | 0
4 | Manly United | 2

Preliminary final
3 | Rockdale City | 2 (4)
4 | Manly United | 2 (5)

Grand final
1 | APIA Leichhardt | 0 (3)
4 | Manly United | 0 (4)

=== Northern NSW ===
| Pos | Team | Pld | W | D | L | GF | GA | GD | Pts | Qualification or relegation |
|---|---|---|---|---|---|---|---|---|---|---|
| 1 | Edgeworth Eagles | 20 | 13 | 4 | 3 | 42 | 14 | +28 | 43 | 2017 National Premier Leagues Finals |
| 2 | Hamilton Olympic | 20 | 12 | 4 | 4 | 39 | 20 | +19 | 40 | 2017 Northern NSW Finals |
| 3 | Lambton Jaffas (C) | 20 | 12 | 3 | 5 | 49 | 29 | +20 | 39 | 2017 Northern NSW Finals |
| 4 | Broadmeadow Magic | 20 | 12 | 3 | 5 | 39 | 27 | +12 | 39 | 2017 Northern NSW Finals |
| 5 | Valentine FC | 20 | 11 | 2 | 7 | 35 | 32 | +3 | 35 | |
| 6 | Maitland | 20 | 9 | 4 | 7 | 40 | 30 | +10 | 31 | |
| 7 | Lake Macquarie City | 20 | 6 | 5 | 9 | 27 | 39 | −12 | 23 | |
| 8 | Charlestown City Blues | 20 | 5 | 4 | 11 | 25 | 33 | −8 | 19 | |
| 9 | Adamstown Rosebud | 20 | 5 | 4 | 11 | 27 | 48 | −21 | 19 | |
| 10 | Newcastle Jets Youth | 20 | 4 | 3 | 13 | 32 | 55 | −23 | 15 | |
| 11 | Weston Workers | 20 | 1 | 4 | 15 | 18 | 46 | −28 | 7 | |

Source: sportstg.com
Rules for classification: 1) points; 2) goal difference; 3) number of goals scored.
(C) Champions

==== Finals ====
Semi-finals
1 | Edgeworth Eagles (pen.) | 1 | 1 | 2 (3)
4 | Broadmeadow Magic | 0 | 2 | 2 (1)
2 | Hamilton Olympic | 1 | 1 | 2
3 | Lambton Jaffas | 2 | 2 | 4

Grand Final
1 | Edgeworth Eagles | 0
3 | Lambton Jaffas (a.e.t.) | 2

=== Queensland ===
| Pos | Team | Pld | W | D | L | GF | GA | GD | Pts | Qualification or relegation |
|---|---|---|---|---|---|---|---|---|---|---|
| 1 | Brisbane Strikers | 22 | 16 | 3 | 3 | 68 | 21 | +47 | 51 | 2017 National Premier Leagues Finals |
| 2 | Gold Coast City | 22 | 15 | 3 | 4 | 59 | 25 | +34 | 48 | 2017 NPL Queensland Finals |
| 3 | Western Pride (C) | 22 | 12 | 5 | 5 | 73 | 27 | +46 | 41 | 2017 NPL Queensland Finals |
| 4 | Moreton Bay United | 22 | 12 | 5 | 5 | 49 | 27 | +22 | 41 | 2017 NPL Queensland Finals |
| 5 | Olympic FC | 22 | 12 | 4 | 6 | 57 | 27 | +30 | 40 | |
| 6 | Brisbane City | 22 | 12 | 1 | 9 | 51 | 32 | +19 | 37 | |
| 7 | Far North Queensland | 22 | 9 | 4 | 9 | 38 | 37 | +1 | 31 | |
| 8 | Northern Fury | 22 | 7 | 4 | 11 | 36 | 55 | −19 | 25 | |
| 9 | Redlands United | 22 | 6 | 4 | 12 | 30 | 53 | −23 | 22 | |
| 10 | South West Queensland Thunder | 22 | 6 | 2 | 14 | 30 | 53 | −23 | 20 | |
| 11 | Brisbane Roar Youth | 22 | 5 | 3 | 14 | 33 | 66 | −33 | 18 | |
| 12 | Sunshine Coast | 22 | 0 | 2 | 20 | 18 | 117 | −99 | 2 | |

Source: sportstg.com
Rules for classification: 1) points; 2) goal difference; 3) number of goals scored.
(C) Champions

==== Finals ====
Semi-finals
1 | Brisbane Strikers | 1
4 | Moreton Bay United | 3
2 | Gold Coast City | 0
3 | Western Pride | 3

Grand Final
3 | Western Pride | 2
4 | Moreton Bay United | 1

=== South Australia ===
| Pos | Team | Pld | W | D | L | GF | GA | GD | Pts | Qualification or relegation |
|---|---|---|---|---|---|---|---|---|---|---|
| 1 | North Eastern MetroStars | 22 | 14 | 5 | 3 | 48 | 26 | +22 | 47 | 2017 South Australia Finals |
| 2 | Adelaide Comets | 22 | 12 | 3 | 7 | 50 | 30 | +20 | 39 | 2017 South Australia Finals |
| 3 | Croydon Kings (C) | 22 | 11 | 3 | 8 | 24 | 24 | 0 | 36 | 2017 South Australia Finals |
| 4 | West Adelaide | 22 | 10 | 4 | 8 | 44 | 39 | +5 | 34 | 2017 South Australia Finals |
| 5 | Para Hills Knights | 22 | 11 | 0 | 11 | 28 | 36 | −8 | 33 | 2017 South Australia Finals |
| 6 | Adelaide City (Note: Following a sanction by the independent Disciplinary Committee, Adelaide City had 18 competition points removed, resulting in the loss of the League Premiers title.) | 22 | 16 | 2 | 4 | 60 | 19 | +41 | 32 | 2017 National Premier Leagues Finals |
| 7 | Adelaide Olympic | 22 | 9 | 3 | 10 | 33 | 42 | −9 | 30 | |
| 8 | West Torrens Birkalla | 22 | 7 | 6 | 9 | 32 | 34 | −2 | 27 | |
| 9 | Campbelltown City | 22 | 7 | 4 | 11 | 33 | 36 | −3 | 25 | |
| 10 | Adelaide United Youth | 22 | 7 | 3 | 12 | 31 | 54 | −23 | 24 | |
| 11 | Adelaide Blue Eagles (R) | 22 | 5 | 5 | 12 | 33 | 49 | −16 | 20 | Relegation to the 2018 SA State League 1 |
| 12 | Cumberland United (R) | 22 | 3 | 2 | 17 | 16 | 43 | −27 | 11 | Relegation to the 2018 SA State League 1 |

Source: sportstg.com
Rules for classification: 1) points; 2) goal difference; 3) number of goals scored.
(C) Champions; (R) Relegated

==== Finals ====
Elimination finals
3 | Adelaide Comets | 3
6 | Para Hills Knights | 2
4 | Croydon Kings | 2
5 | West Adelaide | 1

Semifinals
1 | North Eastern MetroStars | 0
2 | Adelaide City | 1
Adelaide Comets | 2
Croydon Kings | 4

Preliminary final
North Eastern MetroStars | 1
Croydon Kings | 2

Grand final
Adelaide City | 1
Croydon Kings | 2

=== Tasmania ===
| Pos | Team | Pld | W | D | L | GF | GA | GD | Pts | Qualification or relegation |
|---|---|---|---|---|---|---|---|---|---|---|
| 1 | South Hobart (C) | 21 | 18 | 1 | 2 | 87 | 19 | +68 | 55 | 2017 National Premier Leagues Finals |
| 2 | Olympia | 21 | 13 | 4 | 4 | 59 | 28 | +31 | 43 | 2017 League Cup |
| 3 | Devonport City | 21 | 13 | 2 | 6 | 53 | 30 | +23 | 41 | 2017 League Cup |
| 4 | Hobart Zebras | 21 | 9 | 6 | 6 | 49 | 19 | +30 | 33 | 2017 League Cup |
| 5 | Northern Rangers | 21 | 5 | 5 | 11 | 27 | 51 | −24 | 20 | 2017 League Cup |
| 6 | Launceston City | 21 | 5 | 3 | 13 | 25 | 58 | −33 | 18 | 2017 League Cup |
| 7 | Clarence United | 21 | 4 | 4 | 13 | 23 | 70 | −47 | 16 | |
| 8 | Kingborough Lions United | 21 | 2 | 5 | 14 | 16 | 64 | −48 | 11 | |

Source: socceraust.co.uk
Rules for classification: 1) points; 2) goal difference; 3) number of goals scored.
(C) Champions

==== Finals ====
Quarter-finals
Somerset | 2
South Hobart (aet) | 3
Devonport City | 2 (5)
Northern Rangers (pen.) | 2 (6)
Olympia | 2
Hobart Zebras | 1
Glenorchy Knights | 3
Launceston City | 2

Semi-finals
South Hobart | 3
Northern Rangers | 0
Olympia | 6
Glenorchy Knights | 2

Grand final
South Hobart | 7
Olympia | 0

=== Victoria ===
| Pos | Team | Pld | W | D | L | GF | GA | GD | Pts | Qualification or relegation |
|---|---|---|---|---|---|---|---|---|---|---|
| 1 | Heidelberg United | 26 | 17 | 3 | 6 | 53 | 27 | +26 | 54 | 2017 National Premier Leagues Finals |
| 2 | South Melbourne | 26 | 15 | 3 | 8 | 49 | 28 | +21 | 48 | 2017 Victoria Finals |
| 3 | Avondale FC | 26 | 14 | 6 | 6 | 28 | 21 | +7 | 48 | 2017 Victoria Finals |
| 4 | Bentleigh Greens (C) | 26 | 13 | 7 | 6 | 44 | 30 | +14 | 46 | 2017 Victoria Finals |
| 5 | Green Gully | 26 | 12 | 9 | 5 | 50 | 37 | +13 | 45 | 2017 Victoria Finals |
| 6 | Oakleigh Cannons | 26 | 11 | 10 | 5 | 43 | 23 | +20 | 43 | 2017 Victoria Finals |
| 7 | Pascoe Vale | 26 | 12 | 7 | 7 | 35 | 27 | +8 | 43 | |
| 8 | Hume City | 26 | 9 | 8 | 9 | 31 | 26 | +5 | 35 | |
| 9 | Bulleen Lions | 26 | 9 | 5 | 12 | 39 | 42 | −3 | 32 | |
| 10 | Kingston City | 26 | 8 | 7 | 11 | 37 | 42 | −5 | 31 | |
| 11 | Port Melbourne | 26 | 7 | 6 | 13 | 36 | 44 | −8 | 27 | |
| 12 | Melbourne Knights | 26 | 6 | 6 | 14 | 31 | 48 | −17 | 24 | 2017 relegation play-offs |
| 13 | St Albans Saints (R) | 26 | 3 | 6 | 17 | 20 | 56 | −36 | 15 | Relegation to the 2018 NPL Victoria 2 |
| 14 | North Geelong Warriors (R) | 26 | 1 | 7 | 18 | 21 | 67 | −46 | 10 | Relegation to the 2018 NPL Victoria 2 |

Source: sportstg.com
Rules for classification: 1) points; 2) goal difference; 3) number of goals scored.
(C) Champions; (R) Relegated

==== Finals ====
Elimination Finals
3 | Avondale | 1
6 | Oakleigh Cannons (aet) | 2
4 | Bentleigh Greens | 4
5 | Green Gully | 0

Semi-finals
1 | Heidelberg United | 2
6 | Oakleigh Cannons | 0
2 | South Melbourne | 2 (3)
4 | Bentleigh Greens | 2 (5)

Final
1 | Heidelberg United | 1
4 | Bentleigh Greens (aet) | 2

=== Western Australia ===
| Pos | Team | Pld | W | D | L | GF | GA | GD | Pts | Qualification or relegation |
|---|---|---|---|---|---|---|---|---|---|---|
| 1 | Bayswater City (C) | 26 | 17 | 5 | 4 | 55 | 33 | +22 | 56 | 2017 National Premier Leagues Finals |
| 2 | Inglewood United | 26 | 16 | 7 | 3 | 73 | 33 | +40 | 55 | 2017 Western Australia Finals |
| 3 | Perth SC | 26 | 17 | 3 | 6 | 62 | 30 | +32 | 54 | 2017 Western Australia Finals |
| 4 | Sorrento | 26 | 14 | 5 | 7 | 53 | 34 | +19 | 47 | 2017 Western Australia Finals |
| 5 | Floreat Athena | 26 | 14 | 5 | 7 | 42 | 31 | +11 | 47 | |
| 6 | ECU Joondalup | 26 | 11 | 6 | 9 | 56 | 43 | +13 | 39 | |
| 7 | Stirling Lions | 26 | 10 | 5 | 11 | 40 | 43 | −3 | 35 | |
| 8 | Subiaco AFC | 26 | 11 | 2 | 13 | 39 | 48 | −9 | 35 | |
| 9 | Cockburn City | 26 | 8 | 7 | 11 | 38 | 42 | −4 | 31 | |
| 10 | Joondalup United | 26 | 8 | 7 | 11 | 46 | 60 | −14 | 31 | |
| 11 | Armadale | 26 | 7 | 6 | 13 | 34 | 51 | −17 | 27 | |
| 12 | Perth Glory Youth | 26 | 5 | 4 | 17 | 28 | 49 | −21 | 19 | |
| 13 | Balcatta | 26 | 5 | 4 | 17 | 25 | 54 | −29 | 19 | |
| 14 | Mandurah City (R) | 26 | 3 | 6 | 17 | 21 | 61 | −40 | 15 | Qualification to the 2017 relegation play-off |

Source: sportstg.com
Rules for classification: 1) points; 2) goal difference; 3) number of goals scored.
(C) Champions; (R) Relegated

==== Finals ====
Semi-finals
1 | Bayswater City | 4
2 | Inglewood United | 1
3 | Perth | 4
4 | Sorrento | 1

Elimination final
2 | Inglewood United | 0
3 | Perth | 3

Grand final
1 | Bayswater City | 3
3 | Perth | 0

== Final Series ==
The winner of each league competition (top of the table) in the NPL competed in a single match knockout tournament to decide the National Premier Leagues Champion for 2017. The quarter final match-ups were decided by an open draw. Home advantage for the semi-finals and final was based on a formula relating to time of winning (normal time, extra time or penalties), goals scored and allowed, and yellow/red cards. The winner also qualified for the 2018 FFA Cup Round of 32.

| Club | Qualified From | Participation |
|---|---|---|
| Canberra Olympic | (Australian Capital Territory) ACT | 2nd |
| APIA Leichhardt Tigers | (New South Wales) NSW | 1st |
| Edgeworth Eagles | (New South Wales) Northern NSW | 3rd |
| Brisbane Strikers | Queensland | 2nd |
| Adelaide City | South Australia | 2nd |
| South Hobart | Tasmania | 3rd |
| Heidelberg United | (Victoria (state)) Victoria | 1st |
| Bayswater City | Western Australia | 3rd |

Quarter-finals
(Australian Capital Territory) Canberra Olympic | 1
(New South Wales) Edgeworth Eagles | 4
(Tasmania) South Hobart | 2
(Queensland) Brisbane Strikers | 4
(Western Australia) Bayswater City | 1
(Victoria (state)) Heidelberg United (a.e.t.) | 3
(South Australia) Adelaide City | 0
(New South Wales) APIA Leichhardt Tigers | 1

Semi-finals
(New South Wales) Edgeworth Eagles | 0
(Queensland) Brisbane Strikers | 2
(Victoria (state)) Heidelberg United | 2
(New South Wales) APIA Leichhardt Tigers | 1

Grand Final
(Queensland) Brisbane Strikers | 0
(Victoria (state)) Heidelberg United | 2

=== Quarter-finals ===
16 September
14:00 ACST

| Adelaide City (South Australia) | 0–1 | (New South Wales) APIA Leichhardt Tigers |
|---|---|---|
| | Report | Sekiya 73' |

Adelaide City Park, Oakden
Attendance: 632
Referee: Rick Schneider

17 September
12:00 AWST

| Bayswater City (Western Australia) | 1–3 (a.e.t.) | (Victoria (state)) Heidelberg United |
|---|---|---|
| Marulanda 45+3' (pen.) | Report | Athiu 36' (pen.), 97'; Ellis 102' |

Perth Plasterboard Centre Stadium, Perth
Attendance: 435
Referee: David Bruce

16 September
17:00 AEST

| Canberra Olympic (Australian Capital Territory) | 1–4 | (New South Wales) Edgeworth |
|---|---|---|
| Tsekenis 26' | Report | Sanders 15'; Evans 44'; McBreen 75', 89' |

Deakin Stadium, Canberra
Attendance: 235
Referee: Luke Withell

17 September
12:30 AEST

| South Hobart (Tasmania) | 2–4 | (Queensland) Brisbane Strikers |
|---|---|---|
| Turner 72', 79' | Report | Palmer 8'; McLean 10', 91'; Stewart 62' (pen.) |

South Hobart Ground, Hobart
Attendance: 803
Referee: Brenton Kopra

=== Semi-finals ===
23 September
13:00 AEST

| Heidelberg United (Victoria (state)) | 2–1 | (New South Wales) APIA Leichhardt Tigers |
|---|---|---|
| Noon 56'; Cartanos 83' | Report | Biczo 28' |

Olympic Park, Melbourne
Attendance: 891
Referee: Chris Hope

24 September
13:30 AEST

| Edgeworth (New South Wales) | 0–2 | (Queensland) Brisbane Strikers |
|---|---|---|
| | Report | Stewart 28'; Lee 90+5' |

Jack McLaughlan Oval, Newcastle
Attendance: 470
Referee: Stephen Laurie

=== Grand Final ===
30 September
18:00 AEST

| Brisbane Strikers (Queensland) | 0–2 | (Victoria (state)) Heidelberg United |
|---|---|---|
| | Report | Zahra 41'; Ellis 61' |

Perry Park, Brisbane
Attendance: 1,105
Referee: Adrian Arndt

== Individual honours ==
Sean Ellis from Heidelberg United won the John Kosmina Medal for the best player in the NPL Grand Final.
