= 2015 National Premier Leagues =

National Premier Leagues
- Season: 2015
- Champions: Blacktown City (1st Title)
- Finalists: Bayswater City; Blacktown City; Canberra; Edgeworth; Moreton Bay United; Olympia; South Melbourne; West Adelaide

The 2015 National Premier Leagues was the third season of the Australian National Premier Leagues soccer competition. The league competition was played amongst eight separate divisions, divided by FFA state and territory member federations. The divisions are ACT, NSW, Northern NSW, Queensland, South Australia, Tasmania, Victoria and Western Australia.

The winners of each respective divisional league competed in a finals playoff tournament at season end, with Blacktown City crowned as National Premier Leagues Champions, which gave them direct qualification for the 2016 FFA Cup Round of 32.

== League tables ==
=== ACT ===
Pos	Team	Pld	W	D	L	GF	GA	GD	Pts	Qualification or relegation
1	Canberra	16	11	3	2	53	27	+26	36	2015 National Premier Leagues Finals
2	Tigers FC	16	12	1	3	52	27	+25	34 (Note: Tigers FC were penalised three competition points due to a breach of NPL playing roster conditions.)	2015 ACT Finals
3	Belconnen United	16	10	4	2	38	24	+14	34	2015 ACT Finals
4	FFA Centre of Excellence	16	8	4	4	38	30	+8	28	
5	Canberra Olympic (C)	16	7	4	5	38	21	+17	25	2015 ACT Finals
6	Gungahlin United	16	7	4	5	33	30	+3	25	
7	Woden Weston	16	3	2	11	20	40	−20	11	
8	Monaro Panthers	16	2	2	12	19	48	−29	8	
9	Tuggeranong United	16	0	0	16	12	56	−44	0	

Source: foxsportspulse.com
Rules for classification: 1) points; 2) goal difference; 3) number of goals scored.
(C) Champions

==== Finals ====
Semi-finals
1	Canberra	2
2	Tigers FC	1
3	Belconnen United	2
5	Canberra Olympic	4

Preliminary Final
2	Tigers FC	1
5	Canberra Olympic	4

Grand Final
1	Canberra	1
5	Canberra Olympic	3

=== NSW ===
Pos	Team	Pld	W	D	L	GF	GA	GD	Pts	Qualification or relegation
1	Blacktown City	22	15	5	2	54	23	+31	50	2015 National Premier Leagues Finals
2	APIA Leichhardt Tigers	22	13	6	3	56	31	+25	45	2015 NSW Finals
3	Bonnyrigg White Eagles (C)	22	13	4	5	49	35	+14	43	2015 NSW Finals
4	Sydney Olympic	22	13	3	6	45	31	+14	42	2015 NSW Finals
5	South Coast Wolves	22	9	5	8	31	36	−5	32	2015 NSW Finals
6	Rockdale City Suns	22	9	3	10	31	33	−2	30	
7	Sydney United 58	22	9	1	12	38	45	−7	28	
8	Manly United	22	8	3	11	39	38	+1	27	
9	Blacktown Spartans	22	8	3	11	40	51	−11	27	
10	Sutherland Sharks	22	7	3	12	36	42	−6	24	
11	Parramatta FC	22	5	5	12	22	35	−13	20	
12	Marconi Stallions (R)	22	2	1	19	14	55	−41	7	Relegated to the 2016 NPL NSW 2 (Note: Promotion and Relegation system based on Club Championship and including points from U20 and U18 teams.)

Source: foxsportspulse.com
Rules for classification: 1) points; 2) goal difference; 3) number of goals scored.
(C) Champions; (R) Relegated

==== Finals ====
Qualifying final
2	APIA Leichhardt Tigers	1
3	Bonnyrigg White Eagles	3
4	Sydney Olympic	2
5	South Coast Wolves	0

Major semi-final
1	Blacktown City	2
3	Bonnyrigg White Eagles	4
Minor semi-final
2	APIA Leichhardt Tigers	1
4	Sydney Olympic	0

Preliminary final
1	Blacktown City	6
2	APIA Leichhardt Tigers	1

Grand final
1	Blacktown City	0
3	Bonnyrigg White Eagles	2

=== Northern NSW ===
Pos	Team	Pld	W	D	L	GF	GA	GD	Pts	Qualification or relegation
1	Edgeworth Eagles (C)	18	13	1	4	39	22	+17	40	2015 National Premier Leagues Finals
2	Lambton Jaffas	18	11	4	3	42	22	+20	37	2015 Northern NSW Finals
3	Hamilton Olympic	18	10	6	2	46	22	+24	36	2015 Northern NSW Finals
4	Broadmeadow Magic	18	10	2	6	43	26	+17	32	2015 Northern NSW Finals
5	Weston Workers	18	9	2	7	24	26	−2	29	
6	Adamstown Rosebud	18	8	4	6	29	30	−1	28	
7	Newcastle Jets Youth	18	5	2	11	34	46	−12	17	
8	Maitland	18	4	3	11	21	33	−12	15	
9	Charlestown City Blues	18	4	1	13	18	43	−25	13	
10	South Cardiff (R)	18	2	3	13	22	48	−26	9	Relegated to the 2016 NNSW State League 1

Source: foxsportspulse.com
Rules for classification: 1) points; 2) goal difference; 3) number of goals scored.
(C) Champions; (R) Relegated

==== Finals ====
Semi-finals
1	Edgeworth (a)	3	0	3
4	Broadmeadow Magic	3	0	3
2	Lambton Jaffas	1	2	3
3	Hamilton Olympic	2	2	4

Grand Final
1	Edgeworth	2
3	Hamilton Olympic	0

=== Queensland ===
Pos	Team	Pld	W	D	L	GF	GA	GD	Pts	Qualification or relegation
1	Moreton Bay United (C)	22	14	5	3	54	25	+29	47	2015 National Premier Leagues Finals
2	Brisbane Strikers	22	14	5	3	49	22	+27	47	2015 Queensland Finals
3	Redlands United	22	12	3	7	50	28	+22	39	2015 Queensland Finals
4	Olympic FC	22	12	3	7	55	36	+19	39	2015 Queensland Finals
5	Palm Beach	22	10	5	7	36	26	+10	35	
6	Brisbane Roar Youth	22	9	5	8	50	34	+16	32	
7	Far North Queensland	22	9	4	9	49	39	+10	31	
8	Northern Fury	22	10	1	11	42	44	−2	31	
9	Brisbane City	22	8	2	12	41	52	−11	26	
10	Sunshine Coast	22	7	3	12	33	48	−15	24	
11	Western Pride	22	7	2	13	39	57	−18	23	
12	South West Queensland Thunder	22	0	2	20	16	97	−81	2	

Source: foxsportspulse.com
Rules for classification: 1) points; 2) goal difference; 3) number of goals scored.
(C) Champions

==== Finals ====
Semi-finals
1	Moreton Bay United	3
4	Olympic	1
2	Brisbane Strikers	2
3	Redlands United	1

Grand Final
1	Moreton Bay United	2
2	Brisbane Strikers	1

=== South Australia ===
Pos	Team	Pld	W	D	L	GF	GA	GD	Pts	Qualification or relegation
1	West Adelaide (C)	26	14	9	3	52	26	+26	51	2015 National Premier Leagues Finals
2	Adelaide Blue Eagles	26	14	8	4	55	28	+27	50	2015 South Australia Finals
3	West Torrens Birkalla	26	15	4	7	57	40	+17	49	2015 South Australia Finals
4	Croydon Kings	26	14	6	6	49	38	+11	48	2015 South Australia Finals
5	Adelaide City	26	14	4	8	69	39	+30	46	2015 South Australia Finals
6	Campbelltown City	26	13	7	6	44	36	+8	46	2015 South Australia Finals
7	North Eastern MetroStars	26	11	6	9	44	37	+7	39	
8	Adelaide Comets	26	11	1	14	34	49	−15	34	
9	South Adelaide	26	8	6	12	42	56	−14	30	
10	Adelaide Raiders	26	8	3	15	43	45	−2	27	
11	Port Adelaide Pirates (R)	26	7	6	13	37	56	−19	27	Qualification to the 2015 relegation play-offs
12	Modbury Jets (R)	26	7	6	13	29	55	−26	27	Relegation to the 2016 SA State League 1
13	White City (R)	26	2	11	13	26	48	−22	17	Relegation to the 2016 SA State League 1
14	Para Hills Knights (R)	26	3	5	18	30	56	−26	14	Relegation to the 2016 SA State League 1

Source: foxsportspulse.com
Rules for classification: 1) points; 2) goal difference; 3) number of goals scored.
(C) Champions; (R) Relegated

==== Finals ====
Elimination finals
3	West Torrens Birkalla	0 (5)
6	Campbelltown City	0 (4)
4	Croydon Kings	1 (1)
5	Adelaide City	1 (3)

Semifinals
1	Adelaide Blue Eagles	1
2	West Adelaide	1
West Torrens Birkalla	1
Adelaide City	0

Preliminary final
West Adelaide	5
West Torrens Birkalla	2

Grand final
Adelaide Blue Eagles	0
West Adelaide	3

=== Tasmania ===
Pos	Team	Pld	W	D	L	GF	GA	GD	Pts	Qualification or relegation
1	Olympia (C)	21	15	3	3	83	14	+69	48	2015 National Premier Leagues Finals
2	South Hobart	21	15	1	5	73	27	+46	46	2015 Victory Cup
3	Hobart Zebras	21	12	5	4	57	24	+33	41	2015 Victory Cup
4	Northern Rangers	21	8	7	6	63	34	+29	31	2015 Victory Cup
5	Launceston City	21	7	3	11	39	51	−12	24	2015 Victory Cup
6	Kingborough Lions United	21	7	2	12	37	60	−23	23	2015 Victory Cup
7	Devonport City	21	6	3	12	42	51	−9	21	
8	Glenorchy Knights (R)	21	2	0	19	15	148	−133	6	Relegated to the 2016 Tasmanian Championship

Source: foxsportspulse.com
Rules for classification: 1) points; 2) goal difference; 3) number of goals scored.
(C) Champions; (R) Relegated

==== Finals ====
An end of season finals series for the Victory Cup was held using an expanded format, which included the top six teams from the Victory League as well as the premiers from the Northern Championship (Somerset) and Southern Championship (University of Tasmania). The quarter-final and semi-final matches were decided by random draw.

Quarter-finals
Kingborough Lions	0
Hobart Zebras	5
South Hobart	2
Somerset	1
University of Tasmania	5
Launceston City	1
Olympia	1
Northern Rangers	0

Semi-finals
Hobart Zebras	3
South Hobart	0
University of Tasmania	4 (2)
Olympia	4 (4)

Final
Hobart Zebras	1
Olympia	3

=== Victoria ===
Pos	Team	Pld	W	D	L	GF	GA	GD	Pts	Qualification or relegation
1	South Melbourne	26	18	4	4	58	22	+36	58	2015 National Premier Leagues Finals
2	Bentleigh Greens (C)	26	17	7	2	48	25	+23	58	2015 Victoria Finals
3	Heidelberg United	26	15	6	5	51	29	+22	51	2015 Victoria Finals
4	Melbourne Knights	26	15	5	6	39	27	+12	50	2015 Victoria Finals
5	Hume City	26	13	5	8	41	28	+13	44	2015 Victoria Finals
6	Pascoe Vale	26	12	4	10	34	30	+4	40	2015 Victoria Finals
7	Green Gully	26	11	4	11	52	45	+7	37	
8	Port Melbourne	26	9	6	11	37	34	+3	33	
9	Avondale FC	26	8	7	11	37	42	−5	31	
10	Northcote City	26	9	3	14	32	49	−17	30	
11	Oakleigh Cannons	26	7	5	14	33	41	−8	26	
12	North Geelong Warriors (R)	26	6	3	17	30	52	−22	21	2015 relegation play-offs
13	Werribee City (R)	26	4	6	16	20	50	−30	18	Relegation to 2016 NPL Victoria 2
14	Dandenong Thunder (R)	26	4	3	19	30	69	−39	15	Relegation to 2016 NPL Victoria 2

Rules for classification: 1) points; 2) goal difference; 3) number of goals scored.
(C) Champions; (R) Relegated

==== Finals ====
Quarter-finals
3	Heidelberg United	2 (0)
6	Pascoe Vale	2 (3)
4	Melbourne Knights	2 (0)
5	Hume City	2 (2)

Semi-finals
1	South Melbourne	3
6	Pascoe Vale	2
2	Bentleigh Greens	2
5	Hume City	0

Final
1	South Melbourne	1
2	Bentleigh Greens	3

=== Western Australia ===
Pos	Team	Pld	W	D	L	GF	GA	GD	Pts	Qualification or relegation
1	Bayswater City (C)	22	19	3	0	64	21	+43	60	2015 National Premier Leagues Finals
2	Perth SC	22	16	2	4	50	23	+27	50	
3	Floreat Athena	22	15	3	4	61	34	+27	48	
4	Sorrento	22	12	3	7	41	31	+10	39	
5	Cockburn City	22	9	3	10	41	50	−9	30	
6	Balcatta	22	8	3	11	44	44	0	27	
7	Inglewood United	22	8	3	11	28	46	−18	27	
8	Stirling Lions	22	8	2	12	42	55	−13	26	
9	Subiaco AFC	22	6	2	14	27	36	−9	20	
10	ECU Joondalup	22	5	4	13	37	55	−18	19	
11	Perth Glory Youth	22	5	3	14	33	48	−15	18	
12	Armadale	22	4	3	15	29	54	−25	15	

Source: foxsportspulse.com
Rules for classification: 1) points; 2) goal difference; 3) number of goals scored.
(C) Champions

== Final Series ==
The winner of each league competition (top of the table) in the NPL competed in a single match knockout tournament to decide the National Premier Leagues Champion for 2015. For the quarter-final stage the participants were matched up based on geographical proximity. The winner also qualified for the 2016 FFA Cup Round of 32.

Club	Qualified From	Participation
Canberra	(Australian Capital Territory) ACT	2nd
Blacktown City	(New South Wales) NSW	1st
Edgeworth Eagles	(New South Wales) Northern NSW	1st
Moreton Bay United	Queensland	1st
West Adelaide	South Australia	1st
Olympia	Tasmania	1st
South Melbourne	(Victoria (state)) Victoria	2nd
Bayswater City	Western Australia	2nd

Quarter-finals
(South Australia) West Adelaide	1
(Western Australia) Bayswater City	2
(Victoria (state)) South Melbourne	1
(Tasmania) Olympia	2
(New South Wales) Blacktown City	4
(Australian Capital Territory) Canberra	1
(Queensland) Moreton Bay United	3
(New South Wales) Edgeworth Eagles	1

Semi-finals
(Western Australia) Bayswater City	6
(Tasmania) Olympia	0
(New South Wales) Blacktown City	2
(Queensland) Moreton Bay United	1

Grand Final
(Western Australia) Bayswater City	1
(New South Wales) Blacktown City	3

=== Quarter-finals ===
19 September 2015
16:00 AEST

South Melbourne (Victoria (state))	1–2	(Tasmania) Olympia
Lujic 61'	Report	Nichols 3'; Mala 30' (o.g.); Hickey (yellow card) 22' (yellow-red card) 54'

Lakeside Stadium, Melbourne
Referee: Lucien Laverdure

19 September 2015
19:30 AEST

Moreton Bay United (Queensland)	3–1	(New South Wales) Edgeworth Eagles
Mendy 40'; Hall 72'; Farina 74' (pen.)	Report	Bizzarri 90+1'

QSAC, Brisbane
Referee: Alex King

20 September 2015
14:30 ACST

West Adelaide (South Australia)	1–2	(Western Australia) Bayswater City
Coyne 12' (o.g.)	Report	Heagney 77'; Dixon 80'

Adelaide Shores Football Centre, Adelaide
Referee: Daniel Elder

20 September 2015
16:00 AEST

Blacktown City (New South Wales)	4–1	(Australian Capital Territory) Canberra
Mallia 3'; Antelmi 21' (red card) 40'; Major 30'; Gibbs 66'	Report	James (red card) 48'; Subasic 90'

Lilys Homes Stadium, Sydney
Referee: Ben Abraham

=== Semi-finals ===
Home field advantage was based on a formula relating to the quarter final results - time of winning (normal time, extra time or penalties), goals scored and allowed, and yellow/red cards.

26 September 2015
19:30 AEST

Blacktown City (New South Wales)	2–1	(Queensland) Moreton Bay United
Major 14'; Henderson 30' (o.g.)	Report	Green 63'

Lilys Homes Stadium, Sydney
Referee: Kurt Ams

27 September 2015
14:30 AWST

Bayswater City (Western Australia)	6–0	(Tasmania) Olympia
Heagney 12', 64', 74'; Marulanda 28'; Sam 73', 88'	Report

Frank Drago Reserve, Perth
Referee: Adam Field

=== Grand Final ===
Home field advantage was based on a formula relating to the combined quarter-final and semi final results - time of winning (normal time, extra time or penalties), goals scored and allowed, and yellow/red cards.

3 October 2015
18:30 AWST

Bayswater City (Western Australia)	1–3	(New South Wales) Blacktown City
Marulanda 51'	Report	Gibbs 13', 55'; Mallia 26'

Dorrien Gardens, Perth
Referee: Matthew Cropper

== Individual honours ==
Joey Gibbs from Blacktown City won the John Kosmina Medal for the best player in the NPL Grand Final.
