= 2017 Football Federation Tasmania season =

Football Federation Tasmania
- Season: 2017

The Football Federation Tasmania 2017 season was the fifth season under the new competition format in Tasmania. The competition consists of three major divisions across the State of Tasmania, created from the teams in the previous structure. The overall premier for the new structure qualified for the National Premier Leagues finals series, competing with the other state federation champions in a final knock-out tournament to decide the National Premier Leagues Champion for 2017.

== Men's competitions ==
=== 2017 NPL Tasmania ===
NPL Tasmania
- Season: 2017
- Premiers: South Hobart
- Matches: 56

The 2017 NPL Tasmania season was played as a triple round-robin over 21 rounds, from 10 March to 19 August.

Pos	Team	Pld	W	D	L	GF	GA	GD	Pts	Qualification or relegation
1	South Hobart (C)	21	18	1	2	87	19	+68	55	2017 National Premier Leagues Finals
2	Olympia	21	13	4	4	59	28	+31	43	2017 League Cup
3	Devonport City	21	13	2	6	53	30	+23	41	2017 League Cup
4	Hobart Zebras	21	9	6	6	49	19	+30	33	2017 League Cup
5	Northern Rangers	21	5	5	11	27	51	−24	20	2017 League Cup
6	Launceston City	21	5	3	13	25	58	−33	18	2017 League Cup
7	Clarence United	21	4	4	13	23	70	−47	16	
8	Kingborough Lions United	21	2	5	14	16	64	−48	11	

Source: socceraust.co.uk
Rules for classification: 1) points; 2) goal difference; 3) number of goals scored.
(C) Champions

==== League Cup ====
A separate end of season finals series for the League Cup was again held using the same format as the previous year, which included the top six teams from the NPL Tasmania as well as the premiers from the Northern Championship and Southern Championship.

Quarter-finals
Somerset	2
South Hobart (aet)	3
Devonport City	2 (5)
Northern Rangers (pen.)	2 (6)
Olympia	2
Hobart Zebras	1
Glenorchy Knights	3
Launceston City	2

Semi-finals
South Hobart	3
Northern Rangers	0
Olympia	6
Glenorchy Knights	2

Grand final
South Hobart	7
Olympia	0

=== 2017 Tasmanian Championships ===
==== 2017 Northern Championship ====
Northern Championship
- Season: 2017
- Biggest home win: Devonport City B 6-0 Ulverstone (25 March 2017)
- Biggest away win: Burnie United 1-9 Somerset (8 April 2017)
- Highest scoring: Burnie United 1-9 Somerset (8 April 2017)

The 2017 Northern Championship is the fourth edition of the Northern Championship as the second level domestic association football competition in Tasmania (third level overall in Australia). The league will consist of 8 teams, playing 21 matches.

Pos	Team	Pld	W	D	L	GF	GA	GD	Pts	Qualification or relegation
1	Somerset (C)	21	20	0	1	93	21	+72	60	2017 League Cup
2	Devonport City B	21	12	2	7	58	41	+17	38	
3	Launceston United	21	10	1	10	60	47	+13	31	
4	Launceston City B	21	9	3	9	53	50	+3	30	
5	Ulverstone	21	9	2	10	41	56	−15	29	
6	Northern Rangers B	21	9	1	11	38	56	−18	28	
7	Riverside Olympic	21	3	6	12	32	62	−30	15	
8	Burnie United	21	4	1	16	28	70	−42	13	

Source: sportstg.com
Rules for classification: 1) points; 2) goal difference; 3) number of goals scored.
(C) Champions

==== 2017 Southern Championship ====
Southern Championship
- Season: 2017
- Biggest home win: Beachside 11-0 Southern FC (8 April 2017)
- Biggest away win: Southern FC 0-10 Beachside (17 June 2017)

The 2017 Southern Championship was the fourth edition of the Southern Championship as the second level domestic association football competition in Tasmania (third level overall in Australia). The league will consist of 9 teams, playing 16 matches.

Pos	Team	Pld	W	D	L	GF	GA	GD	Pts	Qualification or relegation
1	Glenorchy Knights (C)	16	13	2	1	66	11	+55	41	2017 League Cup
2	Beachside	16	11	1	4	34	27	+7	34	
3	University of Tasmania	16	11	0	5	58	16	+42	33	
4	Hobart United	16	9	3	4	38	23	+15	30	
5	Taroona	16	8	2	6	35	24	+11	26	
6	New Town Eagles	16	5	3	8	28	44	−16	18	
7	Metro FC	16	5	1	10	27	47	−20	16	
8	Southern FC	16	1	3	12	20	57	−37	6	
9	Nelson Eastern Suburbs	16	1	1	14	15	72	−57	4	

Source: sportstg.com
Rules for classification: 1) points; 2) goal difference; 3) number of goals scored.
(C) Champions

== Women's competitions ==
=== 2017 Women's Super League ===
Women's Super League
- Season: 2017
- Champions: Hobart Zebras

The 2017 Women's Super League season was the second edition of the statewide Tasmanian women's association football league. The league was played as a triple round-robin over 21 rounds.

Pos	Team	Pld	W	D	L	GF	GA	GD	Pts
1	Hobart Zebras (C)	21	20	1	0	87	14	+73	61
2	Launceston City	21	15	1	5	84	30	+54	46
3	Olympia	21	17	0	4	98	34	+64	51
4	Taroona	21	8	4	9	39	36	+3	28
5	Ulverstone	21	8	0	13	42	53	−11	24
6	Kingborough Lions United	21	4	3	14	23	88	−65	15
7	University of Tasmania	21	2	4	15	23	86	−63	10
8	Clarence United	21	2	3	16	12	61	−49	9

Source: sportstg.com
Rules for classification: 1) points; 2) goal difference; 3) number of goals scored.
(C) Champions

== Cup Competitions ==
Competition	Winners	Score	Runners-up
Milan Lakoseljac Cup	Olympia	4–2	Glenorchy Knights
Women's State Wide Cup	Hobart Zebras FC	1–0	Launceston City
State Wide Social Vase	Metro	4–0	University

The Milan Lakoseljac Cup competition also served as the Tasmanian Preliminary Rounds for the 2017 FFA Cup. Olympia entered at the Round of 32, where they were eliminated.
