= 2013 Lakoseljac Cup =

Tasmania Statewide Cup

Tournament details
- Country: Australia
- Teams: 20

Final positions
- Champions: Olympia
- Runners-up: Tilford Zebras

The 2013 Milan Lakoseljac Cup was a domestic soccer cup competition held in Tasmania which was held from March to June 2013. The tournament which was the 43rd edition of the Lakoseljac Cup featured twenty teams from three regional competitions in a knockout format with the Victory League teams plus four third division teams getting a first round bye.

In the final, it was won by Olympia who defeated Tilford Zebras 4–2 in the final to claim their fifth state title.

== First round ==
A total of 16 teams took part in this stage of the competition. All matches were completed by 11 March 2013.

The first-round outcomes were as follows:

Tie no	Home team (tier)	Score	Away team (tier)
1	Kingborough Lions (2)	2-4	Tilford Zebras (2)
2	Taroona (3)	3-1	Somerset (3)
3	Prospect Knights (3)	1-4	Glenorchy Knights (2)
4	Devonport City (2)	1-0	Northern Rangers (2)

Tie no	Home team (tier)	Score	Away team (tier)
5	University (3)	0-3	Olympia (2)
6	Ulverstone (3)	2-1	Clarence United (3)
7	Launceston City (2)	1-3	Riverside (3)

== Quarter finals ==
A total of 8 teams took part in this stage of the competition. All matches in this round were completed by 1 April 2013.

The quarter-final outcomes were as follows:

Tie no	Home team (tier)	Score	Away team (tier)
1	Olympia (2)	9–0	Riverside (3)
2	Ulverstone (3)	2–6	Taroona (3)
3	Tilford Zebras (2)	3–1	Devonport City (2)
4	Glenorchy Knights (2)	1–0	South Hobart (2)

== Semi finals ==
A total of 4 teams took part in this stage of the competition. All matches in this round were completed by May 5, 2013. The semi-final outcomes were as follows:

Tie no	Home team (tier)	Score	Away team (tier)
1	Tilford Zebras (2)	6–3	Taroona (2)
2	Olympia (2)	1–0	Glenorchy Knights (2)

== Final ==
The 2013 Lakoseljac Cup was held at the neutral venue of KGV Park on 10 June. Earlier in the day Clarence United FC won the Women's Cup, and South Hobart FC won the Under 20s Cup.

10 June 2013	Tilford Zebras	2 – 4	Olympia	KGV Park
4:00 PM	Aaron Cairns 26'; Alex Leszczynski 66'	Report:	Emmanuel Tsakiris 40', 57'; Hugh Undy 49', 85'	Attendance: 1,200
