= Tasmanian association football cup competitions =

Football Tasmania organises several annual Tasmanian association football (soccer) cups and tournaments alongside the regular league competitions that they also run. The first cup competition in Tasmania was the Falkinder Cup, which began in 1913. For nearly 60 years it was the state's premier football cup tournament but was eclipsed by the Statewide Cup and the pre-season Summer Cup. Various Cups and trophies have come and gone, and currently, the main non-league tournaments in Tasmania are the Statewide Cup (currently known as the Milan Lakoseljac Cup), and the three pre-season tournaments, the Summer Cup (south), the North West Summer Cup (North West), and the Steve Hudson Cup.

== Milan Lakoseljac Cup ==
Milan Lakoseljac Cup
- Founded: 1963
- Region: Tasmania
- Teams: 19 (in 2023)
- Current champions: Kingborough Lions (2026)
- Most championships: Glenorchy Knights (9 titles)
- Website: www.footballfedtas.com.au
- 2026 Australia Cup preliminary rounds

The male Statewide knock-out cup which is run annually with clubs from Northern and Southern Leagues is named the Milan Lakoseljac Cup (also known as the Statewide Cup). It was previously known as the Ampol Cup for sponsorship reasons between 1964 and 1976, before reverting to the Statewide Cup from 1977 to 1999. In 2000 the trophy was renamed in honour of Milan Lakoseljac (1947–1999), a former Glenorchy Knights (then known as Glenorchy Croatia) striker who died at the age of 52 in 1999. Milan was known as one of Tasmania's finest players of the era, and whilst representing Glenorchy Croatia he was the top goalscorer in Southern Tasmania in 1971, 1973, 1974, 1979 and 1981. He was also awarded the competition's best and fairest award in 1971 and 1973. During his time at Glenorchy, they won a Southern Championship and overall state championship double three times (1970, 1974 and 1975).

The competition is a knockout cup competition with matchups played over one leg. The competition consists of initial qualification rounds involving the teams from the lower divisions, with teams from higher divisions entering in later rounds. Clubs from all leagues within the Tasmanian league system are eligible to enter, although each club can only enter one team. Clubs are not separated geographically. Clubs are matched up based on the random draw involving clubs from all over the state.

Although they ran concurrently from 1963 to 1970 the Ampol Cup eclipsed its historical southern rival, the Falkinder Cup, and replaced it entirely in 1970 as Tasmania's premier knockout cup football competition. Since 2014, this knockout competition has been the qualification route for the single Tasmanian federation representative for the FFA Cup, now known as the Australia Cup.

=== List of Milan Lakoseljac Cup winners ===
Year	Winner	Runner up	Score
1963	Glenorchy Croatia	Olympia	1–0
1964	Olympia	Launceston Juventus	3–0
1965	Caledonians	Olympia	2–1
1966	Launceston Juventus	Hobart Rangers	2–0
1967	Hobart Juventus	Olympia	2–1
1968	Olympia	Glenorchy Croatia	2–1
1969	Glenorchy Croatia	Hobart Juventus	4–0
1970	Glenorchy Croatia	Metro Claremont	2–1
1971	Hobart Juventus	Metro Claremont	7–0
1972	Olympia	Launceston United	2–0
1973	Caledonians	GeorgeTown	3–1
1974	Rapid	Glenorchy Croatia	3–2
1975	Hobart Juventus	Olympia	2–2 (7–6 (p))
1976	Launceston Juventus	Hobart Juventus	1–0
1977	Devonport City	Launceston Juventus	1–0
1978	Glenorchy Croatia	Hobart Juventus	5–0
1979	Rapid	Glenorchy Croatia	2–1
1980	Rapid	Brighton Caledonians	2–1
1981	Brighton Caledonians	Hobart Juventus	2–1
1982	Ulverstone	Hobart Juventus	1–1; 3–2
1983	Hobart Juventus	Devonport City	3–0
1984	Rapid	Ulverstone	1–0; 1–0
1985–1986	Not Played		
1987	White Eagles	Hobart Juventus	2–1
1988	Hobart Olympia	Hobart Juventus	1–0
1989	White Eagles	Hobart Juventus	2–0
1990	Not Played		
1991	Launceston Juventus	Devonport City	3–1
1992–1993	Not Played		
1995	Hobart Olympia	Ulverstone	3–0
1996	White Eagles	Devonport City	2–1
1997	New Town Eagles	Launceston City	5–0
1998–1999	Not Played		
2000	Glenorchy Knights	Kingborough Lions	3–0
2001	Hobart Zebras	Glenorchy Knights	2–0
2002	Devonport City	Launceston City	4–3
2003	Hobart Zebras	Glenorchy Knights	0–0 (4–3 (p))
2004	Launceston City	University	2–0
2005	Glenorchy Knights	Launceston City	3–0
2006	University	Launceston City	1–0
2007	Launceston City	Somerset	2–0
2008	South Hobart	Devonport City	2–0
2009	Clarence United	Northern Rangers	2–0
2010	South Hobart	Clarence United	2–1
2011	South Hobart	Olympia	3–0
2012	Glenorchy Knights	New Town Eagles	3–2
2013	Olympia	Hobart Zebras	4–2
2014	South Hobart	Hobart Zebras	3–0
2015	South Hobart	Kingborough Lions	4–0
2016	Devonport City	South Hobart	1–0
2017	Olympia	Glenorchy Knights	4–2
2018	Devonport City	South Hobart	1–0
2019	South Hobart	Devonport City	2–0
2020	Glenorchy Knights	Olympia	2–1
2021	Devonport City	Glenorchy Knights	2–2 (4–3 (p))
2022	Devonport City	South Hobart	3–0
2023	Devonport City	South Hobart	1–0
2024	Glenorchy Knights	Kingborough Lions	3–2 (a.e.t.)
2025	South East United	South Hobart	2–3
2026	Kingborough Lions	Devonport City	1–1 (5–3 (p))

=== Overall honours ===
Team	Winners	Runners up	Years
Glenorchy Knights	9	5	1963, 1969, 1970, 1978, 2000, 2005, 2012, 2020, 2024
Olympia	7	6	1964, 1968, 1972, 1995, 1988, 2013, 2017
Devonport City	7	4	1977, 2002, 2016, 2018, 2021, 2022, 2023
Hobart Zebras	6	10	1967, 1971, 1975, 1983, 2001, 2003
South Hobart	6	4	2008, 2010, 2011, 2014, 2015, 2019, 2025
Launceston City	5	5	1966, 1976, 1991, 2004, 2007
New Town Eagles	4	1	1987, 1989, 1996, 1997
Rapid	4	–	1974, 1979, 1980, 1984
Caledonians/Kingborough Lions	3	3	1965, 1973, 2026

== Pre-season cups ==
Three regional cup competitions are played each year in the pre-season prior to the regular league season commencing.

=== Summer Cup (Southern) ===
The Summer Cup is a pre-season knock-out tournament mainly for the southern clubs.

Year	Champion	Runner up	Score
1971	Hobart Juventus	South Hobart	3–0
1972	Hobart Juventus	Caledonians	1–0
1973	Hobart Juventus	Croatia Glenorchy	3–1
1974	White Eagles	league format	
1975	Hobart Olympia	Caledonians	4–3
1976	White Eagles	Hobart Juventus	2–1
1977	White Eagles	Metro Claremont	3–0
1978	Hobart Juventus	White Eagles	1–0
1979	Croatia Glenorchy	Caledonians	3–1
1980	Brighton Caledonians	White Eagles	2–1
1981	Hobart Juventus	not known	
1982	Croatia Glenorchy	Hobart Juventus	3–1
1983	Croatia Glenorchy	Hobart Olympia	4–2
1984	Hobart Juventus	Rapid	2–1
1985	Caledonians	Hobart Juventus	3–2
1986	Hobart Juventus	White Eagles	2–1
1987	Hobart Juventus	Hobart Olympia	1–0
1988	Hobart Juventus	White Eagles	5–0
1989	Hobart Juventus	White Eagles	2–1
1990	White Eagles	Hobart Juventus	5–1
1991	White Eagles	Hobart Juventus	4–2
1992	White Eagles	Hobart Juventus	3–2
1993	Croatia Glenorchy	White Eagles	2–1

Year	Champion	Runner up	Score
1994	White Eagles	Croatia Glenorchy	7–3
1995	Metro Claremont	Kingborough United	4–1
1996	New Town Eagles	Hobart Juventus	6–4
1997	New Town Eagles	South Hobart	2–1
1998	Hobart Olympic	South Hobart	2–1
1999	Hobart Olympic	New Town Eagles	3–2
2000	New Town Eagles	Glenorchy Knights	2–1
2001	South Hobart	New Town Eagles	3–2
2002	University	New Town Eagles	4–1
2003	Glenorchy Knights	South Hobart	1–0
2004	South Hobart	Glenorchy Knights	2–1
2005	Hobart Olympic	Glenorchy Knights	1–1 (7–6 (p))
2006	University	New Town Eagles	2–0
2007	Hobart Zebras FC	New Town Eagles	5–0
2008	Hobart Zebras FC	South Hobart	3–2
2009	Hobart Zebras FC	Clarence United	4–3
2010	South Hobart	Glenorchy Knights	4–0
2011	South Hobart	Hobart Zebras	4–0
2012	Kingborough Lions	Hobart Zebras	2–0
2013	Olympia Warriors	Taroona FC	2–1
2014	Olympia Warriors	Hobart Zebras	2–1
2015	Olympia Warriors	Hobart Zebras	4–0
2016	South Hobart	Kingborough Lions	3–2
2019	Beachside FC	Hobart United	3–2

References :

=== Summer Cup (North West) ===
Year	Champion	Runner up	Score
2001	Devonport City	Burnie United	1–0
2002	Devonport City	Somerset	5–0
2003	Devonport City	Burnie United	3–2
2004	Devonport City	Somerset	1–0
2005	Devonport City	Somerset	2–1
2006	Somerset	Burnie United	3–1
2007			
2008	Devonport City	Somerset	3–2

Year	Champion	Runner up	Score
2009	Somerset	Devonport City	3–0
2010	Devonport City	Somerset	5–1
2011	Devonport City	Burnie United	5–2
2012	Devonport City	league format	
2013	Ulverstone FC	Devonport City	5–0
2014			
2015			

References :

=== Steve Hudson Cup ===
This Cup is named for Stephen Geoffrey Hudson, who died on 26 November 1979 as a result of injury suffered whilst playing for the Launceston United Soccer Club. In past years entries were received from both North and North West soccer Clubs; however in latter years entries have mainly been only from Launceston-based clubs, with the occasional Southern team participating.

Year	Champion
1980	Devonport United
1981	GeorgeTown United
1982	Devonport City
1983	Ulverstone
1984	Devonport City
1985	GeorgeTown United
1986	GeorgeTown United
1987	Launceston Juventus
1988	GeorgeTown United
1989	Launceston Juventus
1990	Ulverstone
1991	Launceston Juventus
1992	Devonport City
1993	Launceston Juventus
1994	Burnie United
1995	Launceston
1996	Launceston Juventus
1997	Devonport City

Year	Champion
1998	Devonport City
1999	Glenorchy Knights
2000	Glenorchy Knights
2001	Hobart Zebras
2002	Launceston City
2003	Glenorchy Knights
2004	Launceston City
2005	Launceston City
2006	Northern Rangers
2007	Launceston City
2008	South Hobart
2009	South Hobart
2010	South Hobart
2011	South Hobart
2012	South Hobart
2013	Devonport City
2014	Northern Rangers
2015	Launceston United SC

References :

== Former competitions ==
=== Falkinder Cup ===
The Falkinder Cup was the South's premier football cup competition from 1913 until 1970. This tournament was eclipsed by the Statewide Cup, and in the early 1970s was incorporated into the pre-season Summer Cup, and was abandoned after running for 70 years.

Year	Champion	Runner up	Score
1913	Corinthians	not known	
1914	Corinthians	not known	
1915–1918	No competition due to World War 1		
1919	South Hobart	not known	
1920	Corinthians	Hobart	2–2; 5–1
1921	South Hobart	Hobart	not known
1922	Cadburys FC	South Hobart	1–0
1923	Sandy Bay	Hobart	3–1
1924	South Hobart	Corinthians	2–2; 2–0
1925	Sandy Bay	South Hobart	2–2; 1–0
1926	Sandy Bay	South Hobart	1–0
1927	Sandy Bay	Hobart Athletic	1–0
1928	South Hobart	Hobart Athletic	3–2
1929	Hobart Athletic	Sandy Bay	3–2
1930	Hobart Athletic	Sandy Bay	3–2
1931	Sandy Bay	South Hobart	1–0
1932	Cascades FC	Navy Athletic	1–0
1933	Sandy Bay	Cascades FC	not known
1934	Cascades FC	Sandy Bay	4–3
1935	Sandy Bay	South Hobart	5–1
1936	Sandy Bay	South Hobart	2–2; 5–1
1937	Sandy Bay	South Hobart	5–5; 8–3
1938	Sandy Bay	West End United	5–2
1939	Sandy Bay	West End United	7–0
1940–1945	No competition due to World War 2		
1946	South Hobart	Sandy Bay	4–3

Year	Champion	Runner up	Score
1947	Metro Claremont	South Hobart	2–1
1948	South Hobart	Hobart United	1–0
1949	Wanderers	Metro Claremont	3–1
1950	Wanderers	Metro Claremont	3–3; 1–0
1951	Caledonians	Titan FC	1–0
1952	Caledonians	Wanderers	2–1
1953	Caledonians	Metro Claremont	2–0
1954	Caledonians	Wanderers	2–2; 5–2
1955	Caledonians	Metro Claremont	4–3
1956	Caledonians	South Hobart	5–0
1957	Caledonians	Metro Claremont	5–0
1958	Caledonians	Rapid	2–1
1959	Caledonians	South Hobart	9–4
1960	Hobart Rangers	Caledonians	1–0
1961	Caledonians	University	8–3
1962	Caledonians	Glenorchy Croatia	3–2
1963	Hobart Olympia	Hobart Juventus	6–1
1964	Glenorchy Croatia	Caledonians	3–0
1965	Caledonians	Hobart Olympia	3–0
1966	Hobart Olympia	Hobart Juventus	4–1
1967	Hobart Olympia	Hobart Juventus	5–0
1968	White Eagles	Glenorchy Croatia	5–1
1969	Rapid	White Eagles	4–2
1970	Hobart Juventus	Glenorchy Croatia	7–2
1971	Awarded to Hobart Juventus as winners of the Summer Cup		
1972	Awarded to Hobart Juventus as winners of the Summer Cup		
1973	Awarded to Hobart Juventus as winners of the Summer Cup		

=== Association Cup ===
The Association Cup was another knockout Cup for southern football teams, commencing in 1960. Similar to the Falkinder Cup, in the early 1970s was incorporated into the pre-season Summer Cup.

Year	Champion	Runner up	Score
1960	Caledonians	South Hobart	5–3
1961	Rapid	Olympia	2–0
1962	Caledonians	Glenorchy Croatia	3–2
1963	Hobart Rangers	Glenorchy Croatia	1–0
1964	Caledonians	Glenorchy Croatia	3–2
1965	Rapid	Olympia	4–4 (Note: Rapid won on coin toss)
1966	Olympia	Glenorchy Croatia	4–2

Year	Champion	Runner up	Score
1967	Olympia	Caledonians	3–0
1968	White Eagles	Glenorchy Croatia	1–0
1969	Rapid	Hobart Juventus	4–2
1970	Hobart Juventus	Glenorchy Croatia	7–2
1971	Awarded to Hobart Juventus as winners of the Summer Cup		
1972	Awarded to Hobart Juventus as winners of the Summer Cup		
1973	Awarded to Hobart Juventus as winners of the Summer Cup		

=== Lloyd Triestino Cup ===
The Lloyd Triestino Cup was an end of season tournament, initially sponsored by the eponymous Italian shipping company, and from 1976 onwards known as the DJ Trophy.

Year	Champion	Runner up	Score
1973	Glenorchy Croatia	Hobart Olympia	3–1
1974	Hobart Juventus	Hobart Olympia	3–2
1975	Hobart Olympia	South Hobart	5–3
1976	White Eagles	Hobart Juventus	2–1
1977	Rapid	Hobart Olympia	5–0

=== Cadbury Trophy ===
Year	Winner	Runner up	Score
1978	Glenorchy Croatia	White Eagles	3–1
1979	Launceston Juventus	Rapid	0–0 (5–4 (p))
1980	Brighton Caledonians	Rapid	2–2 (5–3 (p))
1981	Georgetown United	Launceston Croatia	4–1
1982	Rapid	Hobart Juventus	4–0
1983	Rapid	Hobart Juventus	3–1
1984	Hobart Juventus	Rapid	3–0
1985	Glenorchy Croatia	Hobart Juventus	3–0
1986	Olympia	White Eagles	drawn; (5–4 (p))

Year	Winner	Runner up	Score
1987	Hobart Juventus	Olympia	2–0
1988	White Eagles	Olympia	2–1
1989	Hobart Juventus	White Eagles	2–1
1990	Hobart Juventus	Olympia	1–0
1991	Hobart Juventus	Olympia	4–2
1992	Glenorchy Croatia	White Eagles	2–1
1993	Hobart Juventus	White Eagles	4–1
1994	White Eagles	University	3–1
