= 2014 Football Federation Tasmania season =

Football Federation Tasmania
- Season: 2014
- Champions: South Hobart

The Football Federation Tasmania 2014 season was the second season under the new competition format in Tasmania. The competition consists of three major divisions across the State of Tasmania, created from the teams in the previous structure. The overall champion for the new structure qualified for the National Premier Leagues finals series, competing with the other state federation champions in a final knockout tournament to decide the National Premier Leagues Champion for 2014.

== Men's Competitions ==
=== 2014 NPL Tasmania ===
Victory League
- Season: 2014
- Champions: South Hobart
- Matches: 84
- Goals: 395 (4.7 per match)
- Top goalscorer: Brayden Mann (31 goals)
- Biggest home win: Hobart Zebras 12–0 Launceston City (28 June 2014)
- Biggest away win: Kingborough Lions United 0-8 Northern Rangers (28 June 2013); Launceston City 0-8 South Hobart (12 July 2014)
- Highest scoring: Hobart Zebras 12–0 Launceston City (28 June 2014)

The 2014 T-League season was played over 21 rounds, from March to August 2014.

Pos	Team	Pld	W	D	L	GF	GA	GD	Pts	Qualification or relegation
1	South Hobart (C)	21	18	1	2	89	18	+71	55	2014 National Premier Leagues Finals
2	Hobart Zebras	21	15	2	4	63	20	+43	47	2014 Tasmania Finals
3	Olympia	21	13	2	6	51	34	+17	41	2014 Tasmania Finals
4	Northern Rangers	21	11	3	7	51	38	+13	36	2014 Tasmania Finals
5	Devonport City	21	9	2	10	49	49	0	29	
6	Kingborough Lions United	21	5	1	15	35	84	−49	16	
7	Glenorchy Knights	21	3	2	16	28	66	−38	11	
8	Launceston City	21	3	1	17	29	86	−57	10	

Source: foxsportspulse.com
Rules for classification: 1) points; 2) goal difference; 3) number of goals scored.
(C) Champions

==== Finals ====
The top 4 teams play a knock-out finals series called the Victory Cup, where the semi-final match-ups were randomly drawn.

Semi-finals
1	South Hobart	3
2	Hobart Zebras	1
3	Olympia	1
4	Northern Rangers	3

Grand Final
1	South Hobart	3
4	Northern Rangers	1

=== 2014 Tasmanian Premier Leagues ===
==== 2014 Northern Premier League ====
Northern Premier League
- Season: 2014
- Matches: 72
- Goals: 342 (4.75 per match)
- Top goalscorer: Kyrone Johnson (26 goals)
- Biggest home win: Somerset 12–1 Launceston City B (17 May 2014); Somerset 11–0 Launceston United (9 August 2014)
- Biggest away win: Prospect Knights 0–9 Somerset (14 June 2014)
- Highest scoring: Somerset 12–1 Launceston City B (17 May 2014)

The 2014 Northern Premier League was the second edition of the new Northern Premier League as the second level domestic association football competition in Tasmania (third level overall in Australia). 9 teams competed, all playing each other twice for a total of 18 rounds. No teams were promoted or relegated this season.

Pos	Team	Pld	W	D	L	GF	GA	GD	Pts	Qualification or relegation
1	Somerset (C)	16	14	1	1	93	10	+83	43	2014 Northern Premier League Finals
2	Riverside Olympic	16	13	3	0	53	16	+37	42	2014 Northern Premier League Finals
3	Devonport City B	16	9	2	5	49	40	+9	29	2014 Northern Premier League Finals
4	Northern Rangers B	16	6	4	6	40	37	+3	22	2014 Northern Premier League Finals
5	Prospect Knights	16	6	2	8	26	44	−18	20	Withdrew at end of season
6	Burnie United	16	6	0	10	21	37	−16	18	
7	Ulverstone	16	4	2	10	23	33	−10	14	
8	Launceston United	16	3	2	11	21	63	−42	11	
9	Launceston City B	16	2	2	12	16	62	−46	8	

(C) Champions

===== Finals =====
Semi-finals
1	Somerset	6
4	Northern Rangers	2
2	Riverside Olympic	5
3	Devonport City	2

Grand Final
1	Somerset	4
2	Riverside Olympic	0

==== 2014 Southern Premier League ====
Southern Premier League
- Season: 2014
- Matches: 60
- Goals: 287 (4.78 per match)
- Top goalscorer: Luke Huigsloot (27 goals)
- Biggest home win: University of Tasmania 12–3 New Town Eagles (26 April 2014)
- Biggest away win: Nelson Eastern Suburbs 0–10 Taroona (26 April 2014)
- Highest scoring: University of Tasmania 12–3 New Town Eagles (26 April 2014)

The 2014 Southern Premier League was the second edition of the new Southern Premier League as the second level domestic association football competition in Tasmania (third level overall in Australia). 6 teams competed, all playing each other four times for a total of 20 rounds. No teams were promoted or relegated this season.

Pos	Team	Pld	W	D	L	GF	GA	GD	Pts	Qualification or relegation
1	University of Tasmania (C)	20	16	3	1	77	27	+50	51	2014 Southern Premier League Finals
2	Clarence United	20	12	2	6	67	21	+46	38	2014 Southern Premier League Finals
3	Taroona	20	11	4	5	50	29	+21	37	2014 Southern Premier League Finals
4	Beachside	20	9	5	6	55	41	+14	32	2014 Southern Premier League Finals
5	Nelson Eastern Suburbs	20	3	2	15	18	74	−56	11	
6	New Town Eagles	20	1	0	19	20	95	−75	3	

(C) Champions

===== Finals =====
Semi-finals
1	University of Tasmania	5
4	Beachside	1
2	Clarence United	3
3	Taroona	1

Grand Final
1	University of Tasmania	3
2	Clarence United	1

=== 2014 Tasmanian League One ===
==== 2014 Northern League One ====
Northern League One
- Season: 2014
- Matches: 72
- Goals: 417 (5.79 per match)

The 2014 Northern League One was the second edition of the new Tasmanian League One as the third level domestic association football competition in Tasmania (fourth level overall in Australia). 9 teams competed, all playing each other twice for a total of 16 matches. No teams were promoted or relegated this season, although Prospect Knights withdrew.

Pos	Team	Pld	W	D	L	GF	GA	GD	Pts	Qualification or relegation
1	Devonport City C (C)	16	14	1	1	89	32	+57	43	
2	Launceston City C	16	13	0	3	71	21	+50	39	
3	Somerset B	16	10	1	5	63	34	+29	31	
4	Northern Rangers C	16	10	1	5	48	38	+10	31	
5	Ulverstone B	16	7	1	8	44	50	−6	22	
6	Riverside Olympic B	16	5	4	7	33	36	−3	19	
7	Burnie United B	16	3	3	10	33	56	−23	12	
8	Prospect Knights B	16	3	1	12	24	75	−51	10	Withdrew at end of season
9	Launceston United B	16	1	0	15	12	75	−63	3	

(C) Champions

==== 2014 Southern League One ====
Southern League One
- Season: 2014
- Matches: 40
- Goals: 217 (5.43 per match)

The 2014 Southern League One was the second edition of the new Tasmanian League One as the third level domestic association football competition in Tasmania (fourth level overall in Australia). 5 teams competed, all playing each other four times for a total of 16 matches. At the end of the season, three teams were promoted as the competition was restructured.

Pos	Team	Pld	W	D	L	GF	GA	GD	Pts	Qualification or relegation
1	Metro FC (P)	16	10	2	4	57	32	+25	32	Promoted to the 2015 Southern Championship
2	Southern FC (P)	16	9	2	5	47	38	+9	29	Promoted to the 2015 Southern Championship
3	Olympia B	16	7	4	5	33	35	−2	25	
4	Kingborough Lions United B	16	5	0	11	37	53	−16	15	
5	Hobart United (P)	16	3	4	9	43	59	−16	13	Promoted to the 2015 Southern Championship

(P) Promoted

=== 2014 Tasmanian League Two ===
==== 2014 Northern League Two ====
Northern League Two
- Season: 2014
- Matches: 58
- Goals: 335 (5.78 per match)

The 2014 Northern League Two was the second edition of the new Tasmanian League Two as the fourth level domestic association football competition in Tasmania (fifth level overall in Australia). 6 teams competed, all playing each other four times for a total of 20 matches. No teams were promoted or relegated this season.

Pos	Team	Pld	W	D	L	GF	GA	GD	Pts
1	Launceston City D (C)	19	14	1	4	81	33	+48	43
2	Devonport City D	19	11	3	5	64	34	+30	36
3	Northern Rangers D	20	11	1	8	55	36	+19	34
4	Riverside Olympic C	19	7	1	11	49	53	−4	22
5	Launceston City X Factor	19	6	2	11	47	61	−14	20
6	Launceston United C	20	5	0	15	39	109	−70	15

(C) Champions

^{NB}Two matches were postponed and subsequently could not be played.

==== 2014 Southern League Two ====
Southern League Two
- Season: 2014
- Matches: 59
- Goals: 326 (5.53 per match)

The 2014 Southern League Two was the second edition of the new Tasmanian League Two as the fourth level domestic association football competition in Tasmania (fifth level overall in Australia). 6 teams competed, all playing each other four times for a total of 20 matches. No teams were promoted or relegated this season.

Pos	Team	Pld	W	D	L	GF	GA	GD	Pts
1	Metro B (C)	20	18	1	1	81	23	+58	55
2	Uni Laterals	19	12	2	5	59	34	+25	38
3	University of Tasmania B	20	9	2	9	57	46	+11	29
4	South Hobart B	19	7	2	10	49	58	−9	23
5	Hobart United B	20	7	1	12	52	46	+6	22
6	Southern FC B	20	2	0	18	28	113	−85	6

(C) Champions

^{NB}One match was postponed and subsequently could not be played.

=== 2014 Tasmanian League Three ===
==== 2014 Southern League Three ====
Southern League Three
- Season: 2014
- Matches: 92
- Goals: 467 (5.08 per match)

The 2014 Southern League Three was the second edition of the new Tasmanian League Three as the fifth level domestic association football competition in Tasmania (sixth level overall in Australia). 12 teams competed, all playing each other twice during a total of 22 rounds. Two teams withdrew during the season and several matches were washed out, leaving the teams with an uneven number of matches played.

Pos	Team	Pld	W	D	L	GF	GA	GD	Pts	Qualification or relegation
1	Kingborough Blue (C)	18	14	4	0	68	21	+47	46 (Note: Kingsborough Blue are listed on the ladder with three draws, however are listed with four draws on the results page.)	
2	Phoenix Rovers	19	12	5	2	62	21	+41	41	
3	Beachside B	17	11	1	5	53	24	+29	34	
4	University of Tasmania C	19	9	3	7	58	34	+24	30	
5	Clarence United B	17	8	6	3	62	43	+19	30	
6	Taroona C	18	9	2	7	42	32	+10	29	
7	Glenorchy Knights C	16	7	0	9	36	48	−12	21	
8	Beach Originals	18	3	3	12	41	45	−4	12	
9	Clarence Red	17	2	0	15	25	99	−74	6	
10	Kingborough Lions United C	17	1	1	15	24	67	−43	4	
11	Metro C	7	3	0	4	14	17	−3	0	Withdrew during season
12	Barnstoneworth	1	0	0	1	0	7	−7	0	Withdrew during season

(C) Champions

=== 2014 Tasmanian League Four ===
==== 2014 Southern League Four ====
Southern League Four
- Season: 2014
- Matches: 121
- Goals: 668 (5.52 per match)

The 2014 Southern League Four was the second edition of the new Tasmanian League Four as the sixth level domestic association football competition in Tasmania (seventh level overall in Australia). 11 teams competed, all playing a total of 22 matches. No teams were promoted or relegated this season.

Pos	Team	Pld	W	D	L	GF	GA	GD	Pts
1	Huon Valley (C)	22	18	2	2	128	25	+103	56
2	Derwent United	22	17	1	4	115	31	+84	52
3	Metro D	22	13	2	7	58	46	+12	41
4	South Hobart C	22	12	3	7	67	49	+18	39
5	Barnstoneworth Golden Gordons	22	12	2	8	68	46	+22	38
6	University of Tasmania D	22	7	7	8	42	60	−18	28
7	Barnstoneworth Scrappers	22	7	6	9	39	48	−9	27
8	Cygnet Town	21	7	3	11	43	59	−16	24
9	New Norfolk	22	6	3	13	54	91	−37	21
10	Peninsula Pirates	22	3	2	17	34	84	−50	11
11	DOSA SC	22	0	3	19	20	130	−110	3

(C) Champions

^{NB}This ladder lists three more losses than wins and one more goal conceded than scored, as well as Cygnet Town having an odd number of matches played.

== Women's Competitions ==
=== 2014 Northern Premier League ===
Northern Women's Premier League
- Season: 2014
- Champions: Ulverstone
- Premiers: Ulverstone

Pos	Team	Pld	W	D	L	GF	GA	GD	Pts	Qualification or relegation
1	Ulverstone (C)	18	17	0	1	150	21	+129	51	2014 Statewide Finals series
2	Launceston City	17	15	1	1	135	8	+127	46	2014 Statewide Finals series
3	Prospect Knights	18	11	2	5	96	33	+63	35	
4	Riverside Olympic	18	10	3	5	68	39	+29	33	
5	Launceston United	17	8	1	8	60	52	+8	25	
6	Devonport	18	7	4	7	79	75	+4	25	
7	Northern Rangers	18	6	0	12	49	67	−18	18	
8	Somerset	18	5	1	12	42	107	−65	16	
9	Launceston City Allies	18	3	2	13	26	105	−79	11	
10	Burnie United	18	0	0	18	26	189	−163	0	

Source: sportstg.com
Rules for classification: 1) points; 2) goal difference; 3) number of goals scored.
(C) Champions

=== 2014 Southern Premier League ===
Southern Women's Premier League
- Season: 2014
- Premiers: Olympia Warriors

Pos	Team	Pld	W	D	L	GF	GA	GD	Pts	Qualification or relegation
1	Olympia	20	17	3	0	106	26	+80	54	2014 Statewide Finals series
2	Tilford Zebras	20	10	3	7	48	45	+3	33	2014 Statewide Finals series
3	University of Tasmania	20	7	4	9	48	53	−5	25	
4	Clarence United	20	5	6	9	24	32	−8	21	
5	Taroona	20	6	3	11	32	58	−26	21	
6	Glenorchy Knights	20	4	3	13	40	81	−41	15	

Source: sportstg.com
Rules for classification: 1) points; 2) goal difference; 3) number of goals scored.

=== 2014 Statewide Finals series ===
Semifinals
S1	Olympia Warriors	4
N2	Launceston City	1
N1	Ulverstone	6
S2	Tilford Zebras	5

Finals
S1	Olympia Warriors	2
N1	Ulverstone	3

== Cup Competitions ==
Competition	Winners	Score	Runners-up
Milan Lakoseljac Cup	Hobart Zebras	0–3	South Hobart
Women's State Wide Cup	Olympia	6–0	Ulverstone
State Wide Social Vase	Metro	3–2	Olympia

The Milan Lakoseljac Cup competition also served as the Tasmanian Preliminary rounds for the 2014 FFA Cup. South Hobart entered at the Round of 32, where they were eliminated.
