= Ken Worden =

Australian footballer and coach (1943–2021)

Personal information
- Full name: Kenneth Joseph Worden
- Date of birth: 2 February 1943
- Place of birth: Preston, Lancashire, England
- Date of death: 20 September 2021 (aged 78)
- Place of death: Townsville Palliative Care, Queensland, Australia
- Positions: Striker; defender

Senior career*
Years	Team	Apps	(Gls)
- Burnley
- Preston North End
1971–1973	Weston Bears		
1974	Hobart Juventus		
1978	Hobart Olympia		
1980	White Eagles		
1981	Launceston Juventus		
1982	Townsville Kern United		

Managerial career
- 1974: Hobart Juventus
- 1978: Hobart Olympia
- 1980: White Eagles
- 1981: Launceston Juventus
- 1982: Townsville Kern United
- 1987–1988: Floreat Athena
- 1990–1991: Melbourne Croatia
- 1991: Selangor
- 1992–1993: Malaysia
- 1994: Singapore/Singapore Lions
- 1994–1996: Selangor
- 1997–1998: Melbourne Knights
- 1999: Sabah
- 2002–2004: Selangor
- 2009: Terengganu
- 2010–2013: Southern Myanmar
- 2015: KL SPA
- * Club domestic league appearances and goals

Kenneth Joseph Worden (2 February 1943 – 20 September 2021) was a British-born Australian football player and coach.

Worden was born on 2 February 1943, in Preston, Lancashire, England.

Worden was more successful in Australia as player and coach, notably as head coach at national level with Melbourne Croatia, where he guided the club to a runners-up place in the 1990–91 season, losing the grand final to local rivals South Melbourne.

Worden also coached at Southeast Asia, coaching clubs in Malaysia and Myanmar, and also had stints as head coach of national teams of Malaysia and Singapore.

Worden died on 20 September 2021 in Australia, at age 78.
