= David Clarkson (Australian soccer) =

Australian soccer player

Personal information
- Full name: David James Clarkson
- Date of birth: 1 February 1968 (age 58)
- Position: Midfielder

Youth career
- Rapid
- Hobart Juventus
- Australian Institute of Sport

Senior career*
Years	Team	Apps	(Gls)
1988	Brisbane Lions	18	(0)
1989	Adelaide City	3	(0)
1989–1991	Sunshine George Cross	39	(8)
1991–1992	Brighton & Hove Albion	13	(0)
1992–1993	Heidelberg United	22	(2)
1993	Happy Valley		
1994	Sing Tao		
1994–1995	South China		
1996–2003	South Melbourne	137	(6)
- * Club domestic league appearances and goals

David Clarkson (born 1 February 1968) is an Australian soccer player who spent 12 years in the Australian National Soccer League (NSL). He also played in England, making 13 appearances for Brighton & Hove Albion in the Football League Second Division. He also spent three years in Hong Kong.

== Early life ==
Clarkson was born in England before emigrating to Australia with his family at a young age. His father, Brian, was a referee.

== Playing career ==
Clarkson began his career in Tasmania, playing for Rapid and Hobart Juventus before moving to the mainland.
