= Southern Premier League =

Southern Premier League may refer to:

== Association football ==
- Southern Football League, premier division, in England
- Southern Championship, formerly known as the Southern Premier League, in Tasmania, Australia
- Southern Premier League (New Zealand), formerly known as the FootballSouth Premier League, in southern New Zealand

== Other sports ==
- Southern Premier Cricket League, in England
