= Tasmanian soccer championship =

Soccer competition in Tasmania, Australia

- Sport: Soccer
- Founded: 1910
- Country: Australia
- Most recent champion: Clarence

The Tasmanian soccer championship describes the method of determining the best soccer club in Tasmania, Australia. The championship has been decided using three different formats; a statewide league, a playoff between Northern and Southern league Champions and lastly a statewide finals system with top teams from Northern and Southern leagues.

== Formats ==
=== Tasmanian Statewide League ===
The Tasmanian Statewide League was the highest state-level competition in Tasmania prior to being disbanded in 2000. Nationally, it was on par with Australia's other state leagues, below the National Soccer League. It was administered by Soccer Tasmania, now known as Football Tasmania, the state's governing body.

The State League began in 1978, and replaced the former system of northern champions playing off against southern champions which had continued since 1910. The league was briefly suspended from 1982 until 1987, but then resumed for the next 12 years.

=== Resumption of Championship Playoff ===
In 2000, the State League ended, and the Southern and Northern Premier Leagues became the state's highest level of soccer competition. The state championship format reverted to two regional leagues determining a Southern and Northern champion, who then, at the end of the regular season, play-off for the state championship.

=== Statewide Finals System ===
In 2009 the series changed to an eight team knock out series played over three weeks involving the top four teams from each of the Northern and Southern Premier League.

=== NPL Tasmania ===
A new eight-team statewide league, known as the NPL Tasmania, commenced in 2013. The league forms a conference within the National Premier Leagues (NPL). The NPL Tasmania Champion enters a national play-off series at the conclusion of the regular season against the champions of other NPL conferences.

In 2012 Football Federation Tasmania announced a partnership with Melbourne Victory, with the competition being branded the Victory League between 2012 and 2015. Since 2016 the league has been known as NPL Tasmania to conform with the branding of the other divisions in the National Premier Leagues.

== Honours ==
| Year | Winner | Score | Runner-up |
|---|---|---|---|
| 1910 | Hobart Athletic | | |
| 1911 | Westralia | | |
| 1912 | St. George | | Tamar |
| 1913 | Corinthians | | Tamar |
| 1914 | Corinthians | | Tamar |
| 1915–1918 | No competition due to World War I | | |
| 1919 | South Hobart | | Elphin |
| 1920 | South Hobart | | Elphin |
| 1921 | South Hobart | | Tamar |
| 1922 | South Hobart | 5–1 | North Esk |
| 1923 | South Hobart | 4–2 | Elphin |
| 1924 | Sandy Bay | 6–1 | Elphin |
| 1925 | Sandy Bay | 2–0 | Patons & Baldwins |
| 1926 | Patons & Baldwins | 2–1 | South Hobart |
| 1927 | Sandy Bay | 2–1 | Elphin |
| 1928 | Hobart Athletic | 5–0 | Elphin |
| 1929 | South Hobart | 2–1 | Invermay |
| 1930 | Patons & Baldwins | 3–0 | Hobart Athletic |
| 1931 | Cascades | 2–1 | Tamar |
| 1932 | Cascades | 8–3 | Tamar |
| 1933 | Sandy Bay | 3–0 | Tamar |
| 1934 | Cascades | 9–3 | Tamar |
| 1935 | Cascades | 8–1 | Thistle |
| 1936 | Sandy Bay | 1–0 | Patons & Baldwins |
| 1937 | South Hobart | | Invermay |
| 1938 | Sandy Bay | | Invermay |
| 1939 | Sandy Bay | 3–3 (Note: Sandy Bay retain as previous holders) | Patons & Baldwins |
| 1940–1945 | No competition due to World War II | | |
| 1946 | South Hobart | 4–2 | Invermay |
| 1947 | South Hobart | 5–0 | Invermay |
| 1948 | South Hobart | 1–0 | Invermay |
| 1949 | Invermay | 5–4 | Metro |
| 1950 | Metro | 6–1 | Invermay |
| 1951 | Metro | 2–1 | Invermay |
| 1952 | Metro | 2–1 | Patons & Baldwins |
| 1953 | Caledonians | 3–1 | South Launceston |
| 1954 | Metro | 3–2 | Patons & Baldwins |
| 1955 | Caledonians | 7–2 | Papermakers |
| 1956 | Caledonians | 6–1 | Burnie Celtic |
| 1957 | Caledonians | 6–0 | APPM |
| 1958 | Caledonians | 3–1 | Patons & Baldwins |
| 1959 | South Hobart | 3–2 | Launceston Juventus |
| 1960 | Caledonians | 6–1 | Launceston Juventus |
| 1961 | Launceston Juventus | 2–1 | Rapid |
| 1962 | Hobart Rangers | 7–0 | Burnie Rovers |
| 1963 | Launceston Juventus | 4–2 | Ulverstone |
| 1964 | Rapid | 6–1 | Launceston United |
| 1965 | Hobart Olympia | 3–3 (Note: Hobart Olympia won based on corner kicks (4–3)) | Launceston Juventus |

| Year | Winner | Score | Runner-up |
|---|---|---|---|
| 1966 | Hobart Olympia | 3–1 | Launceston Juventus |
| 1967 | Launceston United SC | 3–0 | Ulverstone SC |
| 1968 | Hobart Olympia | 3–1 | Launceston Juventus |
| 1969 | Hobart Juventus | 2–4, 4–1 | Launceston Juventus |
| 1970 | Glenorchy Croatia | 4–1, 3–1 | Georgetown |
| 1971 | Hobart Juventus | 6–2, 6–1 | Launceston Juventus |
| 1972 | Hobart Juventus | 2–3, 3–0 | Launceston Juventus |
| 1973 | Hobart Juventus | 8–1, 5–4 | Riverside Olympic |
| 1974 | Glenorchy Croatia | 3–0, 2–1 | Devonport City |
| 1975 | Glenorchy Croatia | 1–1, 4–2 | Launceston Juventus |
| 1976 | Rapid | 3–2, 3–4 (6–5(p)) | Launceston Juventus |
| 1977 | White Eagle | 2–2, 2–1 | Devonport City |
| 1978 | White Eagle (Note: League Premiers - no finals series) | | – |
| 1979 | Rapid | | – |
| 1980 | Rapid | | – |
| 1981 | Brighton Caledonians | | – |
| 1982 | Rapid | 1–1, 2–0 | Devonport City |
| 1983 | Hobart Juventus | 3–0 | Devonport City |
| 1984 | Hobart Juventus | 1–0, 2–0 | Georgetown |
| 1985 | Hobart Juventus | 1–1, 3–0 | Georgetown |
| 1986 | Ulverstone | 2–0, 0–1 | White Eagle |
| 1987 | Hobart Olympia | 3–1, 2–2 | Ulverstone |
| 1988 | White Eagle | | – |
| 1989 | White Eagle | | – |
| 1990 | White Eagle | | – |
| 1991 | White Eagle | | – |
| 1992 | Glenorchy Croatia | 2–0 | Devonport City |
| 1993 | Hobart Juventus | 2–1 | Devonport City |
| 1994 | Devonport City | 3–2 | White Eagle |
| 1995 | White Eagle | 3–0 | Launceston Juventus |
| 1996 | Hobart Olympia | 2–1 | White Eagle |
| 1997 | New Town Eagles | 5–1 | Devonport City |
| 1998 | Devonport City | | – |
| 1999 | Glenorchy Knights | 4–3 | Hobart Olympia |
| 2000 | No play-off | | |
| 2001 | University | 1–0, 3–2 | Launceston City |
| 2002 | South Hobart | 3–2, 2–2 | Devonport City |
| 2003 | Devonport City | 2–1 | University |
| 2004 | Devonport City | 2–1 | Hobart Zebras |
| 2005 | Glenorchy Knights | 4–2 | Launceston City |
| 2006 | Somerset | 2–2 (3–1(p)) | Glenorchy Knights |
| 2007 | Hobart Zebras | 3–1 | Somerset |
| 2008 | South Hobart | 3–0 | Devonport City |
| 2009 | Clarence United | 3–1 | South Hobart |
| 2010 | South Hobart | 1–0 | Northern Rangers |
| 2011 | South Hobart | 3–1 | New Town Eagles |
| 2012 | South Hobart | 2–1 | Northern Rangers |
| 2013–present | see National Premier Leagues Tasmania | | |

=== Most Championships ===
| Rank | Team | Number |
|---|---|---|
| 1 | South Hobart | 21 |
| 2 | Hobart Zebras (Juventus) | 10 |
| 2 | Devonport City | 10 |
| 4 | Newtown Eagles (White Eagle) | 8 |
| 4 | Hobart Olympic (Olympia) | 8 |
| 6 | Kingborough Lions (Caledonians) | 7 |
| 6 | Sandy Bay | 7 |
| 8 | Glenorchy Knights (Croatia) | 6 |
| 9 | Rapid | 5 |
| 10 | Cascades | 4 |
| 10 | Metro | 4 |

=== Statewide League Seasons ===
| Year | Champion | Runner up |
|---|---|---|
| 1978 | White Eagle | Glenorchy Croatia |
| 1979 | Rapid | Caledonians |
| 1980 | Rapid | Glenorchy Croatia |
| 1981 | Brighton Caledonians | Launceston Juventus |
| 1988 | White Eagle | Hobart Olympia |
| 1989 | White Eagle | Hobart Juventus |
| 1990 | White Eagle | Hobart Juventus |
| 1991 | White Eagle | Hobart Juventus |
| 1992 | Devonport City | White Eagle |
| 1993 | Devonport City | White Eagle |
| 1994 | Devonport City | Launceston Juventus |
| 1995 | White Eagle | Launceston Juventus |
| 1996 | White Eagle | Devonport City |
| 1997 | New Town Eagles | Devonport City |
| 1998 | Devonport City | Glenorchy Knights |
| 1999 | University | Launceston City |
