= John Kosmina Medal =

The John Kosmina Medal was a National Premier Leagues award given to the player of the match in the NPL Grand Final, which was held between 2013 and 2019. The medal is named after John Kosmina, who played for the Australia national soccer team between 1976 and 1988.

== List of winners ==
Year	Player	Club	Reference
2013	(Australia) Glen Trifiro	Sydney United 58	
2014	(Australia) David Vrankovic (Note: Player on the losing team)	Bonnyrigg White Eagles	
2015	(Australia) Joey Gibbs	Blacktown City	
2016	(Australia) Glen Trifiro	Sydney United 58	
2017	(Scotland) Sean Ellis	Heidelberg United	
2018	(Australia) Anthony Ture	Campbelltown City	
2019	(Australia) Harry Callahan	Wollongong Wolves	

== See also ==
- Joe Marston Medal
- Johnny Warren Medal
- Mark Viduka Medal
- Michael Cockerill Medal
