= Warrior Park =

Sports venue in Hobart, Tasmania

Coordinates: 42.856°S 147.380°E

Empire Couriers Park, formally known Warrior Park, is the home ground of association football club Olympia FC Warriors who play in the NPL Tasmania. Empire Couriers Park is situated in the Greater Hobart suburb of Warrane.
