= New Town Eagles SC =

New Town White Eagles
- Full name: New Town White Eagles Soccer Club
- Founded: 1961
- Ground: Clare Street, New Town
- Capacity: 1,000
- President: Liam Brown
- Manager: David Cox
- League: Southern Championship
- 2024: 3rd of 10
- Website: http://newtownwhiteeagles.com/
Home colours	Away colours

New Town Eagles Soccer Club is a football (soccer) club which represents New Town in the Tasmanian Southern Championship. The club also fields teams in all junior divisions. New Town Eagles play their home games at Clare Street, in New Town.

The club began life as White Eagle, who proudly represented the Polish migrant community in Tasmania. Many Poles came to Tasmania immediately after World War II to seek a new life and better conditions following the devastation of the war. Many Poles who came to Tasmania found good jobs on the dangerous but well paid giant dam-building schemes of the then "Hydro-Electric Commission" (now Hydro Tasmania). These new migrants brought many of their traditions with them from home, one of which of course was football.

White Eagle was formed in 1961, and enjoyed immediate success, winning the KO Cup in their first year. White Eagle first entered the Southern Premier League in 1964, although some of their players may have previously represented the failed Hydro side which played in the competition from 1955 until 1957. The team entered the top tier of the southern competition after winning the first division in only their second season of existence in 1963.

Throughout their history White Eagles drew strongly from the migrant Polish community, and this has continued after being forced to change their name to New Town Eagles in 1997 when it was decided all Australian football clubs should end their ethnic affiliations. As of 2006, New Town Eagles have won the State Championship 8 times, making them equal second with Hobart Zebras on the all time winners list. They enjoyed a great run in the short lived Tasmanian State League in the late 1980s winning the competition from 1988 to 1991 every year.

== Honours ==
- State Championship: (8 times) 1977, 1978, 1988, 1989, 1990, 1991, 1995, 1997
- State Championship Runners-up: (5 times) 1968, 1986, 1994, 1996, 2011
- Southern Premierships: (6 times) 1977, 1986, 1989, 2021, 2022, 2023
- Southern Premier Runners-up: (twice) 1968, 2012
- KO Cup Winners: (4 times) 1987, 1989, 1996, 1997
- Summer Cup Winners: (11 times) 1974, 1976, 1977, 1990, 1991, 1992, 1994, 1996, 1997, 2000, 2021
- Summer Cup Runners-up: (9 times) 1978, 1986, 1988, 1989, 1993, 1999, 2001, 2002, 2006
- Cadbury Charity Cup Winners: (twice) 1987, 1991
- Cadbury Charity Cup Runners-up: (twice) 1992, 1993
- Cadbury Trophy Winners: (twice) 1988, 1994
- Cadbury Trophy Runners-up: (5 times) 1978, 1986, 1989, 1992, 1993
- DJ Trophy Winners: (once) 1976
- Falkinder and Association Cup Winners: (once) 1968
- Falkinder and Association Cup Runners-up: (once) 1969
- Association Cup: (once) 1968

== Current squad ==
Nationality given from place of birth Note: Flags indicate national team as defined under FIFA eligibility rules; some limited exceptions apply. Players may hold more than one non-FIFA nationality.

No.	Pos.	Nation	Player
—	GK	AUS	Jamie Cook
—	DF	AUS	Oliver Johnstone
—	DF	AUS	David Cox
—	DF	AUS	Ash Fisher
—	DF	AUS	Henry Fagg
—	DF	AUS	Toby Butler
—	MF	AUS	Brett Andrews
—	MF	AUS	Andrew Taylor
—	MF	AUS	Andrew Clark
—	MF	AUS	Mark Page
—	MF	AUS	Tyler Hardy (Vice Captain)
—	MF	AUS	Jake Hardy (Captain)
—	FW	AUS	Hsa Kpru
—	FW	AUS	Sam Leszczynski
—	FW	AUS	Ben Whitehall
—	FW	AUS	Adam McKeown
—	FW	BUL	George Ivanov
—	FW	AUS	Matt Pace
