= Cascades FC =

Australian football club

Cascade
- Full name: Cascade; Soccer Club
- Founded: 1931
- Dissolved: 1936
- Ground: N/A
- Capacity: N/A
- Chairman: N/A
- Manager: N/A
- League: Defunct
- 2006: N/A

Cascades Soccer club was a short lived soccer team which represented the workers of the Cascade Brewery in the Southern Premier league from 1931 until 1936. In the years before World War II it was common for companies to enter teams in local soccer competitions as a morale building exercise, and the Cascades Brewery did likewise. In their short life-span of 6 years, Cascade's team was incredibly successful, winning 4 Southern Premierships, as well as 4 state championships, and 4 cup wins.

== Honours ==
- State Championships: 4 times (1931,1932,1934,1935)
- Southern Premierships: 4 times (1931,1932,1934,1935)
- Falkinder Cup Winners: 2 times (1932, 1934)
- Falkinder Cup Runners-up: Once (1933)
- KO Cup Winners: 2 times (1934 (joint),1935)
- KO Cup Runners-up: Once (1932)
