= Townsville Kern United =

Townsville Kern United was an association football club in North Queensland, Australia, established in 1979. The club made it to the finals of the Queensland State Soccer League in its second season, and won the title of Queensland champions in 1982. In addition, it won the Ampol Cup twice. Townsville regularly drew crowds of 5 -8,000 to its home games.

It was the predecessor of the current North Queensland Football Federation (NQFF) State Premier League team, the North Queensland Razorbacks.

The club colours were yellow shirts and Royal Navy blue shorts with the club sponsor "Kern" a local building company blazoned across the chest. All home games were played on a Saturday evening attracting much support from the locals, with back page headlines in the Townsville Bulletin often the norm whenever they played. The code was extremely well supported, more so than most National Soccer League (NSL) teams of that era.

== Notable people ==
Townsville Kern United also managed to attract several high-profile players, such as Paul Wormley, who had previously played professional football in England for Barnsley. Allan Clarke the famous Leeds and England striker of the 70's appeared as a guest player for the club in 1981.
