= Gustavo Girón =

Colombian footballer (born 1986)

Personal information
- Full name: Gustavo Andres Girón Marulanda
- Date of birth: 12 June 1986 (age 40)
- Place of birth: Colombia
- Height: 1.75 m (5 ft 9 in)
- Positions: Striker; attacking midfielder

Team information
- Current team: Gwelup Croatia

Youth career
- 2004–2006: Once Caldas
- 2006–2008: Deportivo Pereira

Senior career*
Years	Team	Apps	(Gls)
2009–2016	Bayswater City		
2016	Arema Cronus	10	(3)
2016–2017	Persegres Gresik United	12	(4)
2017–2021	Bayswater City	63	(33)
2021	Gwelup Croatia	17	(6)
2022–	Sorrento FC	44	(25)
- * Club domestic league appearances and goals as of 23 November 2023

Gustavo Andres Girón Marulanda (born 12 June 1986) is a Colombian footballer who plays for Australian side Sorrento FC.

== Youth career ==
In 2004, Girón also played at youth teams for Once Caldas and Deportivo Pereira in Colombia.

== Career ==
=== Australia ===
In 2009, Girón moved to Australia and signed for Bayswater City having a spell of about 5 seasons in National Premier Leagues and scoring about 120 in total competitions.

Girón also won the golden boot three consecutive seasons (2012–2014) breaking the record of the National premier league in Australia.

Girón has also featured in the state team of Western Australia 4 times, having been a key figure in Western Australia.

=== Indonesia ===
In January 2016 Girón became an Australian citizen, being able to play in Asia as an Asian quota player. He moved to Arema Cronus (then playing in the Indonesia Soccer Championship) in April 2016, playing half a season, scoring 3 goals and playing 7 games. Halfway into the season he moved to Persegres Gresik United.

=== Back to Australia ===
Girón returned to Perth in 2017 to play in the NPL Western Australia, playing for Bayswater City and Gwelup Croatia, before joining Sorrento FC in the 2022 season.
