= Hobart Rangers SC =

Hobart Rangers
- Full name: Hobart Rangers Soccer Club
- Founded: 1958; 67 years ago
- Dissolved: 1967; 58 years ago
- League: Southern Premier League

Hobart Rangers Soccer Club was an Australian soccer club which was based in Hobart, Tasmania. It was established in 1958 out of the old Hydro SC, that played in Tasmanian Division 2 South from 1954 until 1957. The Hydro team was re-branded for the 1958 season, but only lasted for nine seasons due to lack of support. During their short history, the Rangers won both the State Championship and Southern Premiership in 1962. The team qualified for participation in the Australia Cup in 1963.

At the end of the 1967 season, Hobart Rangers merged with Caledonians.

== History ==
Prior to their rebranding as Hobart Rangers, staff of the Drawing Office of the HEC had entered a team in the Southern Division 2 League under the name of "Hydro" from 1954 until 1957. The players who played for the Hydro were either HEC staff or their friends. In 1957 they gained promotion to Division 1 South. They finished last in the Southern Premier League the following two years.

A decision was then taken to use the migration scheme to import a number of Scottish players. This led to the club being renamed Hobart Rangers. The scheme backfired as a number of imports left to join Caledonians and some went to the mainland.

The club continued however the old Hydro ethic had gone. Their successes being enjoyed by recruiting local mercenaries.

When the money ran out so did the players. The club struggled on but eventually lack of success and an ever-increasing workload on a dedicated few took its toll and the club merged with Caledonians.

== Honours ==
- State Championships: Once (1962)
- Southern Premierships: Once (1962)
- Southern Premiership Runners-up: Once (1963)
- Falkinder Cup Winners: Once (1960)
- Association Cup Winners: Once (1963)

== Top players ==
- Walter Worsey, centre forward
