= Clarence United FC =

Australian soccer club

Clarence United
- Full name: Clarence United Football Club
- Founded: 1978
- Dissolved: 2019
- Ground: Wentworth Park, Howrah
- Capacity: 5,500
- League: NPL Tasmania
- 2018: NPL Tasmania, 8th

Clarence United Football Club was a soccer club based in the City of Clarence, Tasmania, which competed in the NPL Tasmania, the second tier of the sport in the country, below the A-League. Founded in 1978, the club spent much of its early history competing in lower divisions, winning several titles and cups. Clarence United was crowned state champions for the first time in 2009. At the conclusion of the 2019 season, they merged with Hobart Zebras FC to form Clarence Zebras FC. Clarence United played their home games at Wentworth Park, a multiple pitch venue located alongside Howrah Beach.

== History ==
In the 1970s there was a lack of association football clubs in the Municipality of Clarence on Hobart's eastern shore, with most of the southern clubs located in Hobart. A group of keen players, many of whom were from the Scottish Australian expatriate community held a meeting in October 1977 to discuss the possibility of forming a new club to enter the 1978 southern competition. The club was formed in 1978 as Phoenix Rovers Soccer Club, and originally wore a Scotland International strip for home matches, and a plain red T-shirt as an alternative away strip. The original committee was Syd Cairns, Mike Barter, Ken Ellison, Trevor Davey, Lloyd Davey, with Syd Cairns appointed as the first coach of the team. Cairns performed this role as an active player-coach. The club only had enough players to form one team in their first season, and were entered into the Southern Division Two competition. The team finished 3rd in a 22 team Division Two competition in their first season.

In 1979 the name was changed to Phoenix Lauderdale Rovers after amalgamating with Lauderdale Soccer Club which gave them enough players to form a reserve team, and in that season the club won their first accolade, being crowned Division Two champions. The club's colours were also changed to the current red and black design. In 1982, they met with Clarence Soccer Club to discuss a merger, but it did not go ahead at that time. The Phoenix team of that season was quite strong, and had on-field success by winning the Rothmans Division One league title and the Michael The Tailors Pre-Season Cup. At the time, Division One was the second tier of football behind the Statewide League, but victory in Division One did not necessarily mean promotion, as there were additional financial requirements for membership in the State League. Phoenix defended their Division One title the following year, and also added the Summer Cup, but were again not promoted to the State League. 1984 was less successful, with the only trophy going to the Division Four reserve side. The merger with Clarence eventually went ahead that year, and a meeting was held where it was agreed the name would change to "PCL United" (Phoenix Clarence Lauderdale). The following year the new PCL United Soccer Club again won the Michael The Tailors Pre-Season Cup Winners, but were unable to follow it up with any league success. The late 1980s brought a fairly barren period for the club, although they picked up a few minor lower division trophies, they were unable to secure any major successes.

Phoenix won the Division Two title in 1989, and backed it up with success in the Knock-out cup, giving them a 'double'. In the early 1990s the club invested in building a new clubhouse, bar and changing room complex in the middle of the Wentworth Park complex. It was the catalyst for a period of major improvement. Junior development teams were highly successful, and dominated many of the age-groups of the Eastern Region Junior Soccer Association competitions. A new cohesion developed as players grew up playing together from a young age, and by 1994 the club had won the Knock-out cup once more. That side, under coach Darren Grainger, led a barnstorming year the following season, as they were crowned Division One winners. It was the club's first senior league success in twelve years. Phoenix also managed to claim the Division Two, and Division Four titles, as well as back-to-back KO Cups. 1996 did not bring league success, but the KO Cup and reserve KO cup were secured, and in 1997 they came second in Division One.

At the start of the 1998 season, Soccer Tasmania led a move for clubs to distance themselves from their traditional ethnic associations on the initiative of Soccer Australia. it was felt that these associations were the cause of many of the problems and violence that plagued football in Australia. Although Phoenix did not have any obvious ethnic connotations, the club used the opportunity to rename itself as Clarence United Football Club. In their first season under their new identity, Clarence United again took the Division One title. After years of trying, Clarence United was finally able to secure entry into the Statewide League for the first time in the 1999 season. Their first season in the Statewide league was an awakening, and proved disastrous. Clarence finished last with only two wins out of sixteen matches, and a goal difference of −55. Even worse, after finally achieving promotion to the Statewide League after so many years of trying, the league was wound up at the end of the 1999 season because of financial troubles. Clarence returned to the Southern Premier League for the 2000 season, but they only fared slightly better, finishing second last ahead of South Hobart. Clarence finished second last every season between 2000 and 2003.

2004 saw a turn around in the club's fortunes, claiming fourth spot in the Southern Premier League. In the mid-2000s, Clarence fairly consistently managed mid-table results, but 2009 brought a long-awaited first-ever Forestry Tasmania State Championship title, and in the same season Clarence United were crowned Premier Men's Statewide Lakoseljac Cup Winners, earning the club a first-ever senior 'double'. At the end of the 2019 season, they merged with Hobart Zebras to form Clarence Zebras FC.

== Colours and crest ==
Clarence United home kit

In their first two seasons, Phoenix originally wore a Scotland strip for home matches, and a plain red t-shirt as an alternative away strip. The best known version was predominantly black, with black shorts, and black socks. Although the club has no longer been known by the name "Phoenix", a phoenix rising out of flames was kept as its logo.

== Ground ==
Clarence United play their home games at Wentworth Park. Three main football pitches occupy the largest section. The city council used it as a landfill rubbish tip.

== Managers ==
Name	Nationality	From	To	Matches	Won	Drawn	Lost	Win %
Syd Cairns	Australia	1977	1981	-	-	-	-	-
Jerome Marron	Australia	1982	1984	-	-	-	-	-
Ron Swift	Australia	1985	1985	-	-	-	-	-
Syd Cairns	Australia	1986	1986	-	-	-	-	-
Mike Barter	Australia	1981	1987	-	-	-	-	-
Arthur Seymour	Australia	1988	29 August 1990	-	-	-	-	-
Greg McGuire (Care-taker)	Australia	29 August 1990	1990	-	-	-	-	-
Colin Minniecon	Australia	1991	1993	-	-	-	-	-
Kam Beta	Australia	1994	1994	-	-	-	-	-
Darren Grainger	Australia	1995	2000	-	-	-	-	-
Les Ware	Australia	2001	2002	-	-	-	-	-
Andrew Brown	Australia	2003	2011	-	-	-	-	-
Ronnie Bolton	Scotland	2011	2012	-	-	-	-	-
Alan Jablonski	Australia	2014	2018	-	-	-	-	-
Warren Burt	Australia	2019	2019	-	-	-	-	-

== Seasons ==
Season	League												Statewide Cup	FFA Cup	Summer Cup
Season	Name (national level)	Pld	W	D	L	GF	GA	GD	Pts	Position	Tasmanian Finals	NPL Finals	Statewide Cup	FFA Cup	Summer Cup
2012	Southern Premier League (2)	21	10	2	9	37	33	4	32	3rd	Quarter-finals	Did not exist	Quarter-finals	Did not exist	Group stage
2013	Southern Premier League (3)	22	7	4	11	60	64	−4	25	8th	N/A	N/A	Round of 16	Did not exist	Group stage
2014	Southern Premier League (3)	20	12	2	6	67	21	46	38	2nd	N/A	N/A	Quarter-finals	DNQ	Group stage
2015	Southern Championship (3)	19	13	3	3	49	28	21	42	2nd	DNQ	DNQ	Round of 16	DNQ	Group stage
2016	NPL Tasmania (2)	21	3	2	16	23	71	−48	11	7th	DNQ	DNQ	Round of 16	DNQ	Group stage
2017	NPL Tasmania (2)	21	4	4	13	23	70	−47	16	7th	DNQ	DNQ	Quarter-finals	DNQ	4th
2018	NPL Tasmania (2)	21	0	3	18	16	100	−84	3	8th	DNQ	DNQ	Round of 16	DNQ	
2019	NPL Tasmania (2)	24	1	0	23	8	160	−152	3	9th	DNQ	DNQ	Round of 16	DNQ	

== Honours ==
- Division 2, 1979, 1989
- Rothmans League Division 1, 1982
- Division 1, 1983, 1998
- Division 2, 1991, 2001, 2002, 2003
- KO Cup, 1989, 1991, 1994, 1997
- Social Cup, 1997
- Division 3, 1999, 2007
- Forestry Tasmania State Championship, 2009
