= Metro FC (Australia) =

Metro
- Full name: Metro Football Club
- Founded: 1941
- Ground: North Chigwell, Claremont
- Capacity: 400
- Chairman: Simon Land
- Manager: Brodie Holmes
- League: Social League 1
- 2024: Champions
Home colours

Metro FC (formerly Metro Claremont Football Club) is a football club formed in 1941 in the northern suburb of Claremont, Hobart, Tasmania. They play at North Chigwell Oval. It has a range of teams for all ages and genders playing in competitions run by the Football Federation Tasmania. Its teams range from under 7s right through to seniors. The teams' colours are yellow and blue.

Metro were relegated to the Southern Division 1 competition in 2008 and have placed 2nd in all but 2 seasons. In 2010, Metro narrowly missed out on promotion to the Southern Tasmanian Premier League, that point the highest league on offer in Tasmania coming second behind Beachside with only one spot for promotion on offer. Metro had a very successful 2014 season taking out the State Vase Cup and Division 1 and 2 championships getting promoted to the Southern Championship for the 2015 season.

After a tough couple of years the club had to pull our Championship and Championship 1 side at the start of 2024.As much as the club and players didn't like the idea it was best for the club moving forward. So after deciding to drop down to the Social league the Club kept the group together as a Senior and Reserves.

Under the Leadership of the so called King of Metro Brodie Holmes took on the role as head coach and after a hard fort season the Metro SL1 team were Crowned Champions for the second time exactly 10 years between them and finishing runners up in the SL1 cup .

== Honours ==
- State Championships: 4 times (1950,1951,1952,1954)
- Southern Premierships: 5 times (1949,1950,1951,1952,1954)
- Southern Premiership Runners-up: 4 times (1946,1947,1948,1953)
- Div 1 winners: Twice (2014, 2024)
- Div 2 winners: twice (1987, 2014)
- KO Cup Runners-up: 2 times (1970,1971)
- Falkinder Cup Winners: Once (1947)
- Falkinder Cup Runners-up: 5 times (1949,1950,1953,1955,1957)
- Summer Cup Winners: Once (1995)
- Summer Cup Runners-up: Once (1977)
- Vase Cup Winners: 3 times (2000,2014,2017)
- Southern Championship 4: Winner (2019)
- Social League 4 Cup: Winner (2019)
