= Glenorchy Knights FC =

Soccer club in Hobart, Tasmania, Australia

Glenorchy Knights
- Full name: Glenorchy Knights Football Club
- Founded: 1957
- Ground: KGV Park
- Capacity: 2,000
- Chairman: Paul Woodham
- Manager: James Sherman
- League: NPL Tasmania
- 2025: 5th of 8
- Website: http://www.glenorchyknights.com/
Home colours	Away colours

Glenorchy Knights Football Club is an Australian football club based in Glenorchy, Tasmania, 7km north of Hobart's CBD. Founded in 1957, the club competes in Australia's second-tier National Premier League, with matches played at KGV Park, a 2,000 capacity stadium.

== History ==
The club was founded in 1957 as Glenorchy Croatia, and experienced almost immediate success, winning the state title for the first time in 1963. They experienced their best success in the 1970s, winning three titles, before having a league lull in the 1980s. However, re-branded as the Glenorchy Knights, they have slowly established a new sense of self, culminating in winning the State Championship for the first time in 13 years in 2005, and narrowly missing out on back to back state titles by losing a penalty shoot-out to Somerset in 2006. In 2010, Glenorchy Knights finished in 3rd Position in the Forestry Tasmania Southern Premier League.

In 2012 Glenorchy Knights were accepted with a license to participate in a new Tasmanian statewide league NPL Tasmania between 2012 and 2015.

In 2015 Glenorchy Knights were unsuccessful in their application to remain within the NPL Tasmania and returned to lower Southern Championship in 2016. The 2015 season was particularly poor for the Knights' first grade side, who won just two games all season and finished with a -133 goal difference.

Glenorchy Knights responded by winning three consecutive Southern Championships in 2016, 2017 and 2018, losing just three time in 49 games. In 2021, they won the NPL title, downing powerhouse club, Devonport, in the final round of the season.

In 2024, the club completed the double winning the Tasmanian National Premier League and the Lakoseljac Cup under the guidance of James Sherman in his final season as Head Coach.

In 2025, the club finished 5th.

== Honours ==
- State Championship: 8 times (1970, 1974, 1975, 1992, 1999, 2005, 2021, 2024)
- State Championship Runners-up: 5 times (1978, 1980, 1998, 2006, 2020)
- Southern Premierships: 10 times(1970, 1974, 1975, 2000, 2004, 2005, 2006, 2016, 2017, 2018)
- Southern Premier Runners-up: (9 times) 1967, 1971, 1972, 1973, 1977, 1985, 1986, 1998, 2002
- KO Cup Winners: (9 times) 1963, 1969, 1970, 1978, 2000, 2005, 2012, 2020, 2024
- KO Cup Runners-up: (5 times) 1968, 1974, 2001, 2003, 2017
- Summer Cup Winners: (5 times) 1979, 1982, 1983, 1993, 2003
- Cadbury Charity Cup Winners: (once)1993
- Cadbury Trophy Winners: (3 times) 1978, 1985, 1992
- Falkinder and Association Cup Winners: (once)1964
- Falkinder and Association Cup Runners-up: (5 times) 1962, 1963, 1966, 1970, 1973
- Lloyd Triestino Cup Winners: (2 times) 1972, 1973

== Seasons ==
Season	League												Statewide Cup	FFA Cup
Season	Name (national level)	Pld	W	D	L	GF	GA	GD	Pts	Position	Tasmanian Finals	NPL Finals	Statewide Cup	FFA Cup
2012	South Premier League (2)	21	5	4	12	23	43	−20	19	7th	DNQ	Did not exist	Champions	Did not exist
2013	Victory League (2)	21	4	4	13	30	56	−26	16	7th	DNQ	DNQ	Semi-finals	Did not exist
2014	Victory League (2)	21	3	2	16	28	66	−38	11	7th	DNQ	DNQ	Round of 16	DNQ
2015	Victory League (2)	21	2	0	19	15	148	−133	6	8th	DNQ	DNQ	Round of 16	DNQ
2016	Southern Championship (3)	16	13	2	1	66	11	+55	41	1st	Quarter-finals	Not eligible	Round of 16	DNQ
2017	Southern Championship (3)	16	13	2	1	66	11	+55	41	1st	Semi-finals	Not eligible	Runner up	DNQ
2018	Southern Championship (3)	16	15	1	0	81	10	+71	46	1st	Not held	Not eligible	Round of 16	DNQ
2019	NPL Tasmania (2)	24	10	2	12	58	45	+13	32	5th	Not held	DNQ	Round of 16	DNQ
2020	NPL Tasmania (2)	14	10	1	3	37	13	+24	31	2nd	Not held	Cancelled	Champions	Qualified/cancelled
2021	NPL Tasmania (2)	21	15	5	1	52	16	+36	50	1st	Not held	Cancelled	Runner up	DNQ

== See also ==
- List of Croatian soccer clubs in Australia
- Australian-Croatian Soccer Tournament
- Croatian Australian
