= Southern Championship =

Football league in Tasmania, Australia

- Founded: 1900; 126 years ago
- Country: Australia
- Number of clubs: 9
- Level on pyramid: 4 (notionally)
- Relegation to: Southern League 1
- Domestic cup(s): Milan Lakoseljac Cup; Australia Cup
- Current champions: South East United
- Current: 2024 Southern Championship

The Southern Championship is an association football league in Southern Tasmania. It is jointly with the Northern Championship, the second highest level soccer competition in Tasmania. Nationally, it sits below the A-League and NPL Tasmania. It is controlled by the Football Federation Tasmania.

Prior to the 2015 season it was known as the Southern Premier League and for sponsorship reasons as the Forestry Tasmania Southern Premier League Between 2001 and 2012 the Southern and Northern Premier Leagues were jointly the state's highest level of soccer competition (but still nationally below the NSL and A-League). During this period the two regional leagues determined a southern and northern champion, who then had a play-off for the state championship.

== Current clubs (2025) ==
| Team | Coach | Home ground | Location |
|---|---|---|---|
| Hobart City FC | Michael Monticchio | Sandown Park | Sandy Bay |
| Clarence Zebras B | Daniel Boscoe | Wentworth Park | Clarence |
| Hobart United | Joseph Stevens | Gunns Oval | Pontville |
| New Town Eagles | Tommy Fotak | Clare Street | New Town |
| Olympia | Alex Holmes | Warrior Park | Warrane |
| South East United | Adam Shackcloth | Pembroke Park | Sorell |
| South Hobart B | Hugh Graham | South Hobart Ground | South Hobart |
| Taroona FC | Diego Atterbury | Kelveden Park | Taroona |
| University of Tasmania | Ahmad Jaradat | Olinda Grove | Mount Nelson |

== Honours ==
| Year | Premiers |
|---|---|
| 1900 | Trinity |
| 1901 | Trinity |
| 1902 | Gunners |
| 1903–1909 | not known |
| 1910 | Hobart |
| 1911 | Westralia |
| 1912 | St George |
| 1913 | Corinthians |
| 1914 | Corinthians |
| 1915-1918 | No competition due to World War 1 |
| 1919 | South Hobart |
| 1920 | South Hobart |
| 1921 | South Hobart |
| 1922 | South Hobart |
| 1923 | South Hobart |
| 1924 | Sandy Bay |
| 1925 | Sandy Bay |
| 1926 | South Hobart |
| 1927 | Sandy Bay |
| 1928 | Hobart Athletic |
| 1929 | South Hobart |
| 1930 | Hobart Athletic |
| 1931 | Cascades FC |
| 1932 | Cascades FC |
| 1933 | Sandy Bay |
| 1934 | Cascades FC |
| 1935 | Cascades FC |
| 1936 | Sandy Bay |
| 1937 | South Hobart |
| 1938 | Sandy Bay |
| 1939 | Sandy Bay |
| 1940-1945 | No competition due to World War 2 |
| 1946 | South Hobart |
| 1947 | South Hobart |
| 1948 | South Hobart |
| 1949 | Metro Claremont |
| 1950 | Metro Claremont |
| 1951 | Metro Claremont |
| 1952 | Metro Claremont |
| 1953 | Caledonians |
| 1954 | Metro Claremont |
| 1955 | Caledonians |
| 1956 | Caledonians |
| 1957 | Caledonians |
| 1958 | Caledonians |
| 1959 | South Hobart |
| 1960 | Caledonians |
| 1961 | Rapid FC |
| 1962 | Hobart Rangers |
| 1963 | Olympia |
| 1964 | Rapid |
| 1965 | Olympia |
| 1966 | Olympia |
| 1967 | Olympia |

| Year | Premiers |
|---|---|
| 1968 | Olympia |
| 1969 | Hobart Juventus |
| 1970 | Glenorchy Croatia |
| 1971 | Hobart Juventus |
| 1972 | Hobart Juventus |
| 1973 | Hobart Juventus |
| 1974 | Glenorchy Croatia |
| 1975 | Glenorchy Croatia |
| 1976 | Rapid FC |
| 1977 | White Eagles |
| 1978 | South Hobart |
| 1979 | Hobart Juventus |
| 1980 | South Hobart |
| 1981 | White Eagles |
| 1982 | Rapid FC |
| 1983 | Hobart Juventus |
| 1984 | Hobart Juventus |
| 1985 | Hobart Juventus |
| 1986 | White Eagles |
| 1987 | Olympia |
| 1988 | Olympia |
| 1989 | White Eagles |
| 1990 | Taroona FC |
| 1991 | University |
| 1992 | University |
| 1993 | University |
| 1994 | University |
| 1995 | Phoenix |
| 1996 | University |
| 1997 | New Town Eagles |
| 1998 | Clarence United |
| 1999 | Kingborough Lions |
| 2000 | Glenorchy Knights |
| 2001 | University |
| 2002 | South Hobart |
| 2003 | University |
| 2004 | Hobart Zebras |
| 2005 | Glenorchy Knights |
| 2006 | Glenorchy Knights |
| 2007 | Hobart Zebras |
| 2008 | South Hobart |
| 2009 | South Hobart |
| 2010 | South Hobart |
| 2011 | South Hobart |
| 2012 | South Hobart |
| 2013 | Beachside FC |
| 2014 | University |
| 2015 | University |
| 2016 | Glenorchy Knights |
| 2017 | Glenorchy Knights |
| 2018 | Glenorchy Knights |
| 2019 | Hobart United |
| 2020 | Olympia |
| 2021 | New Town Eagles |
| 2022 | New Town Eagles |
| 2023 | New Town Eagles |
| 2024 | South East United |

=== Multiple champions ===
| 1. South Hobart | 21 |
| 2. Hobart Zebras (Juventus) | 10 |
| 3. Glenorchy Knights (Croatia) | 9 |
| 3. University | 9 |
| 5. Hobart Olympic (Olympia) | 8 |
| 6. Sandy Bay | 7 |
| 6. Kingborough Lions (Caledonians) | 7 |
| 6. New Town Eagles (White Eagles) | 7 |
| 9. Metro (Claremont) | 5 |
| 10. Rapid FC | 4 |
| 10. Cascades FC | 4 |
| 12. Hobart Athletic | 3 |
| 13. Corinthians | 2 |
| 13. Trinity | 2 |
| 13. Clarence United (Phoenix) | 2 |

== Individual awards ==
The Vic Tuting Medal was originally introduced in the early 1990s to the best and fairest player for Tasmania for the Tasmanian State League competition (equivalent of the current NPL competition). It is now presented to the best and fairest player of the Southern Championship at the end of the season due to a pause of the then State League.

| Season | Winner | Club |
|---|---|---|
| 2008 | Ben Crosswell | Tilford Zebras |
| 2009 | Josh Fielding | Glenorchy Knights |
| 2010 | Josh Fielding | Glenorchy Knights |
| 2011 | Jonathon Ladic | Tilford Zebras |
| 2012 | Shae Hickey | South Hobart |
| 2013 | Miles Barnard | University |
| 2014 | Luke Huigsloot | University |
| 2015 | Luke Huigsloot | University |
| 2016 | Tom Young | Taroona |
| 2021 | Samuel Leszczynski | New Town Eagles |
| 2022 | Luke Huiglsoot | New Town Eagles |
