= Olympia FC Warriors =

Football club in Hobart, Tasmania, Australia

Olympia
- Full name: Olympia FC Warriors
- Nicknames: Warriors, The Grecians
- Founded: 1960
- Ground: Empire Couriers Park, home of the Warriors, 1,000-capacity, Warrane
- Chairman: Apostolis Kaproulias
- Manager: Chris Tsakiris
- League: Southern Championship
- Website: https://www.olympiafc.com.au/
Home colours	Away colours

Olympia Football Club Warriors, known as Olympia FC Warriors, is a professional soccer club based in Hobart, Australia. The club competes in the Southern Championship. The club also fields teams in all junior and youth divisions. Olympia play their home games at Empire Couriers Park, formally known as Warrior Park, in Warrane, Tasmania, a municipality of Clarence.

== History ==
Olympia was formed in 1960 as "The Grecians", and for the most part of their history have been predominantly represented by players of ethnic Greek background. The club headquarters are located at the Hobart Hellenic Club. In 1958 they changed their name to "Olympia" a name which they kept unchanged until 1997, when ethnic affiliations were removed from Australian football. Unwilling to completely depart from their Greek association, the club simply changed 'Olympia' to 'Olympic'. In October 2009 after a revamped new Board, newly elected President George Mamacas started making immediate changes to the ailing club. They reverted to their former ethnically-affiliated name 'Olympia', and added the epithet 'Warriors', as well as adopting a new logo featuring a Spartan warrior's helmet also replacing the 50-year-old shield with a map of the island State of Tasmania to further celebrate the Greek Australian heritage. This decision was made ahead of the club's fiftieth anniversary celebrations, and taken with the full blessing of Football Federation Tasmania.

Olympia have been one of the more successful Tasmanian club, winning the State Championship on seven occasions, although they have struggled to emulate the glory of the 1960s. During the 1960s they won 5 consecutive state championship, 5 Southern titles, 2 Ampol Cup wins, 3 Falkinder Cup wins and 2 Association Cup wins.

Olympia built strong teams throughout the 1980s and 1990s who were highly competitive. The Club has tasted success in cup competitions, winning the Statewide Cup in 2013 and pre-season cups in 2013, 2014 and 2015. It won the Tasmanian Victory League in 2015.

== Seasons ==
Season	League												Milan Lakoseljac Cup	FFA Cup
Season	Name (national level)	Pld	W	D	L	GF	GA	GD	Pts	Position	Tasmanian Finals	NPL Finals	Milan Lakoseljac Cup	FFA Cup
2012	South Premier League (2)	21	8	3	10	42	44	−2	27	6th	DNQ	—	Quarter-finals	—
2013	Victory League (2)	21	10	4	7	51	35	16	34	4th	Semi-final	DNQ	Champions	—
2014	Victory League (2)	21	13	2	6	51	34	17	41	3rd	Semi-final	DNQ	First round	DNQ
2015	Victory League (2)	21	15	3	3	83	14	69	48	1st	Champions	Semi-final	Quarter-final	DNQ
2016	NPL Tasmania (2)	21	9	0	12	51	47	+4	27	4th	Quarter-finals	DNQ	Semi-final	DNQ
2017	NPL Tasmania (2)	21	13	4	4	59	28	+31	43	2nd	2nd	DNQ	Champions	Round of 32
2018	NPL Tasmania (2)	21	9	3	9	45	40	+5	30	5th	Not held	DNQ	Quarter-finals	DNQ
2019	NPL Tasmania (2)	24	18	2	4	80	31	+49	56	2nd	Not held	DNQ	Semi-final	DNQ
2020	NPL Tasmania (2)	14	6	1	7	32	27	+5	19	5th	Not held	Cancelled	TBD	Cancelled

== Honours ==
- State Championship: 1964,1965,1966,1967,1968,1987,1996, 2015
- State Championship Runners-up: 1963
- Southern Premierships: 1963,1965,1966,1967,1968,1987,1988
- Southern Premier Runners-up: 1964,1969
- Milan Lakoseljac Cup Winners: 1964,1968,1972,1988,1995, 2013, 2017
- Milan Lakoseljac Cup Runners-up: 1963,1965,1967, 1975, 2011
- Summer Cup Winners: 1975,1998, 1999, 2005, 2013, 2014, 2015
- Summer Cup Runners-up: 1983,1987
- Cadbury Charity Cup Runners-up: 1987
- Cadbury Trophy Winners: 1986
- Cadbury Trophy Runners-up: 1987,1988,1990,1991
- DJ Trophy Runners-up: 1977
- Falkinder and Association Cup Winners: 1963,1966,1967
- Falkinder and Association Cup Runners-up: 1965
- Association Cup: 1961,1965,1966,1967
- Lloyd Triestino Cup Winners: 1975
- Lloyd Triestino Cup Runners-up: 1973,1974
- Bohemian Cup Runners-up: 1986
