= Northern Rangers FC =

Northern Rangers
- Full name: Northern Rangers Football Club
- Nickname: Rangers
- Founded: 1996
- Ground: NTCA Ground
- Capacity: 200
- League: Northern Championship
- 2024: 1st of 8, Champions
- Website: https://www.northernrangersfc.com/
Home colours

Northern Rangers Football Club is a soccer club which represents Launceston in the Northern Championship. They previously competed in the second-tier NPL Tasmania, but decided to drop back to the third tier after the 2018 season. They continued to play in the third-tier Northern Championship, where their B team previously played.

The club also fields teams in all junior divisions, as well as women's teams. Northern Rangers play their home games at the NTCA Ground in Launceston, Tasmania.

The Northern Rangers entered a junior side under the name "Northern Tasmanian Christian Soccer League Rangers" in the 1996 season. The club first entered the Northern Premier League in 1999. The club finally arrived on 15 August 2009 when it won its first Northern Premier League title and repeated as champions in 2010 and 2012. It participated in the inaugural season of the National Premier Leagues Tasmania in 2013, having previously competed in the Northern Premier League

== History ==
Northern Rangers formed in 1996 when a group of players playing amateur six-a-side competitions in Riverside decided to combine their teams to form one 11-a-side team and enter the NTJSA under the banner of the Northern Tasmanian Christian Soccer League Rangers (NTCSL Rangers). The players were all under 16.

Around 18 players formed the first Northern Rangers side. The team went through the 1996 season undefeated to win the under-16 premiership in its debut season against strong opposition.

The following years saw the rapid expansion of the club with two teams entered in 1997. In 1998 NRFC finished one in rankings but lost the McDonalds Cup to Launceston City FC in a dramatic penalty shoot out. 1998 produced one player who would become a household name at the NTCA in the future, Derek Schipper.

In 1999, most of the players were too old to play in the junior competitions, so it was decided to try to gain a position in the Northern Premier League, and the Northern Rangers were officially founded as a senior side. Rangers finished with 2 wins and 2 draws in the seniors, 4 wins and 1 draw in the reserves. The under-17s took the premiership under the guidance of coach Mark Ackerly.

In 2000, Mark Ackerly took on the senior coaching role and with some key recruits in Damire Metric and his younger brother Goran both from Bosnia, Adam Whitemore, Tony Ludby and Seb Deak From George Town the side was strengthened and more consistency was achieved. The club also was able to reach the final in the statewide vase competition.

In 2003 Mark Spicer joined the club as the first contracted coach to the Northern Rangers. He helped the club finish in fourth place on the senior table two years running and third for the Reserves for the two years also. For the first time Northern Rangers were a consistent and challenging force in the Northern Premier League.

In 2007 the club's Reserves took the Northern Premier Reserve Grade Champions.

The club won its first Northern Premier League title on 15 August 2009 with a last minute winner against Devonport. The club secured its second consecutive Northern Premier League on August the 7th 2010 with a 3-nil victory over Somerset at Cardigan Street with a week to spare.

The club secured its third title in four seasons on 18 August 2012, with a 4–1 home victory against Somerset. In the same year the club was accepted into the inaugural Statewide Victory League.

They dropped down to the third tier Northern Championship following the 2018 season.

== Seasons ==
Season	League												Statewide Cup
Season	Name (national level)	Pld	W	D	L	GF	GA	GD	Pts	Position	Tasmanian Finals	NPL Finals	Statewide Cup
2009	Northern Premier League (2)	16	12	3	1	56	24	32	39	1st	Runners-up	Did not exist	First round
2010	Northern Premier League (2)	16	12	3	1	56	24	32	39	1st	Runners-up	Did not exist	First round
2011	Northern Premier League (2)	16	13	1	2	44	17	27	40	2nd	Runners-up	Did not exist	First round
2012	Northern Premier League (2)	16	13	0	3	57	21	36	39	1st	Runners-up	Did not exist	First round
2013	Victory League (2)	21	7	6	8	56	39	17	27	5th	DNQ	DNQ	First round
2014	Victory League (2)	21	11	3	7	51	38	13	36	4th	Final	DNQ	
2015	Victory League (2)	21	8	7	6	63	34	29	31	4th	Quarter-final	DNQ	
2016	NPL Tasmania (2)	21	1	3	17	20	75	−55	6	8th	DNQ	DNQ	
2017	NPL Tasmania (2)	21	5	5	11	27	51	−24	20	5th	Semi-final	DNQ	
2018	NPL Tasmania (2)	21	6	2	13	39	68	−29	20	6th	Not held	DNQ	
2019	Northern Championship (3)	21	16	4	1	69	16	53	52	1st	Not held	Not eligible	
2020	Northern Championship (3)	14	8	2	4	45	23	22	26	2nd	Not held	Not held	
2021	Northern Championship (3)	21	6	4	11	40	44	(4)	22	6th	Not held	Not held	
2022	Northern Championship (3)	21	16	1	4	70	22	48	49	1st|			
2023	Northern Championship (3)	21	15	1	5	84	24	60	46	2nd			
2024	Northern Championship (3)	20	16	3	1	99	18	81	51	1st|			
2025	Northern Championship (3)	21	17	2	2	71	22	49	53	1st|			

== Honours ==
- Northern Championship Champions: 2009; 2010; 2012; 2019, 2022, 2024, 2025
- Northern Championship Women's Premiers: 2017; 2018
- Northern Championship 1 Premiers: 2007; 2008; 2012; 2015, 2023
- Northern Championship Under 18 Premiers: 2016; 2020
- Northern Championship Under 17 Premiers: 1999; 2001
- Northern Championship Under 16 Premiers: 2021
- Forestry Tasmania State Final Series Runners up: 2010; 2012
- Milan Lakoseljac Statewide Cup Runners up: 2009
- Steve Hudson Cup Winners: 2006; 2014

== Records ==
Record Games holder

- Gabriel Tams 300+
- Marshall Pooley 300+
- Patrick Lanau-Atkinson 250+
- Tenzing Anderson 250+
- Hayden Vandervelde 250+
- Zac Chugg 250+
- Daniel Sparshott 250+
- Derek Schipper 200+
- Ash Vandervelde 200+

Club Best and Fairest Winners Men's

- 1999: Tim Armstrong
- 2000: Derek Schipper
- 2001: Derek Schipper, Tim Schipper
- 2002: Tim Schipper
- 2003: Adam Whitemore
- 2004: Sam Luck
- 2005: Sam Luck
- 2006: Derek Schipper
- 2007: Thataetsile Kakadumane
- 2008: Thataetsile Kakadumane, Derek Schipper, Mark Ambrose
- 2009: Derek Schipper, Todd Hingston
- 2010: Todd Hingston
- 2011: Derek Schipper
- 2012: Chris Hunt
- 2013: Todd Hingston, Ryan McCarragher
- 2014: Todd Hingston
- 2015: Yitay Towns
- 2016: Harry Thannhauser
- 2017: Harry Thannhauser
- 2018: Harry Thannhauser, Patrick Lanau-Atkinson
- 2019: Rob Gerrard
- 2020: Wes Chugg
- 2021: Daniel Sparshott, Bryley Jordan
- 2022: Jonny Burk
- 2023: Patrick Lanau-Atkinson
- 2024: Bryley Jordan
- 2025: Bryley Jordan

Club Best and Fairest Winners Women's

- 2007: Arlene Crooks
- 2008: Rebecca Wheatley
- 2009: Arlene Crooks
- 2010: Felicity Shaw
- 2011: Felicity Shaw
- 2012: Emma Langley
- 2013: Emma Langley
- 2014: Emma Langley
- 2015: Becky Grennell
- 2016: Emma Langley
- 2017: Emma Langley
- 2018: Mickayla Anderson
- 2019: Moana Chambelin, Febey Pearce
- 2020: Kelsie Youd
- 2021: Febey Pearce
- 2022: Abbie Chugg
- 2023: Moana Chambelin

Individual honours

- George Dale Medal Winner: Derek Schipper(2006), Todd Hingston(2009, 2010, 2011 & 2012), Rob Gerrard 2019
- 2006: Tasmanian State team selection: Derek Schipper / Marshall Pooley
- 2007: Tasmanian State team selection: Thataetsile Kakadumane
- 2008: Tasmanian Youth A-League Team: Mark Ambrose / Marshall Pooley
- Fred Paice Medal Winners (Best & Fairest Winners Reserve Comp): Gabriel Tams (2003, 2008, 2012), Oytun Aykiran (2004), Peter Mcbeath (2005, 2007), Marshall Pooley (2015,2017)
- Under 18 League Best and Fairest winners: Stefan Jago (2009), Yitay Towns (2011)
- Northern Premier League Coach of the Year: Mitchell Billing (2002), Roslan Sa'ad (2009), Adam Whitemore (2010)
- Mitsubishi Medal Winners (Best & Fairest Winners PS4 National Premier League) : Yitay Towns (2015)

Life Members

- 2000: David Hughes
- 2003: James Park
- 2005: Brendan Lichtendonk
- 2008: Mark Ackerly
- 2008: Ian Loft
- 2011: Luke Connors
- 2011: Derek Schipper
- 2014: Marshall Pooley
- 2014: Rod Fulton
- 2018: Gabriel Tams
- 2021: Cherie Chugg
- 2024: Patrick Lanau Atkinson
- 2024: Tenzing Anderson
- 2025: Hayden Vandervelde
- 2025: Zac Chugg
- 2025: Daniel Sparshott

Club Presidents

- 1999–2002: David Hughes
- 2002–2011: Mark Ackerly
- 2012–2016: Mark Jefferson
- 2016: Coz Egberts
- 2017–2020: Rod Fulton
- 2021-2025: Gavin Stone
- 2026: Jesse Fulton

Treasurer

- 1999–2004: James Park
- 2005–2006: Rod Fulton
- 2007–2017: Marshall Pooley
- 2018: Vaishali Harinandan
- 2019-2020: Niki Fulton
- 2021 -2022: Nic Edwards
- 2023: Nateah Vandervelde
- 2024-current Mitch Souter

Vice President

- 2008–2013: Luke Connors
- 2014: Mark Ackerly
- 2015: Rod Fulton
- 2016–2017: Gary Harris-Newsham
- 2018: Marshall Pooley
- 2019: Tony MacNevin
- 2020: Dale Coombe
- 2021: Marshall Pooley
- 2022: Marshall Pooley
- 2023: James Ower
- 2024-2025: Jesse Fulton
- 2026: Gavin Stone

Secretary

- 2003–2006: Jenny Pooley
- 2007: Tanya Cotrell
- 2008–2011: Brendan Lichtendonk
- 2012–2013: Mark Ackerly
- 2014–2022: Cherie Chugg
- 2023-current: Febey Chugg

Coach Senior Men's Team

- 1999: David Hughes
- 2000–2002: Mark Ackerly
- 2003–2005: Mark Spicer
- 2006–2008: Mitch Billing
- 2009: Roslyn Saad
- 2010–2011: Adam Whitemore
- 2012: Peter MacBeath
- 2013: Peter Savill
- 2014: Tim Lunnon
- 2015–2016: Dane Hudson
- 2017–2018: Lino Scuilli
- 2019: Rod Fulton
- 2020: Fernando Munoz
- 2021: Rohan Pooley
- 2022-2023: Peter Savill
- 2024: Jack Bowman
- 2025: Rod Fulton
- 2026: Nick Lanau-Atkinson

Coach Senior Women's Team

- 2007–2010: John Crooks
- 2011–2013: Andrew Langley
- 2014: Josh Myer
- 2015–2018: Rod Fulton
- 2019-2020: Ian Loft
- 2021-2022: Stephen Pearce
- 2023: Jo Haezebrouck, Rod Fulton

Club Senior Men's Team Captain

- 1999: Jamie Cogger
- 2000–2001: Ben McKinnon
- 2002: Mitch Billing
- 2003–2004: Adam Whitemore
- 2005: Rohan Pooley
- 2006: Peter Mcbeath
- 2007: Rohan Pooley
- 2008 TT Kakadumane
- 2009–2011: Sam Luck
- 2012: Declan Cuschieri
- 2013–2014: Todd Hingston
- 2015–2018: Nick Lanau-Atkinson
- 2019-2023: Zac Chugg
- 2024: Zac Chugg & Pat Lanau-Atkinson
- 2025: Jesse Fulton & Pat Lanau-Atkinson

Club Senior Women's Team Captain

- 2007–2009: Arlene Crooks
- 2010–2011: Sharelle Preston
- 2012–2014: Felicity Shaw
- 2015–2017: Emma Langley
- 2018–2020: Jess Loft
- 2021: Febey Pearce
- 2022: Georgina Perkins
- 2023: Abbie Chugg

Senior Mens Team League records

- First Senior Game played: 10 April 1999, against Launceston United at Birch Avenue.
- First Senior Win: 5 June 1999, Northern Rangers defeated George Town Utd. 5–2 at the NTCA.
- Greatest Winning Margin: 14 August 2015, Northern Rangers defeated Glenorchy Knights 12–1 at NTCA Ground.
- Greatest Losing Margin: 10 April 1999, Launceston United defeated Northern Rangers 14–2 at Birch Avenue.
- Best Finish to a Season Men's: 2010, 1st place out of 9 with 12 wins, 3 draws, 1 loss, 56 goals for and 23 against.
- Worst Finish to a Season: 1999, 10th place out of 11 with 2 wins, 2 draws, 16 losses, 41 goals for and 111 against

Senior Women's Team League records

- Best Finish to a Season Women's: 2017, 1st place out of 8 teams
