= Southern FC =

Southern Football Club
- Southern F.C. logo
- Nickname(s): Southern FC
- Founded: 1958 (as Rapid SC); 1997 (as Kingston Cannons); 2009 merged
- Ground: Sherburd Park
- Manager: Scott Pepper
- League: Southern Championship
- 2016: 8th
Home colours	Away colours

Southern Football Club is a football club from Kingston, Tasmania, Australia. They compete in the Southern Championship of the Football Federation Tasmania. The club was formed in 2009 by the merger of two existing clubs, Kingston Cannons and Christian United.

== History ==
=== Rapid FC ===
Rapid FC was founded in 1958. Rapid was highly successful during its life winning the State Championship 4 times, and the Southern Premiership 5 times. For a brief period in the 1980s, due to sponsorship reasons, they were known as Rapid-Wrest Point, before switching back. They played their final match in 1996, being relegated in the process to the Southern League 2.

The name was changed and the club reformed as Kingston Cannons. They immediately won the Southern League 2 and were promoted back to the League 1.

=== Merger ===
At the end of the 2009 season, Kingston Cannons merged with Christian United to form Southern FC. In 2013 they won the Southern League 1 title and were runners up in 2014 gaining promotion into the Southern Championship.

== Honours ==
Honours as Southern FC:

- Southern League 1 Runners-up 2014
- Southern League 1 Premiers 2013

Honours as Rapid:

- State Championship (×4): 1976, 1979, 1980, 1982
- Southern Premierships (×5): 1958, 1961, 1964, 1976, 1982
- Southern Premier Runners-up (×5): 1959, 1962, 1974, 1983, 1984
- KO Cup Winners (×4): 1974, 1979, 1980, 1984
- Summer Cup Runners-up: 1984
- Falkinder Cup Runners-up: 1958
- Association Cup Winners (×2): 1961, 1965
- Ascot Gold Cup Winners: 1961
- DJ Trophy Winners: 1977
- Cadbury Trophy Winners (×2): 1982, 1983
- Cadbury Trophy Runners-up (×3): 1979, 1980, 1984
