= University of Tasmania SC =

Football club in Hobart, Tasmania, Australia

- Full name: University of Tasmania Soccer Club
- Nickname(s): "The Bees", "The Students"
- Founded: 1949
- Ground: Olinda Grove Football Ground, Mount Nelson
- Capacity: 600
- Chairperson: Rowan Dix
- Coach: Mark Astley
- League: Southern Championship
- 2024: 7th of 10
- Website: http://tasuniversitysoccer.org.au/
Home colours	Away colours

The University Soccer Club is a soccer club that represents the University of Tasmania in the Tasmanian Southern Championship, which fields both men's and women's teams.

== History ==
The university first competed in the KO Cup in 1957, although it is believed football was played here prior to this time. They did well in their inaugural year, although drawing the KO Cup final 1–1 against South Hobart, they won on the toss of a coin. They won again after a 1–1 draw the following year, this time against ANM and by right of the most corners in extra-time.

Crowned 1960 Division 1 champions, and promoted into the Southern Premier League for the first time where they finished 5th in their first season. University only lasted 1 season before being relegated in 1962, moving in and out of the premier league for most of the 1960s, 1970s and 1980s. 1983 saw University finish 3rd, their best result in over 20 years of league football, but they were soon finishing mid to low table again. The club dominated the Southern Premier League in the early 1990s, but failed to win promotion into the State League due to poor facilities. The club's first real success came with their first ever Tasmanian State League title in 1999, just one season after receiving promotion into the State League for the first time ever. They followed this up with a second state title via play-off versus Northern champions Launceston City in 2001. University have not found statewide success since, losing the 2003 state title play-off to Devonport City FC, following their Southern Premier League title win.

Most recently, they have performed well in the newly renamed Southern Championship, with back to back titles in 2014 and 2015, and runners-up in 2019 and 2020.

== Home ground ==
University play their home games at Olinda Grove Football Ground, in Mount Nelson, Tasmania. Olinda Grove has two full size grounds and a smaller youth ground. The pitch has an enclosed canteen area above the change rooms that overlooks all three pitches.

== Honours ==
- State Championship: (twice) 1999, 2001
- Southern Premierships: (10 times) 1991, 1992, 1993, 1994, 1996, 1997, 2001, 2003, 2014, 2015
- Southern Premier Runners-up: (3 times) 2004, 2019, 2020
- KO Cup Winners: (3 times) 1957, 1958, 2006
- KO Cup Runners-up: (4 times) 1959, 1963, 1965, 2004
- Cadbury Trophy Runners-up: (once) 1994
- Summer Cup Winners: (3 times) 2002, 2006, 2023
- Falkinder Cup Runners-up: (once) 1961

== Individual honours ==
Tasmanian Southern Premier League Player of the Year Award

- 2013 – Miles Barnard
- 2014 – Luke Huigsloot
- 2015 – Luke Huigsloot
- 2019 – Tom Roach

Tasmanian Southern Championship 1 Player of the Year

- 2019 – Patrick Watts
- 2020 – Samuel Howcroft

Tasmanian Southern Premier League Leading Goalscorer Award

- 2014 – Luke Huigsloot
- 2015 – Luke Huigsloot
- 2022 – George Ivanov

Tasmanian Southern Premier League Reserve Leading Goalscorer Award

- 2014 – John Buga
- 2015 – Sam Platts
- 2019 – Manny Hennicke

Tasmanian Southern Premier League Under 20 Leading Goalscorer Award

- 2014 – Ronald John
- 2015 – Connor Thompson
