= Hobart Zebras FC =

Hobart Zebras (Juventus)
- Full name: Hobart Zebras (Juventus) Football Club
- Nicknames: Zebras, Juve
- Founded: 1956
- Dissolved: 2019
- Ground: KGV Park
- Capacity: 4,000
- President: Nick Di Giovanni
- Manager: David Smith
- League: NPL Tasmania

Hobart Zebras Football Club (also known as Tilford Zebras or just Zebras) was an association football club based in Hobart, Tasmania, Australia. It competed in the NPL Tasmania. The club used the colours of Juventus FC and had historical ties to the club.

== History ==
The club was founded in 1956 under the name "Juventus Soccer Club". The club competed on the national stage in the 1985 and 1986 NSL Cup competitions. They were primarily known as "Hobart Juventus" until 1997. In 1997, Australian soccer made the decision to end ethnic affiliations between Australian football teams, as a result the club changed its name to Hobart Zebras FC in 1998. Despite the ban on such affiliations, the club still has strong links to the expatriate Italian community in Hobart. Hobart Zebras were one of the states most successful sides, having been state champions 8 times, most recently in 1993, and southern champions 9 times, most recently in 2004. 2007 saw the club win the State Premiership, Southern Premiership and the Summer Cup. The women's team won the Super League in 2019. At the end of the 2019 season, they merged with Clarence United to form Clarence Zebras FC.

== Managers ==
- 2010–2011: Romeo Frediani
- 2012: Eammon Kelly
- 2015: Chris Hey
- 2016–2017: Peter Savill
- 2017: Tommy Fotak
- 2017–2018: Gabriel Markaj
- 2018–2019: David Smith

== Seasons (men) ==
Season	League												Statewide Cup	FFA Cup
Season	Name (national level)	Pld	W	D	L	GF	GA	GD	Pts	Position	Tasmanian Finals	NPL Finals	Statewide Cup	FFA Cup
2012	South Premier League (2)	21	8	5	8	51	52	-1	29	5th	DNQ	Did not exist	Quarter-finals	Did not exist
2013	Victory League (2)	21	11	6	4	68	41	27	39	3rd	Semi-finals	DNQ	Final	Did not exist
2014	Victory League (2)	21	15	2	4	63	20	43	47	2nd	Semi-finals	DNQ	Final	DNQ
2015	Victory League (2)	21	12	5	4	57	24	33	41	3rd	Final	DNQ	Quarter-finals	DNQ
2016	NPL Tasmania (2)	21	16	2	3	62	27	+35	50	2nd	Semi-finals	DNQ	Quarter-finals	DNQ
2017	NPL Tasmania (2)	21	9	6	6	49	19	+30	33	4th	Quarter-finals	DNQ	Semi-finals	DNQ
2018	NPL Tasmania (2)	21	12	3	6	65	44	+21	39	3rd	N/A	DNQ	Quarter-finals	DNQ
2019	NPL Tasmania (2)	24	12	6	6	74	36	+38	42	4th	N/A	DNQ	Semi-finals	DNQ

== Honours ==
- State Championships: 9 (1969, 1971, 1972, 1973, 1983, 1984, 1985, 1993, 2007)
- Southern Premierships: 10 (1969, 1971, 1972, 1973, 1979, 1983, 1984, 1985, 2004, 2007)
- KO Cup: 7 (1967,1971,1975, 1982, 1983, 2001, 2003)
- Falkinder Association Cup: 2 (1970, 1973)
- Summer Cup: 9 (1971, 1972,1978, 1981, 1984, 1986, 1987, 1989, 2007, 2008, 2009)
- Ascot Gold Cup: 1960
- Lloyd Triestino Cup: 1974
- Cadbury Trophy: 5 (1984,1987, 1989, 1990, 1991)
- Cadbury Charity Trophy: 1992

== Notable past players ==
List includes players from Hobart Zebras youth or senior teams that have gone on to represent the Australian national team.

- Dominic Longo

== See also ==
- List of sports clubs inspired by others
