= Somerset FC =

Somerset
- Full name: Somerset Football Club
- Founded: 1979
- Ground: Somerset Recreation Ground , Somerset
- Capacity: 400
- President: David Pease
- Manager: Kevin Considine
- League: Northern Championship
- 2023: 1st of 8, Champions
Home colours	Away colours

Somerset Football Club, also known as the "Sharks", is a soccer club which represents Somerset in the Tasmanian Northern Championship. The club also fields teams in all junior divisions, as well as women's teams. Somerset play their home games at Somerset Recreation Ground, in Somerset, Tasmania.

Somerset Football Club was formed in 1979 by a dedicated soccer player known as Nigel Brown. He wanted to create a club for the Somerset and Wynyard area. They began their life playing home games at Wynyard High School, before relocating to the Somerset Recreation Ground (Shark Park).

In 2006 Somerset won the Tasmanian Championship for the first time, having already won the Northern Premier League title. They have subsequently won the Northern Premier League again on seven occasions.

== Honours ==
- State Championship: 2006
- Northern Championship: 2006; 2007; 2013; 2014; 2015; 2016; 2017; 2021; 2023
