= 2027 National Premier Leagues Tasmania =

National Premier Leagues Tasmania
- Season: 2027

The 2027 National Premier Leagues Tasmania is scheduled to be the 15th season of the National Premier Leagues Tasmania, the top-tier men's association football competition in Tasmania. The competition will feature seven clubs, each playing 18 regular-season matches across 21 rounds, followed by a finals series.

The number of participating clubs will fall from ten in 2026 to seven in 2027. Launceston United and Ulverstone were relegated after finishing in the bottom two positions in 2026, while Riverside Olympic withdrew from the competition ahead of the 2027 season. South Hobart will enter the season as defending league champions, having won the 2026 title.

== Teams ==
The following seven clubs have been confirmed by Football Tasmania to participate in the 2027 season.

=== Stadiums and locations ===
Locations of the 2027 National Premier Leagues Tasmania teams

Team	Location	Stadium	Capacity
Clarence Zebras	Hobart (Howrah)	Wentworth Park	1,000
Devonport City	Devonport	Valley Road Ground	1,500
Glenorchy Knights	Hobart (Glenorchy)	KGV Park	4,000
Kingborough Lions United	Hobart (Kingston)	Lightwood Park	5,000
Launceston City	Launceston (Prospect Vale)	Prospect Park	4,000
South East United	Sorell	Pembroke Park	500
South Hobart	Hobart (South Hobart)	Darcy Street	1,500

== Competition format ==
The regular season is scheduled to consist of 21 rounds, with each club playing 18 matches and having three byes, for a total of 63 league matches. A finals series will follow the regular season. Football Tasmania has yet to announce the season dates, fixtures and detailed finals format.
