= 2023 National Premier Leagues Tasmania =

National Premier Leagues Tasmania
- Season: 2023
- Dates: 17 March – 23 September 2023
- Champions: Devonport City
- Matches: 84
- Goals: 364 (4.33 per match)
- Top goalscorer: Roberto Fernandez Garrido (Devonport City) (28 goals)
- Best goalkeeper: Jackson Gardner (Glenorchy Knights)
- Biggest home win: Kingborough Lions 10–0 Riverside Olympic (3 June)
- Biggest away win: Launceston City 1–8 Devonport City (17 June)
- Highest scoring: Kingborough Lions 8–4 Launceston United (9 September)
- Longest winning run: Devonport City (10 matches)
- Longest unbeaten run: Devonport City (11 matches)
- Longest winless run: Launceston United (21 matches)
- Longest losing run: Launceston United (18 matches)

The 2023 National Premier Leagues Tasmania was the 11th season of the National Premier Leagues Tasmania, the top-tier men's association football competition in Tasmania. The season began on 17 March 2023 and concluded with the Grand Final on 23 September. Eight clubs contested the regular season, each playing 21 matches, with Launceston United joining the competition.

Devonport City won the league championship with 55 points, finishing 15 points ahead of second-placed South Hobart. Football Tasmania specified before the season that the club finishing first at the end of the regular season would be crowned the league champion, while the returning finals series would determine a separate finals winner. South Hobart subsequently won the finals series, defeating Devonport City 2–0 in the Grand Final at Valley Road Ground on 23 September.

== Teams ==
=== Stadiums and locations ===
Team	Location	Stadium	Capacity
Clarence Zebras	Hobart (Howrah)	Wentworth Park	1,000
Devonport City	Devonport	Valley Road Ground	1,500
Glenorchy Knights	Hobart (Glenorchy)	KGV Park	4,000
Kingborough Lions United	Hobart (Kingston)	Clennett's Lightwood Park	400
Launceston City	Launceston (Prospect Vale)	Buckby Motors Park	4,000
Launceston United	Launceston (Newstead)	Birch Avenue 1	1,000
Riverside Olympic	Riverside	Windsor Park	2,500
South Hobart	Hobart (South Hobart)	Darcy Street	1,500

Stadium capacities are indicative published ground figures rather than verified 2023 attendance limits.

Locations of the 2023 National Premier Leagues Tasmania teams

== League table ==
Pos	Team	Pld	W	D	L	GF	GA	GD	Pts	Qualification
1	Devonport City (C)	21	18	1	2	68	17	+51	55	League champions and qualification for the finals series
2	South Hobart	21	12	4	5	61	30	+31	40	Qualification for the finals series
3	Glenorchy Knights	21	13	1	7	48	20	+28	40	Qualification for the finals series
4	Kingborough Lions United	21	13	0	8	70	40	+30	39	Qualification for the finals series
5	Clarence Zebras	21	9	2	10	52	53	−1	29	
6	Launceston City	21	8	3	10	26	34	−8	27	
7	Riverside Olympic	21	4	1	16	21	79	−58	13	
8	Launceston United	21	0	2	19	18	91	−73	2	

Source: Dribl
Rules for classification: 1) Points; 2) Goal difference; 3) Goals scored; 4) Head-to-head points; 5) Head-to-head goals scored; 6) Play-off match
(C) Champions

The top four teams qualified for the finals series. There was no relegation from the league at the end of the season.

== Results ==
Home \ Away	CLA	DEV	GLE	KLU	LCI	LUN	RIV	SOU	CLA	DEV	GLE	KLU	LCI	LUN	RIV	SOU
Clarence Zebras		1–2	2–4	3–6	2–1	6–1	5–2	5–4				2–5		9–1		1–6
Devonport City	1–1		2–0	5–2	2–0	6–1	2–0	1–3	5–1		3–1			4–0		2–0
Glenorchy Knights	1–0	0–2		4–0	0–1	2–0	3–0	1–0	4–0				1–0	5–0		1–1
Kingborough Lions United	1–2	0–1	0–1		2–0	8–4	10–0	2–3		4–3	2–0				5–3	
Launceston City	3–1	1–8	2–1	4–3		3–1	2–0	0–2	0–3	0–1		0–2			4–0	
Launceston United	1–2	0–5	0–5	0–4	0–1		1–2	2–3				1–6	2–2		1–1	
Riverside Olympic	0–2	1–5	0–5	1–5	1–0	4–1		0–6	3–2	0–6	1–6					1–6
South Hobart	2–2	1–2	4–3	2–1	1–1	6–1	2–1					1–2	1–1	7–0		

Source: Dribl / BetExplorer
Legend: Blue = home team win; Yellow = draw; Red = away team win.

== Finals series ==
The four highest-placed teams contested a knockout finals series on 16 and 23 September 2023. In the semi-finals, Devonport City defeated Kingborough Lions United 2–1, while South Hobart defeated Glenorchy Knights 2–0. South Hobart then defeated league champions Devonport City 2–0 in the Grand Final, becoming the finals series winners.

Stage	Date	Location	Home team	Score	Away team
Semi-final	16 September	Valley Road Ground	Devonport City	2–1	Kingborough Lions United
Semi-final	16 September	Darcy Street	South Hobart	2–0	Glenorchy Knights
Grand Final	23 September	Valley Road Ground	Devonport City	0–2	South Hobart

== Season statistics ==
=== Top scorers ===
Roberto Fernandez Garrido of Devonport City won the Golden Boot with 28 goals in 21 regular-season matches.

Rank	Player	Club	Goals
1	Roberto Fernandez Garrido	Devonport City	28
2	Nicholas Morton	South Hobart	22
3	Noah Mies	Kingborough Lions United	19
4	Brody Denehey	Devonport City	13
4	Xuan Cappellino	Clarence Zebras	13
6	Ahmad Othman	Kingborough Lions United	12
7	Declan Taylor	Kingborough Lions United	11
8	Kobe Kemp	Kingborough Lions United	10
8	Riley Dillon	Clarence Zebras	10
10	Daniel Sagno	Glenorchy Knights	8
10	Samuel Tooze	Clarence Zebras	8

== Season awards ==
Football Tasmania held its end-of-season awards on 9 September 2023.

Award	Recipient	Club
Golden Boot	Roberto Fernandez Garrido	Devonport City
Golden Glove	Jackson Gardner	Glenorchy Knights
Best and Fairest	Nicholas Morton	South Hobart
Coach of the Year	James Sherman	Glenorchy Knights
Players' Player	Roberto Fernandez Garrido	Devonport City
Rising Star	Rowan Pitt	Glenorchy Knights
Walter Pless Media Award	Roberto Fernandez Garrido	Devonport City
Referee of the Year	Brenton Kopra	
