= 2024 National Premier Leagues Tasmania =

National Premier Leagues Tasmania
- Season: 2024
- Dates: 16 March – 7 September 2024
- Champions: Glenorchy Knights
- Matches: 84
- Goals: 375 (4.46 per match)
- Top goalscorer: Kobe Kemp (Kingborough Lions); Noah Mies (Kingborough Lions) (20 goals each)
- Best goalkeeper: Angus Burdon (Glenorchy Knights)
- Biggest home win: Devonport City 8–0 Launceston United (3 August)
- Biggest away win: Launceston United 0–9 Glenorchy Knights (16 March)
- Highest scoring: Launceston United 4–6 Devonport City (23 March); Kingborough Lions 3–7 Glenorchy Knights (29 June)
- Longest winning run: Devonport City; Glenorchy Knights (6 matches each)
- Longest unbeaten run: South Hobart (13 matches)
- Longest winless run: Launceston United (17 matches)
- Longest losing run: Launceston United (17 matches)

The 2024 National Premier Leagues Tasmania was the 12th season of the National Premier Leagues Tasmania, the top-tier men's association football competition in Tasmania. The regular season ran from 16 March to 7 September 2024, with eight clubs each playing 21 matches. The team finishing first in the league table was crowned champion; no finals series was held.

Glenorchy Knights won the championship on goal difference ahead of South Hobart, with both clubs finishing on 47 points. Glenorchy secured the title following a goalless draw against Devonport City on the final day, while South Hobart defeated Launceston City 2–1. Glenorchy also won the Milan Lakoseljac Cup, completing a league and cup double.

== Teams ==
=== Stadiums and locations ===
Team	Location	Stadium	Capacity
Clarence Zebras	Hobart (Howrah)	Wentworth Park	1,000
Devonport City	Devonport	Valley Road Ground	1,500
Glenorchy Knights	Hobart (Glenorchy)	KGV Park	4,000
Kingborough Lions United	Hobart (Kingston)	Clennett's Lightwood Park	400
Launceston City	Launceston (Prospect Vale)	TassieCare Park	4,000
Launceston United	Launceston (Newstead)	Birch Avenue 1	1,000
Riverside Olympic	Riverside	Windsor Park	2,500
South Hobart	Hobart (South Hobart)	Darcy Street	1,500

Stadium capacities are indicative published ground figures rather than verified 2024 attendance limits.

Locations of the 2024 National Premier Leagues Tasmania teams

== League table ==
Pos	Team	Pld	W	D	L	GF	GA	GD	Pts
1	Glenorchy Knights (C)	21	14	5	2	81	24	+57	47
2	South Hobart	21	14	5	2	58	29	+29	47
3	Devonport City	21	13	6	2	60	19	+41	45
4	Kingborough Lions United	21	11	3	7	66	43	+23	36
5	Launceston City	21	9	4	8	38	34	+4	31
6	Riverside Olympic	21	6	1	14	27	62	−35	19
7	Clarence Zebras	21	3	2	16	28	60	−32	11
8	Launceston United	21	1	0	20	17	104	−87	3

Source: Dribl
Rules for classification: 1) Points; 2) Goal difference; 3) Goals scored; 4) Head-to-head points; 5) Head-to-head goals scored; 6) Play-off match
(C) Champions

== Results ==
Home \ Away	CLA	DEV	GLE	KLU	LCI	LUN	RIV	SOU	CLA	DEV	GLE	KLU	LCI	LUN	RIV	SOU
Clarence Zebras		0–4	1–2	2–6	1–1	6–1	1–2	0–1		0–6	1–3		2–2		0–1	
Devonport City	3–0		1–1	1–2	0–0	8–0	2–0	1–1				4–1	4–1		3–0	
Glenorchy Knights	5–2	4–0		2–2	5–2	4–0	8–1	1–3		0–0		4–2			7–1	
Kingborough Lions United	4–3	0–0	3–7		2–1	5–0	8–1	1–3	3–0				1–2	6–1		1–4
Launceston City	2–1	0–2	0–4	1–3		4–0	2–1	1–2			1–1			3–1		4–2
Launceston United	1–3	4–6	0–9	0–6	0–6		0–5	1–3	3–1	1–6	0–7					3–4
Riverside Olympic	1–2	1–5	0–4	4–3	0–3	4–1		2–2				0–4	0–1	2–0		
South Hobart	3–1	2–2	1–1	3–3	2–1	6–0	5–1		6–1	1–2	3–2				1–0	

Source: Dribl
Legend: Blue = home team win; Yellow = draw; Red = away team win.

== Season statistics ==
=== Top scorers ===
Kobe Kemp and Noah Mies of Kingborough Lions United won the Golden Boot with 20 goals in 21 regular-season matches.

Rank	Player	Club	Goals
1	(Australia) Kobe Kemp	Kingborough Lions United	20
1	(Australia) Noah Mies	Kingborough Lions United	20
3	(Australia) Nicholas Morton	South Hobart	18
3	(England) Thierry Swaby	Launceston City	18
5	(New Zealand) Stefan Cordwell	Glenorchy Knights	17
6	(New Zealand) Joshua Redfearn	Glenorchy Knights	15
7	(Australia) Riley Dillon	Glenorchy Knights	13
8	(Australia) Brody Denehey	Devonport City	9
8	(Japan) Riku Ichimura	Devonport City	9
10	(Australia) Austin Yost	South Hobart	8
10	(Australia) Tyler Harrison	Glenorchy Knights	8

== Season awards ==
Football Tasmania presented its end-of-season awards on 14 September 2024.

Award	Recipient(s)	Club
Golden Boot	Kobe Kemp (20 goals); Noah Mies (20 goals)	Kingborough Lions United
Golden Glove	Angus Burdon	Glenorchy Knights
Best and Fairest	Nick Morton	South Hobart
Coach of the Year	James Sherman	Glenorchy Knights
