= 2026 National Premier Leagues Tasmania =

National Premier Leagues Tasmania
- Season: 2026
- Dates: 7 March – 5 September 2026
- Champions: South Hobart
- Relegated: Launceston United; Ulverstone
- Matches: 90
- Goals: 354 (3.93 per match)
- Top goalscorer: Joshua Tollervey (Devonport City)(21 goals)
- Best goalkeeper: Nicholas O'Connell (Kingborough Lions); Taiga Harper (Devonport City)
- Biggest home win: South Hobart 6–0 South East United (12 April); Riverside Olympic 6–0 Ulverstone (27 June); Devonport City 6–0 Launceston City (8 August)
- Biggest away win: South East United 0–9 Kingborough Lions (14 June)
- Highest scoring: Ulverstone 2–10 Devonport City (7 March)
- Longest winning run: South Hobart (8 matches)
- Longest unbeaten run: South Hobart (13 matches)
- Longest winless run: Ulverstone (13 matches)
- Longest losing run: Ulverstone (10 matches)

The 2026 National Premier Leagues Tasmania was the 14th season of the National Premier Leagues Tasmania, the top-tier men's association football competition in Tasmania. The competition expanded from eight to ten teams, with South East United and Ulverstone joining the eight clubs that had contested the previous season. The regular season was played from 7 March to 8 August 2026, with each club playing 18 matches, followed by a five-team finals series ending on 5 September.

South Hobart won their second consecutive league championship, finishing four points ahead of Devonport City. South Hobart also won the finals series, defeating Devonport City 5–1 in the Grand Final on 5 September 2026, and qualified for the Australian Championship. Launceston United and Ulverstone, which finished ninth and tenth respectively, were relegated ahead of 2027.

Following the conclusion of the season, Riverside Olympic announced that it would withdraw from the National Premier Leagues Tasmania and the Women's Super League ahead of the 2027 season, despite finishing sixth in the NPL. The club cited rising operating costs, administrative requirements and increasing demands on volunteers as reasons for its decision. Football Tasmania subsequently confirmed that the 2027 NPL Tasmania competition would feature seven clubs following Riverside Olympic's withdrawal and the relegation of Launceston United and Ulverstone.

== Teams ==
=== Stadiums and locations ===
Team	Location	Stadium	Capacity
Clarence Zebras	Hobart (Howrah)	Wentworth Park	1,000
Devonport City	Devonport	Valley Road Ground	1,500
Glenorchy Knights	Hobart (Glenorchy)	KGV Park	4,000
Kingborough Lions United	Hobart (Kingston)	Kitchen Centre Park (Lightwood Park)	3,000
Launceston City	Launceston (Prospect Vale)	Community Bank Deloraine & Districts Park	4,000
Launceston United	Launceston (Newstead)	Birch Avenue 1	1,000
Riverside Olympic	Riverside	Windsor Park	2,500
South East United	Sorell	Pembroke Park	500
South Hobart	Hobart (South Hobart)	Darcy Street	1,500
Ulverstone	Ulverstone	Ulverstone Westside Park	500

Stadium capacities are indicative published ground figures rather than verified maximum attendance limits for 2026.

Lightwood Park (commercially known as Kitchen Centre Park), the home ground of Kingborough Lions United, has a published capacity of 3,000 spectators. The venue recorded an attendance of 2,875 spectators for Kingborough's Australia Cup Round of 32 match against Melbourne Victory on 26 July 2026, representing approximately 96% of its published capacity.

Locations of the 2026 National Premier Leagues Tasmania teams

== League table ==
Pos	Team	Pld	W	D	L	GF	GA	GD	Pts	Qualification or relegation
1	South Hobart (C, Q)	18	15	2	1	65	16	+49	47	Qualification for the Australian Championship and finals series
2	Devonport City	18	14	1	3	56	19	+37	43	Qualification for the finals series
3	Kingborough Lions United	18	14	1	3	51	16	+35	43	Qualification for the finals series
4	Launceston City	18	10	1	7	40	36	+4	31	Qualification for the finals series
5	Clarence Zebras	18	8	3	7	30	29	+1	27	Qualification for the finals series
6	Riverside Olympic	18	7	3	8	31	33	−2	24	
7	South East United	18	7	0	11	26	51	−25	21	
8	Glenorchy Knights	18	5	2	11	23	33	−10	17	
9	Launceston United (R)	18	1	2	15	17	61	−44	5	Relegation to the regional championship
10	Ulverstone (R)	18	1	1	16	15	60	−45	4	Relegation to the regional championship

Source: BetExplorer
Rules for classification: 1) Points; 2) Goal difference; 3) Goals scored; 4) Head-to-head points; 5) Head-to-head goals scored; 6) Play-off match
(C) Champions; (Q) Qualified for the phase indicated; (R) Relegated

Note: The match between Ulverstone and South East United on 8 August 2026 finished 3–4, as supported by the match livestream and independently recorded by BetExplorer. The published Dribl league table instead records Ulverstone with 14 goals scored and South East United with 50 goals conceded. The league table therefore follows BetExplorer's final standings, crediting Ulverstone with 15 goals scored and South East United with 51 goals conceded. Their goal differences are consequently −45 and −25 respectively. League positions and points remain unchanged.

== Results ==
Home \ Away	CLA	DEV	GLE	KLU	LCI	LUN	RIV	SEU	SOU	ULV
Clarence Zebras		2–4	2–0	0–4	1–2	1–1	4–0	2–1	1–3	1–0
Devonport City	2–2		2–1	1–0	6–0	2–0	4–1	2–0	1–3	1–0
Glenorchy Knights	2–2	1–2		0–2	1–2	2–1	1–1	3–1	1–2	2–1
Kingborough Lions United	3–1	2–1	3–1		2–1	2–0	1–0	2–0	1–1	5–1
Launceston City	2–0	1–3	2–1	1–3		4–2	2–3	1–0	1–8	4–0
Launceston United	0–1	0–6	0–4	1–7	1–7		0–1	4–6	1–5	3–2
Riverside Olympic	2–4	0–3	3–0	0–3	0–0	2–0		5–0	1–1	6–0
South East United	1–2	1–4	1–0	0–9	1–6	4–1	3–1		1–0	2–0
South Hobart	2–0	3–2	6–1	5–1	3–1	4–1	5–2	6–0		2–0
Ulverstone	0–4	2–10	0–2	2–1	1–3	1–1	2–3	3–4	0–6	

Source: Dribl / BetExplorer
Legend: Blue = home team win; Yellow = draw; Red = away team win.

== Finals series ==
The top five teams from the regular-season league table qualified for the finals series. South Hobart, as league champions, received a bye in the opening week. Devonport City reached the Grand Final by defeating Kingborough Lions in the qualifying final and South Hobart in the second semi-final. South Hobart then defeated Kingborough Lions in the preliminary final and won the Grand Final against Devonport City.

Stage	Date	Home team	Score	Away team
Qualifying final	15 August	Devonport City	2–1	Kingborough Lions
Elimination final	15 August	Launceston City	1–1 (5–3 pens)	Clarence Zebras
First semi-final	22 August	Kingborough Lions	5–0	Launceston City
Second semi-final	23 August	South Hobart	0–3	Devonport City
Preliminary final	29 August	South Hobart	4–2 (a.e.t.)	Kingborough Lions
Grand Final	5 September	South Hobart	5–1	Devonport City

== Season statistics ==
=== Top scorers ===
Joshua Tollervey of Devonport City won the 2026 NPL Tasmania Golden Boot with 21 goals in 18 regular-season matches.

Rank	Player	Club	Goals
1	Joshua Tollervey	Devonport City	21
2	Joel Badger	Kingborough Lions United	18
3	Nicholas Morton	South Hobart	15
4	Kobe Kemp	South Hobart	12
4	Noah Mies	Kingborough Lions United	12
4	Rex Maddock	South Hobart	12
7	Brody Denehey	Devonport City	11
8	Samuel Tooze	Clarence Zebras	9
9	Charles Reynolds	Launceston City	8
9	Devine Samuel	South Hobart	8
9	James Pelletier	Riverside Olympic	8
9	Ryan Lynch	Clarence Zebras	8
9	Yoshiya Okawa	Launceston City	8

== Season awards ==
Football Tasmania presented its end-of-season awards on 12 September 2026.

Award	Recipient(s)	Club
Golden Boot	Joshua Tollervey	Devonport City
Golden Glove	Nicholas O'Connell; Taiga Harper	Kingborough Lions; Devonport City
Best and Fairest	Samuel Berezansky	South Hobart
Coach of the Year	Jon Fenech	Kingborough Lions
