= 2023 Football Tasmania season =

Football Tasmania
- Season: 2023

The 2023 Football Tasmania season was the tenth season of soccer under the restructured format in Tasmania. The men's competitions consisted of three major divisions across the State.

== Men's Competitions ==
=== 2023 NPL Tasmania ===
The 2023 National Premier Leagues Tasmania was the 11th season of the National Premier Leagues Tasmania, the top-tier men's association football competition in Tasmania. The season began on 17 March 2023 and concluded with the Grand Final on 23 September. Eight clubs contested the regular season, each playing 21 matches, with Launceston United joining the competition.

Devonport City won the league championship with 55 points, finishing 15 points ahead of second-placed South Hobart. Football Tasmania specified before the season that the club finishing first at the end of the regular season would be crowned the league champion, while the returning finals series would determine a separate finals winner. South Hobart subsequently won the finals series, defeating Devonport City 2–0 in the Grand Final at Valley Road Ground on 23 September.

Pos	Team	Pld	W	D	L	GF	GA	GD	Pts	Qualification
1	Devonport City (C)	21	18	1	2	68	17	+51	55	League champions and qualification for the finals series
2	South Hobart	21	12	4	5	61	30	+31	40	Qualification for the finals series
3	Glenorchy Knights	21	13	1	7	48	20	+28	40	Qualification for the finals series
4	Kingborough Lions United	21	13	0	8	70	40	+30	39	Qualification for the finals series
5	Clarence Zebras	21	9	2	10	52	53	−1	29	
6	Launceston City	21	8	3	10	26	34	−8	27	
7	Riverside Olympic	21	4	1	16	21	79	−58	13	
8	Launceston United	21	0	2	19	18	91	−73	2	

Source: Dribl
Rules for classification: 1) Points; 2) Goal difference; 3) Goals scored; 4) Head-to-head points; 5) Head-to-head goals scored; 6) Play-off match
(C) Champions

=== 2023 Tasmanian Championships ===
==== 2023 Northern Championship ====
Pos	Team	Pld	W	D	L	GF	GA	GD	Pts
1	Somerset FC (C)	21	21	0	0	85	17	+68	63
2	Northern Rangers	21	15	1	5	84	24	+60	46
3	Ulverstone SC	21	13	2	6	63	44	+19	41
4	Devonport City B	21	9	0	12	42	49	−7	27
5	Riverside Olympic B	21	8	0	13	46	85	−39	24
6	Launceston City B	21	7	1	13	52	61	−9	22
7	Launceston United B	21	5	1	15	30	82	−52	16
8	Burnie United	21	3	1	17	30	70	−40	10

Source: Dribl
Rules for classification: 1) points; 2) goal difference; 3) number of goals scored.
(C) Champions

==== 2023 Southern Championship ====
Pos	Team	Pld	W	D	L	GF	GA	GD	Pts
1	New Town Eagles (C)	16	11	3	2	62	21	+41	36
2	South East United	16	10	1	5	73	53	+20	31
3	South Hobart B	16	9	2	5	48	42	+6	29
4	Olympia Warriors	16	8	2	6	41	36	+5	26
5	University of Tasmania	16	8	1	7	50	41	+9	25
6	Taroona FC	16	7	3	6	43	37	+6	24
7	Hobart United	16	6	3	7	27	33	−6	21
8	Metro FC	16	3	1	12	34	73	−39	10
9	Hobart City Beachside F.C.	16	1	2	13	19	61	−42	5

Source: Dribl
Rules for classification: 1) points; 2) goal difference; 3) number of goals scored.
(C) Champions

== Women's Competitions ==
=== 2023 Women's Super League ===
Women's Super League
- Season: 2023
- Premiers: South Hobart

The 2023 Women's Super League season, known as the MyState Bank Women's Super League for sponsorship reasons, was the eighth edition of the statewide Tasmanian women's soccer league.

Pos	Team	Pld	W	D	L	GF	GA	GD	Pts
1	South Hobart (C)	20	17	3	0	55	6	+49	54
2	Devonport City	20	11	4	5	66	31	+35	37
3	Launceston United	20	11	2	7	42	25	+17	35
4	Clarence Zebras	20	7	1	12	30	51	−21	22
5	Kingborough Lions United	20	5	0	15	36	64	−28	15
6	Taroona	20	3	2	15	23	75	−52	11

Source: Dribl
Rules for classification: 1) points; 2) goal difference; 3) number of goals scored.
(C) Champions

=== 2023 Tasmanian Championships ===
==== 2023 Northern Championship ====
Pos	Team	Pld	W	D	L	GF	GA	GD	Pts
1	Burnie United (C)	21	19	1	1	87	8	+79	58
2	Northern Rangers	21	15	1	5	114	33	+81	46
3	Ulverstone SC	21	14	3	4	80	24	+56	45
4	Riverside Olympic	21	14	1	6	88	37	+51	43
5	Devonport City B	21	6	3	12	30	33	−3	21
6	Launceston United B	21	6	2	13	40	77	−37	20
7	Launceston City	21	4	1	16	20	61	−41	13
8	Somerset FC	21	0	0	21	6	192	−186	0

Source: Dribl
Rules for classification: 1) points; 2) goal difference; 3) number of goals scored.
(C) Champions

==== 2023 Southern Championship ====
Pos	Team	Pld	W	D	L	GF	GA	GD	Pts
1	New Town Eagles (C)	18	15	2	1	69	12	+57	47
2	University of Tasmania	18	12	3	3	67	17	+50	39
3	Olympia Warriors	18	7	4	7	38	37	+1	25
4	South Hobart B	18	7	3	8	35	31	+4	24
5	Kingborough Lions United B	17	2	3	12	14	58	−44	9
6	Clarence Zebras B	17	2	1	14	10	78	−68	7

Source: Dribl
Rules for classification: 1) points; 2) goal difference; 3) number of goals scored.
(C) Champions

== Cup competitions ==
Competition	Winners	Score	Runners-up
Milan Lakoseljac Cup	Devonport City	1–0	South Hobart
Women's State Wide Cup	South Hobart	2–0	Launceston United
State Wide Social Vase		–	

== Awards ==
The end of year awards were presented at Crowne Plaza in Hobart on 9 September 2023.

=== National Premier Leagues Tasmania ===
Award	Men's	Women's
Best & Fairest	Nick Morton (South Hobart)	Jazmin White (Devonport Strikers)
Player's Player	Roberto Fernandez Garrido (Devonport Strikers)	Pishon Choi (South Hobart)
Golden Boot	Roberto Fernandez Garrido (Devonport Strikers)	Jazmin White (Devonport Strikers)
Coach of the Year	James Sherman (Glenorchy Knights)	Karen Wills (Taroona)
Golden Glove	Jackson Gardner (Glenorchy Knights)	Jenna Farrow (South Hobart)
Rising Star	Rowan Pitt (Glenorchy Knights)	Graciella Baez (Clarence Zebras)
Referee of the Year	Brenton Kopra	Elliana Beeston
