= 2025 National Premier Leagues Tasmania =

National Premier Leagues Tasmania
- Season: 2025
- Dates: 14 March – 6 September 2025
- Champions: South Hobart
- Matches: 84
- Goals: 389 (4.63 per match)
- Top goalscorer: Thierry Swaby (Launceston City); Angus Taylor (Launceston City) (25 goals each)
- Best goalkeeper: Nicholas O'Connell (South Hobart)
- Biggest home win: South Hobart 10–0 Launceston United (12 April)
- Biggest away win: Launceston United 0–11 Launceston City (26 August)
- Highest scoring: Launceston City 12–3 Clarence Zebras (2 August)
- Longest winning run: South Hobart; (Launceston City) (6 matches)
- Longest unbeaten run: South Hobart (16 matches)
- Longest winless run: Clarence Zebras; Launceston United (11 matches)
- Longest losing run: Launceston United (11 matches)

The 2025 National Premier Leagues Tasmania was the 13th season of the National Premier Leagues Tasmania, the top-tier men's association football competition in Tasmania. The season began on 14 March and concluded on 6 September 2025, with eight clubs each playing 21 matches. Glenorchy Knights entered the season as defending champions.

South Hobart won the championship, their first state league title since 2017, finishing four points ahead of runners-up Launceston City. As champions, South Hobart qualified for the inaugural Australian Championship.

== Teams ==
=== Stadiums and locations ===
Team	Location	Stadium	Capacity
Clarence Zebras	Hobart (Howrah)	Wentworth Park	1,000
Devonport City	Devonport	Valley Road Ground	1,500
Glenorchy Knights	Hobart (Glenorchy)	KGV Park	4,000
Kingborough Lions United	Hobart (Kingston)	Clennett's Lightwood Park	5,000
Launceston City	Launceston (Prospect Vale)	TassieCare Park	4,000
Launceston United	Launceston (Newstead)	Birch Avenue 1	1,000
Riverside Olympic	Riverside (Riverside)	Windsor Park	2,500
South Hobart	Hobart (South Hobart)	Darcy Street	1,500

Stadium capacities are indicative published ground figures rather than verified 2025 attendance limits.

Locations of the 2025 National Premier Leagues Tasmania teams

== League table ==
Pos	Team	Pld	W	D	L	GF	GA	GD	Pts	Qualification
1	South Hobart (C, Q)	21	17	3	1	84	20	+64	54	Qualification to Australian Championship
2	Launceston City	21	16	2	3	82	22	+60	50	
3	Kingborough Lions United	21	13	2	6	45	33	+12	41	
4	Devonport City	21	10	5	6	57	32	+25	35	
5	Glenorchy Knights	21	10	3	8	50	43	+7	33	
6	Riverside Olympic	21	5	1	15	26	55	−29	16	
7	Launceston United	21	3	1	17	26	101	−75	10	
8	Clarence Zebras	21	1	1	19	19	83	−64	4	

Source: Dribl
Rules for classification: 1) Points; 2) Goal difference; 3) Goals scored; 4) Head-to-head points; 5) Head-to-head goals scored; 6) Play-off match
(C) Champions; (Q) Qualified for the phase indicated

Note: The match between Launceston United and Riverside Olympic on 22 March 2025 finished in a 3–3 draw, as confirmed by the match livestream and independently recorded by BetExplorer. The Dribl fixture listing instead records a 2–2 draw. The league table therefore includes one additional goal scored and conceded by each club compared with the published Dribl standings. League positions, points and goal differences remain unchanged. BetExplorer's season statistics record 389 goals across 84 matches, averaging 4.63 goals per match.

== Results ==
Home \ Away	CLA	DEV	GLE	KLU	LCI	LUN	RIV	SOU	CLA	DEV	GLE	KLU	LCI	LUN	RIV	SOU
Clarence Zebras		2–2	1–5	0–4	0–3	1–2	0–4	0–8				1–4		2–3		2–5
Devonport City	2–0		0–2	1–2	3–2	5–2	3–0	2–2	7–0		1–1			9–2		0–3
Glenorchy Knights	4–1	1–1		1–1	1–5	3–2	4–3	2–4	3–0				1–6	3–0		0–2
Kingborough Lions United	4–1	1–0	0–8		1–1	4–0	3–0	2–3		3–2	3–0				2–0	
Launceston City	3–0	0–1	3–1	3–1		5–0	4–1	1–2	12–3	4–1		2–1			4–0	
Launceston United	2–5	1–8	3–5	1–2	1–6		3–3	1–7				0–1	0–11		0–3	
Riverside Olympic	2–0	1–2	2–4	1–3	1–2	1–3		0–3	1–0	1–5	2–1					0–7
South Hobart	3–0	2–2	3–0	4–2	2–2	10–0	2–0					4–1	1–3	7–0		

Updated to match(es) played on 6 September 2025. Source: Dribl
Legend: Blue = home team win; Yellow = draw; Red = away team win.

== Season statistics ==
=== Top scorers ===
Thierry Swaby and Angus Taylor of Launceston City shared the 2025 NPL Tasmania Golden Boot, scoring 25 goals each during the 21-match regular season.

Rank	Player	Club	Goals
1	Thierry Swaby	Launceston City	25
1	Angus Taylor	Launceston City	25
3	Colin Innes	Devonport City	19
3	Nicholas Morton	South Hobart	19
5	Noah Mies	Kingborough Lions United	16
6	Kobe Kemp	South Hobart	15
7	Riley Dillon	Glenorchy Knights	11
8	Rowan Pitt	Kingborough Lions United	10
9	Jordan Payne	Devonport City	9
10	Alex Walter	South Hobart	8
10	Austin Yost	South Hobart	8

== Season awards ==
Football Tasmania presented its end-of-season awards on 13 September 2025.

Award	Recipient(s)	Club
Golden Boot	Thierry Swaby (25 goals); Angus Taylor (25 goals)	Launceston City
Golden Glove	Nicholas O'Connell	South Hobart
Best and Fairest	Angus Taylor; Nick Morton; Kobe Kemp	Launceston City; South Hobart; South Hobart
Coach of the Year	Daniel Syson	Launceston City
Walter Pless Media Award	Angus Taylor	Launceston City
Referee of the Year	Brenton Kopra	
