= David Owusu =

English Professional footballer

Personal information
- Full name: David Owusu-Akyeaw
- Date of birth: 27 October 1998 (age 28)
- Place of birth: England
- Height: 1.81 m (5 ft 11 in)
- Position: Forward

Team information
- Current team: Launceston United

Youth career
- Merstham
- 2016–2017: Rochdale

Senior career*
Years	Team	Apps	(Gls)
2017	Rochdale	1	(0)
2017–2018	Merstham	0	(0)
2018	Croydon	10	(1)
2018–2019	Whyteleafe	6	(2)
2019	Lordswood	0	(0)
2019–2020	Lewisham Borough	1	(0)
2020	Whyteleafe	0	(0)
2021–2022	Manchester 62	10	(2)
2022	Glacis United	2	(0)
2023–2026	Launceston United		
2026–	Tigers FC	0	(0)
- * Club domestic league appearances and goals as of 6 January 2026

David Owusu-Akyeaw (born 27 October 1998) is an English footballer who plays as a forward for Australian National Premier Leagues Tasmania side Launceston United.

== Playing career ==
Owusu joined EFL League One side Rochdale after impressing on trial in October 2016. He signed his first contract at the club three months later. He made his first team debut after coming on as a half-time substitute in a 4–0 defeat to Oxford United at Spotland on 21 January 2017. He was released a few months later due to injury. After spells at Merstham and Lordswood, Owuso moved to Gibraltar in 2021 to sign for Manchester 62. He made his debut on 16 October, registering an assist in a 2–0 victory over College 1975.

In 2023, Australian National Premier Leagues Tasmania side Launceston City FC.
