= 2020 Football Tasmania season =

Football Tasmania
- Season: 2020

The 2020 Football Tasmania season was the seventh season of soccer under the restructured format in Tasmania. The men's competitions consisted of three major divisions across the State.

All NPL and grassroots competitions were suspended for one month due to the impacts from the COVID-19 pandemic in Australia, effective 18 March to 14 April, and further extended. The NPL and other senior competitions commenced on 18 July.

== Men's Competitions ==
=== 2020 NPL Tasmania ===
The 2020 National Premier Leagues Tasmania was the eighth season of the National Premier Leagues Tasmania, the top-tier men's association football competition in Tasmania. Following the postponement of football competitions during the COVID-19 pandemic in Australia, the season ran from 18 July to 24 October 2020. Eight clubs contested a shortened 14-round double round-robin, with each club playing every other club once at home and once away.

Devonport City won the championship without losing a match, recording 13 wins and one draw to finish with 40 points, nine ahead of runners-up Glenorchy Knights. It was Devonport's third consecutive NPL Tasmania title and fourth in five seasons.

The national National Premier Leagues finals series was cancelled in 2020 because of the pandemic, meaning Devonport did not progress to a national championship tournament. There was no separate Tasmanian NPL league finals series.

| Pos | Team | Pld | W | D | L | GF | GA | GD | Pts |
|---|---|---|---|---|---|---|---|---|---|
| 1 | Devonport City (C) | 14 | 13 | 1 | 0 | 28 | 9 | +19 | 40 |
| 2 | Glenorchy Knights | 14 | 10 | 1 | 3 | 37 | 13 | +24 | 31 |
| 3 | South Hobart | 14 | 7 | 2 | 5 | 30 | 24 | +6 | 23 |
| 4 | Kingborough Lions United | 14 | 6 | 3 | 5 | 26 | 34 | −8 | 21 |
| 5 | Olympia Warriors | 14 | 6 | 1 | 7 | 32 | 27 | +5 | 19 |
| 6 | Clarence Zebras | 14 | 4 | 2 | 8 | 20 | 32 | −12 | 14 |
| 7 | Riverside Olympic | 14 | 2 | 3 | 9 | 17 | 32 | −15 | 9 |
| 8 | Launceston City | 14 | 1 | 1 | 12 | 13 | 32 | −19 | 4 |

Source: GameDay and Walter Pless
Rules for classification: 1) Points; 2) Goal difference; 3) Goals scored
(C) Champions

=== 2020 Tasmanian Championships ===
==== 2020 Northern Championship ====
| Pos | Team | Pld | W | D | L | GF | GA | GD | Pts |
|---|---|---|---|---|---|---|---|---|---|
| 1 | Devonport City B (C) | 14 | 11 | 2 | 1 | 42 | 17 | +25 | 35 |
| 2 | Northern Rangers | 14 | 8 | 2 | 4 | 45 | 23 | +22 | 26 |
| 3 | Launceston United | 14 | 7 | 4 | 3 | 37 | 24 | +13 | 25 |
| 4 | Riverside Olympic B | 14 | 6 | 2 | 6 | 33 | 31 | +2 | 20 |
| 5 | Ulverstone SC | 14 | 5 | 3 | 6 | 32 | 35 | −3 | 18 |
| 6 | Launceston City B | 14 | 5 | 1 | 8 | 27 | 36 | −9 | 16 |
| 7 | Somerset FC | 14 | 3 | 3 | 8 | 21 | 40 | −19 | 12 |
| 8 | Burnie United | 14 | 2 | 1 | 11 | 16 | 47 | −31 | 7 |

Source: sportstg.com
Rules for classification: 1) points; 2) goal difference; 3) number of goals scored.
(C) Champions

==== 2020 Southern Championship ====
| Pos | Team | Pld | W | D | L | GF | GA | GD | Pts |
|---|---|---|---|---|---|---|---|---|---|
| 1 | Olympia Warriors B (C) | 16 | 11 | 2 | 3 | 36 | 17 | +19 | 35 |
| 2 | University of Tasmania | 16 | 11 | 1 | 4 | 58 | 21 | +37 | 34 |
| 3 | Hobart United | 16 | 10 | 1 | 5 | 42 | 30 | +12 | 31 |
| 4 | New Town Eagles | 16 | 9 | 3 | 4 | 30 | 27 | +3 | 30 |
| 5 | Taroona FC | 16 | 8 | 5 | 3 | 44 | 16 | +28 | 29 |
| 6 | South Hobart B | 16 | 9 | 0 | 7 | 38 | 32 | +6 | 27 |
| 7 | Clarence Zebras B | 16 | 6 | 3 | 7 | 27 | 37 | −10 | 21 |
| 8 | Beachside FC | 16 | 6 | 2 | 8 | 30 | 38 | −8 | 20 |
| 9 | Metro FC | 16 | 5 | 4 | 7 | 22 | 27 | −5 | 19 |
| 10 | Glenorchy Knights B | 16 | 4 | 4 | 8 | 26 | 40 | −14 | 16 |
| 11 | Kingborough Lions United B | 16 | 2 | 2 | 12 | 13 | 48 | −35 | 8 |
| 12 | South East United | 16 | 1 | 1 | 14 | 16 | 49 | −33 | 4 |

Source: sportstg.com
Rules for classification: 1) points; 2) goal difference; 3) number of goals scored.
(C) Champions

== Women's Competitions ==
=== 2020 Women's Super League ===
Women's Super League
- Season: 2020

The 2020 Women's Super League season is the fifth edition of the statewide Tasmanian women's soccer league.

| Pos | Team | Pld | W | D | L | GF | GA | GD | Pts | Qualification or relegation |
|---|---|---|---|---|---|---|---|---|---|---|
| 1 | Olympia FC Warriors (C) | 15 | 14 | 0 | 1 | 74 | 6 | +68 | 42 | |
| 2 | Clarence Zebras | 15 | 11 | 2 | 2 | 51 | 10 | +41 | 35 | |
| 3 | Kingborough Lions United | 15 | 6 | 1 | 8 | 31 | 54 | −23 | 19 | |
| 4 | South Hobart | 15 | 5 | 1 | 9 | 28 | 33 | −5 | 16 | |
| 5 | Ulverstone SC | 15 | 4 | 4 | 7 | 18 | 35 | −17 | 16 | Not offered a licence for the following season. |
| 6 | University of Tasmania | 15 | 0 | 2 | 13 | 12 | 76 | −64 | 2 | Withdrew at end of season. |

Source: sportstg.com
Rules for classification: 1) points; 2) goal difference; 3) number of goals scored.
(C) Champions

== Cup competitions ==
| Competition | Winners | Score | Runners-up |
|---|---|---|---|
| Milan Lakoseljac Cup | Glenorchy Knights | 2–1 | Olympia Warriors |
| Women's State Wide Cup | Clarence Zebras | 3–0 | Olympia Warriors |
| State Wide Social Vase | | – | |
