= 2022 Football Tasmania season =

Football Tasmania
- Season: 2022

The 2022 Football Tasmania season was the ninth season of soccer under the restructured format in Tasmania. The men's competitions consisted of three major divisions across the State.

== Men's Competitions ==
=== 2022 NPL Tasmania ===
The 2022 National Premier Leagues Tasmania was the 10th season of the National Premier Leagues Tasmania, the top-tier men's association football competition in Tasmania. The season began on 18 March and concluded on 10 September 2022. Eight clubs contested the competition, with each club playing 21 matches across three meetings with each opponent.

Devonport City won the league championship with 58 points, finishing 13 points ahead of runners-up South Hobart. Devonport recorded 19 wins, one draw and one loss, scoring 71 goals and conceding 11. No separate Tasmanian finals series was contested in 2022; a new finals series was introduced in 2023.

Pos	Team	Pld	W	D	L	GF	GA	GD	Pts
1	Devonport City (C)	21	19	1	1	71	11	+60	58
2	South Hobart	21	14	3	4	64	23	+41	45
3	Kingborough Lions United	21	13	2	6	53	32	+21	41
4	Glenorchy Knights	21	13	1	7	45	25	+20	40
5	Launceston City	21	9	2	10	34	44	−10	29
6	Clarence Zebras	21	5	2	14	35	52	−17	17
7	Olympia Warriors	21	3	0	18	21	69	−48	9
8	Riverside Olympic	21	1	3	17	12	79	−67	6

Source: GameDay and Walter Pless
Rules for classification: 1) Points; 2) Goal difference; 3) Goals scored
(C) Champions

=== 2022 Tasmanian Championships ===
==== 2022 Northern Championship ====
Pos	Team	Pld	W	D	L	GF	GA	GD	Pts
1	Northern Rangers (C)	21	16	1	4	70	22	+48	49
2	Launceston United	21	13	2	6	46	25	+21	41
3	Ulverstone SC	21	11	5	5	52	28	+24	38
4	Devonport City B	21	11	3	7	65	32	+33	36
5	Somerset FC	21	11	2	8	45	44	+1	35
6	Launceston City B	21	7	0	14	35	57	−22	21
7	Burnie United	21	5	3	13	35	59	−24	18
8	Riverside Olympic B	21	1	2	18	13	94	−81	5

Source: mygameday
Rules for classification: 1) points; 2) goal difference; 3) number of goals scored.
(C) Champions

==== 2022 Southern Championship ====
Pos	Team	Pld	W	D	L	GF	GA	GD	Pts
1	New Town Eagles (C)	22	20	1	1	85	22	+63	61
2	Taroona FC	22	15	4	3	75	26	+49	49
3	Hobart United	22	14	4	4	65	27	+38	46
4	University of Tasmania	22	11	6	5	63	35	+28	39
5	South Hobart B	22	12	1	9	63	35	+28	37
6	Glenorchy Knights B	22	12	1	9	76	53	+23	37
7	South East United	22	11	3	8	57	47	+10	36
8	Hobart City Beachside F.C.	22	8	2	12	34	35	−1	26
9	Clarence Zebras B	22	7	1	14	45	50	−5	22
10	Metro FC	22	5	0	17	23	82	−59	15
11	Olympia Warriors B	22	3	1	18	17	106	−89	10
12	Kingborough Lions United B	22	2	0	20	24	109	−85	6

Source: mygameday
Rules for classification: 1) points; 2) goal difference; 3) number of goals scored.
(C) Champions

== Women's Competitions ==
=== 2022 Women's Super League ===
Women's Super League
- Season: 2022

The 2022 Women's Super League season, known as the MyState Bank Women's Super League for sponsorship reasons, is the seventh edition of the statewide Tasmanian women's soccer league.

Pos	Team	Pld	W	D	L	GF	GA	GD	Pts
1	Launceston United (C)	18	15	1	2	62	23	+39	46
2	South Hobart	18	13	3	2	86	27	+59	42
3	Devonport City	18	12	2	4	84	24	+60	38
4	Clarence Zebras	18	10	2	6	81	34	+47	32
5	Kingborough Lions United	18	4	1	13	45	74	−29	13
6	Taroona	18	2	2	14	15	93	−78	8
7	Olympia FC Warriors	18	1	1	16	15	110	−95	4

Source: mygameday
Rules for classification: 1) points; 2) goal difference; 3) number of goals scored.
(C) Champions

== Cup competitions ==
Competition	Winners	Score	Runners-up
Milan Lakoseljac Cup	Devonport City	3–0	South Hobart
Women's State Wide Cup	Launceston United	3–1	Kingborough Lions United
State Wide Social Vase		–	

== Awards ==
The end of year awards were presented at MyState Bank Arena on 12 September 2022.

=== National Premier Leagues Tasmania ===
Award	Men's	Women's
Best & Fairest	Kobe Kemp (Kingborough Lions)	Jazmin White (Devonport Strikers)
Player's Player	Nick Morton (South Hobart)	Danielle Kannegiesser (Kingborough Lions)
Golden Boot	Roberto Fernandez Garrido (Devonport Strikers)	Jazmin White (Devonport Strikers)
Coach of the Year	Lino Sciulli (Launceston City)	Malcolm Gorrie (Devonport Strikers)
Golden Glove	Keegan Smith (Devonport Strikers)	Brooke Bennett (Devonport Strikers)
Rising Star	Curtis Miley (Clarence Zebras)	Elianna Diafokeris (Clarence Zebras)
Referee of the Year	Brenton Kopra	Alex Tween
