= Lightwood Park =

Association football venue in Kingston, Tasmania

- Interactive map of Lightwood Park
- Full name: Lightwood Park Soccer Ground
- Location: Kingston, Tasmania, Australia
- Coordinates: 42.9731°S 147.2875°E
- Owner: Kingborough Council
- Operator: Kingborough Council
- Capacity: 830
- Type: Soccer ground
- Surface: Grass
- Field shape: Rectangular

Construction
- Renovated: 2025

Tenant
- Kingborough Lions United FC

Lightwood Park Soccer Ground, also known by its sponsored name Kitchen Centre Park, is an association football venue located in the Kingborough Sports Precinct in Kingston, Tasmania, Australia. It is the home ground of Kingborough Lions United FC, which competes in the National Premier Leagues Tasmania.

The venue has undergone several stages of redevelopment since 2018, culminating in the opening of a new pavilion and grandstand in 2025.

== History ==
Lightwood Park forms part of the wider Kingborough Sports Precinct in Kingston. It has been progressively developed as the principal association football venue within the municipality and is managed by Kingborough Council.

The venue became the home of Kingborough Lions United FC following its establishment in 1998. As participation increased, the club and council developed a long-term master plan to expand the facilities.

== Redevelopment ==
The redevelopment of Lightwood Park has been undertaken in several stages since the late 2010s as part of the long-term development of the Kingborough Sports Precinct. Initial works included the construction of a new floodlit match ground suitable for National Premier Leagues Tasmania competition, completed in 2018, together with upgrades to additional playing fields within the precinct. These works formed Stage 1 of the club's master plan and were supported by the council.

Between 2022 and 2025, the venue underwent a major $6.53 million redevelopment delivered across three stages. The project included construction of a new pavilion incorporating eight changerooms, referee rooms, medical and equipment facilities, administration areas, a community function space, an 830-seat covered grandstand, upgraded floodlighting and reconstruction of the main playing surface.

== Events ==
Lightwood Park is the home ground of Kingborough Lions United FC, an association football club. The club effectively has a year-round tenancy agreement for the site. The club fields teams from junior through to senior level and competes in the National Premier Leagues Tasmania and Women's Super League Tasmania competitions.

National tier events hosted, or scheduled to be hosted, at the ground include:

Date	Teams	Competition	Ref
10 September 2019	South Hobart FC v Central Coast Mariners FC	Pre-season friendly	
16 July 2026	Kingborough Lions United FC v Melbourne Victory FC	2026 Australia Cup	

== External link ==
- Lightwood Park at Austadiums
