= 2021 Football Tasmania season =

Football Tasmania
- Season: 2021

The 2021 Football Tasmania season was the eighth season of soccer under the restructured format in Tasmania. The men's competitions consisted of three major divisions across the State.

== Men's Competitions ==
=== 2021 NPL Tasmania ===
{{#ifeq:yes|yes| The 2021 National Premier Leagues Tasmania was the ninth season of the National Premier Leagues Tasmania, the top-tier men's association football competition in Tasmania. The season began on 20 March and concluded on 11 September 2021. Eight clubs contested the competition, with each club playing 21 matches across three meetings with each opponent.

Glenorchy Knights won the league championship with 50 points, finishing three points ahead of runners-up Devonport City. The title was decided on the final day: Glenorchy defeated Launceston City 1–0, while Devonport lost 2–1 away to Kingborough Lions United.

No Tasmanian league finals series was played. Glenorchy's league title would normally have qualified the club for the national National Premier Leagues finals series, but the national tournament was not held in 2021 due to the COVID-19 pandemic.

Pos	Team	Pld	W	D	L	GF	GA	GD	Pts
1	Glenorchy Knights (C)	21	15	5	1	52	16	+36	50
2	Devonport City	21	15	2	4	54	15	+39	47
3	South Hobart	21	13	4	4	58	24	+34	43
4	Kingborough Lions United	21	11	3	7	42	37	+5	36
5	Launceston City	21	7	1	13	26	48	−22	22
6	Olympia Warriors	21	5	3	13	29	46	−17	18
7	Clarence Zebras	21	5	3	13	33	55	−22	18
8	Riverside Olympic	21	1	3	17	29	82	−53	6

Source: GameDay and RSSSF
Rules for classification: 1) Points; 2) Goal difference; 3) Goals scored
(C) Champions

=== 2021 Tasmanian Championships ===
==== 2021 Northern Championship ====
Pos	Team	Pld	W	D	L	GF	GA	GD	Pts
1	Somerset FC (C)	21	16	1	4	76	37	+39	49
2	Devonport City B	21	15	3	3	79	32	+47	48
3	Launceston United	21	8	6	7	35	38	−3	30
4	Ulverstone SC	21	7	6	8	44	48	−4	27
5	Burnie United	21	7	4	10	43	52	−9	25
6	Northern Rangers	21	6	4	11	40	44	−4	22
7	Riverside Olympic B	21	5	3	13	37	61	−24	18
8	Launceston City B	21	5	3	13	27	69	−42	18

Source: mygameday
Rules for classification: 1) points; 2) goal difference; 3) number of goals scored.
(C) Champions

==== 2021 Southern Championship ====
Pos	Team	Pld	W	D	L	GF	GA	GD	Pts
1	New Town Eagles (C)	22	18	2	2	79	26	+53	56
2	South Hobart B	22	15	2	5	71	33	+38	47
3	University of Tasmania	22	14	4	4	59	28	+31	46
4	Hobart United	22	11	5	6	50	37	+13	38
5	Taroona FC	22	11	3	8	45	37	+8	36
6	Beachside FC	22	9	5	8	44	33	+11	32
7	Olympia Warriors B	22	9	4	9	57	66	−9	31
8	Glenorchy Knights B	22	8	5	9	46	52	−6	29
9	Kingborough Lions United B	22	7	1	14	34	54	−20	22
10	Metro FC	22	5	3	14	36	62	−26	18
11	South East United	22	3	3	16	23	67	−44	12
12	Clarence Zebras B	22	3	1	18	17	66	−49	10

Source: mygameday
Rules for classification: 1) points; 2) goal difference; 3) number of goals scored.
(C) Champions

== Women's Competitions ==
=== 2021 Women's Super League ===
Women's Super League
- Season: 2021
- Dates: March 20 - September 11
- Champions: Clarence Zebras
- Matches: 63
- Goals: 278 (4.41 per match)
- Top goalscorer: Zoe Nichols (24) (Clarence Zebras)

The 2021 Women's Super League season is the sixth edition of the statewide Tasmanian women's soccer league. The league expanded to seven teams this season, with the addition of three new teams (Devonport, Launceston United and Taroona), while University of Tasmania SC elected not to return and Ulverstone SC were not offered a licence.

Pos	Team	Pld	W	D	L	GF	GA	GD	Pts
1	Clarence Zebras (C)	18	16	1	1	76	27	+49	49
2	Launceston United	18	9	0	9	34	29	+5	27
3	Kingborough Lions United	18	6	7	5	48	44	+4	25
4	Olympia FC Warriors	18	7	4	7	36	34	+2	25
5	Devonport City	18	7	3	8	42	48	−6	24
6	South Hobart	18	3	5	10	24	42	−18	14
7	Taroona	18	3	4	11	18	54	−36	13

Source: mygameday
Rules for classification: 1) points; 2) goal difference; 3) number of goals scored.
(C) Champions

== Cup competitions ==
Competition	Winners	Score	Runners-up
Milan Lakoseljac Cup	Devonport City	2 (4)–2 (3)	Glenorchy Knights
Women's State Wide Cup	Olympia FC Warriors	3–1	Launceston United
State Wide Social Vase		–	
