= Andy Brennan =

Australian footballer (born 1993)

Personal information
- Date of birth: 1 April 1993 (age 33)
- Place of birth: Hobart, Tasmania, Australia
- Positions: Winger; striker

Team information
- Current team: Bayside Argonauts
- Number: 10

Youth career
- South Hobart

Senior career*
Years	Team	Apps	(Gls)
2010–2012	South Hobart		(56)
2013	Bentleigh Greens	0	(0)
2014	South Hobart	21	(25)
2015	South Melbourne	15	(4)
2015–2017	Newcastle Jets	5	(0)
2017	Bentleigh Greens	27	(5)
2018	South Melbourne	11	(2)
2018	Oakleigh Cannons	15	(4)
2019	Green Gully	18	(2)
2020	Hume City	5	(0)
2020	South Hobart	10	(0)
2021	Hume City	17	(4)
2022–2025	South Melbourne	93	(4)
2026-	Bayside Argonauts	1	(0)
- * Club domestic league appearances and goals as of 30 January 2026

Andrew Brennan (born 1 April 1993) is an Australian professional soccer player who plays as a winger or striker for Bayside Argonauts.

In May 2019, Brennan came out as gay, becoming the first openly gay Australian male footballer.

== Career ==
Brennan joined the Newcastle Jets on 29 April 2015 from National Premier League side South Melbourne, signing a two-year deal. Due largely to ongoing injury problems, Brennan was forced to wait until 26 March 2016 to make his A-League debut against Perth Glory, replacing Mitch Cooper in a 2–1 loss. Brennan went on to make a total of three appearances in his maiden A-League season, all off the substitutes' bench.

On 19 January 2017, it was announced that Brennan had parted with the Jets by mutual consent. He made a total of five A-league appearances during his time with the Jets. He then returned to Bentleigh Greens SC in the Victorian Premier League.

In November 2018, Brennan signed with Green Gully of the NPL Victoria League.

== Personal life ==
In an interview with the Herald Sun, Brennan came out as gay. He had previously dated women, but had been unsure of his sexuality for years, stating that it had been a "mental burden". Brennan is the first male Australian footballer to come out as gay, and one of only a few openly gay players playing professionally.
