= Renato De Vecchi =

Brazilian footballer

Personal information
- Full name: Renato Bueno de Vecchi Marins
- Date of birth: 7 February 1989
- Place of birth: Brazil
- Positions: Winger; forward

Senior career*
Years	Team	Apps	(Gls)
-2008	Brasilis Futebol Clube		
2009-2010	Associação Desportiva São Caetano	3	(0)
2011	Esporte Clube São Bento	2	(0)
2012	Rio Claro Futebol Clube	4	(3)
2013	Grêmio Barueri Futebol	4	(0)
2013-2014	NK Mosor		
2015	Skive IK		
2016	Thisted FC	13	(2)
2017	Glenavon	6	(0)
2017	Gällivare Malmbergets FF	4	(1)
2018	South Hobart FC	18	(11)
2019	Lillehammer FK	2	(0)
- * Club domestic league appearances and goals

Renato Bueno de Vecchi Marins (born 7 February 1989 in Brazil), sometimes known as Nirvana, is a Brazilian footballer.

== Career ==
De Vecchi started his career with Brasilis Futebol Clube. In 2009, he signed for Associação Desportiva São Caetano. In 2012, he signed for Rio Claro Futebol Clube. In 2016, De Vecchi signed for Thisted FC. In 2017, De Vecchi signed for Glenavon F.C. In 2018, hesigned for South Hobart FC. In 2019, he signed for Lillehammer FK.
