= South East United FC =

Australian soccer club

South East United
- Full name: South East United Football Club
- Founded: 2013
- Ground: Pembroke Park, Sorell
- League: NPL Tasmania
- 2026: 7th of 10
- Website: https://www.seufc.org.au

South East United FC is an Australian football club based in Sorell, Tasmania, currently plays in the second tier National Premier Leagues Tasmania.

== Club information ==
South East United was formed in 2013 at a meeting of representatives from Dodges Ferry Junior Soccer Club, Richmond United, Cambridge United, Peninsula Pirates, Football Federation Tasmania, Eastern Region Junior Soccer Association, Sorell Council, Pembroke Park Management Committee, and Sorell Community Bank. The club plays at Pembroke Park.

The club fields junior and senior teams in Football Federation Tasmania competitions. The senior men’s side competed in the third tier, the Southern Championship, through the 2025 season.

In September 2025, Football Tasmania announced that South East United and Ulverstone had been accepted into the National Premier Leagues Tasmania for the 2026 season.

== Seasons - Men ==
Season	League									
Season	Name (national level)	Pld	W	D	L	GF	GA	GD	Pts	Position
2019	Southern Championship (3)	21	1	0	20	13	131	-118	3	8th (8)
2020	Southern Championship (3)	16	1	1	14	16	49	-33	4	12th (12)
2021	Southern Championship (3)	22	3	3	16	23	67	-44	12	11th (12)
2022	Southern Championship (3)	22	11	3	8	57	47	+10	36	7th (12)
2023	Southern Championship (3)	16	10	1	5	73	53	+20	31	2nd (9)
2024	Southern Championship (3)	21	18	2	1	104	22	+82	56	1st (10)

== Honours ==
- Southern Premierships:
  - Winners (2): 2024 & 2025
