= Kingborough Lions United FC =

Semi-professional association football club in Tasmania

- Full name: Kingborough Lions United Football Club
- Nickname: The Lions
- Founded: 1998
- Ground: Lightwood Park
- Capacity: 3,000
- Chairman: Brian Downes
- Manager: Jon Fenech
- League: NPL Tasmania
- 2025: 3rd of 8
- Website: http://klufc.org.au/
Home colours

Kingborough Lions United Football Club is a semi-professional association football club based in Kingston, Tasmania. Founded in 1998, the club currently competes many leagues including in the NPL Tasmania and the Women's Super League. The club has a large playing group ranging and teams range from juniors, youth academy, and social teams through to high performance men and women's programs.

== History ==
Kingborough Lions has a complicated history having been formed out of several mergers of former clubs in the Hobart region. The club in its current form was formed after a merger between Kingborough United and West Hobart Lions in 1998.

Kingborough United were a long standing southern-based Premier League team and was the result of the previous mergers of Kingston Cannons and Rapid Hobart. The club's original home ground was the Sherburd Park Complex, which it shared with the Blackmans Bay District Cricket Club. In 1996, the club moved to the then Tasmanian Baseball Complex (Now known as the Lightwood Park Complex), taking up a long term tenancy and they shared the facilities with the Kingston Crows Cricket Club.

Caledonian Soccer Club (West Hobart Lions) was already a unified side formed out of a smaller West Hobart club, and the previously largely successful side of "Caledonians" who were a powerhouse club in the 1950s, but had since faded. The side was relatively nomadic in existence with no permanent facilities, but training was generally undertaken at the West Hobart Oval. Caledonian Soccer Club was forced to change their name in 1994 after an edict from the newly formed Soccer Australia mandated clubs could not use ethnic connotations in club names.

In 2010, the club began operating under the updated name of Kingborough Lions United Football Club, and in 2012 a new logo was designed and presented on all playing strips.

As a result, Kingborough Lions are the inheritors of the traditions of these four clubs, and have now become a large club based in the municipality of Kingborough. Although relatively unsuccessful in their senior programs since merging, the club has the foundations in place to be a successful club due to the large player catchment area, and is the only club in the Southern region of Hobart with a high performance Men and Women's program.

In 2026, the club won the statewide Lakoseljac Cup for the first time in their history, advancing to the Australia Cup Round of 32, where they drew Melbourne Victory.

== Players ==
=== Current Squad - Men ===
Note: Known players.

No.	Pos.	Nation	Player
1.	GK	AUS	Nick O'Connell
2.	MF	AUS	Eli Wright
3.	DF	AUS	Ryan Cook
4.	MF	AUS	Bagat Beyong
5.	DF	FIJ	Peter Ravai
6.	DF	AUS	Hugo Schwarz
7.	FW	CAN	Joel Badger
9.	FW	AUS	Noah Mies
10.	DF	AUS	Eli Luttmer
11.	FW	AUS	Solomon Tebeje
14.	FW	AUS	Rowan Pitt
15.	DF	AUS	Joe McShane
16.	MF	COL	Esteban Miranda
17.	DF	AUS	Owen Verdouw
19.	FW	AUS	Tristen Galt
20.	MF	AUS	Bradley Lakoseljac
24.	MF	AUS	Greg Downes
31.	GK	AUS	Lochie Schofield

== Coaching Staff - Men ==
Note: Known Staff.

NPL Head Coach	NPL Assistant Coach	NPL Assistant Coach	NPL GK Coach	NPL S&C Coach	NPL U21 Head Coach
Jon Fenech	Michael Simonyi	Nick Atwell	Alex Tatnell	Sam Rossetto	Diego Atterbury

== Recent Seasons - Men ==
Season	League												Statewide Cup	FFA Cup
Season	Name (national level)	Pld	W	D	L	GF	GA	GD	Pts	Position	Tasmanian Finals	NPL Finals	Statewide Cup	FFA Cup
2012	Southern Premier League (2)	21	8	6	7	47	45	2	30	4th	Quarter-finals	Did not exist	Quarter-finals	N/A
2013	Victory League (2)	21	6	5	10	40	55	−15	23	6th	DNQ	DNQ	Round of 16	N/A
2014	Victory League (2)	21	5	1	15	35	84	−49	16	6th	DNQ	DNQ	Semi-finals	DNQ
2015	Victory League (2)	21	7	2	12	37	60	−23	23	6th	Quarter-finals	DNQ	Runners-up	DNQ
2016	NPL Tasmania (2)	21	6	3	12	34	53	−19	21	6th	Semi-finals	DNQ	Quarter-finals	DNQ
2017	NPL Tasmania (2)	21	2	5	14	16	64	−48	11	8th	DNQ	DNQ	Round of 16	DNQ
2018	NPL Tasmania (2)	21	4	3	14	35	54	−19	15	7th	Not held	DNQ	Round of 16	DNQ
2019	NPL Tasmania (2)	24	9	3	12	43	50	−7	30	6th	Not held	DNQ	Round of 16	DNQ
2020	NPL Tasmania (2)	14	6	3	5	26	34	-8	21	4th	Not held	Cancelled	Quarter-finals	Cancelled
2021	NPL Tasmania (2)	21	11	3	7	42	37	5	36	4th	Not held	Cancelled	Quarter-finals	DNQ
2022	NPL Tasmania (2)	21	13	2	6	53	32	21	41	3rd	Not held	Not held	Semi-finals	DNQ
2023	NPL Tasmania (2)	21	13	0	8	70	40	30	39	4th	Semi-finals	Not held	Quarter-finals	DNQ
2024	NPL Tasmania (2)	21	11	3	7	66	43	23	36	4th	Not held	Not held	Runners-up	DNQ
2025	NPL Tasmania (2)	21	13	2	6	45	33	12	41	3rd	Not held	Not held	Quarter-finals	DNQ

Ref:

== Current Squad - Women ==
Note: Known players.

No.	Pos.	Nation	Player
1.	GK	AUS	Josie Rose
2.	DM	AUS	Lucy Page
3.	FW	KOR	Min-Hee Kim
4.	DF	AUS	Maddie Black
5.	FW	AUS	Enya Anderson
6.	FW	AUS	Amy Ollington
7.	MF	AUS	Emelia Howell
8.	MF	UK	Hannah Walsh
9.	MF	AUS	Christabelle Moore
10.	FW	UK	Tilly Wills
11.	DF	AUS	Teigan Hennessy
12.	MF	KOR	Hae-Eun Kim
13.	DF	AUS	Eloise Paine
14.	FW	KOR	So-Young Lee
15.	DF	AUS	Anna Fewkes
16.	DF	AUS	Saskie Ashby
17.	FW	AUS	Cara Lashmar
18.	DF	AUS	Jorja Edwards
19.	FW	AUS	Greta Crevatin-Gunn
20.	FW	AUS	Talara Lawson
21.	GK	AUS	Kiera Kingston
22.	DF	AUS	Hannah Kull
23.	DF	AUS	Emily Hughes

== Coaching Staff - Women ==
Note: Known Staff.

WSL Head Coach:	WSL Assistant Coach	WSL GK Coach	WSL S&C Coach	WSL18 Head Coach
Simon Edwards	Douglas Ollington	Masatoshi Kawano	Nick Atwell	Adam Coleman

== Recent Seasons - Women ==
Season	League										Statewide Cup
Season	Name	Pld	W	D	L	GF	GA	GD	Pts	Position	Statewide Cup
2016	Southern Championship Women	20	1	0	19	12	110	-98	3	6th	Did not exist
2017	Women's Southern Championship	20	8	1	11	39	54	-11	25	4th	Round of 16
2018	VETO Women's Southern Championship	21	12	3	6	64	31	33	39	3rd	Final
2019	Women's Super League	20	9	0	11	57	43	14	27	4th	Final

== Honours ==
- State Championships: 7 times (as "Caledonians", 1953,1955,1956,1957,1958,1960,1981); 5 times (as "Rapid", 1964,1976,1979,1980,1982)
- State Championship Runners-up: 1 time (as "Rapid" 1961)
- Southern Premierships: 6 times (as "Caledonians", 1953,1955,1956,1957,1958,1960); 4 times (as "Rapid",1961,1964,1976,1982); 1 time (as "Lions" 1999)
- Tasmanian football cups: 2 times (as "Caledonians", 1965,1973); 4 times (as "Rapid",1974,1979,1980,1984); 1 time (as "Lions" 2026)
