= Launceston United SC =

- Full name: Launceston United Soccer Club
- Nicknames: United, The Lions
- Founded: 1958
- Ground: Birch Avenue Soccer Grounds
- Capacity: 1500
- Chairman: Daniel Manshanden
- Coach: Gediminas Kruša
- League: NPL Tasmania
- 2025: 9th of 10
- Website: http://www.launcestonunited.com.au

Launceston United Soccer Club, is a semi-professional soccer club that represents the city of Launceston in the National Premier Leagues Tasmania. It should not be mistaken with the fellow Launceston team, Launceston City. The club fields teams in all junior NTJSA (Northern Tasmanian Junior Soccer Association) divisions. The senior club consists of the Senior Men's National Premier Leagues Tasmania team (first team), Women's Super League Team, Men's Northern Championship League 1 reserve team, Men's Northern Championship Under 18's team, Northern Championship League 2 team (social League) as well as women's teams.

The club has over 500 registered players in senior and junior competitions.

Launceston United play their home games at Floorworld Park, in Launceston, Tasmania. The club's home ground is located in the suburb of Newstead. The Complex features two full-size FIFA playing fields and floodlights for night matches and training sessions.

Launceston United Soccer Club was formed in 1958 and merged with "Launceston Matric" under the name of "Launceston Soccer & Sports Club" in 1989. Matric was promoted to the Tasmanian State League from the Northern Premier League for the 1988 season and Merged with Launceston United the following season. However, they only lasted two seasons in the top flight before withdrawing in 1990 back to the Northern Premier League.

Launceston United reverted to their original name in 2008.

The home playing kit of Launceston United is Royal Blue and White, and the away kit is either green or white. The home kit is very distinctive and features a Royal Blue jersey, Royal Blue shorts and Royal Blue or White socks.

For sponsorship reasons, the NPL Men's home and away kits are sponsored by Jackson Volkswagen. The WSL Women's Team is sponsored by Launceston Floorworld.

The club theme song is 'Boys/Girls of Launnie' and is sung by the club's senior teams in the change rooms after a victory.

The club motto is Esse Quam Videri, which is a Latin phrase meaning "To be, rather than to seem".

Launceston United 50th Anniversary Club Emblem with motto Esse Quam Videri

== Women's Senior Team ==
In 2020 Launceston United SC won the bid to enter into the statewide Women's Super League, after the squad won the 2020 Women's Northern Championship League title with the club.

As of 2021 the inaugural Launceston United SC WSL Squad consists of:

- Katie Hill (C)
- Dani Gunton (VC)
- Nichola Clark
- Laura Dickinson
- Madi Gilpin
- Jess Robinson
- Jess McCullum-smith
- Abigail Thomas
- Amy Littlechild
- Annika Reitsema
- Elodie Gray
- Gonya Luate
- Imogen Mccormick (GK)
- Isabella Duff
- Isobel Cootes
- Karla Jones
- Madeline Lohse
- Sofie Verhaegen
- Sydney Carnie (GK)
- Tahlia Vanderheide
- Tess Klower

== New clubrooms ==
On Saturday, 1 August 2015, Club President Tony Pearce and Michael Ferguson MHA officially opened the new Launceston United clubrooms. The opening was the culmination of a seven-year journey of development applications with the Launceston City Council, grants applications with the Tasmanian Government's Sports and Recreation Department, Football Federation Australia (FFA) and many club fundraising events. The club needed to replace the older, out of date existing clubroom building that had been in service since 1965, to more modern facilities. The new clubrooms feature four changing rooms catering for home and away teams, two separate player shower and toilet block facilities adjacent to the change rooms, referee room, club house facilities for functions, and a fully serviced bar and canteen.

Michael and Tony jointly opened the state of the art building for the present and future generations of the Launceston United Soccer Club and the community of Launceston. The new clubrooms are advanced soccer facilities in Tasmania and adequately reflect the size of the club, once being the largest in Tasmania with over 800 players.

== Senior Men's Team ==
In 2022 Launceston United SC won the bid to enter into the statewide National Premier League, after the squad came 2nd place in the 2022 Northern Championship with the club.

This is the team that came 2nd in the Northern Championship in 2022

- Aidan Rigby (C)
- Aaron Gunsar
- Americo Arguelles
- Andrew Smith
- Casey Summers
- Christian Byard
- Christopher Pickering
- Connor Reading
- Greg Duffy (GK)
- Jarrod Grossman
- Mitch Lockhart
- Oliver Jacobs
- Oscar Scharapow (GK)
- Reede Beckett
- Samuel Lowe (VC)
- Samuel Quinn
- Sebastian Gardiner
- Thomas Doonan
- Tom Mctigue
- Will Spicer
- Yousef Mohammad

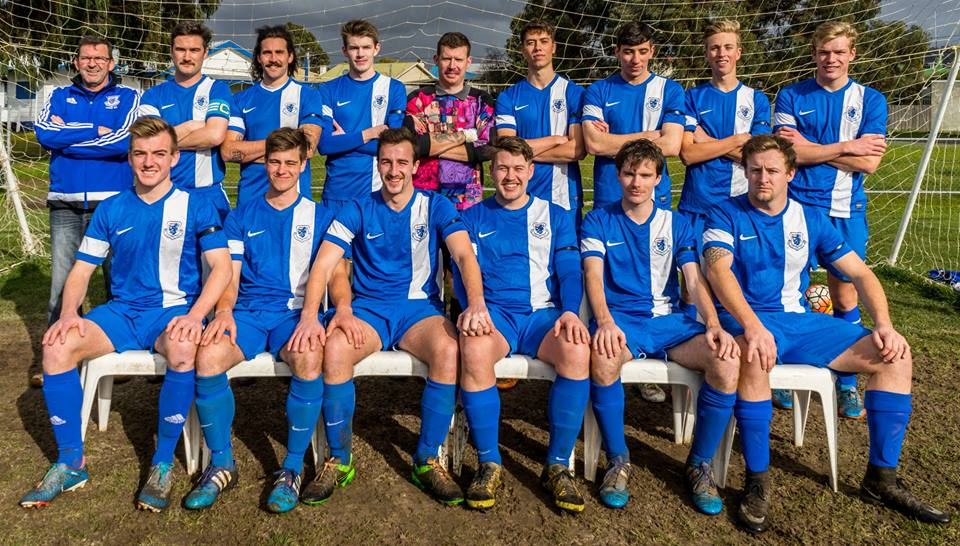
2016 Northern Championship Senior Men's team

2016 Northern Championship Senior men's first team pictured above

== Honours ==
- State Championships: Once (1967)
- State Championships Runners-up: Once (1964)
- Northern Premierships: 3 Times (1964, 1967, 1993)
- Steve Hudson Cup 2 times (1995, 2015)
- Women’s Super League Once (2022)
- Women’s Statewide Cup Once (2022)

== Notable past players and coaches ==
- Brad Green
- Ken Morton

== Seasons ==
Season	League											Lakoseljac Cup	Australia Cup
Season	Name	Pld	W	D	L	GF	GA	GD	Pts	Position	Tasmanian Finals	Lakoseljac Cup	Australia Cup
2012	North Premier League (2)	16	5	2	9	33	43	−10	17	7th	DNQ	RO16	Did not exist
2013	Northern Premier League (3)	16	0	0	16	8	71	−63	0	9th	DNQ	Qualifying Round	Did not exist
2014	Northern Premier League (3)	16	3	2	11	21	63	−42	11	8th	DNQ	Did not enter	DNQ
2015	Northern Premier League (3)	21	11	4	6	44	31	13	37	3rd	DNQ	Did not enter	DNQ
2016	Northern Premier League (3)	21	11	2	8	51	47	4	35	4th	DNQ	RO16	DNQ
2017	Northern Premier League (3)	21	10	1	10	60	47	13	31	3rd	DNQ	RO16	DNQ
2018	Northern Premier League (3)	16	2	3	11	21	43	-22	9	9th	DNQ	Qualifying Round	DNQ
2019	Northern Championship (2)	21	14	0	7	69	30	39	42	3rd	DNQ	Qualifying Round	DNQ
2020	Northern Championship (2)	14	7	4	3	37	24	13	25	3rd	DNQ	RO16	DNQ
2021	Northern Championship (2)	21	8	6	7	35	38	-3	30	3rd	DNQ	Did not enter	DNQ
2022	Northern Championship (2)	21	13	2	6	46	25	21	41	2nd	DNQ	RO16	DNQ
2023	National Premier League (1)	21	0	2	19	18	91	-73	2	8th	DNQ	RO16	DNQ
