= Clarence Zebras FC =

Australian soccer club

Clarence Zebras
- Full name: Clarence Zebras Football Club
- Founded: 2019
- Ground: Wentworth Park, Howrah
- Capacity: 5,500
- Presidents: Ronnie Bolton, Nick Di Giovanni
- Manager: Brian Murphy
- League: NPL Tasmania
- 2025: 8th of 8
- Website: https://www.clarencezebrasfc.com/

Clarence Zebras Football Club is a soccer club based in the City of Clarence, Tasmania, which was formed in September of 2019 as a result of the amalgamation of Clarence United FC and Hobart Zebras FC. They compete in the NPL Tasmania, the second tier of the sport in the country. The club also has women's teams, including in the highest division in Tasmania, the Women's Super League, and in all youth divisions. Clarence Zebras play their home games at Wentworth Park, a multiple pitch venue located alongside Howrah Beach.

== Coaching staff (2026) ==
- Head coach: Brian Murphy
- Assistant coach: Franco Previdi
- Analyst: Cameron Chladil
- Goalkeeper coach: Neil Connell
- Under 21 head coach: Matthew Hope

== Seasons (men) ==
Season	League												Statewide Cup	FFA Cup
Season	Name (national level)	Pld	W	D	L	GF	GA	GD	Pts	Position	Tasmanian Finals	NPL Finals	Statewide Cup	FFA Cup
2020	NPL Tasmania (2)	14	4	2	8	20	32	-12	14	6th	Not held	Cancelled	Round of 16	Cancelled
2021	NPL Tasmania (2)	21	5	3	13	33	55	-22	18	7th	Not held	DNQ	Round of 16	DNQ
2022	NPL Tasmania (2)	21	5	2	14	35	52	-17	17	6th	Not held	DNQ	Round of 16	DNQ
2023	NPL Tasmania (2)	21	9	2	10	52	53	-1	29	5th	DNQ	DNQ	Semi Final	DNQ
2024	NPL Tasmania (2)	21	3	2	16	28	60	-30	11	7th	Not held	DNQ	Quarter-Final	DNQ
2025	NPL Tasmania (2)	21	1	1	19	19	83	-64	4	8th	Not held	DNQ	Quarter-Final	DNQ
