= South Hobart FC =

Football club in Hobart, Tasmania, Australia

South Hobart
- Full name: South Hobart Football Club
- Founded: 1910; 116 years ago
- Ground: South Hobart Oval
- Capacity: 4,500
- Coach: Ken Morton
- League: NPL Tasmania
- 2026: 1st of 10, (premiers, champions)
- Website: http://southhobartfc.com/
Home colours

South Hobart Football Club is an Australian soccer club based in Hobart, Tasmania. Founded in 1910, the club currently competes in the NPL Tasmania before transition to Australian Championship. South Hobart plays home games at South Hobart Ground and also fields teams in all junior divisions, as well as women's teams.

South Hobart has a continuing reputation for identifying quality youth players and involving them in the first team. Former Newcastle Jets forward Andy Brennan is a feature of this youth academy.

== History ==
South Hobart is the oldest soccer club in Tasmania and the most successful.

They played their first match on 21 May 1910. South Hobart won the league for the first time in 1919, and won the next four in a row. Although successful throughout their existence, they have only recently begun to again win trophies at the highest level. The 60s saw the influx of ethnic based clubs, and South Hobart has taken until the 21st century to return to their former glory.

Celebrating their centenary in 2010, the club achieved a clean sweep across Tasmanian soccer, finishing first in the Southern Premier League, winning the Championship play-off along with the Statewide Cup, Summer Cup and Steve Hudson Cup. They retained all these titles in 2011.

With the creation of the National Premier Leagues as the official second tier of Australian soccer for 2013, South Hobart finished in first place in Tasmanian division and won the regional championship playoffs. Progressing the Final series they defeated Campbelltown City SC of South Australia in the semi-final. Taking on one of Australia's most famous and successful former NSL sides Sydney United 58 FC they were defeated 2–0 in the inaugural Grand Final.

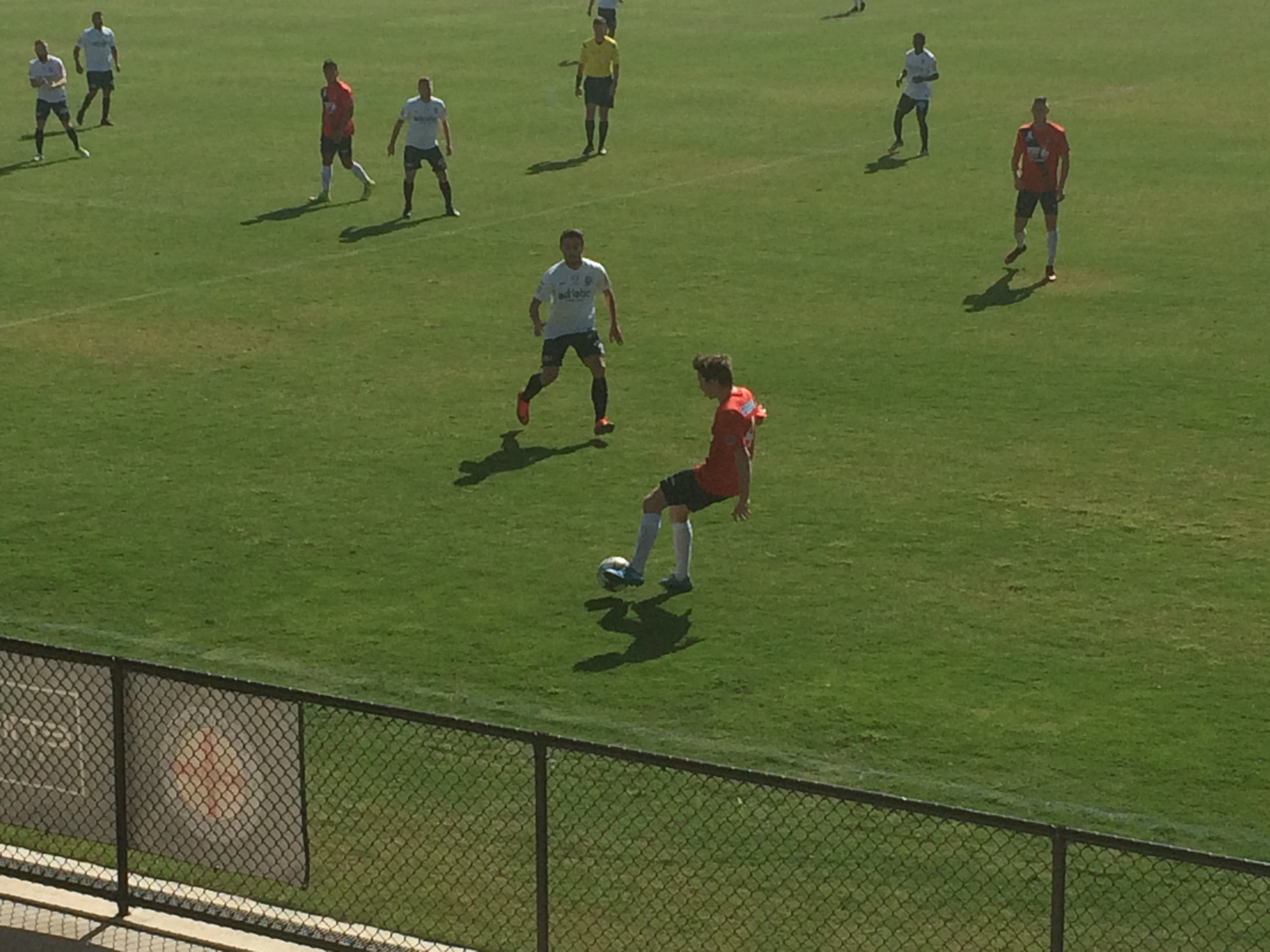
Pascoe Vale vs South Hobart in a friendly away at CB Smith Reserve on 17 December 2016

2013 saw Kostas Kanakaris score the fastest hat-trick in Australian soccer when he scored three goals in almost 3 minutes against Launcestion City in the highest scoring match of that time. In 2014 South Hobart became the first Tasmanian side to qualify for the FFA Cup. The club was drawn against Tuggeranong United in the round of 32, though lost the match 4–5 on penalties after 1–1 result after extra-time. They competed in the 2015 edition as they went down in penalties again, this time to Sydney United 58.

In 2025, they competed in the inaugural 2025 Australian Championship after becoming Tasmanian Premiers in the regular season. and also compete again in 2026 Australian Championship after winning two in a row as Tasmanian Premiers in NPL Tasmania.

== Players ==
=== Current squad ===
As of 8 October 2025

Note: Flags indicate national team as defined under FIFA eligibility rules; some limited exceptions apply. Players may hold more than one non-FIFA nationality.

No.	Pos.	Nation	Player
1	GK	AUS	Nicholas O'Connell
3	DF	AUS	Adam Gorrie
5	DF	JPN	Musashi Kokubo
6	DF	AUS	Jacob Lancaster
7	MF	AUS	Samuel Berezansky
8	MF	AUS	Kobe Kemp
9	MF	AUS	Bradley Lakoseljac
10	MF	AUS	Nicholas Morton
99	FW	SWE	Alexander Eliasson
12	MF	AUS	Oliver White
13	DF	AUS	Reilly Morton

No.	Pos.	Nation	Player
14	FW	AUS	Harrison Oates
15	FW	AUS	Daniel Arnaiz
16	FW	AUS	Patrick Both
17	FW	AUS	Alex Walter
18	DF	AUS	Eli Wright
19	DF	AUS	Tobias Herweynen
20	FW	AUS	Rex Maddock
21	FW	AUS	Kasper Hallam
22	GK	AUS	Kieran Brown
24	GK	AUS	Thomas Cordell
25	MF	AUS	Alfred Hess

== Notable former players ==
- (Poland) (Australia) Alex Cisak
- (Australia) Andy Brennan
- (United States) Anthony Legendre
- (England) (Australia) Joseph H Honeysett
- (Brazil) Renato De Vecchi
- (Canada) Talia White

== Ground ==
South Hobart play their home games at South Hobart Ground, D'Arcy Street, South Hobart. The ground is a picturesque ground at the base of the slopes of Mount Wellington with sweeping views over the city and the River Derwent.

The ground was a point of significant controversy between the club and local dog walkers about a proposed ban at ground.

The club's headquarters however and training ground are located nearby at Wellesley Park, Wellesley Street, South Hobart, where dogs are still welcome.

== Records ==
As the most successful and oldest currently existing club in Tasmania the club holds a number of records. Some of these include the longest unbeaten run in Tasmanian soccer – 63 games without defeat, the most state championships won and also the record for fastest hat-trick in Australian history when Kostas Kanakaris scored three in two minutes and 51 seconds in part of an 11–0 thrashing of Launceston City on 12 May 2013.

== Seasons - Men ==
Season	League												Statewide Cup	FFA Cup	Summer Cup/Summer Series
Season	Name (national level)	Pld	W	D	L	GF	GA	GD	Pts	Position	Tasmanian Finals	NPL Finals/Aus Champ Final Series	Statewide Cup	FFA Cup	Summer Cup/Summer Series
1996	State League (2)	18	6	2	10	35	47	−12	20	7th	DNQ	Not yet founded	?	Not yet founded	?
1997	State League (2)	18	7	3	8	39	47	−8	24	6th	DNQ	Not yet founded	Semi-final	Not yet founded	Runners-up
1998	State League (2)	18	7	1	10	36	40	−4	22	6th	DNQ	Not yet founded	Not contested	Not yet founded	Runners-up
1999	State League (2)	16	5	0	11	31	46	−15	15	7th	DNQ	Not yet founded	Not contested	Not yet founded	Fourth place
2000	South Conference (2)	16	2	1	13	22	41	−19	7	9th	Not contested	Not yet founded	Quarter-final	Not yet founded	Group stage
2001	South Premier League (2)	18	11	4	3	52	22	30	37	2nd	DNQ	Not yet founded	-	Not yet founded	Winners
2002	South Premier League (2)	18	14	2	2	51	17	34	44	1st	Champions	Not yet founded	Semi-final	Not yet founded	Semi-final
2003	South Premier League (2)	18	9	3	6	40	20	20	30	4th	DNQ	Not yet founded	Quarter-final	Not yet founded	Runners-up
2004	South Premier League (2)	16	6	3	7	29	28	1	21	6th	DNQ	Not yet founded	First round	Not yet founded	Winners
2005	South Premier League (2)	16	4	8	4	20	18	2	20	6th	DNQ	Not yet founded	Quarter-final	Not yet founded	Semi-final
2006	South Premier League (2)	18	11	1	6	44	27	17	34	3rd	DNQ	Not yet founded	Semi-final	Not yet founded	Group stage
2007	South Premier League (2)	18	13	4	1	59	14	42	43	2nd	DNQ	Not yet founded	Semi-final	Not yet founded	Group stage
2008	South Premier League (2)	18	14	2	2	56	13	43	44	1st	Champions	Not yet founded	Winners	Not yet founded	Runners-up
2009	South Premier League (2)	21	15	3	3	49	15	34	48	1st	Runners-up	Not yet founded	First round	Not yet founded	Group stage
2010	South Premier League (2)	21	18	3	0	61	15	46	57	1st	Champions	Not yet founded	Winners	Not yet founded	Winners
2011	South Premier League (2)	21	16	3	2	77	22	55	51	1st	Champions	Not yet founded	Winners	Not yet founded	Winners
2012	South Premier League (2)	21	16	2	3	62	15	47	50	1st	Champions	Not yet founded	Semi-final	Not yet founded	Semi-final
2013	Victory League (2)	21	18	2	1	79	25	54	56	1st	Champions	Runners-up	Quarter-final	Not yet founded	Semi-final
2014	Victory League (2)	21	18	1	2	89	18	71	55	1st	Champions	Quarter-final	Winners	Round of 32	Group stage
2015	Victory League (2)	21	15	1	5	73	27	46	46	2nd	Semi-final	DNQ	Winners	Round of 32	Semi-final
2016	NPL Tasmania (2)	21	15	3	3	87	21	66	48	3rd	Champions	DNQ	Runners-up	Preliminary R7	Winners
2017	NPL Tasmania (2)	21	18	1	2	87	19	68	55	1st	Champions	Quarter-final	Quarter-final	Preliminary R5	DNE
2018	NPL Tasmania (2)	21	15	2	4	63	32	31	47	2nd	Not held	DNQ	Runners-up	Preliminary R7	DSQ
2019	NPL Tasmania (2)	24	14	5	5	80	30	50	47	3rd	Not held	DNQ	Winners	Round of 32	
2020	NPL Tasmania (2)	14	7	2	5	30	24	+6	23	3rd	Not held	Cancelled	TBD	Cancelled	
2021	NPL Tasmania (2)	21	13	4	4	58	24	34	43	3rd	Cancelled				
2022	NPL Tasmania (2)	21	14	3	4	64	23	41	45						
2023	NPL Tasmania (2)	21	12	4	5	61	30	31	40	2nd	Not held	DNQ	Champions	Preliminary R7	DSQ
2024	NPL Tasmania (2)	21	14	5	2	58	29	29	47	2nd	Not held	DNQ	Cancelled	Preliminary R4	
2025	NPL Tasmania (2)	19	15	3	1	74	20	+54	48	1st	Not held	Cancelled	TBD	Round of 32	
2025	Australian Championship (2)	6							0		–		–		

== Honours ==
- State Champions:
  - Winners (19): 1919, 1920, 1921, 1922, 1923, 1929, 1937, 1946, 1947, 1948, 1959, 2002, 2008, 2010, 2011, 2012, 2013, 2014, 2017
  - 'Runners-up (4): 1926, 2009, 2015, 2018
- Milan Lakoseljac Memorial Trophy (Statewide Cup)
  - Winners (7): 2008, 2010, 2011, 2014, 2015, 2019, 2025
  - Runners-up (2): 2016, 2018
- National Premier Leagues Tasmania (NPL Tas Premiers)
  - Winners (5): 2013, 2014, 2017, 2025, 2026
  - Runners-up (2): 2015, 2018
- Victory Cup / NPL Tas League Cup (NPL Tas Finals)
  - Winners (6): 2013, 2014, 2016, 2017, 2023, 2026
- National Premier Leagues
  - Runners-up: 2013
- Southern Premierships
  - Winners (21): 1919, 1920, 1921, 1922, 1923, 1926, 1929, 1937, 1946, 1947, 1948, 1959, 1978, 1980, 1999, 2002, 2008, 2009, 2010, 2011, 2012
  - Runners-up (15): 1924, 1925, 1927, 1928, 1930, 1933, 1936, 1939, 1951, 1956, 1957, 1958, 1961, 2001, 2007
- KO Cup
  - Winners (11): 1927, 1928, 1930, 1931, 1932, 1938, 1946, 1949, 1950, 1951, 1955
  - Runners-up (8): 1929, 1933, 1936, 1937, 1954, 1956, 1957, 1958
- Summer Cup
  - Winners (6): 2001, 2004, 2010, 2011, 2016, 2022
  - Runners-up (7): 1971, 1997, 1998, 2003, 2008, 2020, 2021
- NPL Summer Series
  - Winners (1): 2018
- Vase Cup
  - Winners: (1): 2001
- Falkinder Cup
  - Winners (6): 1919, 1921, 1924, 1928, 1946, 1948
  - Runners-up (10): 1922, 1923, 1925, 1926, 1931, 1935, 1936, 1937, 1947, 1959
- Steve Hudson Cup
  - Winners (4): 2008, 2009, 2010, 2011
- Association Cup
  - Runners-up (1): 1960
- Ascot Gold Cup
  - Runners-up (1): 1960
- Lloyd Triestino Cup
  - Runners-up (1): 1975
