= Darcy Street =

Stadium in Hobart, Australia

- Interactive map of Darcy Street
- Location: D'Arcy Street, South Hobart
- Coordinates: 42.89580°S 147.30902°E
- Capacity: 4,500
- Surface: Grass

Construction
- Opened: 1910

Tenants
- South Hobart (TSC/NPL Tasmania/Australian Championship) (1910–present); South Hobart Storm (Tasmania Rugby League) (2013–2015)

Darcy Street, (also D'Arcy Street or the South Hobart Oval) is a multi-use stadium in D'Arcy Street, South Hobart, Australia. It is mainly used for soccer and is the home ground for South Hobart FC. The stadium has a capacity of 1,500 people.
