= Ulverstone Soccer Club =

Soccer club in Tasmania

Ulverstone
- Full name: Ulverstone Soccer Club
- Ground: Westside Park - Ulverstone Show Ground, Ulverstone
- Chairman: Elise Mee
- Manager: Michael Amos
- League: NPL Tasmania
- 2026: 10th of 10
- Website: http://www.ulverstonesc.com/
Home colours

Ulverstone Soccer Club, is a soccer club which represents Ulverstone in the Tasmanian Northern Championship. The club also fields teams in all junior divisions, as well as women's teams. Ulverstone play their home games at the Ulverstone Show grounds, in Ulverstone, Tasmania.

Ulverstone's only brief period of glory came when they won back-to-back Northern Premierships in 1994, and 1995, local twins Shaun and Adam Conkie who both played with Ulverstone in this period were recruited to the Morwell Falcons in the National Soccer League in 1996. The Ulverstone club have also been state champions once in 1986 winning a play-off final versus White Eagles 2–1 on aggregate.

In September 2025, Football Tasmania announced that Ulverstone and South East United had been accepted into the National Premier Leagues Tasmania for the 2026 season.

== Honours ==
- State Championship: 1986
- Northern Premiership: 1994; 1995
