= Launceston City FC =

Launceston City
- Full name: Launceston City Football Club
- Nicknames: City, Juventus, Juve
- Founded: 1958
- Ground: TassieCare Park, Prospect Vale
- Capacity: 4,000
- Chairperson: Jessica Woodroffe
- Manager: Daniel Syson
- League: NPL Tasmania
- 2026: 4th of 10
- Website: https://launcestoncity.com.au
Home colours	Away colours	Third colours

Launceston City Football Club (formerly Launceston Juventus) is an Australian association football club based in Launceston, Tasmania. The club's home ground is Prospect Vale Park in Prospect Vale, where it has been based since 1978. The club competes in the state's top tier, NPL Tasmania, administered by Football Tasmania. Founded in 1958 by members of Launceston's Italian community, many of whom migrated after World War II, the club fields senior men's, women's and junior teams.

The club has operated a junior program since 1984. Following a policy to remove ethnic names from Australian club football in the late 1990s, the junior arm competed as the Westside Devils Junior Soccer Club from 1998 to 2016, later as Launceston City Devils, and amalgamated with the senior club in 2019 to compete under the Launceston City name. The program fields teams from Under-5 to Under-16.

Launceston City also runs girls' and women's programs across multiple age groups, including a senior women's team that has won fourteen Northern Premier League titles. The women's first team went unbeaten in five consecutive league seasons from 2004 to 2008.

== History ==
City was particularly dominant in the 1960s, when they won every season except 1964. Although Northern Tasmania's most successful club with 19 Northern titles, they have failed to repeat their dominance of the 60s. The club uses the colours of Juventus and has links to the club. Prior to the cessation of ethnic affiliations by Australian football clubs in 1997, Launceston City were known as Launceston Juventus.

In 1978 Launceston Juventus relocated from their home ground at Brooks High School to Prospect Vale next to the Australian Italian Club where the club is still playing home games till this day. TassieCare Park has two playing grounds, fully functional floodlights for night games, clubrooms and changerooms.

Launceston City fields teams in the National Premier League Tasmania NPL, the second tier of Australian football, Northern Championship, Northern League 1, Under 18's and competes in the Northern Women's Championship Team this makes up over 100 senior registered players.

With regard to youth and juniors as of 2024, the club has nearly 600 players, compromising of 58 junior teams and over 100 enrolments in the clubs 'Juventus Academy'.

Since 2018, a video of former goalkeeper Niko Giantsopoulos kicking the ball away prior to an opposition striker taking a penalty has been a regular viral video on social media. The move, designed to throw his opponent off balance psychologically just prior to taking the kick, resulted in Giantsopoulos being issued a yellow card, but the penalty went ahead. Giantsopoulos saved the goal.

== Club Crest ==
Since Launceston City (Juventus) was founded in 1958 there has been four recorded club crests throughout the years.

First logo on record The first ever recorded club crest since Launceston City's (Juventus) beginning in 1958 was this crest. Featuring the club's Italian heritage, resolve for success and the Launceston's coat of arms down the bottom of the crest. Which features with the two Tasmanian Tiger's holding the gold of the shield which refers to the early history of gold-mining in nearby hills. The blue represents the junction of the North and South Esk rivers where the city (symbolised by the gold central disc) was founded and the Tamar River flowing north to the Bass Strait. The club crest still features prominently outside the Launceston City change rooms to this day which was painted by former President and Secretary Frank Stolp.

1980's

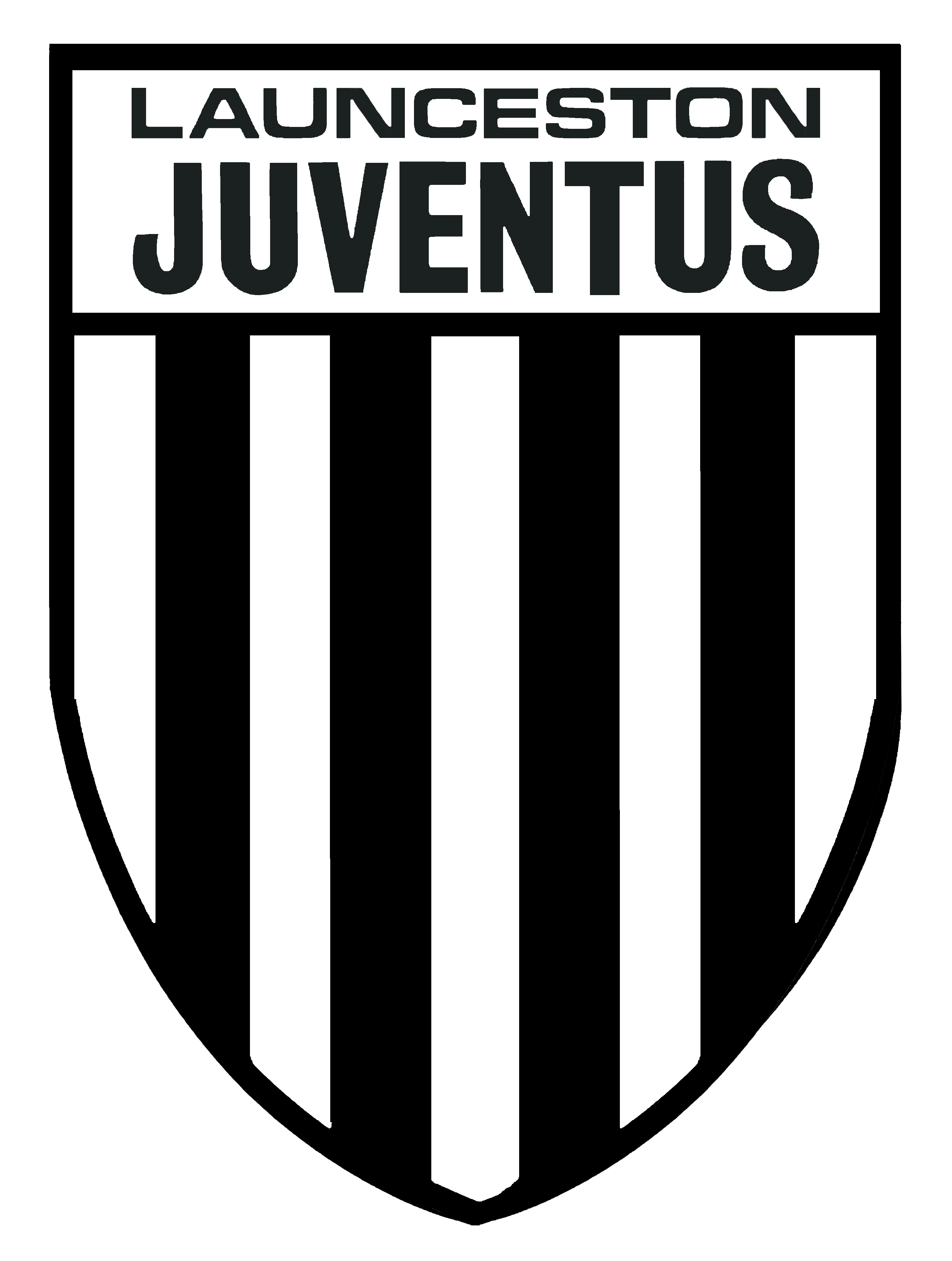

In the 1980s the club committee led by president and life member Ross Wesson formed a new design of the Launceston City (Juventus) club crest highlighting the club's relations to the club's Italian relations Juventus FC with the black and white stripes as seen on the club's home kits, the crest was used up until the early 2000s. The crest could be seen around Launceston in the form of stickers on motor vehicles and in the way of a keyring.

2008 to 2018

As part of the 50th anniversary celebrations, the club began its fifth decade with a new logo created by David Jordaan. This logo pays homage to the Italian heritage and was the first to feature a soccer ball in the centre of the crest as well as a ribbon at the base of the crest that marked its establishment of 1958.

2018 to Current

Designed by Nathan Fellows of Freestyle FX Signs the design features a wreath to commemorate the clubs 60th year and is the current crest of Launceston City Football Club

== Seasons ==
=== Men ===
Season	League												Cup Competitions		
Season	Name (national level)	Pld	W	D	L	GF	GA	GD	Pts^{1}	Position	Tasmanian Finals^{2}	NPL Finals	Statewide Cup	Northern Cup	FFA Cup
1958	North Premier League (2)									—	DNQ	Did not exist	Did not exist	Quarter-finals	Did not exist
1959	North Premier League (2)	21	21	0	0	134	—	—	42	1st	Runners-up	Did not exist	Did not exist	Winners	Did not exist
1960	North Premier League (2)									1st	Runners-up	Did not exist	Did not exist	Winners	Did not exist
1961	North Premier League (2)	18	18	0	0	—	—	—	36	1st	Winners	Did not exist	Did not exist	Winners	Did not exist
1962	North Premier League (2)									1st	Semi-finals	Did not exist	Did not exist		Did not exist
1963	North Premier League (2)									1st	Winners	Did not exist	Semi-finals	Runners-up	Did not exist
1964	North Premier League (2)									2nd	DNQ	Did not exist	Runners-up	Semi-finals	Did not exist
1965	North Premier League (2)	12	12	0	0	77	9	68	24	1st	Runners-up	Did not exist	Semi-finals	Winners	Did not exist
1966	North Premier League (2)									1st	Runners-up	Did not exist	Winners	Winners	Did not exist
1967	North Premier League (2)									2nd	DNQ	Did not exist	Semi-finals	Runners-up	Did not exist
1968	North Premier League (2)									1st	Runners-up	Did not exist	Semi-finals	Winners	Did not exist
1969	North Premier League (2)	18	18	0	0	86	12	74	36	1st	Runners-up	Did not exist	Semi-finals		Did not exist
1970	North Premier League (2)	18	11	1	6	63	19	44	23	4th	DNQ	Did not exist	—^{3}	Runners-up	Did not exist
1971	North Premier League (2)	18	16	2	0	70	14	56	34	1st	Runners-up	Did not exist	—	Runners-up	Did not exist
1972	North Premier League (2)	22	18	2	2	107	33	74	38	1st	Runners-up	Did not exist	Semi-finals		Did not exist
1973	North Premier League (2)	20	16	0	4	68	24	44	32	2nd	DNQ	Did not exist	Round of 16	Winners	Did not exist
1974	North Premier League (2)	22	15	3	4	61	27	34	33	3rd	DNQ	Did not exist	Quarter-finals	Did not exist	Did not exist
1975	North Premier League (2)	22	17	3	2	84	20	64	37	1st	Runners-up	Did not exist	Quarter-finals	Did not exist	Did not exist
1976	North Premier League (2)	18	14	1	3	51	21	30	29	1st	Runners-up	Did not exist	Winners	Did not exist	Did not exist
1977	North Premier League (2)	18	10	4	4	55	24	31	24	3rd	DNQ	Did not exist	Runners-up	Did not exist	Did not exist
1978	State League (2)	18	7	3	8	30	25	5	17	6th	Not held	Did not exist	Round of 16	Did not exist	Did not exist
1979	State League (2)	18	8	3	7	25	28	−3	19	5th	Not held	Did not exist	Round of 16	Did not exist	Did not exist
1980	State League (2)	18	6	2	10	21	32	−11	14	7th	Not held	Did not exist	Semi-finals	Did not exist	Did not exist
1981	State League (2)	18	14	4	0	53	15	38	32	2nd	Not held	Did not exist	Quarter-finals	Did not exist	Did not exist
1982	North Premier League (2)	21	14	4	3	66	25	41	32	2nd	DNQ	Did not exist	Semi-finals	Did not exist	Did not exist
1983	North Premier League (2)	18	7	4	7	44	30	14	18	5th	DNQ	Did not exist	Round of 16	Did not exist	Did not exist
1984	North Premier League (2)	20	8	4	8	26	41	−15	20	3rd	DNQ	Did not exist	Quarter-finals	Did not exist	Did not exist
1985	North Premier League (2)	18	9	4	5	32	24	8	22	5th	DNQ	Did not exist	Not held	Did not exist	Did not exist
1986	North Premier League (2)	18	14	0	4	60	13	47	28	3rd	DNQ	Did not exist	Not held	Did not exist	Did not exist
1987	North Premier League (2)	18	12	2	4	47	27	20	26	2nd	DNQ	Did not exist	Semi-finals	Did not exist	Did not exist
1988	State League (2)	18	9	4	5	40	31	9	31	3rd	Not held	Did not exist	—	Did not exist	Did not exist
1989	State League (2)	18	9	5	4	39	21	18	32	4th	Not held	Did not exist	—	Did not exist	Did not exist
1990	State League (2)	23	11	7	5	44	26	18	40	4th	Not held	Did not exist	Not held	Did not exist	Did not exist
1991	State League (2)	16	10	2	4	36	24	12	32	3rd	Not held	Did not exist	Winners	Did not exist	Did not exist
1992	State League (2)	21	8	4	9	30	33	−3	28	5th	Not held	Did not exist	Not held	Did not exist	Did not exist
1993	State League (2)	14	4	3	7	24	32	−8	15	7th	Not held	Did not exist	Not held	Did not exist	Did not exist
1994	State League (2)	16	9	3	4	35	24	11	30	2nd	Not held	Did not exist	Not held	Did not exist	Did not exist
1995	State League (2)	28	19	1	8	83	48	35	58	2nd	Not held	Did not exist	—	Did not exist	Did not exist
1996	State League (2)	18	8	3	7	30	31	−1	27	5th	Not held	Did not exist	Semi-finals	Did not exist	Did not exist
1997	State League (2)	18	8	2	8	46	47	−1	26	5th	Not held	Did not exist	Runners-up	Did not exist	Did not exist
1998	State League (2)	18	9	5	4	51	37	14	32	3rd	Not held	Did not exist	Not held	Did not exist	Did not exist
1999	State League (2)	16	11	2	3	43	18	25	35	2nd	Not held	Did not exist	Not held	Did not exist	Did not exist
2000	North Premier League (2)	20	15	4	1	80	19	61	49	2nd	Not held	Did not exist	Quarter-finals	Did not exist	Did not exist
2001	North Premier League (2)	18	16	2	0	59	12	47	50	1st	Runners-up	Did not exist	Quarter-finals	Did not exist	Did not exist
2002	North Premier League (2)	16	12	2	2	57	16	41	38	2nd	DNQ	Did not exist	Runners-up	Did not exist	Did not exist
2003	North Premier League (2)	15	11	3	1	49	19	30	36	2nd	DNQ	Did not exist	Semi-finals	Did not exist	Did not exist
2004	North Premier League (2)	16	12	4	0	45	13	32	40	2nd	DNQ	Did not exist	Winners	Did not exist	Did not exist
2005	North Premier League (2)	16	14	1	1	57	14	43	43	1st	Runners-up	Did not exist	Runners-up	Did not exist	Did not exist
2006	North Premier League (2)	16	9	4	3	43	20	23	31	2nd	DNQ	Did not exist	Runners-up	Did not exist	Did not exist
2007	North Premier League (2)	16	8	1	7	34	25	9	25	4th	DNQ	Did not exist	Winners	Did not exist	Did not exist
2008	North Premier League (2)	16	4	4	8	28	35	−7	16	7th	DNQ	Did not exist	Round of 16	Did not exist	Did not exist
2009	North Premier League (2)	16	2	2	12	17	42	−25	8	8th	DNQ	Did not exist	First round	Did not exist	Did not exist
2010	North Premier League (2)	16	2	2	12	35	51	−16	8	8th	DNQ	Did not exist	First round	Did not exist	Did not exist
2011	North Premier League (2)	16	4	4	8	26	33	−7	16	7th	DNQ	Did not exist	First round	Did not exist	Did not exist
2012	North Premier League (2)	16	5	3	8	22	40	−18	18	6th	DNQ	Did not exist	Round of 16	Did not exist	Did not exist
2013	Victory League (2)^{4}	21	0	1	20	13	115	−102	1	8th	DNQ	DNQ	Round of 16	Did not exist	Did not exist
2014	Victory League (2)	21	3	1	17	29	86	−57	10	8th	DNQ	DNQ	Quarter-finals	Did not exist	DNQ
2015	Victory League (2)	21	7	3	11	39	51	−12	24	5th	Quarter-finals	DNQ	Quarter-finals	Did not exist	DNQ
2016	NPL Tasmania (2)^{4}	21	7	2	12	24	58	−34	23	5th	Quarter-finals	DNQ	Round of 16	Did not exist	DNQ
2017	NPL Tasmania (2)	21	5	3	13	25	58	−33	18	6th	Quarter-finals	DNQ	Semi-finals	Did not exist	DNQ
2018	NPL Tasmania (2)	21	11	4	6	56	32	24	37	4th	Not held	DNQ	Semi-finals	Did not exist	DNQ
2019	NPL Tasmania (2)	24	7	4	14	38	51	−13	25	7th	Not held	DNQ	Round of 16	Did not exist	DNQ
2020	NPL Tasmania (2)^{4}	14	1	1	12	13	32	-19	4	8th	Not held	Cancelled	Semi-finals	Did not exist	Cancelled
2021	NPL Tasmania (2)	21	7	1	13	26	48	−22	22	5th	Not held	Not held	Semi-finals	Did not exist	DNQ
2022	NPL Tasmania (2)	21	9	2	10	31	44	−13	29	5th	Not held	Not held	Round of 16	Did not exist	DNQ
2023	NPL Tasmania (2)	21	8	3	10	26	34	−8	27	6th	Not held	DNQ	Quarter-finals	Did not exist	DNQ
2024	NPL Tasmania (2)	21	9	4	8	38	34	4	31	5th	Not held	Not held	Quarter-finals	Did not exist	DNQ
2025	NPL Tasmania (2)	21	16	2	3	82	22	60	50	2nd	Not held	Not held	Semi-finals	Did not exist	DNQ
2026	NPL Tasmania (2)	18	10	1	7	40	36	4	31	4th	Semi-finals	Not held	Round of 16	Did not exist	DNQ

Notes
1. Up to and including 1987, a win was worth 2 points; from 1988 onward, 3 points.
2. No Tasmanian finals or playoffs were held in 1978–81 and 1988–99 (State League era), or in 2000 (State League in recess; competition reverted to North and South Premier Leagues).
3. The Statewide Cup was introduced in 1963, shifted to regional knockout competitions in 1970–71, then reverted to a statewide format from 1972 onward.
4. The statewide top tier was branded the Victory League (2013–2015) and has been NPL Tasmania (2016–present); both are the State League.
5. Shortened season due to COVID-19

=== Women ===
Season	League										Cup Competitions	
Season	Name (national level)	Pld	W	D	L	GF	GA	GD	Pts^{1}	Position	Tasmanian Finals	Statewide Cup
1982	North Premier League (1)^{2}	—	—	—	—	—	—	—	—	—	—	Not held
1983	North Premier League (1)	16	8	2	6	42	22	20	18	3rd	DNQ	Not held
1984	North Premier League (1)	20	16	1	3	48	7	41	33	3rd	DNQ	Not held
1985	North Premier League (1)	—	—	—	—	—	—	—	—	—	—	Not held
1986	North Premier League (1)	18	10	4	4	45	20	25	24	3rd	DNQ	Not held
1987	North Premier League (1)	18	18	0	0	—	—	—	36	1st	—	Not held
1988	North Premier League (1)	—	—	—	—	—	—	—	—	—	—	Not held
1989	North Premier League (1)	—	—	—	—	—	—	—	—	—	—	Not held
1990	North Premier League (1)	—	—	—	—	—	—	—	—	—	—	Not held
1991	North Premier League (1)	—	—	—	—	—	—	—	—	—	—	Not held
1992	North Premier League (1)	—	—	—	—	—	—	—	—	—	—	Not held
1993	North Premier League (1)	—	—	—	—	—	—	—	—	—	—	Not held
1994	North Premier League (1)	—	—	—	—	—	—	—	—	—	—	Not held
1995	North Premier League (1)	—	—	—	—	—	—	—	—	—	—	Not held
1996	North Premier League (1)	—	—	—	—	—	—	—	—	—	—	Not held
1997	North Premier League (2)^{3}	—	—	—	—	—	—	—	—	—	—	Not held
1998	North Premier League (2)	16	13	1	2	106	32	74	40	2nd	Not held	Not held
1999	North Premier League (2)	—	—	—	—	—	—	—	—	—	Not held	Not held
2000	North Premier League (2)	18	18	0	0	147	12	135	54	1st	Not held	Not held
2001	North Premier League (2)	15	15	0	0	95	8	87	45	1st	Not held	Not held
2002	North Premier League (2)	14	12	0	2	—	—	—	36	2nd^{4}	Not held	Not held
2003	North Premier League (2)	18	12	1	5	79	25	54	37	2nd	Not held	Not held
2004	North Premier League (2)	16	13	1	2	90	11	79	40	2nd	Not held	Not held
2005	North Premier League (1)^{5}	14	14	0	0	81	6	75	42	1st	Not held	Not held
2006	North Premier League (1)	15	15	0	0	109	14	95	45	1st	Runners-up	Semi-finals
2007	North Premier League (1)	16	16	0	0	110	8	102	48	1st	Winners	Quarter-finals
2008	North Premier League (2)^{6}	18	18	0	0	144	6	138	54	1st	Runners-up	Quarter-finals
2009	North Premier League (2)	18	17	0	1	148	8	140	51	1st	Not held	Round of 16
2010	North Premier League (2)	17	17	0	0	161	3	158	51	1st	Semi-finals	Semi-finals
2011	North Premier League (2)	15	15	0	0	136	8	128	45^{7}	1st	Semi-finals	Runners-up
2012	North Premier League (2)	19	18	0	1	164	10	154	54	1st	Winners	Semi-finals
2013	North Premier League (2)	18	16	1	1	110	15	95	49	1st	Semi-finals	Quarter-finals
2014	North Premier League (2)	18	16	1	1	139	9	130	49	2nd	Semi-finals	Semi-finals
2015	North Premier League (2)	21	17	2	2	167	31	136	53	2nd	Semi-finals	Winners
2016	Women's Super League (2)^{8}	12^{9}	9	0	3	55	21	34	27	2nd	Not held	Not held
2017	Women's Super League (2)	21	15	1	5	84	30	54	46	2nd	Not held	Runners-up
2018	Women's Super League (2)	21	10	3	8	59	40	19	33	3rd	Not held	Quarter-finals
2019	—	—	—	—	—	—	—	—	—	—	—	—
2020	North Premier League (3)	14	4	2	8	23	39	−16	14	6th	Not held	Round of 16
2021	North Premier League (3)	21	8	3	10	39	55	−16	27	5th	Not held	Did not enter
2022	North Premier League (3)	21	6	2	13	29	50	−21	20	6th	Not held	Did not enter
2023	North Premier League (3)	21	4	1	16	20	61	−41	13	7th	Not held	Round of 16
2024	North Premier League (3)	20	7	2	11	33	36	−3	23	4th	Not held	Did not enter
2025	North Premier League (3)	18	14	3	1	55	17	38	45	1st	Not held	Quarter-finals
2026	Women's Super League (2)	21	5	4	12	27	70	-43	19	7th	Not held	Round of 16

Notes
1. Up to and including 1987, a win was worth 2 points; from 1988 onward, 3 points.
2. The North Premier League was titled the Women’s Northern League from 1983 to 1996; Northern Women’s Premier League from 1997 to 2014; and from 2015 onward Northern Women’s Championship.
3. The Women's National Soccer League commenced with the 1996–97 season, making the North Premier League the second level of the Australian women's football league system from 1997 to 2004.
4. Football Federation Tasmania’s season summaries for 2002 only the league champion; full standings and match statistics aren’t provided.
5. The Women's National Soccer League ceased after the 2004 season, leaving Australia without a national women’s league from 2005 to 2007.
6. The W-League was established in 2008 as Australia's top-level women's football competition, making the North Premier League the second level of the Australian women's football league system.
7. 2011 figures are taken from archived ladder/results snapshots in August 2011 and reflect matches to those dates; a complete final ladder has not been located.
8. The Women’s Super League, a statewide competition, was announced in December 2015 and began in 2016.
9. In 2016 the Women’s Super League ran as a 12-week pilot alongside the Northern and Southern Premier Leagues (i.e., a shortened season).

== Honours ==
=== Men ===
Type	Competitions	#	Winners	#	Runners-up
Statewide	State Championship^{1}	2	1961, 1963	11	1959, 1960, 1965, 1966, 1969, 1971, 1972, 1975, 1976, 2001, 2005
Statewide	State League^{2}	—	—	5	1981, 1994, 1995, 1999, 2025
Statewide	Statewide Cup^{3}	5	1966, 1976, 1991, 2004, 2007	6	1964, 1977, 1997, 2002, 2005, 2006
Statewide	Cadbury Trophy^{4}	1	1979	—	—
Northern	Northern Premiership^{5}	17	1959, 1960, 1961, 1962, 1963, 1965, 1966, 1968, 1969, 1971, 1972, 1975, 1976, 1984, 1986, 2001, 2005	10	1964, 1967, 1973, 1982, 1987, 2000, 2002, 2003, 2004, 2006
Northern	Northern Knockout Cup^{6}	7	1959,1960, 1961, 1965, 1966, 1968, 1973	4	1963, 1967, 1970, 1971
Northern	Northern Combined Knockout Cup	1	1965	1	1968
Northern	Steve Hudson Cup^{7}	9	1987, 1989, 1991, 1993, 1996, 2002, 2004, 2005, 2007	1	2006
Northern	Advocate Coca-Cola Night Soccer Series^{8}	1	1981	—	—

Notes
1. Historically often decided by a playoff between North and South league winners. In 1978–81 and 1988–99 (earlier State League eras) the league winner was also crowned the State Champion, and no additional final series or playoff was held.
2. Since the reintroduction of the State League in 2013 it was branded the Victory League (2013–2015) and has been National Premier Leagues Tasmania (2016–present).
3. The Statewide Cup has been named the Milan Lakoseljac Memorial Trophy since 2000.
4. The Cadbury Trophy was a statewide knockout competition held in addition to the Statewide Cup.
5. Currently known as the Northern Championship; often called the Northern Premier League, with clubs participating from the North and (since 1969) North-West of Tasmania.
6. The Northern Tasmania Soccer Association (NTSA) Knockout Cup is a knockout competition for clubs from Northern Tasmania.
7. The North and North West Combined League Cup is a knockout cup competition involving clubs from Northern and North-West Tasmania.
8. The Steve Hudson Cup was a northern pre-season competition.
9. The Night Soccer Series was a northern competition held at Devonport.

=== Women ===
Type	Competitions	#	Winners	#	Runners-up
Statewide	State Championship^{1}	2	2007, 2012	2	2006, 2008
Statewide	State League^{2}	—	—	2	2016, 2017
Statewide	Statewide Cup	1	2015	—	—
Northern	Northern Premiership^{3}	17	1987, 1997, 1998, 2000, 2001, 2002, 2005, 2006, 2007, 2008, 2009, 2010, 2011, 2012, 2013, 2016, 2025	2	2003, 2004

Notes
1. Historically often decided by a playoff between North and South league winners or in a finals serie until the introduction of the State League.
2. Women's State League introduced in 2016, known as the Women's Super League.
3. Currently known as the Northern Championship; often called the Northern Premier League, with clubs participating from the North and North-West of Tasmania.

== Individual honours ==
=== Men's State League ===
Player of the Year

Year	Player
1978	(Scotland) Tom Strickland
1986	(England) Colin Guest
1987	(England) Peter Savill
1989	(England) Peter Savill
1994	(England) Anthony Valentine
2025	(Australia) Angus Taylor

Notes
1. Tom Strickland was joint State League Player of the Year in 1978 with Larry Nunn (New Town Eagles). Due to a higher yellow-card count, Strickland did not receive the medal and was instead presented with a silver-plated tea set, delivered later by the Tasmanian Soccer Federation.

Walter Pless Media Award

Year	Player
2025	(Australia) Angus Taylor
2026	(Australia) William Humphrey

Golden Boot

Year	Player	Goals
1981	(England) Peter Sawdon	20
1988	(England) Colin Guest	22
1990	(Australia) Roger Mies	22
2025	(England) Thierry Swaby; (Australia) Angus Taylor	25

Peter Sawdon also awarded Rothmans Medal winner (State League Player of the Year) 1985 and 1988 with George Town United.

Goal of the Year

Year	Player
2018	(Australia) Noah Mies
2024	(England) Thierry Swaby

Rising Star Award

Year	Player
2017	(Australia) Noah Mies

Coach of the Year

Year	Coach
2015	(Australia) Lino Sciulli
2022	(Australia) Lino Sciulli
2025	(England) Daniel Syson

Team of the Year

Year	Coach	Player(s)
2025	(England) Daniel Syson	(Australia) William Humphrey; (Japan) Kazuki Hashimoto; (England) Thierry Swaby; (Australia) Angus Taylor

=== Women's State League ===
Player of the Year

Year	Player
2017	(England) Beth Bygrave

=== Northern Men's League ===
Player of the Year

Year	Player
1961	(England) Terry Clark
2003	(Australia) Justin Dyer

Golden Boot

Year	Player	Goals
1969	(Germany) Hans Streit	25
1973	(Germany) Hans Streit	22
2000	(Australia) Antonio Macri	23
2004	(Australia) Alex Brownlie	14
2005	(Australia) Roger Mies	14

=== Northern Women's League ===
Player of the Year

Year	Player
2005	(Australia) Jill Couch
2006	(Australia) Jill Couch
2007	(Australia) Chelsea Smith
2008	(Australia) Chelsea Smith
2009	(Australia) Chelsea Smith
2011	(Australia) Lauren Hough
2013	(Australia) Caitlin Storay
2014	(Australia) Caitlin Storay
2015	(Australia) Caitlin Storay

Coach of the Year

Year	Coach
2008	(Australia) Jason Jones
2009	(Australia) Jason Jones
2011	(Australia) Jason Jones
2025	(Australia) Michael Cheney; (Australia) Stephen Pearce

Northern Women's League Golden Boot

Year	Player	Goals
1999	(Australia) Chelsea Smith	71
2000	(Australia) Chelsea Smith	73
2005	(Australia) Chelsea Smith	
2007	(Australia) Chelsea Smith	43
2008	(Australia) Chelsea Smith	62
2009	(Australia) Chelsea Smith	58
2010	(Australia) Chelsea Smith	44
2011	(Australia) Chelsea Smith	35

== Records ==
=== Men's ===
Biggest Win:

Date	Venue	Competition	Home team	Home team Goals	Away team	Away team Goals
02/08/1981	Prospect Vale	Tasmanian State League	Launceston Juventus	12	Glenorchy Croatia	1

Highest Scoring Game

Date	Venue	Competition	Home team	Home team Goals	Away team	Away team Goals
02/08/2025	Prospect Vale	Tasmanian State League	Launceston City	12	Clarence Zebras	3

=== Women's ===
Biggest Win:

Date	Venue	Competition	Home team	Home team Goals	Away team	Away team Goals
24/03/2018	Prospect Vale	Tasmanian State League	Launceston City	11	Clarence United	0

Highest Scoring Game

Date	Venue	Competition	Home team	Home team Goals	Away team	Away team Goals
24/03/2018	Prospect Vale	Tasmanian State League	Launceston City	11	Clarence United	0

== Hall of Fame ==
=== Football Tasmania Hall of Fame ===
Year	Inductee	Club involvement
2025	(Netherlands) Peter Mies	Player, coach and administrator
2025	(England) Ken Morton	Coach
2026	(England) Peter Savill	Player and coach
2026	(Australia) Mandy Di Guglielmo	Player

=== Club Hall of Fame teams ===
Men's 1958 - 1978
Player	Position
(Italy) Len Gugliotti	Goalkeeper
(Australia) Warren Lockett	Goalkeeper
(Australia) Marshall Brown	Goalkeeper
(Netherlands) Peter Mies (C)	Centre half
(Scotland) Tom Strickland	Centre half
(Italy) Flavio De Paoli	Left back
(Italy) Luigi Mischis	Right back
(England) Terry Clark (VC)	Midfield
(England) Arthur Webb	Midfield
(England) Ross Wesson	Midfield
(Italy) Tony Zanetto	Midfield
(Netherlands) Billy Van Der Pols	Left wing
(Italy) Mario Morosini	Right wing
(Germany) Hans Streit	Forward
(Italy) Enrico Visentin	Forward

Men's 1979 - 2008
Player	Position
(England) Nick Scott	Goalkeeper
(Australia) Alex Brownlie	Centre back
(England) Ernie Guest	Centre back
(England) Steve Guest	Centre back
(England) Jeff Butler	Left back
(England) Barry Hemsley	Full back
(Australia) Justin Dyer	Midfield
(Australia) Luigi Gugliotti	Midfield
(Australia) Leighton Hodge	Midfield
(Republic of Ireland) Liam Monagle (VC)	Midfield
(England) Peter Savill (C)	Midfield
(England) Tony Valentine	Midfield
(England) Colin Guest	Forward
(Australia) Roger Mies	Forward
(England) Peter Sawdon	Forward

Women's 1983 - 2008
Player	Position
(Australia) Anna Lord	Goalkeeper
(Australia) Amanda Newson	Goalkeeper
(Australia) Melissa Wilcox (née Dyer)	Centre back
(Australia) Sharon O'Halloran	Centre back
(Australia) Jenny Duffy (née Maher)	Full back
(Australia) Jenni Jones	Full back
(Australia) Anna Luciani	Full back
(Australia) Kirsten Mccreghan	Full back
(Australia) Kristen Beams	Midfield
(Australia) Jill Couch (C)	Midfield
(Australia) Kailee Goodwin	Midfield
(Australia) Mandy Di Guglielmo (VC)	Midfield
(Australia) Kylie Jones	Midfield
(Australia) Julie Webb	Midfield
(Australia) Chelsea Smith	Forward

== Office Holders ==
Years	Chairperson	Senior President	Junior President	Treasurer	Secretary
1958	N/A	(Italy) Frank Buttazoni	N/A		
1959	N/A	(Italy) Frank Buttazoni	N/A	(England) Terry Clark	
1960	N/A	(Italy) Frank Buttazoni	N/A	(England) Terry Clark	(Australia) Frank Smith
1961	N/A	(Italy) Frank Buttazoni	N/A	(England) Terry Clark; (Australia) Frank Smith	(Australia) Frank Smith
1962	N/A	(Italy) Frank Buttazoni	N/A	(Italy) Egidio Vedovelli	(Australia) Frank Smith
1963	N/A	(Italy) Frank Buttazoni	N/A	(Italy) Egidio Vedovelli	(Australia) Frank Smith
1964	N/A	(Italy) Frank Buttazoni	N/A	(Italy) Egidio Vedovelli	(Australia) Frank Smith
1965	N/A	(Italy) Ivo Rossetto	N/A	(Italy) Egidio Vedovelli	(Australia) Frank Smith
1966	N/A	(Italy) Ivo Rossetto	N/A	(Italy) Egidio Vedovelli	(Australia) Frank Smith
1967	N/A	(Australia) Warren Lockett	N/A	(Italy) Egidio Vedovelli	(Australia) Frank Smith; (Germany) Hans Streit
1968	N/A		N/A	(Italy) Egidio Vedovelli	
1969	N/A		N/A		
1970	N/A		N/A		
1971	N/A		N/A		
1972	N/A		N/A		
1973	N/A		N/A		
1974	N/A	(Italy) Ivo Rossetto	N/A		(England) Dennis Jones
1975	N/A		N/A		
1976	N/A	(Netherlands) Peter Mies	N/A	(England) Ross Wesson	
1977	N/A	(Scotland) Tom Strickland	N/A	(Australia) John Biggar	(Netherlands) Frank Stolp
1978	N/A	(Scotland) Alec McNeill	N/A	(England) Terry Clark	(Netherlands) Frank Stolp
1979	N/A	(Netherlands) Peter Mies	N/A	(Scotland) John McKenna	(Netherlands) Frank Stolp
1980	N/A	(Netherlands) Peter Mies	N/A	(Australia) Kieran Fisher	(Netherlands) Billy Van Der Pols
1981	N/A	(Netherlands) Peter Mies	N/A	(Australia) Kieran Fisher	(Australia) Rod Willey
1982	N/A	(Netherlands) Peter Mies	N/A	(England) Ross Wesson	(Australia) Rod Willey
1983	(England) Terry Clark	(Netherlands) Peter Mies	N/A	(England) Ross Wesson	(Australia) Rod Willey
1984	N/A	(Netherlands) Frank Stolp	(Australia) Rob Brewer	(England) Terry Clark	(Australia) Rod Willey
1985	N/A	(England) Ross Wesson	(Australia) Rob Brewer	(England) Terry Clark	(Australia) Rod Willey
1986	N/A	(England) Ross Wesson	(Australia) Rob Brewer	(Australia) Antonio Capellazzo	(Netherlands) Frank Stolp
1987	N/A	(England) Ross Wesson	(Australia) Rob Brewer	(Australia) Antonio Capellazzo	(Australia) Jenny Duffy (née Maher)
1988	N/A	(Australia) Doc Burdon	(Australia) Rob Brewer	(Australia) Antonio Capellazzo	(Australia) Jim Hunter
1989	N/A	(England) Ross Wesson	(Australia) Rob Brewer	(Australia) Bruce Phillip	(Australia) Jenny Duffy (née Maher)
1990	N/A	(England) Ross Wesson	(Australia) Rob Brewer	(Australia) Antonio Capellazzo; (Australia) Rob Luciani	(England) Ross Wesson
1991	N/A	(England) Ross Wesson	(Australia) Rob Brewer	(Australia) Rob Luciani	(Netherlands) Frank Stolp
1992	N/A	(Netherlands) Frank Stolp	(Australia) Rob Brewer	(Australia) Rob Luciani	(Australia) Mandy Di Gugliemo
1993	N/A	(England) Ross Wesson	(Australia) Rob Brewer	(Australia) Rob Luciani	(Australia) Mandy Di Gugliemo
1994	N/A	(Australia) Kerry Dennis	(Australia) Rob Brewer	(Australia) Frank Deak	(Australia) John Tsheppera
1995	N/A	(England) Ross Wesson	(Australia) Rob Brewer	(Australia) Roger Mies	(Australia) Frank Deak
1996	N/A	(England) Ross Wesson	(Australia) Rob Brewer	(Australia) Roger Mies	(Australia) Peg Couch
1997	N/A	(England) Ross Wesson	(Australia) Rob Brewer	(Australia) Roger Mies	(Australia) Peg Couch
1998	N/A	(Netherlands) Peter Mies	(Australia) Rob Brewer	(Australia) Roger Mies	(Australia) Peg Couch
1999	N/A	(Netherlands) Peter Mies	(Australia) Rob Brewer	(Australia) Rob Luciani	(Scotland) Jessie McKay
2000	N/A	(Netherlands) Peter Mies	(Australia) Rob Brewer	(Australia) Rob Luciani	(Scotland) Jessie McKay
2001	N/A	(Australia) Robert Luciani	(Australia) Rob Brewer	(Australia) Ric De Santi	(Scotland) Jessie McKay
2002	N/A	(Australia) Robert Luciani	(Australia) Rob Brewer	(Australia) Ric De Santi	(Scotland) Jessie McKay
2003	N/A	(Australia) Robert Luciani	(Australia) Rob Brewer	(Australia) Ric De Santi	(Scotland) Jessie McKay
2004	N/A	(Australia) Noel Van Est	(Australia) Rob Brewer	(Australia) Ric De Santi	(Scotland) Jessie McKay
2005	N/A	(Australia) Noel Van Est	(Australia) Rob Brewer	(Australia) Ric De Santi	(Australia) Noel Van Est
2006	N/A	(Australia) Noel Van Est	(Australia) Rob Brewer	(Australia) Rob Luciani	(Australia) Tracey Pel
2007	N/A	(Australia) Noel Van Est	(Australia) Rob Brewer	(Australia) Sam Wesson	(Scotland) Jessie McKay
2008	N/A	(Australia) Noel Van Est	(Australia) Rob Brewer	(Australia) Sam Wesson	(Scotland) Jessie McKay
2009	N/A	(Australia) Jason Jones	(Australia) Michael Hancox	(Australia) Rob Luciani	(Australia) Tony Rossi
2010	N/A	(Australia) Jason Jones	(Australia) Michael Hancox	(Australia) Rob Luciani	(Australia) Tony Rossi
2011	N/A	(Australia) Jason Jones	(Australia) Michael Hancox	(Australia) Rob Luciani	(Australia) Tony Rossi
2012	N/A	(Australia) Jason Jones	(Australia) Michael Hancox	(Australia) Rob Luciani	(Australia) Tony Rossi
2013	N/A	(Australia) Jason Jones	(Australia) Michael Hancox	(Australia) Rob Luciani	(Australia) Jenny Duffy (née Maher)
2014	N/A	(Australia) David Backhouse	(Australia) Michael Hancox	(Australia) Rob Luciani	(Republic of Ireland) Celine Egan
2015	N/A	(Republic of Ireland) Austin Fagan	(Australia) Michael Hancox	(Australia) David Backhouse; (Australia) Rob Luciani	(Australia) Jenny Duffy (née Maher)
2016	N/A	(Republic of Ireland) Austin Fagan	(Australia) Michael Hancox	(Australia) David Backhouse	(Australia) Jenny Duffy (née Maher)
2017	N/A	(Republic of Ireland) Austin Fagan	(Australia) Michael Hancox	(Australia) David Backhouse	(Australia) Jenny Duffy (née Maher)
2017	N/A	(Republic of Ireland) Austin Fagan	(Australia) Brook Noble	(Australia) David Backhouse	(Australia) Jenny Duffy (née Maher)
2018	N/A	(England) Andrew Heap; (Australia) Robert Dorazio	(Australia) Brook Noble	(Australia) David Backhouse; (Australia) Roger Mies	(Australia) Jenny Duffy (née Maher); (Australia) Amanda Murphy
2019	N/A	(Australia) Danny Linger	(Australia) Alex Aylott	(Australia) Amanda Murphy	(Australia) Cathy Hancox
Junior & senior committees amalgamated into one club and formed an overarching board to oversee all operations of the football club
2020	(Australia) Luigi Gugliotti	(Australia) Danny Linger	(Australia) Tarnya Frost	(Australia) Chris Hennessy	(Australia) Amy Geach; (Australia) Debbie Ratcliffe
2021	(Australia) Luigi Gugliotti	(Australia) Danny Linger	(Australia) Tarnya Frost	(Australia) Chris Hennessy	(Australia) Debbie Ratcliffe
2022	(Australia) Luigi Gugliotti	(Australia) Danny Linger	(Australia) Tarnya Frost	(Australia) Ric De Santi	(Australia) Debbie Ratcliffe
2023	(Australia) Luigi Gugliotti	(Australia) Danny Linger	(Australia) Joshua Perry	(Australia) Ric De Santi	(Australia) Debbie Ratcliffe; (Australia) Jessica Woodroffe
2024	(Australia) Luigi Gugliotti	(Australia) Danny Linger	(Australia) Joshua Perry	(Australia) Ric De Santi	(Australia) Jessica Woodroffe
2025	(Australia) Luigi Gugliotti	(Australia) Danny Linger	(Australia) Reannah Douglas	(Australia) Ric De Santi	(Australia) Jessica Woodroffe
2026	(Australia) Jessica Woodroffe	(Australia) Danny Linger	(Australia) Richard Davis	(Australia) Ric De Santi	(Australia) Joanne Marsden

== Life Members ==
Years	Life Member
1979	(Italy) Egidio Vedovelli | (Italy) Aldo De Santi
1980	(Netherlands) Peter Mies | (Germany) Hans Streit | (Scotland) Tom Strickland
1981	(Italy) Sergio Del Grande
1982	(Italy) Enrico Visentin | (Italy) Mario Morosini
1983	(Netherlands) Christine Mies
1987	(England) Ross Wesson
1990	(Australia) Ric De Santi | (Australia) Leighton Hodge | (England) Peter Savill
1992	(England) Barry Hemsley
1999	(Australia) Roger Mies
2000	(Australia) Mandy Di Gugliemo | (Australia) Robert Luciani
2002	(Australia) Luigi Gugliotti
2005	(Scotland) Jessie McKay
2008	(Scotland) David Craig | (Australia) Jenny Duffy (née Maher) | (England) Jeff Butler | (Australia) Jill Couch
2010	(Australia) Noel Van Est | (Australia) Tony Rossi | (Australia) Jason Jones
2014	(Australia) Lino Sciulli | (Australia) Matthew Heather
2015	(Republic of Ireland) Mick Egan
2016	(Australia) Bill Couch
2020	(Australia) Jamie Richardson
2021	(Australia) Danny Linger | (Australia) Melissa Wilcox (née Dyer)
2023	(Australia) Justin Dyer
2024	(Australia) Robert D'Orazio
2026	(Australia) Jillian Cunningham | (Australia) Geoff Powell
Years	Westside Devils Life Member
	(Australia) Rob Brewer
	(Australia) Veronica Brewer
	(Australia) Noel Van Est
	(Australia) Judy Avnell
	(Australia) Ian Loft
	(Australia) Jeff Garwood
	(Australia) Ken Claridge
	(Australia) Mick Egan
	(Australia) Tony Rossi
	(Australia) Nigel Ratcliffe
	(Scotland) John McKenna
	(Australia) Scott Hudson
	(Australia) Dirk Nankervis
	(Australia) Maree Bauld
	(Australia) Garry Swan
	(Australia) Paul Mischis
	(Republic of Ireland) Austin Fagan
	(Australia) Peter Ryan
	(Australia) Louise Lucas
	(Australia) Cathy Hancox
	(Australia) Sharon Parker
	(Australia) Michael Hancox

== Leadership and Awards ==
=== Men ===
Year	Coach	Captain	Best & Fairest	Golden Boot
1958	(Italy) Tony Zanetto	(Italy) Tony Zanetto		
1959	(Italy) Tony Zanetto	(England) Terry Clark		
1960	(England) Albert Clark	(England) Terry Clark		
1961	(England) Albert Clark	(England) Terry Clark		
1962	(England) Albert Clark	(England) Terry Clark		
1963	(Netherlands) Peter Mies	(Netherlands) Peter Mies		
1964	(Netherlands) Peter Mies	(Netherlands) Peter Mies		
1965	(Scotland) Jock Beresford	(Scotland) George Arnott		
1966	(Scotland) Jock Beresford; (Germany) Hans Streit	(Scotland) George Arnott; (England) Arthur Webb		
1967	(Germany) Hans Streit	(Germany) Hans Streit		
1968	(Italy) Enrico Visentin	(England) Alan Whitemore		
1969	(Italy) Enrico Visentin	(Germany) Hans Streit		(Germany) Hans Streit (25)
1970				
1971		(Scotland) Tom Strickland		
1972	(England) John Austin	(Scotland) Tom Strickland		
1973	(Scotland) Tom Strickland			(Germany) Hans Streit (22)
1974	(England) Ross Wesson	(England) Ross Wesson		
1975	(England) Ross Wesson			(Germany) Hans Streit
1976	(England) John Austin	(Scotland) Tom Strickland		
1977		(Scotland) Tom Strickland		
1978	(Scotland) Jock Glass	(Scotland) Tom Strickland		(Australia) Tom Gibbons; (Australia) Leighton Hodge (5)
1979	(England) Paul Throssel	(Scotland) Tom Strickland	(England) Barry Hemsley	Hili (6)
1980	(England) Ross Wesson		(England) Barry Hemsley	
1981	(England) Ken Worden		(England) Peter Sawdon	(England) Peter Sawdon (20)
1982	(England) Bobby Kent		(England) Peter Savill	(England) Peter Sawdon
1983	(England) Bobby Kent		(England) Peter Savill	
1984	(England) Ross Wesson		(England) Barry Hemsley	
1985	(Australia) Lars McNaughton		(Australia) Shane Dennis	
1986	(Australia) Leighton Hodge		(England) Colin Guest	
1987	(Australia) Leighton Hodge		(England) Colin Guest; (England) Peter Savill	
1988	(England) Ross Wesson	(Australia) Luigi Gugliotti	(England) Peter Savill	(England) Colin Guest (22)
1989	(England) Peter Savill		(Republic of Ireland) Liam Monagle	
1990	(England) Peter Savill		(Australia) Roger Mies	(Australia) Roger Mies (22)
1991	(England) Peter Savill	(Republic of Ireland) Liam Monagle	(Australia) Paul Gimpl	(Australia) Roger Mies (11)
1992	(England) Peter Savill	(Republic of Ireland) Liam Monagle	(Australia) Drew McNeill	
1993	(Scotland) David Craig	(Republic of Ireland) Liam Monagle	(Australia) Roger Mies	
1994	(Scotland) David Craig	(Australia) Roger Mies	(Australia) John Visentin	
1995	(Scotland) David Craig	(Australia) Roger Mies	(Australia) John Compagne	
1996	(Australia) Peter Davidson	(Australia) Roger Mies	(Australia) Justin Dyer	
1997	(Australia) Lino Sciulli	(Australia) Justin Dyer	(Australia) Chris Couch	
1998	(England) Peter Sawdon	(Australia) Justin Dyer	(Australia) Justin Dyer; (England) Mark Donohue	(Australia) Chris Couch (21)
1999	(Scotland) David Craig	(Australia) Roger Mies	(Australia) Roger Mies	(Australia) Jason Clayton (14)
2000	(Scotland) David Craig	(Australia) Justin Dyer	(Australia) Alex Brownlie	(Australia) Antonio Macri (23)
2001	(Australia) Luigi Gugliotti	(Australia) Justin Dyer	(Australia) Justin Dyer	(Australia) Roger Mies (10)
2002	(Australia) Luigi Gugliotti	(Australia) Justin Dyer	(Australia) Alex Brownlie; (Australia) Nick Macri; (Australia) Ben Van Est	(Australia) Antonio Macri (15)
2003	(Australia) Luigi Gugliotti	(Australia) Justin Dyer	(Australia) Roger Mies	(Australia) Nick Macri (12)
2004	(Australia) Luigi Gugliotti	(Australia) Justin Dyer	(Australia) David Jordaan	(Australia) Alex Brownlie (14)
2005	(England) Ken Morton	(Australia) David Jordaan	(Australia) Roger Mies	(Australia) Roger Mies (14)
2006	(Australia) Luigi Gugliotti	(Australia) Justin Dyer	(Australia) Alex Brownlie; (Australia) Justin Dyer	(Australia) Drew McNeill (15)
2007	(Scotland) David Craig	(Australia) Alex Brownlie	(Australia) Justin Dyer	(Australia) Roger Mies (14)
2008	(England) Peter Savill	(England) Michael Frost	(England) Michael Frost	(England) Michael Frost; (Australia) Sam Morley (6)
2009	(England) Peter Savill	(England) Michael Frost	(Australia) Luke Kolodjashnij	(Australia) Chris Hill (5)
2010	(Australia) Kurt Reynolds	(Australia) Luke Kolodjashnij	(Australia) Luke Kolodjashnij	(Australia) Antonio Macri (15)
2011	(Australia) Lino Sciulli	(Australia) Luke Kolodjashnij	(Australia) Michael Beechey	(Australia) Antonio Macri (8)
2012	(Australia) Lino Sciulli	(England) Michael Frost	(Australia) Sam Morley	(Australia) Antonio Macri (8)
2013	(Australia) Dane Hudson; (Republic of Ireland) Mark Egan	(Australia) Shane Egan	(Australia) Alex Sciulli	(United Arab Emirates) Saeed Bin Sumaida (5)
2014	(Australia) Kurt Reynolds	(Australia) Nathan Bartlett	(Australia) Nick Abougelis; (Australia) Nathan Bartlett	(Australia) Nathan Bartlett (6)
2015	(Australia) Lino Sciulli	(Australia) Toby Omenihu	(Australia) Dominic Rossi	(Australia) Dominic Rossi (8)
2016	(Australia) Lino Sciulli	(Australia) Toby Omenihu	(Australia) Aaron Campbell	(Australia) Nathan Bartlett; (Australia) Aaron Campbell (5)
2017	(Australia) Ben Brookfield	(Australia) Nathan Butler	(Australia) Aaron Campbell	(Australia) Noah Mies (6)
2018	(Malaysia) Jes Kenth	(England) Daniel Syson	(England) Daniel Syson	(United States) Tyler Fischer (19)
2019	(England) Peter Sawdon; (Australia) Lino Sciulli	(Australia) Lindsay Millington	(Australia) Charlie Dyer	(Australia) Noah Mies (16)
2020	(England) Roger Hardwicke	(England) Samuel Ridgard	(Australia) Matthew Oh	(Australia) Samuel Ridgard (6)
2021	(England) Roger Hardwicke; (Australia) Lino Sciulli	(Australia) Jarrod Linger	(Australia) Jarrod Linger	(Afghanistan) Yasin Mohammadi; (England) Daniel Smith (6)
2022	(Australia) Lino Sciulli	(Australia) Lachlan Clark	(Australia) Lachlan Clark	(Ghana) Albert Amankwaa (8)
2023	(England) Daniel Syson	(Australia) Lachlan Clark / (Australia) Joel Stone	(Australia) Joel Stone	(Australia) Toby Simeoni (6)
2024	(England) Daniel Syson	(Australia) Lachlan Clark / (Australia) Joel Stone	(England) Thierry Swaby	(England) Thierry Swaby (18)
2025	(England) Daniel Syson	(Australia) Lachlan Clark / (Australia) Jack Woodland	(Australia) Angus Taylor	(England) Thierry Swaby (25); (Australia) Angus Taylor (25)
2026	(England) Daniel Syson	(Australia) Lachlan Clark / (Australia) Jack Woodland	(Australia) Charles Reynolds	(Japan) Yoshiya Okawa (8); (Australia) Charles Reynolds (8)

=== Notes ===
Since 2009, the senior men’s Best and Fairest has been known as the Peter Savill Medal.

=== Women ===
Year	Coach	Captain	Best & Fairest	Golden Boot
1982			(Australia) Meredith Bowers	(Australia) Julie Vedovelli
1983	(England) Kerry Dennis			(Australia) Anna Luciani (16)
1984	(England) Kerry Dennis			
1985	(England) Kerry Dennis			
1986				
1987				
1988				
1989				
1990				
1991				
1992				
1993				
1994				
1995		(Australia) Jill Couch		
1996				
1997				
1998				
1999			(Australia) Laura Coleman; (Australia) Chelsea Smith	(Australia) Chelsea Smith (71)
2000	(Australia) Jason Jones	(Australia) Jill Couch		(Australia) Chelsea Smith (73)
2001	(Australia) Jason Jones	(Australia) Jill Couch		
2002	(Australia) Ben Quor	(Australia) Melissa Wilcox (née Dyer)	(Brazil) Jacqui Hernández-Morales	
2003	(Australia) Ben Quor	(Australia) Jill Couch	(Australia) Jill Couch	(Australia) Chelsea Smith (24)
2004	(Australia) Jason Jones	(Australia) Jill Couch	(Australia) Jill Couch	(Australia) Chelsea Smith (35)
2005	(Australia) Jason Jones	(Australia) Jill Couch		(Australia) Chelsea Smith
2006	(Australia) Jason Jones	(Australia) Jill Couch		(Australia) Jill Couch (26)
2007	(Australia) Jason Jones	(Australia) Jill Couch	(Australia) Chelsea Smith; (Australia) Kirsten Mccreghan	(Australia) Chelsea Smith (43)
2008	(Australia) Jason Jones	(Australia) Jill Couch		(Australia) Chelsea Smith (62)
2009	(Australia) Jason Jones	(Australia) Jill Couch		(Australia) Chelsea Smith (58)
2010	(Australia) Jason Jones	(Australia) Jill Couch		(Australia) Chelsea Smith (44)
2011	(Australia) Jason Jones	(Australia) Jill Couch		(Australia) Chelsea Smith (35)
2012	(Australia) Jason Jones	(Australia) Jill Couch	(Australia) Jacinta Hall	(Australia) Lauren Hough (35)
2013	(Australia) Jacinta Hall			(Australia) Caitlin Storay (17)
2014	(Australia) Col Nicholson	(Australia) Jemma Storay		(Australia) Caitlin Storay (24)
2015	(Australia) Jason Jones		(Australia) Caitlin Storay	(Australia) Chelsea Smith (41)
2016	(Australia) Jason Jones	(Australia) Caitlin Storay	(England) Beth Bygrave	(Australia) Jazmin Gorrie (14)
2017	(Australia) Luigi Gugliotti	(Australia) Caitlin Storay	(England) Beth Bygrave	(Australia) Emily Hernyk (22)
2018	(Australia) Luigi Gugliotti	(England) Selina Steventon	(Australia) Brooke Hernyk	(Australia) Keilin Fagan; (Australia) Emily Hernyk (12)
No women's team in 2019
2020	(Australia) Barry Baker (Australia) / Darren Cook	(Australia) Kiara Walsh	(England) Sarah Campbell	(England) Sarah Campbell (4)
2021	(Australia) Barry Baker	(England) Sarah Campbell	(Australia) Aimee Hawes	(Australia) Zali Kirkman (19)
2022	(Australia) Richard Reilly	(England) Sarah Campbell	(England) Sarah Campbell	(Australia) Rebecca Barrett (8)
2023	(Australia) Richard Reilly / (Australia) Jason Hawes	(England) Sarah Campbell	(England) Sarah Campbell	(Australia) Isabella Taylor (5)
2024	(Australia) Michael Cheney / (Australia) Stephen Pearce	(England) Sarah Campbell	(England) Sarah Campbell	(England) Sarah Campbell; (Australia) Amali Wynter (5)
2025	(Australia) Michael Cheney / (Australia) Stephen Pearce	(England) Sarah Campbell	(England) Sarah Campbell	(England) Sarah Campbell; (Australia) Olivia Smith (12)
2026	(Australia) Alex Aylott	(Australia) Chelsea Wing	(Australia) Ruby Powell; (Australia) Sophie Wilson	(Australia) Hollie Jones (14)

=== Notes ===
Since 2026, the senior women’s Best and Fairest has been known as the Mandy Di Guglielmo Medal.
