= 2021 National Premier Leagues Tasmania =

2021 season of the National Premier Leagues Tasmania

National Premier Leagues Tasmania
- Season: 2021
- Dates: 20 March – 11 September 2021
- Champions: Glenorchy Knights
- Matches: 84
- Goals: 323 (3.85 per match)
- Top goalscorer: Brody Denehey (Devonport City) (22 goals)
- Best goalkeeper: Lachlan Hart (Glenorchy Knights)
- Biggest home win: South Hobart 10–2 Riverside Olympic (4 September)
- Biggest away win: Riverside Olympic 0–8 Devonport City (20 July)
- Highest scoring: South Hobart 10–2 Riverside Olympic (4 September)
- Longest winning run: Devonport City (10 matches)
- Longest unbeaten run: Devonport City (15 matches)
- Longest winless run: Riverside Olympic (20 matches)
- Longest losing run: Olympia Warriors and Riverside Olympic (5 matches)

The 2021 National Premier Leagues Tasmania was the ninth season of the National Premier Leagues Tasmania, the top-tier men's association football competition in Tasmania. The season began on 20 March and concluded on 11 September 2021. Eight clubs contested the competition, with each club playing 21 matches across three meetings with each opponent.

Glenorchy Knights won the league championship with 50 points, finishing three points ahead of runners-up Devonport City. The title was decided on the final day: Glenorchy defeated Launceston City 1–0, while Devonport lost 2–1 away to Kingborough Lions United.

No Tasmanian league finals series was played. Glenorchy's league title would normally have qualified the club for the national National Premier Leagues finals series, but the national tournament was not held in 2021 due to the COVID-19 pandemic.

== Teams ==
=== Stadiums and locations ===
Team	Location	Region	Stadium	Capacity
Clarence Zebras	Howrah, Hobart	South	Wentworth Park	1,000
Devonport City	Devonport	North-West	Valley Road Ground	1,500
Glenorchy Knights	Glenorchy, Hobart	South	KGV Park	4,000
Kingborough Lions United	Kingston	South	Clennett's Lightwood Park	400
Launceston City	Prospect Vale, Launceston	North	Buckby Motors Park	4,000
Olympia Warriors	Warrane, Hobart	South	Empire Couriers Park (Warrior Park)	1,000
Riverside Olympic	Riverside, Launceston	North	Windsor Park	2,500
South Hobart	South Hobart, Hobart	South	Darcy Street	1,500

Stadium capacities are indicative published ground figures rather than verified 2021 attendance limits.

Stadium names reflect the published 2021 fixtures. Kingborough also hosted Devonport at UTAS Stadium on 17 April.

=== Locations ===
Locations of the 2022 National Premier Leagues Tasmania teams

== League table ==
The following table records the final standings. Glenorchy Knights finished top despite Devonport City having a superior goal difference.

Pos	Team	Pld	W	D	L	GF	GA	GD	Pts
1	Glenorchy Knights (C)	21	15	5	1	52	16	+36	50
2	Devonport City	21	15	2	4	54	15	+39	47
3	South Hobart	21	13	4	4	58	24	+34	43
4	Kingborough Lions United	21	11	3	7	42	37	+5	36
5	Launceston City	21	7	1	13	26	48	−22	22
6	Olympia Warriors	21	5	3	13	29	46	−17	18
7	Clarence Zebras	21	5	3	13	33	55	−22	18
8	Riverside Olympic	21	1	3	17	29	82	−53	6

Source: GameDay and RSSSF
Rules for classification: 1) Points; 2) Goal difference; 3) Goals scored
(C) Champions

Historical source discrepancy: Walter Pless's published final table records Glenorchy Knights with 53 goals for and 17 against, Olympia Warriors with 30 for and 47 against, and Clarence Zebras with 32 goals for. It also lists Kingborough as having 11 wins, four draws and six losses but 36 points, which is inconsistent with a three-point win system. The GameDay result-by-result totals yield 52–16, 29–46, 33–55 and an 11–3–7 Kingborough record, matching RSSSF and other compiled final standings. The latter figures are used here.

== Results ==
The following matrix lists all 84 regular-season matches, with the home team appearing on the left. Where a club hosted another opponent twice, both scores are shown in chronological order.

Home \ Away	First home meeting								Second home meeting							
Home \ Away	CLA	DEV	GLE	KLU	LCI	OLY	RIV	SOU	CLA	DEV	GLE	KLU	LCI	OLY	RIV	SOU
Clarence Zebras	—	1–2	2–9	1–2	4–1	4–1	1–3	1–2	—			2–2		3–1		0–4
Devonport City	2–1	—	4–0	2–0	2–0	2–2	6–1	0–1	7–0	—	1–1			3–0		2–1
Glenorchy Knights	3–1	1–0	—	3–0	5–0	1–0	5–0	1–1	1–0		—		1–0	0–0		2–0
Kingborough Lions United	0–1	2–0	2–5	—	3–1	2–0	3–1	3–3		2–1	1–4	—			4–2	
Launceston City	2–0	0–1	0–1	0–2	—	2–1	3–2	1–1	2–0	0–3		1–4	—		3–2	
Olympia Warriors	1–5	0–3	2–2	1–2	4–1	—	3–2	1–4				1–2	2–3	—	4–1	
Riverside Olympic	2–2	2–3	1–3	4–4	1–5	1–2	—	0–4	2–2	0–8	0–3				—	0–4
South Hobart	6–2	0–2	1–1	2–1	5–0	1–3	10–2	—				2–1	4–1	2–0		—

Source: GameDay, checked against BetExplorer.
Key: Home win · Draw · Away win · No match (same club).

== Season statistics ==
=== Top scorers ===
Devonport City's Brody Denehey won the Golden Boot with 22 goals.

Rank	Player	Club	Goals
1	Brody Denehey	Devonport City	22
2	Nicholas Morton	South Hobart	20
3	Kasper Hallam	South Hobart	16
4	Adam McKeown	Kingborough Lions United	15
5	Riley Dillon	Clarence Zebras	14
6	Nicholas Mearns	Glenorchy Knights	13
7	Kyle Vincent	Olympia Warriors	11
8	Fletcher Fulton	Riverside Olympic	10
9	Austin Yost	Glenorchy Knights	8
9	Nicholas Naden	Glenorchy Knights	8

Source: GameDay player scoring statistics.
All players tied within the top ten ranking positions are included.

Note: Austin Yost played for Olympia Warriors before transferring to Glenorchy Knights during 2021; the archived GameDay scoring summary lists his season total under Glenorchy Knights.

== Season awards ==
Football Tasmania's 2021 season awards recognised outstanding players, coaches and officials across the NPL Tasmania. South Hobart's Kasper Hallam received both the Best and Fairest and Players' Player awards.

Award	Recipient	Club
Golden Boot	Brody Denehey	Devonport City
Golden Glove	Lachlan Hart	Glenorchy Knights
Best and Fairest	Kasper Hallam	South Hobart
Coach of the Year	Ken Morton	South Hobart
Players' Player	Kasper Hallam	South Hobart
Rising Star	Kyle Vincent	Olympia Warriors
Walter Pless Media Award	Brody Denehey	Devonport City
Referee of the Year	Brenton Kopra	—

== Positions by round ==
The positions below are calculated after each of the 21 chronological scheduled match-week periods, using only games played by that point. The 17 April Kingborough–Devonport game (originally listed in round 16) is included in period 4; the four round 4 fixtures played on 4 September are included in the final period. Each period's table is ranked on points, goal difference and goals scored. Consequently, the columns describe the standings as they stood at the time, not retrospectively corrected round-by-round standings.

Team	1	2	3	4	5	6	7	8	9	10	11	12	13	14	15	16	17	18	19	20	21
Glenorchy Knights	4	3	2	2	3	2	2	1	1	1	1	2	2	2	2	2	2	2	2	2	1
Devonport City	3	5	4	4	4	4	3	3	2	2	2	1	1	1	1	1	1	1	1	1	2
South Hobart	1	1	1	1	2	1	1	2	3	3	3	3	3	3	3	3	3	3	3	3	3
Kingborough Lions United	2	2	3	3	1	3	4	4	4	4	4	4	4	4	4	4	4	4	4	4	4
Launceston City	5	7	8	8	7	7	7	7	7	7	7	7	5	6	5	5	5	5	5	5	5
Olympia Warriors	6	4	6	6	5	5	5	5	5	5	5	5	6	7	7	7	7	7	6	6	6
Clarence Zebras	8	8	5	5	6	6	6	6	6	6	6	6	7	5	6	6	6	6	7	7	7
Riverside Olympic	7	6	7	7	8	8	8	8	8	8	8	8	8	8	8	8	8	8	8	8	8

Source: Calculated from the dated GameDay results; cross-checked against BetExplorer.
Key: 1 = first place.
