= 2019 National Premier Leagues Tasmania =

2019 season of the National Premier Leagues Tasmania

National Premier Leagues Tasmania
- Season: 2019
- Dates: 1 March – 7 September 2019
- Champions: Devonport City
- Matches: 108
- Goals: 498 (4.61 per match)
- Top goalscorer: Mathew Sanders (Hobart Zebras) (31 goals)
- Best goalkeeper: Nathan Pitchford (Devonport City)
- Biggest home win: South Hobart 13–1 Clarence United (18 August)
- Biggest away win: Clarence United 0–13 South Hobart (23 March)
- Highest scoring: South Hobart 13–1 Clarence United (18 August)
- Longest winning run: Devonport City and Olympia Warriors (7 matches)
- Longest unbeaten run: Devonport City (15 matches)
- Longest winless run: Clarence United (16 matches)
- Longest losing run: Clarence United (16 matches)

The 2019 National Premier Leagues Tasmania was the seventh season of the National Premier Leagues Tasmania, the top-tier men's association football competition in Tasmania. The competition was contested from 1 March to 7 September 2019 by nine clubs over 27 scheduled rounds. Each club played 24 matches, consisting of three meetings with each of the other eight clubs, and had three byes.

Devonport City retained the league title with 62 points from 20 wins, two draws and two losses, six points ahead of Olympia Warriors. South Hobart finished third with 47 points. Devonport represented Tasmania in the 2019 National Premier Leagues finals series, losing 3–2 to Maitland FC in the elimination round on 21 September.

The 2019 season was the last contested by Clarence United and Hobart Zebras as separate clubs. They amalgamated in September 2019 to form Clarence Zebras ahead of the following season.

== Teams ==
Riverside Olympic and Glenorchy Knights joined the top division for 2019, expanding the competition from eight to nine clubs.

=== Stadiums and locations ===
Team	Location	Region	Stadium	Capacity
Clarence United	Howrah, Hobart	South	Wentworth Park	1,000
Devonport City	Devonport	North-West	Valley Road Ground	1,500
Glenorchy Knights	Glenorchy, Hobart	South	KGV Park	4,000
Hobart Zebras	Glenorchy, Hobart	South	KGV Park	4,000
Kingborough Lions United	Kingston	South	Clennett's Lightwood Park	400
Launceston City	Prospect Vale, Launceston	North	Buckby Motors Park	1,000
Olympia Warriors	Warrane, Hobart	South	Empire Couriers Park (Warrior Park)	1,000
Riverside Olympic	Riverside, Launceston	North	Windsor Park	1,000
South Hobart	South Hobart, Hobart	South	Darcy Street	1,500

Capacities are indicative ground figures from published venue directories, not verified 2019 licensed capacities. Published estimates for Valley Road differ between directories.

The results archive also records some matches at alternate grounds: Clarence United twice played home fixtures at KGV Park; Glenorchy Knights once and Hobart Zebras twice played home fixtures at North Hobart Oval; and South Hobart hosted Kingborough at KGV Park on 28 August.

=== Locations ===
Locations of the 2019 National Premier Leagues Tasmania clubs

== League table ==
The final standings are based on Football Tasmania's GameDay results archive and agree with the independently published rankings in other season records.

Pos	Team	Pld	W	D	L	GF	GA	GD	Pts	Qualification or relegation
1	Devonport City (C)	24	20	2	2	91	23	+68	62	2019 National Premier Leagues Finals
2	Olympia Warriors	24	18	2	4	80	31	+49	56	
3	South Hobart	24	14	5	5	80	30	+50	47	
4	Hobart Zebras	24	12	6	6	74	36	+38	42	Merged with Clarence United at the end of the season
5	Glenorchy Knights	24	10	2	12	58	45	+13	32	
6	Kingborough Lions United	24	9	3	12	43	50	−7	30	
7	Launceston City	24	7	4	13	38	51	−13	25	
8	Riverside Olympic	24	4	2	18	26	72	−46	14	
9	Clarence United	24	1	0	23	8	160	−152	3	Merged with Hobart Zebras at the end of the season

Source: GameDay and BetExplorer
Rules for classification: 1) Points; 2) Goal difference; 3) Goals scored
(C) Champions

Merger note: Hobart Zebras and Clarence United amalgamated after the 2019 season to form Clarence Zebras, which entered the NPL Tasmania in 2020.

Source comparison: The result-by-result GameDay totals are Olympia Warriors 80–31 and Hobart Zebras 74–36. The RSSSF historical summary records Olympia with 79 goals for and Hobart Zebras with 35 goals against, and an archived Walter Pless table contains further scoring discrepancies; the GameDay figures above balance across all 108 matches and are used here.

Olympia Warriors’ 3–1 victory against South Hobart on 19 July was initially ruled a forfeit after a player-eligibility dispute, but an independent tribunal upheld Olympia's appeal and reinstated the original result. The final table reflects the restored win and points.

== Results ==
The matrix shows all 108 league matches, with the home team listed on the left. Where a club hosted the same opponent twice, the results are separated into first and second home meetings in match-date order. No second-meeting score indicates that a second home fixture was not scheduled.

Home \ Away	First home meeting									Second home meeting								
Home \ Away	CLA	DEV	GLE	HOB	KLU	LCI	OLY	RIV	SOU	CLA	DEV	GLE	HOB	KLU	LCI	OLY	RIV	SOU
Clarence United	—	0–12	0–5	0–4	1–5	0–6	0–6	1–0	0–13	—	0–8				1–4		1–3	1–6
Devonport City	9–0	—	4–0	1–1	6–0	5–2	1–0	4–2	4–1		—	3–1		2–1		4–1	6–2	
Glenorchy Knights	10–0	2–5	—	1–2	4–1	0–1	1–3	4–2	0–3	8–0		—		1–4	3–0	1–3		
Hobart Zebras	9–0	2–1	2–2	—	1–2	2–2	2–2	3–2	4–5	6–1	2–2	1–2	—				6–2	
Kingborough Lions United	8–0	2–3	3–2	0–3	—	0–0	1–4	2–1	1–2	3–0			3–2	—	0–2	2–3		
Launceston City	4–0	1–2	2–2	0–3	4–0	—	0–1	1–2	1–5		0–4		0–4		—	0–3		2–2
Olympia Warriors	9–0	1–2	2–1	3–1	3–0	5–2	—	5–0	2–1	7–1			2–4			—	5–1	3–1
Riverside Olympic	2–0	0–2	1–5	0–9	0–1	1–2	2–4	—	0–5			0–1		1–1	2–1		—	0–0
South Hobart	13–1	0–1	2–0	1–1	4–2	4–1	3–3	3–0	—		2–0	1–2	2–0	1–1				—

Source: GameDay and BetExplorer.
Key: Home win · Draw · Away win · No match (same club).

== Season statistics ==
=== Top goalscorers ===
Rank	Player	Club	Goals
1	Mathew Sanders	Hobart Zebras	31
2	Miles Barnard	Devonport City	28
3	Jake Ryan	Olympia Warriors	21
4	Joffrey Nkoso	Olympia Warriors	20
5	Noah Mies	Launceston City	16
6	Nick Naden	Glenorchy Knights	15
7	Matthew Pace	Hobart Zebras	14
8	Declan Brown	Glenorchy Knights	12
8	Max Fitzgerald	Devonport City	12
10	Nicky Edwards	Hobart Zebras	11

Source: Football Tasmania's 2019 GameDay scoring summary; Golden Boot independently confirmed by Football Tasmania.

== Season awards ==
The following awards were presented for the 2019 NPL Tasmania season.

Award	Recipient	Club
Best and Fairest Player	Joel Stone	Devonport City
Players’ Most Valuable Player	Joel Stone	Devonport City
Walter Pless Media Award	Joel Stone	Devonport City
Golden Boot	Mathew Sanders (31 goals)	Hobart Zebras
Golden Glove	Nathan Pitchford	Devonport City
Coach of the Year	Rick Coghlan	Devonport City
Rising Star	Jarrod Hill	Riverside Olympic
Goal of the Year	Jonathon Ladic	Olympia Warriors
Sportsmanship Award	Nick Naden	Glenorchy Knights
Referee of the Year	Brenton Kopra	—

Best and Fairest Medal voting: Joel Stone won with 29 votes, ahead of Olympia's Jordan Scott (25) and Joffrey Nkoso and Hobart Zebras' Mathew Sanders (22 each).

== Positions by round ==
The following table shows the position of each club after all matches assigned to the corresponding round in the BetExplorer results archive are included. The standings are reconstructed from the recorded scores and use points, goal difference and goals scored to rank teams. Some fixtures were postponed and completed after subsequent rounds, so these figures represent positions by scheduled round, rather than necessarily the table as it stood on the original weekend. In BetExplorer's round allocation, rounds 4 and 5 contain three matches each, while rounds 8 and 9 contain five matches each; these assignments have been retained rather than redistributed.

Club	1	2	3	4	5	6	7	8	9	10	11	12	13	14	15	16	17	18	19	20	21	22	23	24	25	26	27
Devonport City	7	4	3	1	1	1	1	1	1	1	1	1	1	1	1	1	1	1	1	1	1	1	1	1	1	1	1
Olympia Warriors	1	4	2	5	5	6	4	2	2	2	2	3	2	2	3	3	2	2	2	2	2	2	2	2	2	2	2
South Hobart	7	3	5	4	4	3	2	4	3	3	3	2	3	3	2	2	3	3	3	3	3	3	3	3	3	3	3
Hobart Zebras	1	1	1	2	2	2	3	3	4	4	4	4	4	4	4	4	4	4	4	4	4	4	4	4	4	4	4
Glenorchy Knights	6	2	6	6	6	5	6	5	5	5	5	5	5	5	5	5	6	7	7	7	7	5	6	6	5	5	5
Kingborough Lions United	4	8	4	3	3	4	5	6	6	6	6	6	7	6	6	6	5	5	5	5	5	6	5	5	6	6	6
Launceston City	4	7	8	8	9	9	7	7	7	7	7	7	6	7	7	7	7	6	6	6	6	7	7	7	7	7	7
Riverside Olympic	9	9	9	9	7	7	8	8	8	8	8	8	8	8	8	8	8	8	8	8	8	8	8	8	8	8	8
Clarence United	3	6	7	7	8	8	9	9	9	9	9	9	9	9	9	9	9	9	9	9	9	9	9	9	9	9	9

Source: Calculated from the results allocated to each round by BetExplorer.
Key: 1 = first place (teams with identical points, goal difference and goals scored share a position).
