= 2022 National Premier Leagues Tasmania =

2022 season of the National Premier Leagues Tasmania

National Premier Leagues Tasmania
- Season: 2022
- Dates: 18 March – 10 September 2022
- Champions: Devonport City
- Matches: 84
- Goals: 335 (3.99 per match)
- Top goalscorer: Roberto Fernández Garrido (Devonport City) (27 goals)
- Best goalkeeper: Keegan Smith (Devonport City)
- Biggest home win: Devonport City 10–1 Olympia Warriors (18 June); South Hobart 10–1 Launceston City (6 August)
- Biggest away win: Riverside Olympic 2–11 Clarence Zebras (2 July)
- Highest scoring: Riverside Olympic 2–11 Clarence Zebras (2 July)
- Longest winning run: Devonport City (12 matches)
- Longest unbeaten run: Devonport City (19 matches)
- Longest winless run: Riverside Olympic (17 matches)
- Longest losing run: Olympia Warriors and Riverside Olympic (8 matches)

The 2022 National Premier Leagues Tasmania was the 10th season of the National Premier Leagues Tasmania, the top-tier men's association football competition in Tasmania. The season began on 18 March and concluded on 10 September 2022. Eight clubs contested the competition, with each club playing 21 matches across three meetings with each opponent.

Devonport City won the league championship with 58 points, finishing 13 points ahead of runners-up South Hobart. Devonport recorded 19 wins, one draw and one loss, scoring 71 goals and conceding 11. No separate Tasmanian finals series was contested in 2022; a new finals series was introduced in 2023.

== Teams ==
=== Stadiums and locations ===
Team	Location	Region	Stadium	Capacity
Clarence Zebras	Howrah	South	Wentworth Park	1,000
Devonport City	Devonport	North-West	Valley Road Ground	1,500
Glenorchy Knights	Glenorchy	South	KGV Park	4,000
Kingborough Lions United	Kingston	South	Clennett's Lightwood Park	400
Launceston City	Prospect Vale	North	Buckby Motors Park	4,000
Olympia Warriors	Warrane	South	Empire Couriers Park (Warrior Park)	1,000
Riverside Olympic	Riverside	North	Windsor Park	2,500
South Hobart	South Hobart	South	Darcy Street	1,500

Stadium capacities are indicative published ground figures rather than verified 2022 attendance limits.

=== Locations ===
Locations of the 2022 National Premier Leagues Tasmania teams

== League table ==
Pos	Team	Pld	W	D	L	GF	GA	GD	Pts
1	Devonport City (C)	21	19	1	1	71	11	+60	58
2	South Hobart	21	14	3	4	64	23	+41	45
3	Kingborough Lions United	21	13	2	6	53	32	+21	41
4	Glenorchy Knights	21	13	1	7	45	25	+20	40
5	Launceston City	21	9	2	10	34	44	−10	29
6	Clarence Zebras	21	5	2	14	35	52	−17	17
7	Olympia Warriors	21	3	0	18	21	69	−48	9
8	Riverside Olympic	21	1	3	17	12	79	−67	6

Source: GameDay and Walter Pless
Rules for classification: 1) Points; 2) Goal difference; 3) Goals scored
(C) Champions

Note: The archived GameDay ladder records only 20 matches for Launceston City and Olympia Warriors, omitting their fixture on 14 May 2022 from the played totals. The table above includes all 21 matches played by each club, using the final standings published by Walter Pless on 13 September 2022.

== Results ==
The following matrix lists all 84 regular-season matches, with the home team appearing on the left. Where a club hosted another opponent twice, both scores are shown in chronological order.

Home \ Away	First home meeting								Second home meeting							
Home \ Away	CLA	DEV	GLE	KLU	LCI	OLY	RIV	SOU	CLA	DEV	GLE	KLU	LCI	OLY	RIV	SOU
Clarence Zebras	—	2–3	1–2	0–4	1–1	5–0	1–1	0–2	—	1–5	1–3		0–3		1–0	
Devonport City	2–0	—	0–1	5–1	4–0	10–1	5–0	1–0		—		2–2	2–0		4–0	
Glenorchy Knights	4–0	1–2	—	1–4	0–1	2–1	5–0	1–1		0–1	—	1–0			3–0	
Kingborough Lions United	5–0	0–4	1–3	—	4–1	5–1	2–1	1–0	4–2			—	1–2	2–1		2–3
Launceston City	4–3	1–2	0–1	0–3	—	4–0	4–0	0–4			1–2		—	2–1		1–2
Olympia Warriors	0–3	0–4	0–5	1–3	0–1	—	4–0	0–5	0–1	0–4	3–1			—		1–2
Riverside Olympic	2–11	0–6	0–6	0–4	2–5	0–5	—	0–6				0–1	2–2	3–2	—	
South Hobart	4–0	1–2	3–0	4–4	10–1	7–0	1–1	—	3–2	0–3	5–3				1–0	—

Source: GameDay; checked against BetExplorer.
Key: Home win · Draw · Away win · No match (same club).

Result discrepancy: GameDay records Launceston City's home fixture against Olympia on 14 May 2022 as a 4–0 victory, which is the score used above. The contemporary match report published by Football Tasmania, Walter Pless's report and BetExplorer all give the score as 4–2. The two sources consequently produce different total goals-for and goals-against figures for those teams, though their points and positions are unchanged.

== Season statistics ==
=== Top scorers ===
Roberto Fernandez Garrido of Devonport City won the Golden Boot with 27 goals in 18 appearances.

Rank	Player	Club	Goals
1	Roberto Fernandez Garrido	Devonport City	27
2	Noah Mies	Kingborough Lions United	19
3	Nicholas Morton	South Hobart	16
4	Kobe Kemp	Kingborough Lions United	13
5	Eli Luttmer	Glenorchy Knights	10
5	Riley Dillon	Clarence Zebras	10
7	Iskander Van Doorne	South Hobart	9
7	Joshua Divin	South Hobart	9
9	Albert Amankwaa	Launceston City	8
9	Bradley Lakoseljac	South Hobart	8
9	Brody Denehey	Devonport City	8

Source: Football Tasmania's GameDay player scoring statistics.
All players tied within the top ten ranking positions are included.

== Season awards ==
Football Tasmania held its end-of-season awards at MyState Bank Arena on 12 September 2022.

Award	Recipient	Club
Golden Boot	Roberto Fernandez Garrido	Devonport City
Golden Glove	Keegan Smith	Devonport City
Best and Fairest	Kobe Kemp	Kingborough Lions United
Coach of the Year	Lino Sciulli	Launceston City
Players' Player	Nicholas Morton	South Hobart
Rising Star	Curtis Miley	Clarence Zebras
Walter Pless Media Award	Eli Luttmer	Glenorchy Knights
Referee of the Year	Brenton Kopra	—

== Positions by round ==
The table shows each club's league position at the conclusion of each round's scheduled match period. Postponed matches are included from the date on which they were played, rather than retrospectively added to their original rounds.

Team	Round																				
Team	1	2	3	4	5	6	7	8	9	10	11	12	13	14	15	16	17	18	19	20	21
Devonport City	3	3	2	2	1	1	1	1	1	1	1	1	1	1	1	1	1	1	1	1	1
South Hobart	1=	2	4	4	5	5	5	3	3	2	4	4	4	4	4	2	2	2	2	2	2
Kingborough Lions United	6	6	6	5	4	3	3	4	4	4	3	3	3	3	3	3	3	3	3	3	3
Glenorchy Knights	1=	1	1	1	2	2	2	2	2	3	2	2	2	2	2	4	4	4	4	4	4
Launceston City	4	5	3	3	3	4	4	5	5	5	5	5	5	5	5	5	5	5	5	5	5
Clarence Zebras	5	4	5	6	6	6	6	6	6	6	6	6	6	6	6	6	6	6	6	6	6
Olympia Warriors	7=	7	7	7	7	7	7	7	7	7	7	7	7	7	7	7	7	7	7	7	7
Riverside Olympic	7=	8	8	8	8	8	8	8	8	8	8	8	8	8	8	8	8	8	8	8	8

Source: Calculated from BetExplorer's 2022 match results and the archived GameDay league standings.
Key: 1 = first place; '=' = tied on points, goal difference and goals scored.

Note: The Round 3 fixture between Kingborough Lions United and Clarence Zebras was played on 4 May 2022, following Round 6. The postponed Round 2 fixture between South Hobart and Launceston City was played on 6 August 2022, after Round 16. Consequently, the standings for earlier rounds reflect the incomplete fixture programme at the time.
