= 2020 National Premier Leagues Tasmania =

2020 season of the National Premier Leagues Tasmania

National Premier Leagues Tasmania
- Season: 2020
- Dates: 18 July – 24 October 2020
- Champions: Devonport City
- Matches: 56
- Goals: 203 (3.63 per match)
- Top goalscorer: Alex Walter (Glenorchy Knights) (13 goals)
- Best goalkeeper: Nathan Pitchford (Devonport City) and Lachlan Hart (Glenorchy Knights)
- Biggest home win: Glenorchy Knights 7–0 Kingborough Lions United (19 September)
- Biggest away win: Launceston City 0–4 Olympia Warriors (10 October)
- Highest scoring: South Hobart 3–6 Olympia Warriors (26 September)
- Longest winning run: Devonport City (7 matches)
- Longest unbeaten run: Devonport City (14 matches)
- Longest winless run: Launceston City (10 matches)
- Longest losing run: Launceston City and Riverside Olympic (5 matches)

The 2020 National Premier Leagues Tasmania was the eighth season of the National Premier Leagues Tasmania, the top-tier men's association football competition in Tasmania. Following the postponement of football competitions during the COVID-19 pandemic in Australia, the season ran from 18 July to 24 October 2020. Eight clubs contested a shortened 14-round double round-robin, with each club playing every other club once at home and once away.

Devonport City won the championship without losing a match, recording 13 wins and one draw to finish with 40 points, nine ahead of runners-up Glenorchy Knights. It was Devonport's third consecutive NPL Tasmania title and fourth in five seasons.

The national National Premier Leagues finals series was cancelled in 2020 because of the pandemic, meaning Devonport did not progress to a national championship tournament. There was no separate Tasmanian NPL league finals series.

== Teams ==
=== Stadiums and locations ===
Team	Location	Region	Stadium	Capacity
Clarence Zebras	Howrah	South	Wentworth Park	1,000
Devonport City	Devonport	North-West	Valley Road Ground	1,500
Glenorchy Knights	Glenorchy	South	KGV Park	4,000
Kingborough Lions United	Kingston	South	Clennett's Lightwood Park	400
Launceston City	Prospect Vale	North	Buckby Motors Park	1,000
Olympia Warriors	Warrane	South	Empire Couriers Park (Warrior Park)	1,000
Riverside Olympic	Riverside	North	Windsor Park	1,000
South Hobart	South Hobart	South	Darcy Street	1,500

Stadium capacities are indicative published ground figures rather than verified 2020 attendance limits.

South Hobart's home fixture against Kingborough Lions United on 16 August was played at KGV Park, rather than its regular home ground, Darcy Street.

=== Locations ===
Locations of the 2020 National Premier Leagues Tasmania teams

== League table ==
Pos	Team	Pld	W	D	L	GF	GA	GD	Pts
1	Devonport City (C)	14	13	1	0	28	9	+19	40
2	Glenorchy Knights	14	10	1	3	37	13	+24	31
3	South Hobart	14	7	2	5	30	24	+6	23
4	Kingborough Lions United	14	6	3	5	26	34	−8	21
5	Olympia Warriors	14	6	1	7	32	27	+5	19
6	Clarence Zebras	14	4	2	8	20	32	−12	14
7	Riverside Olympic	14	2	3	9	17	32	−15	9
8	Launceston City	14	1	1	12	13	32	−19	4

Source: GameDay and Walter Pless
Rules for classification: 1) Points; 2) Goal difference; 3) Goals scored
(C) Champions

== Results ==
The matrix shows all 56 league matches, with the home team listed on the left. Each club hosted every other club once, so only one home-meeting result is shown for each pairing.

Home \ Away	CLA	DEV	GLE	KLU	LCI	OLY	RIV	SOU
Clarence Zebras	—	0–2	0–3	1–2	2–0	1–0	4–1	0–1
Devonport City	2–1	—	1–0	3–1	1–0	3–2	1–0	1–0
Glenorchy Knights	5–2	1–4	—	7–0	3–0	3–1	3–0	1–1
Kingborough Lions United	5–2	1–1	2–0	—	2–0	3–2	3–3	2–3
Launceston City	2–2	1–2	1–3	1–2	—	0–4	1–2	1–3
Olympia Warriors	1–2	1–2	0–3	3–3	2–1	—	5–1	2–1
Riverside Olympic	3–3	0–1	0–2	3–0	1–3	1–3	—	1–2
South Hobart	5–0	1–4	1–3	5–0	3–2	3–6	1–1	—

Source: GameDay and BetExplorer.
Key: Home win · Draw · Away win · No match (same club).

== Season statistics ==
=== Top scorers ===
Glenorchy Knights midfielder Alex Walter won the Golden Boot with 13 goals.

Rank	Player	Club	Goals
1	Alex Walter	Glenorchy Knights	13
2	Adam McKeown	Kingborough Lions United	9
3	Brody Denehey	Devonport City	6
3	Callum Brown	Olympia Warriors	6
3	Declan Brown	Olympia Warriors	6
3	Jack Ryan	Olympia Warriors	6
3	Nil Sanz	Riverside Olympic	6
3	Riley Dillon	Clarence Zebras	6
3	Samuel Ridgard	Launceston City	6
10	Danny Cowen	Kingborough Lions United	5
10	Fletcher Fulton	Riverside Olympic	5

Source: GameDay scoring summary.
All players tied at a ranking position within the top ten are included.

== Season awards ==
The 2020 NPL Tasmania awards were announced in November. Devonport City's Joel Stone received Best and Fairest honours, while Alex Walter won both the Golden Boot and Players' Player of the Year. The Golden Glove was shared by Nathan Pitchford and Lachlan Hart, who each kept six clean sheets.

Award	Recipient	Club
Golden Boot	Alex Walter	Glenorchy Knights
Golden Glove (joint)	Nathan Pitchford	Devonport City
Golden Glove (joint)	Lachlan Hart	Glenorchy Knights
Best and Fairest	Joel Stone	Devonport City
Players' Player of the Year	Alex Walter	Glenorchy Knights
Rising Star	Kasper Hallam	South Hobart
Coach of the Year	James Sherman	Glenorchy Knights

== Positions by round ==
The following table shows each club's league position at the conclusion of the scheduled matches in each round, using points, goal difference and goals scored as the ordering criteria. All 56 games are included.

Club	1	2	3	4	5	6	7	8	9	10	11	12	13	14
Clarence Zebras	3	5	6	7	7	6	6	7	6	6	6	6	6	6
Devonport City	4	2	1	1	1	1	1	1	1	1	1	1	1	1
Glenorchy Knights	8	4	3	3	2	2	2	2	2	2	2	2	2	2
Kingborough Lions United	1	3	2	2	3	4	4	3	4	5	3	5	5	4
Launceston City	5	7	7	8	8	8	8	8	8	8	8	8	8	8
Olympia Warriors	6	8	8	6	5	5	5	4	5	3	4	3	4	5
Riverside Olympic	7	6	5	5	6	7	7	6	7	7	7	7	7	7
South Hobart	2	1	4	4	4	3	3	5	3	4	5	4	3	3

Source: Calculated from the dated GameDay results.
Key: Green = first place at the conclusion of that round.
