= 2023 Australia Cup preliminary rounds =

Qualification rounds for 2023 season of Australian soccer competition

Tournament details
- Country: Australia
- Teams: 778

The 2023 Australia Cup preliminary rounds were the qualifying competition to decide 24 of the 32 teams to take part in the 2023 Australia Cup. The competition commenced in February and was completed in July.

== Schedule ==
The fixtures for the competition were as follows.

Round	Number of fixtures	Clubs	A-League	ACT	NSW	NNSW	NT	QLD	SA	TAS	VIC	WA
Preliminary round	1 + 7 byes	778 → 777	—	—	—	—	—	11 Feb	—	—	—	—
First round	62 + 19 byes	777 → 715	—	—	—	—	—	10–21 Feb	—	—	9–12 Feb	—
Second round	155 + 56 byes	715 → 548	—	—	11–12 Mar	17 Feb–20 Mar	—	10 Feb–1 Mar	—	—	16–19 Feb	25–26 Feb
Third round	198 + 9 byes	548 → 350	—	25 Feb–5 Mar	21–23 Mar	25 Feb–4 Apr	—	17 Feb–6 Apr	10–12 Feb	13–15 Mar	3–6 Mar	18–19 Mar
Fourth round	167	350 → 187	—	15–22 Mar	11–13 Apr	4 Mar–2 May	18 Apr–9 May	21 Mar–22 Apr	16–19 Mar	7–9 Apr	28 Mar–11 Apr	21–23 Apr
Fifth round	87 + 1 bye	187 → 100	—	11–20 Apr	25–27 Apr	11 Mar–30 May	16–23 May	4 Apr–20 May	14–16 Apr	29–30 Apr	26 Apr–9 May	16–17 May
Sixth round	44	100 → 56	—	9–11 May	9–17 May	10 Jun	30 May–3 Jun	23 May–10 Jun	9–16 May	20–21 May	16–23 May	6–14 Jun
Seventh round	22	56 → 34	—	3 Jun	31 May–6 Jun	20–21 Jun	23 Jun	12–25 Jun	31 May–7 Jun	10 Jun	6–13 Jun	20–21 Jun
Play-off round	2	34 → 32	17–18 Jul	—	—	—	—	—	—	—	—	—

- Some round dates in respective Federations overlap due to separate scheduling of Zones/Sub-Zones.

== Format ==
The preliminary rounds structures were as follows, and refer to the different levels in the unofficial Australian soccer league system:

- First round:

- 133 Victorian clubs from level 7 and below entered this stage.

- Second round:

- 54 Northern New South Wales clubs from level 4 entered this stage.
- 81 Victorian clubs (57 from the previous round and 24 teams from level 6 and below) entered this stage.
- 30 Western Australian clubs from level 5 and below entered this stage.

- Third round:

- 12 Australian Capital Territory clubs from level 3 and below entered this stage.
- 88 New South Wales Clubs (66 from the previous round and 22 teams from levels 4–5) entered this stage.
- 42 Northern New South Wales clubs (33 from the previous round and 11 level 3) entered this stage.
- 83 Queensland clubs (50 from the previous round and 33 teams from level 4 and below) entered this stage.
- 36 South Australian clubs from level 3 and below entered this stage.
- 10 Tasmanian clubs from level 3 and below entered this stage.
- 86 Victorian clubs (38 from the previous round and 48 teams from level 3–4) entered this stage.
- 42 Western Australian clubs (18 from the previous round and 24 teams from levels 3 and 4) entered this stage.

- Fourth round:

- 16 Australian Capital Territory clubs (4 from the previous round and 12 teams from levels 2–3) entered this stage.
- 64 New South Wales Clubs (44 from the previous round and 20 teams from levels 2–3) entered this stage.
- 32 Northern New South Wales clubs (20 from the previous round and 12 teams from level 2) entered this stage.
- 11 Northern Territory clubs (7 from Norzone (Darwin) and 4 from FICA (Alice Springs)) from levels 2–3 entered this stage.
- 64 Queensland clubs (42 from the previous round and 22 teams from level 2 and 3) entered this stage.
- 32 South Australian clubs (21 from the previous round and 11 teams from level 2) entered this stage.
- 16 Tasmanian clubs (6 from the previous round and 10 teams from level 2 and 3) entered this stage.
- 78 Victorian clubs (43 from the previous round and 35 teams from levels 2–4) entered this stage.
- 32 Western Australian clubs (21 from the previous round and 11 teams from level 2) entered this stage.

- Fifth round:

- 8 Australian Capital Territory clubs progressed to this stage.
- 32 New South Wales clubs progressed to this stage.
- 16 Northern New South Wales clubs progressed to this stage.
- 8 Northern Territory clubs (6 from the previous round and 2 Norzone (Darwin) teams from level 2) entered this stage.
- 32 Queensland clubs progressed to this stage.
- 16 South Australian clubs progressed to this stage.
- 8 Tasmanian clubs progressed to this stage.
- 40 Victorian clubs progressed to this stage.
- 16 Western Australian clubs progressed to this stage.

- Sixth round:

- 4 Australian Capital Territory clubs progressed to this stage.
- 16 New South Wales clubs progressed to this stage.
- 8 Northern New South Wales clubs progressed to this stage.
- 4 Northern Territory clubs progressed to this stage.
- 16 Queensland clubs progressed to this stage.
- 8 South Australian clubs progressed to this stage.
- 4 Tasmanian clubs progressed to this stage.
- 20 Victorian clubs progressed to this stage.
- 8 Western Australian clubs progressed to this stage.

- Seventh round:

- 2 Australian Capital Territory clubs progressed to this stage, which doubled as the Final of the Federation Cup.
- 8 New South Wales clubs progressed to this stage. The 4 winners also qualified for the final rounds of the Waratah Cup.
- 4 Northern New South Wales clubs progressed to this stage. The 2 winners also qualified for the Final of the NNSWF State Cup.
- 2 Northern Territory clubs progressed to this stage, which doubled as the Final of the NT Australia Cup.
- 8 Queensland clubs progressed to this stage; 1 from Central and North Queensland, and 7 from South East Queensland.
- 4 South Australian clubs progressed to this stage. The 2 winners also qualified for the Final of the Federation Cup.
- 2 Tasmanian clubs progressed to this stage, which doubled as the Grand Final of the Milan Lakoseljac Cup.
- 10 Victorian clubs progressed to this stage. The 5 winners also qualified for the final rounds of the Dockerty Cup.
- 4 Western Australian clubs progressed to this stage. The 2 winners also qualified for the Final of the Football West State Cup.

- Play-off round:

- The four lowest-ranked teams in the 2022–23 A-League Men played-off for two spots in the Round of 32.

== Key to abbreviations ==
Federation	Zone
ACT = Australian Capital Territory	
NSW = New South Wales	
NNSW = Northern New South Wales	NTH = North; STH = South
NT = Northern Territory	ASP = Alice Springs; DAR = Darwin
QLD = Queensland	CC = Central Coast; FNG = Far North and Gulf; MTI = Mt Isa; NTH = Northern; REG = Regional Queensland; SEQ = South East Queensland; WB = Wide Bay; WC = Whitsunday Coast
SA = South Australia	
TAS = Tasmania	
VIC = Victoria	
WA = Western Australia	

== Preliminary round ==
Fed.	Zone	Tie no	Home team (Tier)	Score	Away team (Tier)
Queensland
QLD	NTH	1	Ingham (5)	0–4	Burdekin FC (5)

Notes

- QLD Byes: Brothers Townsville (5), Estates FC (5), MA Olympic (5), Rebels FC (5), Riverway JCU (5), Saints Eagles Souths (5), Townsville Warriors (5).

== First round ==
Fed.	Zone	Tie no	Home team (Tier)	Score	Away team (Tier)
Queensland
QLD	CC	1	Frenchville (5)	3–0	Southside United (5)
QLD	NTH	2	Rebels FC (5)	3–3†	Estates FC (5)
Estates FC advance 6–5 on penalties
QLD	NTH	3	MA Olympic (5)	5–1	Riverway JCU (5)
QLD	NTH	4	Townsville Warriors (5)	1–0	Brothers Townsville (5)
QLD	NTH	5	Burdekin FC (5)	2–1	Saints Eagles Souths (5)
Victoria
VIC	–	6	Albert Park (8)	2–2†	Keysborough (8)
Keysborough advance 3–2 on penalties
VIC	–	7	Chelsea (8)	1–4	St Kilda (9)
VIC	–	8	Glen Waverley (9)	2–0	Northern Falcons FC (8)
VIC	–	9	Sunbury United (7)	w/o	Falcons 2000 SC (10)
VIC	–	10	Greenvale United (8)	w/o	Golden Plains (9)
VIC	–	11	Lyndale United (8)	2–2†	Swinburne University (13)
Swinburne University advance 5–3 on penalties
VIC	–	12	Alphington (9)	1–3†	Noble Hurricanes (8)
VIC	–	13	Middle Park (7)	7–1	ETA Buffalo (9)
VIC	–	14	Reservoir United (12)	0–3	Mentone (9)
VIC	–	15	Knox United (9)	2–1†	Gisborne (8)
VIC	–	16	Sandringham SC (8)	1–4	Monbulk Rangers (7)
VIC	–	17	Barton United (9)	3–9	Uni Hill Eagles (8)
VIC	–	18	Heidelberg Stars (9)	3–0	Bunyip District (9)
VIC	–	19	Deakin Ducks (9)	1–7	Plenty Valley Lions (8)
VIC	–	20	Croydon City (8)	2–1	Fawkner SC (7)
VIC	–	21	Mount Waverley City (9)	0–0†	Fortuna 60 (10)
Fortuna 60 advance 5–4 on penalties
VIC	–	22	Dandenong South (8)	4–1	Moonee Valley Knights (8)
VIC	–	23	Meadow Park (9)	1–5	Sebastapol Vikings (7)
VIC	–	24	White Star Dandenong (8)	4–2	Noble Park (9)
VIC	–	25	Keilor Wolves (8)	5–1	Aspendale (9)
VIC	–	26	Watsonia Heights (8)	5–0	Moreland United (7)
VIC	–	27	Bundoora United (8)	0–1	Bayside Argonauts (7)
VIC	–	28	Moonee Ponds United (8)	3–0	Whitehorse United (8)
VIC	–	29	Williamstown (7)	2–0	Balmoral (9)

Fed.	Zone	Tie no	Home team (Tier)	Score	Away team (Tier)
VIC	–	30	Tatura (10)	11–1	Pakenham United (9)
VIC	–	31	La Trobe University (8)	1–0	Seaford United (9)
VIC	–	32	Melton Phoenix (9)	8–0	Mitchell Rangers (9)
VIC	–	33	Springvale City (8)	2–0	Bendigo City (9)
VIC	–	34	Mount Martha (9)	6–5	Tullamarine (9)
VIC	–	35	Lilydale Montrose United (9)	1–6	Monash City Villarreal (8)
VIC	–	36	Manningham Juventus (8)	4–2	Breakwater Eagles (10)
VIC	–	37	Diamond Valley United SC (7)	3–2	Kings Domain (8)
VIC	–	38	Templestowe Wolves (9)	3–1	South Yarra (7)
VIC	–	39	Endeavour United (8)	7–1	Yarra Jets (9)
VIC	–	40	Riversdale SC (8)	3–0	Old Melburnians (9)
VIC	–	41	Ballarat (9)	0–5	Laverton (8)
VIC	–	42	Glenroy Lions (9)	3–1	Wyndham (9)
VIC	–	43	Ringwood City SC (8)	3–3†	Melbourne University (8)
Ringwood City advance 5–4 on penalties
VIC	–	44	Surf Coast FC (8)	3–0	Maidstone United (9)
VIC	–	45	Craigieburn City (7)	1–2	Melbourne City (8)
VIC	–	46	Epsom (10)	5–4	Darebin United SC (8)
VIC	–	47	Point Cook (7)	w/o	East Bentleigh (8)
VIC	–	48	Spring Hills (8)	1–0	Old Trinity Grammarians (9)
VIC	–	49	Keon Park (9)	w/o	Thornbury Athletic FC (8)
VIC	–	50	Ballarat North United (10)	1–6	East Kew (9)
VIC	–	51	Rowville Eagles (7)	9–0	Roxburgh Park United (9)
VIC	–	52	Shepparton South (10)	w/o	Old Xaverians SC (8)
VIC	–	53	North Melbourne Athletic (8)	2–0	Brunswick Zebras FC (8)
VIC	–	54	Truganina Hornets (9)	2–0	Boronia (9)
VIC	–	55	Glen Eira (14)	1–7	Baxter (8)
VIC	–	56	Tarneit United (9)	2–1	Doreen United (9)
VIC	–	57	Barnstoneworth United (8)	2–1†	West Preston (8)
VIC	–	58	Mildura City (10)	w/o	Brighton SC (7)
VIC	–	59	St Albans Gospic Bears (11)	1–5	Sandown Lions (8)
VIC	–	60	Monash University (7)	10–0	Maribyrnong Greens (9)
VIC	–	61	West Point (9)	2–1	Waverley Wanderers (8)
VIC	–	62	Lara United (9)	7–2	Old Ivanhoe SC (9)

Notes

- w/o = Walkover
- † = After Extra Time
- QLD Byes: Bluebirds FC (5), Capricorn Coast (5), Central FC (5).
- VIC Byes: Asburton United (7), Barwon (8), Bell Park (8), Border Raiders (11), Casey Panthers (9), Chisholm United (7), Elwood City (7), Hampton Park United Sparrows (9), Heidelberg Eagles (7), Mount Eliza (9), Noble Park United (7), Rosebud (9), Sale United (10), Shepparton United (10), Somerville Eagles (8), St Kevins Old Boys (9), Surfside Waves (9), Western Eagles (7), Westside Strikers Caroline Springs (7).

== Second round ==
Fed.	Zone	Tie no	Home team (Tier)	Score	Away team (Tier)
New South Wales
NSW	–	1	Narellan Rangers (-)	1–3	Woy Woy FC (-)
NSW	–	2	Liverpool Rangers (-)	0–2	Hanwood FC (-)
NSW	–	3	Kellyville Kolts (-)	13–0	Harrington United FC (-)
NSW	–	4	Como Jannali (-)	4–0	Enfield Rovers (-)
NSW	–	5	Gunners SC (-)	1–5	Brighton Heat (-)
NSW	–	6	Terrigal United (5)	7–1	North Ryde (6)
NSW	–	7	Hurstville Glory (6)	1–3	Balmain & District (-)
NSW	–	8	Randwick City (-)	1–0	Austral SC (-)
NSW	–	9	Hurstville City Minotaurs (5)	1–4	Kanwal FC (-)
NSW	–	10	Pittwater RSL (-)	6–0	Blue Mountains FC (-)
NSW	–	11	Wollongong Olympic (5)	3–0	Doyalson-Wyee (-)
NSW	–	12	Gymea United (-)	3–2	Glebe Wanderers (-)
NSW	–	13	Kogarah Waratahs (-)	0–1	Sans Souci FC (-)
NSW	–	14	Holroyd Rangers (-)	2–2†	Fairfield Bulls (5)
Fairfield Bulls advance 4–2 on penalties
NSW	–	15	IFS Community Wolves (-)	0–5	Eschol Park (-)
NSW	–	16	Bexley North (-)	3–1†	Mascot Kings (-)
NSW	–	17	St Georges Basin (-)	1–3	Castle Hill RSL Rockets (-)
NSW	–	18	Gerringong Breakers (-)	5–0	Bass Hill Rangers (-)
NSW	–	19	Central Sydney Wolves (-)	0–3	Waverley Old Boys (5)
NSW	–	20	Doonside Hawks (-)	2–1	Eastern Creek Pioneer (-)
NSW	–	21	Gladesville Ravens (6)	0–3	Glebe Gorillas (-)
NSW	–	22	Glenwood Redbacks (-)	0–8	Rouse Hill Rams (-)
NSW	–	23	Forest Rangers (-)	4–0	Georges River Thistle (-)
NSW	–	24	Moorebank Sports (5)	2–1	Barnstoneworth United (5)
NSW	–	25	Parklea SFC (-)	0–7	Kissing Point (-)
NSW	–	26	Berkeley Vale (5)	6–1	Orana Spurs (6)
NSW	–	27	East Gosford (-)	15–0	Albion Park City FC (-)
NSW	–	28	Roselea FC (6)	4–1	Miranda Magpies (-)
NSW	–	29	Peakhurst United (-)	1–4	Woongarrah FC (5)
NSW	–	30	Fairfield Eagles (-)	0–4	ACU FC (-)
NSW	–	31	Panorama FC (-)	0–2	Norwest FC (-)
NSW	–	32	Chatswood Rangers (-)	4–3	Hurlstone Park (-)
NSW	–	33	Narrabeen FC (-)	6–1	Kellyville United (-)
NSW	–	34	Coledale Waves Junior (-)	1–2	Workers FC (-)
NSW	–	35	Helensburgh Thistle (-)	6–3	Tarrawanna Blueys (5)
NSW	–	36	Ourimbah United (6)	6–0	Yoogali FC (5)
NSW	–	37	Belrose Terrey Hills Raiders (-)	w/o	Lithgow Workmens (-)
NSW	–	38	West Pymble (-)	2–3	Shellharbour FC (-)
NSW	–	39	Putney Rangers (6)	1–7	Unanderra Hearts (6)
NSW	–	40	Western Condors (5)	4–5	Bonnet Bay (5)
NSW	–	41	Normanhurst Eagles (-)	5–0	Georges River (-)
NSW	–	42	Orange Waratah (-)	3–0	St Patrick's FC (-)
NSW	–	43	Bulli FC (5)	5–0	Liverpool Olympic (5)
NSW	–	44	Fairfield Pats (-)	2–1	The Ponds (-)
NSW	–	45	Marulan FC (-)	5–2	St Ives FC (-)
NSW	–	46	Carlton Rovers (-)	1–2	Lane Cove (-)
NSW	–	47	Lokomotiv Cove (-)	2–4	Marayong FC (-)
NSW	–	48	Glenmore Park (-)	2–6	Oran Park Rovers (-)
NSW	–	49	Quakers Hill Junior (-)	3–1	Thirroul Junior (-)
NSW	–	50	Lindfield FC (-)	3–1	Coniston FC (-)
NSW	–	51	Bankstown Sports Strikers (-)	6–0	Cranebrook United (-)
NSW	–	52	Macquarie Dragons (5)	4–2†	Kemps Creek United (5)
NSW	–	53	Coogee United (5)	3–0	Banksia Tigers (-)
Northern New South Wales
NNSW	NTH	54	Alstonville (-)	9–0	Urunga (-)
NNSW	NTH	55	Lismore Richmond Rovers (4)	3–0	Camden Haven Redbacks (-)
NNSW	NTH	56	Bellingen (-)	1–5	Oxley Vale Attunga (-)
NNSW	NTH	57	South Armidale United (-)	4–2	Narrabri (-)
NNSW	NTH	58	Coffs City United (4)	0–5	Bangalow (-)
NNSW	NTH	59	Inverell (-)	1–2	Woolgoolga United (-)
NNSW	NTH	60	Lake Cathie (-)	2–1	Sawtell & Districts (-)
NNSW	NTH	61	Port Macquarie United (-)	2–0	Maclean (-)
NNSW	NTH	62	Westlawn Tigers (-)	1–1†	Northern Storm (-)
Northern Storm advance 4–2 on penalties
NNSW	NTH	63	Moore Creek (-)	1–1†	Port Saints (-)
Port Saints advance 4–2 on penalties
NNSW	NTH	64	Demon Knights (-)	0–3	Coffs Coast Tigers (4)
NNSW	NTH	65	East Armidale (-)	w/o	Southern United (6)
NNSW	STH	66	Bolwarra Lorn Junior (5)	6–0	Garden Suburb (-)
NNSW	STH	67	Kurri Kurri (7)	0–2	Dudley Redhead United Senior (4)
NNSW	STH	68	Kotara South (4)	4–1	North United Wolves (5)
NNSW	STH	69	Stockton Sharks (5)	1–3	Swansea (4)
NNSW	STH	70	Nelson Bay (5)	2–2†	Minmi Wanderers (4)
Nelson Bay advance 5–4 on penalties
NNSW	STH	71	Mayfield United Senior (4)	4–1	Greta Branxton (6)
NNSW	STH	72	Warners Bay (4)	3–2	Mayfield United Junior (6)
NNSW	STH	73	Hamilton Azzurri (4)	2–0	New Lambton Junior (-)
NNSW	STH	74	Medowie (6)	1–2	Barnsley United (6)
NNSW	STH	75	Newcastle Suns (4)	w/o	Lake Macquarie (5)
NNSW	STH	76	Merewether Advance (5)	0–13	Newcastle Croatia (5)
Queensland
QLD	CC	77	Capricorn Coast (5)	0–7	Frenchville FC (5)
QLD	CC	78	Bluebirds FC (5)	0–7	Central FC (5)

Fed.	Zone	Tie no	Home team (Tier)	Score	Away team (Tier)
QLD	FNG	79	Leichhardt (5)	3–0	Innisfail United (5)
QLD	FNG	80	Stratford Dolphins (5)	3–3	Mareeba United (5)
Mareeba United advance 3–1 on penalties
QLD	FNG	81	Edge Hill United (5)	2–1†	Marlin Coast Rangers (5)
QLD	FNG	82	Southside Comets (5)	9–0	Atherton (6)
QLD	MTI	83	Parkside (-)	6–5†	Atlas (-)
QLD	MTI	84	Isaroos (-)	w/o	Sandfire Bulls (-)
QLD	NTH	85	Estates FC (5)	2–4	MA Olympic (5)
QLD	NTH	86	Burdekin FC (5)	1–0†	Townsville Warriors (5)
QLD	WB	87	Across the Waves (5)	2–0	Fraser Flames (5)
QLD	WC	88	Mackay Rangers (5)	0–3	Mackay Wanderers (5)
QLD	WC	89	Magpies FC (5)	w/o	Dolphins FC (6)
QLD	SEQ	90	Ipswich City Bulls (-)	7–3†	Jimboomba United (-)
QLD	SEQ	91	Brighton Bulldogs (-)	1–7	Logan Metro (-)
QLD	SEQ	92	Mt. Gravatt Hawks (-)	1–0	Pacific Pines (-)
QLD	SEQ	93	New Farm United (-)	3–2	Bayside United (-)
QLD	SEQ	94	Noosa Lions (-)	2–3	Tarragindi Tigers (-)
QLD	SEQ	95	Tweed United (-)	5–5†	The Gap FC (-)
The Gap advance 4–2 on penalties
QLD	SEQ	96	Oxley United (-)	0–3	Yeronga Eagles (-)
QLD	SEQ	97	Slacks Creek (-)	0–8	Ormeau (-)
QLD	SEQ	98	Logan Village (-)	8–0	Pimpama (-)
QLD	SEQ	99	Brisbane Knights (-)	5–0	Rockville Rovers (-)
QLD	SEQ	100	Bribie Island (-)	1–4	Kawana (-)
QLD	SEQ	101	West Wanderers (-)	4–4†	Mooroondu (-)
Mooroondu advance 4–2 on penalties
QLD	SEQ	102	Pine Hills (-)	4–2	Western Spirit (-)
QLD	SEQ	103	Springfield United (-)	4–3	Kingscliff Wolves (-)
QLD	SEQ	104	Woombye Snakes (-)	0–5	Southport (-)
QLD	SEQ	105	Musgrave Mustangs (-)	3–0	Gatton Redbacks (-)
Victoria
VIC	–	106	Keysborough (8)	1–4	White Star Dandenong (8)
VIC	–	107	St Kilda (9)	†1–1	Laverton (8)
St Kilda advance 4–3 on penalties
VIC	–	108	Shepparton South (10)	w/o	Elwood City (7)
VIC	–	109	Border Raiders (11)	w/o	Casey Panthers (9)
VIC	–	110	North Melbourne Athletic (8)	w/o	Mount Martha (9)
VIC	–	111	Melbourne City (8)	2–0	Thornbury Athletic FC (8)
VIC	–	112	Templestowe Wolves (9)	3–2	Mentone (9)
VIC	–	113	Riversdale SC (8)	3–4	Diamond Valley United SC (7)
VIC	–	114	Plenty Valley Lions (8)	1–2	Bayside Argonauts (7)
VIC	–	115	Endeavour United (8)	1–0	Baxter (8)
VIC	–	116	Noble Hurricanes (8)	2–2†	Glenroy Lions (9)
Glenroy Lions advance 5–4 on penalties
VIC	–	117	St Kevins Old Boys (9)	1–1†	Monash University (7)
Monash University advance 4–2 on penalties
VIC	–	118	Ringwood City (8)	3–1	Knox United (9)
VIC	–	119	Surf Coast FC (8)	1–1†	Rowville Eagles (7)
Rowville Eagles advance 5–4 on penalties
VIC	–	120	Williamstown (7)	3–0	Springvale City (8)
VIC	–	121	Ashburton United (7)	3–1	East Kew (9)
VIC	–	122	Sale United (10)	3–2	Swinburne University (13)
VIC	–	123	Sebastopol Vikings (7)	1–0	Western Eagles (7)
VIC	–	124	Shepparton United (10)	1–2	Sunbury United (7)
VIC	–	125	Surfside Waves (9)	w/o	Watsonia Heights (8)
VIC	–	126	Rosebud (9)	w/o	Bell Park (8)
VIC	–	127	West Point (9)	0–2	Truganina Hornets (8)
VIC	–	128	Monbulk Rangers (7)	0–1	Monash City Villarreal (8)
VIC	–	129	Sandown Lions (8)	1–1†	Moonee Ponds United (7)
Moonee Ponds United advance 3–1 on penalties
VIC	–	130	Noble Park United (7)	0–1	Greenvale United (8)
VIC	–	131	Manningham Juventus (8)	4–2	Somerville Eagles (8)
VIC	–	132	Glen Waverley (9)	2–3	Keilor Wolves (8)
VIC	–	133	Middle Park (7)	0–2	Dandenong South (8)
VIC	–	134	Heidelberg Stars (9)	2–3	Melton Phoenix (9)
VIC	–	135	Uni Hill Eagles (8)	4–1	Fortuna 60 (10)
VIC	–	136	Croydon City (8)	7–1	Tarneit United (9)
VIC	–	137	Heidelberg Eagles (7)	w/o	Mildura City (10)
VIC	–	138	Barnstoneworth United (8)	3–2	Hampton Park United Sparrows (9)
VIC	–	139	Tatura (10)	3–2	Point Cook (7)
VIC	–	140	La Trobe University (8)	1–0	Barwon (8)
VIC	–	141	Westside Strikers Caroline Springs (7)	0–2	Chisholm United (7)
VIC	–	142	Mount Eliza (9)	0–5	Epsom (10)
VIC	–	143	Spring Hills (8)	0–1	Lara United (9)
Western Australia
WA	–	144	Woodvale FC (8)	3–1	Spearwood Dalmatinac (8)
WA	–	145	Black Stars (10)	0–2	Perth Royals (8)
WA	–	146	Dunsborough Town (-)	0–3	Wembley Downs (5)
WA	–	147	Cracovia SC (7)	5–2	Chipolopolo (10)
WA	–	148	Port Kennedy (6)	3–0	Northern City (8)
WA	–	149	North Beach (5)	3–2	Joondanna Blues (8)
WA	–	150	Tigris FC (7)	0–3	Jaguar FC (5)
WA	–	151	Southern Spirit (-)	3–4	Perth AFC (7)
WA	–	152	Kwinana United (5)	3–0	Geographe Bay (-)
WA	–	153	Hamersley United (6)	4–1	Armadale Christian FC (-)
WA	–	154	North Perth United (5)	3–1	Bunbury Dynamos (-)
WA	–	155	Kelmscott Roos (5)	1–2	South Perth United (5)

Notes

- w/o = Walkover
- † = After Extra Time
- NSW Byes: Lithgow Workmens (–).
- NNSW Byes: Armidale City Westside (–), Hillvue Rovers (–), Kempsey Saints (–), Lambton Jaffas Junior (6), Newcastle University (5), South Maitland (5), Tamworth (–), Westlakes Wildcats (4).
- QLD Byes: Acacia Ridge (–), ACU (–), Annerley FC (–), Bardon Latrobe (–), Beerwah Glasshouse (–), Bethania Rams (–), Bilambil Terranora (–), Burleigh Bulldogs (–), Caloundra (–), AC Carina (–), Centenary Stormers (–), Coomera Colts (–), Deception Bay (–), Doon Villa (–), Highfields FC (–), Kangaroo Point Rovers (–), Legends FC (-), Logan Roos (–), Mackay Lions (–), Moggill FC (–), Murwillumbah FC (–), Nambour Yandina (–), Narangba Eagles (-), Nerang (-), Newmarket (-), North Brisbane (-), North Pine (-), FC Oldbridge (-), ParkRidge (–), Pine Rivers Athletic (–), Redcliffe Dolphins (–), Ridge Hills (–), Ripley Valley (–), Robina City (–), Runaway Bay (–), St. Albans FC (–), UQFC (–), Virginia United (–), Westside Grovely (–), Whitsunday United (–), Willowburn (-).
- WA Byes : Ballajura AFC (7), Busselton City (–), Eaton Dardanup (–), Football Margaret River (–), Noranda City (8), Peel United (5).

== Third round ==
Fed.	Zone	Tie no	Home team (Tier)	Score	Away team (Tier)
Australian Capital Territory
ACT	–	1	Canberra White Eagles (3)	0–1	Weston Molonglo (3)
ACT	–	2	Yarabi FC (-)	0–4	Yoogali SC (3)
ACT	–	3	Belconnen United (3)	3–2	Queanbeyan City (3)
ACT	–	4	ANU (3)	3–1	UC Stars (4)
ACT	–	5	Woden Valley (4)	1–7	Belnorth (4)
ACT	–	6	Burns FC (6)	0–7	Brindabella Blues (3)
New South Wales
NSW	–	7	Kanwal FC (-)	2–3†	Western Rage (4)
NSW	–	8	UNSW FC (4)	1–4	Lindfield FC (-)
NSW	–	9	Unanderra Hearts (6)	1–0	Southern Ettalong (5)
NSW	–	10	Bankstown Sports Strikers (-)	0–3	Avoca FC (-)
NSW	–	11	Wollongong Olympic (5)	3–0	Ourimbah United (6)
NSW	–	12	Como Jannali (-)	3–2	Gladesville Ryde Magic (4)
NSW	–	13	Phoenix FC (-)	2–1	Greenacre Eagles (-)
NSW	–	14	Castle Hill RSL Rockets (-)	0–5	Hakoah Sydney City East (2)
NSW	–	15	Hawkesbury City (4)	4–3	East Gosford (-)
NSW	–	16	Bonnet Bay (-)	1–2	Doonside Hawks (-)
NSW	–	17	Brighton Heat (-)	6–1	Gymea United (-)
NSW	–	18	Bonnyrigg White Eagles (2)	3–0	LFC Sports (-)
NSW	–	19	Lithgow Workmens (-)	w/o	Gerringong Breakers (-)
NSW	–	20	Cringila Lions (5)	8–1	Woongarrah FC (5)
NSW	–	21	Auburn FC (-)	0–8	Hurstville FC (4)
NSW	–	22	Macarthur Rams (3)	3–1	Lane Cove (-)
NSW	–	23	Winston Hills Bears (-)	1–2†	Canterbury Bankstown (3)
NSW	–	24	Rouse Hill Rams (-)	2–0	Eschol Park (-)
NSW	–	25	Roselands FC (-)	0–9	Fraser Park (4)
NSW	–	26	Oran Park Rovers (-)	0–4	Sydney University (4)
NSW	–	27	Forest Killarney (-)	2–3	Bankstown United (4)
NSW	–	28	Mounties Wanderers (3)	16–0	Bowral FC (-)
NSW	–	29	West Ryde Rovers (-)	1–10	Rydalmere Lions (3)
NSW	–	30	Orange Waratah (-)	1–5	Central Coast United (3)
NSW	–	31	Wollongong United (5)	2–2†	Shellharbour FC (-)
Shellharbour FC advance 4–3 on penalties
NSW	–	32	St George FC (3)	3–0	Hanwood FC (-)
NSW	–	33	Parramatta FC (4)	3–1†	Sans Souci FC (-)
NSW	–	34	ACU FC (-)	0–5	South Coast Flame (4)
NSW	–	35	Balmain & District (-)	1–2†	Dulwich Hill (3)
NSW	–	36	Northbridge FC (5)	5–3	Cronulla Seagulls (-)
NSW	–	37	Bexley North (-)	1–5	Narrabeen FC (-)
NSW	–	38	Bulli FC (5)	2–1	Nepean FC (4)
NSW	–	39	Berkeley Vale (5)	3–1	Coogee United (5)
NSW	–	40	Kellyville Kolts (-)	2–1	Woy Woy FC (-)
NSW	–	41	Bathurst '75 (6)	0–3	Albion Park White Eagles (5)
NSW	–	42	Moorebank Sports (5)	3–4†	Randwick City (-)
NSW	–	43	Chatswood Rangers (-)	0–3	Forest Rangers (-)
NSW	–	44	Camden Tigers (4)	2–4	Blacktown Spartans (3)
NSW	–	45	Macquarie Dragons (5)	2–0†	Workers FC (-)
NSW	–	46	Helensburgh Thistle (-)	6–3	Normanhurst Eagles (-)
NSW	–	47	Wyoming FC (5)	4–2	Fairfield Bulls (5)
NSW	–	48	Arncliffe Aurora (-)	1–3	SD Raiders (3)
NSW	–	49	Quakers Hill Junior (-)	7–1	Marrickville FC (-)
NSW	–	50	Fairfield Pats (-)	0–9	Prospect United (4)
NSW	–	51	Marulan FC (-)	0–6	Northern Tigers (3)
NSW	–	52	Kissing Point (-)	1–7	Inter Lions (3)
NSW	–	53	Inner West Hawks (4)	2–1	Hills United (3)
NSW	–	54	Roselea FC (6)	2–1	Ryde Saints United (5)
NSW	–	55	Dunbar Rovers (3)	2–1	Glebe Gorillas (-)
NSW	–	56	Norwest FC (-)	2–0	Bankstown City (3)
NSW	–	57	Waverley Old Boys (5)	2–1	Marayong FC (-)
NSW	–	58	Pittwater RSL (-)	1–2	Terrigal United (-)
Northern New South Wales
NNSW	NTH	59	Oxley Vale Attunga (-)	w/o	Kempsey Saints (-)
NNSW	NTH	60	Tamworth (-)	0–7	Alstonville (-)
NNSW	NTH	61	Woolgoolga United (-)	6–0	Lake Cathie (-)
NNSW	NTH	62	Lismore Richmond Rovers (4)	w/o	Port Macquarie United (-)
NNSW	NTH	63	Armidale City Westside (-)	0–7	Bangalow (-)
NNSW	NTH	64	Coffs Coast Tigers (4)	12–0	Hillvue Rovers (-)
NNSW	NTH	65	East Armidale (-)	w/o	Port Saints (-)
NNSW	NTH	66	South Armidale United (-)	1–2	Northern Storm (-)
NNSW	STH	67	Belmont Swansea United (3)	2–0	Mayfield United Senior (4)
NNSW	STH	68	Kahibah (3)	4–2	Hamilton Azzurri (4)
NNSW	STH	69	Warners Bay (4)	2–3	Toronto Awaba Stags (3)
NNSW	STH	70	Wallsend (3)	1–0	Bolwarra Lorn Junior (5)
NNSW	STH	71	Swansea (4)	1–2	West Wallsend (3)
NNSW	STH	72	Cessnock City Hornets (3)	10–0	Newcastle University (5)
NNSW	STH	73	Newcastle Suns (4)	6–3	South Maitland (5)
NNSW	STH	74	Lambton Jaffas Junior (6)	3–1	Barnsley United (6)
NNSW	STH	75	Westlakes Wildcats (4)	1–4	South Cardiff (3)
NNSW	STH	76	Nelson Bay (5)	0–2	Kotara South (4)
NNSW	STH	77	Newcastle Croatia (5)	2–5	Singleton Strikers (3)
NNSW	STH	78	Thornton Redbacks (3)	0–4	Dudley Redhead United Senior (4)
Queensland
QLD	CC	79	Central FC (5)	1–6	Frenchville FC (5)
QLD	FNG	80	Mareeba United (5)	2–0	Southside Comets (5)
QLD	FNG	81	Leichhardt FC (5)	1–3	Edge Hill United (5)
QLD	MTI	82	Isaroos (-)	1–2	Parkside (-)
QLD	NTH	83	MA Olympic (5)	3–2	Burdekin FC (5)
QLD	WB	84	Doon Villa (5)	2–5	Across the Waves (5)
QLD	WC	85	Magpies FC (5)	0–2	Whitsunday United (5)
QLD	WC	86	Mackay Lions (5)	2–0	Mackay Wanderers (5)
QLD	SEQ	87	Willowburn (-)	4–2	Robina City (-)
QLD	SEQ	88	Yeronga Eagles (-)	5–1	ACU (-)
QLD	SEQ	89	Holland Park Hawks (-)	9–1	Pine Rivers Athletic (-)
QLD	SEQ	90	Legends FC (-)	0–10	Magic United (-)
QLD	SEQ	91	North Star (-)	2–0	Virginia United (-)
QLD	SEQ	92	Narangba Eagles (-)	2–1	Bardon Latrobe (-)
QLD	SEQ	93	Moggill FC (-)	3–8†	Caloundra (-)
QLD	SEQ	94	Musgrave Mustangs (-)	6–1	Beerwah Glasshouse (-)
QLD	SEQ	95	Tarragindi Tigers (-)	0–9	Broadbeach United (-)
QLD	SEQ	96	Logan Village (-)	2–2†	Newmarket (-)
Logan Village advance 3–1 on penalties
QLD	SEQ	97	Samford Rangers (-)	3–0	Redcliffe Dolphins (-)
QLD	SEQ	98	Mooroondu (-)	3–3	Park Ridge (-)
QLD	SEQ	100	St. George Willawong (-)	4–1	Pine Hills (-)
Mooroondu advance 4–3 on penalties
QLD	SEQ	99	Springfield (-)	2–3	North Brisbane (-)

Fed.	Zone	Tie no	Home team (Tier)	Score	Away team (Tier)
QLD	SEQ	101	New Farm United (-)	3–0	Annerley FC (-)
QLD	SEQ	102	Runaway Bay (-)	6–1	Westside Grovely (-)
QLD	SEQ	103	North Pine (-)	2–1	Acacia Ridge (-)
QLD	SEQ	104	UQFC (-)	4–3	Centenary Stormers (-)
QLD	SEQ	105	Kangaroo Point Rovers (-)	0–1	Ipswich Knights (-)
QLD	SEQ	106	Ripley Valley (-)	5–0	Highfields FC (-)
QLD	SEQ	107	North Lakes United (-)	1–3	Burleigh Bulldogs (-)
QLD	SEQ	108	Logan Roos (-)	2–6	Brisbane Knights (-)
QLD	SEQ	109	Grange Thistle (-)	0–1	Taringa Rovers (-)
QLD	SEQ	110	Bilambil Terranora (-)	2–5	The Gap FC(-)
QLD	SEQ	111	Ridge Hills (-)	4–5	Nambour Yandina (-)
QLD	SEQ	112	Deception Bay (-)	1–3	Coomera Colts (-)
QLD	SEQ	113	Ipswich Bulls (-)	3–2	FC Old Bridge (-)
QLD	SEQ	114	Bethania Rams (-)	1–5	Souths United (-)
QLD	SEQ	115	Southport (-)	4–3	Mt. Gravatt Hawks (-)
QLD	SEQ	116	Kawana (-)	1–2	AC Carina (-)
QLD	SEQ	117	St. Albans FC (-)	2–0	Murwillumbah FC (-)
QLD	SEQ	118	Logan Metro (-)	7–1	Nerang FC (-)
South Australia
SA	–	119	Adelaide University Grads Blue (5)	2–0	Pembroke Old Scholars (5)
SA	–	120	Para Hills East (-)	0–3	Eastern United (3)
SA	–	121	Rostrevor Old Collegians (5)	1–2	Western Strikers (4)
SA	–	122	Pitbulls (-)	0–4	Modbury Vista (4)
SA	–	123	Playford City Patriots (3)	1–0	Adelaide Victory (3)
SA	–	124	Cumberland United (3)	7–0	Para Hills West (-)
SA	–	125	Port Adelaide Pirates (3)	1–2	Vipers (3)
SA	–	126	Adelaide Blue Eagles (3)	2–1	Adelaide Hills Hawks (4)
SA	–	127	Seaford Rangers (4)	1–1†	Fulham United (3)
Seaford Rangers advance 5–4 on penalties
SA	–	128	The Cove (4)	2–3	Northern Demons (4)
SA	–	129	Ghan United (-)	5–3	Para Hills Knights (3)
SA	–	130	Mount Barker United (4)	1–2	Adelaide University (4)
SA	–	131	Gawler Eagles (4)	0–4	West Torrens Birkalla (3)
SA	–	132	Naracoorte United (5)	0–5	Adelaide Cobras (3)
Tasmania
TAS	–	133	Hobart United (3)	5–1	Somerset (3)
TAS	–	134	Metro FC (3)	2–4	Taroona (3)
Victoria
VIC	–	135	Diamond Valley United (7)	4–1†	Casey Panthers (9)
VIC	–	136	Mazenod (6)	1–2	Bayside Argonauts (7)
VIC	–	137	Ringwood City (8)	3–1	Sebastopol Vikings (7)
VIC	–	138	Old Scotch (5)	7–2	Rowville Eagles (7)
VIC	–	139	Greenvale United (8)	2–0	North Melbourne Athletic (8)
VIC	–	140	Corio (5)	1–0†	Western Suburbs (6)
VIC	–	141	Brandon Park (6)	4–3†	Altona East Phoenix (6)
VIC	–	142	Epping City (6)	4–0	Rosebud (9)
VIC	–	143	Whittlesea United (5)	1–0	Albion Rovers (6)
VIC	–	144	St Kilda SC (8)	1–4	Croydon City (8)
VIC	–	145	Altona North (6)	2–3	Hampton East Brighton (6)
VIC	–	146	Brimbank Stallions (5)	5–0	Heatherton United (6)
VIC	–	147	Westgate (5)	5–0	North Caulfield (6)
VIC	–	148	Mooroolbark (6)	0–0†	Malvern City (5)
Mooroolbark advance 6–5 on penalties
VIC	–	149	Eltham Redbacks (5)	0–1	FC Strathmore (5)
VIC	–	150	Lalor United (6)	3–1	Monash City Villarreal (8)
VIC	–	151	Sale United (10)	0–7	Clifton Hill (6)
VIC	–	152	White Star Dandenong (8)	3–4†	Watsonia Heights (8)
VIC	–	153	Mornington (5)	3–1	Melton Phoenix (9)
VIC	–	154	Lara United (9)	0–2	Gippsland United (5)
VIC	–	155	Altona City (5)	2–0	FC Melbourne Srbija (5)
VIC	–	156	Banyule City (5)	1–2	Richmond (5)
VIC	–	157	Chisholm United (7)	8–5	Tatura (10)
VIC	–	158	La Trobe University (8)	3–1	Uni Hill Eagles (7)
VIC	–	159	Monash University (7)	1–2	Ashburton United (7)
VIC	–	160	Barnstoneworth United (9)	0–3	South Springvale (5)
VIC	–	161	Sunbury United (7)	1–2	Springvale White Eagles (5)
VIC	–	162	Mill Park (6)	0–2	Casey Comets (5)
VIC	–	163	Bentleigh United Cobras (5)	2–1	Heidelberg Eagles (7)
VIC	–	164	Keilor Park (5)	4–1	Dandenong South (7)
VIC	–	165	Whittlesea Ranges (5)	9–0	Endeavour United (8)
VIC	–	166	Sydenham Park (5)	0–1	Templestowe Wolves (9)
VIC	–	167	Hoppers Crossing (6)	0–5	Upfield (5)
VIC	–	168	Manningham Juventus (8)	3–2	Berwick City (6)
VIC	–	169	Skye United (6)	3–1	Collingwood City (5)
VIC	–	170	Peninsula Strikers (6)	0–2	Williamstown (7)
VIC	–	171	Westvale Olympic (6)	4–0	Melbourne City (8)
VIC	–	172	Geelong Rangers (6)	5–1	Shepparton South (10)
VIC	–	173	Hume United (6)	2–4	Doncaster Rovers (6)
VIC	–	174	Frankston Pines (6)	6–1	Moonee Ponds United (8)
VIC	–	175	Knox City (6)	0–2	Yarraville (5)
VIC	–	176	Truganina (8)	0–3	Keilor Wolves (8)
VIC	–	177	Glenroy Lions (9)	3–0	Epsom (10)
Western Australia
WA	–	178	Ashfield SC (4)	3–2	Football Margaret River (-)
WA	–	179	Dianella White Eagles (3)	1–1†	Gwelup Croatia (3)
Gwelup Croatia advance 2–4 on penalties
WA	–	180	Gosnells City (3)	4–1	Ballajura AFC (7)
WA	–	181	Hamersley United (6)	1–4	South Perth United (5)
WA	–	182	Perth AFC (7)	9–0	Eaton Dardanup (-)
WA	–	183	Woodvale FC (8)	0–5	North Beach (5)
WA	–	184	Cracovia SC (7)	0–10	Murdoch University Melville (3)
WA	–	185	Perth Royals (8)	1–3	Jaguar FC (5)
WA	–	186	Busselton City (-)	1–0	Port Kennedy (6)
WA	–	187	Balga SC (4)	3–1	Wembley Downs (5)
WA	–	188	Kingsley Westside (4)	2–0	Morley-Windmills (4)
WA	–	189	Swan United (4)	2–1	Forrestfield United (3)
WA	–	190	Maddington-Kalamunda (4)	2–1	North Perth United (5)
WA	–	191	Joondalup United (3)	0–2	Mandurah City (3)
WA	–	192	Rockingham City (3)	6–1	Noranda City (8)
WA	–	193	Quinns FC (4)	4–1	Subiaco AFC (3)
WA	–	194	Carramar Shamrock Rovers (4)	3–1	Kwinana United (5)
WA	–	195	UWA-Nedlands (3)	3–5	Fremantle City (3)
WA	–	196	Curtin University (4)	7–1	Peel United (5)
WA	–	197	Wanneroo City (4)	1–1†	Joondalup City (4)
Joondalup City advance 3–4 on penalties
WA	–	198	Canning City (4)	0–6	Western Knights (3)

Notes

- w/o = Walkover
- † = After Extra Time
- ACT Byes: Canberra Juventus (3), Wagga City Wanderers (3)
- SA Byes: Adelaide Croatia Raiders (3), Elizabeth Downs (–), Elizabeth Grove (–), Noarlunga United (4), Pontian Eagles (4), Salisbury United (4), Tea Tree Gully City (–).

== Fourth round ==
Fed.	Zone	Tie no	Home team (Tier)	Score	Away team (Tier)
Australian Capital Territory
ACT	–	1	Wagga City Wanderers (3)	1–3	Monaro Panthers (2)
ACT	–	2	Canberra Croatia (2)	3–1	Tigers FC (2)
ACT	–	3	Brindabella Blues (3)	1–2	Belconnen United (3)
ACT	–	4	Yoogali SC (3)	0–4	ANU (3)
ACT	–	5	Tuggeranong United (2)	1–2	Canberra Olympic (2)
ACT	–	6	West Canberra Wanderers (2)	7–0	Canberra Juventus (3)
ACT	–	7	O'Connor Knights (2)	1–2†	Gungahlin United (2)
ACT	–	8	Weston Molonglo (4)	0–3	Belnorth (4)
New South Wales
NSW	–	9	Central Coast United (3)	4–1	Brighton Heat (-)
NSW	–	10	Mt Druitt Town Rangers (2)	4–0	Avoca FC (-)
NSW	–	11	Waverley Old Boys (5)	2–3	South Coast Flame (4)
NSW	–	12	Gerringong Breakers (-)	1–2	Lindfield FC (-)
NSW	–	13	Sydney United 58 (2)	2–0	Inner West Hawks (4)
NSW	–	14	Roselea FC (6)	0–9	Phoenix FC (-)
NSW	–	15	Bulli FC (5)	5–1	Macquarie Dragons (5)
NSW	–	16	Berkeley Vale (5)	1–4	Rydalmere Lions (3)
NSW	–	17	Sydney Olympic (2)	3–1	Blacktown City (2)
NSW	–	18	Sutherland Sharks (2)	9–1	Prospect United (4)
NSW	–	19	St George City (2) (3)	2–4	Randwick City (-)
NSW	–	20	Doonside Hawks (-)	0–4	Bonnyrigg White Eagles (2)
NSW	–	21	Northbridge FC (5)	2–0	Wyoming FC (5)
NSW	–	22	Cringila Lions (5)	4–1	Narrabeen FC (-)
NSW	–	23	Wollongong Olympic (5)	2–0	Bankstown United (4)
NSW	–	24	Rockdale Ilinden (2)	4–0	Albion Park White Eagles (5)
NSW	–	25	Hakoah Sydney City East (2)	7–0	Parramatta FC (4)
NSW	–	26	Manly United (2)	4–2†	Wollongong Wolves (2)
Manly United advance on penalties
NSW	–	27	Macarthur Rams (3)	1–5	Dunbar Rovers (3)
NSW	–	28	Unanderra Hearts (6)	1–7	Mounties Wanderers (3)
NSW	–	29	Blacktown Spartans (3)	4–3	St George FC (3)
NSW	–	30	Hurstville ZFC (4)	0–1†	Sydney University (4)
NSW	–	31	Helensburgh Thistle (-)	8–2	Como Jannali (-)
NSW	–	32	Marconi Stallions (2)	11–0	Quakers Hill Junior (-)
NSW	–	33	APIA Leichhardt (2)	6–0	Rouse Hill Rams (-)
NSW	–	34	Inter Lions (3)	6–0	Norwest FC (-)
NSW	–	35	Dulwich Hill (3)	0–3	NWS Spirit (2)
NSW	–	36	Kellyville Kolts (-)	3–4†	Terrigal United (-)
Terrigal United advance on penalties
NSW	–	37	Canterbury Bankstown (3)	1–2	Granville Rage (4)
NSW	–	38	Shellharbour FC	7–1	Forest Rangers (-)
NSW	–	39	SD Raiders (3)	0–1	Hawkesbury City (4)
NSW	–	40	Fraser Park (4)	0–2	Northern Tigers (3)
Northern New South Wales
NNSW	NTH	41	Woolgoolga United (-)	3–1	Northern Storm (-)
NNSW	NTH	42	Lismore Richmond Rovers (4)	1–3	Bangalow (-)
NNSW	NTH	43	Alstonville (-)	8–1	East Armidale (-)
NNSW	NTH	44	Coffs Coast Tigers (4)	5–0	Oxley Vale Attunga (-)
NNSW	STH	45	Broadmeadow Magic (2)	11–0	Wallsend (3)
NNSW	STH	46	West Wallsend (3)	0–4	Lambton Jaffas (2)
NNSW	STH	47	Kotara South (4)	4–1	Dudley Redhead United Senior (4)
NNSW	STH	48	Lake Macquarie City (2)	0–1	Weston Bears (2)
NNSW	STH	49	Adamstown Rosebud (2)	3–2	Kahibah (3)
NNSW	STH	50	Newcastle Olympic (2)	2–1†	Cooks Hill United (2)
NNSW	STH	51	Belmont Swansea United (3)	1–0	Toronto Awaba Stags (3)
NNSW	STH	52	South Cardiff (3)	0–3	Singleton Strikers (3)
NNSW	STH	53	New Lambton FC (2)	1–2	Edgeworth FC (2)
NNSW	STH	54	Valentine Phoenix (2)	6–1	Lambton Jaffas Junior (6)
NNSW	STH	55	Charlestown Azzurri (2)	2–0	Newcastle Suns (4)
NNSW	STH	56	Cessnock City Hornets (3)	0–6	Maitland FC (2)
Queensland
QLD	NTH	57	MA Olympic (5)	3–2	Burdekin (5)
QLD	WB v CC	58	Across the Waves (5)	2–2	Frenchville (5)
Across the Waves advance 8–7 on penalties
QLD	MI v FNG	59	Parkside United (-)	0–10	Edge Hill United (5)
QLD	WC	60	Mackay Lions (5)	3–0	Whitsunday United (5)
QLD	SEQ	61	Mooroondu (8)	1–8	Yeronga Eagles (7)
QLD	SEQ	62	Coomera Colts (5)	1–2	Southport (5)
QLD	SEQ	63	Redlands United (2)	3–0	Mulgrave Mustangs (5)
QLD	SEQ	64	Nambour Yandina United (5)	2–11	Brisbane City (2)
QLD	SEQ	65	Samford Rangers (4)	4–1	Ipswich City Bulls (6)
QLD	SEQ	66	New Farm United (6)	1–8	Lions FC (2)
QLD	SEQ	67	Logan Village (8)	6–2	Ripley Valley (6)
QLD	SEQ	68	North Pine (5)	1–2	North Star (4)
QLD	SEQ	69	Western Pride (3)	2–5	Caboolture Sports (3)
QLD	SEQ	70	SWQ Thunder (3)	1–2	Peninsula Power (2)
QLD	SEQ	71	Willowburn (5)	1–0	Holland Park Hawks (4)
QLD	SEQ	72	Logan Metro (6)	5–4†	St Albans (5)
QLD	SEQ	73	Logan Lightning (3)	1–3†	Albany Creek Excelsior (3)
QLD	SEQ	74	Surfers Paradise Apollo (3)	0–2	Capalaba (3)
QLD	SEQ	75	Narangba Eagles (7)	0–2	Gold Coast United (2)
QLD	SEQ	76	Maroochydore (5)	2–4	Brisbane Strikers (3)
QLD	SEQ	77	South United (4)	3–2	North Brisbane (6)
QLD	SEQ	78	Moreton Bay United (2)	2–0	Sunshine Coast Wanderers (2)
QLD	SEQ	79	Magic United	2–0	Sunshine Coast FC
QLD	SEQ	80	The Gap (6)	0–3	St George Willawong (5)
QLD	SEQ	81	Runaway Bay (5)	2–3	Rochedale Rovers (2)
QLD	SEQ	82	AC Carina (6)	4–1	UQFC (5)
QLD	SEQ	83	Brisbane Knights (6)	1–5	Olympic FC (2)
QLD	SEQ	84	Ipswich Knight (4)	1–6	Mitchelton (3)
QLD	SEQ	85	Eastern Suburbs (2)	3–2†	Wynnum Wolves (3)
QLD	SEQ	86	Southside Eagles (3)	0–3	Gold Coast Knights (2)

Fed.	Zone	Tie no	Home team (Tier)	Score	Away team (Tier)
QLD	SEQ	87	Caloundra (5)	1–1	Burleigh Heads (5)
QLD	SEQ	88	Broadbeach United (4)	3–1	Taringa Rovers (4)
Caloundra advance 5–4 on penalties
South Australia
SA	–	89	Modbury Vista (4)	2–6	Ghan Kilburn City (-)
SA	–	90	Seaford Rangers (4)	1–2†	Noarlunga United (4)
SA	–	91	Eastern United (3)	2–1	Elizabeth Grove (7)
SA	–	92	Adelaide Croatia Raiders (3)	0–3	Adelaide Comets (2)
SA	–	93	Elizabeth Downs (5)	4–5†	Adelaide Cobras (4)
SA	–	94	Playford City Patriots (3)	3–1	South Adelaide (2)
SA	–	95	West Adelaide (2)	4–5	West Torrens Birkalla (3)
SA	–	96	Cumberland United (2)	0–4	North Eastern MetroStars (2)
SA	–	97	Campbelltown City (2)	6–0	Adelaide Uni Grads Blue (5)
SA	–	98	Croydon FC (2)	7–1	Tea Tree Gully City (-)
SA	–	99	Sturt Lions (2)	6–1	Salisbury United (4)
SA	–	100	Western Strikers (4)	0–7	FK Beograd (2)
SA	–	101	Adelaide City (2)	7–0	Pontian Eagles (4)
SA	–	102	Adelaide Blue Eagles (3)	1–3	Modbury Jets (3)
SA	–	103	Northern Demons (4)	2–3	Adelaide Olympic (2)
SA	–	104	Vipers FC (3)	0–1	Adelaide Uni SC (4)
Tasmania
TAS	–	105	Kingborough Lions United (2)	w/o	Northern Rangers (3)
TAS	–	106	Glenorchy Knights (2)	7–0	Hobart City Beachside (3)
TAS	–	107	Ulverstone (3)	2–5	Hobart United (3)
TAS	–	108	Riverside Olympic (2)	6–1	Barnstoneworth United (5)
TAS	–	109	Devonport City Strikers (2)	7–0	Olympia FC Warriors (2)
TAS	–	110	Clarence Zebras FC (2)	6–0	Taroona (3)
TAS	–	111	South Hobart (2)	9–1	New Town Eagles (3)
TAS	–	112	Launceston United (2)	1–4	Launceston City (2)
Victoria
VIC	–	113	Avondale (2)	17–0	Diamond Valley United (7)
VIC	–	114	Caroline Springs George Cross (3)	1–2	Altona Magic (2)
VIC	–	115	Port Melbourne (2)	7–1	Richmond (5)
VIC	–	116	Northcote City (3)	3–1	Bayside Argonauts (7)
VIC	–	117	Moreland City (2)	3–1	Croydon City (8)
VIC	–	118	Westgate FC (5)	4–1	Geelong Rangers (6)
VIC	–	119	Mooroolbark (6)	3–0	Ringwood City (8)
VIC	–	120	Ashburton United (7)	2 –4	Keilor Wolves (8)
VIC	–	121	Bentleigh United Cobras (5)	4–0	Manningham Juventus (8)
VIC	–	122	Clifton Hill (6)	4–0	Mornington (5)
VIC	–	123	Brunswick City (3)	4–4†	Chisholm United (7)
Chisholm United advance 2–4 on penalties
VIC	–	124	Langwarrin (3)	0–2	Brandon Park (6)
VIC	–	125	Nunawading City (4)	3–2	Beaumaris (4)
VIC	–	126	Greenvale United (8)	0–7	Hampton East Brighton (6)
VIC	–	127	Watsonia Heights (8)	1–4	Casey Comets (5)
VIC	–	128	FC Strathmore (5)	0–1	Bentleigh Greens (3)
VIC	–	129	Gippsland United (5)	0–3	Brimbank Stallions (5)
VIC	–	130	Melbourne Knights (2)	6–1	Corio (5)
VIC	–	131	La Trobe University (8)	1–4	Lalor United (6)
VIC	–	132	Yarraville (5)	5–3	Epping City (6)
VIC	–	133	Westvale Olympic (6)	2–1	Old Scotch (5)
VIC	–	134	Frankston Pines (6)	0–3	St Albans Saints (2)
VIC	–	135	Heidelberg United (2)	5–1	Springvale White Eagles (5)
VIC	–	136	South Springvale (5)	2–1†	Essendon Royals (4)
VIC	–	137	Templestowe Wolves (9)	0–2	Ballarat City (4)
VIC	–	138	Whittlesea United (5)	2–1	Bulleen Lions (3)
VIC	–	139	Doncaster Rovers (6)	1–7	Hume City (2)
VIC	–	140	Werribee City (3)	0–1†	Dandenong Thunder (2)
VIC	–	141	South Melbourne (2)	3–4	Kingston City (3)
VIC	–	142	Goulburn Valley Suns (4)	6–0	Pascoe Vale (4)
VIC	–	143	Whittlesea Ranges (5)	3–2	Manningham United Blues (2)
VIC	–	144	Green Gully (2)	1–2	Eastern Lions (3)
VIC	–	145	Geelong SC (4)	5–0	Brunswick Juventus (4)
VIC	–	146	Skye United (6)	2–1	Glenroy Lions (9)
VIC	–	147	North Geelong Warriors (3)	2–0	Altona City (4)
VIC	–	148	Keilor Park (5)	0–2	Box Hill United (4)
VIC	–	149	North Sunshine Eagles (4)	2–0	Williamstown (7)
VIC	–	150	Boroondara-Carey Eagles (4)	0–1	Upfield (5)
VIC	–	151	Dandenong City (2)	5–1	Doveton (4)
VIC	–	152	Preston Lions (3)	1–3	Oakleigh Cannons (2)
Western Australia
WA	–	153	Gosnells City (4)	3–2	Busselton City (-)
WA	–	154	Sorrento FC (2)	3–1	Ashfield SC (4)
WA	–	155	Maddington-Kalamunda (4)	4–0	Quinns FC (3)
WA	–	156	Kingsley-Westside (4)	3–4	Perth RedStar (2)
WA	–	157	Perth AFC (7)	0–5	Inglewood United (2)
WA	–	158	Floreat Athena (2)	3–1	Jaguar FC (5)
WA	–	159	Fremantle City (3)	5–4	Perth SC (2)
WA	–	160	Swan United (4)	0–0	Carramar Shamrock Rovers (4)
WA	–	161	Western Knights (3)	1–2	Mandurah City (3)
WA	–	162	Murdoch University Melville (3)	6–0	South Perth United (5)
WA	–	163	Gwelup Croatia (3)	2–0	Armadale SC (2)
WA	–	164	Stirling Macedonia (2)	8–0	North Beach (5)
WA	–	165	Olympic Kingsway (2)	3–2	Bayswater City (2)
WA	–	166	Balcatta FC (2)	4–2	Joondalup City (4)
WA	–	167	Curtin University (4)	3–1	Balga SC (4)
WA	–	168	Rockingham City (3)	0–2	Cockburn City (2)

Notes

- w/o = Walkover
- † = After Extra Time

== Fifth round ==
Fed.	Zone	Tie no	Home team (Tier)	Score	Away team (Tier)
Australian Capital Territory
ACT	–	1	Canberra Olympic (2)	3–0	West Canberra Wanderers (2)
ACT	–	2	ANU (2)	1–3	Gungahlin United (2)
ACT	–	3	Belnorth FC (-)	2–5	Belconnen United (3)
ACT	–	4	Monaro Panthers (2)	1–2	Canberra Croatia (2)
New South Wales
NSW	–	5	Mt Druitt Town Rangers (2)	4–3†	Manly United FC (2)
NSW	–	6	Northern Tigers (3)	2–1	Sydney Uni (4)
NSW	–	7	Dunbar Rovers (3)	0–1	Northbridge FC (5)
NSW	–	8	APIA Leichhardt (2)	7–0	Lindfield FC (-)
NSW	–	9	Wollongong Olympic (-)	2–1	Helensburgh Thistle (-)
NSW	–	10	Central Coast United (3)	2–4	Blacktown Spartans (3)
NSW	–	11	Randwick City (-)	0–3	South Coast Flame (4)
NSW	–	12	Hawkesbury City (4)	3–4	Mounties Wanderers (3)
NSW	–	13	NWS Spirit (2)	2–0†	Terrigal United (-)
NSW	–	14	FC Shellharbour (-)	0–3	Sutherland Sharks (2)
NSW	–	15	Phoenix FC (-)	0–1	Bulli FC (-)
NSW	–	16	Bonnyrigg White Eagles (3)	0–2	Inter Lions (3)
NSW	–	17	Rockdale Ilinden (2)	4–0	Rydalmere Lions (3)
NSW	–	18	Marconi Stallions (2)	1–2	Sydney Olympic (2)
NSW	–	19	Cringila Lions (-)	2–1	Western Rage (4)
NSW	–	20	Sydney United 58 (2)	2–0	Maccabi Hakoah (3)
Northern New South Wales
NNSW	NTH	21	Alstonville (-)	2–1	Woolgoolga United (-)
NNSW	NTH	22	Bangalow (-)	4–0	Coffs Coast Tigers (4)
NNSW	STH	23	Kotara South (4)	0–6	Lambton Jaffas (2)
NNSW	STH	24	Broadmeadow Magic (2)	5–1	Weston Bears (2)
NNSW	STH	25	Edgeworth (2)	2–0	Charlestown Azzurri (2)
NNSW	STH	26	Maitland (2)	6–0	Adamstown Rosebud (2)
NNSW	STH	27	Belmont Swansea United (3)	2–1	Singleton Strikers (3)
NNSW	STH	28	Newcastle Olympic (2)	2–1	Valentine Phoenix (2)
Northern Territory
NT	ASP	29	Verdi FC (-)	5–0	Alice Springs Celtic (-)
NT	DAR	30	Casuarina (2)	1–3	University Azzurri (2)
NT	DAR	31	Mindil Aces (2)	6–1	Darwin Hearts (2)
Queensland
QLD	FNG v NTH	32	Edge Hill United (5)	3–2†	MA Olympic (5)
QLD	WB v WC	33	Across the Waves (5)	2–1	Mackay Lions (-)
QLD	SEQ	34	Brisbane City (2)	9–0	Eastern Suburbs (2)
QLD	SEQ	35	AC Carina (6)	2–6	Redlands United (2)
QLD	SEQ	36	Willowburn (7)	0–4	Gold Coast United (2)
QLD	SEQ	37	Gold Coast Knights (2)	10–0	Albany Creek Excelsior (3)
QLD	SEQ	38	Capalaba FC (3)	1–2	Peninsula Power (2)
QLD	SEQ	39	Souths United FC (4)	0–2	Brisbane Strikers (3)
QLD	SEQ	40	Southport (5)	1–2	North Star (4)
QLD	SEQ	41	Logan Metro (6)	2–3	Caloundra FC (5)
QLD	SEQ	42	Caboolture Sports (3)	1–0	Rochedale Rovers (2)
QLD	SEQ	43	Mitchelton (3)	0–2	Broadbeach United
QLD	SEQ	44	Moreton Bay United (2)	5–0	Olympic FC

Fed.	Zone	Tie no	Home team (Tier)	Score	Away team (Tier)
QLD	SEQ	45	Logan Village (8)	1–6	Lions FC (2)
QLD	SEQ	46	Yeronga Eagles (8)	3–1	Samford Rangers 4)
QLD	SEQ	47	Magic United (4)	3–1	St. George Willawaong (4)
South Australia
SA	–	48	Ghan Kilburn City (-)	2–3	Adelaide Uni SC (4)
SA	–	49	FK Beograd (2)	1–3	Adelaide Cobras (4)
SA	–	50	Eastern United (3)	1–0†	Modbury Jets (3)
SA	–	51	Campbelltown City (2)	3–2	Playford City Patriots (3)
SA	–	52	Adelaide City (2)	6–0	Adelaide Olympic (2)
SA	–	53	Adelaide Comets (2)	1–4	North Eastern MetroStars (2)
SA	–	54	Croydon FC (2)	3–1	Sturt Lions (2)
SA	–	55	West Torrens Birkalla (3)	1–1	Noarlunga United (4)
West Torrens Birkalla advance 5–4 on penalties
Tasmania
TAS	–	56	Riverside Olympic (2)	0–1	Hobart United (3)
TAS	–	57	Launceston City (2)	1–2	Clarence Zebras (2)
TAS	–	58	Kingborough Lions United (2)	1–2	Devonport City Strikers (2)
TAS	–	59	South Hobart (2)	7–2	Glenorchy Knights (2)
Victoria
VIC	–	60	Eastern Lions (3)	2–1	Bentleigh United Cobras (5)
VIC	–	61	Brandon Park SC (6)	2–4	North Sunshine Eagles (4)
VIC	–	62	Westgate Sindjelic (5)	0–3	Bentleigh Greens (2)
VIC	–	63	Avondale (2)	1–0	Casey Comets (5)
VIC	–	64	Whittlesea Ranges (5)	1–0	Ballarat City (4)
VIC	–	65	Port Melbourne (2)	0–1	Clifton Hill (6)
VIC	–	66	Nunawading City (4)	2–3	South Springvale (5)
VIC	–	67	Lalor United (6)	2–3	Goulburn Valley Suns (4)
VIC	–	68	Kingston City (3)	1–3	Heidelberg United (2)
VIC	–	69	Upfield (5)	2–4	Dandenong City (3)
VIC	–	70	Whittlesea United (5)	0–2	St Albans Saints Dinamo (2)
VIC	–	71	Westvale Olympic (6)	0–3	Northcote City (3)
VIC	–	72	Moreland City (2)	3–1	Mooroolbark SC (6)
VIC	–	73	Brimbank Stallions (5)	2–0	Altona Magic (2)
VIC	–	74	Hume City (2)	8–0	Keilor Wolves (8)
VIC	–	75	Oakleigh Cannons (2)	4–0	Dandenong Thunder (2)
VIC	–	76	Skye United (6)	2–4	Yarraville Glory (5)
VIC	–	77	Melbourne Knights (2)	5–0	Box Hill United (4)
VIC	–	78	North Geelong Warriors (2)	3–2	Chisholm United (7)
VIC	–	79	Geelong (4)	2–1	Hampton East Brighton (6)
Western Australia
WA	–	80	Cockburn City (2)	1–0	Perth RedStar (2)
WA	–	81	Curtin University (4)	0–1	Floreat Athena (2)
WA	–	82	Fremantle City (3)	2–1	Olympic Kingsway (2)
WA	–	83	Inglewood United (2)	3–0	Gosnells City (4)
WA	–	84	Maddington-Kalamunda (4)	2–3†	Gwelup Croatia (3)
WA	–	85	Mandurah City (3)	0–3	Sorrento FC (2)
WA	–	86	Murdoch University Melville (3)	1–3	Balcatta FC (2)
WA	–	87	Stirling Macedonia (2)	5–1	Swan United (4)
Stirling Macedonia removed from competition for an administrative breach.

Notes

- † = After Extra Time
- NT Byes: Hellenic Athletic (2).

== Sixth round ==
Fed.	Zone	Tie no	Home team (Tier)	Score	Away team (Tier)
Australian Capital Territory
ACT	–	1	Canberra Croatia (2)	5–3†	Gungahlin United (2)
ACT	–	2	Belconnen United (3)	0–2	Canberra Olympic (2)
New South Wales
NSW	–	3	Mt Druitt Town Rangers (2)	5–1	Bulli FC (5)
NSW	–	4	APIA Leichhardt (2)	5–0	Blacktown Spartans (3)
NSW	–	5	Sutherland Sharks (2)	0–2	NWS Spirit (2)
NSW	–	6	Mounties Wanderers (3)	0–3	Northbridge FC (5)
NSW	–	7	Sydney Olympic (2)	3–0	South Coast Flame (4)
NSW	–	8	Wollongong Olympic (5)	0–2	Inter Lions (3)
NSW	–	9	Northern Tigers (4)	0–1†	Sydney United 58 (2)
NSW	–	10	Cringila Lions (5)	1–3	Rockdale Ilinden (2)
Northern New South Wales
NNSW	–	11	Alstonville FC (-)	0–2	Newcastle Olympic (2)
NNSW	–	12	Broadmeadow Magic (2)	5–1	Bangalow (-)
NNSW	–	13	Maitland FC (2)	6–0	Belmont Swansea United (3)
NNSW	–	14	Edgeworth FC (2)	3–1†	Lambton Jaffas (2)
Northern Territory
NT	DAR	15	Hellenic Athletic (2)	3–0	University Azzurri (2)
NT	ASP v DAR	16	Verdi FC (2)	2–0	Mindil Aces (2)
Queensland
QLD	REG	17	Edge Hill United (5)	7–1	Across the Waves (5)
QLD	SEQ	18	Peninsula Power (2)	2–0	Caboolture Sports (3)
QLD	SEQ	19	Magic United (4)	4–5†	Redlands United (2)
QLD	SEQ	20	Gold Coast United (2)	2–0	Broadbeach United (4)
QLD	SEQ	21	Yeronga Eagles (7)	1–0	Caloundra FC (5)
QLD	SEQ	22	Lions FC (2)	8–0	North Star (4)

Fed.	Zone	Tie no	Home team (Tier)	Score	Away team (Tier)
QLD	SEQ	23	Moreton Bay United (2)	7–1	Brisbane Strikers (3)
QLD	SEQ	24	Gold Coast Knights (2)	4–2	Brisbane City (2)
South Australia
SA	–	25	West Torrens Birkalla (3)	2–0	Eastern United (3)
SA	–	26	North Eastern MetroStars (2)	4–2	Adelaide Cobras (4)
SA	–	27	Campbelltown City (2)	1–0	Adelaide City (2)
SA	–	28	University of Adelaide (4)	0–3	Croydon FC (2)
Tasmania
TAS	–	29	Devonport City Strikers (2)	3–2	Clarence Zebras (2)
TAS	–	30	Hobart United (3)	0–5	South Hobart (2)
Victoria
VIC	–	31	Heidelberg United (2)	1–0	Avondale FC (2)
VIC	–	32	Oakleigh Cannons (2)	2–0	Dandenong City (3)
VIC	–	33	Northcote City (3)	2–1	Moreland City (2)
VIC	–	34	Bentleigh Greens (2)	0–2	Melbourne Knights (2)
VIC	–	35	Goulburn Valley Suns (4)	3–1	Whittlesea Ranges (5)
VIC	–	36	Brimbank Stallions (5)	1–3	Geelong SC (4)
VIC	–	37	South Springvale (5)	1–3	Clifton Hill (6)
VIC	–	38	North Geelong Warriors (2)	0–1	St Albans Saints Dinamo (2)
VIC	–	39	Eastern Lions (3)	0–3	Hume City (2)
VIC	–	40	Yarraville Glory (5)	1–1†	North Sunshine Eagles (4)
Yarraville Glory advance 5–4 on penalties
Western Australia
WA	–	41	Fremantle City (3)	2–3	Inglewood United (2)
WA	–	42	Sorrento FC (2)	6–0	Swan United (4)
WA	–	43	Cockburn City (2)	1–0	Gwelup Croatia (3)
WA	–	44	Balcatta Etna (2)	0–1	Floreat Athena (2)

Notes

- † = After Extra Time

== Seventh round ==
Fed.	Zone	Tie no	Home team (Tier)	Score	Away team (Tier)
Australian Capital Territory
ACT	–	1	Canberra Croatia (2)	4–2	Canberra Olympic (2)
New South Wales
NSW	–	2	Mt Druitt Town Rangers (2)	3–0	Northbridge FC (5)
NSW	–	3	Sydney United 58 (2)	2–0	NWS Spirit (2)
NSW	–	4	APIA Leichhardt (2)	1–1†	Sydney Olympic (2)
APIA Leichhardt advance 4–1 on penalties
NSW	–	5	Inter Lions (3)	2–1	Rockdale Ilinden (2)
Northern New South Wales
NNSW	–	6	Broadmeadow Magic (2)	3–0	Maitland FC (2)
NNSW	–	7	Newcastle Olympic (2)	1–2†	Edgeworth FC (2)
Northern Territory
NT	–	8	Hellenic Athletic (2)	3–1	Verdi FC (2)
Queensland
QLD	REG v SEQ	9	Edge Hill United (5)	0–2	Gold Coast Knights (2)
QLD	SEQ	10	Yeronga Eagles (7)	0–2	Peninsula Power (2)
QLD	SEQ	11	Redlands United (2)	1–2	Lions FC (2)

Fed.	Zone	Tie no	Home team (Tier)	Score	Away team (Tier)
QLD	SEQ	12	Moreton Bay United (2)	2–1	Gold Coast United (2)
South Australia
SA	–	13	West Torrens Birkalla (3)	0–5	North Eastern MetroStars (2)
SA	–	14	Campbelltown City (2)	1–0	Croydon FC (2)
Tasmania
TAS	–	15	South Hobart (2)	0–1	Devonport City Strikers (2)
Victoria
VIC	–	16	Melbourne Knights (2)	3–1	Yarraville Glory (5)
VIC	–	17	Northcote City (3)	1–1†	Clifton Hill (6)
Northcote City advance 5–4 on penalties
VIC	–	18	Oakleigh Cannons (2)	5–0	Geelong SC (4)
VIC	–	19	Goulburn Valley Suns (4)	2–0	Hume City (2)
VIC	–	20	Heidelberg United (2)	3–2†	St Albans Saints Dinamo (2)
Western Australia
WA	–	21	Inglewood United (2)	3–0	Sorrento FC (2)
WA	–	22	Cockburn City (2)	1–2	Floreat Athena (2)

Notes

- † = After Extra Time

== A-League Men play-offs ==
17 July 2023
19:00 ACST

Newcastle Jets	2–2 (a.e.t.)	Melbourne Victory
Buhagiar 18'; Goodwin 70'	Report	Velupillay 90+2'; Wilson 90+7'
Penalties
Goodwin (penalty scored); Stynes (penalty missed); Timmins (penalty scored); Jenkinson (penalty scored); Cancar (penalty scored)	4–2	Folami (penalty scored); Wilson (penalty missed); Velupillay (penalty scored); Valadon (penalty missed)

Larrakia Park, Darwin
Attendance: 2,105
Referee: Jack Morgan

18 July 2023
19:00 ACST

Perth Glory	0–4	Macarthur FC
	Report	Sail 2' (o.g.); Rose 18'; Hollman 34'; Drew 80'

Larrakia Park, Darwin
Attendance: 1,446
Referee: Daniel Elder

== See also ==
- 2023 FSA Federation Cup
