= Devonport FC =

Devonport FC may refer to:

- Devonport City FC, an Australian soccer team
- Devonport Football Club, an Australian rules football team
