= National Premier Leagues Tasmania =

- Founded: 2012; 14 years ago
- Country: Australia
- Confederation: AFC
- Number of clubs: 8
- Level on pyramid: 2
- Domestic cup(s): Milan Lakoseljac Cup; Australia Cup
- Current premiers: South Hobart (2026)
- Most premierships: Devonport City (6 titles)
- Website: NPL Tasmania
- Current: 2026 NPL Tasmania

The National Premier Leagues Tasmania is an Australian semi-professional football league part of the National Premier Leagues, covering the state of Tasmania. The competition sits at tier two overall in the Australian football league system, below the A-League and alongside other states' National Premier Leagues.

== History ==
Prior to the NPL Tasmania the previous statewide league encompassing teams from all-over Tasmania had not taken place since 1999. The highest level of soccer being played in Tasmania was in two regional leagues in the North and South of the state.

The league was formed in 2012 by Football Federation Tasmania ((FFT) and the first season commenced in 2013. FFT referred to the league as the T-League during planning prior to the establishment of the league. Between 2012 and 2014 the league was known as the Victory League due to sponsorship by A-League club Melbourne Victory. In 2015 the league was officially known as the PS4 Victory League also for sponsorship reasons. In 2016, the league changed names again to National Premier Leagues Tasmania in line with other divisions within the NPL.

The initial clubs were awarded licences for league membership for three seasons between 2013 and 2015. In 2015 the FFT Board analysed the clubs on and off pitch. Based on this analysis six of the eight clubs in the NPL Tasmania were offered licences for an additional three seasons between 2016 and 2018. Glenorchy Knights and Launceston City were required to reapply for membership and compete with other clubs for the final two positions in the league in 2016. Riverside Olympic, University, Clarence and New Town Eagles also applied for the two positions in addition to Glenorchy and Launceston City. In August 2015 it was announced that Clarence United and Launceston City had been awarded the available licences between 2016 and 2018.

Up until 2017, the top teams in the league also qualified for a Tasmanian end of season finals series. Between 2013 and 2015 the winner of the local finals series was awarded the Victory Cup. In 2013 and 2014 the top four teams participated in the finals series. In 2015 the finals series has been expanded to include the top six teams in the league as well as the champions of the Northern Championship and Southern Championship. In 2016, the end of season finals series cup was renamed the League Cup due to lapsing sponsorship arrangements, and scrapped entirely after the end of the 2017 season.

In 2019, the league expanded to nine teams. However, following the season, two clubs amalgamated bringing the league back to eight teams.

In September 2025, Football Tasmania announced that the league would expand to ten clubs for the 2026 season with the addition of South East United and Ulverstone. Following the 2026 season, the bottom two clubs will be relegated and the competition will revert to eight clubs in 2027.

== Format ==
In late 2016, FFT announced they will expand the league to ten teams and introduce a promotion/relegation system. The winner of the 2018 Southern and Northern Championships were promoted into NPL Tasmania and to have the competition with ten teams for 2019, however Northern Rangers withdrew from the league leaving nine clubs. From the end of the 2019 season the winners of the Northern and Southern Championships will play-off against each other with the winner then automatically replacing the last placed finisher in the NPL Tasmania whilst the loser of the Northern and Southern Championships Play-off will play an additional play-off for a place in the NPL Tasmania in the following season against the second last NPL Tasmania club. After 2019, two clubs merged lowering the league back to eight clubs.

The goal of the league is to consist of ten clubs geographically spread throughout Tasmania (although currently there are eight). The team on top of the table is considered the league champion and qualifies to play in the National Premier Leagues finals series against the champions of the other states.

== Current clubs ==
The following 10 clubs are competing in the NPL Tasmania for the 2026 season.

Club	Location	Ground	Capacity	Years in league
Clarence Zebras	Howrah	Wentworth Park	1,000	2020–present
Devonport City	Devonport	TassieCare Valley Road	3,500	2013–present
Glenorchy Knights	Glenorchy	KGV Park	4,000	2013–2015; 2019–present
Kingborough Lions United	Kingston	Kitchen Centre Park	5,000	2013–present
Launceston City	Prospect	TassieCare Park	1,000	2013–present
Launceston United	Newstead	Birch Avenue	500	2023–present
Riverside Olympic	Riverside	Windsor Park	1,000	2019–present
South East United	Sorell	Pembroke Park	500	2026–present
South Hobart	South Hobart	Darcy Street	2,000	2013–present
Ulverstone	Ulverstone	Ulverstone Show Ground	500	2026–present

== Honours ==
Season	League		Final series		NPL finals series representation
Season	Premiers	Runner-up	Winner	Runner-up	NPL finals series representation
2013	South Hobart	Devonport City	South Hobart	Devonport City	South Hobart – Runners-up
2014	South Hobart	Hobart Zebras	South Hobart	Northern Rangers	South Hobart – Quarter-finalist
2015	Olympia Warriors	South Hobart	Olympia Warriors	Hobart Zebras	Olympia Warriors – Semi-finalist
2016	Devonport City	Hobart Zebras	South Hobart	Devonport City	Devonport City – Quarter-finalist
2017	South Hobart	Olympia Warriors	South Hobart	Olympia Warriors	South Hobart – Quarter-finalist
2018	Devonport City	South Hobart	Not held		Devonport City – Quarter-finalist
2019	Devonport City	Olympia Warriors	Not held		Devonport City – Quarter-finalist
2020	Devonport City	Glenorchy Knights	Cancelled due to the COVID-19 pandemic in Australia.		
2021	Glenorchy Knights	Devonport City	Cancelled due to the COVID-19 pandemic in Australia.		
2022	Devonport City	South Hobart	Not held		
2023	Devonport City	South Hobart	South Hobart	Devonport City	Not held
2024	Glenorchy Knights	South Hobart	Not held		
Season	Premiers	Runner-up	Winner	Runner-up	Australian Championship representation
2025	South Hobart	Launceston City	Not held		South Hobart – Group stage
2026	South Hobart	Devonport City	South Hobart	Devonport City	South Hobart – Group stage

== Records ==
- Most League titles: 6, Devonport City
- Most points in a season: 62, Devonport City, 2019 season
- Most wins in a season: 20, Devonport City, 2019 season
- Most goals scored in a season: 91, Devonport City, 2019 season
- Most consecutive wins in a season: 13, South Hobart, 2017 season
- Biggest win: Olympia Warriors 14 – 0 Glenorchy Knights, 21 June 2015
- Highest scoring game: Launceston City 12 – 3 Clarence Zebras, 2 August 2025

=== All time table ===
Figures are correct as of the end of the 2025 regular season.

Position	Team	Played	Won	Draw	Lost	Goals for	Goals against	Goals ±	Points	1st	2nd	3rd	4th
1	South Hobart	269	190	36	43	913	322	+591	606	4	5	4	
2	Devonport City	269	184	30	55	771	322	+449	582	6	2	2	1
3	Kingborough Lions United	269	106	35	128	540	638	−98	353			2	4
4	Olympia	206	101	22	83	502	371	+131	325	1	2	1	2
5	Glenorchy Knights	206	94	24	88	444	456	−12	306	2	1	1	1
6	Launceston City	269	90	31	148	443	665	−222	301		1		1
7	Hobart Zebras	150	87	30	33	438	211	+227	291		2	3	2
8	Northern Rangers	126	38	26	62	256	305	−49	140				2
9	Clarence Zebras	119	27	12	80	187	335	−148	93				
10	Riverside Olympic	143	23	14	106	157	460	−303	83				
11	Clarence United	87	8	9	70	70	401	−331	33				
12	Launceston United	63	4	3	56	60	295	−235	15				

Playing in the NPL Tasmania
Playing in Northern or Southern Championship Tasmania
Clubs merged at end of 2019 to form Clarence Zebras

=== Top scorers ===
Season	Player	Club	Goals
2013	Brayden Mann	Devonport City	26
2014	Brayden Mann	South Hobart	31
2015	Brayden Mann	South Hobart	29
2016	Brayden Mann	Devonport City	24
2017	Jakub Sklenar	Olympia	28
2018	Brayden Mann	Devonport City	38
2019	Mathew Sanders	Hobart Zebras	31
2020	Alex Walter	Glenorchy Knights	14
2021	Brody Denehey	Devonport City	22
2022	Roberto Fernandez Garrido	Devonport City	27
2023	Roberto Fernandez Garrido	Devonport City	28
2024	Kobe Kemp; Noah Mies	Kingborough Lions	20
2025	Thierry Swaby; Angus Taylor	Launceston City	25
