= Hélder Dos Santos Silva =

Portuguese football manager (born 1980)

Personal information
- Full name: Hélder Manuel Dos Santos Silva
- Date of birth: 18 June 1980 (age 46)
- Place of birth: Valongo, Portugal
- Height: 1.75 m (5 ft 9 in)

Team information
- Current team: Pascoe Vale (head coach)

Managerial career
- Years: Team
- 2010–2015: Eastbourne Borough F.C (perform analyst & assistant coach)
- 2015–2016: Whitehawk F.C. (assistant coach)
- 2016–2018: Crystal Palace F.C. (U-21's assistant coach, U-18 head coach & academy scout)
- 2018–2019: Guandong Southern Tigers (head coach)
- 2018-2019: Chinese Football Association (youth director Meizhou)
- 2018-2022: Meizhou Football Association (head coach)
- 2020-2022: Meizhou Hakka F.C (head coach and youth director)
- 2022-2022: Alar 359 Football Club (head coach)
- 2022-2026: Riverside Olympic FC (manager and technical director)
- 2026-: Pascoe Vale (head coach)

Hélder Manuel Dos Santos Silva (born 18 June 1980) is a Portuguese Football manager and former player, who played as a defensive midfielder. He had a diverse football career that spanned several clubs across different levels. He began with Alunos de Meirim and went on to play for teams like Sport Club Nun’Alvarez, Uniao Desportiva de Valonguense, Grupo Desportivo de Covelo, Grupo Desportivo de Aguas Santas, and Caide De Rei Sport Club. In 2004, he joined Hailsham Town Football Club, followed by a move to Eastbourne United Football Club in 2005 and then to Eastbourne Borough Football Club. after successful seasons, he joined Aldershot Town Football Club in January 2008 and retired the same year at the age of 28.

== Career ==
Silva began his coaching career in 2008 at the grassroots level after retiring and progressed through the ladder establishing his own football academy, Prodirect Soccer Academy, in 2011. He progressed with his coaching, from scout to head coach, managing teams like Eastbourne Borough F.C in 2010-2015 as a perform analyst and assistant coach. Hel then moved to Whitehawk F.C where he held the position of assistant Coach and scouting coordinator at National League South club Whitehawk F.C., during the 2015-2016 season.

From 2016 to 2018, Silva worked as academy scout and coach of the Crystal Palace Under-18s who were playing in the Premier League 2 division, and later as assistant coach of the under-23s, where he assisted the Under-23 head coach with daily training sessions.

In 2018, Silva was appointed by Meizhou Football Association as the head coach of the association and Meizhou Sports school. From 10 May 2019 to 12 May 2019, he taught 34 Chinese youth coaches how to improve the abilities of young players in training, during a three-day football coach training course organized by the Meizhou Football Association at the Meizhou Sports School.

On 8 September 2020, he helped the Meizhou youth team win the 2020 Guangdong Provincial Youth Football Championship for the first time in 15 years.

Silva left China in the summer of 2022 and was announced as the men's team head coach of Australia National Premier League side, Riverside Olympic Football Club, on 24 September 2022.

== Honours ==
- 5th place: Premier League 2 Div.1 - Crystal Palace U-16's+U-18's
- 4th place: Premier League 2 Div.1 - Crystal Palace U-18's+U-23's
  - Champions: Governor's Cup U-17's & U-18's 2022 - Meizhou FA
  - Champions: Chinese FA-2020 provincial championship - Meizhou FA
  - ' Champions: Chinese FA National Champions President Cup 2019 - Meizhou FA
  - Champions: Alar 359 Chinese Champions League Div. 3 - promotion to 2nd Division
- Chinese Football Association-16th Provincial Olympic Games 2022 - 2nd Place, Meizhou FA
- 2nd place: Chinese Football Association Youth League - Guandong Tigers U-14's
