= Pascoe Vale FC =

- Full name: Pascoe Vale Football Club
- Nicknames: Paco; Pelister; Rams
- Founded: 1966; 60 years ago, as Pascoe Vale Pelister Soccer Club
- Ground: Hosken Reserve
- Capacity: 2,000
- Chairman: Lou Tona
- Manager: Hélder Dos Santos Silva
- League: Victorian State League 1 North–West
- 2026: 6th of 12
- Website: http://www.pvfc.com.au/
Home colours	Away colours

Pascoe Vale Football Club (formerly Pascoe Vale Soccer Club) is a football club from Pascoe Vale, a north-western suburb of Melbourne, Victoria, Australia.

The club was established in 1966, and the Rams currently compete in the Victorian State League 1 North–West competition, which is the fifth tier in the Australian soccer league system.

== History ==
The first known Pascoe Vale Soccer Club was formed in 1932 by British migrants.

In 1966, immigrants from Macedonia of Aromanian descent reformed the club. The new immigrants renamed the club to Pascoe Vale Pelister, after the mountain where their home village of Nižepole is located.

=== Victorian State Leagues ===
The club made a surge through the Provisional Leagues in the early 1980s, achieving three successive promotions between 1982 and 1984, taking Pascoe Vale from Victorian Provisional League Division 4 to Provisional League 1. The club was again promoted in 1986, competing in the State Leagues for the first time in 1987. The club remained in Victorian State League Division 4 for the next six years until they were promoted to State League 3 in 1992, where the club spent the next nine years. In 2001, the club achieved promotion to State League Division 2 for the first time in its history.

Despite coming close in 2003, losing to Langwarrin on penalties, and in 2004, losing to Kingston City FC again on penalties in the promotion playoff match, the club didn’t achieve promotion to State League 1 until 2008, when it won the State League 2 championship under the guidance of Luciano Trani. In 2011, Vitale Ferrante took over as senior head coach, taking over from George Karkaletsis after seven rounds.

Pascoe Vale were promoted to the Victorian Premier League in 2012, finishing top of State League One, five points ahead of Port Melbourne. This was marked as the greatest achievement of the club, marking the next big step from a small family club to competing with some of the biggest clubs Australia has to offer. In 2013, Tomi Milardovic and Davey Van't Schip joined the club.

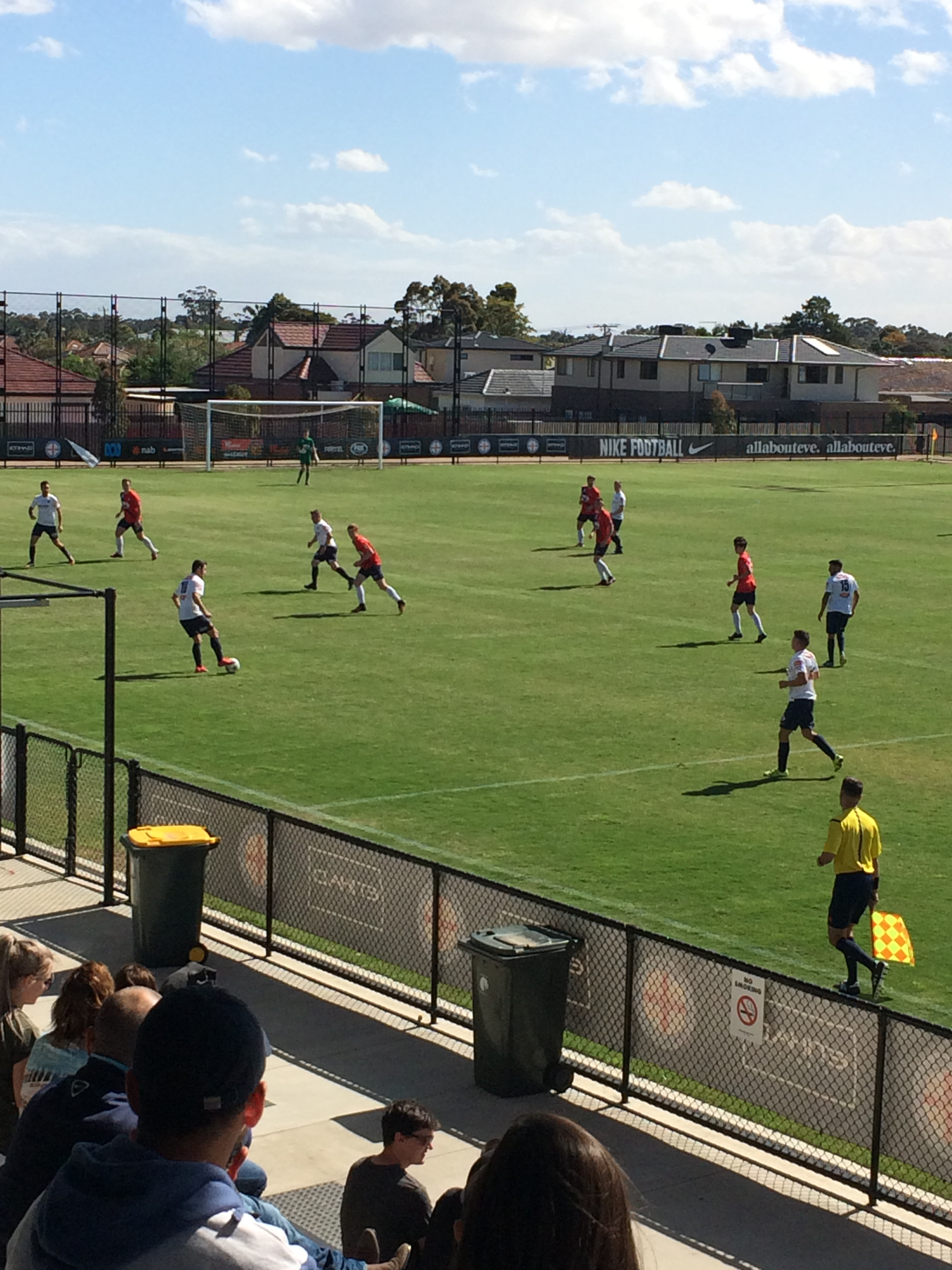
Pascoe Vale vs South Hobart in a friendly at CB Smith Reserve on 17 December 2016

=== National Premier Leagues Victoria (2014–present) ===
In the newly formed National Premier Leagues Victoria, the new top tier of football in Victoria, Pascoe Vale finished 11th in a 14 team competition in 2014.

Despite being tipped by some as relegation candidates at the start of the year, Pascoe Vale finished in 6th place in 2015, qualifying for the finals series. Pascoe Vale came up against Heidelberg United in the elimination final and progressed on penalties. Facing South Melbourne at Lakeside Stadium, Pascoe Vale conceded two late goals in extra time to go down 3–2. This semi-final finish was the furthest Pascoe Vale had ever reached in a top flight season. The 2015 season also marked the first season Pascoe Vale played out of their new home ground at CB Smith Reserve, a newly built $6.3m facility.

Prior to the 2016 season, Pascoe Vale SC announced they would adopt a new name and logo, proceeding onward as the Pascoe Vale Football Club. Their new logo was inspired by the shepherding origins of the clubs founders. Pascoe Vale finished the 2016 season in 7th place, with Van't Schip scored 9 goals and taking out the club's Golden Boot award.

In 2017, Pascoe Vale formed its inaugural senior women's team. Pascoe Vale's female participation more than doubled in 2017 to five female teams in total. The men's team finished the season in 7th place, placing themselves just outside the finals series. Davey Van't Schip scored 17 goals to take out the club's Golden Boot award yet again and was only second in the league to Heidelberg's Kenny Athiu, who scored 21 times. Tomi Milardovic retired at the end of the season, after five seasons at the club.

In 2018, Pascoe Vale finished the season in 4th place, qualifying for the finals series where it lost 2–1 to Oakleigh Cannons in the elimination final. Van't Schip was the top scorer for the third season running, this time with 15 goals, the fourth highest tally in the league.

From January 2019, Pascoe Vale player Hakeem al-Araibi, a political dissident from Bahrain, was being held in Thailand pending deportation to Bahrain.This attracted much media attention and a campaign for his quick and safe return was spearheaded by the club, with support from Craig Foster. He was released in February of the same year after the government of Bahrain withdrew their extradition request, and arrived at Melbourne Airport on 12 February to much publicity.

In June 2019, long-serving head coach Vitale Ferrante resigned after eight years in charge. His brother Michael Ferrante, along with Luca Santili and Davey Van’t Schip also departed the club, while David Chick was named as the new head coach. In August 2019, Pascoe Vale were relegated from NPL Victoria, finishing in bottom place.

After strong performances during the cancelled 2020 & 2021 seasons, they would just miss out on promotion in the 2022 NPL2 season under the care of Alex Cobo. In the disappointing 2023 season, a change in coach led to Ante Moric taking the reins for the latter half of the season, where they finished the season at the bottom of the table.

Nevertheless, 2023 was still a positive year for the club, as their Senior Women won their first ever league title after finishing first in State League 3 North.

Ahead of the 2025 season they have re-signed Dandenong Thunder’s 2012 treble-winning captain Shane Rexhepi as head coach, and have completed a multi million dollar redevelopment of their true home ground, Hosken Reserve.

== Honours ==
=== Men ===
- Victorian Provisional League Division 4 Runners-Up 1982
- Victorian Provisional League Division 3 Runners-Up 1983
- Victorian Provisional League Division 2 Champions 1984
- Victorian Provisional League Division 1 Third 1986
- Victorian State League Division 4 Champions 1992
- Victorian State League Division 3 North-West Runners-Up 2001
- Victorian State League Division 2 North-West Champions 2008
- Victorian State League Division 1 Champions 2012
- National Premier Leagues Victoria Finalists 2015 (Semi-Final), 2018 (Elimination Final)

=== Women ===
- Victorian State League Division 4 North Runners-Up 2017
- Victorian State League Division 3 North Champions 2023
