= KGV Park =

Association football ground in Hobart, Tasmania

- Interactive map of KGV Park
- Location: Glenorchy, Tasmania
- Coordinates: 42°49′53″S 147°16′37″E
- Owner: Glenorchy City Council
- Operator: Glenorchy City Council
- Capacity: 4,000
- Surface: Synthetic

Tenants
- Football Tasmania; Glenorchy Knights

KGV Park, or simply KGV (King George V) is an association football stadium that is home to Football Tasmania, the governing body for association football in Tasmania, and home to the Glenorchy Knights football team. It is referred to as the Home of Football in Tasmania. It is located in the heart of Glenorchy less than 1 kilometre from the Glenorchy CBD, 7 kilometres from Hobart City.

== Current use ==
KGV Park is owned by Glenorchy City Council with parcels of the site being owned by the Hobart Young Men's Christian Association and private residences that back onto the perimeter of the football pitch. KGV is home to the Glenorchy Knights football club who play home matches in the NPL Tasmania and lower grades at the ground. It formerly used to host South Hobart FC and was noted for hosting an incident during a 2014 FFA Cup match against Tuggeranong United FC where the commentary team first referred to the yellow card as the "slice of cheese", which eventually became common Australian slang for a yellow card.

It is also used for all major football matches played in the South of Tasmania, including Statewide Cup Finals and Statewide Finals Series Matches.

In 2010, A-League side Central Coast Mariners played a Tasmanian representative side in front of a crowd of around 2,000 people.

== Redevelopment ==
In December 2012 KGV Park was resurfaced with an artificial turf pitch. The new surface included Poligras synthetic grass and an in situ rubber shock pad was installed by Grassports Australia to FIFA 2 star standard. by 2025, the works had been completed, which had included new changing rooms and toilets.
