= Valley Road Ground =

Football ground in Devonport, Tasmania

- Interactive map of Valley Road Ground
- Location: Devonport
- Coordinates: 41°11′05.9″S 146°20′13.7″E
- Capacity: 3,500
- Surface: Synthetic

Tenant
- Devonport City FC

Valley Road Ground is an association football ground in Devonport, Tasmania. It is the home ground of Devonport City FC. The ground is located at the point where the suburbs of Hillcrest, Highfields and Broadhurst meet.
