= Riverside Olympic FC =

Riverside Olympic
- Full name: Riverside Olympic Football Club
- Founded: 1968
- Ground: Windsor Park, Launceston
- Capacity: 1,000
- Chairman: Mark Poulson
- Manager: Hélder Dos Santos Silva
- League: NPL Tasmania
- 2026: 6th of 10
- Website: https://www.riversideolympic.com.au/
Home colours

Riverside Olympic Football Club, is a soccer club which represents Launceston in the National Premier Leagues Tasmania. The club also fields 37 teams across all junior divisions. Riverside Olympic play their home games at Windsor Park, in Launceston, Tasmania.

Riverside has teams in the Northern Premier League, Premier League Reserves, Under 18's, Men's Division One and a Women's Team. Riverside Olympic were promoted to the Tasmanian State League in 1993.

== Honours ==
- State Championship Runners-up: 1973
- Northern Premierships: (7 times) 1973, 1990, 1991, 1992, 1998, 1999, 2018
- Steve Hudson Cup Winners: 2013
- Steve Hudson Cup Runners-Up: 2008

== Seasons - Men ==
Season	League												Statewide Cup	FFA Cup
Season	Name (national level)	Pld	W	D	L	GF	GA	GD	Pts	Position	Tasmanian Finals	NPL Finals	Statewide Cup	FFA Cup
2020	NPL Tasmania (2)	14	2	3	9	17	32	-15	9	7th	Not held	Cancelled	Round of 16	Cancelled
