= Devonport City FC =

Devonport City Strikers FC
- Full name: Devonport City Strikers Football Club
- Nickname: Strikers
- Founded: 1966 (Amalgamated in 1982)
- Ground: Valley Road Ground
- Capacity: 3,500 (Record Crowd – 3,168)
- President: Drew Smith
- Manager: Brian Murphy
- League: NPL Tasmania
- 2026: 2nd of 10
- Website: https://devonportstrikers.com.au/
Home colours

Devonport City Strikers Football Club, or the "Strikers" is a soccer club based in Devonport, Tasmania. It competes in the National Premier Leagues, the second-tier of Australian football.

The club was founded in 1952 as an amalgamation of Devonport and Devonport Rovers and has won the Tasmania title ten times, most recently in 2023. The club plays at the 3500 capacity Valley Road Ground and fields teams in all junior divisions and women's.

== History ==
=== 1950s ===
1950– Soccer starts on the North West Coast. A meeting was held in the Bay View Hotel in Burnie to form an association. As a result of the meeting four teams were formed. APPM, Burnie Celtic, Penguin and The Advocate. The Advocate team folded soon after due to a lack of players.

1952– Devonport united plays in the NWTSA. Little is known or recorded about the history of soccer in Devonport but a team formed by Norman Holmes played in the North-West league in 1952. Norman Holmes is a life member of the Devonport City Soccer Club. Games were played at St George's oval. A team from Railton also played in the Coastal roster. Teams were APPM, Burnie Celtic, Penguin, Devonport and Railton.

1954– It is not known why but Devonport and Railton did not participate in the 1954 Roster

=== 1960s ===
1961– It was not until 1961 that Devonport United was officially established at the well attended meeting on Wednesday 3 May. The club affiliated with the NWTSA and joined the roster on 3 June. Devonport United made an impressive debut when held by the strong Ulverstone side to a 2–1 loss. The Ulverstone Club was also formed in 1961 and played from the start of the season. Members of the original Railton Club donated their blue and gold boxed square strip to the newly formed Devonport Club. Home games were played at the Devonport Showgrounds and at the Spreyton Racecourse.

1965– Devonport United moved to Byard Park and shared the ground with the newly formed Mersey Soccer Club. The old wooden shed that was used as change rooms had no toilet facilities, no electricity and no showers. Monthly meetings were held with the use of lanterns. In 1965 the clubs requested Devonport Council to have Byard Park fenced as the clubs desperately needed an enclosed ground. The council replied that Byard Park, when purchased from the Byard family had to remain open parkland and the development of a Soccer Centre at Coles Beach road would be to the advantage of both clubs interests.

1966– August. Devonport United and Mersey ask the council for a date for the start of development at Coles Beach. In November, Mersey and Devonport amalgamated at a special meeting held at the Adult Education Centre. The main objective was to continue discussions with council for a ground for the exclusive use of soccer.

1967– August. Council advise that the Coles Beach plan has to be abandoned because the area was insufficient in size for the full development. As an alternative council have plans for a soccer centre to be located on the newly acquired Baptist Church property in the Valley Road area. Pending completion of these plans the possibility of the club using Girdlestone Oval on alternative Saturdays to the East Devonport Football Club was pro-posed.

1968– October. Council writes and asks what financial assistance the club is prepared to make towards the establishment of Valley Road. The club offers $600 per year.

1969– 14 April. In a lengthy letter from the club's Secretary, Ernie Armsby writes- “Negotiations have been proceeding with council for several year and members are losing heart that a soccer centre would not eventuate and suggest making St. Georges Oval their permanent home. The club will accept responsibility for erecting the fence.” On 18 April the council writes that Spreyton Racecourse Committee agree to using the ground. On 1 May the council writes that St George Oval be set aside as future headquarters. On 13 June, the council advises that they have received an objection from a resident in East Devonport to a fence and the council offers the use of Don Cricket Clubs grounds. The Cricket Club agrees. On 23 October, Council Executive and Soccer Club representatives meet to discuss developments. On 28 October, we have pleasure in advising that the council authorises the immediate development on a Soccer Centre in the Valley Road area.

=== 1970s ===
1970– 13 March the council considers tenders for the construction of change rooms at Valley Road for the sum of $16,561. Wilkins, Grey and Dowling are contracted to complete construction by 29 May. In August, the Club asks the council to start work on the playing area.

1971– 18 July. Devonport Soccer Club uses Valley Road for the first time. The club experiences difficulties because of the approach path from Valley Road. (At this time Lovett St did not exist.)

1972– March. The soccer club seeks council permission to erect lights for training. Cost $3,000

1972– 3 June Valley Road Soccer Centre is officially opened by Councillor Percy Williams, Warden of Devonport. Devonport beats Hobart Metro 3–2 in an Ampol Cup Game on the opening day and soccer in Devonport came of age. Later in 1972, Lovett Street was constructed and the Valley Road Soccer Centre was open to traffic.

1973– September. Soccer Club runs Night Soccer Series sponsored by Norco Batteries and The Advocate Newspaper.

1975 – Australian Federal Government announces "Red Scheme", an initiative where sporting clubs could apply for building projects. The Soccer Club applies and is granted $13,795 for clubroom extensions. The club erects a grand stand which costs $12,000. They also upgrade floodlights on the main ground and erect lights on the training ground. The cost of which is $20,000 from club funds.

1976– 16 May. Bingo starts and becomes so popular that the club obtains a loan from the council for $40,000 for extensions. Plans included an office and a large lounge area. Further extensions were necessary and a loan of $30,000 was obtained from the ANZ Bank. During the 1980s Devonport City welcomed overseas coaches. In 1980, Steve Darby from Liverpool. In 1982, Bob Oates from Scunthorpe and in 1985, Phil Ashworth from Rochdale.

=== 1980s ===
1987– 13 October at 1:30 am FIRE DESTROYS CLUBROOMS. Sadly, eight days after the carnival ended, the Devonport City Soccer clubrooms were burnt to the ground. Total Damage in excess of $350,000.

1987– 17 October. The Club meets the Council's Executive to apply for a Tasmanian Government Grant. A$220,000 grant was approved and along with $275,000 insurance on the destroyed clubrooms plans were drawn up for a new clubroom with a total cost of $475,000. Work started on 4 March 1988 and were completed on 30 August. The club was officially opened by the Hon. Tony Rundle, MHA on 10 September. The club rooms and contents were valued at $650,000.

1989– George Best, rated as one of the world's best soccer players visits Devonport. About 1000 soccer fans from throughout Tasmania converged on Valley Road to see George Best in action. George Best, former Manchester United and Northern Island player came out for Devonport City against a strong Tasmanian side. The match ended in a 2–2 draw.

=== 1990s and 2000s ===
Devonport experienced a period of dominance in the 1992, '93 and '94 seasons, topping the league table in all three years. This was during a time when Football Tasmania had introduced a play-off series for the Premiership, with a top 4 play-off series. It would be heartbreak for Devonport in the '92 and '93 seasons, where they were defeated in Grand Finals to Glenorchy Knights 2-0 (1992) and then the following year to Hobart Zebras 2-1 (1993). The 1994 season saw a change in fortunes, where an undefeated league season was topped off with Grand Final success, where goals from Anthony Guilbert (2) and Adrian Mann resulted in a 3–2 victory over White Eagles, securing a much deserved first State Championship for the club.

They would also lose another Grand Final in 1997 when they played Hobart White Eagles again, only to lose 5–1.

Devonport continued to participate in the Tasmanian State League (equivalent to what is now known as the National Premier League - NPL) up to and including 1998 when they were forced to withdraw from the competition due to the increasing costs associated with travelling to and from Hobart every second week. They went out in style in the 1998 season, winning a second State Championship by finishing top of the league table ahead of Glenorchy Knights, by one point. A series of additional games were played following the league season, however Devonport did not participate in this as it had no bearing on them being league champions.

Devonport participated in the Northern Premier League (later Northern Championship) from the 1999 season until the reintroduction of the State League competition in 2013.

During the 2000s, they experienced may successful seasons, winning the league title in the 2000, 2002, 2003, 2004 and 2008 seasons. The 2002, 2003 and 2004 seasons were particularly successful, where along with winning the league title, Devonport were also successful in winning the following statewide titles:

2002: Lakoseljac Cup Winners - in an epic Cup Final, Devonport prevailed 4–3, after extra time, against Launceston City. Devonport opened the scoring through Chris McKenna in the first half, before Launceston City hit back with two goals of their own. A red card to Devonport's Marc Guilbert in the opening minutes of the second half, and subsequently scored penalty, gave Launceston the ascendancy, with a 3–1 lead and Devonport down to ten men. Devonport's reduced the deficit when a long range strike from John 'Snow' Compagne bounced over the head of the City keeper and into the net. Substitute Darren Chilcott sent the game to extra time, with a well placed finish to tie the score at 3–3 in the dying moments of the game. The match was to be decided by Golden Goal Extra-time and it was Devonport who found the winner through Andrew Howes composed finish.

2003: State Champions - After winning the league title in convincing fashion, only losing one game in the process, Devonport doubled up to win the State Championship by defeating southern league champions University at Valley Road. With a ruptured pipe under the main ground at Valley Road, the final was played on Valley Road's back ground, with the Devonport Council hastily setting up goals and marking a pitch across the two training grounds so the game could proceed. Two goals from Chris McKenna saw Devonport take the state title, with a 2–1 victory.

2004: State Champions - Devonport enjoyed an undefeated league season on the way to the league title in 2004, only dropping points in three drawn games. They took on Hobart Zebras at KGV in the State Championship decider, with two goals from John 'Snow' Compagne proving the difference, in a 2–1 win for Devonport.

=== 2010s ===
In July 2012, the club was granted admission into the new 8-team statewide league called the Victory League. The competition which started in 2013 would soon become the National Premier Leagues Tasmania in 2016 with the club taking home their first title after they defeated the Northern Rangers FC in the second to last round of the season. The team also qualified for the FFA Cup proper (round of 32) for the first time by beating South Hobart 1–0 in the final of the Lakoseljac Cup. They would take on the Lambton Jaffas at home and they won by a score of 1–0 to become the first Tasmanian team to reach the next round of the cup. In the Round of 16, they took on Bentleigh Greens SC at home and were defeated 0–1, with the winning goal coming in the first period of extra-time. That season would see Devonport take out the NPL Tasmania title for the first time which meant that they qualified through to the finals. In the first round of the Finals, they would lose 6–1 to Perth SC in the opening round.

After seeing the team finishing in third place in 2017, the team with Chris Gallo (who was re-signed for another year), won the double by taking out the Lakoseljac Cup over South Hobart 1–0. They would take out the league title after defeating Kingborough on the final day of the season to secure a spot in the NPL finals where they would lose to Heidelberg United in the first round. Devonport lost 3–2 with the last kick of the game.

2019 saw the resignation of head coach Chris Gallo and the appointment of new head coach Rick Coghlan. With the loss of several important players the Strikers calibre was questioned as the year began. The Strikers made the Lakoseljac Cup final before heartbreak saw them lose to South Hobart FC. but this did not deter them in the league as they went on to win with two games to spare. The victory saw the Strikers qualify for the National Premier League finals competition, where they would lose to Northern New South Wales representative, Maitland FC 3–2.

=== 2020s ===
With the state in the grip of the COVID-19 pandemic, the majority of winter sporting competitions in Tasmania were in danger of not being conducted at all. However restrictions managed to ease and a shortened 14-round NPL Tasmania season started in mid-July.

There was also a change to the coaching ranks, with Chris Gallo returning to the helm after Rick Coghlan took up a coaching position in Queensland.

While not reaching their free-flowing best at times, the Strikers were effective, going through their campaign with 13 wins and 1 draw to win the league title by nine points and only conceding nine goals in the process.

They were also considered league successes for the Northern Championship Men and Northern Championship 1 Men's teams.

The 2021 season was a new dawn for women's football at the club with the Strikers fielding a team in the Women's Super League for the first time. Under coach Mal Gorrie, the side acquitted themselves in their debut season, finishing fourth on the table with seven wins, three draws and eight losses from their 18 games.

NPL Tasmania men's team overcame a couple of early-season hiccups to find themselves back on top of the table towards the business end of the season. However, two losses in the final two games saw them relinquish their title to Glenorchy Knights in a end to the roster.

There was some silverware to celebrate for the men, with the team taking out the Lakoseljac Cup after an incredible penalty shootout win over Knights in the final. Goalkeeper Nathan Pitchford was the hero, pulling off a save to give the Strikers the victory. Unfortunately due to COVID protocols still in place, the team were had to withdraw from its FFA Cup Round of 32 clash against Avondale.

League titles were also claimed by our Northern Championship 1 Men and Under 18 Boys.

In 2022, there was a new voice in charge of the NPL Tasmania team, with Tom Ballantyne appointed to replace Chris Gallo. Under Ballantyne, the team enjoyed a dominant campaign, winning 19 of its 21 games to reclaim the league title by a massive 13 points, along with making it back-to-back Lakoseljac Cup triumphs with a 3–0 win over South Hobart.

In the ensuing Australia Cup Round of 32 draw, the Strikers hosted A-League opponents Wellington Phoenix, but despite a brave effort, went down 4–0 in front of the Valley Rd faithful.

The Women's Super League team continued to show improvement, winning 12 of its 18 games to finish third, while the Northern Championship 1 Men made it a hat-trick of league titles.

== Seasons – Men ==
Season	League												Statewide Cup	FFA Cup
Season	Name (national level)	Pld	W	D	L	GF	GA	GD	Pts	Position	Tasmanian Finals	NPL Finals	Statewide Cup	FFA Cup
2005	North Premier League (2)	16	12	3	1	45	14	+31	39	2nd	DNQ	Not yet founded	Round of 16	Not yet founded
2006	North Premier League (2)	16	6	2	8	28	28	0	20	7th	DNQ	Not yet founded	Round of 16	Not yet founded
2007	North Premier League (2)	16	11	2	3	54	15	+41	35	2nd	DNQ	Not yet founded	Round of 16	Not yet founded
2008	North Premier League (2)	16	14	1	1	59	14	+45	43	1st	Champions	Not yet founded	Final	Not yet founded
2009	North Premier League (2)	16	12	1	3	61	20	+41	37	2nd	Quarter-finals	Not yet founded	Round of 16	Not yet founded
2010	North Premier League (2)	16	11	3	2	52	26	26	36	2nd	Semi-finals	Not yet founded	Quarter-finals	Not yet founded
2011	North Premier League (2)	16	12	0	4	60	25	35	36	3rd	Semi-finals	Not yet founded	Semi-finals	Not yet founded
2012	North Premier League (2)	16	12	2	2	51	23	28	38	3rd	Semi-finals	Not yet founded	First round	Not yet founded
2013	Victory League (2)	21	13	2	6	68	38	30	41	2nd	Final	DNQ	Quarter-finals	Not yet founded
2014	Victory League (2)	21	9	2	10	49	49	0	29	5th	DNQ	DNQ	Quarter-finals	DNQ
2015	Victory League (2)	21	6	3	12	42	51	−9	21	7th	DNQ	DNQ	Round of 16	DNQ
2016	NPL Tasmania (2)	21	19	1	1	61	10	+51	58	1st	Runners-up	Quarter-finals	Winners	Round of 16
2017	NPL Tasmania (2)	21	13	2	6	53	30	+23	41	3rd	Quarter-finals	DNQ	Quarter-finals	DNQ
2018	NPL Tasmania (2)	21	16	2	3	69	18	+51	50	1st	N/A	Quarter-finals	Winners	Round of 16
2019	NPL Tasmania (2)	24	20	2	2	91	23	+68	62	1st	N/A	Quarter-finals	Runners-up	DNQ
2020	NPL Tasmania (2)	14	13	1	0	28	9	+19	40	1st	Not held	Cancelled	Round of 16	Cancelled
2021	NPL Tasmania (2)	21	15	2	4	54	15	+39	47	2nd	Not held	Cancelled	Winners	Cancelled
2022	NPL Tasmania (2)	21	19	1	1	71	11	+60	58	1st	Not held	Cancelled	Winners	Round of 32
2023	NPL Tasmania (2)	21	18	1	2	68	17	+51	55	1st	Runners-up	Cancelled	Winners	Round of 32
2024	NPL Tasmania (2)	21	13	6	2	60	19	+41	45	3rd	Not held		Semi-finals	DNQ
2025	NPL Tasmania (2)	21	10	5	6	57	32	+25	35	4th	Not held		Quarter-finals	DNQ
2026	NPL Tasmania (2)	18	14	1	3	65	16	+49	43	2nd	Runners-up		Runners-up	DNQ

== Honours ==
- Milan Lakoseljac Cup: 7 times (1977, 2002, 2016, 2018, 2021, 2022 & 2023)
- State Championships: 4 times (1994, 1998, 2003, 2004)
- NPL Tasmania Premiership: 6 times (2016, 2018, 2019, 2020, 2022, 2023)
- State Championships Runners-up: 2 times as Devonport (1974, 1977), 7 times as Devonport City (1982, 1983, 1992, 1993, 1997, 2002, 2008)
- Northern Premierships: 7 times (2000, 2002, 2003, 2004, 2008, 2016, 2020) 4 times as Devonport Rovers (1985,1987,1988,1989) 2 times as Devonport (1974,1977)
- Under 21s Statewide Cup: 2 times (2023, 2025)
- Under 21s State League: 2 times (2024, 2025)
- Women's State Championships: 3 times (2024, 2025, 2026)
- Women's Statewide Cup: 3 times (2024, 2025, 2026)

== Stadium ==
The Devonport Strikers play at Valley Road Ground in Devonport, Tasmania. The stadium has a capacity of approximately 3,500.

There is a large clubhouse on the northern end. In front of the clubhouse there are 164 mostly undercover seats. While the western, southern and eastern ends are car parks, with some space for spectators to stand and watch games.

In 2023, the club demolished the only grandstand, a wooden grandstand on the northern end, called the Gordon Rimmer Stand. In October 2023, the club commenced construction of a much larger grandstand on the northern end and completed the construction in June 2025. The new grandstand has 820 undercover seats.

In May 2024, the club announced plans to build a new grandstand on the western end. The new grandstand is expected to have approximately 965 undercover seats.
