= List of soccer clubs in Australia =

This is a list of soccer clubs in Australia. The Australian soccer league system consists of one national league — A-League Men — a state/territory-based second tier National Premier Leagues (NPL) structure and followed by state-based metropolitan and regional leagues. Promotion and relegation exists in some states between NPL and state leagues, however not between the A-League Men and the NPL.

== List of leagues and divisions ==
Clubs from the following competitions and those eligible for national cups are included on the list below. Reserve teams, or instances where one club fields teams in multiple divisions, are not included.

- A-League Men (Level 1)
- National Premier Leagues (Level 2)
  - National Premier Leagues Capital Football
  - National Premier Leagues NSW
  - National Premier Leagues Northern NSW
  - National Premier Leagues Queensland
  - National Premier Leagues South Australia
  - National Premier Leagues Tasmania
  - National Premier Leagues Victoria
  - National Premier Leagues Western Australia
- Capital Football
  - Capital Premier League (Level 3)
  - Capital Football State League (Levels 4–12)
- Football NSW
  - Football NSW League One (Level 3)
  - Football NSW League Two (Level 4)
  - Illawarra Premier League, Western Premier League, Central Coast Premier League (Level 5)
  - Illawarra District League, Central Coast Division One (Level 6)
- Northern NSW Football
  - Northern League One (Level 3)
  - Zone Football League One (Level 4)
  - Zone Football League Two (Level 5)
  - Zone Football League Three (Level 6)
- Football Northern Territory
  - NorZone Premier League (Level 2)
- Football Queensland
  - Football Queensland Premier League 1 (Level 3)
  - Football Queensland Premier League 2 (Level 4)
  - Football Queensland Premier League 3 (Central Coast, Darling Downs, Far North & Gulf, Metro, Northern, South Coast, Sunshine Coast, Whitsunday Coast, Wide Bay) (Level 5)
  - Football Queensland Premier League 4 (Metro, South Coast) (Level 6)
  - Football Queensland Premier League 5 (Metro) (Level 7)
  - Football Queensland Premier League 6 (Metro) (Level 8)
- Football South Australia
  - State League 1 South Australia (Level 3)
  - State League 2 South Australia (Level 4)
- Football Tasmania
  - Northern Championship (Level 3)
  - Southern Championship (Level 3)
  - Northern Championship One (Level 4)
  - Southern Championship One (Level 4)
  - Northern Social League (Level 5)
  - Southern Social League (Level 5)
  - Southern Social League Two (Level 6)
  - Southern Social League Three (Level 7)
  - Southern Social League Four (Level 8)
- Football Victoria
  - Victorian Premier League 1 (Level 3)
  - Victorian Premier League 2 (Level 4)
  - Victorian State League 1 (Level 5)
  - Victorian State League 2 (Level 6)
  - Victorian State League 3 (Level 7)
  - Victorian State League 4 (Level 8)
  - Victorian State League 5 (Level 9)
  - Victorian State League 6 (Level 10)
  - Victorian State League 7 (Level 11)
- Football West
  - Football West State League Division 1 (Level 3)
  - Football West State League Division 2 (Level 4)

== List of clubs ==
The divisions are correct for the 2025 and 2024–25 seasons.

=== Key ===
Key to divisional changes
New club
Club was promoted to a higher level.
Club was relegated to a lower level.

Club	League/Division	Level	State	City	Change
AC Carina	Football Queensland Premier League 3 – Metro	5	Queensland	Brisbane	Promoted from Football Queensland Premier League 4 – Metro
Acacia Ridge	Football Queensland Premier League 4 – Metro	6	Queensland	Brisbane	Relegated from Football Queensland Premier League 3 – Metro
Across the Waves	Football Queensland Premier League – Wide Bay	5	Queensland	Bundaberg	
Adamstown Rosebud	National Premier Leagues Northern NSW	2	New South Wales	Newcastle	
Adelaide Atletico	State League 2 South Australia	4	South Australia	Adelaide	
Adelaide Blue Eagles	State League 1 South Australia	3	South Australia	Adelaide	
Adelaide City	National Premier Leagues South Australia	2	South Australia	Adelaide	
Adelaide Comets	National Premier Leagues South Australia	2	South Australia	Adelaide	
Adelaide Croatia Raiders	National Premier Leagues South Australia	2	South Australia	Adelaide	
Adelaide Hills Hawks	State League 2 South Australia	4	South Australia	Adelaide	
Adelaide Olympic	State League 1 South Australia	3	South Australia	Adelaide	Relegated from National Premier Leagues South Australia
Adelaide Omonia Cobras	State League 1 South Australia	3	South Australia	Adelaide	
Adelaide Titans	State League 2 South Australia	4	South Australia	Adelaide	
Adelaide United	A-League Men	1	South Australia	Adelaide	
Adelaide ea	State League 2 South Australia	4	South Australia	Adelaide	
Annerley FC	Football Queensland Premier League 4 – Metro	6	Queensland	Brisbane	
Albert Park	Victorian State League 4	8	Victoria	Melbourne	
Albion Park White Eagles	Illawarra Premier League	5	New South Wales	Wollongong	
Albion Rovers	Victorian State League 2	6	Victoria	Melbourne	
Alphington	Victorian State League 5	9	Victoria	Melbourne	
Altona City	Victorian Premier League 2	4	Victoria	Melbourne	
Altona East Phoenix	Victorian State League 2	6	Victoria	Melbourne	
Altona Magic	National Premier Leagues Victoria	2	Victoria	Melbourne	
Altona North	Victorian State League 3	7	Victoria	Melbourne	
APIA Leichhardt	National Premier Leagues NSW	2	New South Wales	Sydney	
Armadale	National Premier Leagues Western Australia	2	Western Australia	Perth	
Ashburton United	Victorian State League 3	7	Victoria	Melbourne	
Ashfield	Football West State League Division 2	4	Western Australia	Perth	
Aspendale	Victorian State League 5	9	Victoria	Melbourne	
Avoca FC	Central Coast Premier League	5	New South Wales	Central Coast	
Avondale	National Premier Leagues Victoria	2	Victoria	Melbourne	
Auckland FC (Note: New Zealand club playing in Australian league system.)	A-League Men	1	New Zealand	Auckland	New club
Australian Catholic University	Football Queensland Premier League 6 – Metro	8	Queensland	Brisbane	
Australian Defence Force Academy	Capital League Division 3	6	Australian Capital Territory	Canberra	
Australian National University	Capital Premier League	3	Australian Capital Territory	Canberra	
Balcatta Etna	National Premier Leagues Western Australia	2	Western Australia	Perth	
Balga	Football West State League Division 2	4	Western Australia	Perth	
Balgownie Rangers	Illawarra District League	6	New South Wales	Wollongong	
Ballarat City	Victorian State League 1	5	Victoria	Ballarat	
Ballarat SC	Victorian State League 5	9	Victoria	Ballarat	
Belmoral	Victorian State League 4	8	Victoria	Melbourne	
Bankstown City	Football NSW League One	3	New South Wales	Sydney	
Bankstown United	Football NSW League Two	4	New South Wales	Sydney	
Banyule City	Victorian State League 1	5	Victoria	Melbourne	
Bardon Latrobe	Football Queensland Premier League 4 – Metro	6	Queensland	Brisbane	
Bargara	Football Queensland Premier League – Wide Bay	5	Queensland	Bundaberg	
Baringa FC	Football Queensland Premier League 3 – Sunshine Coast	5	Queensland	Sunshine Coast	
Barnsley	Zone Football League Three	6	New South Wales	Newcastle	
Barnstoneworth Scrappers	Southern Social League	5	Tasmania	Hobart	
Barnstone United	Victorian State League 4	8	Victoria	Melbourne	
Barwon	Victorian State League 4	8	Victoria	Geelong	
Bathurst '75	Western Premier League	5	New South Wales	Bathurst	
Baxter	Victorian State League 4	8	Victoria	Melbourne	
Bayside Argonauts	Victorian State League 1	5	Victoria	Melbourne	Promoted from Victorian State League 2
Bayside United	Football Queensland Premier League 3 – Metro	5	Queensland	Brisbane	Relegated from Football Queensland Premier League 2
Bayswater City	National Premier Leagues Western Australia	2	Western Australia	Perth	
Beaumaris	Victorian State League 1	5	Victoria	Melbourne	Relegated from Victorian Premier League 2
Beerwah Glasshouse United	Football Queensland Premier League 3 – Sunshine Coast	5	Queensland	Sunshine Coast	
Belconnen United	Capital Premier League	3	Australian Capital Territory	Canberra	
Bell Park	Victorian State League 4	8	Victoria	Geelong	
Bellambi	Illawarra District League	6	South Coast	Wollongong	
Belmont Swansea United	Northern League One	3	New South Wales	Lake Macquarie	
Belnorth	Capital League Division 5	8	Australian Capital Territory	Canberra	
Belsouth	Capital League Division 9	12	Australian Capital Territory	Canberra	
Belwest Foxes	Capital League Division 5	8	Australian Capital Territory	Canberra	
Bendigo City	Victorian State League 5	9	Victoria	Bendigo	
Bentleigh Greens	Victorian Premier League 1	3	Victoria	Melbourne	
Bentleigh United Cobras	Victorian State League 2	6	Victoria	Melbourne	
Berkeley Sports	Illawarra District League	6	South Coast	Wollongong	
Bethania Rams	Football Queensland Premier League 5 – Metro	7	Queensland	Logan City	Promoted from Football Queensland Premier League 6 – Metro
Berkeley Vale	Central Coast Premier League	5	New South Wales	Central Coast	
Berwick City	Victorian State League 2	6	Victoria	Melbourne	
Bingera	Football Queensland Premier League – Wide Bay	5	Queensland	Bundaberg	
Birrarung	Victorian State League 5	9	Victoria	Melbourne	
Blacktown City	National Premier Leagues NSW	2	New South Wales	Sydney	
Blacktown Spartans	Football NSW League One	3	New South Wales	Sydney	
Bluebirds FC	Football Queensland Premier League – Central Coast	5	Queensland	Rockhampton	
Bolwarra Lorn	Zone Football League Two	5	New South Wales	Newcastle	
Bonnyrigg White Eagles	Football NSW League One	3	New South Wales	Sydney	
Boronia	Victorian State League 5	9	Victoria	Melbourne	Relegated from Victorian State League 4
Boroondara-Carey Eagles	Victorian Premier League 2	4	Victoria	Melbourne	
Box Hill United	Victorian Premier League 2	4	Victoria	Melbourne	
Brandon Park	Victorian State League 1	5	Victoria	Melbourne	
Bribie Island Tigers	Football Queensland Premier League 6 – Metro	8	Queensland	Brisbane	
Brighton	Victorian State League 5	9	Victoria	Melbourne	Relegated from Victorian State League 4
Brighton Bulldogs	Football Queensland Premier League 5 – Metro	7	Queensland	Brisbane	Relegated from Football Queensland Premier League 4 – Metro
Brimbank Stallions	Victorian State League 1	5	Victoria	Melbourne	
Brindabella Blues	Capital Premier League	3	Australian Capital Territory	Canberra	
Brisbane City	National Premier Leagues Queensland	2	Queensland	Brisbane	
Brisbane Knights	Football Queensland Premier League 2	4	Queensland	Brisbane	Promoted from Football Queensland Premier League 3 – South Coast
Brisbane Roar	A-League Men	1	Queensland	Brisbane	
Brisbane Strikers	Football Queensland Premier League 1	3	Queensland	Brisbane	
Broadbeach United	Football Queensland Premier League 1	3	Queensland	Gold Coast	
Broadmeadow Magic	National Premier Leagues Northern NSW	2	New South Wales	Newcastle	
Brothers Aston Villa	Football Queensland Premier League – Wide Bay	5	Queensland	Bundaberg	
Brothers Townsville	Football Queensland Premier League – Northern	5	Queensland	Townsville	
Brunswick City	Victorian Premier League 1	3	Victoria	Melbourne	
Brunswick Juventus	Victorian Premier League 2	4	Victoria	Melbourne	
Brunswick Zebras	Victorian State League 3	7	Victoria	Melbourne	
Budgewoi	Central Coast Premier League	5	New South Wales	Central Coast	
Bulleen Lions	Victorian Premier League 1	3	Victoria	Melbourne	
Bulli	Illawarra Premier League	5	New South Wales	Wollongong	
Bundoora United	Victorian State League 3	7	Victoria	Melbourne	
Bunyip District	Victorian State League 5	9	Victoria	Bunyip	
Burdekin	Football Queensland Premier League – Northern	5	Queensland	Ayr	
Burleigh Heads	Football Queensland Premier League 3 – South Coast	5	Queensland	Gold Coast	
Burnie United	Northern Championship	3	Tasmania	Burnie	
Burns FC	Capital League Division 3	6	Australian Capital Territory	Canberra	
Burwood City	Victorian State League 5	9	Victoria	Melbourne	
Caboolture Sports	Football Queensland Premier League 1	3	Queensland	Brisbane	
Caloundra	Football Queensland Premier League 3 – Sunshine Coast	5	Queensland	Sunshine Coast	
Camden Tigers	Football NSW League Two	4	New South Wales	Sydney	
Campbelltown City	National Premier Leagues South Australia	2	South Australia	Adelaide	
Canberra City	Capital League Division 1	4	Australian Capital Territory	Canberra	
Canberra Croatia	National Premier Leagues Capital Football	2	Australian Capital Territory	Canberra	
Canberra Juventus	Capital Premier League	3	Australian Capital Territory	Canberra	
Canberra Olympic	Capital Premier League	3	Australian Capital Territory	Canberra	Relegated from National Premier Leagues Capital Football
Canberra White Eagles	Capital Premier League	3	Australian Capital Territory	Canberra	
Canning City	Football West State League Division 2	4	Western Australia	Perth	
Canterbury Bankstown	Football NSW League One	3	New South Wales	Sydney	
Capalaba	Football Queensland Premier League 1	3	Queensland	Brisbane	
Capricorn Coast	Football Queensland Premier League – Central Coast	5	Queensland	Yeppoon	
Cardiff City	Zone Football League One	4	New South Wales	Newcastle	
Carramar Shamrock Rovers	Football West State League Division 2	4	Western Australia	Perth	
Caroline Springs George Cross	Victorian Premier League 1	3	Victoria	Melbourne	
Casey Comets	Victorian State League 2	6	Victoria	Melbourne	Relegated from Victorian State League 1
Casey Panthers	Victorian State League 5	9	Victoria	Melbourne	
Casuarina	NorZone Premier League	2	Northern Territory	Darwin	
Centenary Stormers	Football Queensland Premier League 3 – Metro	5	Queensland	Brisbane	
Central Coast Mariners	A-League Men	1	New South Wales	Gosford	
Central Coast United	Football NSW League Two	4	New South Wales	Gosford	
Central FC	Football Queensland Premier League – Central Coast	5	Queensland	Gladstone	
Cessnock City Hornets	Northern League One	3	New South Wales	Cessnock	
Charlestown Azzurri	National Premier Leagues Northern NSW	2	New South Wales	Lake Macquarie	
Charlestown Junior	Zone Football League Three	6	New South Wales	Newcastle	
Chelsea	Victorian State League 4	8	Victoria	Melbourne	
Chisholm United	Victorian State League 2	6	Victoria	Melbourne	
City Brothers	Football Queensland Premier League – Whitsunday Coast	5	Queensland	Mackay	
Clarence Zebras	National Premier Leagues Tasmania	2	Tasmania	Hobart	
Cleeland United	Victorian State League 5	9	Victoria	Melbourne	
Clifton Hill	Victorian State League 1	5	Victoria	Melbourne	
Clinton	Football Queensland Premier League – Central Coast	5	Queensland	Gladstone	
Cockburn City	Football West State League Division 2	4	Western Australia	Perth	Relgated from Football West State League Division 1
Collingwood City	Victorian State League 1	5	Victoria	Melbourne	
Coniston FC	Illawarra Premier League	5	New South Wales	Wollongong	
Cooks Hill United	National Premier Leagues Northern NSW	2	New South Wales	Newcastle	
Coolum	Football Queensland Premier League 3 – Sunshine Coast	5	Queensland	Sunshine Coast	
Cooma FC (Note: The official name of Cooma Football Club's National Premier Leagues side is "Tigers FC".)	National Premier Leagues Capital Football	2	Australian Capital Territory (Note: Team based in New South Wales but playing in Australian Capital Territory competition.)	Canberra	
Coomera Colts	Football Queensland Premier League 3 – South Coast	5	Queensland	Gold Coast	
Corio	Victorian State League 1	5	Victoria	Geelong	
Corrimal Rangers	Illawarra Premier League	5	New South Wales	Wollongong	
CQU Berserker	Football Queensland Premier League – Central Coast	5	Queensland	Rockhampton	
Craigieburn City	Victorian State League 2	6	Victoria	Melbourne	
Cringila Lions	Illawarra Premier League	5	New South Wales	Wollongong	
Crossroads	State League Division 6	9	Australian Capital Territory	Canberra	
Croudace Bay United	Zone Football League Two	5	New South Wales	Newcastle	
Croydon	National Premier Leagues South Australia	2	South Australia	Adelaide	
Croydon City Arrows	Victorian State League 3	7	Victoria	Melbourne	Promoted from Victorian State League 4
Cumberland United	State League 1 South Australia	3	South Australia	Adelaide	
Curtin University	Football West State League Division 1	3	Western Australia	Perth	Promoted from Football West State League Division 2
Dallas City	Victorian State League 2	6	Victoria	Melbourne	
Dandenong City	National Premier Leagues Victoria	2	Victoria	Melbourne	
Dandenong South	Victorian State League 3	7	Victoria	Melbourne	
Dandenong Thunder	National Premier Leagues Victoria	2	Victoria	Melbourne	
Darebin United	Victorian State League 4	8	Victoria	Melbourne	
Darwin Hearts	NorZone Premier League	3	Northern Territory	Darwin	
Darwin Olympic	NorZone Premier League	2	Northern Territory	Darwin	
Darwin Rovers	NorZone Premier League	2	Northern Territory	Darwin	
Deakin University	Victorian State League 4	8	Victoria	Melbourne	Promoted from Victorian State League 5
Deception Bay	Football Queensland Premier League 6 − Metro	8	Queensland	Brisbane	
Devonport City	National Premier Leagues Tasmania	2	Tasmania	Devonport	
Diamond Valley United	Victorian State League 3	7	Victoria	Melbourne	
Dianella White Eagles	Football West State League Division 1	3	Western Australia	Perth	
Docklands Athletic	Victorian State League 4	8	Victoria	Melbourne	
Doncaster Rovers	Victorian State League 2	6	Victoria	Melbourne	
Dominic Old Scholars Association	Southern Social League Two	6	Tasmania	Hobart	
Doon Villa	Football Queensland Premier League – Wide Bay	5	Queensland	Maryborough	
Doreen United	Victorian State League 5	9	Victoria	Melbourne	
Doveton	Victorian State League 1	5	Victoria	Melbourne	Relegated from Victorian Premier League 2
Doyalson Wyee	Central Coast Division One	6	New South Wales	Doyalson	
Dudley United	Northern League One	3	New South Wales	Newcastle	Promoted from Zone Football League One
Dubbo Bulls	Western Premier League	5	New South Wales	Dubbo	
Dulwich Hill	Football NSW League One	3	New South Wales	Sydney	
Dunbar Rovers	Football NSW League Two	4	New South Wales	Sydney	Relegated from Football NSW League One
East Bentleigh Strikers	Victorian State League 5	9	Victoria	Melbourne	
East Gosford	Central Coast Premier League	5	New South Wales	Gosford	
East Kew	Victorian State League 4	8	Victoria	Melbourne	Promoted from Victorian State League 5
East Perth	Football West State League Division 2	4	Western Australia	Perth	
Eastern Lions	Victorian Premier League 1	3	Victoria	Melbourne	
Eastern Suburbs	National Premier Leagues Queensland	2	Queensland	Brisbane	Promoted from Football Queensland Premier League
Eastern United	State League 2 South Australia	4	South Australia	Adelaide	
Edge Hill United	Football Queensland Premier League – Far North & Gulf	5	Queensland	Cairns	
Edgeworth	National Premier Leagues Northern NSW	2	New South Wales	Lake Macquarie	
Elizabeth Grove	State League 2 South Australia	4	South Australia	Adelaide	
Eltham Redbacks	Victorian Premier League 2	4	Victoria	Melbourne	Promoted from Victorian State League 1
Elwood City	Victorian State League 3	7	Victoria	Melbourne	
Endeavour Hills	Victorian State League 5	9	Victoria	Melbourne	
Endeavour United	Victorian State League 4	8	Victoria	Melbourne	
Epping City	Victorian State League 3	7	Victoria	Melbourne	
Essendon Royals	Victorian Premier League 2	4	Victoria	Melbourne	
Estates	Football Queensland Premier League – Northern	5	Queensland	Townsville	
ETA Buffalo	Victorian State League 5	9	Victoria	Melbourne	
Fawkner	Victorian State League 4	8	Victoria	Melbourne	
Fernhill FC	Illawarra District League	6	New South Wales	Wollongong	
FK Beograd	National Premier Leagues South Australia	2	South Australia	Adelaide	
Floreat Athena	National Premier Leagues Western Australia	2	Western Australia	Perth	
Footscray Rangers	Victorian State League 5	9	Victoria	Melbourne	
Forrestfield United	Football West State League Division 2	4	Western Australia	Perth	
Fortuna 60	Victorian State League 5	9	Victoria	Melbourne	
Frankston Pines	Victorian State League 4	8	Victoria	Melbourne	Relegated from Victorian State League 3
Fraser Flames	Football Queensland Premier League – Wide Bay	5	Queensland	Brisbane	
Fraser Park	Football NSW League Two	4	New South Wales	Sydney	
Fremantle City	National Premier Leagues Western Australia	2	Western Australia	Perth	
Frenchville	Football Queensland Premier League – Central Coast	5	Queensland	Rockhampton	
Fulham United	State League 1 South Australia	3	South Australia	Adelaide	
Garuda FC	NorZone Premier League	3	Northern Territory	Darwin	
Gatton Redbacks	Football Queensland Premier League 3 – Darling Downs	5	Queensland	Gatton	
Gawler Eagles	State League 2 South Australia	4	South Australia	Gawler	
Geelong SC	Victorian Premier League 2	4	Victoria	Geelong	Promoted from Victorian State League 1
Geelong Rangers	Victorian State League 2	6	Victoria	Geelong	
Gerringong Breakers	Illawarra District League	6	New South Wales	Wollongong	
Ghan United	State League 2 South Australia	4	South Australia	Adelaide	
Gippsland United	Victorian State League 1	5	Victoria	Gippsland	
Gisborne	Victorian State League 5	9	Victoria	Gisborne	
Glen Waverley	Victorian State League 5	9	Victoria	Melbourne	
Glenorchy Knights	National Premier Leagues Tasmania	2	Tasmania	Hobart	
Glenroy Lions	Victorian State League 4	8	Victoria	Melbourne	
Gladesville Ryde Magic	Football NSW League Two	4	New South Wales	Sydney	
Granville	Football Queensland Premier League 3 − Wide Bay	5	Queensland	Maryborough	
Granville Rage	Football NSW League Two	4	New South Wales	Sydney	
Greater Dandenong	Victorian State League 3	7	Victoria	Melbourne	Relegated from Victorian State League 2
Green Gully	National Premier Leagues Victoria	2	Victoria	Melbourne	
Greta Branxton	Zone Football League Three	6	New South Wales	Newcastle	
Gold Coast Knights	National Premier Leagues Queensland	2	Queensland	Gold Coast	
Gold Coast United	National Premier Leagues Queensland	2	Queensland	Gold Coast	
Gosford City	Central Coast Division One	6	New South Wales	Gosford	
Gosnells City	Football West State League Division 1	3	Western Australia	Perth	
Goulburn Stags	State League Division 2	5	Australian Capital Territory	Goulburn	
Goulburn Strikers	State League Division 1	4	Australian Capital Territory	Goulburn	
Goulburn Valley Suns	Victorian Premier League 2	4	Victoria	Shepparton	
Grange Thistle	Football Queensland Premier League 2	4	Queensland	Brisbane	
Greenvale United	Victorian State League 5	9	Victoria	Melbourne	Relegated from Victorian State League 4
Gundaroo Bullocks	State League Division 3	6	Australian Capital Territory	Gundaroo	
Gungahlin United	National Premier Leagues Capital Football	2	Australian Capital Territory	Canberra	
Gwelup Croatia	Football West State League Division 1	3	Western Australia	Perth	
Gympie United	Football Queensland Premier League 3 – Sunshine Coast	5	Queensland	Gympie	
Hakoah Sydney City East	Football NSW League One	3	New South Wales	Sydney	
Hamilton Azzurri	Zone Football League One	4	New South Wales	Newcastle	
Hampton East Brighton	Victorian State League 1	5	Victoria	Melbourne	Promoted from Victorian State League 2
Hampton Park United Sparrows	Victorian State League 3	7	Victoria	Melbourne	Promoted from Victorian State League 3
Hawkesbury City	Football NSW League Two	4	New South Wales	Sydney	
Heatherton United	Victorian State League 3	7	Victoria	Melbourne	
Hellenic Athletic	NorZone Premier League	2	Northern Territory	Darwin	
Heidelberg Eagles	Victorian State League 3	7	Victoria	Melbourne	
Heidelberg Stars	Victorian State League 4	8	Victoria	Melbourne	Promoted from Victorian State League 5
Heidelberg United	National Premier Leagues Victoria	2	Victoria	Melbourne	
Helensburgh Thistle	Illawarra Premier League	5	New South Wales	Wollongong	
Highfields	Football Queensland Premier League 3 – Darling Downs	5	Queensland	Toowoomba	
Hills United	Football NSW League One	3	New South Wales	Sydney	Relegated from National Premier Leagues NSW
Hobart City Beachside	Southern Championship	3	Tasmania	Hobart	
Hobart United	Southern Championship	3	Tasmania	Hobart	
Holland Park Hawks	Football Queensland Premier League 1	3	Queensland	Brisbane	Promoted from Football Queensland Premier League 2
Hoppers Crossing	Victorian State League 3	7	Victoria	Melbourne	Relegated from Victorian State League 2
Hume City	National Premier Leagues Victoria	2	Victoria	Melbourne	
Huon Valley	Southern Social League Three	7	Tasmania	Hobart	
Hurstville	Football NSW League Two	4	New South Wales	Sydney	
Hurstville City Minotaurs	St George Premier League	6	New South Wales	Sydney	
Ingham	Football Queensland Premier League 3 − Northern	5	Queensland	Ingham	
Inglewood United	Football West State League Division 1	3	Western Australia	Perth	Relegated from National Premier Leagues Western Australia
Inner West Hawks	Football NSW League Two	4	New South Wales	Sydney	
Innisfail United	Football Queensland Premier League – Far North & Gulf	5	Queensland	Mourilyan	
Inter Lions	Football NSW League One	3	New South Wales	Sydney	
Ipswich FC	Football Queensland Premier League 1	3	Queensland	Ipswich	
Ipswich Knights	Football Queensland Premier League 3 – Metro	5	Queensland	Brisbane	Relegated from Football Queensland Premier League 2
Jimboomba United	Football Queensland Premier League 5 – Metro	7	Queensland	Logan City	
Joondalup City	Football West State League Division 1	3	Western Australia	Perth	Promoted from Football West State League Division 2
Kahibah FC	Northern League One	3	New South Wales	Lake Macquarie	
Kalamunda City	Football West State League Division 1	3	Western Australia	Perth	Promoted from Football West State League Division 2
Kangaroo Point Rovers	Football Queensland Premier League 5 – Metro	7	Queensland	Brisbane	
Kanwal FC	Central Coast Premier League	5	New South Wales	Central Coast	
Kariong United	Central Coast Division One	6	New South Wales	Central Coast	
Kawana	Football Queensland Premier League 3 – Sunshine Coast	5	Queensland	Sunshine Coast	
Kawungan Sandy Straits Jets	Football Queensland Premier League 3 − Wide Bay	5	Queensland	Hervey Bay	
Keilor Park	Victorian State League 1	5	Victoria	Melbourne	Promoted from Victorian State League 2
Keilor Wolves	Victorian State League 4	8	Victoria	Melbourne	
Keon Park	Victorian State League 4	8	Victoria	Melbourne	Promoted from Victorian State League 5
Keysborough	Victorian State League 5	8	Victoria	Melbourne	Relegated from Victorian State League 4
Killarney District	Central Coast Premier League	5	New South Wales	Central Coast	
Kincumber Roos	Central Coast Division One	6	New South Wales	Central Coast	
Kingborough Lions United	National Premier Leagues Tasmania	2	Tasmania	Hobart	
Kings Domain	Victorian State League 4	8	Victoria	Melbourne	
Kingscliff Wolves	Football Queensland Premier League 3 – South Coast	5	Queensland	Gold Coast	
Kingsley Westside	Football West State League Division 1	3	Western Australia	Perth	
Kingston City	Victorian Premier League 1	3	Victoria	Melbourne	
Knox City	Victorian State League 2	6	Victoria	Melbourne	
Knox United	Victorian State League 4	8	Victoria	Melbourne	
Kotara South	Zone Football League One	4	New South Wales	Newcastle	
Kurri Kurri	Zone Football League Three	6	New South Wales	Newcastle	
La Trobe University	Victorian State League 5	9	Victoria	Melbourne	
Lake Macquarie City	Northern League One	3	New South Wales	Lake Macquarie	Relegated from National Premier Leagues Northern NSW
Lalor United	Victorian State League 2	6	Victoria	Melbourne	
Lambton Jaffas	National Premier Leagues Northern NSW	2	New South Wales	Newcastle	
Langwarrin	Victorian Premier League 1	3	Victoria	Melbourne	
Lanyon United	Capital League Division 6	9	Australian Capital Territory	Canberra	
Lara United	Victorian State League 4	8	Victoria	Geelong	Promoted from Victorian State League 5
Launceston City	National Premier Leagues Tasmania	2	Tasmania	Launceston	
Launceston United	National Premier Leagues Tasmania	2	Tasmania	Launceston	
Laverton	Victorian State League 3	7	Victoria	Melbourne	
Legends	Football Queensland Premier League 4 – South Coast	6	Queensland	Gold Coast	
Leichhardt Lions	Football Queensland Premier League – Far North & Gulf	5	Queensland	Cairns	
Lilydale Montrosse United	Victorian State League 5	9	Victoria	Melbourne	
Lions FC	National Premier Leagues Queensland	2	Queensland	Brisbane	
Logan Lightning	Football Queensland Premier League 1	3	Queensland	Brisbane	
Logan Metro	Football Queensland Premier League 4 – Metro	6	Queensland	Logan City	
Logan Roos	Football Queensland Premier League 4 – Metro	6	Queensland	Logan City	Promoted from Football Queensland Premier League 5 – Metro
Logan Village Falcons	Football Queensland Premier League 5 – Metro	7	Queensland	Logan City	
Lyndale United	Victorian State League 4	8	Victoria	Melbourne	
MA Olympic	Football Queensland Premier League – Northern	5	Queensland	Townsville	
Macarthur FC	A-League Men	1	New South Wales	Sydney	
Macarthur Rams	Football NSW League One	3	New South Wales	Sydney	
Mackay & Whitsundays Magpies Crusaders United	Football Queensland Premier League 1	3	Queensland	Mackay	
Mackay Lions	Football Queensland Premier League – Whitsunday Coast	5	Queensland	Mackay	
Mackay Rangers	Football Queensland Premier League – Whitsunday Coast	5	Queensland	Mackay	
Mackay Wanderers	Football Queensland Premier League – Whitsunday Coast	5	Queensland	Mackay	
Macquarie United	Western Premier League	5	New South Wales	Dubbo	
Magic United	Football Queensland Premier League 1	3	Queensland	Gold Coast	Promoted from Football Queensland Premier League 2
Magpies FC	Football Queensland Premier League – Whitsunday Coast	5	Queensland	Whitsundays	
Maidstone United	Victorian State League 5	9	Victoria	Melbourne	
Maitland	National Premier Leagues Northern NSW	2	New South Wales	Maitland	
Majura	Capital League Division 1	4	Australian Capital Territory	Canberra	
Malvern City	Victorian State League 1	5	Victoria	Melbourne	
Mandurah City	Football West State League Division 1	3	Western Australia	Mandurah	
Manningham Juventus	Victorian State League 4	8	Victoria	Melbourne	
Manningham United	Victorian Premier League 1	3	Victoria	Melbourne	Relegated from National Premier Leagues Victoria
Manly United	National Premier Leagues NSW	2	New South Wales	Sydney	
Marconi Stallions	National Premier Leagues NSW	2	New South Wales	Sydney	
Mareeba United	Football Queensland Premier League – Far North & Gulf	5	Queensland	Mareeba	
Marlin Coast Rangers	Football Queensland Premier League – Far North & Gulf	5	Queensland	Cairns	
Maroochydore FC	Football Queensland Premier League 2	4	Queensland	Brisbane	
Mayfield United	Zone Football League Two	5	New South Wales	Newcastle	
Mazenod United	Victorian State League 1	5	Victoria	Melbourne	
Meadow Park	Victorian State League 5	9	Victoria	Melbourne	
Melbourne City	A-League Men	1	Victoria	Melbourne	
Melbourne City	Victorian State League 4	8	Victoria	Melbourne	
Medowie FC	Zone Football League Three	6	New South Wales	Newcastle	
Melbourne Knights	National Premier Leagues Victoria	2	Victoria	Melbourne	
Melbourne Srbija	Victorian Premier League 1	3	Victoria	Melbourne	Promoted from Victorian Premier League 2
Melbourne Victory	A-League Men	1	Victoria	Melbourne	
Melbourne University	Victorian State League 4	8	Victoria	Melbourne	
Melton Phoenix	Victorian State League 4	8	Victoria	Melbourne	
Murdoch University Melville	Football West State League Division 1	3	Western Australia	Perth	
Mentone	Victorian State League 4	8	Victoria	Melbourne	
Metro	Southern Social League	5	Tasmania	Hobart	
Merewether Advance	Zone Football League Two	5	New South Wales	Newcastle	
Merewether United	Zone Football League Three	6	New South Wales	Newcastle	
Middle Park	Victorian State League 3	7	Victoria	Melbourne	
Mill Park	Victorian State League 2	6	Victoria	Melbourne	
Mindil Aces	NorZone Premier League	2	Northern Territory	Darwin	
Minmi Wanderers	Zone Football League Two	5	New South Wales	Newcastle	Relegated from Zone Football League One
Mitchell Rangers	Victorian State League 5	9	Victoria	Broadford	
Mitchelton	Football Queensland Premier League 2	4	Queensland	Brisbane	Relegated from Football Queensland Premier League 1
Modbury Jets	National Premier Leagues South Australia	2	South Australia	Adelaide	
Modbury Vista	State League 2 South Australia	4	South Australia	Adelaide	
Moggill FC	Football Queensland Premier League 4 – Metro	6	Queensland	Brisbane	
Monaro Panthers	National Premier Leagues Capital Football	2	Australian Capital Territory	Queanbeyan	
Monash City	Victorian State League 4	8	Victoria	Melbourne	
Monash University	Victorian State League 4	8	Victoria	Melbourne	
Monbulk Rangers	Victorian State League 4	8	Victoria	Melbourne	
Moonee Ponds United	Victorian State League 4	8	Victoria	Melbourne	
Moonee Valley Knights	Victorian State League 4	8	Victoria	Melbourne	
Mooroolbark	Victorian State League 2	6	Victoria	Melbourne	
Mooroondu	Football Queensland Premier League 6 – Metro	8	Queensland	Redland City	
Moreland City	Victorian Premier League 1	3	Victoria	Melbourne	Relegated from National Premier Leagues Victoria
Moreland City	Victorian State League 5	9	Victoria	Melbourne	
Moreland United	Victorian State League 4	8	Victoria	Melbourne	
Moreton City Excelsior	National Premier Leagues Queensland	2	Queensland	Brisbane	
Mornington	Victorian State League 1	5	Victoria	Melbourne	
Mount Barker United	State League 2 South Australia	4	South Australia	Mount Barker	
Mount Eliza	Victorian State League 5	9	Victoria	Melbourne	
Mount Martha	Victorian State League 5	9	Victoria	Melbourne	
Mount Waverley City	Victorian State League 4	8	Victoria	Melbourne	Promoted from Victorian State League 5
Mounties Wanderers	Football NSW League One	3	New South Wales	Sydney	Promoted from Football NSW League Two
Mt Druitt Town Rangers	National Premier Leagues NSW	2	New South Wales	Sydney	Promoted from Football NSW League One
Mt Gravatt Hawks	Football Queensland Premier League 3 – Metro	5	Queensland	Brisbane	
Mudgeeraba	Football Queensland Premier League 3 – South Coast	5	Queensland	Gold Coast	Promoted from Football Queensland Premier League 4 – South Coast
Murwillumbah	Football Queensland Premier League 4 – South Coast	6	New South Wales (Note: Team based in New South Wales but playing in Queensland competition.)	Murwillumbah	
Musgrave	Football Queensland Premier League 3 – South Coast	5	Queensland	Gold Coast	
Nambour Yandina United	Football Queensland Premier League 3 – Sunshine Coast	5	Queensland	Sunshine Coast	
Narangba Eagles	Football Queensland Premier League 4 – Metro	6	Queensland	Brisbane	Promoted from Football Queensland Premier League 5 – Metro
Narrabundah FC	Capital League Division 3	6	Australian Capital Territory	Canberra	
Nelson Bay	Zone Football League Two	5	New South Wales	Newcastle	
Nelson Eastern Suburbs	Southern Social League	5	Tasmania	Hobart	
Nepean	Football NSW League Two	4	New South Wales	Sydney	Relegated from Football NSW League One
Nerang Eagles	Football Queensland Premier League 4 – South Coast	6	Queensland	Gold Coast	
Nerimbera	Football Queensland Premier League – Central Coast	5	Queensland	Rockhampton	
New Farm United	Football Queensland Premier League 4 – Metro	6	Queensland	Brisbane	
New Lambton	National Premier Leagues Northern NSW	2	New South Wales	Newcastle	
New Norfolk	Southern Social League Two	6	Tasmania	New Norfolk	
New Town Eagles	Southern Championship	3	Tasmania	Hobart	
Newcastle Croatia	Zone Football League One	4	New South Wales	Newcastle	Promoted from Zone Football League Two
Newcastle Jets	A-League Men	1	New South Wales	Newcastle	
Newcastle Olympic	National Premier Leagues Northern NSW	2	New South Wales	Newcastle	
Newcastle Suns	Zone Football League One	4	New South Wales	Newcastle	
Newmarket	Football Queensland Premier League 3 – Metro	5	Queensland	Brisbane	
Newport Storm	Victorian State League 5	9	Victoria	Melbourne	
Noarlunga United	State League 2 South Australia	4	South Australia	Adelaide	
Noble Hurricanes	Victorian State League 4	8	Victoria	Melbourne	Promoted from Victorian State League 5
Noble Park United	Victorian State League 2	6	Victoria	Melbourne	Promoted from Victorian State League 3
Noble Suns	Victorian State League 5	9	Victoria	Melbourne	
Noosa Lions	Football Queensland Premier League 3 – Sunshine Coast	5	Queensland	Sunshine Coast	
North Brisbane	Football Queensland Premier League 3 – Metro	5	Queensland	Brisbane	
North Caulfield Maccaba	Victorian State League 2	6	Victoria	Melbourne	
North Eastern MetroStars	National Premier Leagues South Australia	2	South Australia	Adelaide	
North Geelong Warriors	Victorian Premier League 2	4	Victoria	Geelong	Relegated from Victorian State League 1
North Lakes United	Football Queensland Premier League 2	4	Queensland	Brisbane	
North Launceston Eagles	Northern Social League	5	Tasmania	Launceston	
North Pine United	Football Queensland Premier League 3 – Metro	5	Queensland	Brisbane	
North Shore Mariners	National Premier Leagues NSW	2	New South Wales	Sydney	
North Star	Football Queensland Premier League 2	4	Queensland	Brisbane	
North Sunshine Eagles	Victorian Premier League 1	3	Victoria	Melbourne	Promoted from Victorian Premier League 2
North United	Zone Football League Two	5	New South Wales	Newcastle	
North West Sydney Spirit	National Premier Leagues NSW	2	New South Wales	Sydney	
Northcote City	Victorian Premier League 1	3	Victoria	Melbourne	
Northern Demons	State League 2 South Australia	4	South Australia	Port Pirie	
Northern Rangers	Northern Championship	3	Tasmania	Launceston	
Northern Tigers	Football NSW League One	3	New South Wales	Sydney	
Nunawading City	Victorian Premier League 2	4	Victoria	Melbourne	
O'Connor Knights	National Premier Leagues Capital Football	2	Australian Capital Territory	Canberra	
Oak Flats Falcons	Illawarra District League	6	New South Wales	City of Shellharbour	
Oakleigh Cannons	National Premier Leagues Victoria	2	Victoria	Melbourne	
Ocean Grove	Victorian State League 5	9	Victoria	Melbourne	
Old Bridge Salisbury	Football Queensland Premier League 5 – Metro	7	Queensland	Brisbane	
Old Ivanhoe	Victorian State League 5	9	Victoria	Melbourne	
Old Melburnians	Victorian State League 5	9	Victoria	Melbourne	
Old Scotch	Victorian State League 1	5	Victoria	Melbourne	
Old Trinity Grammarians	Victorian State League 5	9	Victoria	Melbourne	
Olympia FC Warriors	Southern Championship	3	Tasmania	Hobart	
Olympic FC	National Premier Leagues Queensland	2	Queensland	Brisbane	
Olympic Kingsway	National Premier Leagues Western Australia	2	Western Australia	Perth	
Orana Spurs	Western Premier League	5	New South Wales	Dubbo	
Orange Waratah	Western Premier League	5	New South Wales	Orange	
Ormeau	Football Queensland Premier League 3 – South Coast	5	Queensland	Gold Coast	
Ourimbah United	Central Coast Division One	6	New South Wales	Ourimbah	
Oxley United	Football Queensland Premier League 6 – Metro	8	Queensland	Brisbane	Relegated from Football Queensland Premier League 5 – Metro
Pacific Pines	Football Queensland Premier League 4 – South Coast	6	Queensland	Gold Coast	
Pakenham United	Victorian State League 5	9	Victoria	Melbourne	
Palerang United	State League Division 6	9	Australian Capital Territory	Braidwood	
Palm Beach	Football Queensland Premier League 3 – South Coast	5	Queensland	Gold Coast	
Panorama FC	Western Premier League	5	New South Wales	Bathurst	
Para Hills Knights	National Premier Leagues South Australia	2	South Australia	Adelaide	
Park Ridge Panthers	Football Queensland Premier League 6 – Metro	8	Queensland	Logan City	
Parkes Cobras	Western Premier League	5	New South Wales	Parkes	
Parramatta	Football NSW League Two	4	New South Wales	Sydney	
Pascoe Vale	Victorian Premier League 2	4	Victoria	Melbourne	
Peninsula Power	National Premier Leagues Queensland	2	Queensland	Brisbane	
Peninsula Strikers	Victorian State League 2	6	Victoria	Melbourne	
Perth	National Premier Leagues Western Australia	2	Western Australia	Perth	
Perth Glory	A-League Men	1	Western Australia	Perth	
Perth RedStar	National Premier Leagues Western Australia	2	Western Australia	Perth	
Phoenix Rivers	Southern Social League	5	Tasmania	Hobart	
Picton Rangers	Illawarra District League	6	New South Wales	Wollongong	
Pimpama City	Football Queensland Premier League 4 – South Coast	6	Queensland	Gold Coast	
Pine Hills	Football Queensland Premier League 2	4	Queensland	Brisbane	
Pine Rivers United	Football Queensland Premier League 5 – Metro	7	Queensland	Brisbane	
Playford City Patriots	National Premier Leagues South Australia	2	South Australia	Adelaide	Promoted from State League 1 South Australia
Plenty Valley Lions	Victorian State League 3	7	Victoria	Melbourne	Promoted from Victorian State League 4
Point Cook	Victorian State League 4	8	Victoria	Melbourne	Relegated from Victorian State League 3
Pontian Eagles	State League 1 South Australia	3	South Australia	Adelaide	Promoted from State League 2 South Australia
Port Adelaide Pirates	State League 2 South Australia	4	South Australia	Adelaide	
Port Darwin	NorZone Premier League	2	Northern Territory	Darwin	
Port Kembla	Illawarra Premier League	5	New South Wales	Wollongong	
Port Melbourne	National Premier Leagues Victoria	2	Victoria	Melbourne	
Preston Lions	National Premier Leagues Victoria	2	Victoria	Melbourne	Promoted from Victorian Premier League 1
Prospect United	Football NSW League Two	4	New South Wales	Sydney	
Queanbeyan City	National Premier Leagues Capital Football	2	Australian Capital Territory	Queanbeyan	Promoted from Capital Premier League
Quinns	Football West State League Division 2	4	Western Australia	Perth	
QUT FC	Football Queensland Premier League 6 – Metro	8	Queensland	Brisbane	
Rebels	Football Queensland Premier League – Northern	5	Queensland	Townsville	
Redcliffe Dolphins	Football Queensland Premier League 3 – Metro	5	Queensland	Brisbane	
Redlands United	Football Queensland Premier League 1	3	Queensland	Brisbane	Relegated from National Premier Leagues Queensland
Redlynch Strikers United	Football Queensland Premier League – Far North & Gulf	5	Queensland	Cairns	
Ridge Hills	Football Queensland Premier League 6 – Metro	8	Queensland	Brisbane	Relegated from Football Queensland Premier League 5 – Metro
Ringwood City	Victorian State League 4	8	Victoria	Melbourne	
Ripley Valley	Football Queensland Premier League 4 – Metro	6	Queensland	Ipswich	
Riverina Rhinos	National Premier Leagues Capital Football	2	Australian Capital Territory	Griffith	
Riversdale	Victorian State League 4	8	Victoria	Melbourne	
Riverside Olympic	National Premier Leagues Tasmania	2	Tasmania	Launceston	
Riverway JCU	Football Queensland Premier League – Northern	5	Queensland	Townsville	
Robina City	Football Queensland Premier League 2	4	Queensland	Gold Coast	Promoted from Football Queensland Premier League 3 – South Coast
Rochedale Rovers	Football Queensland Premier League 1	3	Queensland	Brisbane	Relegated from National Premier Leagues Queensland
Rockdale Ilinden	National Premier Leagues NSW	2	New South Wales	Sydney	
Rockingham City	Football West State League Division 2	4	Western Australia	Perth	Relegated from Football West State League Division 1
Rockville Rovers	Football Queensland Premier League 3 – Darling Downs	5	Queensland	Toowoomba	
Rosebud SC	Victorian State League 4	8	Victoria	Melbourne	Promoted from Victorian State League 5
Rowville Eagles	Victorian State League 3	7	Victoria	Melbourne	
Roxburgh Park United	Victorian State League 5	9	Victoria	Melbourne	
Runaway Bay	Football Queensland Premier League 3 – South Coast	5	Queensland	Gold Coast	
Rutherford	Zone Football League Three	6	New South Wales	Newcastle	
Rydalmere Lions	Football NSW League One	3	New South Wales	Sydney	
Saints Eagles South	Football Queensland Premier League – Northern	5	Queensland	Townsville	
Salisbury Inter	State League 2 South Australia	4	South Australia	Adelaide	
Salisbury United	State League 1 South Australia	3	South Australia	Adelaide	
Samford Rangers	Football Queensland Premier League 2	4	Queenslnand	Brisbane	
Sandown Lions	Victorian State League 4	8	Victoria	Melbourne	
Sandringham	Victorian State League 3	7	Victoria	Melbourne	
SC Corinthians	Football Queensland Premier League – Wide Bay	5	Queensland	Bundaberg	
Seaford Rangers	State League 2 South Australia	4	South Australia	Adelaide	
Seaford United	Victorian State League 5	9	Victoria	Melbourne	
Sebastopol Vikings	Victorian State League 3	7	Victoria	Ballarat	
Shellharbour FC	Illawarra Premier League	5	New South Wales	Wollongong	
Shoalhaven FC	Illawarra District League	6	New South Wales	Wollongong	
Singleton Strikers	Northern League One	3	New South Wales	Singleton	
Skye United	Victorian State League 2	6	Victoria	Melbourne	
Slacks Creek	Football Queensland Premier League 5 – Metro	7	Queensland	Brisbane	Promoted from Football Queensland Premier League 6 – Metro
Somerset FC	Northern Championship	3	Tasmania	Burnie	
Somerville Eagles	Victorian State League 4	8	Victoria	Somerville	
South Coast Flame	Football NSW League Two	4	New South Wales	Wollongong	
South Coast United	Illawarra Premier League	5	New South Wales	Wollongong	
Sorrento	National Premier Leagues Western Australia	2	Western Australia	Perth	Promoted from Football West State League Division 1
South Adelaide Panthers	State League 1 South Australia	3	South Australia	Adelaide	Relegated from National Premier Leagues Queensland
South Cardiff	Northern League One	3	New South Wales	Lake Macquarie	
South East United	Southern Championship	3	Tasmania	Sorell	
South Hobart	National Premier Leagues Tasmania	2	Tasmania	Hobart	
South Maitland	Zone Football League Two	5	New South Wales	Newcastle	
South Melbourne	National Premier Leagues Victoria	2	Victoria	Melbourne	
South Springvale	Victorian State League 1	5	Victoria	Melbourne	
South West Queensland Thunder	Football Queensland Premier League 1	3	Queensland	Toowoomba	
SD Raiders	Football NSW League One	3	New South Wales	Sydney	
Southern and Ettalong United	Central Coast Premier League	5	New South Wales	Central Coast	
Southern FC	Southern Social League Three	7	Tasmania	Hobart	
Southern Lakes United	Zone Football League Three	6	New South Wales	Newcastle	
Southern United	Zone Football League Two	5	New South Wales	Newcastle	
Southport Warriors	Football Queensland Premier League 3 – South Coast	5	Queensland	Gold Coast	
Souths United	Football Queensland Premier League 2	4	Queensland	Brisbane	
Southside Comets	Football Queensland Premier League – Far North & Gulf	5	Queensland	Cairns	
Southside Eagles	Football Queensland Premier League 1	3	Queensland	Brisbane	
Southside United	Football Queensland Premier League 3 − Central Coast	5	Queensland	Rockhampton	
Spring Hills	Victorian State League 5	9	Victoria	Melbourne	
Springfield United	Football Queensland Premier League 3 – Metro	5	Queensland	Ipswich	
Springvale City	Victorian State League 4	8	Victoria	Melbourne	
Springvale White Eagles	Victorian Premier League 2	4	Victoria	Melbourne	Promoted from Victorian State League 1
St Albans	Football Queensland Premier League 3 – Darling Downs	5	Queensland	Toowoomba	
St Albans Saints	National Premier Leagues Victoria	2	Victoria	Melbourne	
St George	National Premier Leagues NSW	2	New South Wales	Sydney	
St George City	National Premier Leagues NSW	2	New South Wales	Sydney	
St George Willawong	National Premier Leagues Queensland	2	Queensland	Brisbane	Promoted from Football Queensland Premier League
St Kevins Old Boys	Victorian State League 5	9	Victoria	Melbourne	
St Kilda	Victorian State League 2	6	Victoria	Melbourne	Promoted from Victorian State League 3
Stanmore Hawks	NSW League Two	4	New South Wales	Sydney	
Stirling Macedonia	National Premier Leagues Western Australia	2	Western Australia	Perth	
Stockton Sharks	Zone Football League One	4	New South Wales	Newcastle	Promoted from Zone Football League Two
Strathmore	Victorian State League 2	6	Victoria	Melbourne	Relegated from Victorian State League 1
Stratford Dolphins	Football Queensland Premier League – Far North & Gulf	5	Queensland		
Sturt Lions	State League 1 South Australia	3	South Australia	Adelaide	
Subiaco	Football West State League Division 1	3	Western Australia	Perth	
Sunbury Blues	Football Queensland Premier League – Wide Bay	5	Queensland	Maryborough	
Sunbury United	Victorian State League 3	7	Victoria	Melbourne	
Sunshine Coast	Football Queensland Premier League 1	3	Queensland	Sunshine Coast	
Sunshine Coast Wanderers	National Premier Leagues Queensland	2	Queensland	Sunshine Coast	
Surf Coast	Victorian State League 3	7	Victoria	Torquay	Promoted from Victorian State League 4
Surfers Paradise Apollo	Football Queensland Premier League 3 – South Coast	5	Queensland	Gold Coast	
Sutherland Sharks	National Premier Leagues NSW	2	New South Wales	Sydney	
Swan United	Football West State League Division 2	4	Western Australia	Perth	
Swansea	Zone Football League One	4	New South Wales	Newcastle	
Sydenham Park	Victorian State League 1	5	Victoria	Melbourne	
Sydney FC	A-League Men	1	New South Wales	Sydney	
Sydney Olympic	National Premier Leagues NSW	2	New South Wales	Sydney	
Sydney United 58	National Premier Leagues NSW	2	New South Wales	Sydney	
Sydney University	Football NSW League Two	4	New South Wales	Sydney	
Tallebudgera Valley	Football Queensland Premier League 3 − South Coast	5	Queensland	Gold Coast	
Taringa Rovers	Football Queensland Premier League 2	4	Queensland	Brisbane	
Tarneit United	Victorian State League 5	9	Victoria	Ballarat	
Taroona	Southern Championship	3	Tasmania	Hobart	
Tarragindi Tigers	Football Queensland Premier League 5 – Metro	7	Queensland	Brisbane	Relegated from Football Queensland Premier League 4 – Metro
Tarrawanna Blueys	Illawarra Premier League	5	New South Wales	Wollongong	
Templestowe Wolves	Victorian State League 5	9	Victoria	Melbourne	
Terrigal United	Central Coast Premier League	5	New South Wales	Terrigal	
Teviot Downs	Football Queensland Premier League 6 – Metro	8	Queensland	Logan City	
The Cove	State League 1 South Australia	3	South Australia	Adelaide	Promoted from State League 2 South Australia
The Entrance Bateau Bay	Central Coast Division One	6	New South Wales	The Entrance	
The Gap	Football Queensland Premier League 4 – Metro	6	Queensland	Brisbane	
The Lakes	Football Queensland Premier League 3 − Metro	5	Queensland	Brisbane	
Thirroul JFC	Illawarra District League	6	New South Wales	Wollongong	
Thornbury Athletic	Victorian State League 4	8	Victoria	Melbourne	
Thornton Redbacks	Northern League One	3	New South Wales	Maitland	
Toronto Awaba Stags	Northern League One	3	New South Wales	Lake Macquarie	
Toukley FC	Central Coast Division One	6	New South Wales	Toukley	
Townsville Warriors	Football Queensland Premier League – Northern	5	Queensland	Townsville	
Truganina Hornets	Victorian State League 5	9	Victoria	Melbourne	Relegated from Victorian State League 4
Tuggeranong United	National Premier Leagues Capital Football	2	Australian Capital Territory	Canberra	
Tweed United	Football Queensland Premier League 3 – South Coast	5	Queensland	Gold Coast	
Ulverstone	Northern Championship	3	Tasmania	Ulverstone	
Umina United	Central Coast Division One	6	New South Wales	Central Coast	
Unanderra Hearts	Illawarra District League	6	New South Wales	Wollongong	
Uni Hill Eagles	Victorian State League 2	6	Victoria	Melbourne	
United Park Eagles	Football Queensland Premier League – Wide Bay	5	Queensland	Bundaberg	
United Warriors	Football Queensland Premier League – Wide Bay	5	Queensland	Hervey Bay	
University Azzuri	NorZone Premier League	2	Northern Territory	Darwin	
University of Canberra Stars	Capital League Division 1	4	Australian Capital Territory	Canberra	
University of Newcastle	Zone Football League One	4	New South Wales	Newcastle	
University of New South Wales	Football NSW League One	3	New South Wales	Sydney	
University of Queensland	Football Queensland Premier League 3 – Metro	5	Queensland	Brisbane	
University of Tasmania	Southern Championship	3	Tasmania	Hobart	
University of Wollongong	Illawarra District League	6	New South Wales	Wollongong	
Upfield	Victorian State League 1	5	Victoria	Melbourne	
UWA Nedlands	Football West State League Division 1	3	West Australia	Perth	
Valentine	National Premier Leagues Northern NSW	2	New South Wales	Lake Macquarie	
Vipers FC	State League 1 South Australia	3	South Australia	Adelaide	
Virginia United	Football Queensland Premier League 3 – Metro	5	Queensland	Brisbane	
Wagga City Wanderers	Capital Premier League	3	Australian Capital Territory	Wagga Wagga	
Wanneroo City	Football West State League Division 2	4	Western Australia	Perth	
Warners Bay	Zone Football League One	4	New South Wales	Newcastle	
Wallsend	Northern League One	3	New South Wales	Newcastle	
Warilla Wanderers	Illawarra District League	6	South Coast	Wollongong	
Warwick District	Football Queensland Premier League 3 – Darling Downs	5	Queensland	Toowoomba	
Watsonia Heights	Victorian State League 4	8	Victoria	Melbourne	
Waverley Wanderers	Victorian State League 3	7	Victoria	Melbourne	Promoted from Victorian State League 4
Wellington Phoenix	A-League Men	1	New Zealand	Wellington	
Wembley Downs	Football West State League Division 2	4	Western Australia	Perth	
Werribee City	Victorian Premier League 2	4	Victoria	Melbourne	Relegated from Victorian State League 1
West Adelaide	State League 1 South Australia	3	South Australia	Adelaide	
West Canberra Wanderers	National Premier Leagues Capital Football	2	Australian Capital Territory	Canberra	
West Point	Victorian State League 4	8	Victoria	Melbourne	
West Preston	Victorian State League 4	8	Victoria	Melbourne	
West Torrens Birkalla	National Premier Leagues South Australia	2	South Australia	Adelaide	Promoted from State League 1 South Australia
West Wallsend	Northern League One	3	New South Wales	Newcastle	
West Wanderers	Football Queensland Premier League 3 – Darling Downs	5	Queensland	Toowoomba	
Western Eagles	Victorian State League 2	6	Victoria	Melbourne	Promoted from Victorian State League 3
Western Knights	National Premier Leagues Western Australia	2	Western Australia	Perth	
Western Pride	Football Queensland Premier League 1	3	Queensland	Brisbane	
Western Spirit	Football Queensland Premier League 4 – Metro	6	Queensland	Ipswich	Relegated from Football Queensland Premier League 3 – Metro
Western Strikers	State League 2 South Australia	4	South Australia	Adelaide	Relegated from State League 1 South Australia
Western Suburbs	Victorian State League 1	5	Victoria	Melbourne	
Western Sydney Wanderers	A-League Men	1	New South Wales	Sydney	
Western United	A-League Men	1	Victoria	Melbourne	
Westgate	Victorian State League 1	5	Victoria	Melbourne	
Westlakes Wildcats	Zone Football League One	4	New South Wales	Newcastle	
Weston Molonglo	Capital Premier League	3	Australian Capital Territory	Canberra	
Weston Bears	National Premier Leagues Northern NSW	2	New South Wales	Cessnock	
Westside Grovely	Football Queensland Premier League 5 – Metro	7	Queensland	Brisbane	
Westside Strikers Caroline Springs	Victorian State League 4	8	Victoria	Melbourne	
Westvale Olympic	Victorian State League 1	5	Victoria	Melbourne	Promoted from Victorian State League 2
White Star Dandenong	Victorian State League 3	7	Victoria	Melbourne	
Whitehorse United	Victorian State League 5	9	Victoria	Melbourne	
Whitsunday United	Football Queensland Premier League – Whitsunday Coast	5	Queensland	Whitsundays	
Whittlesea Ranges	Victorian State League 2	6	Victoria	Whittlesea	
Whittlesea United	Victorian Premier League 2	4	Victoria	Whittlesea	Promoted from Victorian State League 1
Williamstown	Victorian State League 2	6	Victoria	Melbourne	Promoted from Victorian State League 3
Willowburn FC	Football Queensland Premier League 3 – Darling Downs	5	Queensland	Toowoomba	
Woden Valley	Capital League Division 3	6	Australian Capital Territory	Canberra	
Wollongong Wolves	National Premier Leagues NSW	2	New South Wales	Wollongong	
Wollongong Olympic	Illawarra Premier League	5	New South Wales	Wollongong	
Wollongong United	Illawarra Premier League	5	New South Wales	Wollongong	
Woombye Snakes	Football Queensland Premier League 3 – Sunshine Coast	5	Queensland	Sunshine Coast	
Woongarrah FC	Central Coast Premier League	5	New South Wales	Central Coast	
Woonona Sharks	Illawarra Premier League	5	New South Wales	Wollongong	
Woy Woy	Central Coast Premier League	5	New South Wales	Woy Woy	
Wyndham FC	Victorian State League 5	9	Victoria	Melbourne	
Wynnum Wolves	National Premier Leagues Queensland	2	Queensland	Brisbane	
Wyoming FC	Central Coast Division One	6	New South Wales	Central Coast	
Wyong FC	Central Coast Division One	6	New South Wales	Wyong	
Yarabi FC	Capital League Division 3	6	Australian Capital Territory	Canberra	
Yarra Jets	Victorian State League 4	8	Victoria	Melbourne	
Yarraville	Victorian State League 1	5	Victoria	Melbourne	
Yass FC	Capital League Division 4	7	New South Wales	Yass	
Yeronga Eagles	Football Queensland Premier League 3 – Metro	5	Queensland	Brisbane	Relegated from Football Queensland Premier League 4 – Metro
Yoogali	National Premier Leagues Capital Football	2	Australian Capital Territory	City of Griffith	

== See also ==
- Australian Institute of Sport Football Program
- Soccer in Australia
- List of soccer clubs in Christmas Island
- List of soccer clubs in the Cocos (Keeling) Islands
- List of soccer clubs in Norfolk Island
- List of Australian rules football clubs in Australia
- List of baseball teams in Australia
- List of basketball clubs in Australia
- List of cricket clubs in Australia
- List of rowing clubs in Australia
- List of rugby league clubs in Australia
- List of rugby union clubs in Australia
- List of yacht clubs in Australia
