= 2013 Football Federation Tasmania season =

Football Federation Tasmania
- Season: 2013
- Champions: South Hobart

The Football Federation Tasmania 2013 season was the first season under the new competition format in Tasmania. The competition consists of three major divisions across the State of Tasmania, created from the teams in the previous structure. The overall premier for the new structure qualified for the National Premier Leagues finals series, competing with the other state federation champions in a final knockout tournament to decide the National Premier Leagues Champion for 2013.

== Men's Competitions ==
=== 2013 NPL Tasmania ===
Victory League
- Season: 2013
- Champions: South Hobart
- Premiers: South Hobart
- Matches: 84
- Goals: 403 (4.8 per match)
- Top goalscorer: Brayden Mann (26 goals)
- Biggest home win: Hobart Zebras 10–0 Launceston City (21 April 2013)
- Biggest away win: Launceston City 0-11 South Hobart (12 May 2013)
- Highest scoring: Launceston City 0-11 South Hobart (12 May 2013)

The 2013 T-League season was played over 22 rounds, from March to August 2013.

Pos	Team	Pld	W	D	L	GF	GA	GD	Pts	Qualification or relegation
1	South Hobart (C)	21	18	2	1	79	25	+54	56	2013 National Premier Leagues Finals
2	Devonport City	21	13	2	6	68	38	+30	41	2013 Tasmania Finals
3	Hobart Zebras	21	11	6	4	68	41	+27	39	2013 Tasmania Finals
4	Olympia	21	10	4	7	51	35	+16	34	2013 Tasmania Finals
5	Northern Rangers	21	7	6	8	56	39	+17	27	
6	Kingborough Lions United	21	6	5	10	38	54	−16	23	
7	Glenorchy Knights	21	4	4	13	30	56	−26	16	
8	Launceston City	21	0	1	20	13	115	−102	1	

Source: sportingpulse.com
Rules for classification: 1) points; 2) goal difference; 3) number of goals scored.
(C) Champions

==== Finals ====
Semifinals
1	South Hobart	2
4	Olympia	0
2	Devonport City	4
3	Hobart Zebras	2

Grand final
1	South Hobart	3
2	Devonport City	1
Third place
3	Hobart Zebras	2
4	Olympia	3

=== 2013 Tasmanian Premier Leagues ===
==== 2013 Northern Premier League ====
Northern Premier League
- Season: 2013
- Champions: Somerset
- Matches: 72
- Goals: 353 (4.9 per match)
- Top goalscorer: Kyrone Johnson (20 goals)
- Biggest home win: Somerset 8–0 Burnie United (27 April 2013); Ulverstone 11–3 Devonport City (3 August 2013)
- Biggest away win: Launceston United 0–9 Somerset (13 April 2013)
- Highest scoring: Ulverstone 11–3 Devonport City (3 August 2013)

The 2013 Northern Premier League was the first edition of the new Northern Premier League as the second level domestic association football competition in Tasmania (third level overall in Australia). 9 teams competed, all playing each other twice for a total of 16 matches. No teams were promoted or relegated this season.

Pos	Team	Pld	W	D	L	GF	GA	GD	Pts	Qualification or relegation
1	Somerset (C)	16	14	1	1	82	17	+65	43	2013 Northern Premier League Finals
2	Ulverstone	16	11	1	4	52	29	+23	34	2013 Northern Premier League Finals
3	Devonport City B	16	10	1	5	55	39	+16	31	2013 Northern Premier League Finals
4	Prospect Knights	16	8	2	6	34	30	+4	26	2013 Northern Premier League Finals
5	Northern Rangers B	16	8	1	7	31	35	−4	25	
6	Riverside Olympic	16	5	3	8	37	37	0	18	
7	Burnie United	16	5	2	9	27	45	−18	17	
8	Launceston City B	16	4	3	9	27	50	−23	15	
9	Launceston United	16	0	0	16	8	71	−63	0	

(C) Champions

===== Finals =====
Semi-finals
1	Somerset	6
4	Prospect Knights	2
2	Ulverstone	7
3	Devonport City	2

Final
1	Somerset	3
2	Ulverstone	2

==== 2013 Southern Premier League ====
Southern Premier League
- Season: 2013
- Champions: South Hobart B
- Matches: 132
- Goals: 703 (5.33 per match)
- Top goalscorer: Ethan Engels (29 goals)
- Biggest home win: Hobart Zebras B 15–3 New Town Eagles (24 August 2013)
- Biggest away win: Glenorchy Knights B 0–10 Taroona (23 August 2013)
- Highest scoring: Hobart Zebras B 15–3 New Town Eagles (24 August 2013)

The 2013 Southern Premier League was the first edition of the new Southern Premier League as the second level domestic association football competition in Tasmania (third level overall in Australia). 12 teams competed, all playing each other twice for a total of 22 rounds. No teams were promoted or relegated this season.

Pos	Team	Pld	W	D	L	GF	GA	GD	Pts	Qualification or relegation
1	Beachside	22	18	1	3	77	21	+56	55	2013 Southern Premier League Finals
2	Taroona	22	16	4	2	84	40	+44	52	2013 Southern Premier League Finals
3	Hobart Zebras B	22	12	4	6	85	49	+36	40	2013 Southern Premier League Finals
4	South Hobart B (C)	22	12	4	6	73	42	+31	40	2013 Southern Premier League Finals
5	NTC	22	13	0	9	52	39	+13	39	Withdrew at end of season
6	Olympia B	22	11	3	8	71	53	+18	36	Withdrew at end of season
7	University of Tasmania	22	8	4	10	64	55	+9	28	
8	Clarence United	22	7	4	11	60	64	−4	25	
9	Nelson Eastern Suburbs	22	5	4	13	28	54	−26	19	
10	Kingborough Lions United B	22	5	4	13	34	81	−47	19	Withdrew at end of season
11	Glenorchy Knights B	22	4	1	17	33	100	−67	13	Withdrew at end of season
12	New Town Eagles	22	3	3	16	42	105	−63	12	

(C) Champions

At the completion of the finals series, Hobart Zebras B, South Hobart B, NTC, Kingborough Lions and Glenorchy Knights B withdrew.

===== Finals =====
Semi-finals
1	Beachside	1
4	South Hobart B	3
2	Taroona	6
3	Hobart Zebras	4

Final
2	Taroona	1
4	South Hobart B	4

=== 2013 Tasmanian League One ===
==== 2013 Northern League One ====
Northern League One
- Season: 2013
- Matches: 72
- Goals: 382 (5.31 per match)

The 2013 Northern League One was the first edition of the new Tasmanian League One as the third level domestic association football competition in Tasmania (fourth level overall in Australia). 9 teams competed, all playing each other twice for a total of 16 matches. No teams were promoted or relegated this season.

Pos	Team	Pld	W	D	L	GF	GA	GD	Pts
1	Devonport City C (C)	16	13	0	3	67	30	+37	39
2	Launceston City C	16	12	2	2	48	14	+34	38
3	Northern Rangers C	16	12	1	3	67	21	+46	37
4	Riverside Olympic B	16	8	1	7	42	41	+1	25
5	Burnie United B	16	4	3	9	36	60	−24	15
6	Ulverstone B	16	4	2	10	36	56	−20	14
7	Prospect Knights B	16	3	4	9	32	49	−17	13
8	Launceston United B	16	3	4	9	27	57	−30	13
9	Somerset B	16	3	3	10	27	54	−27	12

(C) Champions

==== 2013 Southern League One ====
Southern League One
- Season: 2013
- Matches: 90
- Goals: 522 (5.8 per match)

The 2013 Southern League One was the first edition of the new Tasmanian League One as the third level domestic association football competition in Tasmania (fourth level overall in Australia). 10 teams competed, all playing each other twice for a total of 18 matches. No teams were promoted or relegated this season.

Pos	Team	Pld	W	D	L	GF	GA	GD	Pts	Qualification or relegation
1	Southern FC (C)	18	12	2	4	79	36	+43	38	
2	Beachside B	18	12	2	4	60	36	+24	38	Withdrew at end of season
3	Metro	18	11	4	3	63	43	+20	37	
4	Kingborough Lions United C	18	9	5	4	57	38	+19	32	
5	Hobart United	18	9	4	5	66	45	+21	31	
6	Taroona B	18	8	1	9	46	45	+1	25	Withdrew at end of season
7	Derwent United	18	7	2	9	53	69	−16	23	Withdrew at end of season
8	Hobart Zebras C	18	4	3	11	47	77	−30	15	Withdrew at end of season
9	Olympia C	18	3	3	12	35	69	−34	12	
10	New Town Eagles B	18	1	2	15	16	64	−48	5	Withdrew at end of season

(C) Champions

=== 2013 Tasmanian League Two ===
==== 2013 Northern League Two ====
Northern League Two
- Season: 2013
- Matches: 60
- Goals: 355 (5.92 per match)

The 2013 Northern League Two was the first edition of the new Tasmanian League Two as the fourth level domestic association football competition in Tasmania (fifth level overall in Australia). 6 teams competed, all playing each other four times for a total of 20 matches. No teams were promoted or relegated this season.

Pos	Team	Pld	W	D	L	GF	GA	GD	Pts
1	Launceston City D (C)	20	12	7	1	81	29	+52	43
2	Devonport City D	20	10	7	3	89	38	+51	37
3	Riverside Olympic C	20	10	6	4	81	40	+41	36
4	Northern Rangers D	20	4	5	11	33	65	−32	17
5	Launceston United C	20	5	2	13	41	110	−69	17
6	Launceston City X Factor	20	2	7	11	30	73	−43	13

(C) Champions

==== 2013 Southern League Two ====
Southern League Two
- Season: 2013
- Matches: 60
- Goals: 338 (5.63 per match)

The 2013 Southern League Two was the first edition of the new Tasmanian League Two as the fourth level domestic association football competition in Tasmania (fifth level overall in Australia). 6 teams competed, all playing each other four times for a total of 20 matches. No teams were promoted or relegated this season.

Pos	Team	Pld	W	D	L	GF	GA	GD	Pts
1	Olympia D (C)	20	14	3	3	110	32	+78	45
2	South Hobart C	20	14	2	4	70	29	+41	44
3	University of Tasmania B	20	11	4	5	58	46	+12	37
4	Metro B	20	7	3	10	48	54	−6	24
5	Southern FC B	20	4	1	15	28	117	−89	13
6	Hobart United B	20	2	3	15	24	60	−36	9

(C) Champions

=== 2013 Tasmanian League Three ===
==== 2013 Southern League Three ====
Southern League Three
- Season: 2013
- Matches: 90
- Goals: 424 (4.71 per match)

The 2013 Southern League Three was the first edition of the new Tasmanian League Three as the fifth level domestic association football competition in Tasmania (sixth level overall in Australia). 10 teams competed, all playing each other twice for a total of 18 matches. No teams were promoted or relegated this season.

Pos	Team	Pld	W	D	L	GF	GA	GD	Pts	Qualification or relegation
1	Glenorchy Knights C (C)	18	16	0	2	76	24	+52	48	
2	Taroona C	18	14	3	1	68	14	+54	45	
3	Beachside C	18	11	3	4	41	16	+25	36	
4	New Town Eagles B	18	10	2	6	36	33	+3	32	
5	University of Tasmania C	18	9	2	7	43	32	+11	29	
6	Clarence United B	18	9	1	8	47	37	+10	28	
7	Nelson Eastern Suburbs B	18	6	1	11	33	53	−20	19	
8	Huon Valley (R)	18	3	2	13	31	63	−32	11	Relegated to the 2014 Southern League Four
9	Kingborough Lions United D	18	3	2	13	28	69	−41	11	
10	Woodbridge	18	0	2	16	21	83	−62	2	Withdrew at end of season

(C) Champions; (R) Relegated

=== 2013 Tasmanian League Four ===
==== 2013 Southern League Four ====
Southern League Four
- Season: 2013
- Matches: 90
- Goals: 494 (5.49 per match)

The 2013 Southern League Four was the first edition of the new Tasmanian League Four as the sixth level domestic association football competition in Tasmania (seventh level overall in Australia). 10 teams competed, all playing each other twice for a total of 18 matches. No teams were promoted or relegated this season.

Pos	Team	Pld	W	D	L	GF	GA	GD	Pts	Qualification or relegation
1	Phoenix Rovers (P)	18	15	2	1	88	18	+70	47	Promoted to the 2014 Southern League Three
2	Derwent United B	18	15	1	2	57	21	+36	46	
3	University Bohemians	18	12	3	3	97	24	+73	39	
4	Barnstoneworth	18	10	3	5	51	36	+15	33	
5	Peninsula Pirates	18	8	1	9	52	56	−4	25	
6	Metro C	18	6	2	10	38	67	−29	20	
7	South Hobart D	18	5	3	10	34	56	−22	18	
8	DOSA SC	18	4	2	12	32	68	−36	14	
9	University Wanderers	18	3	2	13	21	65	−44	11	
10	University Celtics	18	2	1	15	24	83	−59	7	

(P) Promoted

== Women's Competitions ==
=== 2013 Northern Premier League ===
Forestry Tasmania Northern Women's Premier League
- Season: 2013
- Premiers: Launceston City

Pos	Team	Pld	W	D	L	GF	GA	GD	Pts
1	Launceston City	18	16	1	1	135	8	+127	49
2	Ulverstone	18	16	0	2	150	21	+129	48
3	Somerset	18	11	3	4	42	107	−65	36
4	Launceston United	18	8	2	8	60	52	+8	26
5	Northern Rangers	18	7	3	8	49	67	−18	24
6	Devonport	18	6	4	8	79	75	+4	22
7	UTAS Griffins	18	7	0	11	26	189	−163	21
8	Riverside Olympic	18	6	1	11	68	39	+29	19
9	Prospect Knights	18	4	2	12	96	33	+63	14
10	Launceston City Allies	18	1	0	17	26	105	−79	3

Source: sportstg.com
Rules for classification: 1) points; 2) goal difference; 3) number of goals scored.

=== 2014 Southern Premier League ===
Forestry Tasmania Southern Women's Premier League
- Season: 2013
- Premiers: Olympia Warriors

Pos	Team	Pld	W	D	L	GF	GA	GD	Pts
1	Olympia	21	18	1	2	84	28	+56	55
2	NTC	21	18	0	3	108	30	+78	54
3	Taroona	21	12	4	5	67	41	+26	40
4	Clarence United	21	10	4	7	51	32	+19	34
5	Tilford Zebras	21	5	5	11	46	71	−25	20
6	University of Tasmania	21	4	4	13	32	80	−48	16
7	New Town Eagles	21	2	4	15	36	92	−56	10
8	Kingborough Lions United	21	1	6	14	24	74	−50	9

Source: sportstg.com
Rules for classification: 1) points; 2) goal difference; 3) number of goals scored.

== Cup Competitions ==
Competition	Winners	Score	Runners-up
Milan Lakoseljac Cup	Olympia	4-2	Hobart Zebras
Women's State Wide Cup	Clarence United	2-1	Olympia
State Wide Social Vase			
