= 2012 Milan Lakoseljac Memorial Trophy =

2013 Lakoseljac Cup
Tasmania Statewide Cup

Tournament details
- Country: Australia
- Teams: 24

Final positions
- Champions: Glenorchy Knights
- Runners-up: New Town Eagles

Tasmanian soccer clubs from the regional divisions, competed in 2012 for the Milan Lakoseljac Memorial Trophy. This knockout competition was won by Glenorchy Knights, their third title.

== Preliminary Round ==
A total of 16 teams took part in this stage of the competition. All matches were completed by 12 March 2012.

The draw was as follows:

Tie no	Home team (tier)	Score	Away team (tier)
1	Metro Claremont (3)	2-3	Launceston City (2)
2	Kingborough Lions United (2)	3-0	Burnie United (2)
3	Launceston United (2)	0-4	Taroona (3)
4	Riverside (2)	0-3	Glenorchy Knights (2)

Tie no	Home team (tier)	Score	Away team (tier)
5	University (2)	5-4	Somerset (2)
6	Olympia Warriors (2)	12-0	Derwent United (3)
7	Beachside (3)	2-0	Nelson Eastern Suburbs (3)
8	Hobart United (3)	6-2	Southern FC (3)

== First round ==
A total of 16 teams took part in this stage of the competition. All matches were completed by 9 April 2012.

The draw was as follows:

Tie no	Home team (tier)	Score	Away team (tier)
1	Launceston City (2)	3-5	Taroona (3)
2	New Town Eagles (2)	5-1	Prospect Knights (2)
3	Glenorchy Knights (2)	3-0	Beachside (3)
4	Devonport City (2)	3-5	Tilford Zebras (2)

Tie no	Home team (tier)	Score	Away team (tier)
5	South Hobart (2)	4-1	University (2)
6	Kingborough Lions United (2)	4-0	Ulverstone (2)
7	Hobart United (3)	3-5	Olympia Warriors (2)
8	Northern Rangers (2)	0-3	Clarence United (2)

== Quarter finals ==
A total of 8 teams took part in this stage of the competition. All matches in this round were completed by 5 May 2012.

The draw was as follows:

Tie no	Home team (tier)	Score	Away team (tier)
1	Glenorchy Knights (2)	7-1	Kingborough Lions United (2)
2	Taroona (3)	5–3	Olympia Warriors (2)
3	South Hobart (2)	9–1	Tilford Zebras (2)
4	New Town Eagles (2)	1–0	Clarence United (2)

== Semi finals ==
A total of 4 teams took part in this stage of the competition. All matches in this round were completed by 27 May 2012. The draw was as follows:

Tie no	Home team (tier)	Score	Away team (tier)
1	Taroona (3)	1–5	New Town Eagles (2)
2	Glenorchy Knights (2)	0–0 (5–4 pen)	South Hobart (2)

== Final ==
The 2012 Milan Lakoseljac Memorial Trophy was held at the neutral venue of KGV Park on 11 June. Earlier in the day Olympia Warriors won the Women's Cup, and Clarence United won the Under 19s Cup.

11 June 2012	Glenorchy Knights	3 – 2	New Town Eagles	KGV Park
7:00 PM	Jason Dawes 3'; Aaron Marney 16'; Simon Strang 52'	Report:	Alex Leszczynski 31'; Liam Scott 70'	Attendance: 750
