= 2018 Football Federation Tasmania season =

Football Federation Tasmania
- Season: 2018

The 2018 Football Federation Tasmania season was the fifth season of association football under the restructured format in Tasmania. The men's competitions consisted of three major divisions across the State of Tasmania. The overall premier qualified for the National Premier Leagues finals series, competing with the other state federation champions in a final knock-out tournament to decide the National Premier Leagues Champion for 2018.

== Men's Competitions ==
=== 2018 NPL Tasmania ===
NPL Tasmania
- Season: 2018
- Champions: Devonport City

The 2018 NPL Tasmania season was played as a triple round-robin over 21 rounds.

Pos	Team	Pld	W	D	L	GF	GA	GD	Pts	Qualification or relegation
1	Devonport City (C)	21	16	2	3	69	18	+51	50	2018 National Premier Leagues Finals
2	South Hobart	21	15	2	4	63	32	+31	47	
3	Hobart Zebras	21	12	3	6	65	44	+21	39	
4	Launceston City	21	11	4	6	56	32	+24	37	
5	Olympia	21	9	3	9	45	40	+5	30	
6	Northern Rangers	21	6	2	13	39	68	−29	20	Moved to Northern Championship for 2019
7	Kingborough Lions United	21	4	3	14	35	54	−19	15	
8	Clarence United	21	0	3	18	16	100	−84	3	

Source: sportstg.com
Rules for classification: 1) points; 2) goal difference; 3) number of goals scored.
(C) Champions

=== 2018 Tasmanian Championships ===
==== 2018 Northern Championship ====
Northern Championship
- Season: 2018
- Champions: Riverside Olympic

The 2018 Northern Championship was the fifth edition of the Northern Championship as the second level domestic association football competition in Tasmania. The league consisted of 9 teams, playing 16 matches each over 18 rounds, followed by 3 rounds for the top eight teams, split into the top four, followed by the next four teams.

Riverside Olympic as Champions were promoted to the 2019 NPL Tasmania under a new promotion and relegation structure.

Pos	Team	Pld	W	D	L	GF	GA	GD	Pts	Qualification or relegation
1	Riverside Olympic (C, P)	19	15	3	1	57	16	+41	48	Promotion to the 2019 NPL Tasmania
2	Devonport City B	19	14	2	3	89	17	+72	44	
3	Somerset	19	12	2	5	69	38	+31	38	
4	Launceston City B	19	9	2	8	34	53	−19	29	
5	Northern Rangers B	19	9	3	7	36	33	+3	30	
6	Ulverstone	19	4	2	13	22	50	−28	14	
7	Burnie United	19	3	5	11	19	56	−37	14	
8	North Launceston Eagles	19	2	6	11	23	64	−41	12	
9	Launceston United	16	2	3	11	21	43	−22	9	

Source: sportstg.com
Rules for classification: 1) points; 2) goal difference; 3) number of goals scored.
(C) Champions; (P) Promoted

==== 2018 Southern Championship ====
Southern Championship
- Season: 2018
- Champions: Glenorchy Knights
- Top goalscorer: Callum Brown (21 goals)

The 2018 Southern Championship was the fifth edition of the Southern Championship as the second level domestic association football competition in Tasmania. The league consisted of 9 teams, playing 16 matches each over 18 rounds.

Glenorchy Knights as Champions were promoted to the 2019 NPL Tasmania under a new promotion and relegation structure.

Pos	Team	Pld	W	D	L	GF	GA	GD	Pts	Qualification or relegation
1	Glenorchy Knights (C, P)	16	15	1	0	81	10	+71	46	Promotion to the 2019 NPL Tasmania
2	Beachside	16	11	2	3	55	20	+35	35	
3	Hobart United	16	9	3	4	40	19	+21	30	
4	Taroona	16	8	1	7	39	33	+6	25	
5	University of Tasmania	16	7	3	6	41	32	+9	24	
6	New Town Eagles	16	7	3	6	36	35	+1	24	
7	Metro FC	16	2	5	9	19	68	−49	11	
8	Nelson Eastern Suburbs	16	2	2	12	17	40	−23	8	
9	Southern FC	16	0	2	14	11	82	−71	2	

Source: sportstg.com
Rules for classification: 1) points; 2) goal difference; 3) number of goals scored.
(C) Champions; (P) Promoted

== Women's Competitions ==
=== 2018 Women's Super League ===
PFD Women's Super League
- Season: 2018
- Champions: Ulverstone
- Top goalscorer: Jazmin Gorrie (35 goals)

The 2018 Women's Super League season, known as the PFD Women's Super League for sponsorship reasons, was the third edition of the statewide Tasmanian women's association football league. The league was played as a triple round-robin over 21 rounds.

Pos	Team	Pld	W	D	L	GF	GA	GD	Pts	Qualification or relegation
1	Ulverstone (C)	21	21	0	0	102	22	+80	63	2018 Women's Super League Champions
2	Taroona	21	11	2	8	44	34	+10	35	
3	Launceston City	21	10	3	8	59	40	+19	33	
4	Hobart Zebras	19	9	4	6	45	32	+13	31	
5	South Hobart	21	10	1	10	44	62	−18	31	
6	Kingborough Lions United	21	5	2	14	43	65	−22	17	
7	Clarence United	20	4	3	13	21	63	−42	15	
8	University of Tasmania (R)	21	3	2	16	13	53	−40	11	Qualification to the promotion/relegation play-off

Source: sportstg.com
Rules for classification: 1) points; 2) goal difference; 3) number of goals scored.
(C) Champions; (R) Relegated

==== Promotion/relegation play-off ====
9 September 2018

University of Tasmania	0–6	Olympia FC Warriors

== Cup Competitions ==
Competition	Winners	Score	Runners-up
Milan Lakoseljac Cup	Devonport City	1–0	South Hobart
Women's State Wide Cup	Taroona	3–1	Kingborough Lions United
State Wide Social Vase	Olympia FC Warriors	5–1	University of Tasmania

The Milan Lakoseljac Cup competition also served as the Tasmanian Preliminary Rounds for the 2018 FFA Cup. Devonport City entered at the Round of 32, and were eliminated in the Round of 16.
