= 2019 Football Tasmania season =

Football Tasmania
- Season: 2019

The 2019 Football Tasmania season was the sixth season of soccer under the restructured format in Tasmania. The men's competitions consisted of three major divisions across the State. The overall premier qualified for the National Premier Leagues finals series, competing with the other state federation champions in a final knock-out tournament to decide the National Premier Leagues Champion for 2019.

== Men's Competitions ==
=== 2019 NPL Tasmania ===
The 2019 National Premier Leagues Tasmania was the seventh season of the National Premier Leagues Tasmania, the top-tier men's association football competition in Tasmania. The competition was contested from 1 March to 7 September 2019 by nine clubs over 27 scheduled rounds. Each club played 24 matches, consisting of three meetings with each of the other eight clubs, and had three byes.

Devonport City retained the league title with 62 points from 20 wins, two draws and two losses, six points ahead of Olympia Warriors. South Hobart finished third with 47 points. Devonport represented Tasmania in the 2019 National Premier Leagues finals series, losing 3–2 to Maitland FC in the elimination round on 21 September.

The 2019 season was the last contested by Clarence United and Hobart Zebras as separate clubs. They amalgamated in September 2019 to form Clarence Zebras ahead of the following season.

Pos	Team	Pld	W	D	L	GF	GA	GD	Pts	Qualification or relegation
1	Devonport City (C)	24	20	2	2	91	23	+68	62	2019 National Premier Leagues Finals
2	Olympia Warriors	24	18	2	4	80	31	+49	56	
3	South Hobart	24	14	5	5	80	30	+50	47	
4	Hobart Zebras	24	12	6	6	74	36	+38	42	Merged with Clarence United at the end of the season
5	Glenorchy Knights	24	10	2	12	58	45	+13	32	
6	Kingborough Lions United	24	9	3	12	43	50	−7	30	
7	Launceston City	24	7	4	13	38	51	−13	25	
8	Riverside Olympic	24	4	2	18	26	72	−46	14	
9	Clarence United	24	1	0	23	8	160	−152	3	Merged with Hobart Zebras at the end of the season

Source: GameDay and BetExplorer
Rules for classification: 1) Points; 2) Goal difference; 3) Goals scored
(C) Champions

=== 2019 Tasmanian Championships ===
==== 2019 Northern Championship ====
The 2018 Northern Championship was the sixth edition of the Northern Championship as the second level domestic association football competition in Tasmania. The league consisted of 8 teams, playing 21 matches, facing each opponent thrice.

Pos	Team	Pld	W	D	L	GF	GA	GD	Pts
1	Northern Rangers (C)	21	16	4	1	69	16	+53	52
2	Devonport City B	21	15	2	4	60	34	+26	47
3	Launceston United	21	14	0	7	69	30	+39	42
4	Somerset FC	21	9	3	9	56	49	+7	30
5	Burnie United	21	8	1	12	39	64	−25	25
6	Riverside Olympic B	21	7	3	11	36	39	−3	24
7	Ulverstone FC	21	5	2	14	24	54	−30	17
8	Launceston City B	21	1	3	17	22	89	−67	6

Source: sportstg.com
Rules for classification: 1) points; 2) goal difference; 3) number of goals scored.
(C) Champions

==== 2019 Southern Championship ====
The 2019 Southern Championship was the sixth edition of the Southern Championship as the second level domestic association football competition in Tasmania. The league consisted of 8 teams, playing 21 matches, playing each opponent thrice.

Pos	Team	Pld	W	D	L	GF	GA	GD	Pts	
1	Hobart United (C)	21	18	1	2	115	30	+85	55	
2	University of Tasmania	21	16	2	3	73	35	+38	50	
3	Beachside FC	21	11	4	6	64	37	+27	37	
4	New Town Eagles	21	11	0	10	69	39	+30	33	
5	Taroona FC	21	10	2	9	48	44	+4	32	
6	Metro FC	21	6	3	12	32	67	−35	21	
7	Nelson Eastern Suburbs	21	3	4	14	26	57	−31	13	Did not return for 2020
8	South East United	21	1	0	20	13	131	−118	3	

Source: sportstg.com
Rules for classification: 1) points; 2) goal difference; 3) number of goals scored.
(C) Champions

== Women's Competitions ==
=== 2019 Women's Super League ===
Women's Super League
- Season: 2019

The 2019 Women's Super League season is the fourth edition of the statewide Tasmanian women's association football league. The league consisted of six clubs playing each opponent four times.

Pos	Team	Pld	W	D	L	GF	GA	GD	Pts	Qualification or relegation
1	Hobart Zebras (C)	20	16	2	2	108	23	+85	50	Merged with Clarence United at the end of the season
2	Olympia	20	15	2	3	79	18	+61	47	
3	Ulverstone FC	20	12	2	6	75	34	+41	38	
4	Kingborough Lions United	20	9	0	11	57	43	+14	27	
5	Clarence United	20	3	0	17	10	130	−120	9	Merged with Hobart Zebras at the end of the season
6	South Hobart	20	2	0	18	27	108	−81	6	

Rules for classification: 1) points; 2) goal difference; 3) number of goals scored.
(C) Champions

== Cup competitions ==
Competition	Winners	Score	Runners-up
Milan Lakoseljac Cup	South Hobart	2–0	Devonport City
Women's State Wide Cup	Hobart Zebras	3–1	Kingborough Lions United
State Wide Social Vase		–	

The Milan Lakoseljac Cup competition also served as the Tasmanian Preliminary Rounds for the 2019 FFA Cup. South Hobart entered at the Round of 32, where they were eliminated.
