= Southern League One (Tasmania) =

- Country: Australia
- Number of clubs: 7
- Level on pyramid: 4
- Promotion to: Southern Championship
- Domestic cup(s): Milan Lakoseljac Cup; Australia Cup
- Current champions: University of Tasmania
- Current: 2016 Football Federation Tasmania season

The Tasmania Southern League One (Division One) is a soccer league in Southern Tasmania. It sits below the NPL Tasmania and Southern Championship in the Tasmanian league system, and nationally, all these leagues also sit under the A-League. It is run by the Football Tasmania. The league includes teams from Hobart and Southern Tasmania. The league composition has varied in some seasons, containing only senior teams from clubs and at other times also including some reserve teams from clubs higher in the Tasmanian league system.

== Clubs ==
=== 2012 Southern League One Clubs ===
Team	Coach	Home ground	Location
Beachside FC		Sandown Park	Sandy Bay
Derwent United			Bridgewater
Hobart United		Pontville	Pontville
Metro		North Chigwell	Claremont
Nelson Eastern Suburbs	Michael Roach	North Warrane Oval	Warrane
Southern FC		Sherburd Park	Kingborough
Taroona SC		Kelvedon Park	Taroona

=== Previous clubs ===
Team	Coach	Home ground	Location	Current status
DOSA		Athletic Centre	Hobart	Playing in Social Leagues
Huon Valley SC		Huon Valley	Huon Valley	Playing in Social Leagues
University		Olinda Grove	Mount Nelson	Promoted to Premier League at end of 2011.

== Champions ==
The champions are the top of the table after the regular season, unlike many other football leagues in Australia there is no finals system in League One.

Season	Champions	Notes
2010	Beachside FC	Promoted to Premier League in 2011.
2011	University	Promoted to Premier League in 2012.
2012	Derwent United	No promotion due to league re-organisation caused by commencement of Victory League in 2013.
2014	Metro Claremont	Promoted to Southern Championship 2015.
