= List of football clubs in Australia =

List of football clubs in Australia may refer to:

- List of Australian rules football clubs in Australia
- List of soccer clubs in Australia
