= 2020 Football Northern Territory season =

Football Northern Territory
- Season: 2020

The 2020 Football Northern Territory season in Northern Territory. The men's competitions consisted of three major divisions across the State.

== League table ==
=== 2020 NorZone Premier League ===
The season began on 13 March, concluding with the Grand Final on 10 October.

Pos	Team	Pld	W	D	L	GF	GA	GD	Pts	Qualification
1	Hellenic Athletic	20	14	4	2	66	19	+47	46	Qualification to Final Series
2	Mindil Aces (C)	20	10	2	8	46	43	+3	32	Qualification to Final Series
3	Uni Azzurri	20	10	1	9	45	40	+5	31	Qualification to Final Series
4	Casuarina FC	20	7	5	8	32	38	−6	26	Qualification to Final Series
5	Port Darwin	20	7	4	9	34	42	−8	25	
6	Darwin Hearts	20	3	2	15	13	54	−41	11	

Source: mygameday
Rules for classification: 1) Points won; 2) Total goal difference; 3) Total goals scored;
(C) Champions

=== Finals series ===
Semi-finals
1	Hellenic Athletic	0
4	Casuarina FC	2
2	Mindil Aces	3 (8)
3	Uni Azzurri	3 (7)

Grand Final
Casuarina FC	2
Mindil Aces	3

=== 2020 NorZone Division One ===
The season began on 15 March, concluding with the Grand Final on 27 September.

Pos	Team	Pld	W	D	L	GF	GA	GD	Pts
1	Uni Azzurri	14	10	3	1	40	9	+31	33
2	Port Darwin (C)	14	10	1	3	44	26	+18	31
3	Hellenic Athletic	14	8	2	4	42	30	+12	26
4	Garuda	14	6	4	4	20	16	+4	22
5	Mindil Aces	14	4	2	8	25	32	−7	14
6	Palmerston Rovers	14	3	2	9	27	36	−9	11
7	Port Darwin (FWB)	14	3	2	9	15	39	−24	11
8	Litchfield	14	3	2	9	17	42	−25	11

Source: mygameday
Rules for classification: 1) Points won; 2) Total goal difference; 3) Total goals scored;
(C) Champions

=== Finals series ===
Quarter-finals
8	Litchfield	2	0	2
1	Uni Azzurri	2	4	6
4	Garuda	2	1	3
5	Mindil Aces	1	1	2
7	Port Darwin (FWB)	1	1	3
2	Port Darwin	5	6	11
15	Palmerston Rovers	0	2	2
2	Hellenic Athletic	2	6	8

Semi-finals
Uni Azzurri	0
Garuda	1
Port Darwin	2
Hellenic Athletic	1

Grand Final
Port Darwin	4
Garuda	0

=== 2020 Southern Zone Premier League ===
The season began on 6 June, concluding with the Grand Final on 3 October.

Pos	Team	Pld	W	D	L	GF	GA	GD	Pts
1	Alice Springs Celtic	15	8	3	4	47	25	+22	27
2	Verdi FC (C)	15	7	1	7	36	29	+7	22
3	MPH Vikings FC	15	6	2	7	39	47	−8	20
4	Stormbirds SC	15	3	4	8	20	41	−21	13

Source: mygameday
Rules for classification: 1) Points won; 2) Total goal difference; 3) Total goals scored;
(C) Champions

Notes

1. 2 more losses than wins as one match (Verdi vs Celtic) was awarded loss against both.

=== Finals series ===
Semi-finals
1	Alice Springs Celtic	1
2	Verdi FC	4
3	MPH Vikings FC	2
4	Stormbirds SC	4

Preliminary Final
Alice Springs Celtic	2
Stormbirds SC	0

Grand Final
Verdi FC	3
Alice Springs Celtic	0
