= Soccer in Tasmania =

- Governing body: Football Tasmania
- Representative team: Tasmania
- First played: 1879, Hobart
- Registered players: 18,522 (2023)

Club competitions
- NPL Tasmania; Northern Championship; Southern Championship; Southern League One

Audience records
- Single match: 8,061 (2007). Melbourne Victory vs Adelaide United (York Park, Launceston)

Soccer in Tasmania describes the sport of soccer being played and watched by people in the state of Tasmania in Australia.

The governing body for the sport is Football Federation Tasmania is a member of the Football Australia which controls the sport at a national level. Soccer is growing in popularity in terms of participation (particularly among youth). According to the Australian Bureau of Statistic, soccer is the highest participation sport amongst Tasmanian children aged 5–14 years (17.5%), attracting 23.7% males and 10.9% females. In the past the game has received federal government funding. Soccer is also growing as a spectator sport. However Australian rules football is the dominant code of football in the state in terms of both media coverage and attendance.

== Early history ==
The first recorded game took place in Hobart on 10 May 1879 when the Cricketers Football Club played a scratch match. The first recorded inter-club match took place a month later when the Cricketers took on New Town FC on 7 June (Hobart Mercury), described as English Association Rules. Days later both clubs joined the newly formed Tasmanian Football Association which became an Australian rules body.

The next recorded reference to British Football (as it was known at the time of its introduction) being played in Tasmania was in 1898 when a team of merchant and navy seamen played an army team on the Domain in Hobart. The first recorded competition was established in 1900 when an organised league was set up comprising three teams - Trinity, Gunners and Sandy Bay. Due to the Boer War organised British Football did not last long but in 1910 it returned and not long after North vs South matches were started.

=== International teams visit Tasmania ===
In 1923 Southern China, a team from Hong Kong, visited Tasmania becoming the first international side to tour Tasmania. The Tasmania state team beat Southern China 2–1.

A number of matches against international visiting teams have been hosted in Tasmania. In 1951 a touring English Football Association team defeated Tasmania 11–0 at North Hobart Oval. Three days later at York Park, Launceston, the FA team won 17–0, Jimmy Hagan scoring eight goals. A club friendly at North Hobart Oval in 1957 is another example of a match featuring an overseas team. Although the match was an Australia XI team vs Hungarian club Ferencvárosi TC, some sources incorrectly list it as a full international (Australia v Hungary).

In 1993 Japanese J-League side Nagoya Grampus Eight who at the time featured former England striker Gary Lineker toured Australia, training in Tasmania for a month, and playing a friendly against the senior Tasmanian state side. The Japanese side won the game 3–0.

=== Interstate clubs visit Tasmania ===
A National Soccer League game was held in Launceston, Tasmania in 2002 between Perth Glory and Melbourne Knights at Aurora Stadium. The match was a 1–1 draw and attracted a crowd of 5324 fans.

An A-League pre-season cup game was played in Launceston between Melbourne Victory and Adelaide United on 16 July 2006 at the same venue with Adelaide getting a 1–0 win, watched by a crowd of 6,834. A 2007 repeat of the Melbourne Victory, Adelaide United pre-season cup fixture saw 8,061 at Aurora Stadium. The result in 2007 was a 1–1 draw between the teams. The Melbourne Victory v Adelaide game continued in both 2008 and 2009. On 25 July 2010 Melbourne Victory hosted Central Coast Mariners in another preseason game at Aurora Stadium.

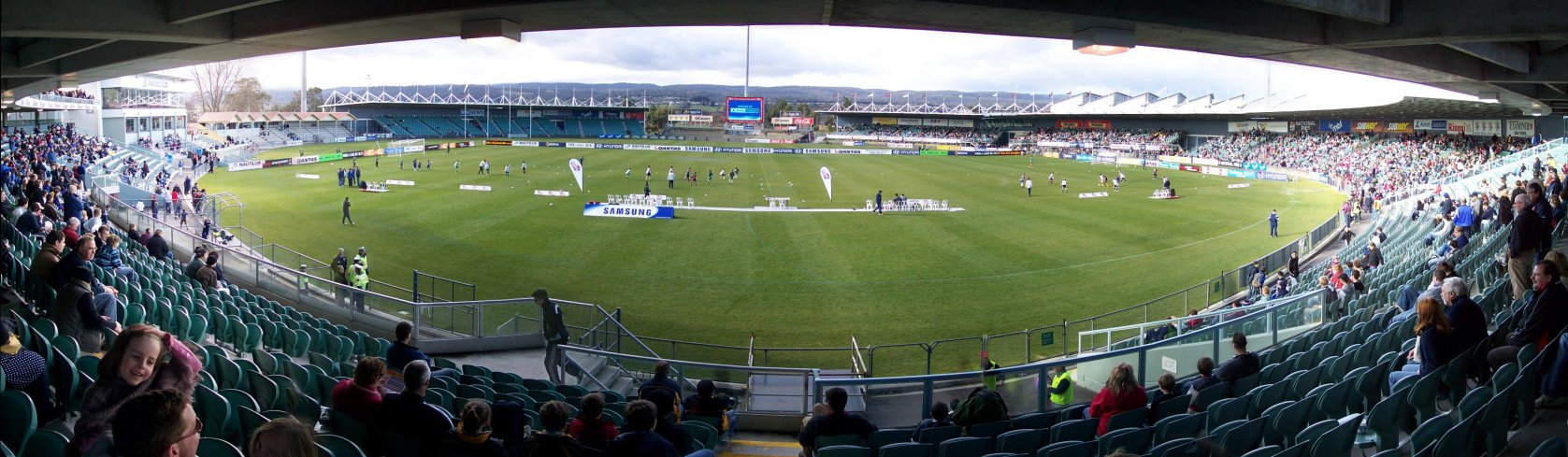
Melbourne Victory vs Adelaide United at Aurora Stadium

=== Bids to join national club competitions ===
Tasmania has never had a team in either the former National Soccer League or the A-League. A proposal for an NSL team began in February 2004, but was halted by the imminent disbandment of the league. Since the formation of the A-League, Tasmania has been cited as a future expansion proposition. In March 2008, a Tasmanian Football Taskforce was formed by a group of Tasmanian businessmen to investigate the formation of an A-League team. The working name of the group is Tasmania United FC.

=== World Cup aspirations ===
Football Australia CEO Ben Buckley met with Football Tasmania representatives in October 2007 to outline FFA's strategic plan for the game. Buckley stated that a FIFA World Cup qualifier match in Tasmania was a possibility.

== Representative teams ==
There is currently no senior Tasmanian representative team, and since the restructure of the sport nationally, the focus of the governing bodies has been to enter a club into a national competition. FFT occasionally selects an ad-hoc team from local leagues to play against large interstate clubs such as against Central Coast Mariners in July 2010 and Melbourne Victory in 2012.

There are, however, regular junior state representative teams. Football Federation Tasmania sends male and female youth teams to national talent carnivals held annually. In November 2008, a Tasmanian youth team played friendly matches against A-League National Youth League teams from Sydney FC, Melbourne Victory, Queensland Roar and Adelaide United. The Tasmanian team won three of the four matches.

== Competitions ==
The numerous local clubs which play in local competitions are all amateur, with most clubs having multiple teams in male, female and junior competitions.

=== League system ===
Tasmania has sporadically maintained a statewide league. The first state league began in 1978 and ran until 1981, before recommencing in 1988 and running until 1999. FFT had plans for a new statewide league competition from 2006 however this did not eventuate until the NPL Tasmania, known as the T-League during planning commenced in 2013. The eight team statewide league was previously known between 2013 and 2015 for sponsorship reasons as the Victory League, since 2016 it has been known as NPL Tasmania. It forms a conference of the National Premier Leagues (NPL) which sit under the A-League nationally. As an NPL conference the winners (top of the table) qualify for the national NPL finals.

In the years where a statewide league was not active, a play off between the Northern and Southern Premier League winner was used to determine the Tasmanian champions. This method was first used in 1910. In 2009 the State Championship was changed to incorporate a 3-week knock out Final series consisting of the top 4 teams from the Northern and Southern Premier Leagues.

There has been varying systems of promotion and relegation in the South between the Southern Premier League and Southern League One. Currently the system consists of the top team from Southern League One being promoted the following year and the bottom team from the Southern Premier League being relegated. Promotion and Relegation doesn't exist in the North. Leagues below League One in the South (and associated reserve competitions) and below the Premier League (and associated reserve competitions) in the North are considered to be social in nature and generally consist of additional teams from clubs playing in the higher divisions.

Women's and junior competitions are also run in the North and South of the state by Football Federation Tasmania.

=== Cup competitions ===
==== Statewide cups ====
There are male and female statewide knock-out cups (similar to the FA Cup) run annually with clubs from Northern and Southern Leagues. The male knockoutcup is named the Milan Lakoseljac Cup. The competition is as the name would suggest being a one legged (home or away) knock out cup (no group rounds). The competition consists of qualification rounds involving the weaker teams (from the lower divisions) who then are joined in the main rounds by the higher ranked teams. Since 2014 the Milan Lakoseljac Cup acts as a qualification for the national FFA Cup. In 2014 the winner of the Milan Lakoseljac Cup qualified Tasmania's sole entrant into the FFA Cup proper.

==== Pre-season cups ====
In the South pre-season cups are also run along graded lines (similar to the divisions of the regular season) known as the Summer Cup. This is a less prestigious title and is used mainly for preparation for the regular season. Similar cups are run in the North and North West known as the Steve Hudson Cup and North West Summer Cup respectively. The Steve Hudson Cup unlike most competitions in Tasmania is organised by the Launceston Soccer Club and not by FFT.

==== Youth cup competitions ====
The Main cup competitions for the Youth and Junior age groups are the Festival Cup held at Wentworth Park, Howrah and the Launceston Tournament (formally known as the Mano Cup) held at Churchill Park in Launceston.

=== Individual honours ===
There are two leading best and fairest awards given in Tasmania. The Vic Tuting Medal is the Southern award, while the George Dale Medal is awarded in the North.
