= Tony Pignata =

Australian football administrator and chief executive

Tony Pignata is an Australian football administrator and current chief executive of Football Tasmania. His previous positions include chief executive of Football Federation Victoria, Perth Glory, Sydney FC and inaugural chief executive of Wellington Phoenix FC in the A-League from 2007 to 2010. Pignata was awarded an OAM for services to Football in the 2026 Australia Day honours

== Career ==
=== Football Federation Victoria ===
Pignata was the CEO at Football Federation Victoria from October 2004 - January 2007 where he held overall responsibility for football operations, including the administration of football competitions, player registrations and referee development/administration.

=== Wellington Phoenix ===
Pignata was responsible for bringing out LA Galaxy with David Beckham, resulting in a then-record football attendance of 31,853. In 2009/10, he was CEO when Wellington Phoenix made the A-League Finals Series (playoffs), going within one game of making the 2009/10 Grand Final.

=== Sydney FC ===
In his time at Sydney FC, Pignata helped bring Italian football star Alessandro Del Piero to the club for two seasons, which helped increase membership, merchandise sales, sponsorship and TV viewership for Sydney FC and the A-League overall. In 2014, the club announced that its finances had turned around from a deficit of $7.2m to almost break-even under Pignata's leadership.

In the 2016/17 A-League season, Sydney FC were crowned Premiers after 20 wins, 6 draws and 1 loss culminating in 66 points for the regular season. They went on to win the A-League Grand Final in the equivalent of the play-off series against Melbourne Victory on 7 May 2017.

In 2017, Pignata was named by the Australian Financial Review as one of Australia's top 21 CEOs. He announced his resignation from Sydney FC three days after the 2017 A-League grand final win.

=== Perth Glory ===
In May 2018, he was appointed chief executive of Perth Glory FC. In the 2018-19 A-League season, Perth Glory were crowned Premiers with two games left of the season, finishing with 60 points, having 18 wins, 6 draws and 3 losses on the board.

They also reached the A-League Grand Final, which was hosted in Perth for the first time in the A-League, with a record-breaking attendance of 56,371. The Grand Final score after extra-time was 0-0, and ended in a 1-4 penalty shoot-out loss against Sydney FC.

=== Football Tasmania ===
On 24 August 2023 he was appointed as the CEO of Football Tasmania. In addition to the management of the organisation, he has also made the idea of a Tasmanian football specific stadium a priority, along with expansion of the Tasmanian NPL to 10 clubs and adding promotion/relegation to the league.

== Education ==
Pignata's secondary education was at Salesian College in Chadstone. He graduated from Monash University (Caulfield) in 1987 with a Bachelor's degree in business (finance). He also holds the Global Master in sports management and legal skills from the University of Madrid (ISDE – F.C. Barcelona).
