= Prospect Knights FC =

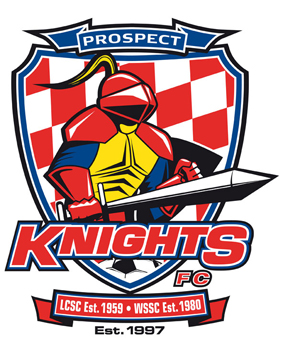
- Full name: Prospect Knights Football Club
- Founded: 1959
- Dissolved: 2015
- Ground: Prospect Park Sports Complex, Harley Parade, Prospect Tasmania
Home colours	Away colours

Prospect Knights FC, was an Australian soccer club from Prospect, Tasmania formed from the merger of Western Suburbs and Launceston Croatia Soccer Clubs the club competed in the Northern Premier League before dissolving in 2015. The club fielded a women's team, Under 18s as well as teams in all junior divisions. Prospect Knights FC played all their home games at the Prospect Park Sports Complex, off Harley Parade in Prospect, a western suburb of Launceston, Tasmania, Australia. The club has also competed at the annual Australian & New Zealand Croatian Soccer Tournament on several occasions, including the 34th tournament in Geelong in 2008 and the 35th held in Adelaide in 2009.

The club's official playing strip was a combination of red, white and blue (Red tops, White shorts and Royal Blue socks) with the away/clash strip being a black version of home strip (Black tops, White shorts and Royal Blue or White socks).

== History ==
The club was founded in 1959 by Croatian Australians in Launceston, Tasmania as Launceston Croatia Soccer Club. The club played in the lower Northern Tasmanian leagues until 1964 when the club went into recess. The club was reformed in 1970. The club was promoted to the state's top league, the Northern Premier League, the following season. The club's first stint in the league (1971–1977) was one marked by poor performances, with the club finishing in the bottom three each season. The 1978 season saw the Tasmanian Premier League go from a two conference system to a one statewide league. As a consequence the club was relegated to Division 1.

The club returned to the Premier League in 1982 with a return to the two conference system, but was relegated after finishing last. The club's third stint in the Premier League (1985–1987) proved to be the club's most successful. The club finished in the top 5 each season. In 1986 the club also won the Bohemian Cup, defeating Hobart Olympia 3–2. In 1988 the Premier League again became a one league system, so once more the club found itself relegated.

In 1997 Soccer Australia (The governing body at the time, replaced by FFA in 2003) made the ruling that ethnic affiliations (club names) should be ended by Australian football clubs. As a result, Launceston Croatia became known as Western Knights following a merger at the start of the 97’ season with fellow Premier League club Western Suburbs Soccer Club. Many players over the years had played for both Croatia and Suburbs, among them dual Rothmans Medal winner 1979–80 (playing for Glenorchy Croatia) Brian Davidson and George Dale winner (playing for Western Suburbs) Peter Brookes.

Western Suburbs (founded in 1980), themselves had some success during their 16-year history, including winning Devonports Night Series title and several Under 17s, 19s, Divisional, Reserves and Women's League and State titles. Like Croatia, Suburbs endured their own promotion and relegations from the Premier League to Division 1, dependent upon the combination of the club's on field performances, end of season league positions and what league structure Soccer Tasmania were putting in place from one season to the next.

Western Suburbs spent its first 10 years utilising the soccer and sports ground facilities at Prospect High School for home games and training. In 1990 the club began the clubrooms development at Prospect Park, Harley Parade the home of Prospect Knights FC. Following the merger of the two clubs, home games and training were split between Ogilvy Park and Harley Parade for the first season, whilst further developments were made at Harley Parade to include new clubroom and bar facilities in the late 1990s. The current clubrooms complex which was completed in 2008 incorporates 4 change rooms (2 home, 2 away), medical room, referees change room, 2 kiosks/kitchens and a large bar and function room which over looks and runs parallel with the main playing pitch.

The Prospect Knights FC logo reflects the club colours of the two former clubs, with the red, white and blue from Launceston Croatia and the gold and red from Western Suburbs gold, red and green. The club logo also incorporates the current club's establishment year, that of the merger in 1997 as well as the establishment dates of the two former clubs being 1959 for Croatia and 1980 for Suburbs respectively.

From 1997 to 2000 the club had mixed results in all leagues. The Under 17's and Reserves sides had some strong performances to have them amongst the top sides in their respective leagues, while there was another league title for the club's Division 1 Men's team in 1998 and one of the club's two Women's teams (Western Knights Gold) secured yet another league title in 1999.

In 2000 the Tasmanian Premier League reverted to a two conference system. Once again this allowed the Knights to return to the top flight of Tasmanian soccer, where it has remained until this day. In this, the club's fourth stint in the Premier League, the club has seen mixed results, with 2006 being the club's best season, finishing 4th. In 2007 the club changed its name to the Prospect Knights FC.

2008 saw the club's Premier League side equal its best season finish of 4th, with the Premier League Reserves side going the entire season undefeated to claim their first title since 1993 (Western Suburbs) and the Under 18s winning the U18 Northern Cup.

2009 the Premier League side had its best ever season finishing 3rd and the Under 18s side winning both U18 League and Steve Hudson Cup titles.

2011 saw the club's best finish to a season by its senior men's sides with the Premier League team securing the club's maiden Northern Premier League title in 52 years and the Premier League Reserves side finishing runners up. 2011 has seen the Premier League side have its best season in the club's history. Firstly coming Runners up to South Hobart in the Pre-season Steve Hudson cup, and then going through the season with just two defeats to secure the club's first ever Premier League title in 52 years, before bowing out of the Statewide Finals at the quarter final round to New Town. Along with this the Premier League Reserves came second to Devonport who were the only side to defeat them all season. The Under 18s had a mixed season, their final position of 7th was not possibly a true reflection of how they performed during the season. The women's team battled hard all season, memorably scoring against the much fancied Launceston City side and scoring a draw in their final match against Devonport to eventually finish in 10th.

To cap off a fantastic season for the club, the club's Premier League Captain Mark Baker became the first player from the club since Peter Brookes (Western Suburbs) in the mid-1980s to win the Premier Leagues prestigious best & fairest award the George Dale Medal.

2012 saw the Premier League side lose several players from the 2011 Championship team through work commitments, moving interstate/overseas or injury. For the first third of the season they were still in the mix for a repeat of 2011. As the season progressed though, a series of results meant that a top 4 spot was the final ladder position. In the Statewide Finals series Quarter Final the club was drawn against southern premiers South Hobart. Traveling down to Hobart they eventually went down 7–0 to end a long season. The Premier League Reserves had a season which introduced some of the club's under 18s to a higher level and this along with injuries and work commitments of other players meant that there was not the consistency of last years Runners-up side, eventually finishing 8th. The under 18s was a young side that was improving as the season progressed with several players during the season playing at higher levels in either seniors or reserves. The under 18s ended the season 9th. The women's team were big improvers in 2012 winning 7 games and finishing the season mid table in 7th position.

Faced with dwindling finances, the loss of players to the National Premier Leagues Tasmania and having to compete with the AFL for facilities, the difficult decision to put the club into recess was taken in March 2015.

== League Placings (Tasmanian Premier League only) ==
Season	League	Position
1971	Tasmanian Premier League North	11th (last)
1972	Tasmanian Premier League North	12th (last)
1973	Tasmanian Premier League North	12th (last)
1974	Tasmanian Premier League North	10th
1975	Tasmanian Premier League North	11th
1976	Tasmanian Premier League North	8th
1977	Tasmanian Premier League North	8th
1982	Tasmanian Premier League North	7th
1982	Tasmanian Premier League North	8th (last)
1985	Tasmanian Premier League North	4th
1986	Tasmanian Premier League North	5th
1987	Tasmanian Premier League North	4th
2000	Tasmanian Premier League North	8th
2001	Tasmanian Premier League North	9th
2002	Tasmanian Premier League North	7th
2003	Tasmanian Premier League North	6th
2004	Tasmanian Premier League North	7th
2005	Tasmanian Premier League North	9th (last)
2006	Tasmanian Premier League North	4th
2007	Tasmanian Premier League North	7th
2008	Tasmanian Premier League North	4th
2009	Tasmanian Premier League North	3rd
2010	Tasmanian Premier League North	5th
2011	Tasmanian Premier League North	1st
2012	Tasmanian Premier League North	4th

== Honours ==
- 1986 Bohemian Cup
- 1981 Cadbury Cup Runner-Up
- 1982 Northern Reserves League Premiers
- 1993 Northern Reserves League Premiers
- 2006 Northern Premiers (U17)
- 2008 Northern Cup (U18)
- 2008 Northern Premier League Reserves Premiers
- 2009 Steve Hudson Cup (U18)
- 2009 Northern Premiers (U18)
- 2011 Northern Premier League Premiers

== See also ==
- List of Croatian football clubs in Australia
- Australian-Croatian Soccer Tournament
- Croatian Australian
