= North Launceston Eagles FC =

North Launceston FC
- Full name: North Launceston Eagles FC
- Founded: 1980
- Ground: Rocherlea Football Oval, Rocherlea, Tasmania
- Capacity: 1,000
- League: Northern Championship
- 2018: 8th
Home colours

North Launceston Eagles FC is an association football club based in the suburb of Mowbray in Launceston, Australia. The club currently participates in the Tasmanian Northern Championship, at present, the highest level of football in Northern Tasmania. The club also has junior teams in multiple divisions. The senior club was reformed in 2018 as an extension of the junior club, 10 years after the original senior club dissolved due to a ban.
