= Garuda FC =

Australian soccer club

- Full name: Garuda Football Club
- Nickname: Garuda
- Founded: 2008; 18 years ago
- Ground: Darwin Football Stadium; Wulagi School Oval, Darwin
- Capacity: 6,000
- Manager: Tony Lim
- League: Northern Territory Premier League

Garuda FC (short for Garuda Football Club) is an Australian amateur soccer club based in Darwin, Northern Territory. Founded in 2008, the club competes in the Northern Territory Premier League (formerly known as the NorZone Premier League), which is the highest tier of regional soccer in the Darwin region under the jurisdiction of Football Northern Territory. The club is widely recognized by its distinctive corporate identity of orange and black team colors.

== History ==
Garuda FC originally began as a social recreational gathering for a group of local immigrants (mainly from Indonesia) and students who regularly played football together in Darwin in 2008. The community eventually grew and registered formally as an official club to enter the competitive structural divisions of Football Northern Territory. After spending several formative years climbing through the lower ranks, the club gained prominence through its reserves squad, which clinched consecutive Men's Premier League (MPL) Reserves championship titles. Following its sustained competitive growth, the senior squad officially transitioned into the top-flight Northern Territory Premier League. The club also fields teams in regional cup fixtures, including the Northern Territory qualifying rounds of the national Australia Cup competition.

== Community development ==
In June 2024, Football Australia and Football Northern Territory recognized Garuda FC as the national Club Changer, Club of the Month. The award celebrated the club's administrative dedication to establishing an accessible, diverse, and family-friendly sporting culture.

A primary strategic milestone achieved by the club was expanding female football pathways, leading to the successful establishment of two girls-only MiniRoos youth teams. To counter financial barriers to sports participation, Garuda FC utilizes corporate sponsorships and internal community fundraising to subsidize registration costs, while actively processing Northern Territory School Sports Vouchers to maintain financial affordability for working families. Culturally, the club maintains internal engagement through the publication of the Garuda Gazette, a monthly community newsletter launched in 2023 dedicated to highlighting milestones, praising local volunteers, and preserving community ties.

== Grounds and facilities ==
The club's dedicated practice, training, and operational facilities are centralized at Wulagi School Oval in Darwin. Official home fixtures for competitive league games, Premier League matchdays, and Australia Cup ties are played at the 6,000-capacity Darwin Football Stadium located within the Marrara Sports Complex.
