= Hobart City Beachside F.C. =

Hobart City F.C.
- Full name: Hobart City Football Club
- Nickname: Blowflies
- Founded: 1975
- Ground: Sandown Park, Sandy Bay
- Capacity: 500
- President: Adam Richards
- Manager: Romilton Amaral
- League: Southern Championship
- 2024: 9th of 9
- Website: https://hobartcitybeachsidefc.com/
Home colours	Away colours

Hobart City Football Club is an Australian semi-professional soccer club based in the suburb of Sandy Bay in Hobart, Tasmania. The club's colours are green and black. The club plays its home games at Sandown Park, known to fans as the Tropicana Cauldron or simply The Tropicana. In 2021, Beachside FC and Hobart City merged to form a club under the current name.

== History ==
=== Beachside FC ===

Beachside FC was founded in 1975 under the name Howrah Soccer Club because it played in the Hobart suburb of Howrah. The club then adopted the name Beachside HSC when it moved to its current home near Long Beach, in Sandy Bay keeping the HSC from Howrah Soccer Club despite no longer playing in that suburb. In 2011, the name was changed subtly to Beachside FC.

=== Hobart City ===
In 1977, Hobart City Azzurri was founded to provide a youth soccer club for the Italian community. In 1981, the Club changed its name to Hobart City FC, as a result of a mandate from Soccer Australia to remove all ethnic based names club titles. In 1986, the club become the Southern Tasmanian Seniors Division 1 Premiers and Knock Out Cup Winners. The club ceased to exist in late 1991, with its members joining other clubs or retiring. In 2021, family members of the original founders, began a re-creation of the Hobart City Azzurri.

=== Merger ===
In 2021, Beachside FC and Hobart City FC merged to form a new club under the name Hobart City Beachside FC and later changed to Hobart City FC In 2023

== Team Honours ==
- Southern Championship 1 Champions (2014, 2015, 2016, 2017, 2018, 2019)
- 2019 Men's Summer Cup Division A
- 2013 Southern Premier League Champions
- 2010 Southern Tasmanian Division One Champions (Promoted to Southern Championship)
- 2007 Southern Tasmanian Division One Champions

== Individual honours ==
The club's best and fairest medal is named after Alistair Hales while a yearly award is presented for the best contributor to the club's off-field success. This is named after James Dunsby, a club life member who died in an SAS selection test in Wales.

Year	Alistair Hales Best and Fairest	James Dunsby Clubman
2019	James Anderson & Brett Andrews
2018	Ben Whitehall
2017
2016
2015
2014	Jayden Welch	James Andrews
2013
2012
2011	Nathan Robinson, Jack Turner and Luke Atkin	Anthony Grznic

== Seasons ==
A summary of the seasons of the Beachside Senior Men's Team:

Season	League	National League Level	Final position	Coach	Notes
2019	Southern Championship	3	3rd	Brett Pullen
2018	Southern Championship	3	2nd	Daniel Lapolla
2017	Southern Championship	3	2nd	Daniel Lapolla
2016	Southern Championship	3	2nd
2015	Southern Championship	3	4th	Brett Pullen
2014	Southern Premier League	3	4th	Farrell Shaw
2013	Southern Premier League	3	1st	Nathan Robinson	An FFT league restructure led to Beachside joining the SPL.
2012	Southern League One	3	2nd	Brett Pullen
2011	Southern Premier League	2	8th(Last)	Brett Pullen	Relegated to SL1 at end of season.
2010	Southern League One	3	1st	Nathan Robinson	Promoted to SPL next season.
2009	Southern League One	3		Tony Kavanagh

== Teams ==
In 2014 the club has male teams playing in the Tasmanian Southern Premier League, Premier League Reserves, Under 20s & Social Division Three. The club also has a female teams playing in Division One and youth teams. All Beachside teams play in competitions run by Football Federation Tasmania.

=== Current competitions ===
Beachside has teams involved in the following senior competitions:

- Southern Championship
- Southern Championship 1
- Southern Women's Championship
- Southern Women's Championship 1
- Southern Championship 3
- Southern Championship 6
- Southern Women's Championship 1 Tier 1

== See also ==
- Association football in Tasmania
