= Dominic Old Scholars Association SC =

DOSA
- Full name: Dominic Old Scholars Association; Soccer Club
- Founded: 1989
- Ground: Weily Park, Bridgewater
- Capacity: 300
- Chairman: Rachel Langshaw
- Manager: Pedro Ramirez
- League: Southern Premier League Division 1
- 2006: 2nd

Dominic Old Scholars Association Soccer Club, often abbreviated to DOSA SC is a soccer club based in Bridgewater, Tasmania. The club is linked with the school Dominic College. While previously having competed at the highest levels available in Tasmania, the club currently plays in the social leagues in competitions run by the governing body Football Federation Tasmania. Its home ground is Weily Park Soccer Ground, Bridgewater.
