= Football Tasmania =

Governing body for soccer in Tasmania

- Formation: 2005; 21 years ago
- Headquarters: Rugby Park, New Town, Tasmania
- Members: 14,000+ (2012); 32 clubs (and 7 junior associations)
- President: Bob Gordon
- CEO: Tony Pignata
- Affiliations: Football Australia
- Website: http://www.footballfedtas.com.au

Football Tasmania (FT) is the governing body for soccer in the Australian state of Tasmania. The federation oversees competitions across Tasmania, Tasmanian representative teams, and development of the sport in the state. The federation was known as the Tasmanian Soccer Association until 1996, when it was renamed to Soccer Tasmania. In line with national changes in March 2006, it became Football Federation Tasmania. In February 2019, the organisation became simply Football Tasmania.

Football Tasmania sanctions all competitive football matches in Tasmania, either directly in the case of its own leagues, or indirectly, as is the case with local regional junior associations. FT also trains and appoints match officials in accordance with FIFA guidelines. FT governs the Tasmanian State League NPL Tasmania and the two underpinning domestic leagues, the Northern Championship, and the Southern Championship. FT also organises and runs several Tasmanian association football cup competitions. Responsibilities also include selecting and managing representative Tasmanian football sides at senior, men's, women's and youth levels.

Football Tasmania is a member of Football Australia, which is in turn a member of the Asian Football Confederation, and the world governing body FIFA.

== Overview ==
Football Tasmania is a member of Football Federation Australia, and has its administrative headquarters and main playing ground at KGV Park in Glenorchy, which acts as a home ground to Glenorchy Knights Club.

All of Tasmania's major football teams are members of Football Tasmania, and FT organise the only FIFA-sanctioned competitive leagues in the state for both men and women. A hierarchy of league divisions operates in both the south and the north for senior men and women, and aged based divisions operate for juniors. The Sports Association of Tasmanian Independent Schools (SATIS), also runs a league for Independent schools, and although not affiliated with FT, does so in accordance with FT rules and with their sanctioning.

Football Tasmania is one of nine Football Federation Australia National Training Centres – which act as regional training bases for elite and emerging junior male and female footballers. A number of young Tasmanians have been selected for national sides as a result of their participation in the NTC programs, including Luke Eyles and Paul Stevens.

Football Tasmania also administers the Tasmanian rollout of national soccer initiatives, including 5-a-side competitions, school visits and game development programs. FT also runs a number of popular and growing Futsal Leagues based in Hobart, Launceston, Devonport and Ulverstone.

== NPL/State League ==
Football Tasmania ran a statewide competition known as the Tasmanian State League, featuring sides from both the north and south of the state from 1978 until 1999, when it discontinued due to financial problems.

FT, working alongside member clubs, announced plans to re-launch the State League, to be known as the Victory League, in 2013. This league was planned to be sponsored by Melbourne Victory and featured eight teams; Devonport City, Launceston City, Northern Rangers, Olympia FC Warriors, Glenorchy Knights, Kingborough Lions, Hobart Zebras and South Hobart

In 2012 Football Tasmania, guided by the NPL (National Premier Leagues) model by other mainland Australian states formed the Tasmanian National Premier League. The inaugural season consisted of 8 clubs; in the north; Devonport City, Launceston City and Northern Rangers. In the south of the state were the remaining 5 teams; Glenorchy Knights, Olympia FC Warriors, Kingborough Lions, Hobart Zebras(Clarence) and South Hobart. Due to sponsorship commitments the league was named the Victory League from 2012-2014 and changed to the PS4 Victory League in 2015 also for sponsorship reasons. In 2016, the league changed names again to National Premier Leagues Tasmania in line with other divisions within the NPL.

== History ==
Soccer was first played in Tasmania during the colonial period, but was never as popular as cricket, and the advent of Australian rules football in the mid-nineteenth century, soon saw that code surpass both rugby and football in popularity within the island colony. The code was generally referred to as British Association Football, to distinguish it from Rugby, and Australian rules, which soon became known locally as 'football' or 'footy'. The term soccer originated in England, first appearing in the 1880s as a slang abbreviation of the word "association", often credited to former England captain Charles Wreford-Brown. It is not clear when the term 'soccer' came into common use in Tasmania, but by the early twentieth century it was the more common term.

The first recorded organised match in Tasmania took place between seamen from the Royal Navy and merchant vessels, who formed a team in 1898, and challenged the soldiers from the Tasmanian Military Forces garrison at Anglesea Barracks. The match was played on the Queens Domain, and sparked a renewed local interest in the sport. In 1900, Englishman Reverend Fred Taylor established a league competition between three newly formed sides. They were Trinity, (representing the University of Tasmania's Christ College), the Gunners (the soldiers from Anglesea Barracks) and Sandy Bay (army volunteers). The involvement of the Tasmanian and later Commonwealth Military Forces in the Second Boer War led to a suspension of football in the colony.

In 1909, when two friends J JB Honeysett and Norm Vincent, who were both keen players, decided to reintroduced competitive matches. They created the state's first league involving teams from both north and south, and they also established a North vs South match, played annually almost continuously since that time, except for brief suspensions during the First World War and the Second World War. The newly formed South Hobart Soccer Club took on Westralia at the "Association Ground", Washington Street, South Hobart in the first match of the new league, winning 4–1.

In 1909-1910 the Tasmanian British Association Football Association was created. Bishop Edward Mercer being the first president. Vice presidents were A. Brain, Cecil Fawns, Captain Rhodes, W.H.Burgess, H.C.Nicholson, H.Hume, J.W.Gould , J.G.Pottenger, treasurer Joseph J.B.Honeysett and Moin Soundy as secretary.

A rise in the number of migrants arriving in Tasmania following the First World War saw the popularity of the sport grow, and the Tasmanian football championship resumed in 1919. That season saw South Hobart Soccer Club begin a remarkable run in which they won the state championship a record five years in a row. Although four-in-a-row has since been done twice, by Caledonians (1955–58), and White Eagles (1988–91), South Hobart's record has never been broken. Football remained healthy in Tasmania for the next twenty years, although it continued to play second-fiddle to Australian rules football in terms of overall popularity. South Hobart and Sandy Bay enjoyed much success, winning seven titles each in the inter-war years.

The sport was again suspended for the duration of the Second World War, but once again post-war migration saw the game revived. The new migrants came increasingly to Tasmania from southern and eastern European nations such as Italy, Greece, Czechoslovakia, Poland and Yugoslavia, and for many of these new arrivals, football was the most popular past time. The post-war revival of the 1950s was a boom time for football in Tasmania. Player numbers rose sharply, and many new clubs were formed, merged and folded. It was in the early 1950s that the State Soccer Council was created to oversee the rapidly expanding popularity of the game in Tasmania. This period is often nostalgically referred to as the 'golden era' of Tasmanian football, and even featured visiting professionals from leagues such as Italy's Serie A, making guest appearances for clubs like Hobart Juventus. The old pre-war powerhouses South Hobart and Sandy Bay were pushed aside, and migrant-community based teams Caledonians, Olympia, and Launceston Juventus began to dominate competitions. Caledonians were almost unstoppable in the 1950s, winning six titles, including four-in-a-row between 1955 and 1958.

In the early 1960s, the State Soccer Council was renamed as the Tasmanian Soccer Association. This period saw the migrant communities grow to a size where their traditional rivalries from Europe began to influence the game in Australia, including in Tasmania. Although the new wave brought a new style and flair to the game, it also sometimes tarnished its reputation as those rivalries descended into occasional violence. The older clubs struggled for success, but the 1960s saw Olympia and Launceston Juventus play off against each other for the Tasmanian football championship on four occasions, Olympia getting the best of their northern opponents on three of them. The early 1970s saw the rise of Hobart Juventus, who won four state titles between 1969 and 1973, including a staggering 13–5 aggregate score over Riverside Olympic in the two-legged final of 1973. The 1976 State Championship play-off between Rapid and Launceston Juventus proved to be an all-time classic. The first leg finished 3–2 in favour of Rapid, but a 4–3 home win for Launceston Juventus saw the two-legged final finish 6–6 on aggregate, and go to penalties. The ensuing penalty shootout was an incredible 12–11 sudden death win to Rapid. This era also saw the rise of Glenorchy Croatia, who were crowned state champions three times in the 1970s.

With the game's popularity in ascendancy, the Tasmanian Soccer Association instituted a new Tasmanian State League in 1978, replacing the north-south champions play-off with a league of regular competition between the best sides in both the north and south. White Eagles, a side which primarily consisted of players of Polish Australian extraction, began to announce themselves as a new power within the state at this time. They won their first state title winning the final play-off in 1977 against Devonport City, and repeated that success by winning the first State League title the following year. For the first four seasons, the state title was simply awarded to the team finishing in first place. However players and fans missed the north-south play-off final, and financial problems began to cloud some teams in the State League. In 1982 it was temporarily suspended, reverting to northern and southern leagues with a play-off between each winner to determine the state champions. Hobart Juventus dominating this period, winning their first title in 1973 after a ten-year drought, and going on to win three-in-a-row between 1983 and 1985. The State League resumed in 1988, and White Eagles announced themselves as the State's finest in the late 1980s, winning four-in-a-row between 1988 and 1991, and only losing seven league matches in the four seasons. In the 1989 season they went undefeated, and won the league by a massive 15 points.

The 1990s failed to produce a side capable of dominating the leagues in the way the previous two decades had, with six different teams being crowned Tasmanian champions. But it was a period of great change for the code within all of Australia, including Tasmania. The violence that plagued matches between rival ethnically based football teams across the country had become widespread, with flares thrown into crowds of rival supporters on several occasions. The situation was damaging the reputation of the game across the country, and stunting both the development of the game, and the progress of the Socceroos on the world stage. Soccer Australia decided measures had to be taken, and outlawed ethnic affiliations for football clubs. This affected clubs across the country including in Tasmania. In 1997, a major re-branding effort was introduced to the game across the country. The Tasmanian Soccer Association was renamed Soccer Tasmania, and they obliged member-clubs to distance themselves from their traditional ethnic roots. In the south, Glenorchy Croatia (Croatian) became Glenorchy Knights, Olympia (Greek) became Hobart Olympic, White Eagles (Polish) became New Town Eagles, Hobart Juventus (Italian) became Hobart Zebras, and Caledonians (British Australian) became West Hobart Lions. Northern clubs were also affected, with Launceston Juventus (Italian) becoming Launceston Zebras, and then changing again to Launceston City FC, and Launceston Croatia (Croatian) becoming Western Suburbs Knights, and then Prospect Knights FC.

The first decade of the 21st century saw football grow well in Tasmania. player numbers continued to rise, particularly in junior divisions. Football Federation Australia'a efforts to rebrand the game, along with the Socceroos qualifying for the 2006 FIFA World Cup helped bolster the popularity of the sport within Tasmania. New Town Eagles had undoubtedly been the dominant club in Tasmania from the late 1980s until the start of the 21st century, racking up seven state titles between 1988 and 1998, but the new decade saw a shift in power, with University winning a long-awaited first state title in 1999, and repeated it 2001.

Despite not having won a state title since 1959, at the end of the century South Hobart SC were still the most successful team in Tasmania with 11 titles, although they were being rapidly caught by Hobart Zebras (Juventus), who had won their ninth title in 1993. The oldest surviving club in Tasmania were relieved to add a twelfth title in 2002, the first in 43 seasons. The southern dominance in the Tasmanian football championship was challenged briefly by Devonport City FC (2003, 2004) and Somerset FC (2006, 2007) who both won two titles each in the 2000s. Glenorchy Knights were crowned state champions in 2005, and Clarence United became state champions for the first time in their history in 2009. South Hobart took the title in 2008 and then five consecutive titles from 2010–2014, to extend their tally to 18, and ensuring they remain the most successful club of all time in Tasmania.

In 2009 Hobart Olympic took the decision to revert to their ethnically affiliated name of 'Olympia', adding the epithet 'Warriors', and adopted a new logo featuring a Spartan warrior's helmet to further celebrate the Greek Australian heritage. This decision was made ahead of the club's fiftieth anniversary celebrations, and taken with the full blessing of Football Federation Tasmania.

== Administration ==
=== Principals ===
- Bob Gordon – President
- Tony Pignata – Chief Executive Officer
- Glen McNeill – Competitions Manager

== Affiliated clubs ==
=== Southern clubs ===
- Barnstoneworth
- Hobart City FC (formed by merger of Hobart City and Beachside FC)
- Clarence Zebras Football Club (formed by merger of Clarence United FC and Hobart Zebras FC)
- Northern Suburbs DOSA Soccer Club
- Glenorchy Knights Football Club (formerly Glenorchy Croatia)
- Hobart United Football Club (1947–1950; 2002–Current)
- Huon Valley
- Kingborough Lions United Soccer Club (formed by merger of Kingborough United and West Hobart Lions)
- Metro Football Club (formerly Metro Claremont)
- Nelson Eastern Suburbs Football Club
- New Town Eagles Soccer Club (formerly White Eagles)
- Olympia FC Warriors (formerly The Grecians, Olympia, Hobart Olympia, Hobart Olympic)
- South East United FC
- South Hobart Soccer Club
- Southern FC (formerly Kingston Cannons and Christian United)
- Taroona Football Club
- University Soccer Club
- Woodbridge Soccer Club (formerly Woodbridge Whalers Soccer Club)

=== Northern clubs ===
- Burnie United
- Devonport City Soccer Club (formerly Devonport, Devonport Rovers, Strikers)
- Launceston United Soccer Club (formerly Matric)
- Launceston City (formerly Launceston Juventus, Launceston Zebras)
- Northern Rangers Football Club
- Riverside Olympic
- Somerset Soccer Club (Sharks)
- Ulverstone Soccer Club

=== Defunct teams ===
Teams with an asterisk* won competitions whilst active

Southern:

- ANM SC (became New Norfolk United) (1951–?)
- Hobart Azzuri (1970–79)
- Bohemians (1954 only)
- Brighton Caledonians*(?–?)
- Bronte Park (1954 only)
- Cadbury's (1922–26)
- Caledonians (?–?; merged with Hobart Rangers, became West Hobart Lions)
- Cascades*(1931–36)
- City United (1959–60)
- Corinthians*(1910–25)
- Hobart Dnipro (1970–?)
- Eastern Suburbs SC (?–?)
- Ex-Navy (became Hobart United) (1946 only)
- Gunners (1900–?)
- Hobart*(1910–1921 reformed as Hobart Athletic)
- Hobart Athletic*(1925–1932)
- Hobart Rangers (previously Hydro SC; 1958–67; merged with Caledonians)
- Hollandia FC (1954–59)
- Hutchins Old Boys (1935–?) Hydro (1954–57; became Hobart Rangers)
- Inter (1957–63)
- Kingston (?–?; merged with Rapid to form Kingborough United)
- Moonah (1951–52; formerly Titans)
- Navy Athletic (1928–35)
- New Norfolk United (1948–50; renamed ANM)
- Old Virgilians (1934–?)
- Rapid*(?–?; merged with Kingston to form Kingborough United)
- Sandy Bay*(1900–53)
- Titans SC (1948–1951; became Moonah)
- Trinity (1900–?)
- Wanderers (1949–52; 1954–?)
- Waterside (Waterside Workers, 1947 only)
- Wayatinah (1957–63)
- WestEnd United (1935–(1939)1945. Still existed during the war, but did not reform post-war)
- West Hobart Lions (?–1996; formerly Caledonians, merged with Kingborough United)
- Westralia*(1910–?)

Northern:

- APPM (Burnie Rovers)
- Burnie Spartans
- Elphin
- Georgetown
- Invermay*
- Launceston Matric
- North Esk
- North Launceston Eagles
- Papermakers (1952–?)
- Patons and Baldwins*(?–?)
- Prospect Knights FC*
- Silverstars (Queenstown) (1952)
- South Launceston
- St. George*(1910–20)
- St. Leonards Rovers (?–?; formerly Launceston Rovers)
- Tamar (?–?)
- Thistle

== See also ==
- Alison Alexander (2006). The Companion to Tasmanian History.
- Chris Hudson (1998). A century of soccer, 1898–1998 : a Tasmanian history.
