= Nelson Eastern Suburbs FC =

- Full name: Nelson Eastern Suburbs Football Club
- Founded: 1977; 48 years ago
- Ground: Risdon Vale Oval, Risdon Vale, Tasmania
- Manager: George Krambousanos
- League: Southern Championship 2
- 2021: 3rd
- Website: https://www.nelsoneasternsuburbsfc.com/
Home colours	Away colours

Nelson Eastern Suburbs Football Club is an association football club based in the suburb of Risdon Vale Risdon Vale, Tasmania in Hobart, Australia. The club currently participates in the Tasmanian Southern Championship 2, at present, the 4th highest level of football in Southern Tasmania. The club also has a women's team and an team in one junior division. Founded in 1977 the club spent much of its history playing in the highest level of Southern Tasmanian football.

== Recent history ==
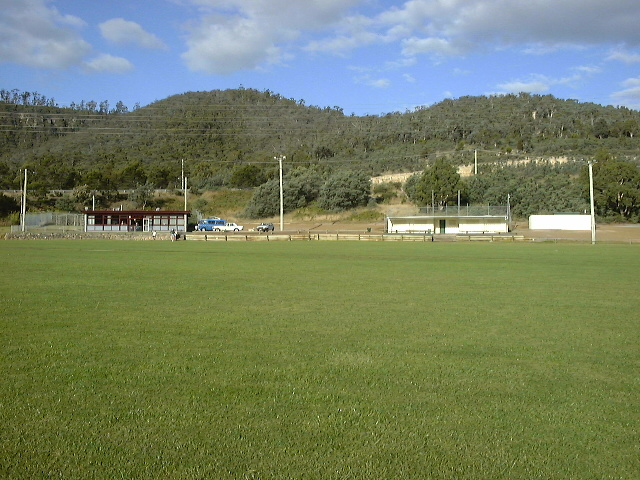
North Warrane Oval, home of Nelson Eastern Suburbs FC.

=== 2012 season ===
In 2012, the Football Federation Australia rebranded and revitalised the state-based competitions incorporating them under the National Premier Leagues banner, starting in the 2013 season. The subsequent league restructuring saw Nelson Eastern Suburbs promoted from the Southern League One (Tasmania) to the Southern Premier League, despite finishing last with four wins in 18 matches.

=== 2013 season ===
The 2013 season saw some positive results for the newly promoted club, including a narrow 4–3 loss to eventual champions South Hobart and defeating minor premiers Beachside 1–0. They finished the season 9th on the ladder, with five wins, four draws and 13 losses.

=== 2014 season ===
For the 2014 season, Nelson Eastern Suburbs were awarded a Skill Acquisition Program (SAP) licence. They were the only club outside the T-League to be granted this licence. The league had several teams withdraw before the season had started, with just six teams continuing on from the previous season. Poor results saw the club kick just 18 goals in their 20 matches, while conceding 74. They ended the season in 5th position, with three wins, two draws and 15 losses.

=== 2019 season ===
2019 saw Chris Barrell take the helm of the senior men's team and molded the team into a competitive outfit over the course of the season, however, wins were few and far between. Finishing the season in 7th the men ended the season with 3 wins 4 draws and 14 losses and a goal difference of -31. The men also competed in the Lakoseljac Cup, easing into the round of 16 with a 7-0 win over South East United they fell to NPL newcomers, Riverside, 3-0.
