= Burnie United FC =

Football club in Tasmania, Australia

Burnie United
- Full name: Burnie United Football Club
- Founded: 1978
- Ground: Montello Recreation Ground, Burnie
- President: Russell Philpott
- Coach: Ben Jones
- League: Northern Championship
- 2024: 6th of 8
Home colours

Burnie United Football Club is a soccer club which represents Burnie in the Tasmanian Northern Championship. The club also fields teams in all junior divisions, as well as women's teams. Burnie United play their home games at Montello, in Burnie, Tasmania. Burnie United was formed out of a unification in 1978 between Burnie Spartans and Burnie Rovers, both of which clubs played at Montello.

== Seasons ==
Season	League											Statewide Cup	FFA Cup
Season	Name (national level)	Pld	W	D	L	GF	GA	GD	Pts	Position	Tasmanian Finals	Statewide Cup	FFA Cup
2012	North Premier League (2)	16	0	1	15	18	64	-46	1	9th	DNQ	Premlinary round	Did not exist
2013	Northern Premier League (3)	16	5	2	9	27	45	-18	17	7th	DNQ	Did not enter	Did not exist
2014	Northern Premier League (3)	16	6	0	10	21	37	-16	18	6th	DNQ	First round	DNQ
2015	Northern Premier League (3)	21	7	4	10	33	44	-11	25	5th	DNQ	Did not enter	DNQ
2016	Northern Premier League (3)	21	2	0	19	25	95	-70	6	8th	DNQ	Did not enter	DNQ
2017	Northern Premier League (3)											Did not enter	DNQ

== Honours ==
- Northern Championship: 1978; 1979; 1996; 1997 Northern Championship Women 2023
