= Taroona FC =

Taroona
- Full name: Taroona Football Club
- Founded: 1978
- Ground: Kelvedon Park, Taroona
- Capacity: 500
- President: Sam Johnson
- Head Coach: Llewyn Tubb (men); Karen Wills (women)
- League: Southern Championship
- 2024: 2nd of 10
- Website: https://www.taroonafc.org/
Home colours	Away colours

Taroona Football Club is a soccer club which represents Taroona in the Tasmanian Southern Championship.

== History ==
The first club in Taroona was Taroona Ajax, which was formed in 1972. Taroon Ajax won the Division 1 league in 1973, gaining promotion to the Premier League for 1974. They were relegated in 1974 and the club disbanded in 1976.

Afterwards, a fresh club was started for juniors called the Taroona Junior Club. In 1978, they merged with the St. Mirren Soccer Club from Lindisfarne to form the Taroona St. Mirren Soccer Club. In 1985, after the Tasmanian Soccer Association asked clubs to have one name only, the name was changed to Taroona Football Club.

== Teams ==
Taroona Football Club fields men's and women's, youth and senior teams, across a number of divisions in Southern Tasmanian (FFT) competitions. The club's colours are black and white on their home kit and black and tangerine on their away kit.

- Southern Championship Men
- Southern Championship 1 Men
- Southern Championship 2 Men
- Women's Super League
- Southern Championship Women
- Southern Championship 1 Women
- Southern Championship 2 Women

== Season history ==
Men's

- Division 1: 1972–1973 Promoted to Premier
- Premier League: 1974 Relegated and disbanded
- Division 1: 1978–1992 Relegated to Division 3
- Division 3: 1993 Promoted to Division 2
- Division 2: 1994 Promoted to Division 1
- Division 1: 1995–2006 Promoted to Premier
- Premier League: 2007–2008 Relegated to Division 1
- Division 1: 2009 Promoted to Premier League
- Premier League: 2010 Relegated to League 1
- League 1: 2011–2012
- Southern Premier League: 2013–2014
- Southern Championship: 2015–present

Women's

- Division 1: 2007–2010
- Southern Premier League: 2010–2014
- Southern Championship: 2015–2016
- Women's Super League: 2017–2018

League Titles:

- Men's Division 1: 1973, 1990, 2006, 2009
- Men's Division 3: 1993, 2020
- Women's Division 2: 2008, 2009, 2012
- Women's Championship 1: 2018

Senior Cups:

- Men's Division 1: Summer Cup: 1987, 1989, 1999, 2004, 2006, 2022
- Women's Premier League: State Finals Series: 2010, 2011
- Women's Statewide Cup: 2011, 2018
