= Hobart United FC =

Football club in Tasmania

- Full name: Hobart United Football Club
- Founded: 2002
- Ground: Pontville Oval, Brighton, Tasmania
- Capacity: 1,000
- Coordinates: 42°41′5.2″S 147°15′39.2″E
- Coach: Joseph Stevens
- League: Southern Championship
- 2024: 5th of 10
- Website: www.hobartunited.com
Home colours	Away colours

Hobart United Football Club is an association football club that is located in Hobart, Tasmania. The club's senior men's and reserve men's sides compete in the Veto Southern Championship and Southern Championship 1 leagues. In addition to fielding senior sides, the club also fields junior and women's teams. Their home field is Pontville Oval in Brighton, Tasmania.

The club was founded in 2002, and many of its players are immigrants or refugees to Tasmania from African countries.

== Honours ==
- 2004: Southern Division 2 Premiers
- 2005: Summer Cup Champions
- 2005: Southern Division 1 Premiers
- 2008: Southern Division 1 Premiers
- 2010: Summer Cup Champions
- 2019: Southern Championship Premiers

== Club records ==
Season	League	P	W	D	L	F	A	GD	PTS	POS
2003	Southern Division 2	20	7	2	11	37	39	−2	23	6th
2004	Southern Division 2	21	17	4	0	72	17	55	55	1st
2005	Southern Division 1	22	16	2	4	80	34	46	50	1st
2006	Southern Premier League	18	0	2	16	18	83	−65	2	10th
2007	Southern Division 1	16	7	2	7	29	26	3	23	6th
2008	Southern Division 1	21	17	3	1	83	22	61	54	1st
2009	Southern Division 1	18	5	2	11	28	68	−40	17	5th
2010	Southern Division 1	21	11	3	7	63	51	12	36	4th
2011	Southern Division 1	17	11	2	4	60	28	32	26	4th
2012	Southern League 1	17	6	5	6	34	47	−13	23	4th
2013	Southern League 1	18	9	4	5	69	45	24	31	5th
2014	Southern League 1	16	3	4	9	43	59	−16	13	5th
2015	Southern Championship	19	8	2	9	42	43	−1	26	6th
2016	Southern Championship	18	10	2	6	52	43	9	32	4th
2017	Southern Championship	19	5	2	12	32	46	−14	17	7th
2018	Southern Championship	16	9	3	4	40	19	21	30	3rd
2019	Southern Championship	21	18	1	2	115	30	85	55	1st
2020	Southern Championship	16	10	1	5	42	30	12	31	3rd
2021	Southern Championship	21	13	4	4	62	27	35	43	3rd
2022	Southern Championship	22	14	4	4	65	27	38	46	3rd
2023	Southern Championship	16	6	3	7	27	33	-6	21	7th
2024	Southern Championship	21	11	1	9	62	53	9	34	5th
2025	Southern Championship	18	6	1	11	32	58	-26	19	7th
