= Capital Premier League =

Capital Premier League ACT
- Founded: 1967 (59 years ago) (as Division 2); 2019 (7 years ago) (as NPL2); 2022 (4 years ago) (as Capital Premier League)
- Folded: 2025 (1 year ago)
- Country: Australia
- State: (Australian Capital Territory) ACT (New South Wales) NSW
- Confederation: AFC
- Number of clubs: 8
- Domestic cup(s): Australia Cup; Federation Cup
- Last champions: Canberra Olympic (2025)
- Current premiers: Belconnen United (2025)
- Most championships: ANU FC (9)
- Website: Capital Premier League

The Capital Premier League (formerly known as NPL ACT 2 or simply NPL2) was an association football competition contested by clubs affiliated to Capital Football. The league currently defunct and was the second highest level (level 2) competition in the Australian Capital Territory (ACT) region. It was a 2nd tier in ACT Capital Football and sits in Level 3 in the overall Australian league system. Prior to 2019, the league was known as the Capital League and was the top division of the ACT State League system and National Premier Leagues Capital Football 2 until end of 2025 seasons when the league folded in place by Capital Football.

== History ==
Established in 1967 as Division 2 the level 2 division in the ACT has been competed every year except a three-year gap between 1984 and 1986, The league has been renamed three times prior to 2019 with the original Division 2 title changed to State League One in 1992 before becoming the Capital League in 2013.

1 August 2018, Capital Football announced a major overhaul of the local football structure with the top two divisions (level 1 and 2) linked with the introduction of promotion and relegation between the top two men's divisions. The top two leagues were re-branded from NPL Capital Football and the Capital League to NPL1 and NPL2.

3 August 2018, a group of current NPL clubs in the ACT raised concerns regarding the structure changes and the introduction of promotion and relegation. In particular the concern around governances was raised by Woden-Weston president Steve Rohan-Jones. While Canberra Olympic coach, Frank Cachia, raised the issues around juniors and the sustainability of an inter-state team if it gets relegated.

31 August 2018, Capital Football opened the application process for interested teams to apply to join the NPL1 and NPL2 leagues.

28 September 2018, Capital Football announced the successful applications for teams for the 2019 NPL season. NPL1 would consist of nine teams with seven teams selected for NPL2. Out of the ten teams that competed in the 2018 Capital League season, seven teams were successful in gaining NPL2 status while three teams, Narrabundah FC, Monaro Panthers reserves, and Canberra Olympic reserves were all unsuccessful. The bottom team of NPL1 in 2019 would be relegated to NPL2 for the 2020 season but no team from NPL2 would be promoted to even the two leagues to eight teams each.

Narrabundah FC lodged an official appeal supported by a number of other Capital Football affiliated clubs. Narrabundah's appeal was successful, and on 8 November 2018 Capital Football released a new declaration of leagues for the 2019 NPL level that included Narrabundah FC as an NPL2 participant.

15 November 2018, NSW regional club, Wagga City Wanderers, announced it was transferring from NSW State League to Capital Football and would join the NPL2 and NPLW leagues. This move resulted in both NPL1 and NPL2 leagues having nine teams each for the 2019 season.

== Format ==
The regular season runs between April and September each year and consists of 16 rounds with four matches played each round and one team sitting out a bye. Each team plays each other twice (home and away) and sits out two byes over the course of the season. The top four teams qualify for the finals series (finals). The team that finishes first in the league standings is crowned league premiers and, from 2020, will be promoted to NPL1.

Finals is run over three weeks with the major (1 vs 2) and minor (3 vs 4) semi-finals held in the first week. The winner of the major semi-final progresses to the grand final in week 3 and the loser progresses to the preliminary final in week 2. The winner of the minor semi-final progresses to the preliminary final and the loser is eliminated.

== Clubs ==
Current CPL ACT based clubs
Current CPL NSW based clubs

The inaugural season of NPL Capital Football 2 was originally planned to only have seven clubs, as published by Capital Football on 1 August 2018. After a successful appeal by Narrabundah a revised declaration of clubs for NPL level was released by Capital football on 8 August 2018 that increased the number of clubs from seven to eight. In November 2018, Wagga City Wanderers announced the club was leaving Football NSW and switching affiliation to Capital Football so the club's first grade team was added to NPL2 to bring the overall number up to nine (equal numbers with NPL1).

Eight of the inaugural season clubs were members of the previous ACT level two league (Capital league) in the previous season (2018). All nine inaugural season clubs were making their first appearance in the National Premier Leagues system, having previously competed in NSW and ACT State League systems.

=== Current clubs ===
As of the 2025 Capital Premier League season, there are 8 clubs competing in the CPL.

2025 CPL
Club	Location	State	Home grounds	Founded	Joined league	2024 Position
ANU FC	Acton	ACT	ANU Willows Oval	1962	2019	2nd
Belconnen United	McKellar	ACT	McKellar Park	1970	2023	3rd
Brindabella Blues	Calwell	ACT	Everlast Enclosed	1990	2019	4th
Canberra Juventus	Hawker	ACT	Hawker Football Centre	1953	2023	6th
Canberra Olympic	O'Connor	ACT	O'Connor Enclosed	1955	2025	8th *Relegated from NPL 2024
Canberra White Eagles	Phillip	ACT	Woden Park	1992	2019	7th
Wagga City Wanderers	Wagga Wagga	NSW	Gissing Oval	2014	2019	5th
West Canberra Wanderers	Pearce	ACT	Melrose High School (Canberra)	2014	2024	8th

=== Former Premier League or NPL 2 clubs ===
Club	Location	State	Home ground	Founded	Last season
Narrabundah FC	Narrabundah	ACT	Narrabundah 2	1976	2021
Queanbeyan City	Queanbeyan	NSW	High Street Oval	1966	2024
O'Connor Knights	O'Connor	ACT	O'Connor Enclosed	1997	2021
Riverina Rhinos	Griffith	NSW	SolarMad Stadium	2014	2020
Southern Tablelands United	Goulburn	NSW	Cookbundoon 2	2017	2019
Tuggeranong United	Greenway	ACT	Greenway Enclosed	1976	2022
Weston-Molonglo FC	Waramanga	ACT	Waramanga Playing Fields	1971	2022
Yoogali SC	Griffith	NSW	SolarMad Stadium	1954	2023

== Honours ==
=== Capital Premier League seasons (2022–2025) ===
Season	Regular season		Finals			Team promoted to NPL1
Season	League Premiers	League Runners-Up	Champions	Score	Finalists	Team promoted to NPL1
2022	Tuggeranong United	Queanbeyan City	Tuggeranong United	2–1 (AET)	Brindabella Blues	Tuggeranong United
2023	Yoogali SC	Queanbeyan City	Yoogali SC	3–0	Queanbeyan City	Yoogali SC
2024	Queanbeyan City	ANU FC	Queanbeyan City	2–0	Brindabella Blues	Queanbeyan City
2025	Belconnen United	Canberra Olympic	Canberra Olympic	3–1	ANU FC	Belconnen United; Canberra Olympic; Brindabella Blues; Canberra Juventus; Canberra White Eagles

=== NPL2 seasons (2019–2021) ===
A snapshot of the NPL Capital Football 2 seasons since its inauguration in 2019.

Season	Regular season		Finals			Team promoted to NPL1
Season	League Premiers	League Runners-Up	Champions	Score	Finalists	Team promoted to NPL1
2019	Canberra White Eagles	O'Connor Knights	ANU FC	5–1	O'Connor Knights	–
2020	No Premier declared.		Wagga City Wanderers	2–2 (5-4 (p))	Yoogali SC	–
2021	O'Connor Knights	ANU FC	not held.^{1}			O'Connor Knights

Notes:

^{1} ACT finals series cancelled due to the COVID-19 pandemic in Australia.

=== NPL2/Capital Premier League all-time record ===
Premierships
Club	Premierships	Years
Canberra White Eagles	1	2019
O'Connor Knights	1	2021
Tuggeranong United	1	2022
Yoogali SC	1	2023
Queanbeyan City	1	2024
Belconnen United	1	2025

Championships
Club	Championships	Years
ANU FC	1	2019
Wagga City Wanderers	1	2020
Tuggeranong United	1	2022
Yoogali SC	1	2023
Queanbeyan City	1	2024
Canberra Olympic	1	2025

== Pre-NPL Honours ==
=== Pre-NPL seasons (1967–2018) ===
A snapshot of each ACT division two season between 1967 and 2018 before being aligned with the NPL in 2019.

Legend: BOLD = first league or finals title a club secures

Season	Competition	Regular season		Finals		
Season	Competition	League Premiers	League Runners-Up	Champions	Score	Finalists
1967	Division Two	**Inter Monaro**	Kosciusko	**Inter Monaro**	1–0	RAAF
1968	Division Two	Season standings & results unknown				
1969	Division Two	Season standings & results unknown				
1970	Division Two	Season standings & results unknown				
1971	Division Two	Season standings & results unknown				
1972	Division Two	Season standings & results unknown				
1973	Division Two	**Queanbeyan Macedonia**	ANU FC	No Finals Series held		
1974	Division Two	**ANU FC**	Belconnen United	No Finals Series held		
1975	Division Two	Season standings & results unknown				
1976	Division Two	Season standings & results unknown				
1977	Division Two	**Canberra United**	ANU FC	**Canberra United**	3–1	ANU FC
1978	Division Two	Queanbeyan Macedonia	RMC	**Queanbeyan Macedonia**	3–1	RMC
1979	Division Two	**Kambah United**	Concordia Phillip	**Concordia Phillip**	2–1	Kambah United
1980	Division Two	**Polonia White Eagles**	JAT United	**Polonia White Eagles**	2–1	Canberra North
1981	Division Two	**Croatia Deakin**	Unknown	**Canberra North**	3–2	Croatia Deakin
1982	Division Two	**Cooma FC**	RMC	Unknown Finals Series results		
1983	Division Two	**RMC**	Narrabundah	Unknown Finals Series results		
**No Division 2 league run between 1984 and 1986**
1987	Division Two	**Weston Creek**	Canberra City	**ANU FC**	1–0	Weston Creek
1988	Division Two	Queanbeyan Macedonia	Canberra City	Queanbeyan Macedonia	Unknown	ANU FC
1989	Division Two	**ADFA**	ANU FC	**Downer Olympic**	3–0	ADFA
1990	Division Two	**Downer Olympic**	Condors	Queanbeyan Macedonia	3–1	Condors
1991	Division Two	ADFA	Queanbeyan Macedonia	**ADFA**	4–1	Condors
1992	State League One	**Latin America**	Unknown	**University of Canberra**	Unknown	Latin America
1993	State League One	Queanbeyan City	Unknown	Unknown Finals Series results		
1994	State League One	**Canberra White Eagles**	ANU FC	ANU FC	Unknown	Canberra White Eagles
1995	State League One	Queanbeyan City	ANU FC	Queanbeyan City	Unknown score and losing team	
1996	State League One	ANU FC	Burns FC	**Cooma FC**	2–1	ANU FC
1997	State League One	**Capital City Suns**	Cooma FC	Burns FC	2–1	Capital City Suns
1998	State League One	**Burns FC**	ANU FC	ANU FC	2–1	Burns FC
1999	State League One	**O'Connor Knights**	Tuggeranong United	**Tuggeranong United**	6–1	O'Connor Knights
2000	State League One	Canberra White Eagles	ANU FC	ANU FC	1–0	Canberra White Eagles
2001	State League One	Cooma FC	Belconnen United	Cooma FC	1–0	Belconnen United
2002	State League One	Cooma FC	Canberra Olympic	UCU Pumas	1–0	Canberra City
2003	State League One	O'Connor Knights	Canberra City	**Canberra White Eagles**	2–1	O'Connor Knights
2004	State League One	Canberra White Eagles	ANU FC	Canberra White Eagles	2–0	ANU FC
2005	State League One	ANU FC	Queanbeyan City	ANU FC	4–1	Queanbeyan City
2006	State League One	Queanbeyan City	Tuggeranong United	Queanbeyan City	1–0	Tuggeranong United
2007	State League One	Cooma FC	Southern Tablelands	Canberra White Eagles	3–1	Cooma FC
2008	State League One	**Southern Tablelands**	Cooma FC	Canberra White Eagles	3–2	Narrabundah
2009	State League One	Canberra White Eagles	Southern Tablelands	Canberra White Eagles	1–0	Cooma FC
2010	State League One	Canberra White Eagles	Queanbeyan City	Queanbeyan City	1–0	Canberra White Eagles
2011	State League One	Canberra White Eagles	O'Connor Knights	Canberra White Eagles	5–1	ANU FC
2012	State League One	Canberra White Eagles	Queanbeyan City	Canberra White Eagles	2–1	Queanbeyan City
2013	Capital League	Canberra White Eagles (Group A); **Narrabundah** (Group B)	ANU FC (Group A); Queanbeyan City (Group B)	**Narrabundah**	0–0 (5–3)	Queanbeyan City
2014	Capital League	ANU FC	Canberra White Eagles	**Weston Molongo**	2–0	ANU FC
2015	Capital League	Monaro Panthers	ANU FC	ANU FC	1–1 (4–3)	Canberra White Eagles
2016	Capital League	ANU FC	Canberra White Eagles	ANU FC	6–3	Queanbeyan City
2017	Capital League	ANU FC	O'Connor Knights	ANU FC	5–1	O'Connor Knights
2018	Capital League	Queanbeyan City	Canberra White Eagles	ANU FC	6–1	Canberra White Eagles

=== Pre-NPL all-time record ===
Pre-NPL era Division 2 honours since 1967 till 2018, prior to the transition to NPL in 2019.

Premierships
Club	Premierships	Years
Canberra White Eagles	7	1994, 2004, 2009, 2010, 2011, 2012, 2013
Queanbeyan City	7	1973, 1978, 1988, 1993, 1995, 2006, 2018
ANU FC	6	1974, 1996, 2005, 2014, 2016, 2017
Cooma FC	4	1982, 2001, 2002, 2007
ADFA Vikings	2	1989, 1991
Monaro Panthers	2	1967, 2015
O'Connor Knights	2	1999, 2003
Burns FC	1	1977
AIS	1	1992
Balkan	1	1956
Burns FC	1	1984
Canberra FC	1	1981
Canberra Olympic	1	1990
Capital City Suns	1	1997
Latin America	1	1992
Narrabundah FC	1	2013
Polonia White Eagles	1	1980
RMC	1	1983
Southern Tablelands	1	2008
Tuggeranong United	1	1979
Weston Molongo FC	1	1987

Championships
Club	Championships	Years
ANU FC	8	1987, 1994, 2000, 2005, 2015, 2016, 2017, 2018
Canberra White Eagles	7	2003, 2004, 2007, 2008, 2009, 2011, 2012
Queanbeyan City	5	1978, 1988, 1990, 1995, 2006
Burns FC	2	1977, 1997
Cooma FC	2	1996, 2001
UCU Pumas	2	1992, 2002
ADFA Vikings	1	1991
Canberra North	1	1981
Canberra Olympic	1	1989
Concordia Phillip	1	1979
Monaro Panthers	1	1967
Narrabundah FC	1	2013
Polonia White Eagles	1	1980
Weston Molongo FC	1	2014

== See also ==
- Soccer in the Australian Capital Territory
- Sport in the Australian Capital Territory
