= Gungahlin United FC Womens =

Gungahlin United FC
- Full name: Gungahlin United Football Club
- Nickname: Gunners
- Founded: 2015
- Ground: Gungahlin Enclosed Oval
- Capacity: 1,150
- Coordinates: 35°11′6″S 149°7′38″E
- President: Mark Supple
- Head Coach: Jenny Rolfe
Home colours	Away colours

Gungahlin United FC Womens was an Australian amateur women's association football club based in the Canberra district of Gungahlin, ACT. Established in 2015 by Gungahlin United FC, the team currently competed in the ACT Women's National Premier League with home matches played at Gungahlin Enclosed Oval.

== History ==
In 2015, Gungahlin United FC established its first ACT elite level women's team to compete in the ACT Women's National Premier League. The team is full of local talent, showcasing notable players such as Sally Rojahn (Canberra United), Grace Field (Canberra United), Najwa Allen (Najwa FC), Brittany Palombi (Najwa FC), Ashleigh Palombi (WPL Golden boot 2012, 2013, 2015)

== Home venue ==
Gungahlin United's WNPL first team home venue was the Gungahlin Enclosed Oval. The ground was constructed in 2013/14 with the official opening on 7 March 2014. The stadium has a seating capacity of 1,150 (550 under cover) and an overall capacity of 5,000. Gungahlin United is one of four tenants of the venue with the multi-purpose field being used for association football, Australian rules football, rugby union and rugby league. Canberra based Stewart Architecture was the architect of the stadium which cost stadium owner, the ACT Government, $12.5 million to build. The ground has a natural water-efficient grass surface, team and officials' changing rooms, public toilets, canteen and storage for both users and maintenance staff. Rooms are provided for coaches, the ground announcer and the operator of the electronic scoreboard. There is also a club room which can be used for after/pre-match functions.

== Season-by-season results ==
The below table is updated with the statistics and final results for Gungahlin United FC following the conclusion of each ACT Women's National Premier League season.

Season	GP	W	D	L	GF	GA	GD	PTS	League	Finals
2015	18	5	5	8	33	32	+1	20	6th	Did not Qualify
2016	15	9	3	3	55	19	+36	30	3rd	Lost preliminary final
2017	21	13	2	6	74	30	+44	41	Runner-up	Lost preliminary final

== See also ==
- Gungahlin United FC
- Sport in the Australian Capital Territory
- Soccer in the Australian Capital Territory
