= Queanbeyan City FC =

- Full name: Queanbeyan City Football Club
- Nicknames: The Lions, QCFC
- Founded: 1966
- Ground: High Street Oval; Queanbeyan
- Capacity: 1,700; 1,000
- Coordinates: 35°20′53″S 149°14′15″E
- Chairman: Zoran Duckinoski
- Manager: Goran Josifoski
- League: NPL Capital Football
- 2026: 5th of 11
- Website: http://qcfc.com.au
Home colours	Away colours

Queanbeyan City Football Club is an Australian Semi-Professional association football club based in the NSW city of Queanbeyan, Australia. The club was founded in 1966 and currently competes in National Premier Leagues Capital Football ACT competitions

== History ==
The club was established in 1966 as Queanbeyan Makedonia by Done Dimov, Angelo Hatzelis and Victor Tsakalos. The club registered with the ACT Soccer Federation on 17 March 1966 and entered the ACT Second Division. However, Hungaria was forced to fold and Queanbeyan was chosen to replace the club in the first division.

The Lions spent a number of years in the first division with the club finishing runner-up in the league in both 1969 and 1970. Queanbeyan was ten minutes from claiming the 1969 championship with the club 2–1 up over Olympic with ten minutes to play. The match was abandoned after eighty minutes due to fighting and the ACT Soccer Federation chose not to replay the match.

Macedonia won its first titles in the 1970s with two-second division league premierships in 1973 and 1978 as well as the ‘78 finals championship.

QCFC enjoyed considerable success in the ACT Second Division in the 1980s as well as when the completion was re-branded State League One in the 1990s. A number of titles were lifted including three premierships in 1988, 1993 and 1995 as well as two championships in 1990 and 95.

In 2013, Capital Football introduced a revamped second division of men's football in the ACT, coinciding with the introduction of the National Premier Leagues (NPL) as the overhauled top divisions nationwide. The revamped second division was named the Capital League. Queanbeyan City was a founding member of the Capital League, which in 2013 consisted of two groups of six teams. The Lions finished its maiden Capital League season as runner-up in group B, qualifying for the finals series. City beat Lanyon United 3–0 in the quarter finals and then White Eagles 3–2 in the semi-finals before losing to Narrabundah 3–5 on penalties in the grand final.

February 2016, Queanbeyan City, Queanbeyan's longest running football club, celebrated its fifty-year anniversary with a gala night and a mini football tournament attended by City along with clubs from Sydney, southern NSW and the ACT.

== Club identity ==
=== Macedonian Heritage ===
Queanbeyan City was established by the local Macedonian community with Macedonian players, staff and members comprising the majority of the club. QCFC has participated regularly in the national annual Macedonian cup tournament, the Maso Cup, with other clubs around Australia with links to Macedonia including Broadmeadow Magic, Altona Magic and Wollongong United among others.

=== Colours and crest ===
The Lions colours of red, yellow and black draw inspiration from the club's Macedonian heritage.

=== Club name ===
The club was founded as Queanbeyan Makedonia in 1966 by the local Macedonian community which settled in Queanbeyan. After three years the club name was updated to Queanbeyan Macedonia in 1969. Finally, in 1973 the club changed its name to Queanbeyan City, which it has retained as its name since that point.

Club Name Changes
Name	Dates
Queanbeyan Makedonia	1966–1968
Queanbeyan Macedonia	1969–1972
Queanbeyan City	1973–present

=== Junior Program ===
Queanbeyan City run an extensive junior and youth program with boys and girls teams ranging from miniroos (u5s to u10) to juniors (u12 – u18s).

== Current squad ==
Note: Flags indicate national team as defined under FIFA eligibility rules; some limited exceptions apply. Players may hold more than one non-FIFA nationality.

No.	Pos.	Nation	Player
—	FW	ARG	Nico Abot
—	FW	AUS	Misko Naumoski
—	MF	CHI	Bruno Herrera
19	MF	AUS	Domenic Giampaolo
3	DF	AUS	Armani LaVella
55	DF	AUS	Charlie Rae
23	DF	AUS	Vasko Petrovski
7	FW	AUS	Harison Palić
45	DF	AUS	Jack Leverett

No.	Pos.	Nation	Player
10	FW	AUS	Xavi Bonnett
18	FW	AUS	Seth Bonnett
21	MF	AUS	Kristian Tokić
5	DF	AUS	Dylan Colbertaldo
30	MF	AUS	Daniel Mukevski
1	GK	AUS	Nicholas Middleton
9	FW	AUS	Thomas Blazevski
12	FW	AUS	Michael Galić

== Honours ==
- ACT NPL League Premiers and Finals Champions

Premiers (0):
Runner-up (2): 1969, 1970
Champions (0): 1969 Final was abandoned due to fighting after 80 mins with Queanbeyan 2–1 up over Olympic at the time. Cup was not awarded.

- ACT Capital League Premiers and Finals Champions
  - Capital Premier League

Premiers (7): 1973, 1978, 1988, 1993, 1995, 2006, 2024
Runner-up (6): 1991, 2005, 2010, 2012, 2013, 2023
Champions (7): 1978, 1990, 1995, 2006, 2010, 2018, 2024
Runner-up (4): 2005, 2012, 2013, 2016

- Capital Football Federation Cup

Winners (1): 1969

== Season-by-season results ==
The below table is updated with the statistics and final results for Queanbeyan City FC following the conclusion of each ACT Capital League season.

Queanbeyan City Season-by-Season Results
Season	GP	W	D	L	GF	GA	GD	PTS	League	Finals
2013	14	10	2	2	41	28	+13	32	Runner-up	Runner-up
2014	18	9	4	5	38	25	+13	31	4th	Lost semi-final
2015	16	4	5	7	20	31	−11	17	6th	Did not qualify
2016	17	9	3	5	48	31	+17	30	3rd	Runner-up
2017	18	5	1	12	18	40	−22	16	7th	Did not qualify

== See also ==
- Macedonian Australians
- Soccer in the Australian Capital Territory
