= Alex Malauulu =

Samoan footballer (born 2006)

Personal information
- Full name: Alex Junior Isaiah Malauulu
- Date of birth: 12 March 2006 (age 20)
- Place of birth: Australia
- Position: Midfielder

Team information
- Current team: Gungahlin United

Senior career*
Years	Team	Apps	(Gls)
2022	Monaro Panthers	0	(0)
2023	Canberra Croatia	1	(0)
2024–2025	Club Atlético San Jorge		
2025	Canberra White Eagles	3	(0)
2025	Gungahlin United	10	(1)
2025–	Canberra White Eagles	0	(0)

International career
2023–	Samoa	2	(0)
- * Club domestic league appearances and goals

Alex Junior Isaiah Malauulu (born 12 March 2006) is a footballer who plays as a midfielder for Gungahlin United. Born in Australia, he is a Samoa international.

== Early life ==
Malauulu was born in 2006 in Australia. He was born to Samoan parents.

== Career ==
Malauulu is a Samoa international. He played for the Samoa national football team at the 2024 OFC Men's Nations Cup.

== Style of play ==
Malauulu mainly operates as a midfielder. He specifically operates as a defensive midfielder.
