= 2013 Capital Football season =

(Australian Capital Territory) Capital Football
- Season: 2013
- Champions: Canberra Olympic
- Cup winners: Tuggeranong United
- Premiers: Canberra FC

The 2013 Capital Football season was the first season under the new competition format in the Australian Capital Territory. The competition consisted of two divisions across the ACT, created from the teams in the previous structure. The overall premier for the new structure qualified for the National Premier Leagues finals series, competing with the other state federation champions in a final knockout tournament to decide the National Premier Leagues Champion for 2013.

== League Tables ==
=== 2013 National Premier League ACT ===
(Australian Capital Territory) NPL Capital Football
- Season: 2013
- Champions: Canberra Olympic
- Premiers: Canberra FC
- Matches: 100
- Goals: 392 (3.92 per match)
- Top goalscorer: Derek Oelmann (29 goals)
- Biggest home win: 9 goals (3 times)
- Biggest away win: 0–8; Monaro Panthers vs. Canberra City; 29 August 2013
- Highest scoring: 3–7; Cooma vs. Woden Valley; 23 June 2013

The 2013 National Premier League ACT season was played over 25 rounds, from March to August 2013.

Pos	Team	Pld	W	D	L	GF	GA	GD	Pts	Qualification or relegation
1	Canberra	23	18	0	5	86	22	+64	54	Qualified for the 2013 National Premier Leagues Finals
2	Belconnen United	23	15	2	6	49	33	+16	47	Qualified for the 2013 ACT Finals
3	Canberra Olympic (C)	23	13	6	4	47	25	+22	45	Qualified for the 2013 ACT Finals
4	Woden Valley	23	13	2	8	58	45	+13	41	Qualified for the 2013 ACT Finals
5	Cooma Tigers	23	10	1	12	46	54	−8	31	
6	Australian Institute of Sport	16	7	3	6	28	26	+2	24	
7	Canberra City	23	6	1	16	41	61	−20	19	
8	Monaro Panthers	23	6	1	16	30	78	−48	19	
9	Tuggeranong United	23	3	2	18	30	71	−41	11	

Source: sportingpulse.com
Rules for classification: 1) points; 2) goal difference; 3) number of goals scored.
(C) Champions

==== Finals ====
Semifinals
1	Canberra FC	4
2	Belconnen United	0
3	Canberra Olympic	3
4	Woden Valley	1

Preliminary final
2	Belconnen United	2
3	Canberra Olympic	4

Grand final
1	Canberra FC	0
3	Canberra Olympic	2

=== 2013 ACT Capital League ===
(Australian Capital Territory) Capital League
- Season: 2013
- Champions: Narrabundah FC
- Premiers: White Eagles (Pool A); Narrabundah FC (Pool B)
- Matches: 80
- Goals: 350 (4.38 per match)
- Top goalscorer: Chase Deans; Dejan Santrac; Kenneth Macdonald (12 goals)
- Biggest home win: 11–1; ANU FC vs. Belnorth; 10 August 2013; ANU FC vs. UC Pumas; 24 August 2013
- Biggest away win: 0–6; Belnorth vs. White Eagles; 17 August 2013
- Highest scoring: 11–1; ANU FC vs. Belnorth; 10 August 2013; ANU FC vs. UC Pumas; 24 August 2013

The 2013 ACT Capital League was the first edition of the new Capital League as the second level domestic association football competition in the ACT. 12 teams competed, all playing each team in their pool twice and the other pool once for a total of 16 rounds. Canberra FC B withdrew during the season, leaving Pool B with only five teams.

==== Pool A ====
Pos	Team	Pld	W	D	L	GF	GA	GD	Pts	Qualification or relegation
1	White Eagles	15	12	3	0	51	8	+43	39	Qualified for the 2013 ACT Capital League Finals
2	ANU FC	15	7	2	6	51	32	+19	23	Qualified for the 2013 ACT Capital League Finals
3	O'Connor Knights	15	6	3	6	38	38	0	21	Qualified for the 2013 ACT Capital League Finals
4	ADFA Vikings	15	6	3	6	33	33	0	21	Qualified for the 2013 ACT Capital League Finals
5	Weston Molonglo	15	4	2	9	21	31	−10	14	
6	Belnorth (R)	15	1	0	14	14	57	−43	3	Withdrew at end of season

Source: sportstg.com
(R) Relegated

==== Pool B ====
Pos	Team	Pld	W	D	L	GF	GA	GD	Pts	Qualification or relegation
1	Narrabundah (C)	14	9	5	0	33	19	+14	32	Qualified for the 2013 ACT Capital League Finals
2	Queanbeyan City	14	10	2	2	41	28	+13	32	Qualified for the 2013 ACT Capital League Finals
3	Lanyon United	14	4	3	7	22	26	−4	15	Qualified for the 2013 ACT Capital League Finals
4	UC Pumas	14	3	5	6	22	41	−19	14	Qualified for the 2013 ACT Capital League Finals
5	Belconnen United B	14	3	2	9	25	37	−12	11	
6	Canberra FC B (R)	0	0	0	0	0	0	0	0	Disbanded during season

Source: sportstg.com
(C) Champions; (R) Relegated

==== Finals ====
Quarter-finals
A1	White Eagles	1
A4	ADFA Vikings	0
B2	Queanbeyan City	3
B3	Lanyon United	0
B1	Narrabundah	4
B4	UC Pumas FC	0
A2	ANU FC	2
A3	O'Connor Knights	3

Semi-finals
A1	White Eagles	2
B2	Queanbeyan City	3
B1	Narrabundah	4
A3	O'Connor Knights	0

Final
B2	Queanbeyan City	0 (3)
B1	Narrabundah (p)	0 (5)

=== 2013 Capital Football Division 2 ===
(Australian Capital Territory) Capital Football Division 2
- Season: 2013
- Champions: Canberra Olympic B
- Premiers: Canberra Olympic B (Pool A); Belconnen United C (Pool B)
- Matches: 96
- Goals: 414 (4.31 per match)
- Top goalscorer: Danny Krajacic (22 goals)
- Biggest home win: 7 goals (2 times)
- Biggest away win: 0–6; Canberra City B vs. Canberra Olympic B 27 July 2013
- Highest scoring: 10 goals (2 times)

The 2013 ACT Capital Football Division 2 was the first edition of the new Capital League Division 2 as the third level domestic association football competition in the ACT. 12 teams competed, all playing each team in their pool twice and the other pool once for a total of 16 rounds.

==== Pool A ====
Pos	Team	Pld	W	D	L	GF	GA	GD	Pts	Qualification or relegation
1	Canberra Olympic B (C)	16	11	2	3	53	21	+32	35	Qualified for the 2013 ACT Capital Football Division 2 Finals
2	Weston Molonglo B	16	10	2	4	37	28	+9	32	Qualified for the 2013 ACT Capital Football Division 2 Finals
3	ANU FC B	16	9	2	5	56	28	+28	29	Qualified for the 2013 ACT Capital Football Division 2 Finals
4	White Eagles B	16	4	4	8	26	44	−18	16	Qualified for the 2013 ACT Capital Football Division 2 Finals
5	Burns FC	16	3	4	9	14	30	−16	13	
6	Canberra City B	16	3	1	12	13	42	−29	10	

Source: sportstg.com
(C) Champions

==== Pool B ====
Pos	Team	Pld	W	D	L	GF	GA	GD	Pts	Qualification or relegation
1	Belconnen United C	16	13	1	2	64	28	+36	40	Qualified for the 2013 ACT Capital Football Division 2 Finals
2	Queanbeyan City B	16	9	1	6	39	32	+7	28	Qualified for the 2013 ACT Capital Football Division 2 Finals
3	Monaro Panthers B	16	7	3	6	32	32	0	24	Qualified for the 2013 ACT Capital Football Division 2 Finals
4	UC Pumas B	16	6	1	9	26	44	−18	19	Qualified for the 2013 ACT Capital Football Division 2 Finals
5	Narrabundah B	16	6	0	10	27	44	−17	18	
6	Tuggeranong United B	16	3	3	10	27	41	−14	12	

Source: sportstg.com

==== Finals ====
Quarter-finals
A1	Canberra Olympic B	3
A4	White Eagles B	0
B2	Queanbeyan City B	1
B3	Monaro Panthers B	2
B1	Belconnen United C	3
B4	UC Pumas B	0
A2	Weston Molongo B	0
A3	ANU FC B	4

Semi-finals
A1	Canberra Olympic B	2
B3	Monaro Panthers B	1
B1	Belconnen United C	1
A3	ANU FC B	2

Final
A1	Canberra Olympic B	3
A3	ANU FC B	2

=== 2013 Women's Premier League ===
(Australian Capital Territory) Capital Football Women's Premier League
- Season: 2013
- Champions: Belconnen United
- Premiers: Belconnen United
- Matches: 84
- Goals: 349 (4.15 per match)
- Top goalscorer: Michelle Heyman (25 goals)
- Biggest home win: 9–0; Belconnen United vs. Canberra Olympic; 28 April 2013
- Biggest away win: 1–8; Canberra Olympic vs. Canberra FC; 5 May 2013
- Highest scoring: 5–6; Tuggeranong United vs. Monaro Panthers; 14 April 2013

Pos	Team	Pld	W	D	L	GF	GA	GD	Pts	Qualification or relegation
1	Belconnen United (C)	21	21	0	0	94	12	+82	63	2013 Capital Football WPL Finals
2	Monaro Panthers	21	13	3	5	53	30	+23	42	2013 Capital Football WPL Finals
3	Weston Molonglo	21	13	2	6	50	28	+22	41	2013 Capital Football WPL Finals
4	Canberra	21	13	1	7	50	24	+26	40	2013 Capital Football WPL Finals
5	Canberra Olympic	21	8	4	9	36	55	−19	28	
6	Tuggeranong United	21	7	2	12	36	59	−23	23	
7	ANU FC	21	2	0	19	15	73	−58	6	
8	Woden Valley	21	1	0	20	15	68	−53	3	

Source: sportstg.com
Rules for classification: 1) points; 2) goal difference; 3) number of goals scored.
(C) Champions

==== Finals ====
Semi-finals
1	Belconnen United	2
2	Monaro Panthers	1
3	Weston Molonglo	0
4	Canberra FC	4

Preliminary Final
Monaro Panthers	1
Canberra FC	0

Grand Final
Belconnen United	2
Monaro Panthers	0

== Cup Competitions ==
=== 2013 Federation Cup ===
(Australian Capital Territory) 2013 Federation Cup
- Dates: 6 April – 28 August 2013

Final positions
- Champions: Tuggeranong United (4th title)
- Runners-up: Cooma Tigers

2013 was the 51st edition of the Capital Football Federation Cup. In 2013, the Federation Cup, which is open to all senior men's teams registered with Capital Football, consisted of three rounds, quarter-finals, semi-finals and a final. NPL clubs entered the tournament in the third round. The Cup ran from 6 April 2013 (first round) till 28 August 2013 (final). Tuggeranong United clinched the 2013 Cup with a 3–2 victory in extra time over Cooma Tigers. Although not originally intended, the 2013 Federation Cup became the qualifying tournament to determine the FFA Cup ACT representative for the inaugural 2014 FFA Cup after holders Tuggeranong lodged a successful official appeal, supported by the other NPL clubs, to Capital Football in early 2014.

== See also ==
- Soccer in the Australian Capital Territory
- Sport in the Australian Capital Territory
