= Narrabundah FC =

- Full name: Narrabundah Football Club
- Nicknames: The Bulls, Bullcows, NFC
- Founded: 1976
- Ground: Jerrabomberra Oval a.k.a. Narrabundah 2
- Capacity: 500
- President: Peter Blyton
- Manager: Jake Lee
- League: NPL Capital Football 2
- 2021: withdrew (note 2021 season cancelled)
- Website: http://www.nfc.org.au/
Home colours	Away colours

Narrabundah FC is an Australian community soccer club based in the suburb of Narrabundah in the central-south of Canberra, Australian Capital Territory. The club was founded in 1976, and currently competes in the ACT NPL2 and State League. Narrabundah FC has teams within both Men's and Women's competitions.

== History ==
Narrabundah Football club was founded in 1976 as Melrose - Narrabundah by the local Spanish community of Canberra. The club came into existence after a merger of two teams represented by the then large migrant Spanish community in the area, Woden Iberia SC and Melrose-Lyons SC. The newly formed club catered for both senior and junior soccer and was heavily supported by Spanish-Australian Club, also located in Narrabundah. The name Melrose - Narrabundah only lasted two seasons before a change to Narrabundah Soccer Club occurred.

=== ACT top flight ===
Narrabundah competed in the top flight of ACT football for twelve years from the club's inception in 1976 till 1987. During this time the club enjoyed its best period between 1981 and 1983 when the Bulls finished runner-up in the league on two occasions, 1981 and 1983, and made the grand final in 1981.

28 March 1976, Narrabundah kicked off its inaugural season with a 1–6 loss to league heavyweights Canberra Deakin (now Canberra FC). The Bulls did recover throughout the season to finish fifth and qualify for the finals series. In the finals series, Narrabundah met Downer Olympic (now Canberra Olympic) in the qualifying final on 5 September 1976. Narrabundah lost the qualifying final match 2–0, thus ending its finals series, which was eventually won by West Woden Juventus.

In 1981, the ACT Division One was played in three stages. Stage one all fourteen teams played each other for thirteen matches. The league was then split into a Championship play-off league, knows as Division 1, consisting of the top eight clubs and the bottom six Division 2 for stage two. Finally, stage three, the finals series, known at the time for sponsorship reasons as Ampol Cup Finals Series, was contested by the top four teams. Narrabundah finished the first stage in third place, qualifying the club for the championship play-off league. The Bulls finished the second stage as runner-up to league premier Luso by three points thanks to an inferior away form record that saw the club lose three games away from home. Narrabundah qualified for the third vs fourth semi-final in the Ampol Cup Finals Series where they met Canberra United on Sunday 20 September 1981. Narrabundah easily dispatched their semi-final opponents with a convincing 4–0 victory to advance to the grand final. The Bulls, playing in their first grand final in the club's history, faced league premiers Luso in the 1981 grand final on Sunday 27 September. However, Narrabundah finished second best as Luso claimed the Championship title with a 1–0 victory.

In 1983, Narrabundah once again finished runner up in the league, this time the league was split into two conferences, City and Country, with Narrabundah placed in the City conference. In what was a short season format, the Bulls finished second in the City conference behind Kambah United (now Tuggeranong United) by one point. Narrabundah pipped Concordia Phillip to second place thanks to a superior attack with fifty-one goals scored compared to thirty-nine. Both clubs finished on eighteen points and had identical goal differences of plus twenty-two. However, because of the league format, Narrabundah did not qualify for finals as the top club from each conference qualified for the grand final directly.

In 1987, Narrabundah experienced a torrid season when the club failed to win a single match and ended the season with fourteen losses from fourteen matches, placing the club last in the eight team competition. The Bulls only managed to score ten goals all season and conceded seventy-three giving the club a goal difference of minus sixty-three.

In 1988, the club did not submit to compete in ACT senior men's leagues, thus ending the club's participation in the ACT top flight.

=== Wilderness years ===
The club essentially ceased to exist in competitive football between 1988 and 2002 with only a brief revival in 1994–96. Narrabundah SC did continue to host and compete in community based tournaments during this period including the Spanish Cup (Copa de la Hispanidad), an annual tournament for Australian Spanish community clubs celebrating Spanish National day on 12 October, the Teletón Cup, an annual 6-a-side tournament, the Veterans Shield and Canberra's ‘Mini World Cup’.

=== Return to ACT competition ===
In 2002, a group of football enthusiasts approached former president, Mr Roger Arguero, with a re-establishment plan and new governance model to reprise the club successfully and the new Narrabundah Football Club was formed. The Club returned to competitive action in April 2003 in the ACT State League Division 4 and 5. Narrabundah went on to win the division 4 premiership in 2003 with a superior goal difference over Woden Valley however Woden won the grand final over Narrabundah with a 5–3 victory.

=== ACT Capital League ===
Narrabundah were a founding member of the ACT Capital League in 2013. The league was set up by Capital Football as an ACT second tier men's competition behind the NPL Capital Football top-tier league as part of its state league restructuring following the introduction of the NPL by FFA and the state federations.

Narrabundah started the 2013 season with an indifferent 2–2 draw with UCU Pumas but soon found themselves on top of Pool B in the split league structure after winning their next four matches. By the end of the regular season Narrabundah finished top of Pool B with an undefeated record, nine wins; five draws; zero losses from fourteen matches. The Bulls met UCU Pumas in the quarter finals but this time defeated them 4–0 at Hackett Enclosed. Advancing to the semi-finals, Narrabundah took on Pool A third-place finishers, O'Connor Knights. The Bulls put in another convincing display and to earn a 4–0 victory at Kaleen Enclosed and advance to the grand final. 14 September 2013, Narrabundah FC met Queanbeyan City at Hawker Football Centre for the inaugural ACT Capital League grand final. The match was tightly contested between the two sides as the scores finished level at 0–0 at full time. Extra time was played and again no one could find an opening that sent the match into penalty kicks. Narrabundah won the penalty shoot-out 5–3 to clinch the trophy and claim the title. The first title in the club's history.

== Current squad ==
As of 20 March 2017

Note: Flags indicate national team as defined under FIFA eligibility rules; some limited exceptions apply. Players may hold more than one non-FIFA nationality.

No.	Pos.	Nation	Player
1	GK	GRE	Matt Constinopoulos
2	CB	CAN	Will Sikma
3	CB	NOR	Sven Norgaardsen
4	CB	AUS	Ryan Hall
5	FB	AUS	Peter Fitzpatrick
6	FB	AUS	Phil Maxwell
7	FB	RUS	Islam Abdurimov
8	CM	ENG	Bailey Wright
9	CM	AUS	Barry Thomson

No.	Pos.	Nation	Player
10	CAM	AUS	Tristan Johns
11	ST	GHA	Mohammad Owusu
12	RW	KOR	KIM SOON YANG
13	LW	AUS	Jake Murray
14	CM	GEO	Shikmak Kramatskilimov
15	ST	AUS	Erik Thomas
16	RW	USA	Carter Belair

== Coaching staff ==
As of 14 February 2017

2016 Coaching Staff
Elite Coaches
Team	Name	Team	Name
CL	(Australia) Jon Zalunardo	CLR	(Australia) Kik Exposito (Australia) Scot Bricknell
State League Coaches
Div3	(Australia) Andrew Shaw	Div4	(Australia) Rob Ang

== Honours ==
- ACT Capital League Premiers and Finals Champions

Premiers (1): 2013
Champions (1): 2013
Champions (1): 2022

== Season-by-season results ==
The below table is updated with the statistics and final results for Narrabundah FC following the conclusion of each ACT Capital League season.

Champions	Runners-up	Third Place

Narrabundah's Season-by-Season Results
Ref	Season	ACT Capital League										Fed Cup	FFA Cup	Top scorer	
Ref	Season	GP	W	D	L	GF	GA	GD	PTS	League	Finals	Fed Cup	FFA Cup	Name	Goals
	2013	14	9	5	0	33	19	+14	32	1st (Pool B)	Champions	2R	-	Kenneth Macdonald	12
	2014	18	5	6	7	34	28	+6	21	7th	-	2R	-	Liam Boyle	8
	2015	16	5	4	7	26	26	+0	19	5th	-	2R	-	Liam Boyle	6
	2016	17	4	5	8	25	32	-7	17	6th	-	2R	-	Kenneth Macdonald	7
	2017	18	5	2	11	32	46	-14	17	6th	-	1R	-	Liam Boyle	9
	2018	18	4	3	11	20	45	-25	15	8th	-	1R	-	Nathan Duck	9
