= 2014 Capital Football season =

The 2014 Capital Football season was the second season under the new competition format in the Australian Capital Territory. The competition consisted of two divisions across the ACT. The overall premier for the new structure qualified for the National Premier Leagues finals series, competing with the other state federation champions in a final knockout tournament to decide the National Premier Leagues Champion for 2014.

== 2014 National Premier Leagues Capital Football ==
(Australian Capital Territory) NPL Capital Football
- Season: 2014
- Champions: Belconnen United
- Premiers: Cooma Tigers
- Matches: 64
- Goals: 322 (5.03 per match)
- Top goalscorer: Mark Shields (15 goals)
- Biggest home win: 7–0; Canberra FC vs Tuggeranong United; 27 April 2014
- Biggest away win: 1–10; Monaro Panthers vs Belconnen United; 8 June 2014
- Highest scoring: 11 goals 1–10; Monaro Panthers vs Belconnen United; 8 June 2014

The 2014 National Premier League ACT season was played over 18 rounds, beginning on 4 March with the regular season concluding on 24 August 2014.

=== League table ===
Pos	Team	Pld	W	D	L	GF	GA	GD	Pts	Qualification or relegation
1	Cooma	16	13	1	2	54	17	+37	40	2014 National Premier Leagues Finals
2	Belconnen United (C)	16	11	2	3	53	24	+29	35	2014 ACT Finals
3	Canberra Olympic	16	8	3	5	41	28	+13	27	2014 ACT Finals
4	Canberra	16	8	1	7	51	28	+23	25	2014 ACT Finals
5	FFA Centre of Excellence	16	7	1	8	35	39	−4	22	
6	Tuggeranong United	16	6	0	10	26	45	−19	18	
7	Woden Valley	16	5	2	9	20	32	−12	17	
8	Monaro Panthers	16	4	2	10	26	59	−33	14	
9	Canberra City (R)	16	3	2	11	16	50	−34	11	Relegated to the 2015 ACT Division 1

Source: foxsportspulse.com
Rules for classification: 1) points; 2) goal difference; 3) number of goals scored.
(C) Champion; (R) Relegated.

=== Results ===
Home \ Away	BEL	CFC	CCY	CBO	COO	MON	TUG	WNW
Belconnen United		2–2	1–1	1–1	0–1	5–2	3–1	2–0
Canberra	2–0		1–1	1–3	2–3	0–3	7–0	2–1
Canberra City	1–7	0–2		4–2	2–2	2–5	3–1	1–1
Canberra Olympic	2–2	0–2	3–3		4–1	6–1	1–1	2–2
Cooma Tigers	1–2	2–2	0–1	1–2		0–1	4–0	3–0
Monaro Panthers	3–0	1–1	2–0	1–1	3–0		1–0	1–1
Tuggeranong United	0–1	0–1	1–0	0–1	1–2	0–1		1–3
Woden-Weston	3–3	0–1	3–0	0–1	1–3	3–2	3–6	

Updated to match(es) played on unknown. Source:
Colours: Blue = home team win; Yellow = draw; Red = away team win.
For upcoming matches, an "a" indicates there is an article about the rivalry between the two participants.

=== Finals ===
Semi-finals
1	Cooma	0
2	Belconnen United	6
3	Canberra Olympic	2
4	Canberra FC	3

Preliminary Final
1	Cooma	0
4	Canberra FC	3

Grand Final
2	Belconnen United	3 (3)
4	Canberra FC	3 (2)

=== Season statistics ===
==== Scoring ====
===== Top goalscorers =====
Rank	Player	Club	Goals
1	Mark Shields	Canberra Olympic	15
2	Alex Oloriegbe	Canberra	14
2	Jason Ugrinic	Belconnen United	14
4	Daniel Bennett	Canberra	12
4	Stephen Domenici	Cooma Tigers	12
6	Goran Josifovski	Cooma Tigers	9
6	Robert Cattanach	Cooma Tigers	9
8	Dustin Wells	Belconnen United	8
8	Goran Mukevski	Belconnen United	8
8	Tom McLachlan	Belconnen United	8

== 2014 Capital Football Division 1 ==
(Australian Capital Territory) Capital League
- Season: 2014
- Champions: Weston Molonglo
- Premiers: ANU FC
- Matches: 90
- Goals: 351 (3.9 per match)
- Top goalscorer: Danny Krajacic (18 goals)
- Biggest home win: 7 goals (3 times)
- Biggest away win: 0–9; Tuggeranong United B vs. Narrabundah FC; 21 June 2014
- Highest scoring: 9 goals (3 times)

The 2014 Capital Football Division 1 was the second edition of the new Capital League as the second level domestic association football competition in the ACT. 10 teams competed, all playing each team in their pool twice for a total of 18 rounds.

=== League table ===
Pos	Team	Pld	W	D	L	GF	GA	GD	Pts	Qualification or relegation
1	ANU FC	18	12	4	2	59	16	+43	40	2014 ACT Capital League Finals
2	White Eagles	18	12	3	3	44	22	+22	39	2014 ACT Capital League Finals
3	Weston Molonglo (C)	18	10	3	5	39	21	+18	33	2014 ACT Capital League Finals
4	Queanbeyan City	18	9	4	5	38	25	+13	31	2014 ACT Capital League Finals
5	O'Connor Knights	18	7	7	4	40	29	+11	28	
6	ADFA Vikings	18	7	3	8	33	38	−5	24	
7	Narrabundah	18	5	6	7	34	28	+6	21	
8	Lanyon United	18	5	4	9	31	47	−16	19	
9	Belconnen United B	18	4	2	12	24	52	−28	14	
10	Tuggeranong United B	18	1	0	17	9	73	−64	3	

Source: sportstg.com
Rules for classification: 1) points; 2) goal difference; 3) number of goals scored.
(C) Champion.

=== Finals ===
Semi-finals
1	ANU FC	3
2	Canberra White Eagles	0
3	Weston Molonglo	3
4	Queanbeyan City	0

Preliminary Final
2	Canberra White Eagles	0
3	Weston Molonglo	3

Grand Final
1	ANU FC	0
3	Weston Molonglo	2

== 2014 Capital Football Division 2 ==
(Australian Capital Territory) Capital Football Division 2
- Season: 2014
- Champions: Monaro Panthers B
- Premiers: Monaro Panthers B
- Matches: 90
- Goals: 431 (4.79 per match)
- Top goalscorer: Pasquale Perre (22 goals)
- Biggest home win: 15–0; ANU FC B vs. ADFA Vikings B 21 June 2014
- Biggest away win: 0–8; ADFA Vikings B vs. ANU FC B 12 April 2014
- Highest scoring: 15–0; ANU FC B vs. ADFA Vikings B 21 June 2014

The 2014 ACT Capital Football Division 2 was the second edition of the new Capital League Division 2 as the third level domestic association football competition in the ACT. 10 teams competed, all playing each team twice for a total of 18 rounds.

=== League table ===
Pos	Team	Pld	W	D	L	GF	GA	GD	Pts	Qualification or relegation
1	Monaro Panthers B (C)	18	16	1	1	90	22	+68	49	2014 ACT Capital Football Division 2 Finals
2	ANU FC B	18	16	0	2	84	17	+67	48	2014 ACT Capital Football Division 2 Finals
3	Belconnen United C	18	12	2	4	62	27	+35	38	2014 ACT Capital Football Division 2 Finals
4	Canberra Olympic B	18	12	2	4	54	23	+31	38	2014 ACT Capital Football Division 2 Finals
5	Weston Molonglo B	18	10	1	7	40	29	+11	31	
6	Narrabundah B	18	6	2	10	25	34	−9	20	
7	O'Connor Knights B	18	4	4	10	16	48	−32	16	
8	ADFA Vikings B	18	2	3	13	21	98	−77	9	
9	White Eagles B	18	2	1	15	17	63	−46	7	
10	Lanyon United B	18	0	4	14	16	62	−46	4	

Source: sportstg.com
Rules for classification: 1) points; 2) goal difference; 3) number of goals scored.
(C) Champion.

=== Finals ===
Semi-finals
1	Monaro Panthers B	4
2	ANU FC B	0
3	Belconnen United C	0 (0)
4	Canberra Olympic B (p)	0 (3)

Preliminary Final
2	ANU FC B	1
4	Canberra Olympic B	2

Grand Final
1	Monaro Panthers B	2
4	Canberra Olympic B	1

== 2014 Federation Cup ==
(Australian Capital Territory) 2014 Federation Cup
- Dates: 10 April – 3 July 2014

Final positions
- Champions: Belconnen United (4th title)
- Runners-up: Canberra FC

2014 was the 52nd edition of the Capital Football Federation Cup. The Cup competition was to act as the preliminary rounds for the FFA Cup in the ACT, with the Cup winner entering the subsequent FFA Cup Round of 32. However, because of an appeal by 2013 winners Tuggeranong United, the winner of the 2014 edition of the Cup did not qualify for the 2014 FFA Cup. The Cup competition was open to all senior men's teams registered with Capital Football, and consisted of two rounds, quarter-finals, semi-finals and a final. NPL clubs entered the tournament in the second round. Belconnen clinched the 2014 Cup with a 3–2 victory over Canberra FC.

=== See also ===
- Soccer in the Australian Capital Territory
- Sport in the Australian Capital Territory
