= O'Connor Knights FC =

O'Connor Knights
- Full name: O'Connor Knights Soccer Club
- Nickname: Knights
- Founded: 1997 (29 years ago)
- Ground: O'Connor Enclosed Oval, O'Connor, ACT
- Capacity: 1,000
- Coordinates: 35°14′31.5″S 149°02′14.5″E
- President: Stipe Radić
- League: NPL Capital Football
- 2026: 8th of 11
- Website: http://oconnorknights.com.au
Home colours	Away colours

O’Connor Knights Soccer Club is an Australian semi-professional soccer club based in the northern Canberra suburb of O'Connor, Australian Capital Territory. Founded in 1997 by North Canberra's Croatian community, the club currently competes in the National Premier Leagues Capital Football ACT. The Knights have won two Federation Cups and secured two ACT second division titles.

== History ==
Founded in 1997 by Canberra's Croatian community in North Canberra, O’Connor Knights is the second soccer club in Canberra with Croatian heritage (alongside Canberra Croatia FC in Deakin). O’Connor Knights previously competed at the top level of ACT soccer between the years of 2004 and 2009 but has spent the majority of its existence in the second division of ACT football.

O’Connor Knights has regularly competed in Croatian Cup (Australia & New Zealand), one of the oldest ethnic soccer tournaments in Australia, founded in 1974. The Knights won the national tournament, which was being hosted by Canberra Deakin, in 2004.

=== Premier League era ===
O’Connor Knights were promoted to the ACT Premier League (division one) for 2004 following the conclusion of the 2003 season. The Knights finished premiers of State League One (division two), beating former NSL club Canberra City to top spot by six points. UCU Pumas finished last in the Premier League in 2003 and were relegated to State League One.

O'Connor finished sixth in the Premier League in its first season in the top flight, missing out on the finals series by five points. The Knights performed better the next season in 2005 when the team finished second in the Premier League, behind Canberra Deakin, and qualified for finals. O'Connor won the major semi-final against Canberra Deakin 2-2 (7-5) on penalties. The two sides met again in the grand final, at Hawker Enclosed, where a fifteen-minute goal to D.Camara secured the championship for Canberra Deakin over O'Connor.

The Knights next qualified for finals in 2007 after the club finished fourth in the league. Saturday 8 September 2007, The Knights faced-off against Canberra Olympic at the Belconnen Soccer Centre (now McKellar Park) in the minor semi-final but lost the match 1–4.

O’Connor Knights backed up the performances of 2007 in 2008 and again finished fourth in the league and qualified for the finals championship. The Knights were defeated in the minor semi-final by Belconnen United 0–3, ending their season.

2009 was the last season O'Connor Knights competed in the top division of ACT soccer, bringing an end to a six-year spell in the top flight that started with promotion in 2004. The club finished the season mid-table in sixth place behind Tuggeranong United in fifth and ahead of ANU FC in seventh, missing out on finals in the process.

=== Return to Second Division ===
Despite relegation no longer being a mechanism between the Premier League and State League One in 2010, the O’Connor Knights registered for the State League One in 2010 rather than retain their position in the ACT Premier League. The Knights finished its first season back in State League One in fourth position in the table and qualified for the finals series, but were defeated in the semi-finals to league premiers White Eagles 3-4 despite a second half comeback.

In 2011, the Knights had a strong regular season, finishing second behind White Eagles and again qualifying for the finals series. On 27 August 2011, O’Connor were defeated in the semi-finals by the same opposition as the previous season (White Eagles) in what proved to be a high scoring affair (2-5) at ANU Willows 1. Despite the loss O’Connor advanced to the preliminary final at Kaleen Enclosed on 3 September 2011. There the Knights were again defeated, this time to ANU FC 0–1.

In 2013, O’Connor Knights were a founding club of the newly renamed and formed Capital League, which Capital Football established to replace the old State League One as the ACT's recognised second division behind the new nationally linked top division, National Premier Leagues Capital Football (NPL Capital Football).

2017, O’Connor Knights finished runner-up in the Capital League for the first time. Five points behind Premiers ANU FC and four points ahead of Weston Molonglo FC in third. O’Connor then defeated ANU in the semi-finals 2-1 thanks to a second half brace of goals to Danny Krajacic to progress to the grand final directly. The Knights faced ANU, who beat Weston Creek in the preliminary final, in the grand final on 3 September 2017 at Woden Park. The two teams finished the first half locked at 1-1 but a second half saw a score blowout to ANU and the university team claimed a 5–1 victory over the Knights by the end of the match.

=== Promotion to NPL 1 ===
O'Connor Knights were promoted to NPL1 in 2021 and Finished 4th in their first year in NPL in 2022

=== NPL 2023 ACT Champions ===
In late 2023 O'Connor Knights claimed the NPL 2023 Championship by a large gap in the table 15 Points clear of 2nd Place Gungahlin United. Decorated Coach Miro Trninić led O'Connor to their first league title since promotion.

== Club identity ==
=== Colours and crest ===
O'Connor Knights badge used on playing kits between 1997 and 2017

O'Connor Knights crest used between 1997 and 2017

O’Connor Knights draws its colour scheme (red, white and blue) inspiration from its Croatian heritage. The red and white checked (chequy) shield represents the Coat of arms of Croatia. The name Knights refers to the importance of knights in Croatian history which is symbolised by the Knight helmet at the heart of the crest and the date of 1997 showcases the year the club was founded.

=== Home ground and facilities ===
Traditionally the Knights have been based out of O’Connor Enclosed but in recent years the Capital League team has been based in the Belconnen suburb of Hawker at the Hawker Football Centre. Hawker Enclosed underwent a large redevelopment in 2009 and was officially re-opened by then ACT Minister of Sport, Andrew Barr, as Hawker Football Centre. The capacity has been increased to around 3,000 people and the all-weather synthetic pitch (Tiger Turf) provides a consistent playing surface and drought proofs the venue.

=== Controversy ===
The club is linked to the Australian Croatian Club in Canberra, which has been accused of supporting the fascist Ustaše regime that controlled Croatia during the Second World War. In September 2023, the club posted a team photo taken at the Australian Croatian Club, with a portrait of Ustaše leader and war criminal Ante Pavelić. Pavelić was responsible for mass genocide within Croatia during the War. The photos were later removed.

== Current squad ==
As of 8 June 2024

Note: Flags indicate national team as defined under FIFA eligibility rules; some limited exceptions apply. Players may hold more than one non-FIFA nationality.

No.	Pos.	Nation	Player
1	GK	AUS	Sebastian Arranz
—	DF	AUS	Jenno Ceruti
—	DF	AUS	Bud Abbas
—	FW	AUS	Michael John
—	DF	AUS	Kyah Milin
—	DF	AUS	Connor Bill
11	FW	AUS	Aiosha Iheghie
—	DF	AUS	Kristian Tokić
13	DF	AUS	Harison Palić
—	DF	AUS	Jasper Milin

No.	Pos.	Nation	Player
—	MF	AUS	Regan Walsh
—	MF	AUS	Daniel Roberts
19	MF	AUS	Lachlan Campbell
—	MF	AUS	Patrick O'Rourke
9	MF	NGR	Michael Adams
—	MF	AUS	Sam Van Dooren
—	MF	AUS	Lachlan Fields
—	MF	AUS	Harry Martin
12	FW	AUS	Niko Kresic
14	FW	AUS	Jackson Paesler
24	FW	AUS	Nikola Perinović
11	FW	AUS	Nicholas Dahl

== Honours ==
- ACT NPL League Premiership
  - Winners (1): 2023
  - Runners-up (1): 2005
- ACT NPL League Championship
  - Runners-up (1): 2023
- ACT NPL 2 Premiership
  - Winners (3): 1999, 2003, 2021
  - Runners-up (3): 2011, 2017, 2019
- ACT NPL 2 Championship
  - Runners-up (4): 1999, 2003, 2017, 2019
- Capital Football Federation Cup
  - Winners (2): 2008, 2024
- Capital Football Charity Shield
  - Winners (2): 2024, 2025
- Croatian Cup (Australia & New Zealand)
  - Winners (1): 2004
- Capital Football Community League 3
  - Premiership (1): 2021

== Season-by-season results ==
The below table is updated with the statistics and final results for O’Connor Knights FC following the conclusion of each ACT State League One season (2002–2003, 2010–2012), ACT Premier League season (2004–2009), ACT Capital League season (2013–18), NPL ACT 2 season (2019–2021) and NPL ACT 1 season (2022 - present):

Champions	Runners-up	Third Place

O’Connor Knights Season-by-Season Results
Ref	Season	Division	Pld	W	D	L	GF	GA	Pts	Pos	Finals	Fed Cup	Australia Cup	Player(s)	Goals
Ref	Season	League										Fed Cup	Australia Cup	League top scorer	
	2002	State League One	18	6	6	6	34	28	24	6th	-	QF	-	-	-
	2003	State League One	18	11	5	2	41	19	38	1st	Runners-up	GS	-	-	-
	2004	Premier League	18	7	2	9	28	30	23	6th	-	QF	-	-	-
	2005	Premier League	18	12	2	4	50	20	38	2nd	Runners-up	QF	-	-	-
	2006	Premier League	16	5	5	6	25	26	20	6th	-	SF	-	-	-
	2007	Premier League	16	7	4	5	27	24	25	4th	SF	GS	-	-	-
	2008	Premier League	16	6	4	6	24	30	22	4th	SF	W	-	-	-
	2009	Premier League	16	3	6	7	25	33	15	6th	-		-	Goran Veljanovski	6
	2010	State League One	18	6	4	8	33	42	22	4th	SF	-	-	-	-
	2011	State League One	18	13	1	4	48	20	40	2nd	PF	-	-	-	-
	2012	State League One	16	7	2	7	28	24	23	6th	-	GS	-	-	-
	2013	Capital League	15	6	3	6	38	38	21	4th	SF	QF	-	Nato White	10
	2014	Capital League	18	7	7	4	40	29	28	5th	-	1R	-	Nato White	15
	2015	Capital League	16	3	4	9	20	43	13	8th	-	1R	-	Nato White	4
	2016	Capital League	17	4	2	11	25	40	14	7th	-	2R	-	Denne McHugh	5
	2017	Capital League	18	11	3	4	53	34	36	2nd	Runner-up	2R	-	Danny Krajacic	18
	2018	Capital League	18	10	3	5	37	24	33	5th	-	QF	-	Jake Wilsener	8
	2019	NPL2	16	11	3	2	44	17	36	2nd	Runner-up	2R	-	Josip Jadric	7
	2020	NPL2	8	3	1	4	20	19	10	6th	-	Cancelled	-	Kynan Dodd	6
	2021	NPL2	16	13	2	1	41	8	41	1st	Cancelled	QF	-	David McCarron	11
	2022	NPL1	21	8	3	10	36	46	27	4th	-	SF	-	-	-
	2023	NPL1	21	16	3	2	57	18	51	1st	Runner-up	2R	-	-	-
	2024	NPL1	21	12	4	5	40	44	34	3rd	SF	W	R32	-	-

== See also ==
- List of Croatian football clubs in Australia
- Australian-Croatian Soccer Tournament
- Croatian Australian
