= Australian National University FC =

ANU FC
- Full name: Australian National University Football Club
- Nickname: The Students
- Short name: ANU FC
- Founded: 1962
- Ground: ANU South Oval; ANU Willows Oval
- Capacity: 200
- Coordinates: 35°16′51″S 149°6′58″E; 35°16′30″S 149°7′21″E
- President: Jonathan Saunders
- League: Capital league Division 1
- 2025: 3rd of 8 (relegated); Capital Premier League
- Website: https://www.anufc.org.au/
Home colours	Away colours

Australian National University Football Club (more commonly known as ANU FC) is an Australian amateur association football club representing the Australian National University based in Acton, Australian Capital Territory. Founded in 1962, the club is inclusive of both current and graduated students and currently competes in the Capital league Division 1.

== History ==
ANU FC was founded by the University in 1962 as ANU Men's Soccer Club. The club was established to provide footballing opportunities, of all levels, to current and former students and staff.

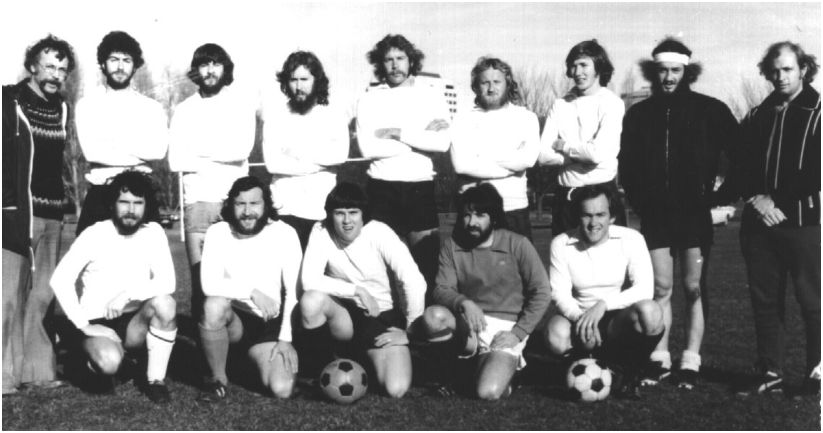
ANU Men's Soccer Club Division 1 team 1975

The Students first grade team has spent the majority of its existence in the ACT second division, becoming one of the most successful clubs at that level with six league premierships and championships to its name.

ANU won its first recorded title in 1974 when it claimed the ACT Division Two premiership by two points ahead of second placed Belconnen United.

In 2002, ANU Men's Soccer Club officially changed its ANU FC at the 2002 Annual General Meeting to reflect a rebranding of sport nationally at the time.

After claiming the 2005 State League One (division two) premiership, ANU FC was promoted to the ACT Premier League (division one) for 2006. The Students finished its first season in the top division of ACT football in seventh place in the league table, behind O’Connor Knights in sixth and ahead of White Eagles in eight.

ANU spent five seasons in the ACT Premier League between 2006 and 2010 with the club's best season coming in 2007 when the Students finished sixth in the league behind Tuggeranong in fifth and ahead of Canberra City in seventh. ANU finished last in the league in both 2008 and 2010 and in 2011 the club's first grade returned to State League One having never qualified for the Premier League finals in its five-year stint.

31 March 2012, ANU celebrated its golden anniversary by marking 50 years of existence with a community day at ANU Willows. Attended by Andrew Barr, Shane Rattenbury, Steve Doszpot, Heather Reid (CF CEO), Rachel Harrigan (CF President) and Mick Brady (SRA), the community day involved a BBQ, fresh coffee, activities and face painting for the kids and the main event, an exhibition match between ANU FC All-Star XI and ANU Ex-Presidents.

In 2013, Capital Football introduced a revamped second division of men's football in the ACT, coinciding with the introduction of the National Premier Leagues (NPL) as the overhauled top divisions nationwide. The revamped second division was named the Capital League. ANU FC was a founding member of the Capital League, which in 2013 consisted of two groups of six teams. The Students finished its maiden Capital League season as league runner-up behind White Eagles, qualifying for the finals series. ANU played O'Connor Knights in the quarter finals and lost the match 2–3, ending its season.

ANU FC has experienced a successful period since the inception of the Capital League in 2013. The Students have claimed three premierships (2014, 2016, 2017) and three straight championships (2015, 2016, 2017) in the first six years of the league revamp. This has included two league and championship doubles in 2016 and 2017.

== Club identity ==
=== Colours, crest and motto ===
The club's primary colours are royal blue and white, with vertical stripes featuring prominently in the shirt's design. The blue comes from the ANU's coat of arms; white is a neutral colour. The club's official third colour worn when shirts clash is orange. Shorts and socks are royal blue. The emblem is a crest with royal blue and white vertical stripes and the motto vilis est sermo (Latin for talk is cheap). The crest features a traditional football positioned above an open book representing the club's academic roots and affiliation with the ANU.

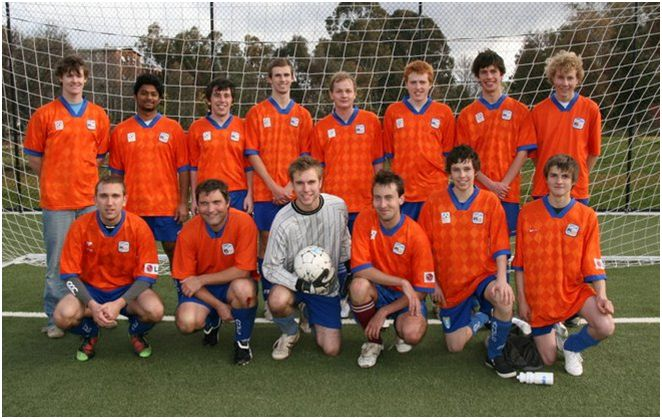
ANU FC team on Willows Oval wearing alternate orange playing strip

=== Membership ===
In order to gain membership to ANU FC a student or graduate must first obtain membership to the ANU Sport & Recreation Association (SRA).

=== Home ground and facilities ===
ANU Willows aerial view

ANU's primary home ground is ANU Willows (previously known as Willows Oval). Its alternate home venue is South Oval.

ANU Willows was named after the long line of willow trees that run alongside the eastern side of the ground towards Sullivans Creek and Toad Hall (ANU). ANU Willows under its previous incarnation was a single patchy grass field, the ground was redeveloped in 2010 (completed 1 December 2010) by the university and ANU Sport & Recreation Association with additional investment sourced by the Commonwealth Government of Australia, who provided a $1 million Green Precincts grant for the project. The redevelopment project consisted of installing two state-of-the-art synthetic sports pitches with Desso Ambition artificial grass and was awarded a FIFA RECOMMENDED 2 Star certificate. The new facility was enclosed with a perimeter fence and also additionally boasts BBQ facilities, toilets and change rooms. To meet the university's environmental management plan, the new facility has a number of environmentally friendly features. The artificial grass is composed of monofilament fibres that do not require watering, saving fifteen megalitres of water per year. The facility also incorporated a 500 kilolitre underground water storage system (Stormtech) that harvests seven and a half million litres of rainwater a year from the two playing fields for re-use in the surrounding landscapes of the campus.

ANU FC's alternative home ground on the ANU campus is South Oval, situated at the corner of Ward and Garren Roads next to the ANU College of Law. South Oval consists of two full-sized natural grass pitches with dressing rooms.

== Players ==
=== Notable former players ===
Below is a list of players who have represented ANU FC at senior or junior level and who have at least one senior or junior international cap for a FIFA sanctioned national team or at least one club cap for a top division national league.

ANU FC Notable Former Players
Name	National/Club Team
(Australia) Tom Rogić	Australian national football team
(Australia) Luke Pilkington	Melbourne Victory (A-League)
(Australia) Jennifer Bisset	Canberra United (W-League)

== Honours ==
- ACT Capital League Premiers and Finals Champions

Premiers (6): 1974, 1996, 2005, 2014, 2016, 2017
Runner-up (8): 1973, 1977, 1989, 1994, 1995, 2004, 2013, 2015
Champions (9): 1987, 1994, 1998, 2000, 2005, 2015, 2016, 2017, 2018
Runner-up (4): 1977, 1996, 2011, 2014

- ACT National Premier Leagues 2

Champions (1): 2019

== Season-by-season results ==
The below table is updated with the statistics and final results for ANU FC following the conclusion of each ACT Capital League and ACT NPL2 season.

Champions	Runners-up	Third Place

ANU FC Season-by-Season Results
Ref	Season	ACT Capital League										Fed Cup	FFA Cup	Top scorer	
Ref	Season	GP	W	D	L	GF	GA	GD	PTS	League	Finals	Fed Cup	FFA Cup	Name	Goals
	2013	15	7	2	6	51	32	+19	23	2nd	QF	2R	-	Chase Deans	12
	2014	18	12	4	2	59	16	+43	40	1st	RU	QF	-	Danny Krajacic	18
	2015	16	10	4	2	48	21	+27	34	2nd	Champions	QF	-	Olaide Yinka-Kehinde	16
	2016	17	12	2	3	48	22	+26	38	1st	Champions	2R	-	Danny Krajacic	16
	2017	18	13	2	3	71	28	+43	41	1st	Champions	2R	-	Andrew Manley	20
	2018	18	10	3	5	53	21	+32	33	4th	Champions	2R	-	Maximillian Mottl	14
		ACT National Premier Leagues 2													
	2019	16	11	1	4	52	13	+39	34	3rd	Champions	SF	-	Rowan Peterkin	13
	2020	8	4	0	4	16	12	+4	12	5th	-	-	-	Chase Deans	7
