= 2016 Capital Football season =

(Australian Capital Territory) Capital Football
- Season: 2016
- Champions: Canberra Olympic
- Cup winners: Canberra Olympic
- Premiers: Canberra Olympic

The 2016 Capital Football season was the fourth season under the new competition format in the Australian Capital Territory. The overall premier for the new structure qualified for the National Premier Leagues finals series, competing with the other state federation champions in a final knockout tournament to decide the National Premier Leagues Champion for 2016.

== League Tables ==
=== 2016 National Premier League ACT ===
(Australian Capital Territory) NPL Capital Football
- Season: 2016
- Champions: Canberra Olympic
- Premiers: Canberra Olympic
- Matches: 90
- Goals: 383 (4.26 per match)
- Top goalscorer: Stephen Domenici (21 goals)
- Biggest home win: 8–1, (2 times)
- Biggest away win: 0–6; Monaro Panthers vs Tigers FC; 24 July 2016
- Highest scoring: 10 goals, (4 times)

The 2016 National Premier League ACT season was played over 18 rounds, from April to August 2016.

Pos	Team	Pld	W	D	L	GF	GA	GD	Pts	Qualification or relegation
1	Canberra Olympic (C)	18	15	0	3	50	16	+34	45	2016 National Premier Leagues Finals
2	Tigers FC	18	13	3	2	61	28	+33	42	2016 ACT Finals
3	Belconnen United	18	11	2	5	49	24	+25	35	2016 ACT Finals
4	Canberra	18	10	2	6	44	31	+13	32	2016 ACT Finals
5	Gungahlin United	18	6	4	8	20	29	−9	22	
6	FFA Centre of Excellence	18	7	1	10	51	48	+3	22	
7	Tuggeranong United	18	6	3	9	26	35	−9	21	
8	Canberra United Academy (R)	18	6	0	12	44	68	−24	18	Disbanded at end of season
9	Monaro Panthers	18	4	2	12	22	49	−27	14	
10	Woden Weston	18	3	1	14	16	55	−39	10	

Source: sportstg.com
Rules for classification: 1) points; 2) goal difference; 3) number of goals scored.
(C) Champions; (R) Relegated

==== Finals ====
Semi-finals
1	Canberra Olympic	2 (5)
2	Tigers FC	2 (3)
3	Belconnen United	0
4	Canberra FC	4

Preliminary Final
2	Tigers FC	1
4	Canberra FC	5

Grand Final
1	Canberra Olympic	3
4	Canberra FC	0

==== Top Scorers ====
Rank	Player	Club	Goals
1	(Australia) Stephen Domenici	Tigers FC	21
2	(England) Thomas James	Canberra FC	18
3	(Colombia) Philippe Bernabo-Madrid	Canberra Olympic	16
4	(Australia) Jason Ugrinic	Belconnen United	13
5	(Australia) Joshua Gulevski	Canberra United Academy	11
6	(Australia) Nicolas Abot	Tigers FC	10
7	(Australia) Domenic Giampaolo	Canberra FC	9
8	(Australia) Aisosa Ihegie	Belconnen United	8
9	(Australia) Andrew Slavich	Tuggeranong United	7
9	(Australia) Dustin Wells	Belconnen United	7

=== 2016 ACT Capital League ===
(Australian Capital Territory) Capital League
- Season: 2016
- Champions: ANU FC
- Premiers: ANU FC
- Matches: 68
- Goals: 275 (4.04 per match)
- Top goalscorer: Daniel Crkovski (17 goals)
- Biggest home win: 6–0 (2 times)
- Biggest away win: 1–7; Weston Molonglo vs Queanbeyan City; 9 April 2016
- Highest scoring: 3–6; Tuggeranong United B vs Canberra Olympic B 30 April 2016

The 2016 ACT Capital League was the fourth edition of the new Capital League as the second level domestic association football competition in the ACT.

Pos	Team	Pld	W	D	L	GF	GA	GD	Pts	Qualification or relegation
1	ANU FC (C)	17	12	2	3	48	22	+26	38	2016 ACT Capital League Finals
2	White Eagles	17	10	1	6	40	25	+15	31	2016 ACT Capital League Finals
3	Queanbeyan City	17	9	3	5	48	31	+17	30	2016 ACT Capital League Finals
4	Canberra Olympic B	17	7	5	5	35	32	+3	26	2016 ACT Capital League Finals
5	Weston Molonglo	17	8	1	8	27	42	−15	25	
6	Narrabundah	17	4	5	8	25	32	−7	17	
7	O'Connor Knights	17	4	2	11	25	40	−15	14	
8	Tuggeranong United B	17	4	1	12	27	51	−24	13	

Source: sportstg.com
Rules for classification: 1) points; 2) goal difference; 3) number of goals scored.
(C) Champions

==== Finals ====
Semi-finals
1	ANU FC	3
2	White Eagles	2
3	Queanbeyan City	2(3)
4	Canberra Olympic B	2(1)

Preliminary Final
White Eagles	0
Queanbeyan City	2

Grand Final
ANU FC	6
Queanbeyan City	3

=== 2016 Capital Football Division 1 ===
(Australian Capital Territory) Capital Football Division 1
- Season: 2016
- Champions: Belconnen United B
- Premiers: ANU FC C
- Matches: 90
- Goals: 395 (4.39 per match)
- Top goalscorer: Daniel Sparrow (14 Goals)

The 2016 ACT Capital Football Division 1 was the second edition of the new Capital League Division 1 as the third level domestic association football competition in the ACT. 10 teams competed, all playing each team twice for a total of 18 rounds.

Pos	Team	Pld	W	D	L	GF	GA	GD	Pts	Qualification or relegation
1	ANU FC C	18	14	1	3	58	28	+30	43	2015 Capital Football Division 1 Finals
2	Belconnen United B (C)	18	12	2	4	57	32	+25	38	2015 Capital Football Division 1 Finals
3	Lanyon United	18	12	1	5	42	29	+13	37	2015 Capital Football Division 1 Finals
4	ADFA Vikings	18	10	3	5	34	24	+10	33	2015 Capital Football Division 1 Finals
5	UC Pumas	18	10	2	6	43	32	+11	32	
6	Brindabella Blues	18	8	3	7	41	33	+8	27	
7	Goulburn Strikers	18	4	5	9	30	40	−10	17	
8	Canberra City	18	3	5	10	38	53	−15	14	
9	Goulburn Stags	18	3	1	14	32	55	−23	10	
10	Belwest Foxes	18	2	1	15	20	69	−49	7	

Source: sportstg.com
Rules for classification: 1) points; 2) goal difference; 3) number of goals scored.
(C) Champions

==== Finals ====
Semi-finals
1	ANU FC C	0
2	Belconnen Utd B	1
3	Lanyon United	2(12)
4	ADFA Vikings	2(13)

Preliminary Final
ANU FC C	0
ADFA Vikings	1

Grand Final
Belconnen Utd B	2
ADFA Vikings	0

=== 2016 Women's Premier League ===
(Australian Capital Territory) Capital Football Women's Premier League
- Season: 2016
- Champions: Belconnen United
- Premiers: Belconnen United
- Matches: 45
- Goals: 226 (5.02 per match)
- Top goalscorer: Brittany Palombi (20 goals)

The highest tier domestic football competition in the ACT is known as the Women's Premier League. The 6 teams played each other three times, plus a finals series for the top 4 teams.

Pos	Team	Pld	W	D	L	GF	GA	GD	Pts	Qualification or relegation
1	Belconnen United (C)	15	14	0	1	67	7	+60	42	2016 Capital Football WPL Finals
2	Canberra	15	9	4	2	45	18	+27	31	2016 Capital Football WPL Finals
3	Gungahlin United	15	9	3	3	55	19	+36	30	2016 Capital Football WPL Finals
4	Tuggeranong United	15	5	0	10	37	40	−3	15	2016 Capital Football WPL Finals
5	Woden Weston	15	4	1	10	19	33	−14	13	
6	Canberra United Academy	15	0	0	15	5	111	−106	0	

Source: sportstg.com
Rules for classification: 1) points; 2) goal difference; 3) number of goals scored.
(C) Champions

==== Finals ====
Semi-finals
1	Belconnen United	4
2	Canberra FC	5
3	Gungahlin United	5
4	Tuggeranong United	0

Preliminary Final
Canberra FC	2
Gungahlin United	0

Grand Final
Belconnen United	1
Canberra FC	0

== Cup Competitions ==
=== 2016 Federation Cup ===
(Australian Capital Territory) 2016 Federation Cup
Tournament details
- Dates: 26 April – 18 June 2016
- Teams: 19

Final positions
- Champions: Canberra Olympic (5th title)
- Runners-up: Tigers FC

Tournament statistics
- Matches played: 18
- Goals scored: 76 (4.22 per match)

2016 was the 54th edition of the Capital Football Federation Cup. The Federation cup acts as the preliminary rounds for the FFA Cup in the ACT with the Cup winner entering the subsequent FFA Cup round of 32. In 2016, the Federation Cup, which is open to all senior men's teams registered with Capital Football, consisted of two rounds, quarter-finals, semi-finals and a final. NPL clubs entered the tournament in the second round. The Cup ran from 26 April 2016 (first round) till 18 June 2016 (final). Olympic defeated Tigers FC in the final 3–1 at Deakin Stadium to clinch the Federation Cup and qualify for the 2016 FFA Cup.

2016 Capital Football Federation Cup
Tie no	Home team (tier)	Score	Away team (tier)
Round 1
1	Lanyon United (4)	1–2	O'Connor Knights (3)
2	Goulburn Stags (4)	2–1	Canberra City (4)
3	Brindabella Blues (4)	6–0	Goulburn Strikers (4)
Round 2
1	Belconnen United (2)	8–1	ANU FC (3)
2	Tigers FC (2)	6–0	Goulburn Stags (4)
3	White Eagles (3)	5–0	Queanbeyan City (3)
4	Tuggeranong United (2)	1–1 (4–1 (p))	Monaro Panthers (2)
5	Narrabundah FC (3)	0–6	Canberra FC (2)
6	Woden Weston (2)	2–0	Brindabella Blues (4)
7	Canberra Olympic (2)	2–2 (4–1 (p))	Gungahlin United (2)
8	Weston-Molonglo (3)	1–0	O'Connor Knights (3)
Quarter-finals
1	Belconnen United (2)	1–1 (4–1 (p))	Canberra FC (2)
2	White Eagles (3)	0–3	Tuggeranong United (2)
3	Woden Weston (2)	0–3	Canberra Olympic (2)
4	Weston-Molonglo (3)	2–5	Tigers FC (2)
Semi-finals
1	Belconnen United (2)	1–4	Canberra Olympic (2)
2	Tigers FC (2)	4–1	Tuggeranong United (2)
Final
1	Canberra Olympic (2)	3–1	Tigers FC (2)

=== 2016 Charity Shield ===
2016 was the first edition of the annual ACT Charity Shield contested to kick off the 2016 Capital Football season. Money raised from the event goes towards a nominated charity, which in 2016 was The House with No Steps. Canberra FC and Gungahlin United contested the Shield in 2016. Canberra FC claimed the inaugural Charity Shield title with a 4–1 victory.

18 March 2016	Canberra FC	4–1	Gungahlin United	Gungahlin, Canberra
18:00	Deeley 5'; Keir 29', 62'; Jadric 72'	Report	Walsh 68'	Stadium: Gungahlin Enclosed Oval

== See also ==
- Soccer in the Australian Capital Territory
- Sport in the Australian Capital Territory
