= 2017 Capital Football season =

(Australian Capital Territory) Capital Football
- Season: 2017
- Champions: Belconnen United
- Cup winners: Canberra Olympic
- Premiers: Canberra Olympic

The 2017 Capital Football season was the fifth season under the new competition format in the Australian Capital Territory. The overall premier for the new structure qualified for the National Premier Leagues finals series, competing with the other state federation champions in a final knockout tournament to decide the National Premier Leagues Champion for 2017.

== League Tables ==
=== 2017 National Premier League ACT ===
(Australian Capital Territory) NPL Capital Football
- Season: 2017
- Champions: Belconnen United
- Premiers: Canberra Olympic
- Matches: 90
- Goals: 378 (4.2 per match)
- Top goalscorer: Stephen Domenici (28 goals)
- Biggest home win: 12–0; FFA Centre of Excellence vs Riverina Rhinos; 5 August 2017
- Biggest away win: 2–8; Woden Weston FC vs Canberra Olympic; 13 May 2017
- Highest scoring: 12 goals (see biggest home win)

The 2017 National Premier League ACT season was played over 18 rounds between April and August 2017.

Pos	Team	Pld	W	D	L	GF	GA	GD	Pts	Qualification or relegation
1	Canberra Olympic	18	15	2	1	66	22	+44	47	2017 National Premier Leagues Finals
2	FFA Centre of Excellence	18	11	3	4	53	17	+36	36	
3	Belconnen United (C)	18	11	1	6	55	24	+31	34	2017 ACT Finals
4	Gungahlin United	18	10	2	6	32	32	0	32	2017 ACT Finals
5	Canberra	18	9	4	5	45	21	+24	31	2017 ACT Finals
6	Tigers FC	18	9	0	9	40	37	+3	27	
7	Tuggeranong United	18	8	2	8	30	34	−4	26	
8	Woden Weston	18	4	2	12	31	52	−21	14	
9	Riverina Rhinos	18	1	4	13	15	71	−56	7	
10	Monaro Panthers	18	1	2	15	11	62	−51	5	

Source: sportstg
Rules for classification: 1) points; 2) goal difference; 3) number of goals scored.
(C) Champions

==== Finals ====
Semi-finals
1	Canberra Olympic	2 (2)
2	Belconnen United (pen.)	2 (4)
3	Gungahlin United	3
4	Canberra FC	0

Preliminary Final
1	Canberra Olympic	2
3	Gungahlin United	0

Grand Final
2	Belconnen United	2
1	Canberra Olympic	1

==== Top Scorers ====
Rank	Player	Club	Goals
1	(Australia) Stephen Domenici	Canberra Olympic	28
2	(Australia) Jason Ugrinic	Belconnen United	22
3	(Australia) Nicolas Abot	Tigers FC	15
4	(Australia) Mirza Muratovic	FFA Centre of Excellence	13
5	(Australia) Daniel Crkovski	Woden-Weston FC	12
6	(England) Thomas James	Tigers FC	12
7	(Australia) Jason O'Dwyer	Gungahlin United	8
8	(Australia) Dustin Wells	Belconnen United	7
9	(Australia) Michael Rinaudo	Gungahlin United	7
10	(Australia) Nikolaos Kalfas	Canberra FC	7

=== 2017 ACT Capital League ===
(Australian Capital Territory) Capital League
- Season: 2017
- Champions: ANU FC
- Premiers: ANU FC
- Matches: 68
- Goals: 317 (4.66 per match)
- Top goalscorer: Andrew Manley (20 goals)
- Biggest home win: 11–1; Weston Molonglo FC vs Tigers FC; 5 August 2017
- Biggest away win: 0–7; Queanbeyan City vs ANU FC; 17 June 2017
- Highest scoring: 12 goals (see biggest home win)

The 2017 ACT Capital League was the fifth edition of the Capital League as the second level domestic association football competition in the ACT. Each team played each other twice for a total of 16 rounds, with the season running from April to September 2017.

Pos	Team	Pld	W	D	L	GF	GA	GD	Pts	Qualification or relegation
1	ANU FC (C)	18	13	2	3	71	28	+43	41	2017 ACT Capital League Finals
2	O'Connor Knights	18	11	3	4	53	34	+19	36	2017 ACT Capital League Finals
3	Weston Molonglo	18	10	2	6	48	31	+17	32	2017 ACT Capital League Finals
4	Canberra Olympic B	18	8	4	6	31	37	−6	28	2017 ACT Capital League Finals
5	White Eagles	18	8	2	8	35	31	+4	26	
6	Narrabundah	18	5	2	11	32	46	−14	17	
7	Queanbeyan City	18	5	1	12	18	40	−22	16	
8	Tigers B	18	3	2	13	29	70	−41	11	

Source: sportstg.com
Rules for classification: 1) points; 2) goal difference; 3) number of goals scored.
(C) Champions

==== Finals ====
Semi-finals
1	ANU FC	1
2	O'Connor Knights	2
3	Weston Molonglo	4
4	Canberra Olympic	1

Preliminary Final
1	ANU FC	5
2	Weston Molonglo	3

Grand Final
1	O'Connor Knights	1
2	ANU FC	5

=== 2017 Capital Football Division 1 ===
(Australian Capital Territory) Capital Football Division 1
- Season: 2017
- Champions: Narrabundah B
- Premiers: Narrabundah B
- Matches: 90
- Goals: 410 (4.56 per match)
- Top goalscorer: Daniel Sparrow, Josh Sands, Michael Salmon (14 goals)
- Biggest home win: 11–1; ANU FC vs Tuggeranong United; 27 May 2017
- Biggest away win: 1–11; Monaro Panthers vs ADFA Vikings; 8 April 2017
- Highest scoring: 12 goals (see biggest home/away win)

The 2017 ACT Capital Football Division 1 was the third edition of the Capital League Division 1 as the third level domestic association football competition in the ACT. Each team played each other twice for a total of 18 rounds, with the season running from April to September 2017.

Pos	Team	Pld	W	D	L	GF	GA	GD	Pts	Qualification or relegation
1	Narrabundah B (C)	16	15	0	1	54	11	+43	45	2017 Capital Football Division 1 Finals
2	UC Pumas	16	13	1	2	47	26	+21	40	2017 Capital Football Division 1 Finals
3	Belconnen United B	16	10	4	2	47	26	+21	34	2017 Capital Football Division 1 Finals
4	ANU FC C	16	8	3	5	42	28	+14	27	2017 Capital Football Division 1 Finals
5	Weston Molonglo B	16	6	4	6	35	32	+3	22	
6	Goulburn Strikers	16	5	5	6	39	35	+4	20	
7	ADFA Vikings	16	5	3	8	38	36	+2	18	
8	Lanyon United	16	5	3	8	31	36	−5	18	
9	Tuggeranong United B	16	4	2	10	34	65	−31	14	
10	Brindabella Blues	16	2	2	12	21	39	−18	8	
11	Monaro Panthers B	16	1	1	14	22	76	−54	4	

Source: sportstg.com
Rules for classification: 1) points; 2) goal difference; 3) number of goals scored.
(C) Champions

==== Finals ====
Semi-finals
1	Narrabundah B	1
2	UC Pumas FC	0
3	Belconnen Utd B	4
4	ANU FC C	0

Preliminary Final
1	UC Pumas FC	0
2	Belconnen Utd B	1

Grand Final
1	Narrabundah B	3
2	Belconnen Utd B	1

=== 2017 Women's Premier League ===
(Australian Capital Territory) Women's National Premier League
- Season: 2017
- Champions: Canberra FC
- Premiers: Belconnen United
- Matches: 84
- Goals: 433 (5.15 per match)
- Top goalscorer: Madelyn Whittall (32 goals)
- Biggest home win: 13–0; Belconnen United vs Canberra Olympic; 29 April 2017
- Biggest away win: 2–15; Canberra Olympic vs Canberra United Academy; 2 April 2017
- Highest scoring: 17 goals (see biggest away win)

The highest tier domestic football competition in the ACT is known as the ACT Women's National Premier League (WNPL). Each team played each other three times for a total of 21 rounds, plus a finals series for the top 4 teams.

Pos	Team	Pld	W	D	L	GF	GA	GD	Pts	Qualification or relegation
1	Belconnen United	21	19	1	1	106	5	+101	58	2017 ACT WNPL Finals
2	Gungahlin United	21	13	2	6	74	30	+44	41	2017 ACT WNPL Finals
3	Canberra (C)	21	12	3	6	56	32	+24	39	2017 ACT WNPL Finals
4	Woden Weston	21	11	3	7	48	36	+12	36	2017 ACT WNPL Finals
5	Canberra United Academy	20	11	0	9	66	48	+18	33	
6	Tuggeranong United	21	8	1	12	44	60	−16	25	
7	Monaro Panthers	21	2	3	16	22	100	−78	9	
8	Canberra Olympic	20	0	1	19	17	122	−105	1	

Source: sportstg.com
Rules for classification: 1) points; 2) goal difference; 3) number of goals scored.
Notes:
- Canberra United Academy and Canberra Olympic final game washed out.
  (C) Champions

==== Finals ====
Semi-finals
1	Belconnen United	3
2	Gungahlin United	2
3	Canberra	2
4	Woden Weston	1

Preliminary Final
Gungahlin United	0
Canberra	1

Grand Final
Belconnen United	1(1)
Canberra	1(3)

== Cup Competitions ==
=== 2017 Federation Cup ===
(Australian Capital Territory) 2017 Federation Cup
Tournament details
- Dates: 11 April – 17 June 2017
- Teams: 20

Final positions
- Champions: Canberra Olympic (6th title)
- Runners-up: Tuggeranong United

Tournament statistics
- Matches played: 19
- Goals scored: 91 (4.79 per match)

2017 was the 55th edition of the Capital Football Federation Cup. The Federation cup acts as the preliminary rounds for the FFA Cup in the ACT with the Cup winner entering the subsequent FFA Cup round of 32. In 2017, the Federation Cup, which was open to all senior men's teams registered with Capital Football, consisted of two rounds, quarter-finals, semi-finals and a final, running from April to June 2017. Olympic won the Cup final 2–0 to lift back-to-back Federation Cups, thanks to a brace from Robbie Cattanach at Deakin Stadium.

2017 Capital Football Federation Cup
Tie no	Home team (tier)	Score	Away team (tier)
Round 1
1	Lanyon United (-)	2–0	Narrabundah FC (3)
2	White Eagles (3)	7–1	Burns FC (-)
3	Weston Molonglo (3)	5–3	Brindabella Blues (3)
4	Goulburn Strikers (-)	4–3†	Goulburn Stags (-)
Round 2
1	Riverina Rhinos (2)	2–0	Weston Molonglo (3)
2	Lanyon United (-)	0–2	Tuggeranong United (2)
3	Woden Weston (2)	4–1	Queanbeyan City (3)
4	Canberra Olympic (2)	6–0	Goulburn Strikers (-)
5	White Eagles (3)	0–5	Canberra FC (2)
6	Tigers FC (2)	3–1	ANU FC (3)
7	Belconnen United (2)	1–1†	Monaro Panthers (2)
Monaro Panthers advance 3–1 on penalties.
8	O'Connor Knights (3)	1–7	Gungahlin United (2)
Quarter-finals
1	Canberra Olympic (2)	3–0	Woden Weston (2)
2	Gungahlin United (2)	1–4	Monaro Panthers (2)
3	Tuggeranong United (2)	8–2	Riverina Rhinos (2)
4	Canberra FC (2)	3–1	Tigers FC (2)
Semi-finals
1	Canberra FC (2)	1–3	Canberra Olympic (2)
2	Monaro Panthers (2)	1–3	Tuggeranong United (2)
Final
1	Canberra Olympic (2)	2–0	Tuggeranong United (2)

Notes:

- † = After Extra Time

=== 2017 Charity Shield ===
2017 was the second edition of the annual ACT Charity Shield contested to kick off the 2017 Capital Football season. Money raised from the event goes towards a nominated charity, which in 2017 was CanTeen Australia.

18 March 2017	Canberra Olympic	5–2	Tigers FC	Gungahlin, Canberra
18:00	Gulevsk 5'; Domenici 28', 71'; Cattanach 49'; Gulevsk 58'	Report	Barac 32'; Abot 69'	Stadium: Gungahlin Enclosed Oval

== See also ==
- Soccer in the Australian Capital Territory
- Sport in the Australian Capital Territory
