= Gungahlin United FC =

- Full name: Gungahlin United Football Club
- Nickname: The Gunners
- Founded: 1997
- Dissolved: 2025
- Ground: Gungahlin Enclosed Oval
- Capacity: 1,150
- Coordinates: 35°11′6″S 149°7′38″E
- President: Aaron Alexander
- Head Coach: Javier Roca
Home colours	Away colours

Gungahlin United Football Club was an Australian professional soccer club based in the Canberra district of Gungahlin, ACT. Gungahlin competes in the National Premier Leagues Capital Football with home matches played at the recently constructed Gungahlin Enclosed Oval.

== History ==
The club was established by the local Canberra Italian community in 1963 under the name Juventus Soccer Club, inspired by the Italian club of the same name. Juventus competed in the ACT Division One and the Federation Cup in their inaugural season. The following year the club won the league, receiving qualification to the Australia Cup. They competed in the 1965 and 1967 Australia Cup, where they failed to progress past the first round.

In 1973, Juventus SC toured New Zealand between 30 September and 7 October. Juventus was one of the first sporting teams from the ACT to tour New Zealand. The club started the tour in Auckland at Newmarket Park with matches against Auckland and Auckland U23s. Juventus lost both matches 1–3 and 0–3 respectively. Juventus' second tour destination took the club to Muir Park in Hamilton to take on Hamilton AFC on 4 October. Juventus and Hamilton drew 1–1 with a goal from M Valeri securing the visitors a draw. 6 October, Juventus continued its tour in the New Zealand capital of Wellington when they faced off against Wellington City at Rongotai College. Juventus repeated its feats in Hamilton and secured a second 1–1 draw of the tour with J Campbell scoring for Juve. Juventus finished its tour on 7 October at English Oval in the city of Christchurch. Juve succumbed to a 2–0 loss at the hands of Christchurch United.

In 1997, Juventus Soccer Club established the Gungahlin Juventus Soccer Club to cater for the growing number of players in the Gungahlin region.

27 September 2002, Gungahlin Juventus expanded junior operations for boys and girls by incorporating a new separate association under the name Gungahlin Junior Soccer Club (ACT). The new association retained the traditional colours and style of the senior Juventus club.

25 January 2005, Juventus acted to align itself with the national naming scheme to attract a broader base of players for both seniors and juniors and changed its name to Gungahlin United Football Club.

In 2006, following the conclusion of the 2006 ACT Premier League season, Capital Football restructured the Premier League and Gungahlin was removed from the top-tier competition.

In 2011, United entered into a partnership agreement with Premier League club, Canberra City SC, to provide a pathway for Gungahlin players to the ACT Premier League for the first time since 2006. Youth teams at Premier League level competed under the name Gungahlin United, while the senior Premier League team competed under the banner of Canberra City. The partnership was ended in 2012.

In 2015, Gungahlin United was granted a National Premier Leagues (NPL) licence by Capital Football to field a team in the now named National Premier League Capital Football (formally ACT Premier League). This included junior and senior teams for both men and women. In the same year, the team won the Federation Cup, thereby qualifying for the round of 32 of the FFA Cup in 2015.

3 May 2015, Gungahlin United won its first ever NPL match with a 3–1 victory over Woden-Weston at Gungahlin Enclosed. Gungahlin overturned a one-goal deficit at half time to secure the win thanks to goals from Stephen Domenici, Shane Murray and Michael John.

20 June 2015, Gungahlin United won its first trophy in its first year of entering the NPL by clinching the 2015 Federation Cup with a 1–0 victory in extra time over Belconnen. Gungahlin was down to 10 men, thanks to a second half red card to Regan Walsh, but Daniel Barac scored the winning goal in extra time to secure the Cup. By winning the Cup, Gungahlin qualified for the 2015 FFA Cup as Capital Football's representative.

5 July 2015, Gunners drew a home match against former NSL winners Sydney Olympic in the round of 32 in the 2015 FFA Cup. Gungahlin were subsequently beaten by Sydney Olympic at Gungahlin Enclosed 0–1 on 4 August 2015. A crowd of 1,603 turned out on the Tuesday night and saw Olympic substitute Michael Gaitatzis score the winning goal in the 82nd minute of the match.

In 2017, GUFC finished fourth in the ACT NPL and qualified for their inaugural finals series since re-introduction to top flight football in the ACT. Gunners defeated Canberra FC 3–0 in the minor semi-final before succumbing to a 0–2 loss to Canberra Olympic in the preliminary final.

In 2019, Gungahlin United won the ACT NPL Mens Grand final beating Tigers FC 5-0 in a dominant display from GUFC with Goalscorers (Jeremy Habtemariam 20’, 57’, Antoni Timotheou 76’, Micheal John 84’, 88’) Sealing the Win at Deakin Stadium for the GUFC Side led by Marcial Munoz and Frank Barresi.

In 2024, Gungahlin United won the ACT NPL Mens League, with 47 points beating Canberra Croatia out for the title, the side led by Javier Roca secured the Title at the AIS Playing fields, After winning the league GUFC then Fell short in the semi finals to tigers fc. then the Grand final was won by Canberra Croatia.

== Club identity ==
=== Club name ===
Gungahlin United has gone through a handful of club names during the course of its history since 1968. These naming incarnations are listed below:

#	Name	From	To
1	Juventus Soccer Club	1963	1996
2	Gungahlin Juventus Soccer Club	1997	2005
3	Gungahlin United Football Club	2006	2025

Additionally, between 2002 and 2005 the club set up an affiliate junior club to provide youngsters in the Gungahlin district of Canberra a junior pathway to participate in. The club was known as Gungahlin Junior Soccer Club and in 2006 this club was merged with the senior club to create Gungahlin United FC.

The choice to change the name of the club to United from Juventus in 2006 was a decision made to align with a national naming scheme and to incorporate the introduction of a broader playing base.

Gungahlin Juventus crest, first used in 1997 and last used in 2005

=== Club colours and crest ===
Gungahlin United still uses its traditional colours of white, black and yellow. The club has gone through a number of crest changes since its inception in 1963. In 2006 the club dropped its traditional black and white stripes from its crest but retained the central football with the yellow wings.

In 2016, a logo design competition was set up by GUFC to commemorate 20 Years of Gungahlin United Football Club. The crest could be any shape, could include the club's nickname 'The Gunners' and must use the club colours of black, white and yellow and the words Gungahlin United FC. The competition was open to the public between 5 June 2016 till 30 September 2016 and involved a small prize for the winning design. The top ten designs were made public for comment and the top three designs were put to the executive committee for a vote on 7 January 2017.

=== Home venue ===
Gungahlin United's NPL first team home venue was the Gungahlin Enclosed Oval. The ground was constructed in 2013/14 with the official opening on 7 March 2014. The stadium has a seating capacity of 1,150 (550 under cover) and an overall capacity of 5,000. Gungahlin United is one of four tenants of the venue with the multi-purpose field being used for association football, Australian rules football, rugby union and rugby league. Canberra based Stewart Architecture was the architect of the stadium which cost stadium owner, the ACT Government, $12.5 million to build. The ground has a natural water-efficient grass surface, team and officials' changing rooms, public toilets, canteen and storage for both users and maintenance staff. Rooms are provided for coaches, the ground announcer and the operator of the electronic scoreboard. There is also a club room which can be used for after/pre-match functions. The venue has played host to Gungahlin United's round of 32 FFA Cup match against former NSL NSW club Sydney Olympic FC and pre-season friendly matches involving A-League club Central Coast Mariners as well as being selected as a reserve training venue for the 2015 Asian Cup tournament in case McKellar Park became unavailable.

== Honours ==
- ACT League Premiers and Finals Champions

As West Woden Juventus

Premiers (7): 1964, 1965, 1967, 1968, 1970, 1972, 1974
Runners-up (3): 1966, 1973, 1986
Champions (7): 1964, 1965, 1968, 1970, 1971, 1972, 1986
Runners-up (4): 1963, 1966, 1973, 1995

As Gungahlin United

Premiers (2): 2000, 2024
Runners-up (6): 2001, 2002, 2004, 2015, 2019, 2024
Champions (3): 2001, 2015, 2019
Runners-up (2): 2000, 2004

- Capital Football Federation Cup

As West Woden Juventus

Winners (5): 1965, 1966, 1967, 1968, 1988
Runners-up (5): 1969, 1972, 1985, 1986, 1987

As Gungahlin United

Winners (4): 2000, 2001, 2003, 2015
Runners-up (2): 2002, 2018

== Season-by-season results ==
The below table is updated with the statistics and final results for Gungahlin United FC following the conclusion of each National Premier League Capital Football season.

Champions	Runners-up	Third place

Gungahlin United Season-by-Season Results
Ref	Season	National Premier League ACT										NPL Finals	Fed Cup	FFA Cup	Top scorer	
Ref	Season	GP	W	D	L	GF	GA	GD	PTS	League	Finals	NPL Finals	Fed Cup	FFA Cup	Name	Goals
	2015	16	7	4	5	33	30	+3	25	6th	–	–	W	–	Stephen Domenici	5
	2016	18	6	4	8	20	29	−9	22	6th	–	–	2R	R32	Jack Green	3
	2017	18	10	2	6	32	32	0	32	4th	PF	–	QF	–	Jason O'Dwyer	8
	2018	16	4	4	8	21	25	−4	16	6th	–	–	RU	–	Jason O'Dwyer	3

== See also ==
- Gungahlin United FC Womens
- List of sports clubs inspired by others
- Sport in the Australian Capital Territory
- Soccer in the Australian Capital Territory
- Canberra Juventus FC
