= 2015 Capital Football season =

(Australian Capital Territory) Capital Football
- Season: 2015
- Champions: Canberra Olympic
- Cup winners: Gungahlin United
- Premiers: Canberra FC

The 2015 Capital Football season was the third season under the new competition format in the Australian Capital Territory. The overall premier for the new structure qualified for the National Premier Leagues finals series, competing with the other state federation champions in a final knockout tournament to decide the National Premier Leagues Champion for 2015.

== League Tables ==
=== 2015 National Premier League ACT ===
(Australian Capital Territory) NPL Capital Football
- Season: 2015
- Champions: Canberra Olympic
- Premiers: Canberra FC
- Matches: 64
- Goals: 303 (4.73 per match)
- Top goalscorer: Alex Oloriegbe; Thomas James (19 goals)

The 2015 National Premier League ACT season was played over 18 rounds, from April to August 2015.

Pos	Team	Pld	W	D	L	GF	GA	GD	Pts	Qualification or relegation
1	Canberra	16	11	3	2	53	27	+26	36	2015 National Premier Leagues Finals
2	Tigers FC	16	12	1	3	52	27	+25	34 (Note: Tigers FC were penalised three competition points due to a breach of NPL playing roster conditions.)	2015 ACT Finals
3	Belconnen United	16	10	4	2	38	24	+14	34	2015 ACT Finals
4	FFA Centre of Excellence	16	8	4	4	38	30	+8	28	
5	Canberra Olympic (C)	16	7	4	5	38	21	+17	25	2015 ACT Finals
6	Gungahlin United	16	7	4	5	33	30	+3	25	
7	Woden Weston	16	3	2	11	20	40	−20	11	
8	Monaro Panthers	16	2	2	12	19	48	−29	8	
9	Tuggeranong United	16	0	0	16	12	56	−44	0	

Source: foxsportspulse.com
Rules for classification: 1) points; 2) goal difference; 3) number of goals scored.
(C) Champions

==== Finals ====
Semi-finals
1	Canberra	2
2	Tigers FC	1
3	Belconnen United	2
5	Canberra Olympic	4

Preliminary Final
2	Tigers FC	1
5	Canberra Olympic	4

Grand Final
1	Canberra	1
5	Canberra Olympic	3

==== Top Scorers ====
Rank	Player	Club	Goals
1	(Australia) Alex Oloriegbe	Tigers FC	19
1	(England) Thomas James	Canberra FC	19
3	(Italy) Julian Borgna	Tigers FC	11
4	(Colombia) Philippe Bernabo-Madrid	Canberra Olympic	10
5	(Australia) Robert Cattanach	Canberra Olympic	9
6	(Australia) Aisosa Ihegie	Belconnen United	8
6	(Australia) Callum Smith	Canberra Olympic	8
6	(Australia) Jason Ugrinic	Belconnen United	8
6	(Australia) Nicholas Panetta	FFA Centre of Excellence	8

=== 2015 ACT Capital League ===
(Australian Capital Territory) Capital League
- Season: 2015
- Champions: ANU FC
- Premiers: Monaro Panthers B
- Matches: 64
- Goals: 234 (3.66 per match)
- Top goalscorer: Olaide Yinka-Kehinde (16 goals)

The 2015 ACT Capital League was the third edition of the new Capital League as the second level domestic association football competition in the ACT. 9 teams competed, all playing each other twice for a total of 16 matches.

Pos	Team	Pld	W	D	L	GF	GA	GD	Pts	Qualification or relegation
1	Monaro Panthers B	16	12	2	2	42	21	+21	38	2015 ACT Capital League Finals
2	ANU FC (C)	16	10	4	2	48	21	+27	34	2015 ACT Capital League Finals
3	Tuggeranong United B	16	8	3	5	34	26	+8	27	2015 ACT Capital League Finals
4	White Eagles	16	7	4	5	31	19	+12	25	2015 ACT Capital League Finals
5	Narrabundah	16	5	4	7	26	26	0	19	
6	Queanbeyan City	16	4	5	7	20	31	−11	17	
7	Canberra Olympic B	16	3	8	5	20	34	−14	17	
8	O'Connor Knights	16	3	4	9	20	43	−23	13	
9	ADFA Vikings	16	1	4	11	11	31	−20	7	

Source: sportstg.com
(C) Champions

==== Finals ====
Semi-finals
1	Monaro Panthers B	1
2	ANU FC	3
3	Tuggeranong B	0
4	White Eagles	4

Preliminary Final
Monaro Panthers B	0
White Eagles	6

Grand Final
ANU FC	1(4)
White Eagles	1(3)

=== 2015 Capital Football Division 1 ===
(Australian Capital Territory) Capital Football Division 1
- Season: 2015
- Champions: Belconnen United B
- Premiers: Weston Molonglo B
- Matches: 90
- Goals: 356 (3.96 per match)
- Top goalscorer: William Nichols (20 Goals)

The 2015 ACT Capital Football Division 1 was the first edition of the new Capital League Division 1 as the third level domestic association football competition in the ACT. 10 teams competed, all playing each team twice for a total of 18 rounds.

Pos	Team	Pld	W	D	L	GF	GA	GD	Pts	Qualification or relegation
1	Weston Molonglo B	18	13	2	3	55	19	+36	41	2015 Capital Football Division 1 Finals
2	Belconnen United B (C)	18	13	0	5	50	27	+23	39	2015 Capital Football Division 1 Finals
3	Lanyon United	18	12	2	4	43	20	+23	38	2015 Capital Football Division 1 Finals
4	UC Pumas	18	11	2	5	41	27	+14	35	2015 Capital Football Division 1 Finals
5	Canberra City	18	11	1	6	39	34	+5	34	
6	ANU FC C	18	6	5	7	39	36	+3	23	
7	Goulburn Stags	17	5	3	9	26	33	−7	18	
8	Canberra Olympic C	17	4	4	9	32	37	−5	16	
9	Burns FC	18	3	1	14	18	52	−34	10	
10	Goulburn Strikers	18	0	2	16	13	71	−58	2	

Source: sportstg.com
(C) Champions

^{NB}One match was postponed and subsequently could not be played.

==== Finals ====
Semi-finals
1	Weston Molonglo B	0
2	Belconnen Utd B	4
3	Lanyon United	0
4	UC Pumas	1

Preliminary Final
Weston Molonglo B	2
UC Pumas	3

Grand Final
Belconnen Utd B	4
UC Pumas	0

=== 2015 Women's Capital League and Division 1 ===
(Australian Capital Territory) Capital Football Women's Capital League and Division 1
- Season: 2015
- Champions: UC Pumas (Div1); Weston Molonglo (CL)
- Premiers: Weston Molonglo
- Matches: 90
- Goals: 328 (3.64 per match)
- Top goalscorer: Lee Dickson (28 goals)

2015 saw a combined Capital (CL) and Division One (Div1) league for the women with the two divisions splitting into separate finals post the regular season.

Pos	Team	Pld	W	D	L	GF	GA	GD	Pts	Qualification or relegation
1	Weston Molonglo	18	15	2	1	69	16	+53	47	2015 CL Finals
2	Olympic Blue	18	14	3	1	67	17	+50	45	2015 CL Finals
3	UC Pumas	18	12	2	4	48	25	+23	38	2015 Div1 Finals
4	Belwest	18	7	4	7	23	25	−2	25	2015 Div1 Finals
5	Belconnen United	18	6	4	8	28	39	−11	22	2015 CL Finals
6	Gungahlin United	18	5	5	8	33	32	+1	20	2015 CL Finals
7	ANU (Div1)	18	5	3	10	21	44	−23	18	2015 Div1 Finals
8	ANU (CL)	18	4	5	9	19	24	−5	17	
9	Goulburn Strikers	18	4	2	12	10	44	−34	14	2015 Div1 Finals
10	Tuggeranong United	18	2	2	14	15	62	−47	8	

Source: sportstg.com
Rules for classification: 1) points; 2) goal difference; 3) number of goals scored.

==== CL Finals ====
Semi-finals
1	Weston Molonglo	2
4	Gungahlin United	0
2	Olympic Blue	2
3	Belconnen United	0

Grand Final
1	Weston Molonglo	2
2	Olympic Blue	0

==== Div 1 Finals ====
Semi-finals
1	UC Pumas	5
4	Goulburn Strikers	1
2	Belwest	2
3	ANU (Div1)	0

Grand Final
1	UC Pumas	2
2	Belwest	1

== Cup Competitions ==
=== 2015 Federation Cup ===
(Australian Capital Territory) 2015 Federation Cup
Tournament details
- Dates: 14 April – 20 June 2015
- Teams: 17

Final positions
- Champions: Gungahlin United (8th title, 1st as GUFC)
- Runners-up: Belconnen United

Tournament statistics
- Matches played: 17
- Goals scored: 81 (4.76 per match)

2015 was the 53rd edition of the Capital Football Federation Cup. The Federation cup acts as the preliminary rounds for the FFA Cup in the ACT with the Cup winner entering the subsequent FFA Cup round of 32. In 2015, the Federation Cup, which is open to all senior men's teams registered with Capital Football, consisted of two rounds, quarter-finals, semi-finals and a final. NPL clubs entered the tournament in the second round. The Cup ran from 14 April 2015 (first round) till 20 June 2015 (final). Gungahlin clinched the 2015 Cup with a 1–0 victory in extra time over Belconnen, with Daniel Barac scoring the winning goal.

2015 Capital Football Federation Cup
Tie no	Home team (tier)	Score	Away team (tier)
Round 1
1	Brindabella Blues (6)	2–1	Goulburn Strikers (4)
2	Canberra City (4)	2–9	ANU FC (3)
3	Narrabundah FC (3)	5–2	O'Connor Knights (3)
Round 2
1	Narrabundah FC (3)	0–5	Gungahlin United (2)
2	Lanyon United (4)	0–5	Monaro Panthers (2)
3	Brindabella Blues (6)	0–6	Canberra Olympic (2)
4	Woden Weston (2)	2–5 (a.e.t.)	Tuggeranong United (2)
5	ANU FC (3)	1–0	Queanbeyan City (3)
6	Tigers FC (2)	4–3	Canberra FC (2)
7	White Eagles (3)	3–0	Weston-Molonglo (4)
Quarter-finals
1	Gungahlin United (2)	2–1	Canberra Olympic (2)
2	Tigers FC (2)	4–1	White Eagles (3)
3	Monaro Panthers (2)	2–3	Tuggeranong United (2)
4	ANU FC (3)	1–5	Belconnen United (2)
Semi-finals
1	Tuggeranong United (2)	1–2	Belconnen United (2)
2	Tigers FC (2)	0–3	Gungahlin United (2)
Final
1	Belconnen United (2)	0–1 (a.e.t.)	Gungahlin United (2)

== See also ==
- Soccer in the Australian Capital Territory
- Sport in the Australian Capital Territory
