= West Canberra Wanderers FC =

- Full name: West Canberra Wanderers Football Club
- Nickname: Wanderers
- Founded: 2014 as Woden-Weston FC (WMFC-1971 and WVFC-2007)
- Ground: Melrose High School (Canberra)
- Capacity: 1,000
- Coordinates: 35°20′40″S 149°5′47″E
- President: Stein Helgeby
- Technical Director: Rey Castro
- League: Capital league Division 1
- 2025: 8th of 8 (relegated); Capital Premier League
- Website: https://www.westcanberrawanderers.org.au/
Home colours	Away colours

West Canberra Wanderers Football Club, previously known as Woden-Weston FC is a semi-professional soccer club based in Canberra, Australia. The club currently competes in the Capital Premier League and the National Premier League.

West Canberra Wanderers FC field teams in Junior and senior (adult) men's and women's National Premier League competitions in the ACT. The club has historic links to the community clubs Woden Valley Football Club and Weston-Molonglo Football Club.

== History ==
Weston Molonglo FC (formally Weston Creek Soccer Club), founded in 1971, competed in the ACT Premier League from 1992 to 2002 when the club dropped out of the top level of men's football in the ACT due to the retirements of Warren Barsley and James Lee from presidency and senior men's chair respectively.

Woden Valley FC was formed in 2007 to distinguish itself as a senior club from junior club Woden Valley SC (formed in 1989), and participated in the ACT Premier League and later the National Premier League: Capital Football until 2014.

In late 2014, then Woden Valley FC President John Brooks approached Weston-Molonglo FC men's chair Chris Webb to discuss the possibility of a merged entity to enter the NPL and women's Premier League.

Woden-Weston FC was incorporated in November 2014 with the intention to merge the elite levels of Woden Valley FC and Weston Molonglo FC into one club to compete in the 2015 National Premier League: Capital Football and beyond.

20 February 2015, the new merged club was officially launched as Woden-Weston FC at the Woden Tradies Club, with the two regional ACT clubs, together fielding combined teams in the NPL and women's premier league from u12's through to seniors, however the community league sides (both junior and senior) remained under the separate control of the two community clubs: Weston-Molonglo FC and Woden Valley SC.

The new merged club adopted the colours from both clubs with the black from Weston-Molonglo and Red from Woden Valley picked to form the new strip. The strip has been compared to the Western Sydney Wanderers home strip with red and black hoops. The inaugural manager appointed to the men's NPL team was former Canberra FC coach Miro Trninic while the women's PL inaugural manager was long-time Weston-Molonglo coach Pat Mills. The inaugural club technical director was 'Rockin' Rod Lyons.

By the end of 2016, due to various differences between Woden Valley FC and Woden-Weston FC, the clubs agreed to separate, becoming their own entities again.

=== 2015 Inaugural season ===
On 12 April 2015, Woden-Weston FC took to the field away from home for their maiden men's first grade ACT NPL match against Tigers FC relinquishing a one-goal lead to lose narrowly 2-1.

On 24 April 2015, Woden-Weston played their inaugural home match at Woden Park against Tuggeranong United in what was billed as the Southside derby and was the inaugural match for the Mount Taylor Cup. Under the flood-lights Woden-Weston had its first victory, 4–0. Both Pepe Varga and Tim Anderson scored braces in the match, enabling the players to lift the newly created Mount Taylor Cup.

=== 2016 season ===
On 2 November 2015, Woden Weston FC appointed Martin Lategui as men's head coach along with a number of other coaching appointments for the 2016 season.

On 13 May 2016, after five matches in charge, Martin Lategui quit as head coach of Woden-Weston. Club president, Steve Rohan-Jones said the main reason for the split was a difference in philosophy in how the first team was run. Technical Director Rey Castro was appointed interim Head Coach for the remainder of the 2016 season.

While only the club's second season, it was fairly successful, with the clubs NPL u/13s winning the grand final to clinch the championship.

=== 2017 season ===
4 October 2016, Woden Weston appointed Tony Olivera as the club's new men's first team Head Coach as well as a list of new coaching staff for the 2017 NPL season. Long time Woden Valley coaches

=== 2018 season ===
27 November 2017, Woden Weston FC appointed El Salvadoran born Rey Castro as the club's Head Coach and Technical Director. Castro had previously managed a young Wanderers Men's 1st grade on interim basis in 2016 (managing 2 wins and a draw in 12 games). As announced in Woden - Weston FC's Facebook page, Rey Castro's appointment as head coach was meant for Wanderers officials to create a pathway to NPL football for youth (women and men) in the region. Castro has been part of Wanderer's coaching staff for the previous two seasons as Technical Director.

== Club facilities ==
West Canberra Wanderers FC home fields are at the Melrose Synthetic & Grass fields in Pearce ACT. Additional training grounds include fields at Garran near the Canberra Hospital.

== Players ==
=== Inaugural squad ===
After the merger and with the departure of previous Woden Valley FC head coach Mitch Stevens and Weston-Molonglo FC head coach Graeme Plath, only six players returned from the Woden Valley team that competed in the 2014 ACTPL and three players from the 2014 Premiership winning Weston-Molonglo FC Capital League side. The new squad for 2015 saw a number of players drafted in from Canberra City (who dropped out of the NPL) and Monaro Panthers.

The long-term plan for the club is to bring players through the youth ranks into the senior elite setup. The major challenge for the club that has a youth pool of over 3,500 players to draw from is to retain strong players once they graduate to first team football as traditionally both the community clubs struggled to compete financially with some of the other NPL clubs in the ACT when previously participating in the first grade.

=== Current squad ===
Current NPL Squad as of 31 March 2019.

Note: Flags indicate national team as defined under FIFA eligibility rules; some limited exceptions apply. Players may hold more than one non-FIFA nationality.

No.	Pos.	Nation	Player
3	DF	AUS	Adam De Franshesci (c)
4	DF	AUS	Connor Bill
7	MF	SDN	Martin Deng
9	MF	AUS	Chris McEwan
13	MF	ENG	Benjamin Mann-Townsley
14	FW	BOT	Phakedi Manda
15	MF	AUS	Seamus Carr
16	MF	SDN	Deng Deng
18	GK	AUS	Ben Yeo
19	DF	AUS	Angus Bailey

== Coaching staff ==
=== Current staff ===
Current as of 1 January 2023

==== Men ====
Men's First Team
Position	Name
Head coach	Dom English & George Economopoulos
Assistant Coaches	Rob Twommey
Seniors GK Coach	TBA

==== Women ====
Women's First Team
Position	Name
Head coach	Rey Castro
Assistant Coach	Antony Ceruti

=== Men's head coach history ===
No.	Manager	From	To	Played	Wins	Draws	Losses	GF	GA	GD	Win %
1	Miro Trninic	8 March 2015	2 August 2015	16	3	2	11	20	40	−20	18.8%
2	Martin Lategui	2 November 2015	13 May 2016	5	1	0	4	5	16	−11	20%
3	Rey Castro*	14 May 2016	3 October 2016	12	2	1	9	11	33	−22	27.0%
4	Tony Olivera	4 October 2016	November 2017	18	4	2	12	31	52	−21	22.2%
5	Rey Castro	November 2017	November 2019	16	4	6	6	32	36	−4	43.75%
5	Ulisses Da Silva	November 2019	November 2021	3	2	0	1	4	5	−1	66.7

(*) – Denotes interim manager

=== Club management ===
Current as of 4 February 2025

Club Management
Position	Name
Club President	Stein Helgeby
Vice President	Chris Webb
Secretary	Marc Mowbray-d'Arbela
Treasurer	George Sotiropoulos
Technical Director	Rey Castro
Member Protection Officer	Jane ShunWah
Members	Lachlan Cotter; Deb Moss

== Season-by-season results ==
The below table is updated with the statistics and final results for Woden-Weston FC following the conclusion of each National Premier League Capital Football season.

Champions	Runners-up	Third Place

Woden-Weston FC Season-by-Season Results
Ref	Season	National Premier League ACT										NPL Finals	Fed Cup	FFA Cup	Top scorer	
Ref	Season	GP	W	D	L	GF	GA	GD	PTS	League	Finals	NPL Finals	Fed Cup	FFA Cup	Name	Goals
	2015	16	3	2	11	20	40	−20	11	7th	-	-	2R	-	Nikolas Popovich	6
	2016	18	3	1	14	16	55	−39	10	10th	-	-	QF	-	Daniel Di-Salvatore	2
	2017	18	4	2	12	31	52	−21	14	8th	-	-	QF	-	Daniel Crkovski	12
	2018	16	4	6	6	32	36	−4	15 (Note: Woden-Weston had 3 league results and 1 Fed Cup result forfeited for fielding an ineligible player in their squad and breaching the Player Points System (PPS). Source)	7th	-	-	SF	-	Olaide Yinka-Kehinde	12
