= Canberra White Eagles FC =

Australian amateur football club

White Eagles FC
- Full name: Canberra White Eagles; Football Club
- Nickname: Beli Orlovi
- Founded: 1992
- Ground: Boomanulla Enclosed Oval - Narrabundah, ACT
- Capacity: 1,000
- Coordinates: 35°20′17.0196″S 149°9′10.4544″E
- President: Mark Stoya
- Head coach: Goran Noveski
- League: NPL Capital Football
- 2026: 11th of 11
Home colours	Away colours

Canberra White Eagles FC (commonly known simply as White Eagles) is an Australian semi-professional association Football Club based in the southern region of Canberra, Australian Capital Territory. Founded in 1992 by the Canberra Serbian community, the club currently competes in the National Premier Leagues Capital Football competition.

== History ==
=== The Beginning ===
The club was officially formed in 1992. Previously a number of Serbian teams existed but only for short spells, including the likes of Farrer United, Mawson Serbia and Canberra United which ceased in 1990.

In 1993 the club entered the local league with teams in State League 2 and State League 4, with State 4 being the reserve team. The squads had a good mix of experience, flair, discipline and enthusiasm. Both teams won their respective competitions that season with results such as 9–1 common. The club was successful in gaining promotion to State League 1 and State League 2.

The following year the senior team brought more success to the club winning the State League 1 competition. The Reserves did not fare as well but nevertheless still had a successful year.

As time passed the playing careers of the senior players ended and together with some unexpected departures the senior team became a junior team. For the next few years both teams could not match the success of the past.

=== 2000 ===
In 2000 club officials hired an Argentine coach and he immediately brought success. This was mainly due to the other players that he attracted to the club such as Gus Cerro (former NSL player). The club again won the competition but due to changing rules of the governing body the club was denied entry to the ACT Premier League. The team basically fell apart again, apart from that same core group of players that existed previously.

The next couple of years the club walked the tightrope, at times struggling both on and off the field. The core group of players remained committed. In 2003 that core group of players reached their pinnacle and won the Grand Final against the odds, particularly so because it was against their fierce rivals. The team came back from 1–0 down to win 2–1.

=== 2004 – 2021 ===
In 2004 the team produced the best season ever as they completed the Division 1 season undefeated, winning both the League title and the Grand Final and thus finally gaining promotion to the Premier League.

In the first year of Premier League football the club surprised many of the well established teams throughout the season. The team finished only a few points away from the top four.

The second season (2006) was strangely, a greater challenge than the first. Several experienced players left the club as they pursued other personal challenges. These players were difficult to replace, particularly for the defence. The club also had to allow for players under the age of 20 as per regulations, so the Premier League team was significantly more inexperienced than the team from the previous season. The team struggled but the season was valuable for the next generation of players.

=== 2006 ===
Capital Football undertook a review of the Premier League with a view to restructuring the competition. The competition was dissolved so no clubs remained part of the Premier League. All the Premier League clubs and some Division 1 clubs were invited to apply for the new competition. For clubs to do so they were required to submit a 3-year Business Plan outlining for financial administration and technical development of players.

Unfortunately the Premier League experience ends there as Capital Football moved the goal posts, again. The White Eagles were unsuccessful in retaining their position for the premier league as the Club did not have a sufficient junior base which was one of the requirements that Capital Football initiated.

Club officials quickly moved to rectify the issue considering forming a relationship with a junior club which did not progress beyond conception at this time. An appeal was submitted to Capital Football addressing the issue but Capital Football, despite acknowledging that the issue had been addressed successfully, still denied the club a place in the Premier League and suggested that the clubs maintain their relationship and be prepared to apply for the Premier League in the future.

Due to eligibility issues at the time, the club was placed back into the second tier.

Regardless of the setback of Premier League non-acceptance the Club fought on and produced another successful season by winning the 2007 Division 1 Championship, the club's 3rd Championship in 5 years.

The team repeated the feat the following season in 2008 winning another all-to-familiar State League 1 title. They were also Minor Premiers in 2009 where they lost to Cooma in the final and in 2010 before losing the Grand Final to Queanbeyan FC 1–0.

=== 2011 ===
The reserve grade side made their first final for quite some time, on the day they were out played by ANU 1–0 but put in a solid performance.

The first team for White Eagles FC won the Minor Premiership in 2011, losing one game in round 2 of the season to bitter rivals O'Connor knights. The grand final was a one sided affair with the eagles beating ANU 5–1.

=== 2012 ===
A new coach takes charge, preseason showed some exciting results with the team beating premier league side Woden Valley 6–1 in the federation cup. The season was a historic one for WEFC, going through undefeated winning the minor premiership and the grand final due to a super goal in extra time.

==== 2013 ====
The team showed their dominance yet again during the season, a performance in round 2 beating QBN city 7–0 and wrapping up the title with weeks to spare. The season finished with the team being knocked out in the semi-finals by a motivated Queanbeyan City and thus not being a part of the grand final for the first time since being relegated from the premier league.

=== 2014 ===
The club experienced several roster changes as players moved to the premier league or retired. The team finished the season as runners-up after losing the final match, which would have secured the league title.

=== 2015 ===
The club recruited and many new faces came to the club. It took a while or the team to gel and in the end the team finished a disappointing 4th. The club had a good finals series, beating Tuggeranong 4–0 in the minor semi, than demolishing the minor premiers Monaro 6–0 to earn a spot in the grand final. The final was contested between WEFC and ANU, eagles took the lead towards the end of the first half. Midway through the 2nd half ANU equalised and that was the way it finished up, in the shoot out ANU held their nerve and won the grand final.

=== 2016 ===
It took a while for the club to finalise their squad and preseason started later than usual. Once the season began things looked great, winning the first 5 with some impressive performances. The first loss was to QBN city 4–2 but 4 days later in the FFA cup beating them 5–0. The skinny squad battled injuries and suspensions throughout the year. The club finished in 2nd position behind ANU.

=== 2017 ===
Capital League turned out to be a very disappointing season for the Canberra White Eagles; with the club finishing 5th and failing to make the finals for the first time since stepping back from the premier league.

==== 2018 ====
ACT Capital League - Zoran Milenkovic returned to the head coaching role and the club brought in some new players. Huss Fureje going from Tigers FC, Nik Noveski coming from Woden Weston and former Joey's player Vuk Vucic. The team came so close to winning the premiership; finishing with 38 points; 1 point behind eventual premiers QBN on 39. The eagles beat QBN them 3–2 in the major semi final in a classic; Zinelabiddine Eljammoudi scoring a hat trick to send WEFC into the Grand Final. The GF did not turn out how we had hoped; ANU managed to take it out in that game.

=== 2019 ===
Inaugural NP2 Premiers

The Club appointed Graeme Plath as head coach, the first time the club had gone external in over a decade. Plath brought in a wealth of coaching and managerial experience as well as bringing in some new quality players such as Callum Beaton, Caleb Cullen-Rua, Ashley Collins, Tom Hewitt, Daniel Hately and David Kemp.

The Eagles started the season winning their first 5 games. Followed by a 2–2 draw with Queanbeyan and a 0–1 loss to old rivals O'Connor Knights. The team regained momentum winning 5 from their next 6 before dropping points to Queanbeyan again. WEFC had thought they had let the title slip, after a dominating performance away to O'Connor; leading 2–0 with ten minutes to spare the eagles conceded two late goals to draw 2-2 and thus leave the title out of their hands.

The last game of the season saw WEFC win convincingly against Brindabella 6–1 on the clubs Family Day; White eagles needed O'Connor to take points off ANU for them have a chance of winning the title. The news came in that O'Connor had won 2-0 which meant WEFC won the title on goal difference. The first premiership since 2013.

The club had a disappointing finals series, with WEFC knocked out in the semi-finals, but it finished the season with a semi-final appearance.

=== 2022 - 2026 ===
In 2022, WEFC embarked on a journey of revival, focusing on implementing a youth program designed to rebuild the club to meet NPL requirements and return to the top tier of football in the Australian Capital Territory. Over the following three years, WEFC established a strong and expanding youth base from entry level through to Under 14 SAP, along with core senior NPL squads, a CPL Women's team, a CPL Men's team, and two Masters Over 35s teams.

WEFC's current focus is to capitalise on its 2026 return to the NPL by ensuring ongoing compliance with NPL requirements while continuing to expand the club. This effort centres on community, culture, and creating a safe, inclusive, and respected environment for football development in the ACT, led by the Serbian community.

For the 2026 season, several major projects will progress, including:

- Acquisition of a clubhouse to better support the community and foster ongoing cultural development.
- Acquisition of a dedicated home ground that can meet the club's growing needs and provide the space, facilities, and resources required to support a complete development pathway from grassroots to NPL.
- Establishing teams in age groups 15 – 18 to complete the development pathway from grassroots (Pee Wees) to Senior NPL.
- Expanding the WEFC to meet the ongoing requirements for NPL Youth Teams to ensure a higher standard of development.

A fitting reflection of WEFC's advancement to the NPL, and the growing revival of the WEFC community, is the introduction of a modernised WEFC logo.

=== The Future ===
The club's vision of expansion extends beyond the present. The WEFC Committee has successfully secured hosting rights for the Australian Serbian annual National Tournament—the Karadjordje Kup—in 2028. By strengthening partnerships with Serbian football clubs and community organisations across Australia, and through its re‑establishment in the NPL, WEFC continues to work toward the objectives set by its founding members in 1992:

“To establish a community-based sports club to help develop sport in the A.C.T. by providing sporting teams for juniors and seniors... providing both physical development and fostering closer ties between the sporting public of the A.C.T. [and to] maintain a high level of sportsmanship and enjoyment of sport.” Original Registration Application of the WEFC (Serbian Sports Club White Eagles ACT), 12 February 1993

== Current squad ==
As of April 2026

=== NPL Mens First Team ===
The 2026 NPL season extends the commitment of Technical Director Milos MILUTINOVIC working with Head Coach Goran NOVESKI to lead a Coaching Staff including Assistant Coaches Groan MILUTINOVIC and Branko MILENOVIC; with Team Physio Jerry.

Our NPL Team Manager is Darko MILANOVIC.

Note: Flags indicate national team as defined under FIFA eligibility rules; some limited exceptions apply. Players may hold more than one non-FIFA nationality.

No.	Pos.	Nation	Player
1	GK	AUS	Lachlan DENLEY
2	DF	AUS	Kelvin DELLE
3	DF	USA	Antonio (Nino) FEROGLIA (International)
4	MF	AUS	Bailey SORENSON
5	DF	ARG	Ramon LINDNER (International)
6	DF	AUS	Ryan GULEVSKI
7	FW	KOR	Eunpyo LEE (International)
8	MF	AUS	Alex-Junior MALAUULU
9	MF	AUS	Ivan IVANEZA
10	FW	AUS	Fabian OLIVARES
11	DF	AUS	Nigel KALLEE
13	MF	AUS	Joshua YOUNG
16	MF	AUS	Josh HICKMAN
17	FW	AUS	Eugene ARKU
22	GK	AUS	Jacob COLE
23	DF	AUS	Aleksandar CVETKOVSKI

=== NPL U23 Team ===
Coach Stephen COX leads Team Managers Goran MILUTINOVIC and Darko MILANOVIC.

Note: Flags indicate national team as defined under FIFA eligibility rules; some limited exceptions apply. Players may hold more than one non-FIFA nationality.

No.	Pos.	Nation	Player
12		AUS	Jack MURRAY
15		AUS	William MANALO
23		AUS	Aleksandar CVETKOVSKI
24		AUS	Damian KENNEDY
25		AUS	Mcbenoni EZEIKIEL-HART
26		AUS	Jayden NCUBE
28		AUS	William PURSE
29		AUS	Aqel EFFENDY
30		AUS	Gabriel CESPEDES GARCIA
31		AUS	Damien MCKELLAR
32		AUS	Izaak EVANS
33		AUS	Faizal WAIRIMU
35		AUS	Diego CASTRO
36		AUS	Matthew CARBONE
37		AUS	Antonio CALABRIA
38		AUS	Tristan NGWENA
40		AUS	Precious OBILO
45		AUS	Jayden BEARDMORE

== Club Management ==
=== 2026 Committee ===
President	Mark STOYA
Vice President	Sasha TANASKOVIC
Secretary	Branka MILANOVIC
Treasurer	Vlad PANTIC
Ordinary Member	Nik JEVTOVIC
Sub Committee	Sasha STANKOVIC
Sub Committee	Darko MILANOVIC
Sub Committee	Goran MILUTINOVIC

== Honours ==
- ACT Capital League Premiers and Finals Champions.
  - NPL2 ACT/Capital Premier League

Premiers (7): 1994, 2004, 2009, 2010, 2011, 2012, 2013, 2019
Runner-up (2): 2014, 2016
Champions (7): 2003, 2004, 2007, 2008, 2009, 2011, 2012
Runner-up (2): 2010, 2015

- ACT State League 2.

Champions (1): 1993

- ACT State League 4.

Champions (1): 1993

== Season-by-season results ==
The below table is updated with the statistics and final results for White Eagles FC following the conclusion of each ACT Capital League season.

White Eagles FC Season-by-Season Results
Season	GP	W	D	L	GF	GA	GD	PTS	League	Finals
2013	15	12	3	0	51	8	+43	39	Premiers	Lost Semi-Final
2014	18	12	3	3	44	22	+22	39	Runner-up	Lost Preliminary Final
2015	16	7	4	5	31	19	+12	25	4th	Lost Grand Final
2016	17	10	1	6	40	25	+15	31	Runner-up	Lost Preliminary Final
2017	18	8	2	8	35	31	+4	26	5th	Did not qualify
2018	18	12	2	4	52	24	+28	38	Runner-up	Lost Grand Final
2019	16	11	3	2	44	15	+29	36	3rd	Lost Preliminary Final
2020	8	4	2	2	19	12	+7	14	4th	Lost Semi-Final
2021	16	8	2	6	36	30	+6	26	4th	COVID (No Finals)
2022	--	--	--	--	--	--	--	--	No Season	COVID
2023	--	--	--	--	--	--	--	--	No Season	COVID
2024	21	3	1	17	16	69	−53	10	7th	Did not qualify
2025									7th	Did not qualify

== Gallery ==
2007 MENS FIRST TEAM
