= Capital Football Men's Federation Cup =

Federation Cup
- Organiser(s): (Australian Capital Territory) Capital Football
- Founded: 1962; 64 years ago
- Teams: 20 (in 2022)
- Qualifier for: Australia Cup
- Current champions: Cooma Tigers in 2026 (3rd title)
- Most championships: Canberra Croatia (20 titles)
- Broadcaster: Capital Football on YouTube
- Website: capitalfootball.com.au
- 2026 Australia Cup preliminary rounds

The Federation Cup is a soccer competition established in 1962 that is held between clubs who are affiliated with Capital Football in the Australian Capital Territory (ACT) and surrounding areas of New South Wales. It is the premier cup competition in the region. Since 2014, the Federation Cup has concurrently served as the ACT competition for the preliminary rounds of the FFA Cup, now known as the Australia Cup, with the cup winner representing the ACT.

Canberra FC currently holds the record for most titles, having lifted the Cup 18 times. Canberra Croatia are the current cup holders, having lifted the Cup in 2025.

== Current Cup Competitions 2013-onwards ==
The current format is a qualifying competition for the FFA Cup, now known as the Australia Cup, where the winner qualifies for the Round of 32. Scheduling issues meant the 2014 winner was not decided until after the qualifier needed to be named. To overcome this Capital Football announced that the 2014 winner of the ACTs pre-season competition was to be the ACTs qualifier in 2014. However, Tuggeranong United as the 2013 Federation Cup winners successfully appealed to Capital Football to qualify them as ACTs 2014 FFA Cup entrant. The 2014 winner – Belconnen United – entered into the 2015 FFA Cup preliminary rounds in a later round than the rest of the Capital Football NPL sides.

Competition and Year	Linked FFA Cup Qualification	Winner	Score	Runners-up
Federation Cup 2013	2014 FFA Cup Round of 32	Tuggeranong United	3–2 (a.e.t.)	Cooma FC
Federation Cup 2014	Not applicable	Belconnen United	3–2	Canberra FC
Federation Cup 2015	2015 FFA Cup preliminary rounds	Gungahlin United	1–0 (a.e.t.)	Belconnen United
Federation Cup 2016	2016 FFA Cup preliminary rounds	Canberra Olympic	3–1	Tigers FC
Federation Cup 2017	2017 FFA Cup preliminary rounds	Canberra Olympic	2–0	Tuggeranong United
Federation Cup 2018	2018 FFA Cup preliminary rounds	Canberra FC	3–2	Gungahlin United
Federation Cup 2019	2019 FFA Cup preliminary rounds	Cooma Tigers	0–0 (4–2(p))	Canberra FC
2020	Federation Cup and 2020 FFA Cup cancelled due to the COVID-19 pandemic in Australia.			
Federation Cup 2021	2021 FFA Cup preliminary rounds	Cooma Tigers	5–2	Monaro Panthers
Federation Cup 2022	2022 Australia Cup preliminary rounds	Monaro Panthers	3–1 (a.e.t.)	West Canberra Wanderers
Federation Cup 2023	2023 Australia Cup preliminary rounds	Canberra Croatia	4–2	Canberra Olympic
Federation Cup 2024	2024 Australia Cup preliminary rounds	O'Connor Knights	4–2	Monaro Panthers
Federation Cup 2025	2025 Australia Cup preliminary rounds	Canberra Croatia	2–1 (a.e.t.)	Queanbeyan City
Federation Cup 2026	2026 Australia Cup preliminary rounds	Cooma Tigers	5–1	Canberra Croatia

== Previous Winners 1962–2012 ==
Year	Winner	Score	Runners-up
1962	SC Hope	3–0	Concordia
1963	Concordia	4–4; 1–0 (Note: Replay match, after original match was drawn)	SC Hope
1964	SC Hope	2–1	Kosciusko
1965	Juventus	3–2	SC Hope
1966	Juventus	4–0	SC Hope
1967	Juventus	1–1; 3–0	Croatia Deakin
1968	Juventus	1–0	Olympic
1969	Queanbeyan Macedonia	3–1 (a.e.t.)	Juventus
1970	Turner Eagles	2–0	Croatia Deakin
1971	Griffith United	5–1	Forrest United
1972	Croatia Deakin	1–0	Juventus
1973	abandoned (Note: Match was abandoned after 20 minutes, with the score at 0–0 after crowd trouble following a red card. The match was not replayed and the Cup was not awarded.)		
1974	Croatia Deakin	2–1 (a.e.t.)	Forrest United
1975	West Woden Juventus	2–1	Croatia Deakin
1976	Inter Monaro	3–1	Downer Olympic
1977	Inter Monaro	2–1	Canberra United
1978	Croatia Deakin	2–1	West Woden Juventus
1979	Downer Olympic	2–0	Canberra City Roos
1980	West Woden Juventus	2–1	Croatia Deakin
1981	Downer Olympic	2–1 (4–3(p))	ANU FC
1982	West Woden Juventus	2–1 (a.e.t.)	Belconnen United
1983	Downer Olympic	1–0	Croatia Deakin
1984	Croatia Deakin	2–1	Griffith City
1985	Croatia Deakin	4–3 (a.e.t.)	West Woden Juventus
1986	Croatia Deakin	1–1 (3–2(p))	Juventus

Year	Winner	Score	Runners-up
1987	CCAE	2–1 (a.e.t.)	Juventus
1988	Juventus	4–1	CCAE
1989	Tuggeranong United	3–0	Canberra City Concordia
1990	Belconnen United	3–0	UCU Pumas
1991	Canberra City	2–0	Canberra Croatia
1992	Belconnen United	3–3 (5–4(p))	Olympic
1993	Tuggeranong United	1–0	Canberra Deakin
1994	Tuggeranong United	2–1	Canberra Deakin
1995	Canberra Deakin	1–0	Tuggeranong United
1996	Weston Creek Royals	3–0	Belconnen United
1997	Canberra Olympic	3–0	Belconnen United
1998	Belconnen United	2–1	Canberra City
1999	Canberra Olympic	6–2	Canberra Deakin
2000	Gungahlin Juventus	7–1	Tuggeranong United
2001	Gungahlin Juventus	unknown	Capital City Suns
2002	Canberra Deakin	6–1	Gungahlin Juventus
2003	Gungahlin Juventus	2–1	Belconnen United
2004	Canberra Deakin	2–0	Capital City Suns
2005	Canberra City	3–1	Cooma Tigers
2006	Canberra FC	4–1	Cooma Tigers
2007	Canberra FC	7–1	ANU FC
2008	O'Connor Knights	3–2	Canberra FC
2009	Canberra FC	2–2 (4–1(p))	Canberra Olympic
2010	Canberra FC	3–2	Goulburn Strikers
2011	Canberra FC	5–0	Belconnen United
2012	Canberra FC	5–4 (a.e.t.)	Cooma Tigers

== All-time record ==
All time winners list including Pre-NPL era and NPL era (1962 to current).

Federation Cup winners
Club	Winners	Years
Canberra FC / Canberra Croatia	20	1962, 1964, 1972, 1974, 1978, 1984, 1985, 1986, 1995, 2002, 2004, 2006, 2007, 2009, 2010, 2011, 2012, 2018, 2023, 2025
West Woden / Gungahlin Juventus	10	1965, 1966, 1967, 1975, 1980, 1982, 1988, 2000, 2001, 2003
Canberra Olympic	7	1979, 1981, 1983, 1997, 1999, 2016, 2017
Belconnen United	4	1990, 1992, 1998, 2014
Tuggeranong United	4	1989, 1993, 1994, 2013
Canberra City	3	1963 (as Concordia), 1991, 2005
Monaro Panthers	3	1976, 1977, 2022
Cooma Tigers	2	2019, 2021, 2026
O'Connor Knights	2	2008, 2024
Griffith United	1	1971
Gungahlin United	1	2015
Queanbeyan City	1	1969
Turner Eagles	1	1970
Weston Molonglo FC	1	1996
UCU Pumas	1	1987 (as CCAE)

== See also ==
- Soccer in the Australian Capital Territory
- Sport in the Australian Capital Territory
