= Tigers FC (Australia) =

Australian semi-professional football club

- Full name: Tigers Football Club
- Nickname: Tigers
- Founded: 1952
- Ground: AIS Field 2 Oval
- Capacity: 1,000
- Coordinates: 36°13′52.5″S 149°7′15.5″E
- Manager: Ali Riza Efe
- League: NPL Capital Football
- 2026: 3rd of 11
- Website: https://www.tigers-fc.com.au/
Home colours	Away colours

Tigers Football Club is an Australian semi-professional association football club previously based in Cooma, New South Wales. Now based in Canberra (ACT) The club is affiliated with Capital Football and currently competes in the National Premier Leagues 1 ACT and the Community State Leagues Capital Football in the ACT. Their home venue is AIS Field 2 Oval.

== History ==
Cooma Football Club was formed in 1952 by the workforce of the Snowy Mountains Hydro Scheme which attracted people from all over the world to the Australian Alps. Cooma FC is one of the oldest continuous football clubs in Australia.

In 2014, Cooma won the league premiership for the first time in the club's sixty-three-year history. The Tigers defeated title rivals Belconnen United 3–0 at home to clinch the title.

In 2015, Cooma FC announced a partnership with club Brindabella Blues FC. The partnership saw Brindabella Blues administer and run the U12, U14, U16 and U18 NPL programs out of Brindabella's home at Calwell District Playing Fields while the U20 and senior NPL programs remain based in Cooma with Cooma FC. At the time the NPL games were split between Calwell playing fields and Nijong, with U12, U14 and U16 playing at Calwell and U18, U20 and first grade playing at Nijong Oval Cooma, Capital Football Board insisted that the two clubs must form a new entity, the two clubs agreed to form Tigers FC as their NPL club.

In 2016, the Tigers fell short of winning the league title by three points as Canberra Olympic claimed the premiership. In the finals series Cooma lost the major semi-final to Olympic 5–3 on penalties after the two sides drew 2–2 after 120 minutes. The Tigers had looked certain to advance to the grand final as they headed into the final minutes of the match 2–1 up but a late goal by Colombian striker Phillippe Bernabo-Madrid sent the match into extra time. Cooma advanced to the preliminary final against Canberra FC but a number of injuries in the lead up to the match saw a depleted Tigers lose the match 1–5 and end the club's season. Cooma also missed out on reaching the round of 32 of the FFA Cup in 2016 when they lost the Capital Football Federation Cup final to Olympic 1–3 at Deakin Stadium on 18 June 2016.

Tigers won the NPL ACT men's title twice in 2019 and 2021, as well as reaching the Australia Cup knockout stage against APIA.

In 2022 Cooma Tigers FC rebranded itself as Canberra Tigers, then Tigers FC, they relocated to Canberra under a new logo and jersey colours.

== Current squad ==
As of 8th May 2025

Note: Flags indicate national team as defined under FIFA eligibility rules; some limited exceptions apply. Players may hold more than one non-FIFA nationality.

No.	Pos.	Nation	Player
2	DF	AUS	Noah Steinacker
3	DF	AUS	Michael Southam
4	DF	AUS	Marko Miluntovic
5	DF	AUS	Shandon Whitehead
8	DF	AUS	Sam Whithear
9	DF	AUS	Nikolas Popovich
10	DF	USA	Lukman Ahmed-Shaibu
11	DF	AUS	Nikola Taneski
13	DF	AUS	Shandon Whitehead
14	MF	JPN	Tomohiro Ogowa
18	MF	AUS	Angus Pitkin
19	FW	AUS	Archie McGregor
22	MF	SLE	Augustine Bangura
23	DF	AUS	Nathan Megic
29	MF	AUS	Hamish Wales
30	FW	SSD	William Akio
35	DF	AUS	Samson Carr
99	GK	AUS	Willem Lejeune
—	DF	AUS	Nicholas Pulciani
—	DF	AUS	Angus Wales
—	MF	AUS	Elliot Alberto
—	FW	AUS	Zachary Ilijoski
—	FW	AUS	Cooper Heagney
—	DF	AUS	Conor Moir

== Staff ==
=== Club management ===
As of 4th of February 2022

Club Management
Position	Name
Club President	(Australia) Nic Tonini
Head Coach	(Turkey) Ali Efe
23 Head Coach	(Australia) Tom Crossley
Technical Director	(Australia) Ryan Grogan

== Club identity ==
=== Club colours ===
Cooma FC has traditionally used yellow and black, including at a community level. The colours are now Orange and Black following their club relocating to Canberra and rebrand in 2022 to Tigers FC.

=== Club Grounds ===
Their home previous home ground in Cooma was Nijong Oval, located in the middle of the town. Now having relocated to Canberra they play at the AIS, whilst juniors play at Ainslie Enclosed Oval.

== Honours ==
- Women's State League 2

Premiers (1): 2014

- Women's State League 3

Premiers (1): 2021
Champions (1):2021 (finals cancelled due to COVID pandemic)

- Men's State League 1

Premiers (1): 2018

- Men's State League 2

Premiers (1): 2016

- NPL Men's ACT

Premiers (2): 20192021
Champions (1): 2025

- Capital Football Federation Cup

Champions (3): 2019, 2021, 2026
Runner-up (5): 2005, 2006, 2012, 2013, 2016
