= Capital Football State League =

Capital Football State League ACT
- Founded: 1983 (43 years ago) (as Division 3)
- Country: Australia
- State: (Australian Capital Territory) ACT (New South Wales) NSW
- Confederation: AFC
- Number of clubs: 60: Division One: 10; Division Two: 10; Division Three: 10; Division Four: 10; Division Five: 10; Division Six: 10
- Level on pyramid: 4–10 (notionally)
- Domestic cup(s): Australia Cup; Federation Cup

The Capital Football State League is an amateur soccer league system based in the Canberra, Australian Capital Territory (ACT) region. The league system is organised and run by Capital Football. It represents levels three and below for men in the ACT league pyramid beneath the ACT NPL 1 and level 3 and below for women beneath the ACT NPL W.

== Men's structure ==
The ACT State League men's structure is broken into fourteen leagues composed of ten All-Age State League Competitions and four age restricted Masters Competitions. The system consists of a pyramid of leagues. Divisions 1-4 are bound together by the principle of promotion and relegation. The most successful club in each league rises to a higher league, whilst the club that finishes at the bottom of their league finds itself sinking down a level. Division 5 and 6 are open leagues for casual players.

Level	State League Division(s)
3	State League 1; 10 clubs
4	State League 2; 10 clubs ↓ 1 relegation
5	State League 3; 10 clubs ↑ 1 promotion ↓ 1 relegation
6	State League 4; 10 clubs ↑ 1 promotion ↓ 1 relegation
7	State League 5; 10 clubs Open
8	State League 6 10 clubs Open
Masters	Masters several divisions

== Women's structure ==
The ACT State League women's structure is broken into five leagues and a masters league, at the top of the system is Division 1 (sometimes referred to as Women's Capital League), containing 8 clubs, of which, as of 2020, all eight are based in Canberra, Australian Capital Territory. Divisions 2 to 5 contain between 8 and 10 clubs each with fifteen clubs coming from Canberra and three coming from NSW (Queanbeyan, Yass and Palerang). In 2020 Capital Football restarted the Women's Masters League, containing 5 teams. The Women's Masters is predominantly for women of at least 35 years of age.

Level	League(s)/Division(s)
3	Division 1; 8 teams
4	Division 2; 10 teams
5	Division 3; 9 teams
6	Division 4; 10 teams
7	Division 5; 9 teams
Masters	Masters; 5 teams

== See also ==
- League system, for a list of similar systems in other countries
- Australian soccer league system, for an overview of Australia's league systems across the nation
- Soccer in the Australian Capital Territory, for an overview of the entire soccer scene in the ACT
