= 2024 Australia Cup preliminary rounds =

Qualification rounds for 2024 season of Australian soccer competition

Tournament details
- Country: Australia
- Teams: 761

The 2024 Australia Cup preliminary rounds were the qualifying competition to decide 24 of the 32 teams to take part in the 2024 Australia Cup. The competition commenced in February.

== Schedule ==
The fixtures for the competition were as follows.

| Round | Number of fixtures | Clubs | A-League | ACT | NSW | NNSW | NT | QLD | SA | TAS | VIC | WA |
|---|---|---|---|---|---|---|---|---|---|---|---|---|
| First round | 58 + 21 byes | 759 → 701 | — | — | — | — | — | 10 Feb | — | — | 9–12 Feb | — |
| Second round | 136 + 44 byes | 701 → 565 | — | — | 9–10 Mar | 17 Feb–17 Mar | — | 9–27 Feb | — | — | 23–26 Feb | 24–25 Feb |
| Third round | 205 + 6 byes | 565 → 360 | — | 13–24 Mar | 19–21 Mar | 24 Feb–17 Apr | — | 10 Feb–3 Apr | 16–18 Feb | 9–11 Mar | 8–11 Mar | 15–17 Mar |
| Fourth round | 173 + 1 bye | 360 → 187 | — | 9–18 Apr | 9–24 Apr | 2 Mar–15 May | 19 Mar–16 Apr | 6–17 Apr | 15–17 Mar | 29 Mar–1 Apr | 27 Mar–10 Apr | 25–28 Apr |
| Fifth round | 87 + 1 bye | 187 → 100 | — | 30 Apr–14 May | 23 Apr–8 May | 10 Mar–22 May | 16–23 Apr | 30 Apr–18 May | 13 Apr | 27 Apr | 22 Apr–1 May | 11–12 May |
| Sixth round | 44 | 100 → 56 | — | 21–23 May | 14–29 May | 8 Jun | 7–11 May | 21 May–1 Jun | 7–15 May | 17–19 May | 14–28 May | 28 May |
| Seventh round | 22 | 56 → 34 | — | 8 Jun | 28 May–5 Jun | 10–12 Jun | 28 May | 11–15 Jun | 5–12 Jun | 10 Jun | 11–18 Jun | 12 Jun |
| Play-off round | 2 | 34 → 32 | 23–24 Jul | — | — | — | — | — | — | — | — | — |

== Format ==
The preliminary rounds structures are as follows, and refer to the different levels in the unofficial Australian soccer league system:

- First round:

- 2 Queensland clubs from Regional Queensland level 5 entered this stage.
- 135 Victorian clubs from level 7 and below entered this stage.

- Second round:

- 117 New South Wales clubs level 5 and below entered this stage.
- 49 Northern New South Wales clubs level 4 and below entered this stage.
- 38 Queensland clubs (1 from the previous round and 37 teams from levels 5 and below) entered this stage.
- 78 Victorian clubs progressed to this stage.
- 34 Western Australian clubs from level 5 and below entered this stage.

- Third round:

- 12 Australian Capital Territory clubs from level 3 and below entered this stage.
- 102 New South Wales clubs (73 from the previous round and 29 teams from levels 3–4) entered this stage.
- 40 Northern New South Wales clubs (31 from the previous round and 9 teams from level 3) entered this stage.
- 84 Queensland clubs (19 from the previous round and 65 teams from levels 4 and below) entered this stage.
- 41 South Australian clubs from level 3 and below entered this stage.
- 10 Tasmanian clubs from level 3 and below entered this stage.
- 86 Victorian clubs (39 from the previous round and 47 teams from levels 5 and 6) entered this stage.
- 42 Western Australian clubs (18 from the previous round and 24 teams from levels 3 and 4) entered this stage.

- Fourth round:

- 16 Australian Capital Territory clubs (8 from the previous round and 8 teams from level 2) entered this stage.
- 64 New South Wales clubs (51 from the previous round and 13 teams from level 2) entered this stage.
- 32 Northern New South Wales clubs (20 from the previous round and 12 teams from level 2) entered this stage.
- 11 Northern Territory clubs from level 2 entered this stage.
- 64 Queensland clubs (42 from the previous round and 22 teams from levels 2 and 3) entered this stage.
- 32 South Australian clubs (21 from the previous round and 11 teams from level 2) entered this stage.
- 16 Tasmanian clubs (6 from the previous round, 2 league winners from level 3, and 8 teams from level 2) entered this stage.
- 80 Victorian clubs (43 from the previous round and 37 teams from levels 2–4) entered this stage.
- 32 Western Australian clubs (21 from the previous round and 11 teams from level 2) entered this stage.

- Fifth round:

- 8 Australian Capital Territory clubs progressed to this stage.
- 32 New South Wales clubs progressed to this stage.
- 16 Northern New South Wales clubs progressed to this stage.
- 7 Northern Territory clubs (6 from the previous round and 1 team from level 2) entered this stage.
- 32 Queensland clubs progressed to this stage.
- 16 South Australian clubs progressed to this stage.
- 8 Tasmanian clubs progressed to this stage.
- 40 Victorian clubs progressed to this stage.
- 16 Western Australian clubs progressed to this stage.

- Sixth round:

- 4 Australian Capital Territory clubs progressed to this stage.
- 16 New South Wales clubs progressed to this stage.
- 8 Northern New South Wales clubs progressed to this stage.
- 4 Northern Territory clubs progressed to this stage.
- 16 Queensland clubs progressed to this stage.
- 8 South Australian clubs progressed to this stage.
- 4 Tasmanian clubs progressed to this stage.
- 20 Victorian clubs progressed to this stage.
- 8 Western Australian clubs progressed to this stage.

- Seventh round:

- 2 Australian Capital Territory clubs progressed to this stage, which doubled as the Final of the Federation Cup.
- 8 New South Wales clubs progressed to this stage. The 4 winners also qualified for the final rounds of the Waratah Cup.
- 4 Northern New South Wales clubs progressed to this stage. The 2 winners also qualified for the Final of the NNSWF State Cup.
- 2 Northern Territory clubs progressed to this stage, which doubled as the Final of the NT Australia Cup.
- 8 Queensland clubs will progress to this stage; 1 from Regional Queensland, and 7 from South East Queensland. The 4 winners also qualified for the semi-finals of the Kappa Queensland Cup.
- 4 South Australian clubs progressed to this stage. The 2 winners also qualified for the Final of the Federation Cup.
- 2 Tasmanian clubs progressed to this stage, which doubled as the Grand Final of the Milan Lakoseljac Cup.
- 10 Victorian clubs progressed to this stage. The 5 winners also qualified for the final rounds of the Dockerty Cup.
- 4 Western Australian clubs progressed to this stage. The 2 winners also qualified for the Final of the Football West State Cup.

- Play-off round:

- The four lowest-ranked teams in the 2023–24 A-League Men played-off for two spots in the Round of 32.

== Key to abbreviations ==
| Federation | Zone |
|---|---|
| ACT = Australian Capital Territory | |
| NSW = New South Wales | |
| NNSW = Northern New South Wales | NTH = North; STH = South |
| NT = Northern Territory | ASP = Alice Springs; DAR = Darwin |
| QLD = Queensland | CC = Central Coast; FNG = Far North and Gulf; NTH = Northern; REG = Regional Queensland; SEQ = South East Queensland; WB = Wide Bay; WC = Whitsunday Coast |
| SA = South Australia | |
| TAS = Tasmania | |
| VIC = Victoria | |
| WA = Western Australia | |

== First round ==
| Fed. | Zone | Tie no | Home team (Tier) | Score | Away team (Tier) |
Queensland
| QLD | FNG | 1 | Edge Hill United (5) | 3–3† | Leichhardt (5) |
Leichhardt advance 4–2 on penalties
Victoria
| VIC | – | 2 | Bell Park (8) | 2–0 | Surfside Waves (9) |
| VIC | – | 3 | Epsom (10) | w/o | Maidstone United (9) |
| VIC | – | 4 | Melbourne City (8) | 1–3 | Altona North (7) |
| VIC | – | 5 | Mount Eliza (9) | w/o | South Yarra (7) |
| VIC | – | 6 | Portland Panthers (10) | 0–7 | Fawkner (8) |
| VIC | – | 7 | Spring Hills (9) | 4–1 | Tullamarine (9) |
| VIC | – | 8 | St Albans Gospic Bears (11) | 0–6 | Western Eagles (7) |
| VIC | – | 9 | Mount Waverley City (9) | 2–1 | Boronia (8) |
| VIC | – | 10 | Doreen United (9) | 3–1 | Whitehorse United (9) |
| VIC | – | 11 | Ballarat (9) | w/o | Keysborough (8) |
| VIC | – | 12 | East Bentleigh (9) | 4–3 | Surf Coast (8) |
| VIC | – | 13 | Heatherton United (7) | 2–1 | Old Trinity Grammarians (9) |
| VIC | – | 14 | Hampton Park United Sparrows (8) | 12–0 | Brighton (8) |
| VIC | – | 15 | Epping City (7) | 4–0 | Thornbury Athletic (8) |
| VIC | – | 16 | Noble Park United (7) | 3–0 | Docklands Athletic (8) |
| VIC | – | 17 | Sandringham (7) | 3–3† | Riversdale (8) |
Riversdale advance 7–6 on penalties
| VIC | – | 18 | Spring Gully United (10) | 1–0 | Birrarung (9) |
| VIC | – | 19 | Moonee Ponds United (8) | 9–1 | Endeavour Hills (9) |
| VIC | – | 20 | ETA Buffalo Club of Victoria (9) | 0–7 | Templestowe Wolves (9) |
| VIC | – | 21 | Springvale City (8) | 5–2 | Lilydale Montrose United (9) |
| VIC | – | 22 | Shepparton (10) | w/o | Pakenham United (9) |
| VIC | – | 23 | Sebastopol Vikings (7) | 2–2† | Keilor Wolves (8) |
Sebastapol Vikings advance 5–4 on penalties
| VIC | – | 24 | Watsonia Heights (8) | 2–0 | Moonee Valley Knights (8) |
| VIC | – | 25 | West Preston (8) | 4–3 | Middle Park (7) |
| VIC | – | 26 | Endeavour United (8) | 10–0 | Tarneit United (9) |
| VIC | – | 27 | Lara United (9) | 1–4 | Williamstown (7) |

| Fed. | Zone | Tie no | Home team (Tier) | Score | Away team (Tier) |
|---|---|---|---|---|---|
| VIC | – | 28 | Laverton (7) | 7–1 | Monash University (8) |
| VIC | – | 29 | Westside Strikers Caroline Springs (8) | 1–1† | Mentone (8) |
Westside Strikers Caroline Springs advance 11–10 on penalties
| VIC | – | 30 | Shepparton South (10) | 0–1 | Baxter (8) |
| VIC | – | 31 | Mitchell Rangers (9) | 3–4 | Sale United (10) |
| VIC | – | 32 | Lyndale United (8) | 4–0 | Mount Martha (9) |
| VIC | – | 33 | Sunbury United (7) | 3–0 | Gisborne (9) |
| VIC | – | 34 | Diamond Valley United (7) | 3–1 | Ringwood City (8) |
| VIC | – | 35 | Aspendale (9) | 3–4† | Knox United (8) |
| VIC | – | 36 | Wyndham (9) | 1–2 | Bendigo City (9) |
| VIC | – | 37 | Falcons 2000 (10) | 0–12 | Rowville Eagles (7) |
| VIC | – | 38 | Albert Park (8) | 3–0 | Meadow Park (9) |
| VIC | – | 39 | Rosebud (9) | 0–2 | Greenvale United (8) |
| VIC | – | 40 | Truganina (8) | 1–5 | Yarra Jets (8) |
| VIC | – | 41 | Noble Hurricanes (9) | 0–2 | Keon Park (9) |
| VIC | – | 42 | Noble Park (9) | w/o | Breakwater Eagles (10) |
| VIC | – | 43 | Plenty Valley Lions (8) | 2–1 | Moreland United (8) |
| VIC | – | 44 | Moreland Eagles (9) | 2–10 | Old Ivanhoe (9) |
| VIC | – | 45 | Brunswick Zebras (7) | w/o | Forest Rangers (10) |
| VIC | – | 46 | Heidelberg Eagles (7) | 8–0 | Casey Panthers (9) |
| VIC | – | 47 | Golden City (11) | 2–10 | Dandenong South (7) |
| VIC | – | 48 | Chelsea (8) | 4–0 | Alphington (9) |
| VIC | – | 49 | Barton United (9) | 0–4 | St Kilda (7) |
| VIC | – | 50 | Melbourne University (8) | 1–3 | Croydon City (8) |
| VIC | – | 51 | White Star Dandenong (7) | 8–2 | Castlemaine Goldfields (-) |
| VIC | – | 52 | Roxburgh Park United (9) | 2–8 | Glen Waverley (9) |
| VIC | – | 53 | Swinburne (-) | 2–4 | Fortuna 60 (10) |
| VIC | – | 54 | Melton Phoenix (8) | 4–1 | Elwood City (7) |
| VIC | – | 55 | Twin City Wanderers (-) | 3–2† | Leongatha Knights (-) |
| VIC | – | 56 | Waverley Wanderers (8) | 7–1 | Bunyip District (9) |
| VIC | – | 57 | East Kew (9) | 8–1 | Seaford United (9) |
| VIC | – | 58 | Cleeland United (9) | 1–4 | Manningham Juventus (8) |

Notes

- w/o = Walkover
- † = After Extra Time
- VIC Byes: Ashburton United (7), Balmoral (8), Barnstoneworth United (8), Barwon (8), Bundoora United (7), Darebin United (8), Deakin Ducks (9), Frankston Pines (7), Glenroy Lions (8), Heidelberg Stars (9), Kings Domain (8), La Trobe University (9), Monash City Villarreal (8), Monbulk Rangers (8), Old Melburnians (9), Point Cook (7), Sandown Lions (8), Shepparton United (10), Somerville Eagles (8), St Kevin's Old Boys (9), West Point (8).

== Second round ==
| Fed. | Zone | Tie no | Home team (Tier) | Score | Away team (Tier) |
New South Wales
| NSW | – | 1 | Albion Park White Eagles (5) | 4–0 | Wyoming (6) |
| NSW | – | 2 | Lilli Pilli (5) | 1–6 | Kanwal Warnervale Rovers (5) |
| NSW | – | 3 | Albion Park FC (7) | 4–3 | Marulan (5) |
| NSW | – | 4 | Kellyville Kolts (5) | 3–0 | Enfield Rovers (5) |
| NSW | – | 5 | Auburn FC (5) | 4–3† | Brighton Heat (5) |
| NSW | – | 6 | Lane Cove (5) | 4–2 | Winston Hills (5) |
| NSW | – | 7 | Phoenix FC (5) | 5–3 | Gunners (5) |
| NSW | – | 8 | Fairfield Eagles (5) | 0–7 | Carlton Rovers (5) |
| NSW | – | 9 | Fairfield Patrician Brothers (5) | 2–3 | Como Jannali (5) |
| NSW | – | 10 | Normanhurst Eagles (5) | 5–0 | Shoalhaven United (5) |
| NSW | – | 11 | Figtree FC (7) | 1–2 | Kogarah Waratah (5) |
| NSW | – | 12 | Gosford City (6) | 4–3 | Liverpool Olympic (5) |
| NSW | – | 13 | Avoca (5) | 3–1 | Lokomotiv Cove (6) |
| NSW | – | 14 | Roselands (6) | 0–6 | Hurstville Glory (6) |
| NSW | – | 15 | Unanderra Hearts (6) | 5–3 | Ropes Crossing Strikers (5) |
| NSW | – | 16 | Shellharbour (5) | 3–1 | Tarrawanna Blueys (5) |
| NSW | – | 17 | MRP FC (6) | 5–0 | Fairfield Bulls (5) |
| NSW | – | 18 | Padstow United (5) | 1–3 | Coogee United (5) |
| NSW | – | 19 | Roselea (6) | 1–2 | Umina United (6) |
| NSW | – | 20 | St Michaels (7) | 2–1 | East Gosford (5) |
| NSW | – | 21 | Putney Rangers (6) | 1–2 | Killarney District (5) |
| NSW | – | 22 | Kemps Creek United (5) | 0–1 | Narellan Rangers (5) |
| NSW | – | 23 | Southern & Ettalong United (5) | 4–1 | Arncliffe Aurora (5) |
| NSW | – | 24 | Warilla Wanderers (6) | 6–4 | Peakhurst United (6) |
| NSW | – | 25 | Rouse Hill Rams (5) | 1–9 | Lindfield (5) |
| NSW | – | 26 | Mascot Kings (6) | 1–2 | Eschol Park (5) |
| NSW | – | 27 | South Coast United (5) | 3–2 | The Ponds (5) |
| NSW | – | 28 | Bulli (5) | 3–0 | Holroyd Rangers (5) |
| NSW | – | 29 | Miranda Magpies (5) | 0–2 | Balmain & District (5) |
| NSW | – | 30 | Wollongong Olympic (5) | 14–0 | MBK United (5) |
| NSW | – | 31 | St Marys (6) | 0–16 | Woongarrah Wildcats (5) |
| NSW | – | 32 | Tahmoor Taipans (5) | 3–4 | Hills Spirit (5) |
| NSW | – | 33 | St Ives (6) | 0–4 | Ourimbah United (6) |
| NSW | – | 34 | Northbridge (5) | 7–0 | Ryde Saints (6) |
| NSW | – | 35 | Coniston (5) | 6–0 | Glebe Wanderers (5) |
| NSW | – | 36 | Forest Killarney (5) | 2–0 | Connells Point Rovers (5) |
| NSW | – | 37 | Bathurst 75 (5) | 4–4† | Panorama (5) |
Panorama advance 4–3 on penalties
| NSW | – | 38 | Springwood United (5) | 0–8 | Gerringong Breakers (6) |
| NSW | – | 39 | Caringbah Redbacks (5) | 0–2 | Randwick City (5) |
| NSW | – | 40 | Narrabeen (5) | 2–0 | Strathfield (5) |
| NSW | – | 41 | Orange Waratah (5) | 1–2 | Yoogali FC (5) |
| NSW | – | 42 | Western Condors (5) | w/o | St George Basin (5) |
| NSW | – | 43 | IFS Wolves (7) | 0–10 | Waverley Old Boys (5) |
| NSW | – | 44 | Glebe Gorillas (5) | 5–1 | Central Sydney Wolves (5) |
Northern New South Wales
| NNSW | NTH | 45 | Boambee (-) | 5–0 | Souths United (-) |
| NNSW | NTH | 46 | Alstonville (-) | 2–1 | Woolgoolga United (-) |
| NNSW | NTH | 47 | Moore Creek (-) | 3–1 | Sawtell (-) |
| NNSW | NTH | 48 | Coffs City United (-) | 2–3 | South Armidale United (-) |
| NNSW | NTH | 49 | Northern Storm (-) | 2–1 | Armidale City Westside (-) |
| NNSW | NTH | 50 | Narrabri FC (-) | 1–4 | Westlawn Tigers (-) |
| NNSW | STH | 51 | Hamilton Azzurri (4) | 2–0 | Medowie (6) |
| NNSW | STH | 52 | Bolwarra Lorn Junior (5) | 6–1 | Mayfield United Junior (5) |
| NNSW | STH | 53 | Newcastle Suns (4) | 5–1 | Barnsley United (6) |
| NNSW | STH | 54 | Greta Branxton (6) | 1–5 | Stockton Sharks (5) |
| NNSW | STH | 55 | University of Newcastle (-) | 2–5 | Newcastle Croatia (5) |
| NNSW | STH | 56 | Westlakes Wildcats (4) | 3–5 | Merewether Advance (5) |
| NNSW | STH | 57 | Cardiff City (4) | 5–1 | Charlestown Junior (-) |
| NNSW | STH | 58 | Croudace Bay United (-) | 2–3 | Kotara South (4) |
| NNSW | STH | 59 | Minmi (4) | 0–5 | Mayfield United Senior (4) |
| NNSW | STH | 60 | Garden Suburb (-) | 2–3 | Warners Bay (4) |
| NNSW | STH | 61 | Dudley Redhead Senior (4) | 12–1 | Bellbird Junior (6) |
| NNSW | STH | 62 | North United Wolves (5) | 2–1 | South Maitland (5) |
Queensland
| QLD | FNG | 63 | Marlin Coast Rangers (5) | 2–0 | Innisfail United (5) |
| QLD | FNG | 64 | Stratford Dolphins (5) | 2–3† | Redlynch Strikers United (5) |
| QLD | FNG | 65 | Southside Comets (5) | 12–0 | Atherton Eagles (6) |
| QLD | FNG | 66 | Mareeba United (5) | 1–3 | Leichhardt (5) |
| QLD | NTH | 67 | Brothers Townsville (5) | 9–0 | Rebels (5) |
| QLD | NTH | 68 | Estates (5) | 1–2 | Burdekin (5) |
| QLD | NTH | 69 | Riverway JCU (5) | 5–1 | Townsville Warriors (5) |

| Fed. | Zone | Tie no | Home team (Tier) | Score | Away team (Tier) |
|---|---|---|---|---|---|
| QLD | NTH | 70 | MA Olympic (5) | 3–1 | Saints Eagles Souths (5) |
| QLD | WB | 71 | Kawungan Sandy Straits Jets (5) | 1–4 | Sunbury Blues (5) |
| QLD | WC | 72 | Magpies (5) | 4–2 | Mackay Lions (5) |
| QLD | SEQ | 73 | Brisbane Knights (5) | 10–0 | Pimpana City (6) |
| QLD | SEQ | 74 | Mudgeeraba (6) | 0–6 | Surfers Paradise Apollo (5) |
| QLD | SEQ | 75 | Newmarket (5) | 6–2 | Bethania Rams (8) |
| QLD | SEQ | 76 | Bribie Island (-) | 3–2 | Warwick Wolves (-) |
| QLD | SEQ | 77 | Southport Warriors (5) | 1–0 | Logan Metro (6) |
| QLD | SEQ | 78 | Pine Rivers Athletic (7) | 4–1 | Legends (6) |
| QLD | SEQ | 79 | Narangba Eagles (7) | 3–1 | Old Bridge Salisbury (7) |
| QLD | SEQ | 80 | Ormeau (5) | 9–2 | Brighton Bulldogs (6) |
| QLD | SEQ | 81 | Mt Gravatt Hawks (5) | 3–1 | Westside Grovely (7) |
Victoria
| VIC | – | 82 | Spring Hills (9) | 1–3 | East Kew (9) |
| VIC | – | 83 | Baxter (8) | 1–4† | Point Cook (7) |
| VIC | – | 84 | Fawkner (8) | 4–2† | Templestowe Wolves (9) |
| VIC | – | 85 | Bell Park (8) | 3–1 | St Kevin's Old Boys (9) |
| VIC | – | 86 | Heidelberg Stars (9) | 0–2 | West Preston (8) |
| VIC | – | 87 | Sebastapol Vikings (7) | 3–1 | Croydon City (8) |
| VIC | – | 88 | Old Ivanhoe (9) | 4–0 | Shepparton (-) |
| VIC | – | 89 | Brunswick Zebras (7) | 10–0 | Sale United (-) |
| VIC | – | 90 | Doreen United (9) | w/o | Breakwater Eagles (-) |
| VIC | – | 91 | Glenroy Lions (8) | 0–1† | Moonee Ponds United (8) |
| VIC | – | 92 | Altona North (7) | 0–1 | Rowville Eagles (7) |
| VIC | – | 93 | Somerville Eagles (8) | 3–6 | Waverley Wanderers (8) |
| VIC | – | 94 | Western Eagles (7) | 3–1 | Spring Gully United (-) |
| VIC | – | 95 | Yarra Jets (8) | 1–2 | Sunbury United (7) |
| VIC | – | 96 | Keon Park (9) | 0–2 | Dandenong South (7) |
| VIC | – | 97 | Plenty Valley Lions (8) | 9–0 | Twin City Wanderers (-) |
| VIC | – | 98 | Sandown Lions (8) | 2–5 | Manningham Juventus (8) |
| VIC | – | 99 | East Bentleigh (9) | 4–3† | Balmoral (8) |
| VIC | – | 100 | Mount Waverley City (9) | 2–0 | Deakin Ducks (9) |
| VIC | – | 101 | Westside Strikers Caroline Springs (8) | 6–3 | Fortuna 60 (-) |
| VIC | – | 102 | Epping City (7) | 1–1† | Watsonia Heights (8) |
Watsonia Heights advance 4–3 on penalties
| VIC | – | 103 | Shepparton United (-) | 0–3 | Melton Phoenix (8) |
| VIC | – | 104 | Greenvale United (8) | 4–1 | La Trobe University (9) |
| VIC | – | 105 | Diamond Valley United (7) | 2–3† | Frankston Pines (7) |
| VIC | – | 106 | Springvale City (8) | 1–6 | St Kilda (7) |
| VIC | – | 107 | Monash City Villarreal (8) | 2–6 | White Star Dandenong (7) |
| VIC | – | 108 | Barwon (8) | 0–3 | Williamstown (7) |
| VIC | – | 109 | Heatherton United (7) | 10–2 | Epsom (-) |
| VIC | – | 110 | Ashburton United (7) | 4–1 | Albert Park (8) |
| VIC | – | 111 | Endeavour United (8) | 4–0 | Knox United (8) |
| VIC | – | 112 | Glen Waverley (9) | 1–2 | Bendigo City (9) |
| VIC | – | 113 | West Point (8) | 7–1 | Barnstoneworth United (8) |
| VIC | – | 114 | Bundoora United (7) | 3–2 | Noble Park United (7) |
| VIC | – | 115 | Kings Domain (8) | 2–3 | Mount Eliza (9) |
| VIC | – | 116 | Hampton Park United Sparrows (8) | 3–4† | Laverton (7) |
| VIC | – | 117 | Old Melburnians (9) | 1–5 | Riversdale (8) |
| VIC | – | 118 | Lyndale United (8) | 2–0 | Monbulk Rangers (8) |
| VIC | – | 119 | Darebin United (8) | 1–0 | Ballarat (9) |
| VIC | – | 120 | Heidelberg Eagles (7) | 1–3 | Chelsea (8) |
Western Australia
| WA | – | 121 | South West Phoenix (6) | w/o | Baldivis (7) |
| WA | – | 122 | Perth AFC (7) | 2–1 | Jaguar (5) |
| WA | – | 123 | Maccabi (5) | 3–1 | North Beach (5) |
| WA | – | 124 | Armadale Christian (-) | 0–2 | Alkimos (7) |
| WA | – | 125 | Northern City (8) | 1–2 | Ellenbrook United (6) |
| WA | – | 126 | Black Stars (10) | 1–2 | Southern Spirit (6) |
| WA | – | 127 | Busselton City (-) | w/o | Dunsborough Town (-) |
| WA | – | 128 | Chipolopolo (10) | 2–7 | Cracovia (6) |
| WA | – | 129 | Spearwood Dalmatinac (8) | 2–1 | Morley-Windmills (5) |
| WA | – | 130 | Ballajura (6) | 6–3 | Kwinana United (5) |
| WA | – | 131 | Queens Park (7) | 3–0 | Port Kennedy (6) |
Queen's Park won on forfeit. The original match ended in a 1–1 draw, with Port Kennedy winning the penalty shootout 5–4
| WA | – | 132 | Hamersley United (6) | 2–4 | Wembley Downs (5) |
| WA | – | 133 | Bunbury Dynamos (-) | 0–1 | Football Margaret River (-) |
| WA | – | 134 | Manjimup Rovers (-) | 0–2 | Australind (-) |
| WA | – | 135 | North Perth United (5) | 6–0 | Woodvale (8) |
| WA | – | 136 | Stirling Panthers (6) | 4–4† | Kelmscott Roos (5) |
Stirling Panthers advance 5–4 on penalties

Notes

- w/o = Walkover
- † = After Extra Time
- NSW Byes: Austral (-), Belmore Eagles (-), Berkeley Vale (-), Blacktown Workers (-), Blue Mountains (-), Bonnet Bay (-), Bowral (-), Castle Hill RSL Rockets (-), Coledale Waves (-), Cooks River Tigers (-), Cringila Lions (-), Doonside Hawks (-), Eastern Creek Pioneers (-), Emu Plains (-), Fernhill (-), Forest Rangers (-), Goulburn Strikers (-), Gymea United (-), Hazelbrook (-), Hurlstone Park Wanderers (-), Lugarno (-), Manly Vale (-), Marayong (-), Marrickville (-), Moorebank Sports (-), Picton Rangers (-), Quakers Hill Junior (-), Wollongong United (-), Yagoona Lions (-).
- NNSW Byes: Coffs Coast Tigers (-), Demon Knights (-), East Armidale (-), Goonellabah (-), Inverell (-), Kempsey Saints (-), Kurri Kurri (6), Lambton Jaffas Junior (6), Mullumbimby Brunswick Valley (-), Nelson Bay (6), Oxley Vale Attunga (-), Port Saints (-), Urunga (-).
- WA Byes : Gortankaku (-), Joondanna Blues (7).

== Third round ==
| Fed. | Zone | Tie no | Home team (Tier) | Score | Away team (Tier) |
Australian Capital Territory
| ACT | – | 1 | Canberra White Eagles (3) | 3–6 | Belconnen United (3) |
| ACT | – | 2 | ANU FC (3) | 3–2 | Weston-Molonglo (4) |
| ACT | – | 3 | Brindabella Blues (3) | 1–2 | Wagga City Wanderers (3) |
| ACT | – | 4 | West Canberra Wanderers (3) | 4–4† | Yarabi (5) |
West Canberra Wanderers advance 4–2 on penalties
New South Wales
| NSW | – | 5 | Kellyville Kolts (5) | 3–2 | Nepean (3) |
| NSW | – | 6 | Cooks River Titans (5) | 2–4 | Phoenix FC (5) |
| NSW | – | 7 | Glebe Gorillas (5) | 6–1 | Eastern Creek Pioneers (5) |
| NSW | – | 8 | Berkeley Vale (5) | 7–0 | Parramatta (4) |
| NSW | – | 9 | Balmain & District (5) | 4–6 | Mounties Wanderers (3) |
| NSW | – | 10 | Como Jannali (5) | 0–6 | Albion Park White Eagles (5) |
| NSW | – | 11 | Wollongong Olympic (5) | 3–1† | Hurstville Zagreb (4) |
| NSW | – | 12 | Gosford City (6) | 1–10 | Hakoah Sydney City East (3) |
| NSW | – | 13 | Yoogali FC (5) | 0–2 | Inter Lions (3) |
| NSW | – | 14 | Bowral (5) | 0–10 | Waverley Old Boys (5) |
| NSW | – | 15 | Mt Druitt Town Rangers (3) | 5–2 | Canterbury Bankstown (3) |
| NSW | – | 16 | Coogee United (5) | 2–0 | Western Condors (5) |
| NSW | – | 17 | Woongarrah Wildcats (5) | 8–1 | Castle Hill RSL Rockets (5) |
| NSW | – | 18 | Bulli FC (5) | 4–3 | Belmore Eagles (5) |
| NSW | – | 19 | Blacktown Spartans (3) | 4–1 | Manly Vale (6) |
| NSW | – | 20 | Kogarah Waratah (5) | 2–3 | Bankstown City (3) |
| NSW | – | 21 | Rydalmere Lions (3) | 2–0 | Sydney University (4) |
| NSW | – | 22 | Granville Rage (4) | 2–3† | Austral SC (5) |
| NSW | – | 23 | Yagoona Lions (5) | 1–1† | Ourimbah United (6) |
Yagoona Lions advance 4–3 on penalties
| NSW | – | 24 | Northern Tigers (3) | 1–5 | Shellharbour (5) |
| NSW | – | 25 | Central Coast United (4) | 2–1 | Bankstown United (4) |
| NSW | – | 26 | Hazelbrook (5) | 5–1 | Hills Spirit (5) |
| NSW | – | 27 | Albion Park FC (7) | 0–5 | Narellan Rangers (5) |
| NSW | – | 28 | Cringila Lions (5) | 15–1 | Marrickville (5) |
| NSW | – | 29 | Eschol Park (5) | 3–1 | St Michaels (7) |
| NSW | – | 30 | UNSW FC (3) | 7–3 | Gymea United (5) |
| NSW | – | 31 | Forest Killarney (5) | 5–3 | South Coast United (5) |
| NSW | – | 32 | Coledale Waves (7) | 2–5† | Emu Plains (5) |
| NSW | – | 33 | Lane Cove (5) | 6–0 | Lugarno (6) |
| NSW | – | 34 | Hurstville Glory (6) | 2–4 | Panorama (5) |
| NSW | – | 35 | Unanderra Hearts (6) | 2–3 | Bonnet Bay (5) |
| NSW | – | 36 | Hurlstone Park Wanderers (5) | 5–2 | Auburn FC (5) |
| NSW | – | 37 | Warilla Wanderers (6) | 5–2† | Carlton Rovers (5) |
| NSW | – | 38 | Blacktown Workers (5) | 1–7 | Fraser Park (4) |
| NSW | – | 39 | MRP FC (6) | 1–6 | Gladesville Ryde Magic (4) |
| NSW | – | 40 | Goulburn Strikers (5) | 0–7 | Lindfield (5) |
| NSW | – | 41 | Dulwich Hill (3) | 4–0 | Fernhill (6) |
| NSW | – | 42 | Gerringong Breakers (6) | 1–2 | Camden Tigers (4) |
| NSW | – | 43 | Narrabeen (5) | 2–3 | SD Raiders (3) |
| NSW | – | 44 | Forest Rangers (5) | 1–1† | Umina United (6) |
Umina United advance 4–2 on penalties
| NSW | – | 45 | Southern & Ettalong United (5) | 1–2 | Randwick City (5) |
| NSW | – | 46 | Normanhurst Eagles (5) | 1–4 | Macarthur Rams (3) |
| NSW | – | 47 | Picton Rangers (6) | 0–6 | Northbridge (5) |
| NSW | – | 48 | Quakers Hill Junior (5) | 1–10 | Bonnyrigg White Eagles (3) |
| NSW | – | 49 | Wollongong United (5) | 2–0 | South Coast Flame (4) |
| NSW | – | 50 | Killarney District (5) | 0–3 | Kanwal Warnervale Rovers (5) |
| NSW | – | 51 | Moorebank Sports (5) | 1–9 | Inner West Hawks (4) |
| NSW | – | 52 | Coniston (5) | 3–2† | Prospect United (4) |
| NSW | – | 53 | Hawkesbury City (4) | 7–2 | Marayong (5) |
| NSW | – | 54 | Avoca (5) | 1–2 | Dunbar Rovers (3) |
| NSW | – | 55 | Blue Mountains (5) | 2–4† | Doonside Hawks (5) |
Northern New South Wales
| NNSW | NTH | 56 | Boambee (-) | 1–3 | Port Saints (-) |
| NNSW | NTH | 57 | Goonellabah (-) | 2–0 | Kempsey Saints (-) |
| NNSW | NTH | 58 | Northern Storm (-) | 3–1 | Moore Creek (-) |
| NNSW | NTH | 59 | Coffs Coast Tigers (-) | 3–0 | Westlawn Tigers (-) |
| NNSW | NTH | 60 | Mullumbimby Brunswick Valley (-) | 1–6 | Urunga (-) |
| NNSW | NTH | 61 | Oxley Vale Attunga (-) | 3–4 | Alstonville (-) |
| NNSW | NTH | 62 | Demon Knights (-) | 2–7 | Inverell (-) |
| NNSW | NTH | 63 | South Armidale United (-) | 8–1 | East Armidale (-) |
| NNSW | STH | 64 | Kurri Kurri (6) | 1–4 | Warners Bay (4) |
| NNSW | STH | 65 | Kahibah (3) | 2–2† | South Cardiff (3) |
South Cardiff advance 6–5 on penalties
| NNSW | STH | 66 | Wallsend (3) | 3–4 | Newcastle Croatia (5) |
| NNSW | STH | 67 | Dudley Redhead Senior (4) | 2–0 | North United Wolves (-) |
| NNSW | STH | 68 | Merewether Advance (5) | 0–1 | Mayfield United Senior (4) |
| NNSW | STH | 69 | Stockton Sharks (5) | 2–1 | Belmont Swansea United (3) |
| NNSW | STH | 70 | Lambton Jaffas Junior (6) | 1–9 | Newcastle Suns (4) |
| NNSW | STH | 71 | Nelson Bay (6) | 2–5 | Cardiff City (4) |
| NNSW | STH | 72 | Toronto Awaba Stags (3) | 4–5 | Hamilton Azzurri (4) |
| NNSW | STH | 73 | Bolwarra Lorn Junior (5) | 0–2 | West Wallsend (3) |
| NNSW | STH | 74 | Kotara South (4) | 2–1 | Singleton Strikers (3) |
| NNSW | STH | 75 | Thornton Redbacks (3) | 1–1† | Cessnock City Hornets (3) |
Cessnock City Hornets advance 4–3 on penalties
Queensland
| QLD | CC | 76 | Clinton (5) | 0–2 | Frenchville (5) |
| QLD | FNG | 77 | Leichhardt (5) | 2–1 | Marlin Coast Rangers (5) |
| QLD | FNG | 78 | Southside Comets (5) | 3–1 | Redlynch Strikers United (5) |
| QLD | NTH | 79 | Burdekin (5) | 4–2 | Riverway JCU (5) |
| QLD | NTH | 80 | Brothers Townsville (5) | 5–2 | MA Olympic (5) |
| QLD | WB | 81 | Across The Waves (5) | 6–0 | Sunbury Blues (5) |
| QLD | WC | 82 | Whitsunday United (5) | 1–5 | Mackay Rangers (5) |
| QLD | WC | 83 | Magpies FC (5) | 10–1 | Mackay Wanderers (5) |
| QLD | SEQ | 84 | Southport Warriors (5) | 1–2 | Burleigh Heads (5) |
| QLD | SEQ | 85 | Bribie Island (-) | 2–10 | Pacific Pines (6) |
| QLD | SEQ | 86 | Willowburn (5) | 1–4 | Magic United (4) |
| QLD | SEQ | 87 | Pine Hills (4) | 1–2 | Palm Beach (5) |
| QLD | SEQ | 88 | Samford Rangers (4) | 3–2 | Centenary Stormers (5) |
| QLD | SEQ | 89 | Musgrave (5) | 7–1 | Highfields (5) |
| QLD | SEQ | 90 | Slacks Creek (8) | 2–1 | Rockville Rovers (5) |
| QLD | SEQ | 91 | Mt Gravatt Hawks (5) | 3–5† | Noosa Lions (5) |
| QLD | SEQ | 92 | ACU Brisbane (8) | 0–8 | Redcliffe Dolphins (5) |
| QLD | SEQ | 93 | North Lakes United (4) | 5–3 | Ripley Valley (6) |
| QLD | SEQ | 94 | Ipswich Knights (4) | 6–3 | Pine Rivers Athletic (7) |
| QLD | SEQ | 95 | Nambour Yandina United (5) | 2–0 | Souths United (4) |
| QLD | SEQ | 96 | Brisbane Knights (5) | 4–0 | AC Carina (6) |
| QLD | SEQ | 97 | Grange Thistle (4) | 1–5 | Maroochydore (4) |
| QLD | SEQ | 98 | Ormeau (5) | 1–2 | Caloundra (5) |
| QLD | SEQ | 99 | New Farm United (6) | 2–4 | Surfers Paradise Apollo (5) |
| QLD | SEQ | 100 | Moggill (6) | 5–0 | West Wanderers (5) |
| QLD | SEQ | 101 | Holland Park Hawks (4) | 3–1 | Beerwah Glasshouse United (5) |
| QLD | SEQ | 102 | The Gap (6) | 1–0 | Woombye Snakes (5) |
| QLD | SEQ | 103 | Taringa Rovers (4) | 11–0 | Bilambil Terranora (-) |
| QLD | SEQ | 104 | North Brisbane (5) | 4–0 | Annerley (6) |

| Fed. | Zone | Tie no | Home team (Tier) | Score | Away team (Tier) |
|---|---|---|---|---|---|
| QLD | SEQ | 105 | Springfield United (5) | 6–5† | UQFC (5) |
| QLD | SEQ | 106 | Yeronga Eagles (6) | 1–2 | Robina City (5) |
| QLD | SEQ | 107 | North Pine (5) | 2–0 | Tarragindi Tigers (6) |
| QLD | SEQ | 108 | Kawana (5) | 6–0 | Canungra Owls (-) |
| QLD | SEQ | 109 | Runaway Bay (5) | 0–3 | Bayside United (4) |
| QLD | SEQ | 110 | Ridge Hills United (7) | 0–1 | Newmarket (5) |
| QLD | SEQ | 111 | Narangba Eagles (7) | 5–0 | Tweed United (5) |
| QLD | SEQ | 112 | Kangaroo Point Rovers (7) | 2–6 | Virginia United (5) |
| QLD | SEQ | 113 | Oxley United (7) | 0–4 | Jimboomba United (7) |
| QLD | SEQ | 114 | Acacia Ridge (5) | 1–4 | Western Spirit (5) |
| QLD | SEQ | 115 | Logan Village Falcons (7) | 1–4 | Bardon Latrobe (6) |
| QLD | SEQ | 116 | Coomera (5) | 0–16 | Kingscliff Wolves (5) |
| QLD | SEQ | 117 | Baringa (5) | 1–8 | North Star (4) |
South Australia
| SA | – | 118 | Mount Barker United (4) | 0–3 | The Cove (4) |
| SA | – | 119 | Adelaide Hills Hawks (4) | 0–4 | Adelaide Cobras (3) |
| SA | – | 120 | West Adelaide (3) | 3–1 | Eastern United (4) |
| SA | – | 121 | Unley United (-) | 1–2 | MA Hawks (-) |
| SA | – | 122 | Sacred Heart OC (5) | 2–3† | Elizabeth Grove (-) |
| SA | – | 123 | Para Hills East (-) | 3–2 | West Torrens Birkalla (3) |
| SA | – | 124 | Pontian Eagles (4) | 2–1 | Adelaide University (4) |
| SA | – | 125 | Cumberland United (3) | 14–0 | Ingle Farm (-) |
| SA | – | 126 | Adelaide Blue Eagles (3) | 1–0 | Playford City (3) |
| SA | – | 127 | BOSA (-) | 0–3 | Tea Tree Gully (-) |
| SA | – | 128 | Salisbury United (3) | 7–0 | Rostrevor OC (5) |
| SA | – | 129 | Ghan Kilburn City (-) | 1–4 | Adelaide Victory (3) |
| SA | – | 130 | Vipers (3) | 1–2 | Sturt Lions (3) |
| SA | – | 131 | Fulham United (3) | 15–0 | International (5) |
| SA | – | 132 | Western Strikers (3) | 6–0 | Pembroke OS (5) |
| SA | – | 133 | Modbury Vista (4) | 12–0 | Naracoorte United (5) |
| SA | – | 134 | Adelaide Titans (-) | 0–3 | Northern Demons (4) |
| SA | – | 135 | Gawler Eagles (4) | 3–0 | Noarlunga United (4) |
| SA | – | 136 | Adelaide Pumas (-) | 0–2 | Seaford Rangers (4) |
| SA | – | 137 | Elizabeth Downs (-) | 6–3 | Port Adelaide (4) |
Tasmania
| TAS | – | 138 | Burnie United (3) | 1–6 | Olympia FC Warriors (3) |
| TAS | – | 139 | Metro (3) | 2–6 | Ulverstone (3) |
| TAS | – | 140 | Taroona (3) | 3–1 | Barnstoneworth United (4) |
| TAS | – | 141 | South East United (3) | 5–3 | University of Tasmania (3) |
Victoria
| VIC | – | 142 | Strathmore (5) | 7–2 | Bell Park (8) |
| VIC | – | 143 | Eltham Redbacks (5) | 4–2† | Rowville Eagles (7) |
| VIC | – | 144 | White Star Dandenong (7) | 1–1† | Bundoora United (7) |
Bundoora United advance 5–4 on penalties
| VIC | – | 145 | West Point (8) | 0–1 | Sunbury United (7) |
| VIC | – | 146 | Point Cook (7) | 2–1 | Melton Phoenix (8) |
| VIC | – | 147 | Bendigo City (9) | 0–7 | Bayside Argonauts (6) |
| VIC | – | 148 | Mooroolbark (6) | 4–6† | Knox City (6) |
| VIC | – | 149 | Gippsland United (5) | 2–0 | Westgate Sindjelic (5) |
| VIC | – | 150 | Chelsea (8) | 5–0 | Mount Eliza (9) |
| VIC | – | 151 | Ballarat City (5) | 3–1 | Chisholm United (6) |
| VIC | – | 152 | Heatherton United (7) | 3–4 | Sydenham Park (5) |
| VIC | – | 153 | Lalor United Sloga (6) | 1–2 | Peninsula Strikers (6) |
| VIC | – | 154 | Hoppers Crossing (6) | 2–1 | Whittlesea Ranges (6) |
| VIC | – | 155 | Old Ivanhoe (9) | 1–1† | Manningham Juventus (8) |
Manningham Juventus advance 4–3 on penalties
| VIC | – | 156 | Whittlesea United (5) | 0–1 | St Kilda (7) |
| VIC | – | 157 | Darebin United (8) | 1–2 | Banyule City (5) |
| VIC | – | 158 | Ashburton United (7) | 4–3 | Laverton (7) |
| VIC | – | 159 | Mill Park (6) | 4–1 | Collingwood City (5) |
| VIC | – | 160 | South Springvale (5) | 2–2† | Western Suburbs (5) |
Western Suburbs advance 4–2 on penalties
| VIC | – | 161 | Casey Comets (5) | 3–2† | Richmond (6) |
| VIC | – | 162 | Endeavour United (8) | 3–2† | Greenvale United (8) |
| VIC | – | 163 | West Preston (8) | 0–1 | Moonee Ponds United (8) |
| VIC | – | 164 | Doreen United (9) | 1–3 | Watsonia Heights (8) |
| VIC | – | 165 | Upfield (5) | 5–4† | Malvern City (5) |
| VIC | – | 166 | Mount Waverley City (9) | 1–4 | Springvale White Eagles (5) |
| VIC | – | 167 | Dandenong South (7) | 2–2† | Old Scotch (5) |
Dandenong South advance 6–5 on penalties
| VIC | – | 168 | Sebastapol Vikings (7) | 2–1 | Geelong (5) |
| VIC | – | 169 | Bentleigh United Cobras (6) | 3–0 | Brunswick Zebras (7) |
| VIC | – | 170 | Lyndale United (8) | 0–4 | Westvale Olympic (6) |
| VIC | – | 171 | Skye United (6) | 6–1 | Fawkner (8) |
| VIC | – | 172 | Craigieburn City (6) | 1–2 | Berwick City (6) |
| VIC | – | 173 | Keilor Park (6) | 6–3 | Hampton East Brighton (6) |
| VIC | – | 174 | Brandon Park (5) | 1–2 | East Bentleigh (9) |
| VIC | – | 175 | Albion Rovers (6) | 2–2† | Westside Strikers Caroline Springs (8) |
Albion Rovers advance 5–4 on penalties
| VIC | – | 176 | Riversdale (8) | 4–2† | Corio (5) |
| VIC | – | 177 | Geelong Rangers (6) | 2–0 | East Kew (9) |
| VIC | – | 178 | Western Eagles (7) | 7–1 | Doncaster Rovers (6) |
| VIC | – | 179 | Mazenod (5) | 2–0 | Mornington (5) |
| VIC | – | 180 | Altona East Phoenix (6) | 3–0 | Yarraville Glory (5) |
| VIC | – | 181 | Brimbank Stallions (5) | 7–3 | North Caulfield Senior (6) |
| VIC | – | 182 | Plenty Valley Lions (8) | 3–3† | Waverley Wanderers (8) |
Plenty Valley Lions advance 4–2 on penalties
| VIC | – | 183 | Uni Hill Eagles (6) | 2–0 | Williamstown (7) |
| VIC | – | 184 | Clifton Hill (5) | 3–2 | Frankston Pines (7) |
Western Australia
| WA | – | 185 | Swan United (4) | 2–4 | Subiaco AFC (3) |
| WA | – | 186 | Kingsley Westside (3) | 4–3 | Gosnells City (3) |
| WA | – | 187 | Canning City (4) | 1–3 | Joondalup United (3) |
| WA | – | 188 | Cockburn City (3) | w/o | AFC Gortankaku (-) |
| WA | – | 189 | East Perth (4) | 1–1† | Rockingham City (3) |
Rockingham City advance 11–10 on penalties
| WA | – | 190 | Sorrento FC (3) | 2–0 | Balga SC (4) |
| WA | – | 191 | Mandurah City (3) | 2–0 | Curtin University (4) |
| WA | – | 192 | Gwelup Croatia (3) | 6–1 | Ballajura (6) |
| WA | – | 193 | Murdoch University Melville (3) | 12–0 | Australind (-) |
| WA | – | 194 | Carramar Shamrock Rovers (4) | 2–4 | Ashfield SC (4) |
| WA | – | 195 | Quinns FC (4) | 3–0 | Southern Spirit (6) |
| WA | – | 196 | Joondalup City (4) | 2–3 | UWA-Nedlands (3) |
| WA | – | 197 | Football Margaret River (-) | 2–4 | Kalamunda City (4) |
| WA | – | 198 | Maccabi (5) | 5–4 | Dunsborough Town (-) |
| WA | – | 199 | North Perth United (5) | 0–5 | Wanneroo City (4) |
| WA | – | 200 | Joondanna Blues (7) | 7–1 | Cracovia (6) |
| WA | – | 201 | Ellenbrook United (6) | 0–3 | Alkimos (7) |
| WA | – | 202 | Queens Park (7) | 0–7 | Forrestfield United (4) |
| WA | – | 203 | Perth AFC (7) | 2–3 | Baldivis (7) |
| WA | – | 204 | Spearwood Dalmatinac (8) | 5–6† | Wembley Downs (5) |
| WA | – | 205 | Stirling Panthers (6) | 1–5 | Dianella White Eagles (3) |

Notes

- w/o = Walkover
- † = After Extra Time
- ACT Byes: Burns (6), Canberra Juventus (3), Majura (6)
- SA Byes: Pitbulls (-).
- TAS Byes: Hobart United (3), Hobart City Beachside (3).

== Fourth round ==
| Fed. | Zone | Tie no | Home team (Tier) | Score | Away team (Tier) |
Australian Capital Territory
| ACT | – | 1 | Canberra Juventus (3) | 2–3 | Queanbeyan City (3) |
| ACT | – | 2 | O'Connor Knights (2) | 2–0 | Canberra Olympic (2) |
| ACT | – | 3 | West Canberra Wanderers (3) | 1–7 | Monaro Panthers (2) |
| ACT | – | 4 | Majura (6) | 4–4† | Burns (6) |
Majura advance 5–4 on penalties
| ACT | – | 5 | Tigers FC (2) | 2–4 | Canberra Croatia (2) |
| ACT | – | 6 | Wagga City Wanderers (3) | 1–2 | Yoogali (2) |
| ACT | – | 7 | Belconnen United (3) | 2–5 | Gungahlin United (2) |
| ACT | – | 8 | Tuggeranong United (2) | 1–0 | ANU FC (3) |
New South Wales
| NSW | – | 9 | Phoenix FC (5) | 2–0 | Glebe Gorillas (5) |
| NSW | – | 10 | Hakoah Sydney City East (3) | 6–3 | Bonnyrigg White Eagles (3) |
| NSW | – | 11 | Panorama (5) | w/o | Mounties Wanderers (3) |
| NSW | – | 12 | Berkeley Vale (5) | 4–1 | Hawkesbury City (4) |
| NSW | – | 13 | Lindfield (5) | 3–1 | Woongarrah Wildcats (5) |
| NSW | – | 14 | Rydalmere Lions (3) | 5–3 | Randwick City (5) |
| NSW | – | 15 | Sydney Olympic (2) | 11–0 | Umina United (6) |
| NSW | – | 16 | Bonnet Bay (5) | 2–3 | Shellharbour (5) |
| NSW | – | 17 | Coogee United (5) | 2–1 | Inner West Hawks (4) |
| NSW | – | 18 | APIA Leichhardt (2) | 19–1 | Hazelbrook (5) |
| NSW | – | 19 | Bankstown City (3) | 1–2 | Blacktown Spartans (3) |
| NSW | – | 20 | Waverley Old Boys (5) | 2–4 | Hills United (2) |
| NSW | – | 21 | Macarthur Rams (3) | 5–2 | Kanwal Warnervale Rovers (5) |
| NSW | – | 22 | Rockdale Ilinden (2) | 2–2† | Manly United (2) |
Rockdale Ilinden advance 4–2 on penalties
| NSW | – | 23 | Lane Cove (5) | 0–1 | Wollongong Wolves (2) |
| NSW | – | 24 | Emu Plains (5) | 2–2† | Eschol Park (5) |
Eschol Park advance 8–9 on penalties
| NSW | – | 25 | Forest Killarney (5) | 0–5 | Wollongong United (5) |
| NSW | – | 26 | St George FC (2) | 1–2 | Dunbar Rovers (3) |
| NSW | – | 27 | Mt Druitt Town Rangers (3) | 1–5 | Coniston (5) |
| NSW | – | 28 | UNSW FC (3) | 2–3 | Marconi Stallions (2) |
| NSW | – | 29 | Bulli FC (5) | 0–4 | Sydney United 58 (2) |
| NSW | – | 30 | Sutherland Sharks (2) | 9–0 | Kellyville Kolts (5) |
| NSW | – | 31 | Camden Tigers (4) | 0–3 | Fraser Park (4) |
| NSW | – | 32 | Austral SC (5) | 0–6 | Dulwich Hil (3) |
| NSW | – | 33 | Blacktown City (2) | 2–1 | St George City (2) |
| NSW | – | 34 | Northbridge (5) | 6–0 | Narellan Rangers (5) |
| NSW | – | 35 | Gladesville Ryde Magic (4) | 2–4 | Central Coast United (4) |
| NSW | – | 36 | Hurlstone Park Wanderers (5) | 2–7 | SD Raiders (3) |
| NSW | – | 37 | Yagoona Lions (5) | 0–7 | Wollongong Olympic (5) |
| NSW | – | 38 | Inter Lions (3) | 11–0 | Warilla Wanderers (6) |
| NSW | – | 39 | Cringila Lions (5) | 4–1 | Doonside Hawks (5) |
| NSW | – | 40 | Albion Park White Eagles (5) | 1–4 | NWS Spirit (2) |
Northern New South Wales
| NNSW | NTH | 41 | Alstonville (-) | 4–2 | Urunga (-) |
| NNSW | NTH | 42 | Port Saints (-) | 0–2 | Goonellabah (-) |
| NNSW | NTH | 43 | Inverell (-) | 4–1 | South Armidale United (-) |
| NNSW | NTH | 44 | Northern Storm (-) | 2–1 | Coffs Coast Tigers (-) |
| NNSW | STH | 45 | Newcastle Olympic (2) | 3–1 | New Lambton (2) |
| NNSW | STH | 46 | Lake Macquarie City (2) | 2–1 | Weston Workers (2) |
| NNSW | STH | 47 | Valentine (2) | 2–0 | Dudley Redhead Senior (4) |
| NNSW | STH | 48 | Stockton Sharks (5) | 0–8 | Edgeworth Eagles (2) |
| NNSW | STH | 49 | Warners Bay (4) | 0–2 | Cooks Hill United (2) |
| NNSW | STH | 50 | Cessnock City Hornets (3) | 0–4 | Adamstown Rosebud (2) |
| NNSW | STH | 51 | Charlestown Azzurri (2) | 7–1 | Mayfield United Senior (4) |
| NNSW | STH | 52 | South Cardiff (3) | 0–10 | Broadmeadow Magic (2) |
| NNSW | STH | 53 | West Wallsend (3) | 1–2 | Lambton Jaffas (2) |
| NNSW | STH | 54 | Maitland (2) | 8–0 | Newcastle Suns (4) |
| NNSW | STH | 55 | Kotara South (4) | 5–2 | Cardiff City (4) |
| NNSW | STH | 56 | Hamilton Azzurri (4) | 0–7 | Newcastle Croatia (5) |
Northern Territory
| NT | ASP | 57 | Verdi (2) | 4–0 | Vikings (2) |
| NT | ASP | 58 | Celtic (2) | 2–5 | Stormbirds (2) |
| NT | DAR | 59 | Darwin Olympic (2) | 7–1 | Port Darwin (2) |
| NT | DAR | 60 | Darwin Hearts (2) | 3–0 | Azzurri United (2) |
| NT | DAR | 61 | Garuda (2) | 0–7 | Mindil Aces (2) |
Queensland
| QLD | FNG | 62 | Southside Comets (5) | 4–3 | Leichhardt (5) |
| QLD | NTH | 63 | Brothers Townsville (5) | 2–1 | Burdekin (5) |
| QLD | WB v CC | 64 | Across The Waves (5) | 5–3 | Frenchville (5) |
| QLD | WC | 65 | Mackay Rangers (5) | 0–0† | Magpies FC (5) |
Magpies FC advance 10–9 on penalties
| QLD | SEQ | 66 | SWQ Thunder (3) | 0–2 | Brisbane Strikers (3) |
| QLD | SEQ | 67 | Lions FC (2) | 4–1 | Kingscliff Wolves (5) |
| QLD | SEQ | 68 | Peninsula Power (2) | w/o | Palm Beach (5) |
| QLD | SEQ | 69 | North Brisbane (5) | 2–9 | Magic United (4) |
| QLD | SEQ | 70 | Gold Coast Knights (2) | 4–0 | Jimboomba United (7) |
| QLD | SEQ | 71 | Holland Park Hawks (4) | 0–3 | Redlands United (2) |
| QLD | SEQ | 72 | Ipswich (3) | 0–7 | Sunshine Coast Wanderers (2) |
| QLD | SEQ | 73 | Surfers Paradise Apollo (5) | 2–1 | St George Willawong (3) |
| QLD | SEQ | 74 | Musgrave (5) | 2–4 | North Star (4) |
| QLD | SEQ | 75 | Caboolture Sports (3) | 3–1 | Burleigh Heads (5) |
| QLD | SEQ | 76 | Rochedale Rovers (2) | 0–4 | Brisbane City (2) |
| QLD | SEQ | 77 | The Gap (6) | 8–7† | Newmarket (5) |
| QLD | SEQ | 78 | Pacific Pines (6) | 1–8 | Bardon Latrobe (6) |
| QLD | SEQ | 79 | Taringa Rovers (4) | 5–1 | Kawana (5) |
| QLD | SEQ | 80 | Slacks Creek (8) | 2–6 | Broadbeach United (3) |
| QLD | SEQ | 81 | Brisbane Knights (5) | 2–6 | Olympic FC (2) |
| QLD | SEQ | 82 | North Pine (5) | 2–3† | North Lakes United (4) |
| QLD | SEQ | 83 | Redcliffe Dolphins (5) | 1–5 | Samford Rangers (4) |
| QLD | SEQ | 84 | Moreton City Excelsior (2) | 3–0 | Mitchelton (2) |
| QLD | SEQ | 85 | Springfield United (5) | 4–0 | Nambour Yandina United (5) |

| Fed. | Zone | Tie no | Home team (Tier) | Score | Away team (Tier) |
|---|---|---|---|---|---|
| QLD | SEQ | 86 | Logan Lightning (3) | 2–3 | Robina City (5) |
| QLD | SEQ | 87 | Capalaba (3) | 3–1 | Noosa Lions (5) |
| QLD | SEQ | 88 | Gold Coast United (2) | 2–0 | Southside Eagles (3) |
| QLD | SEQ | 89 | Eastern Suburbs (3) | 1–0 | Virginia United (5) |
| QLD | SEQ | 90 | Wynnum Wolves (2) | 3–2 | Moggill (6) |
| QLD | SEQ | 91 | Narangba Eagles (7) | 0–3 | Caloundra FC (5) |
| QLD | SEQ | 92 | Bayside United (4) | 4–1 | Ipswich Knights (4) |
| QLD | SEQ | 93 | Western Spirit (5) | 2–3 | Maroochydore (4) |
South Australia
| SA | – | 94 | Tea Tree Gully (-) | 1–4 | Adelaide Comets (2) |
| SA | – | 95 | Adelaide Croatia Raiders (2) | 2–2† | Adelaide Blue Eagles (3) |
Adelaide Blue Eagles advance 4–2 on penalties
| SA | – | 96 | Adelaide City (2) | 2–1 | South Adelaide Panthers (2) |
| SA | – | 97 | Seaford Rangers (4) | 0–4 | Modbury Jets (2) |
| SA | – | 98 | The Cove (4) | 1–0 | Pontian Eagles (4) |
| SA | – | 99 | MA Hawks (-) | 1–3 | Adelaide Olympic (2) |
| SA | – | 100 | Pitbulls (-) | 1–3 | West Adelaide (3) |
| SA | – | 101 | Elizabeth Grove (-) | 1–7 | Croydon (2) |
| SA | – | 102 | Elizabeth Downs (-) | 3–1 | Gawler Eagles (4) |
| SA | – | 103 | Salisbury United (3) | 0–6 | MetroStars (2) |
| SA | – | 104 | Sturt Lions (3) | 3–3† | Fulham United (3) |
Fulham United advance 5–3 on penalties
| SA | – | 105 | Northern Demons (4) | 3–0 | Para Hills Knights (2) |
| SA | – | 106 | Western Strikers (3) | 0–2 | Campbelltown City (2) |
| SA | – | 107 | Adelaide Cobras (3) | 1–2 | Adelaide Victory (3) |
| SA | – | 108 | Para Hills East (-) | 1–3 | Beograd (2) |
| SA | – | 109 | Cumberland United (3) | 4–0 | Modbury Vista (4) |
Tasmania
| TAS | – | 110 | Riverside Olympic (2) | 4–1 | Hobart United (3) |
| TAS | – | 111 | Launceston United (2) | 0–7 | Kingborough Lions United (2) |
| TAS | – | 112 | Somerset (3) | 1–4 | Hobart City Beachside (3) |
| TAS | – | 113 | Ulverstone SC (3) | 0–3 | Clarence Zebras (2) |
| TAS | – | 114 | New Town White Eagles (3) | 1–4 | Devonport City (2) |
| TAS | – | 115 | Launceston City (2) | 2–1 | South Hobart (2) |
| TAS | – | 116 | Glenorchy Knights (2) | 5–0 | Taroona FC (3) |
| TAS | – | 117 | South East United (3) | 10–0 | Olympia FC Warriors (3) |
Victoria
| VIC | – | 118 | Hoppers Crossing SC (6) | 3–1 | Brimbank Stallions (5) |
| VIC | – | 119 | Western Eagles (7) | 2–1 | Knox City (6) |
| VIC | – | 120 | Mill Park (6) | 0–5 | Upfield (5) |
| VIC | – | 121 | Manningham Juventus (8) | 2–6 | Banyule City (5) |
| VIC | – | 122 | Heidelberg United (2) | 8–0 | Sunbury United (7) |
| VIC | – | 123 | Clifton Hill (5) | 0–2 | Bulleen Lions (3) |
| VIC | – | 124 | Moonee Ponds United (8) | 0–3 | Manningham United Blues (2) |
| VIC | – | 125 | Green Gully (2) | 3–0 | North Geelong Warriors (3) |
| VIC | – | 126 | Springvale White Eagles (5) | 1–4 | St Kilda (7) |
| VIC | – | 127 | Altona City (4) | 7–0 | Point Cook (7) |
| VIC | – | 128 | Altona Magic (2) | 5–0 | Sebastapol Vikings (7) |
| VIC | – | 129 | Uni Hill Eagles (6) | 2–0 | Casey Comets (5) |
| VIC | – | 130 | Box Hill United (4) | 3–5 | Caroline Springs George Cross (3) |
| VIC | – | 131 | Avondale (2) | 11–1 | Endeavour United (8) |
| VIC | – | 132 | Essendon Royals (4) | 3–1 | Riversdale (8) |
| VIC | – | 133 | Skye United (6) | 1–6 | Dandenong Thunder (2) |
| VIC | – | 134 | Bayside Argonauts (6) | w/o | Watsonia Heights (8) |
| VIC | – | 135 | Port Melbourne (2) | 0–0† | Oakleigh Cannons (2) |
Oakleigh Cannons advance 8–7 on penalties
| VIC | – | 136 | Plenty Valley Lions (8) | 0–1 | Western Suburbs (5) |
| VIC | – | 137 | Strathmore (5) | 3–2 | Gippsland United (5) |
| VIC | – | 138 | Northcote City (3) | 2–1 | Keilor Park (6) |
| VIC | – | 139 | Melbourne Knights (2) | 0–2 | South Melbourne (2) |
| VIC | – | 140 | Moreland City (2) | 5–1 | Chelsea (8) |
| VIC | – | 141 | Eltham Redbacks (5) | 4–5† | Brunswick Juventus (4) |
| VIC | – | 142 | Doveton (4) | 1–3 | Langwarrin (3) |
| VIC | – | 143 | Preston Lions (3) | 2–0 | Dandenong City (2) |
| VIC | – | 144 | Goulburn Valley Suns (4) | 0–3 | Westvale Olympic (6) |
| VIC | – | 145 | Peninsula Strikers (6) | 0–1 | East Bentleigh (9) |
| VIC | – | 146 | Werribee City (3) | 1–5 | Bentleigh Greens (3) |
| VIC | – | 147 | Hume City (2) | 7–1 | Albion Rovers (6) |
| VIC | – | 148 | Eastern Lions (3) | 2–1 | Beaumaris (4) |
| VIC | – | 149 | Berwick City (6) | 4–5 | North Sunshine Eagles (4) |
| VIC | – | 150 | Melbourne Srbija (4) | 5–2 | Ashburton United (7) |
| VIC | – | 151 | Ballarat City (5) | 4–2 | Nunawading City (4) |
| VIC | – | 152 | Sydenham Park (5) | 3–1 | Pascoe Vale (4) |
| VIC | – | 153 | Bentleigh United Cobras (6) | 0–4 | Brunswick City (3) |
| VIC | – | 154 | Kingston City (3) | 2–0 | Mazenod (5) |
| VIC | – | 155 | Dandenong South (7) | 0–1 | Bundoora United (7) |
| VIC | – | 156 | Boroondara-Carey Eagles (4) | 2–6† | Altona East Phoenix (6) |
| VIC | – | 157 | Saint Albans Saints Dinamo (2) | 6–1 | Geelong Rangers (6) |
Western Australia
| WA | – | 158 | Mandurah City (3) | 3–0 | Subiaco AFC (3) |
| WA | – | 159 | Western Knights (2) | 4–2 | Floreat Athena (2) |
| WA | – | 160 | Murdoch University Melville (3) | 0–1 | Rockingham City (3) |
| WA | – | 161 | Gwelup Croatia (3) | 1–0† | Joondalup United (3) |
| WA | – | 162 | Stirling Macedonia (2) | 5–0 | Forrestfield United (4) |
| WA | – | 163 | Wanneroo City (4) | 3–1 | Kalamunda City (4) |
| WA | – | 164 | Ashfield SC (4) | 5–1 | Alkimos (7) |
| WA | – | 165 | Bayswater City (2) | 1–0 | Kingsley Westside (3) |
| WA | – | 166 | Maccabi (5) | 0–8 | Sorrento FC (3) |
| WA | – | 167 | Perth SC (2) | 5–1 | Cockburn City (3) |
| WA | – | 168 | Perth RedStar (2) | 13–0 | Baldivis (7) |
| WA | – | 169 | Fremantle City (2) | 4–1 | Quinns FC (4) |
| WA | – | 170 | Inglewood United (2) | 3–0 | UWA-Nedlands (3) |
| WA | – | 171 | Wembley Downs (5) | 2–0 | Joondanna Blues (7) |
| WA | – | 172 | Armadale SC (2) | 1–2 | Balcatta Etna (2) |
| WA | – | 173 | Dianella White Eagles (3) | 0–4 | Olympic Kingsway (2) |

Notes

- w/o = Walkover
- † = After Extra Time
- NT Byes: Casuarina (2)

== Fifth round ==
| Fed. | Zone | Tie no | Home team (Tier) | Score | Away team (Tier) |
Australian Capital Territory
| ACT | – | 1 | Monaro Panthers (2) | 3–2 | Canberra Croatia (2) |
| ACT | – | 2 | O'Connor Knights (2) | 6–0 | Queanbeyan City (3) |
| ACT | – | 3 | Tuggeranong United (2) | 2–1 | Yoogali (2) |
| ACT | – | 4 | Majura (6) | 0–7 | Gungahlin United (2) |
New South Wales
| NSW | – | 5 | Blacktown Spartans (3) | 3–1 | Dunbar Rovers (3) |
| NSW | – | 6 | Eschol Park (5) | 1–4 | Sydney United 58 (2) |
| NSW | – | 7 | Shellharbour (5) | 0–1 | Coogee United (5) |
| NSW | – | 8 | Hills United (2) | 0–3 | Wollongong Wolves (2) |
| NSW | – | 9 | APIA Leichhardt (2) | 5–0 | Berkeley Vale (5) |
| NSW | – | 10 | Macarthur Rams (3) | 3–3† | Inter Lions (3) |
Inter Lions advance 5–4 on penalties
| NSW | – | 11 | Dulwich Hill (3) | 2–3† | NWS Spirit (2) |
| NSW | – | 12 | Northbridge (5) | 2–1 | Sutherland Sharks (2) |
| NSW | – | 13 | Cringila Lions (5) | 7–1 | Rydalmere Lions (3) |
| NSW | – | 14 | Wollongong United (5) | 2–1 | Central Coast United (4) |
| NSW | – | 15 | Hakoah Sydney City East (3) | 1–2 | Rockdale Ilinden (2) |
| NSW | – | 16 | Sydney Olympic (2) | 4–1 | Wollongong Olympic (5) |
| NSW | – | 17 | Blacktown City (2) | 3–0 | Fraser Park (4) |
| NSW | – | 18 | SD Raiders (3) | 2–4 | Marconi Stallions (2) |
| NSW | – | 19 | Phoenix FC (5) | 3–3† | Lindfield (5) |
Phoenix FC advance 12–11 on penalties
| NSW | – | 20 | Panorama (5) | 1–3 | Coniston (5) |
Northern New South Wales
| NNSW | NTH | 21 | Alstonville (-) | 3–2 | Northern Storm (-) |
| NNSW | NTH | 22 | Inverell FC (-) | 5–0 | Goonellabah (-) |
| NNSW | STH | 23 | Newcastle Croatia (5) | 3–1 | Kotara South (4) |
| NNSW | STH | 24 | Cooks Hill United (2) | 0–1 | Newcastle Olympic (2) |
| NNSW | STH | 25 | Broadmeadow Magic (2) | 6–1 | Lake Macquarie City (2) |
| NNSW | STH | 26 | Adamstown Rosebud (2) | 0–2 | Lambton Jaffas (2) |
| NNSW | STH | 27 | Maitland (2) | 0–2 | Charlestown Azzurri (2) |
| NNSW | STH | 28 | Edgeworth Eagles (2) | 4–3 | Valentine (2) |
Northern Territory
| NT | DAR | 29 | Casuarina (2) | 1–1† | Mindil Aces (2) |
Casuarina advance 5–4 on penalties
| NT | DAR | 30 | Darwin Hearts (2) | 2–0 | Hellenic Athletic (2) |
| NT | ASP | 31 | Stormbirds (2) | 1–4 | Verdi (2) |
Queensland
| QLD | NTH v FNG | 32 | Brothers Townsville (5) | 2–2† | Southside Comets (5) |
Southside Comets advance 3–2 on penalties
| QLD | REG | 33 | Magpies FC (5) | 4–2 | Across The Waves (5) |
| QLD | SEQ | 34 | Redlands United (2) | 4–5 | Brisbane City (2) |
| QLD | SEQ | 35 | The Gap (6) | 1–3 | Maroochydore Swans (4) |
| QLD | SEQ | 36 | Lions FC (2) | 2–0 | Peninsula Power (2) |
| QLD | SEQ | 37 | North Star (4) | 2–2† | Taringa Rovers (4) |
North Star advance 4–2 on penalties
| QLD | SEQ | 38 | Wynnum Wolves (2) | 2–3 | Magic United (4) |
| QLD | SEQ | 39 | Moreton City Excelsior (2) | 12–1 | Springfield United (5) |
| QLD | SEQ | 40 | Eastern Suburbs (3) | 3–1 | Broadbeach United (3) |
| QLD | SEQ | 41 | North Lakes United (4) | 3–1 | Bardon Latrobe (6) |
| QLD | SEQ | 42 | Caboolture Sports (3) | 3–3† | Brisbane Strikers (3) |
Caboolture Sports advance 4–3 on penalties
| QLD | SEQ | 43 | Olympic FC (2) | 4–1 | Robina City (5) |

| Fed. | Zone | Tie no | Home team (Tier) | Score | Away team (Tier) |
|---|---|---|---|---|---|
| QLD | SEQ | 44 | Gold Coast United (2) | 5–0 | Caloundra FC (5) |
| QLD | SEQ | 45 | Surfers Paradise Apollo (5) | 3–2 | Samford Rangers (4) |
| QLD | SEQ | 46 | Gold Coast Knights (2) | 1–1† | Sunshine Coast Wanderers (2) |
Sunshine Coast advance 4–2 on penalties
| QLD | SEQ | 47 | Bayside United (4) | 0–3 | Capalaba FC (3) |
South Australia
| SA | – | 48 | Modbury Jets (2) | 2–1 | Adelaide Victory (3) |
| SA | – | 49 | Campbelltown City (2) | 3–1 | Adelaide Blue Eagles (3) |
| SA | – | 50 | West Adelaide (3) | 1–3 | Adelaide Comets (2) |
| SA | – | 51 | Northern Demons (4) | 3–0 | Elizabeth Downs (-) |
| SA | – | 52 | Fulham United (3) | 1–4 | Beograd (2) |
| SA | – | 53 | Cumberland United (3) | 3–1 | The Cove (4) |
| SA | – | 54 | MetroStars (2) | 1–2 | Croydon (2) |
| SA | – | 55 | Adelaide City (2) | 0–2 | Adelaide Olympic (2) |
Tasmania
| TAS | – | 56 | Hobart City (3) | 0–4 | Devonport City (2) |
| TAS | – | 57 | Clarence Zebras (2) | 2–5 | Riverside Olympic (2) |
| TAS | – | 58 | Glenorchy Knights (2) | 7–0 | South East United (3) |
| TAS | – | 59 | Kingborough Lions United (2) | 2–1 | Launceston City (2) |
Victoria
| VIC | – | 60 | Moreland City (2) | 2–2† | Dandenong Thunder (2) |
Moreland City advance 4–3 on penalties
| VIC | – | 61 | North Sunshine Eagles (4) | 2–1 | Western Suburbs (5) |
| VIC | – | 62 | Bentleigh Greens (3) | 4–0 | Upfield (5) |
| VIC | – | 63 | Preston Lions (3) | 2–0† | Sydenham Park (5) |
| VIC | – | 64 | St. Albans Saints (2) | 3–1 | East Bentleigh (9) |
| VIC | – | 65 | Green Gully (2) | 4–0 | Ballarat City (5) |
| VIC | – | 66 | Altona East Phoenix (6) | 0–1† | Avondale (2) |
| VIC | – | 67 | Heidelberg United (2) | 4–2 | Brunswick Juventus (4) |
| VIC | – | 68 | Western Eagles (7) | 2–2† | Hoppers Crossing (6) |
Hoppers Crossing advance 3–1 on penalties
| VIC | – | 69 | Altona City (4) | 3–1 | Manningham United Blues (2) |
| VIC | – | 70 | Caroline Springs George Cross (3) | 4–0 | Banyule City (5) |
| VIC | – | 71 | Kingston City (3) | 2–1 | St Kilda (7) |
| VIC | – | 72 | South Melbourne (2) | 4–3 | Eastern Lions (3) |
| VIC | – | 73 | Uni Hill Eagles (6) | 0–2 | Melbourne Srbija (4) |
| VIC | – | 74 | Essendon Royals (4) | 4–3† | Bulleen Lions (3) |
| VIC | – | 75 | Strathmore (5) | 1–3 | Langwarrin (3) |
| VIC | – | 76 | Bundoora United (7) | 0–1 | Bayside Argonauts (6) |
| VIC | – | 77 | Altona Magic (2) | 4–3 | Northcote City (3) |
| VIC | – | 78 | Hume City (2) | 4–1 | Brunswick City (3) |
| VIC | – | 79 | Westvale Olympic (6) | 1–5 | Oakleigh Cannons (2) |
Western Australia
| WA | – | 80 | Fremantle City (2) | 1–4 | Sorrento FC (3) |
| WA | – | 81 | Gwelup Croatia (3) | 0–3 | Perth RedStar (2) |
| WA | – | 82 | Mandurah City (3) | 1–5 | Olympic Kingsway (2) |
| WA | – | 83 | Wanneroo City (4) | 2–7 | Perth SC (2) |
| WA | – | 84 | Rockingham City (3) | 3–0 | Wembley Downs (5) |
| WA | – | 85 | Stirling Macedonia (2) | 1–0 | Balcatta Etna (2) |
| WA | – | 86 | Bayswater City (2) | 1–2 | Western Knights (2) |
| WA | – | 87 | Ashfield SC (4) | 1–1† | Inglewood United (2) |
Ashfield advance 6–5 on penalties

Notes

- † = After Extra Time
- NT Byes: Darwin Olympic (2)

== Sixth round ==
| Fed. | Zone | Tie no | Home team (Tier) | Score | Away team (Tier) |
Australian Capital Territory
| ACT | – | 1 | Gungahlin United (2) | 1–3 | O'Connor Knights (2) |
| ACT | – | 2 | Tuggeranong United (2) | 0–4 | Monaro Panthers (2) |
New South Wales
| NSW | – | 3 | Wollongong Wolves (2) | 0–2 | Rockdale Ilinden (2) |
| NSW | – | 4 | Coogee United (5) | 0–1 | Marconi Stallions (2) |
| NSW | – | 5 | Cringila Lions (5) | 0–3 | Phoenix FC (5) |
| NSW | – | 6 | Coniston (5) | 3–5 | Inter Lions (3) |
| NSW | – | 7 | Northbridge (5) | 0–4 | Blacktown City (2) |
| NSW | – | 8 | Sydney Olympic (2) | 1–3† | NWS Spirit (2) |
| NSW | – | 9 | APIA Leichhardt (2) | 5–2 | Blacktown Spartans (3) |
| NSW | – | 10 | Wollongong United (5) | 2–4 | Sydney United 58 (2) |
Northern New South Wales
| NNSW | – | 11 | Broadmeadow Magic (2) | 9–0 | Alstonville (-) |
| NNSW | – | 12 | Inverell FC (-) | 0–7 | Edgeworth FC (2) |
| NNSW | – | 13 | Lambton Jaffas (2) | 5–1 | Newcastle Croatia (5) |
| NNSW | – | 14 | Newcastle Olympic (2) | 2–0 | Charlestown Azzurri (2) |
Northern Territory
| NT | ASP v DAR | 15 | Verdi (2) | 2–4 | Darwin Hearts (2) |
| NT | DAR | 16 | Darwin Olympic (2) | 1–0 | Casuarina (2) |
Queensland
| QLD | REG | 17 | Magpies FC (5) | 1–4 | Southside Comets (5) |
| QLD | SEQ | 18 | Magic United (4) | 2–3† | Surfers Paradise Apollo (5) |
| QLD | SEQ | 19 | Gold Coast United (2) | 4–0 | Caboolture Sports (3) |
| QLD | SEQ | 20 | Maroochydore Swans (4) | 3–5 | Lions FC (2) |
| QLD | SEQ | 21 | Sunshine Coast Wanderers (2) | 0–1 | Brisbane City (2) |
| QLD | SEQ | 22 | Olympic FC (2) | 8–0 | North Lakes United (4) |

| Fed. | Zone | Tie no | Home team (Tier) | Score | Away team (Tier) |
|---|---|---|---|---|---|
| QLD | SEQ | 23 | Moreton City Excelsior (2) | 3–1 | North Star (4) |
| QLD | SEQ | 24 | Eastern Suburbs (3) | 7–1 | Capalaba FC (3) |
South Australia
| SA | – | 25 | Adelaide Comets (2) | 3–0 | Beograd (2) |
| SA | – | 26 | Northern Demons (4) | 0–4 | Adelaide Olympic (2) |
| SA | – | 27 | Campbelltown City (2) | 2–1 | Cumberland United (3) |
| SA | – | 28 | Modbury Jets (2) | 4–0 | Croydon (2) |
Tasmania
| TAS | – | 29 | Riverside Olympic (2) | 1–2 | Kingborough Lions United (2) |
| TAS | – | 30 | Devonport City (2) | 2–3† | Glenorchy Knights (2) |
Victoria
| VIC | – | 31 | Kingston City (3) | 2–0 | Langwarrin (3) |
| VIC | – | 32 | St. Albans Saints (2) | 1–0 | Green Gully (2) |
| VIC | – | 33 | Caroline Springs George Cross (3) | 2–1† | Altona City (4) |
| VIC | – | 34 | North Sunshine Eagles (4) | 2–5 | Avondale (2) |
| VIC | – | 35 | Altona Magic (2) | 0–4 | Heidelberg United (2) |
| VIC | – | 36 | Hume City (2) | 4–2 | Bayside Argonauts (6) |
| VIC | – | 37 | Hoppers Crossing (6) | 0–5 | Melbourne Srbija (4) |
| VIC | – | 38 | Preston Lions (3) | 2–5 | South Melbourne (2) |
| VIC | – | 39 | Moreland City (2) | 0–3 | Oakleigh Cannons (2) |
| VIC | – | 40 | Essendon Royals (4) | 1–3 | Bentleigh Greens (3) |
Western Australia
| WA | – | 41 | Olympic Kingsway (2) | 3–2 | Western Knights (2) |
| WA | – | 42 | Perth SC (2) | 3–2 | Stirling Macedonia (2) |
| WA | – | 43 | Ashfield SC (4) | 0–4 | Sorrento FC (3) |
| WA | – | 44 | Perth RedStar (2) | 2–0 | Rockingham City FC (3) |

Notes

- † = After Extra Time

== Seventh round ==
| Fed. | Zone | Tie no | Home team (Tier) | Score | Away team (Tier) |
Australian Capital Territory
| ACT | – | 1 | O'Connor Knights (2) | 4–2 | Monaro Panthers (2) |
New South Wales
| NSW | – | 2 | Rockdale Ilinden (2) | 9–1 | Phoenix FC (5) |
| NSW | – | 3 | APIA Leichhardt (2) | 2–1† | Marconi Stallions (2) |
| NSW | – | 4 | Inter Lions (3) | 1–5 | Blacktown City (2) |
| NSW | – | 5 | NWS Spirit (2) | 2–1 | Sydney United 58 (2) |
Northern New South Wales
| NNSW | – | 6 | Broadmeadow Magic (2) | 1–2 | Lambton Jaffas (2) |
| NNSW | – | 7 | Newcastle Olympic (2) | 0–1 | Edgeworth FC (2) |
Northern Territory
| NT | – | 8 | Darwin Olympic (2) | 1–3 | Darwin Hearts (2) |
Queensland
| QLD | – | 9 | Moreton City Excelsior (2) | 2–0 | Gold Coast United (2) |
| QLD | – | 10 | Lions FC (2) | 2–0 | Surfers Paradise Apollo (5) |
| QLD | – | 11 | Southside Comets (5) | 0–6 | Olympic FC (2) |

| Fed. | Zone | Tie no | Home team (Tier) | Score | Away team (Tier) |
|---|---|---|---|---|---|
| QLD | – | 12 | Brisbane City (2) | 3–2 | Eastern Suburbs (3) |
South Australia
| SA | – | 13 | Modbury Jets (2) | 1–0 | Adelaide Olympic (2) |
| SA | – | 14 | Campbelltown City (2) | 2–0 | Adelaide Comets (2) |
Tasmania
| TAS | – | 15 | Kingborough Lions United (2) | 2–3† | Glenorchy Knights (2) |
Victoria
| VIC | – | 16 | South Melbourne (2) | 1–0 | St. Albans Saints (2) |
| VIC | – | 17 | Oakleigh Cannons (2) | 3–1 | Avondale (2) |
| VIC | – | 18 | Bentleigh Greens (3) | 0–6 | Heidelberg United (2) |
| VIC | – | 19 | Kingston City (3) | 0–2 | Melbourne Srbija (4) |
| VIC | – | 20 | Hume City (2) | 4–0 | Caroline Springs George Cross (3) |
Western Australia
| WA | – | 21 | Olympic Kingsway (2) | 2–1 | Perth (2) |
| WA | – | 22 | Sorrento (3) | 1–2† | Perth RedStar (2) |

Notes

- † = After Extra Time

== A-League Men play-offs ==
23 July 2024
19:00 ACST

| Brisbane Roar | 2–4 | Perth Glory |
|---|---|---|
| Jelacic 17'; Zimarino 90+3' | Report | Williams 38'; Faisal 52' (pen.), 58'; Blair 65' |

Larrakia Park, Darwin
Attendance: 1,254
Referee: Ben Abraham
24 July 2024
17:30 ACST

| Newcastle Jets | 4–1 | Western United |
|---|---|---|
| Garuccio 17' (o.g.); Aquilina 29', 66'; Grimaldi 42' | Report | Danzaki 89' |

Larrakia Park, Darwin
Attendance: 1,238
Referee: Tim Danaskos
