= List of Croatian soccer clubs in Australia =

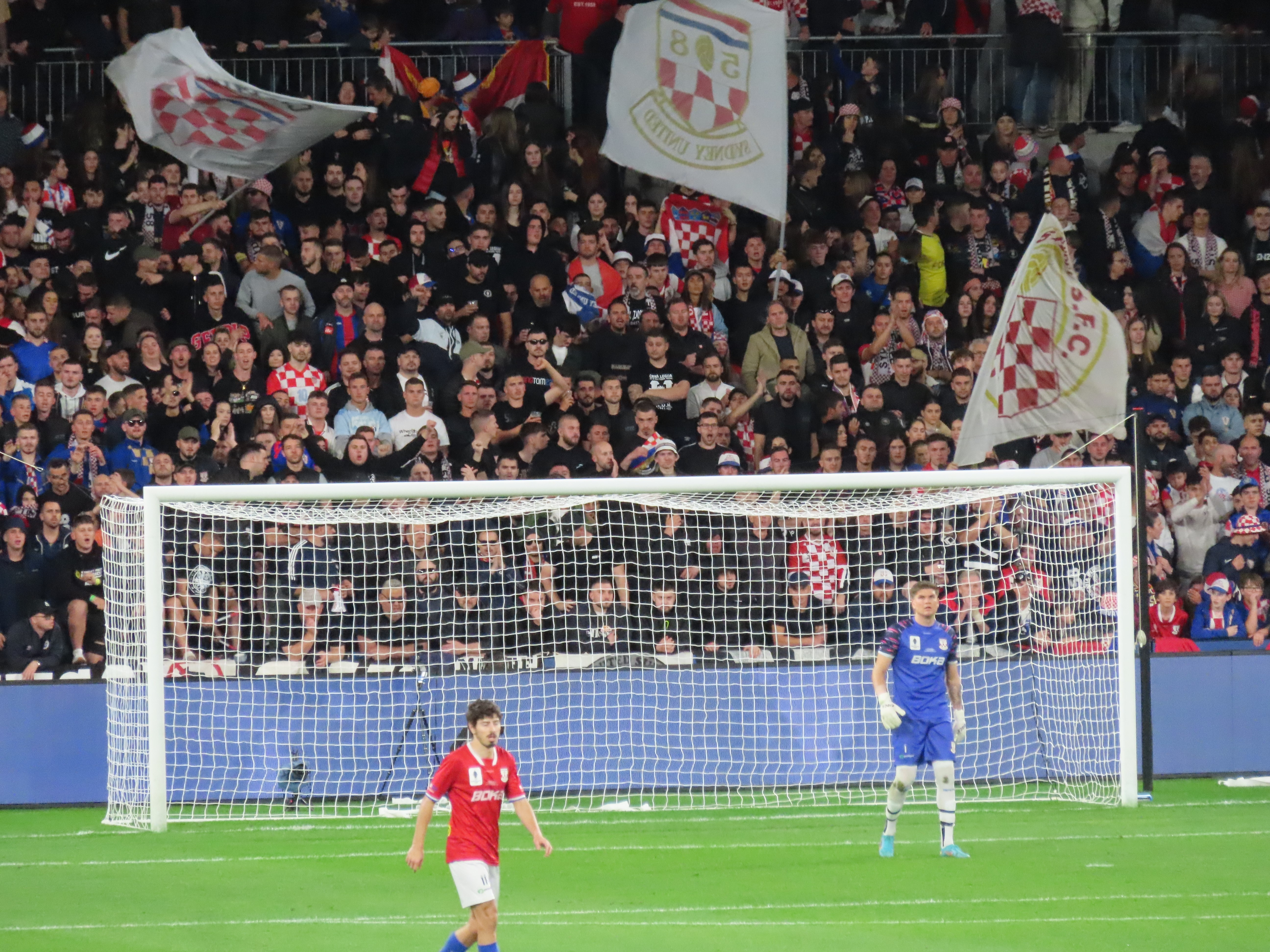
Fans of Sydney United 58 FC, a soccer club founded by Croatian Australians, at the 2022 Australia Cup Final

The Croatian community of Australia has played an important part in the history of Australian soccer. Countless clubs have been formed over the years in every state and territory, except for the Northern Territory. At present there are 31 active Croatian soccer clubs operating in Australia.

The first Croatian soccer/sporting club founded in Australia was HSNK Zora (no longer in existence), which was founded in 1931, Sydney. Currently the oldest surviving Croatian club in Australia is the Adelaide Raiders, founded in 1952 as Adelaide Croatia. The most successful and largest Croatian clubs in Australia are the Melbourne Knights and Sydney United, both clubs played in the National Soccer League for 21 seasons.

The Croatian community holds the Australian-Croatian Soccer Tournament which has been held annually since 1974. It is the largest 'ethnic' based soccer cup competition in Australia as well as the oldest national soccer competition in Australia, with clubs from all over the country and even New Zealand competing.

== Active Clubs by state ==
Note: clubs in National Premier Leagues in bold text

Australian Capital Territory

- **Canberra Croatia FC**
- **HNK O'Connor Knights**

New South Wales

- **Sydney United 58**
- South Coast United
- Hurstville Zagreb
- Newcastle Croatia
- Werrington Croatia FC
- HNK Edensor Park
- NK Kralj Tomislav
- HNK Dalmacija Sydney

Queensland

- **Gold Coast Knights**
- Brisbane Knights FC
- Sunnyside Croatia
- NK Adriatic Gold Coast
- Stratford Dolphins FC

South Australia

- **Adelaide Croatia Raiders**
- Whyalla Croatia
- Adelaide Croatia Vukovi

Tasmania

- **Glenorchy Knights**

Victoria

- **Melbourne Knights**
- **St Albans Dinamo**
- North Geelong Warriors
- **Dandenong City Hajduk**
- FC Strathmore Split
- St Albans Vukovar
- St Albans Gospić Bears
- NK Bunker
- Elcho Park Cardinals
- Wednesday Knights FC
- Irymple Knights

Western Australia

- **Western Knights**
- Gwelup Croatia

== See also ==
- List of sports clubs inspired by others
- List of Greek soccer clubs in Australia
- List of Italian soccer clubs in Australia
- List of Serbian soccer clubs in Australia
