= South Coast United =

South Coast United may refer to:

- Safeway United, established in 1958 and dissolved in 1974, a New South Wales Federation of Soccer clubs First Division team known as South Coast United from 1961 to 1972.
- South Coast United SC, established in 1984, currently competing in the Illawarra Premier League.
