= Takeru Okada =

Japanese footballer (born 1994)

Personal information
- Full name: Takeru Okada
- Date of birth: August 31, 1994 (age 32)
- Place of birth: Ehime, Japan
- Height: 1.67 m (5 ft 5 1/2 in)
- Position: Midfielder

Team information
- Current team: Olympic FC
- Number: 10

Youth career
- 2010–2012: Cerezo Osaka

Senior career*
Years	Team	Apps	(Gls)
2013–2015	Cerezo Osaka	0	(0)
2013	→ AC Nagano Parceiro (loan)	14	(1)
2016	FC Tiamo Hirakata	8	(2)
2016–2017	GKS Bełchatów	2	(0)
2017	FC Tiamo Hirakata		
2018	Corrimal Rangers	22	(6)
2019–2020	Wollongong Wolves	37	(10)
2021	Heidelberg United	16	(2)
2022	Olympic FC	21	(5)
2024–	Brisbane Knights FC	18	(12)
- * Club domestic league appearances and goals as of 21 September 2022

Takeru Okada (岡田 武瑠, Okada Takeru; born August 31, 1994) is a Japanese football player. He plays for Brisbane Knights FC in FQPL 3.

== Career ==
Takeru Okada joined J1 League club Cerezo Osaka in 2013. In May, he moved to Japan Football League club AC Nagano Parceiro on loan. In 2016, he moved to Regional Leagues club FC Tiamo Hirakata. In September, he moved to Polish II liga club GKS Bełchatów. In March 2017, he returned to FC Tiamo Hirakata. He then moved to Australia to play for Olympic FC in Brisbane, before moving to FQPL 3 side Brisbane Knights FC
