= Stuart Webster =

Scottish-Australian footballer

Personal information
- Date of birth: 25 October 1978 (age 48)
- Place of birth: Ayr, Scotland
- Position: Goalkeeper

Team information
- Current team: Doveton S.C
- Number: 1

Youth career
- –2001: Frankston Pines

Senior career*
Years	Team	Apps	(Gls)
2000–2001	Greenock Morton	7	(0)
2003–2005	Frankston Pines	46	(0)
2005–2007	Oakleigh Cannons	62	(0)
2007–2009	Richmond SC	42	(0)
2007	→ Wellington Phoenix (loan)	0	(0)
2009–2013	Dandenong Thunder	60	(0)
2013	Doveton SC	2	(0)
2013–2014	Bentleigh Greens	20	(0)
2014–2015	St Albans Saints	4	(0)
2016–	Doveton S.C	120	(0)
- * Club domestic league appearances and goals

Stuart Webster (born 25 October 1978) is a Scottish-Australian footballer who plays for Doveton SC as a goalkeeper.

== Career ==
Stuart Webster started his playing career as a left winger, eventually moving into goals when he was 15 years old. Stuart joined the Frankston Pines Soccer Club in 1994 at the age of 16, becoming their player of the year in 1997. With the Pines, Webster achieved promotion from State League 3 in 1998 and State 2 in 1999, once more winning their player of the year award in 1999.

A move overseas in 2000 saw Webster turn out for Tarff Rovers FC and Greenock Morton F.C. between 2000 and 2001. Webster left Morton in 2001 as the club went into administration. He then return to the Pines. With the Pines, Webster won the State League 1 in 2002, picking up their Player of the Year award for the third time. In 2003, Frankston finished runners-up in the Victorian Premier League and Webster collected his fourth Player of the Year award from the club, also being selected as the Victorian Premier League Goalkeeper of the Year in 2003.

Webster left the Pines in 2005 to sign for Oakleigh Cannons. He signed for Richmond SC for the 2007 VPL season.

In November 2007, Webster joined New Zealand's A League team Wellington Phoenix on a one-match deal for the match against Sydney FC. He came into the squad in the absence of Mark Paston and Jacob Spoonley who were away with the All Whites.

In January 2009, he joined Dandenong Thunder from Richmond SC. That season, they remained unbeaten for 10 rounds.

In 2014 Webster moved to St Albans Saints and kept in their first FFA Cup tie against Parramatta FC. He left St Albans at the end of the 2015 NPL1 season and signed for State League 2 North-West side Geelong SC, managed by close friends Steve Laurie and Toby Paterson.
