= Cho Byung-kuk =

South Korean footballer (born 1981)

Cho Byung-kuk 조병국
Personal information
- Full name: Cho Byung-kuk
- Date of birth: July 1, 1981 (age 45)
- Place of birth: Ulsan, South Korea
- Height: 1.83 m (6 ft 0 in)
- Position: Centre back

Team information
- Current team: Persija (assistant)

Youth career
- 2000–2001: Yonsei University

Senior career*
Years	Team	Apps	(Gls)
2002–2004	Suwon Samsung Bluewings	61	(3)
2005	Jeonnam Dragons	0	(0)
2005–2010	Seongnam Ilhwa Chunma	128	(2)
2011	Vegalta Sendai	28	(0)
2012–2013	Júbilo Iwata	44	(7)
2014	Shanghai Shenhua	28	(0)
2015	Chonburi	23	(3)
2016	Incheon United	29	(1)
2017–2018	Gyeongnam FC	8	(1)
2018	Suwon FC	13	(0)
2019	South Coast United	21	(2)
Total		383	(18)

International career^{‡}
1999–2000	South Korea U-23	7	(2)
2002–2004	South Korea U-23	32	(0)
2003–2011	South Korea	11	(1)

Managerial career
- 2019–2022: South Coast United (assistant)
- 2022–2025: Indonesia (assistant)
- 2022–2025: Indonesia U23 (assistant)
- 2022–2023: Indonesia U20 (assistant)
- 2025–2026: Jeju SK (assistant)
- 2026–: Persija (assistant)
Medal record
Representing South Korea
Men's football
Asian Games
Bronze medal – third place	2002 Busan	Team
- * Club domestic league appearances and goals as of 1 November 2017 ‡ National team caps and goals as of Jan 10, 2014

- Cho Byung-kuk
- Hangul: 조병국
- Hanja: 曺秉局
- RR: Jo Byeongguk
- MR: Cho Pyŏngguk

Cho Byung-kuk (Korean: 조병국; born July 1, 1981) is a South Korean international football manager and former football player. He is currently an assistant coach for Persija.

== Playing career ==
Cho began his professional career in 2002 with K-League club Suwon Samsung Bluewings. He moved to Chunnam Dragons at the end of the 2004 season in a swap deal which saw Kim Nam-Il move to Suwon. In August 2005, he joined Seongnam Ilhwa Chunma.

He was part of the South Korea football team in 2004 Summer Olympics, who finished second in Group A, making it through to the next round, before being defeated by silver medal winners Paraguay.

In May 2010, he left team to do military service.

On 10 January 2014, Cho transferred to Chinese Super League side Shanghai Greenland Shenhua and becomes the first ever South Korean player in history of the Chinese club.

== Club statistics ==
=== Club ===
Appearances and goals by club, season and competition
Club	Season	League			Cup		League Cup		Continental		Other		Total	
Club	Season	Division	Apps	Goals	Apps	Goals	Apps	Goals	Apps	Goals	Apps	Goals	Apps	Goals
Suwon Samsung Bluewings	2002	K League 1	18	2	4	0	5	1	2	0	1	0	30	3
Suwon Samsung Bluewings	2003	K League 1	29	0	0	0	—		—		—		29	0
Suwon Samsung Bluewings	2004	K League 1	14	1	0	0	0	0	—		—		14	1
Suwon Samsung Bluewings	Total		61	3	4	0	5	1	2	0	1	0	73	4
Jeonnam Dragons	2005	K League 1	0	0	0	0	0	0	—		—		0	0
Seongnam Ilhwa Chunma	2005	K League 1	12	0	1	0	0	0	—		—		13	0
Seongnam Ilhwa Chunma	2006	K League 1	28	0	1	0	12	0	—		—		41	0
Seongnam Ilhwa Chunma	2007	K League 1	25	0	0	0	1	1	9	2	—		35	3
Seongnam Ilhwa Chunma	2008	K League 1	18	0	1	0	7	0	—		—		26	0
Seongnam Ilhwa Chunma	2009	K League 1	19	2	3	0	7	0	—		—		29	2
Seongnam Ilhwa Chunma	2010	K League 1	26	0	2	0	4	0	11	1	2	0	45	1
Seongnam Ilhwa Chunma	Total		128	2	8	0	31	2	20	3	2	0	189	7
Vegalta Sendai	2011	J1 League	28	0	1	0	4	0	—		—		33	0
Júbilo Iwata	2012	J1 League	23	6	0	0	0	0	—		—		23	6
Júbilo Iwata	2013	J1 League	21	1	0	0	3	0	—		—		24	1
Júbilo Iwata	Total		44	7	0	0	3	0	—		—		47	7
Shanghai Shenhua	2014	Chinese Super League	28	0	2	0	—		—		—		30	0
Chonburi	2015	Thai League 1	23	3	0	0	0	0	1	0	—		24	3
Incheon United	2016	K League 1	29	1	0	0	—		—		—		29	1
Gyeongnam FC	2017	K League 2	8	1	0	0	—		—		—		8	1
Gyeongnam FC	2018	K League 1	0	0	—		—		—		—		0	0
Gyeongnam FC	Total		8	1	0	0	—		—		—		8	1
Suwon FC	2018	K League 2	13	0	0	0	—		—		—		13	0
Career total			362	16	15	0	43	2	23	3	3	0	444	21

=== International ===
Appearances and goals by national team and year
National team	Year	Apps	Goals
South Korea	2002	0	0
South Korea	2003	5	0
South Korea	2004	6	1
South Korea	2008	0	0
South Korea	2011	0	0
South Korea	2012	0	0
Total		11	1

Results list South Korea's goal tally first.

Goal	Date	Venue	Opponent	Score	Result	Competition
1.	18 February 2004	Suwon World Cup Stadium, Suwon, South Korea	Lebanon	2–0	2–0	2006 FIFA World Cup qualification

== See also ==
- South Korea national football team
