= Tomislav Milardovic =

Australian soccer player

Tomi Milardovic
Personal information
- Full name: Tomislav Milardovic
- Date of birth: 6 August 1982 (age 44)
- Place of birth: Melbourne, Australia
- Height: 1.83 m (6 ft 0 in)
- Positions: Central midfielder; centre back

Senior career*
Years	Team	Apps	(Gls)
2002–2004	St Albans Saints	107	(8)
2005–2008	Melbourne Knights	72	(9)
2007	→ Adelaide United (loan)	5	(0)
2009–2010	Richmond SC	37	(3)
2011	St Albans Saints	20	(0)
2012–2013	Richmond SC	17	(0)
2013–2017	Pascoe Vale	103	(4)
- * Club domestic league appearances and goals as of 29 September 2017

Tomi Milardovic (born 6 August 1982 in Melbourne, Victoria) is an Australian footballer who plays for Pascoe Vale. He was signed by Adelaide United in 2007 on a short-term contract as injury cover for Angelo Costanzo.

== Honours ==
NPL Victoria Team of The Week Round 2 2017
