= Newcastle Croatia FC =

Australian football club

Newcastle Croatia
- Full name: Newcastle Croatia Football Club
- Nicknames: Croatia, Wickham Croatia
- Founded: 1984 (defunct 1994); 2021
- Ground: Lake Macquarie Regional Football Facility; Speers Point, New South Wales; Croatian Sports Club/Wickham Park; Wickham, Newcastle
- Capacity: 1,000
- League: Northern League One
- 2026: 3rd of 10
- Website: www.facebook.com/NewcastleCroatiaFC
Home colours	Away colours

The Newcastle Croatia Football Club is a semi-professional football club based in the region of Newcastle, New South Wales. Newcastle Croatia FC currently compete in the Hit106.9 Northern League One which is the second tier of competition in Northern NSW.

The club was formed by the city's Croatian Australian community as Newcastle Croatia in 1984 and debuted that year in the 5th Division of the Newcastle League. The club was based in Wickham, New South Wales and would in following years change its name to Wickham Croatia. The club eventually disbanded in 1994.

In 2021, under the umbrella of the Croatian Wickham Sports Club, the club was re-established and set to play its first season since re-establishment in 2022 in the Northern NSW Zone Football League Three (5th division of Northern NSW).

== History ==
=== First Iteration (1984-1994) ===
1984-1994 Newcastle Croatia logo

• 1986, Minor Premiers of the 5th Division and were promoted to 4th Division

• 1987, Grand Finalists and Minor Premiers of 4th Division

• 1988, Grand Final Runners-Up and Minor Premiers of 3rd Division. Promoted to 2nd Division

It was a remarkably quick rise from the club, by 1991 the club had made it all the way to the premier competition, the NBN State Football League, only 7 years after its formation. The club immediately cemented itself as one of the top sides in the league, finishing an impressive 4th in its debut season.

The club had a few stellar seasons in the NBN State Football League where it came 3rd in seasons 1992 and 1993. In 1992 the club had a great run in the finals, with the club making the Grand Final against West Wallsend FC. Unfortunately Newcastle Croatia went down 2–1 at Austral Park in front of a crowd of 2,500 spectators. The club would again make the Grand Final in 1994, losing 2–1 to Highfields Azzurri.

However the club was disbanded following the 1994 season when it couldn't field a team in the NBN State Football League. The club had also been a regular participant in the Australian-Croatian Soccer Tournament.

The 1992 Newcastle Croatia Grand Final squad:

- David Connor
- Grant Brinkworth
- John Tonkin
- Craig A. Jones
- Michael Boogaard
- Reg Chilby (captain)
- John Govan
- Steve Bajzath
- Karl Freeman
- Steve Brown
- Lorenzo Saetta

Substitutes:

- Craig L. Jones
- Doug Elphick
- Chris Breasley
- Jason Coombes
- Michael Kmet

Richard Hartley (coach)

=== Second Iteration (2021-present) ===
In 2021, under the umbrella of the Croatian Wickham Sports Club, the club was re-established and is set to play its first season since re-establishment in 2022 in the Northern NSW Zone Football League Three.

• 2023, Promoted to Zone League Two

• 2024, Promoted to Zone league One

• 2025, Promoted to Hit106.9 Northern League One

By 2026, only 4 years after re-establishment, the club had earned promotion to the Northern League One, the second tier of soccer in northern New South Wales.

=== Home Ground ===
All Newcastle Croatia FC home games will be played out of Lake Macquarie Regional Football Facility, Speers Point.

== Honours ==
- Zone League One Premiership:
  - Winners (1): 2025
- Zone League One Championship:
  - Winners (1): 2025
- NNSW Community Plate:
  - Winners (1): 2024
- Zone League Two Premiership:
  - Winners (1): 2024
- Zone League Three Championship:
  - Winners (1): 2023
- NBN State league/NPL Northern NSW Championship:
  - Runners-up (2): 1992, 1994
- Northern Division Two/Northern League One Premiership:
  - Winners (1): 1990
- Northern Division Two/Northern League One Championship:
  - Runners-up (1): 1990
- Northern Division Three Premiership:
  - Winners (1): 1988
- Northern Division Three Championship:
  - Runners-up (1): 1988
- Northern Division Four Premiership:
  - Winners (1): 1987
- Northern Division Four Championship:
  - Winners (1): 1987
- Northern Division Five Premiership:
  - Winners (1): 1986
- Northern Division Five Championship:
  - Winners (1): 1986

== See also ==
- List of Croatian football clubs in Australia
- Australian-Croatian Soccer Tournament
