= Irymple Knights =

Australian soccer club

Irymple Knights emblem.

Irymple Knights Soccer Club is an Australian soccer club from Mildura, Victoria. The club was founded by Mildura's Croatian Australian community as Zagreb Mildura SC in 1978. The club is a member of the Mildura Sunraysia Soccer Association and competes in the top competition.

The Knights are the most successful club in Mildura, having been Sunraysia league champions 11 times and Sunraysia Cup winners 7 times. The club has competed many times in the Australian-Croatian Soccer Tournament, and it hosted the event in 1984.
