= Australian-Croatian Soccer Tournament =

- Organiser(s): CSA Australia Savez
- Founded: 1974; 52 years ago
- Region: Australia; New Zealand
- Teams: Varies
- Current champions: Sydney United
- Most championships: Sydney United (12 titles)
- Website: croatian.savez

The Australian-Croatian Soccer Tournament, also known as Croatian Soccer Tournament (Croatian: Hrvatski nogometni turnir) is an annual tournament run by the Croatian Soccer Federation of Australia and New Zealand, an organisation founded in 1974. The inspiration for the tournament came from the successful examples in North America with the Croatian-North American Soccer Tournament founded in 1964 and West Coast Croatian Soccer Tournament founded in 1973.

The Tournament kicked off in 1974 with a trial event staged in Melbourne where six soccer clubs participated at Melbourne Croatia's ground, Montgomery Park in Essendon. Only six clubs participated. The Tournament's beginning was spawned from Melbourne Croatia's expulsion from the Victorian Soccer Federation in 1972, with the clubs leadership including Tony Vrzina and Josip Solic together with Mirko Furjanic, the now Honorary President of the Tournament, being instrumental in getting the Tournament established.

The first official Tournament was staged in 1975, hosted by Sydney Croatia and won out by Canberra FC who defeated Sydney Croatia 3–1 in the Final. The Tournament has gone on to become the largest and oldest ethnic football tournament in Australia, having been hosted in every state and territory except for the Northern Territory. It also holds the honour of being the oldest national soccer competition still running in Australia.

Melbourne Knights and Sydney United are the only two clubs to hold Life Membership to the Australian Croatian Soccer Federation due to their pioneering in the early days in establishing the Tournament, as well as their success on the national footballing stage.

== List of Tournaments ==
Year	Host	Division 1 Winner	Women's Winner	Division 2 Winner	Masters Winner	Veterans Winner
2026	St Albans Saints (4) /Strathmore Split	Sydney United (12)	Canberra Croatia FC (9)	Melbourne Knights	Gospić Bears (3)	Gospić Bears (2)
2025	Gold Coast Knights (4)	Gold Coast Knights	Gold Coast Knights	Gold Coast Knights	Strathmore Split (2)	Gospić Bears
2024	St Albans Saints (3)	Sydney United (11)	North Geelong Warriors (5)	Kralj Tomislav (2)	Gospić Bears (2)	Strathmore Split
2023	Adelaide Raiders (8)	Sydney United (10)	St Albans Saints	Kralj Tomislav	Gospić Bears	Melbourne Knights
2022	Kralj Tomislav Sydney (3)	St Albans Saints (10)	North Geelong Warriors (4)	Hurstville ZFC	Sydney United	Hurstville ZFC
2021	Gold Coast Knights (N/A)	Cancelled due to COVID19				
2020	North Geelong Warriors (N/A)	Cancelled due to COVID19				
2019	Dandenong City	Dandenong City	Canberra Croatia FC (8)	HNK Edensor Park	Dandenong City	Gold Coast Knights
2018	Gold Coast Knights (3)	Melbourne Knights (7)	Canberra Croatia FC (7)	Sunnyside Croata	Dalmacija Sydney (2)	
2017	Canberra Croatia FC (5)	St Albans Saints (9)	Canberra Croatia FC (6)	Brisbane Knights	Hurstville ZFC	
2016	Adelaide Raiders (7)	St Albans Saints (8)	Canberra Croatia FC (5)	Strathmore Split (2)	Dalmacija Sydney	
2015	Brisbane Knights (4)	Melbourne Knights (6)	North Geelong Warriors (3)	Gospić Bears	Strathmore Split	
2014	South Coast United (2)	North Geelong Warriors	Canberra Croatia FC (4)	Strathmore Split	South Coast United	
2013	Melbourne Knights (5)	Melbourne Knights (5)	Canberra Croatia FC (3)	NK Bunker	Melbourne Knights	
2012	Gold Coast Knights (2)	Melbourne Knights (4)	Auckland Croatia	Mostar Melbourne	Gold Coast Knights	
2011	Kralj Tomislav Sydney (2)	Melbourne Knights (3)	Canberra Croatia FC (2)	South Coast United		
2010	Auckland Croatia	Melbourne Knights (2)	North Geelong Warriors (2)	Luddenham Bosna		
2009	Adelaide Raiders (6)	Adelaide Raiders (5)	North Fremantle Croatia (3)	Auckland Croatia		
2008	North Geelong Warriors (4)	St Albans Saints (7)	North Fremantle Croatia (2)	Melbourne Tornado		
2007	Western Knights (2)	Ljubuski FC	North Fremantle Croatia			
2006	Sydney United (3)	Sydney United (9)	Canberra Croatia FC			
2005	Melbourne Knights (4)	Canberra Croatia FC (6)	North Geelong Warriors			
2004	Canberra Croatia FC (4)	O'Connor Knights				
2003	Luddenham Bosna	Auckland Croatia				
2002	Adelaide Raiders (5)	Adelaide Raiders (4)				
2001	Brisbane Knights (3)	Canberra Croatia FC (5)				
2000	St Albans Saints (2)	St Albans Saints (6)				
1999	Hurstville ZFC	Hajduk Sydney				
1998	North Geelong Warriors (3)	St Albans Saints (5)				
1997	Adelaide Raiders (4)	Adelaide Raiders (3)				
1996	Canberra Croatia FC (3)	Sydney United (8)				
1995	Gold Coast Knights	Adelaide Raiders (2)				
1994	South Coast United	Canberra Croatia FC (4)				
1993	Melbourne Knights (3)	Melbourne Knights				
1992	North Geelong Warriors	Canberra Croatia FC (3)				
1991	Adelaide Raiders (3)	St Albans Saints (4)				
1990	St Albans Saints	St Albans Saints (3)				
1989	Brisbane Knights (2)	Sydney United (7)				
1988	Canberra Croatia FC (2)	Sydney United (6)				
1987	Sydney United (2)	Sydney United (5)				
1986	Melbourne Knights (2)	Canberra Croatia FC (2)				
1985	Adelaide Raiders (2)	St Albans Saints (2)				
1984	Irymple Knights	Adelaide Raiders				
1983	North Geelong Warriors	St Albans Saints				
1982	Brisbane Knights	Brisbane Knights				
1981	Kralj Tomislav Sydney	Sydney United (4)				
1980	Glenorchy Knights	Western Knights				
1979	Western Knights	Sydney United (3)				
1978	Canberra Croatia FC	Sydney United (2)				
1977	Adelaide Raiders	Whyalla Croatia				
1976	Melbourne Knights	Sydney United				
1975	Sydney United	Canberra Croatia FC				
1974 ^	Melbourne Knights	Sydney United				

^ 1974 Tournament was a trial event (unofficial)

== Tournament Winners ==
- Sydney United, 12 titles
- St Albans Saints, 10 titles
- Melbourne Knights, 7 titles
- Canberra FC, 6 titles
- Adelaide Raiders, 5 titles
- Gold Coast Knights 1 title
- Dandenong City, 1 title
- North Geelong Warriors, 1 title
- Whyalla Croatia, 1 title
- Western Knights, 1 title
- Ljubuski FC, 1 title
- Hajduk Sydney, 1 title
- O'Connor Knights, 1 title
- Auckland Croatia, 1 title
- Brisbane Knights, 1 title

== Women's Tournament Winners ==
- Canberra FC, 9 titles
- North Geelong Warriors, 5 titles
- North Fremantle 3 titles
- Gold Coast Knights 1 title
- St Albans Saints 1 title
- Auckland Croatia 1 title

== See also ==
- List of Croatian football clubs in Australia
- Croatian Australian
