= Brisbane Knights FC =

Brisbane Knights
- Full name: Brisbane Knights Football Club
- Nicknames: Croatia, Brisbane Croatia, Rocklea United
- Founded: 1957
- Ground: Croatian Sports Center, Rocklea
- Capacity: 1,500
- Head coach: Damon Redknap
- League: Queensland Premier League 2
- 2026: 6th of 12
- Website: https://www.brisbaneknightsfc.com.au/

Brisbane Knights Football Club is an Australian soccer club from Rocklea, a suburb of Brisbane, Queensland, Australia. They will be competing in the Football Queensland Premier League 2, the 4th division on the football pyramid of Australia, after achieving promotion from Brisbane Premier League in 2024.

== History ==
The club was initially formed in 1952 under the name HNK Croatia Brisbane but struggled to sustain a full squad of players for the entire season, so the club disbanded. With the steady growth of the Croatian community in following years, the club was reformed in 1957. On 15 May 1957 the club was registered with the governing federation as an official soccer club.

The club also played under the names New Farm SC (from 1971 to 1974), Sunnyside United SC (1975–1987), Croatia Soccer Club (1988), Brisbane Croatia Soccer Club and Rocklea United SC(from 1989 to 2012). In the early years the club played at council grounds throughout Brisbane until 1970, when the local Croatian community purchased 50-odd acres of land at Rocklea, an inner city south-west suburb of Brisbane. In the 1980s the club competed in the Brisbane Premier League until relegation in 1994.

=== Recent History ===
After relegation from the Capital League 1 in 2013, the Knights managed immediate promotion in 2014, finishing runners up in the Capital League 2. In 2015, Knights finished fifth in League 1. Brisbane Knights hosted the 41st annual Australian-Croatian Soccer Tournament in October 2015. It was the fourth time the Queensland club hosted the tournament, having previously hosted in 1982 (winning the tournament for the first and only time to date), 1989 and 2001. Melbourne Knights FC took out their sixth title at the tournament.

After another mid-table finish in 2016, Knights finished in third place in League 1 in 2017 and were promoted back to the Brisbane Premier League due to a league re-structure, where Football Queensland Premier League became the new state-wide second tier and the BPL became the third state tier. The Knights finished in the lower half of the BPL table in both 2018 and 2019.

In January 2020, it was announced that Gold Coast Knights SC had assumed control of Brisbane Knights Football Club.

The COVID-19 pandemic saw the Brisbane Knights field one Men's Brisbane Premier League squad. All matches were played as away fixtures whilst extensive repairs were conducted to the fields of the Brisbane Knights by the Gold Coast Knights Football Club.

In 2021, the Brisbane Knights re-assumed control with the guidance from the Gold Coast Knights Football Club with teams in the Men's Brisbane Premier League, Masters Competition and Women's Brisbane City League.

Their home continues to be the Croatian Club Brisbane in Rocklea and in February 2021, the main playing field was renamed the Ivan "Johnny" Mesic Memorial Field, named in honour of one the founders of the club.

In 2022 it saw the Brisbane Knights finish mid-table once again. 2023 was a pivotal year for the Brisbane Knights as it saw them finish as premiers and grand final champions in the new Football Queensland Premier League 4 – Metro system and promote into Football Queensland Premier League 3 – Metro.

2024 was once again another successful year for the Brisbane Knights as it saw them again gain promotion from Football Queensland Premier League 3 – Metro to Football Queensland Premier League 2, after once again winning a back-to-back premiership, a first in the clubs history.

== Honours ==
(as Brisbane Knights)

- Australian-Croatian Soccer Tournament Champions 1982
- Ampol Cup Runner Up 1985
- Football Queensland Premier League 3 – Metro Premiers 2024
- Division 2/Capital League 1/Queensland Premier League 4 -Metro Premiers 1987, 2023
- Division 2/Capital League 1/Queensland Premier League 4 -Metro Runner Up 1990
- Capital League 2/Queensland Premier League 5 -Metro Runner Up 2014

(as Rocklea United)

- Division 1/Capital League 1 Final Champions 1999
- Division 1/Capital League 1 League Runner Up 1998, 1999

== Players ==
=== First team squad ===
As of 17 June 2025

Note: Flags indicate national team as defined under FIFA eligibility rules; some limited exceptions apply. Players may hold more than one non-FIFA nationality.

No.	Pos.	Nation	Player
1	GK	CHN	Ke Wei
2	DF	CHN	Jack Qiu
3	DF	CRO	Daniel Simic
4	DF	AUS	Sean Gilder
5	DF	AUS	James Le-McKay
7	FW	NGR	Frederick Yinka-kehinde
8	FW	RWA	Jean D’Amour Manirambona
9	MF	KOR	Sang Woo Lee
10	FW	AUS	Tomas Lemic
11	FW	JPN	Bright Machida
13	MF	KOR	Hoyeon Shin
15	DF	CGO	Wellars Muzuri

No.	Pos.	Nation	Player
16	FW	AUS	Niko Boban
17	DF	CGO	Patient Lungwe
18	DF	CHN	Xuejun Zhou
19	MF	CGO	Fiston Chungu
20	GK	AUS	Riley Nicholl
—	DF	AUS	Aidan Norris
—	FW	AUS	Michael Cule
—	DF	AUS	Jackson Leko
—	DF	JPN	Rae McGeown
—	DF	CHN	Fan Chu

== Notable players ==
- Dario Vidošić
- Takeru Okada

== See also ==
- List of Croatian football clubs in Australia
- Australian-Croatian Soccer Tournament
