= St Albans Dinamo SC =

St Albans Dinamo
- Full name: St Albans Dinamo Soccer Club
- Nicknames: Dinamo; Saints
- Founded: 1954; 72 years ago 1975 (as Dinamo SC)
- Ground: Churchill Reserve
- Capacity: 3,500
- Manager: Cameron Watson
- League: NPL Victoria
- 2026: 8th of 14
- Website: www.stalbanssaints.com
Home colours	Away colours

St Albans Dinamo Soccer Club, formerly known as St Albans Saints Soccer Club between 1993 and 2023, is an Australian semi-professional soccer club based in St Albans, Victoria. Established by local Croatian Australians as Dinamo, the club is a regular participant in the Australian-Croatian Soccer Tournament.

The club is closely associated with its sister club the Melbourne Knights to which many of its academy players transfer to. Dinamo won promotion to the National Premier League (NPL) Victoria for the 2017 season but, after finishing second last, was relegated to the NPL 2. The club once again won promotion in back to the National Premier League (NPL) Victoria after winning the NPL Victoria 2 West in 2019.

== History ==
=== Formation and early years ===
The club was formed by Croatian migrants as Dinamo in 1975. The club based its identity on the Croatian club GNK Dinamo Zagreb. In 1982, Dinamo took over the German backed St Albans Soccer Club, which was near bankruptcy. The club took on the name St Albans Dinamo and took residence at Churchill Reserve in St Albans. The club still remains there to this day. The club would go on to build a social club there which holds 400 patrons. It has become an important meeting place for the local Croatian community.

=== Climbing the football pyramid ===
St Albans Dinamo won its first title in 1983, winning the Victorian State League Division 2 with Melbourne Knights legends Billy Vojtek (former Socceroo) and Branko Culina leading the way. Billy Vojtek was the league's top goal scorer with 16 goals. The following year the club joined the Victorian Premier League, skipping Division 1, after several VPL clubs joined the expanded National Soccer League. The club had a poor first year in 1984, finishing 12th and narrowly surviving relegation.

By the late 1980s the club had become one of the leading sides in the competition. From 1986 to 1989 the club finished in the top 5 each season. 1988 was the season the club came closest to winning the championship, they finished 4th only 3 points behind first place. In this time the club produced many great players like Ivan Duzel, Ivan Kelic, Velimir Kupersak and Oliver Pondeljak, all of whom went on to great success in the National Soccer League.

Over the next decade the club would struggle, with fluctuating results. The only joy came in 1993 with the club finishing 5th and making the finals. But the club was eliminated at the first phase, losing to Sunshine George Cross. But this period was marked by more young talent being produced by the club, in particular Ante Kovacevic and Tom Pondeljak. Both players went to win the National Soccer League championship with the Melbourne Knights.

In 1998 the club had its most successful season. The club finished first, winning the Minor Premiership. Striker Harry Karl had a great season scoring 23 goals, to finish 2nd on the goal scoring chart. The club made the Grand Final against the Bulleen Inter Kings. In a thrilling match Bulleen were up 2–0 by the 54th minute. But 10 minutes later St Albans had leveled in a remarkable comeback. The joy was short lived, with seven minutes remaining Bulleen scored what would be the winning goal.

=== The 21st century ===
After this stand out season, the club would go back to being a mid-table side. In 2005, the club was relegated from the Victorian Premier League, having played 23 consecutive seasons in the state's top tier. Needing only a draw to survive the drop, the club was relegated in the final round after losing to Heidelberg United.

Five seasons in the State League 1 would follow, but then in 2010, under the guidance of head coach Kruni Ražov, Dinamo would top the table and earn promotion back to the Victorian Premier League. Despite high profiles signings such as Tomislav Milardovic and Daniel Višević, the club won just three of its 24 games in the VPL and was subsequently relegated back to State League 1. St Albans had a tough time in State 1, finishing 9th in the 12 team league in 2012 and then 8th in 2013.

=== National Premier Leagues Victoria ===
In 2014, Football Federation Victoria introduced the National Premier Leagues Victoria and Dinamo had their bid for a place in the new competition accepted. The side was placed in the NPL1 division, which was the second tier of football in Victoria, meaning Dinamo retained the place they had in the Victorian football pyramid previously. In the first season of the NPL, St Albans finished in 6th place, pushing for promotion until the latter part of the season.

The 2014 season will be remembered by the Saints' impressive 2014 FFA Cup run. St Albans beat FC Clifton Hill, Avondale FC, Eastern Lions SC and Northcote City FC to qualify for the FFA Cup Round of 32. Dinamo drew Parramatta FC at the Melita Stadium in Sydney, Australia. Barry Devlin scored the lone goal as Dinamo progressed to the Round of 16. Dinamo then drew A-League side Perth Glory. The match was played at sister-club Melbourne Knights' Knights Stadium. The game was played in front of 3,500 supporters, with the entire Victorian Croatian community rallying around the side for this huge encounter. Unfortunately, Dinamo lost by four goals to one, as their fully professional opponents' quality shone through in the second half. St Albans sacked head coach Toby Paterson and his son Brodie in September 2014, after an altercation broke out in their Round 23 NPL clash against Richmond SC. Captain Ryan McGuffie took on a caretaker player-coach role, leading the side in the remainder of the 2014 season. At the club's AGM towards the end of 2014, Richmond FC star ruckman Ivan Marić was appointed as president of the club.

In 2015, the Club finished in 6th place once more, a promising start once again unravelled by a poor second half of the season. Head coach Joe Kovacevic, appointed for the 2015 season, was dismissed with five rounds to go after poor results. Franz Weimper took over for the remainder of the season in a caretaker role.

Prior to the beginning of the 2016 pre-season, St Albans announced that Željko Kuzman had been appointed as head manager of the senior side with Steve Bebić his assistant. Kuzman's previous role was assistant manager at Richmond SC. After losing Stuart Webster and Ross Harvey to Geelong SC, St Albans brought in Richmond winger Josh Knight, Port Melbourne's Andrew Miličević and North Geelong's Michael Grgić. In early June, with the Club sitting in 5th place on the NPL2 West ladder, senior coaches Zeljko Kuzman, Steve Bebic and Theo Mihailidis decided to part ways with the club, citing "irreconcilable differences with the committee" as the reason behind their departure. Dinamo brought Kruni Ražov back to the club as head manager, with Josip Lončarić his assistant. Dinamo won automatic promotion to the NPLV on the final matchday of the NPLV 2 West season, with a 1–0 win over Whittlesea Ranges FC placing the side three points clear of second-placed North Geelong. Dinamo's record under Ražov in 2016 read ten wins, two draws and one loss.

Dinamo finished in second-bottom place in 2017, nine points adrift of the relegation play-off spot, returning to NPL2 for 2018.

In 2018, St Albans finished in second place, qualifying for the NPL2 promotion playoff, but lost to Moreland City FC 4–1.

In 2019, St Albans won the NPL Victoria 2 West, securing promotion back to the NPL Victoria, after defeating Melbourne Victory FC Youth 2-1 in the final match of the season.

In 2024, the club hosted the Australian-Croatian Soccer Tournament for the third time, which was won by Sydney United 58 FC. In 2025, Dinamo celebrated their 50th anniversary.

== Supporters ==
The club's supporters are primarily from the local Croatian community in St Albans, as well as from surrounding suburbs such as Sunshine, Keilor, Taylors Lakes, Delahey, Hillside, Footscray, Caroline Springs and Sydenham. Though their support also stretches out to the greater Croatian community in Melbourne. They are third most popular Croatian backed club in Victoria behind the Melbourne Knights and North Geelong Warriors.

== Current squad ==
=== Senior team ===
Note: Flags indicate national team as defined under FIFA eligibility rules; some limited exceptions apply. Players may hold more than one non-FIFA nationality.

No.	Pos.	Nation	Player
1	GK	AUS	Marko Bulic
2	DF	AUS	Ajak Deu
3	DF	AUS	Alec Mills
5	DF	AUS	Fletcher McFarlane
6	DF	AUS	James Xydias
8	MF	ENG	Brian Summerskill
9	FW	ENG	Mickel Platt
10	MF	AUS	Oliver Dragicevic
11	MF	AUS	Joseph Monek
13	MF	AUS	Joseph Colina

No.	Pos.	Nation	Player
16	DF	AUS	Michael Grgic (captain)
17	MF	AUS	Luka Cabraja
18	FW	AUS	Joshua Gulevski
19	FW	AUS	Emmanuel Peters
21	GK	AUS	Jacson Riley
24	DF	AUS	Johnny Maglaris
98	MF	AUS	Anton Bilic
99	MF	AUS	Lucas Byrns
—	DF	AUS	Gideon Arok

== Honours ==
- Victorian Premier league Premiers 1998
- Victorian Premier League Runner-Up 1998
- Victorian Premier League finalists (playoffs) 1993, 1998
- Victorian State League Cup Runner-Up 1989
- Victorian State League Cup Top 4 Finalists 1986, 1988, 1989
- National Premier Leagues Victoria 2 West Champions 2016, 2019
- Victorian Division 1 Champions 2009, 2010
- Victorian Division 2 Champions 1983
- Australian Croatian Soccer Tournament Champions 1983, 1985, 1990, 1991, 1998, 2000, 2008, 2016, 2017, 2022

== Individual honours ==
Victorian Premier League Gold Medal – VPL Player of the Year

- 1985 – Branko Culina
- 1989 – Velimir Kupersak
- 1995 – Tom Pondeljak
- 2000 – Damian Vojtek

Bill Fleming Medal – Media voted VPL Player of the Year

- 1988 – Ivan Duzel
- 1989 – Velimir Kupersak

Victorian Premier league Coach of the Year

- 1998 – Vlado Vanis

Victorian Premier League Leading Goal Scorer

- 1987 – Denis Morovic 18 goals
- 1988 – Ivan Kelic 17 goals

Victorian Premier League Jim Rooney Medal – Grand Final Man of the Match

- 1998 – Slavko Rados

== See also ==
- List of Croatian football clubs in Australia
- Australian-Croatian Soccer Tournament
- Croatian Australian
