= Goulburn Strikers FC =

- Logo: Goulburn Strikers FC
- Full name: Goulburn Strikers Football Club
- Nickname: Strikers
- Founded: 2001
- Ground: Strikers Park; Avoca Street, Goulburn
- Capacity: 1,000
- Chairman: Tim McGrath
- Head Coach: Adam Mills
- League: Southern Tablelands Football
- Website: https://www.facebook.com/goulburnstrikersfc
Home colours	Away colours

The Goulburn Strikers Football Club is an Australian football (soccer) club based in Goulburn, New South Wales, Australia. Established in 2001, the club was known until 2009 as Southern Tablelands Football Association STFA Strikers. The club currently competes in the Southern Tablelands Football all age men league, hosting matches at their home ground Strikers Park.

== History ==
The Goulburn Strikers were founded in late 2001 to offer the Southern Tablelands' most talented players the opportunity to play at a higher level while representing their hometown.

In 2002, under the Southern Tablelands Football Association (STFA) banner, the Strikers started competing, entering two senior teams (First Grade and Reserves Grade) in the ACT State League. Soon the Strikers developed into a regional football force.

In 2003 the Strikers became the ACT State League Division 2 Champions and were promoted to Division 1.

In 2005 the Strikers and the STFA ratified their commitment to access the prestigious ACT Premier League within five years.

As time went on and the Strikers became more successful it was soon obvious that a development program was necessary and in 2007, with the full support of the STFA, the club entered an Under 18s and an Under 16s squads in the ACT Junior League.
Also in 2007, the Strikers were ACT League Division 1 Runners up.

In 2008 the Strikers became the undefeated ACT State League Division 1 Champions.
The club's development program also proved to be of the highest quality as in the same year the Strikers Under 18’s became ACT Junior League Division 1 Premiers and the Under 16’s were the undefeated NSW Southern Branch Champions as well as the ACT Junior League Division 1 Premiers.

In 2009 the Strikers were ACT League Division 1 Runners up and for the first time ever, the Strikers made it through to the ACT Federation Cup Quarter Finals, showing to be already competitive at Premier League level.
Also in 2009, the Strikers for the first time entered the NSW Tiger Turf Cup reaching the third round. In the process, the Strikers knocked out clubs such as NSW Super League giants Macarthur Rams.
In the same year, the Strikers Under 18s were back-to-back ACT Junior League Division 1 Premiers, while the Under 16s were Runners up in their Division.
Later in 2009 the Strikers applied to Capital Football for a three-year Premier League licence and were successful in gaining access in the ACT Premier League in 2010.

In 2010 The Goulburn Strikers reached the Final of the ACT Federation Cup losing out to Canberra FC (2–3). The Strikers began their premier league life in great fashion with victories against some of the ACT's best sides. Unfortunately, the season petered out and the Strikers finished mid table.

2011 proved to be the toughest season in Strikers history as they were outclassed in the premier league with many heavy defeats. Unable to compete financially with the Capital Football heavyweights the Strikers were forced to forgo their third season in Premier League returning to the State Leagues.

2012 saw the Strikers finish mid table in a season with few highlights.

In 2013 the Goulburn Strikers finished the league season in third place and were eliminated in the semi-finals. The Strikers were not to be denied however in 2014 when under the leadership of Coach Robin Caulfield the Strikers finished second in the league only to go on to win the Grand final.

== Teams ==
The Goulburn Strikers have entered the following teams in the Capital Football competitions in 2015:

- Men's State League 1
- U15's Boys
- U13's Boys
- Women's State League 1
- Women's Under 19's
- Men's Over 35's

== Honours ==
CLUB:

- 2003 ACT State League Division 2 Champions.
- 2007 ACT State League Division 1 Runners Up.
- 2008 ACT State League Division 1 Champions.
- 2009 ACT State League Division 1 Runners Up.
- 2010 ACT Federation Cup Finalists.
- 2014 ACT State League Div 3 Finalists.
- 2015 ACT State League Div 3 Runners up.
- 2015 ACT State League Div 3 Grand final winners.

INDIVIDUAL: List of Individual award winners who won awards while playing for Goulburn Strikers FC.

- 2007 ACT State League Division 1 "Golden Boot Winner" – Brody Willis
- 2008 ACT State League Division 1 "Golden Boot Winner" – Daniel Aliffi

== Current players ==
1ST GRADE Note: Flags indicate national team as defined under FIFA eligibility rules; some limited exceptions apply. Players may hold more than one non-FIFA nationality.

No.	Pos.	Nation	Player
7	DF	AUS	David Albrighton
8	MF	AUS	Benny Hartin
9	ST	AUS	Adam Mills
—	DF	AUS	Ben Bywaters
3	DF	AUS	James McMasters
4	MF	ENG	Jason Dinsmore
5	MF	AUS	James Fry
6	MF	AUS	Luke Hartin
—	ST	LBR	Dakis Dennis
—	MF	SDN	Musare Gasirimu
—	ST	KEN	Antipas Ojiwang
1	GK	AUS	Justin Daly
—	MF	CHN	Haowei Huang
—	DF	AUS	Doug McLennan
—	MF	AUS	Josh Purtell
—	MF	AUS	Pjero Mardesic
—	MF	AUS	Tristan Clarke
—	DF	NIR	Marc Brown
—	FW	KOR	Eunseok Choi
—	MF	KOR	Jeongmo Koo

== Sponsors ==
The Goulburn Strikers receive financial assistance from several Goulburn Businesses and Companies.
The Goulburn Workers Club are the Club's major sponsors. Goulburn Engineering Welsh Realestate Wilson Plumbing Gouburn Country Motors Veolia Mulwaree Trust Recognition First Elders Insurance Jigsaw Tax Argyle Medical Centre
