= Dandenong City SC =

Dandenong City
- Full name: Dandenong City Soccer Club Hajduk
- Nicknames: Dandy, City, Hajduk
- Founded: 1963; 63 years ago (merged with Chelsea Hajduk end of 2008; 18 years ago)
- Ground: Frank Holohan Soccer Complex
- Capacity: 4000
- President: Berislav Jurešić
- Manager: Nick Tolios
- League: NPL Victoria
- 2026: 9th of 14
Home colours	Away colours

Dandenong City Soccer Club, commonly as Dandenong City Hajduk and formerly known as Chelsea Hajduk, is an Australian soccer club based in the South-East region of Melbourne, Victoria. The club's home is at Frank Holohan Soccer Complex in the suburb of Endeavour Hills. They compete in the NPL Victoria, which is the top tier of football in Victoria, having been promoted for the first time for the 2019 season.

The club was founded in 1981 as Parkmore Hajduk, then was renamed Chelsea Hajduk by the Croatian Australian community in Melbourne's south-eastern suburbs. In 2008 Chelsea Hajduk merged with Dandenong City, keeping the latter's name.

== History ==
Logo of Dandenong City until 2025.

In 2008, Dandenong City Soccer Club was approached by Chelsea Soccer Club about a possible merger of the two clubs. Chelsea was competing in Victorian State League 2 at the time. Chelsea SC, known colloquially as Hajduk, after the Croatian football club HNK Hajduk Split, had around 250 juniors and 350 total players at the club, struggling to accommodate all of its sides. The amalgamation was finalised in December 2008. The newly combined club kept the name Dandenong City Soccer Club and continued to play out of the former's home ground of Frank Holohan Soccer Complex.

Dandenong City finished in fourth place in the 2009 Victorian State League Division Two South-East its first season as a new club. In 2010, former National Soccer League and A-League striker Ante Milicic was signed by the club. In 2011, Dandy City won its first championship since the amalgamation, taking out State League Two South-East and earning promotion to State League One. City were relegated in 2012, finishing in 11th place in the 12 team league, with only rivals Springvale White Eagles finishing lower. In 2013, Dandenong City finished in second place in the Victorian State League 2 Two South-East, but missed out on promotion to State League 1 after losing a playoff against Avondale FC.

This was not to matter, though, as through City's acceptance into the National Premier Leagues Victoria 1 in 2014 meant that the club jumped from the old third to the new second tier of soccer in Victoria. In City's maiden campaign in NPL1, the side endured a largely challenging campaign, finishing 10th in the 14 team competition. Ivan Duzel led the side throughout 2014, but departed at season's end. The club found success in the promotion of young players in the senior squad, with Marko Stevanja, Nick Glavan and Damian Miskulin all impressing with the first team and going on to sign with National Youth League sides Melbourne City FC (Stevanja) and Melbourne Victory FC (Glavan and Miskulin).

Dandenong City appointed Aaron Healey as the head coach for the upcoming 2015 season. Healey was previously the club's technical director. The NPL1 division split into an East and West conference in 2015, with both conferences compromising of 10 teams, playing each team in their own conference twice and the teams in the opposite conference once. Dandenong finished 3rd in the East conference, seven points off the second-placed Melbourne Victory FC Youth. A highlight of the season came in a 5–0 win over promoted side Melbourne Victory at the Frank Holohan Soccer Complex.

City experienced an inconsistent first half of the season in 2016, entering the mid-season transfer window in 4th place in NPL2 East, with 7 wins, 2 draws and 5 losses, 12 points off the promotion play-off second place. It finished the 2016 season in 3rd place, 21 points off second-placed neighbours Dandenong Thunder. Following the side's final round 3–2 loss to Box Hill United, City announced the departure of senior coach Aaron Healey and his assistant Gerry McDonagh.

For the 2017 NPL2 East season, City announced that Stuart Munro had been appointed as the club's new senior head coach, with former Melbourne Victory midfielder Tom Pondeljak named as his assistant. Dandy started its 2017 recruitment in sensational fashion, securing the services of Adelaide United A-League championship winning winger Mate Dugandzic. The club also signed former A-League players Nick Kalmar and Ljubo Milicevic. City finished the regular season in second place, 11 points off league champions Thunder. Shaun Filipović took out the golden boot with 19 goals. After defeating Moreland Zebras in the promotion playoff, Dandenong City faced Melbourne Knights, with the winner taking a spot in the National Premier Leagues Victoria top flight for 2018. A Kym Harris hattrick saw Knights race out to a 3–0 lead. Two goals in the last five minutes gave City hope, but the match ultimately ended 3–2 and Knights kept its spot in the NPL.

After three seasons of coming close, Dandenong City, under the management of Željko Kuzman, finally achieved promotion to the top flight in 2018, after taking out the NPL2 East league title.

The 2019 season was the first time in the club's history competing in the state's top flight. For their debut season in the NPL Victoria top division, City signed former professional footballers Petar Franjic, Diogo Ferreira and Mark Ochieng. In April 2019, after a win, a draw and seven losses in the 2019 season, including a 4–3 loss to local rivals Thunder after leading the game 3–0, Kuzman and assistant coach Steve Bebić departed the club. The club appointed former National Soccer League footballer Ante Moric as the new senior head coach, with former Socceroo Saša Ognenovski also joining the coaching staff. In the mid-season transfer window, City released Franjic, Ferreira and Ochieng, but bolstered the squad with three high-profile signings in Adrian Leijer, Carl Valeri and Brendon Santalab. The new coaching staff and new players were able to turn the club's fortunes around, with Dandy finishing in 7th place. In the post-season, Dandenong City hosted the 45th Australian-Croatian Soccer Tournament for the first time and became champions also for the first time, with a 1–0 win over NPL Queensland champions Gold Coast Knights.

In the post-season, head coach Moric took up a position with new A-League side Western United FC and Ognenovski was appointed as Dandenong City's coach for the 2020 season.

== Current squad ==
As of 28 March 2026 Note: Flags indicate national team as defined under FIFA eligibility rules; some limited exceptions apply. Players may hold more than one non-FIFA nationality.

No.	Pos.	Nation	Player
1	GK	AUS	Pierce Clark
2	DF	AUS	Mason Benjamin
3	DF	AUS	Jack Peraic-Cullen
4	DF	AUS	Corey Sewell
5	DF	ENG	Jack Webster
6	DF	AUS	Harry Ascroft
7	FW	ENG	Brad Plant
8	MF	WAL	Jamie Latham
9	FW	AUS	Zander Guy
10	FW	AUS	Pierce Waring
11	DF	SCO	Archie Macphee
13	MF	AUS	Valli Cesnik

No.	Pos.	Nation	Player
15	DF	JPN	Gaku Inaba
17	MF	AUS	Danny Kim
18	MF	AUS	Oscar Colgate-Jones
21	MF	AUS	Matthew Giofkou
22	FW	AUS	Timothy Atherinos
23	FW	AUS	Will Bower
25	MF	AUS	George Lambadaridis
28	MF	GRE	Anastasios Georgakopoulos
30	MF	AUS	Malik Abuusba
31	GK	AUS	Matthew Marrum
38	DF	AUS	Jackson Lino

== Senior coaching staff ==
- Technical Director of Football:
- First Team Coach: Nick Tolios

== Honours ==
- NPL Victoria Runners Up: 2025
- Australian-Croatian Soccer Tournament Champions: 2019
- Australian-Croatian Soccer Tournament Runner-Up: 1988, 2005, 2012
- National Premier Leagues Victoria 2 Champions: 2018, 2023
- Victorian State League Division 2 South-East Champions: 2011
- Victorian State League Division 3 South-East Champions: 2004
- Victorian Provisional League Division 1 South-East Champions: 2003
- Victorian Provisional League Division 1 Champions: 1987
- Victorian Amateur League Division 1 Champions: 1982
- Victorian Provisional Cup Winners: 2003

Chelsea Hajduk squad in 2007

=== Bayside Football Association ===
- Division 1 Winner – Dandenong Thirds: 2010
- Division 2 Winner – Dandenong Thirds: 2009
- Bayside FA Cup Runner-Up – Dandenong Thirds: 2009
- Division 2 Runner-Up – Chelsea Old Boys: 2008
- Premier League Winner – Chelsea Young Boys: 2005
- Division 1 Winner – Chelsea Young Boys: 2004
- Division 2 Runner-Up – Chelsea Old Boys: 2004
- Division 2 Winner – Chelsea Young Boys: 2003
- Division 3 Winner – Chelsea Old Boys: 2003

== Senior team finishing position ==
- 1980 – District League Division Three (8th)
- 1981 – District League Division Three (6th)
- 1982 – Amateur League Division One (1st – promoted)
- 1983 – Provisional League Division Four (8th)

Hajduk Parkmore merged with Chelsea

- 1984 – Provisional League Division One (5th)
- 1985 – Victorian Provisional League Division One (12th – relegated)
- 1986 – Victorian Provisional League Division Two (2nd – promoted)
- 1987 – Victorian Provisional League Division One (1st – promoted)
- 1988 –Victorian League Division Four (2nd – promoted)
- 1989 – Victorian League Division Three (2nd – promoted)
- 1990 – Victorian League Division Two (5th)
- 1991 – State League Division Two (?)
- 1992 – State League Division Two (7th)
- 1993 – State League Division Two (7th)
- 1994 – State League Division Two (8th)
- 1995 – State League Division Two (11th – relegated)
- 1996 – State League Division Three (13th)
- 1997 – State League Division Three (3rd)
- 1998 – State League Division Three (14th – relegated)
- 1999 – State League Division Four (13th)
- 2000 – State League Division Three South-East (3rd)
- 2001 – State League Division Three South-East (5th)
- 2002 – State League Division Three South-East (11th – relegated)
- 2003 – Provisional League Division One South-East (1st – promoted)
- 2004 – State League Division Three South-East (1st – promoted)
- 2005 – State League Division Two South-East (5th)
- 2006 – State League Division Two South-East (8th)
- 2007 – State League Division Two South-East (7th)
- 2008 – State League Division Two South-East (4th)

Hajduk Chelsea merged with Dandenong City

- 2009 – State League Division Two South-East (4th)
- 2010 – State League Division Two South-East (7th)
- 2011 – State League Division Two South-East (1st – promoted)
- 2012 – State League Division One (11th – relegated)
- 2013 – State League Division Two South-East (2nd)
- 2014 – National Premier Leagues Victoria 2 (10th)
- 2015 – National Premier Leagues Victoria 2 (3rd East, 7th overall)
- 2016 – National Premier Leagues Victoria 2 (3rd East, 7th overall)
- 2017 – National Premier Leagues Victoria 2 (2nd East, 4th overall, lost promotion playoff)
- 2018 – National Premier Leagues Victoria 2 (1st – promoted)
- 2019 – National Premier Leagues Victoria (7th overall – 1st year in NPL)
- 2020 – National Premier Leagues Victoria (12th - cancelled after 5/26 matches played due to the COVID-19 Pandemic)
- 2021 – National Premier Leagues Victoria (12th - cancelled after 18/26 matches played due to the COVID-19 Pandemic)
- 2022 – National Premier Leagues Victoria (13th – relegated)
- 2023 – Victorian Premier League (1st – promoted)
- 2024 – National Premier Leagues Victoria (6th Overall - Elimination Final)
- 2025 – National Premier Leagues Victoria (6th Overall - Runners Up)

== See also ==
- List of Croatian soccer clubs in Australia
- Australian-Croatian Soccer Tournament
- Croatian Australian
- Croatian Eagles
