= South Coast United SC =

South Coast United
- Full name: South Coast United Soccer Club
- Nicknames: Croatia, S.C.U, United
- Founded: 1984; 42 years ago as South Coast Croatia SC
- Ground: Sir Ian McLennan Park
- Capacity: 500 Seated, 5000 Standing
- Chairman: Vlado Skara
- League: Illawarra Premier League
- 2026: 9th of 12
Home colours	Away colours

South Coast United Soccer Club (formerly known as South Coast Croatia Soccer Club) is a semi-professional Australian soccer club from the city of Wollongong, New South Wales. The club was founded in 1984 by Wollongong's Croatian Australian community. The club plays in the Illawarra Premier League.

== History ==
Founded in 1984 by Croatian migrants as South Coast Croatia Soccer Club, the high point in the club's history came in 1987 when the club won its only Illawarra Premier League Championship.

South Coast Croatia were forced to change their name to South Coast United for the 1994 season a very unpopular move by Soccer Australia.

South Coast United were previously in the Illawarra Conference League, or Division 1 as it was previously known. In 2004, United were minor premiers of the Illawarra Conference League, and gained promotion to the Illawarra Premier League, but lost the Grand Final to Helensburgh 4–1.

South Coast United (known as Wollongong Croatia) is a regular participant of the Australian-Croatian Soccer Tournament although never having won the tournament in Division 1 the club has won Division 2 and Masters Titles with the most recent examples being 2011 at Edensor Park and 2014 at Ian McLennan Park, respectively.

The club hosted the Australian-Croatian Soccer Tournament in 1994 and 2014.

South Coast United formed a junior club under their name and were brought into the FSC junior football competition in 2016.

== Rivalries ==
=== Albion Park White Eagles ===
The club has a rivalry with the predominantly Serbian-backed Albion Park White Eagles (also known as Wollongong Serbia). While its origins were influenced in part by broader cultural and historical backgrounds, including events such as the Croatian War of Independence, it has since evolved into a largely symbolic sporting rivalry, with incidents between the two sides being very rare and inconsequential.

=== Cringila Lions ===
South Coast United/Croatia have always had a friendly rivalry with the Macedonian backed Cringila Lions FC as both clubs used to be powerhouses in the Illawarra Premier League. Over the years many players have swapped between the clubs including Zvonko Usljebrka and Brian & Tom Butkovic

== Supporters ==
The club has a predominantly Croatian Australian fan base as the club was founded by Croatian migrants.

== Achievements ==
Year	Division	Name/Achievement
1985	Second Division	Grand Final Champions
1985	Second Division	Renato Bettoncelli, Player of The Year
1985	Reserve Grade Second Division	Grand Final Champions
1986	First Division	Grand Final Champions
1986	Reserve Grade First Division	Grand Final Champions
1987	Premier Division	Premiers
1987	Premier Division	Grand Final Champions
1987	Premier Division	Neil Williams, Player of The Year
1987	Premier Division	Joe Coelho, Top Goalscorer
1987	NSW Ampol Cup	Champions
1988	Corrimal Leagues Club Knockout	Champions
1988	Charity Shield	Champions
1989	Premier Division	Premiers
1989	Premier Division Grand Final	Runners Up Lost to Wests/Figtree
1990	Corrimal Leagues Club Knockout	Champions
1990	Premier Division	Joe Coelho, Top Goalscorer
1990	Bert Bampton Cup	Runners up lost to Cringila United 3-2 aet
1990	Youth Cup	Champions
1991	Premier Division	Runners Up
1991	Premier Division	Joe Coelho, Top Goalscorer
1992	Second Division	Runners Up
1992	Second Division Grand Final	Runners up lost 0:0 (5:4 pens) to Tarrawanna
2004	District League	Premiers
2004	District League Grand Final	Runners up lost 4-1 to Helensburgh
2004	District League	Denis Jurjevic, Neville Arrowsmith Medal/Player of The Year
2004	District League	Denis Jurjevic, Top Goalscorer
2005	Premier League	Denis Jurjevic, Player of The Year
2006	Youth Cup	Champions
2008	Premier League	Michael Šantalab, Player of The Year
2008	Youth Grade	Julian Minutillo, Top Goalscorer
2011	Premier League	Greg Valic, Best and Fairest
2014	Fraternity Club Preseason Cup	Runners Up

== Home ground ==
South Coast United have played out of Ian McLennan Park since their inception in 1984. For a majority of the 2018 season, United played out of Dandaloo Oval due to the redevelopment of Ian McLennan Park which included the laying of a synthetic pitch. South Coast United now have the best facilities in the Illawarra region with the only synthetic field in the area.

== Notable former players ==
- Cho Byung-Kuk
- Mile Jedinak
- Brendon Santalab

== Divisional history ==
Year	Division	Points	Place
1984	Community League	N/A	Promoted
1985	Second Division	N/A	Grand Final Winners,Place Unknown
1986	First Division	N/A	Grand Final Winners,Place Unknown
1987	Premier Division	N/A	1st (Premiers), Grand Final Winners
1988	Premier Division	N/A	N/A
1989	Premier Division	47	1st (Premiers)
1990	Premier Division	46	3rd
1991	Premier Division	51	2nd (South Coast Croatia were demoted to Division Two)
1992	Second Division	45	2nd (Promoted)
1993	First Division	48	5th (South Coast Croatia become South Coast United for 1994)
1994	First Division	41	3rd (Promoted)
1995	Premier Division	22	12th
1996	Division 1 – IFA	31	5th
1997	Illawarra Conference League	40	8th
1998	Illawarra Conference League	N/A	N/A
1999	Illawarra Conference League	35	5th
2000	Illawarra Conference League	35	9th
2001	Illawarra Conference League	32	5th
2002	Illawarra Conference League	39	7th
2003	Illawarra Conference League	35	9th
2004	Illawarra Conference League	62	1st – Premiers and Promoted
2005	Illawarra Premier League	42	5th
2006	Illawarra Premier League	35	9th
2007	Illawarra Premier League	49	5th
2008	Illawarra Premier League	36	9th
2009	Illawarra Premier League	36	3rd
2010	Illawarra Premier League	21	11th
2011	Illawarra Premier League	29	7th
2012	Illawarra Premier League	20	10th
2013	Illawarra Premier League	17	10th
2014	Illawarra Premier League	36	5th
2015	Illawarra Premier League	26	8th
2016	Illawarra Premier League	20	10th
2017	Illawarra Premier League	18	9th
2018	Illawarra Premier League	18	10th
2019	Illawarra Premier League	21	10th
2020	Illawarra Premier League	4	12th - NO RELEGATION DUE TO COVID-19 PANDEMIC
2021	Illawarra Premier League	N/A	SEASON VOIDED DUE TO COVID-19 PANDEMIC
2022	Illawarra Premier League	16	9th
2023	Illawarra Premier League	20	10th
2024	Illawarra Premier League	20	9th
2025	Illawarra Premier League	17	11th

== See also ==
- List of Croatian soccer clubs in Australia
- Australian-Croatian Soccer Tournament
