= 2025 Australia Cup preliminary rounds =

Qualification rounds for 2025 season of Australian soccer competition

Tournament details
- Country: Australia

The 2025 Australia Cup preliminary rounds were the qualifying competition to decide teams to take part in the 2025 Australia Cup. The competition commenced in February and concluded in June. The play-offs for A-League teams were held at the conclusion of the 2024–25 A-League season in May.

== Schedule ==
The fixtures for the competition were as follows.

Round	Number of fixtures	Clubs	A-League	ACT	NSW	NNSW	NT	QLD	SA	TAS	VIC	WA
First round	53 + 45 byes	718 → 665	—	—	—	7 Mar	—	1 Feb	—	—	14–17 Feb	—
Second round	114 + 137 byes	665 → 551	—	—	6–16 Mar	15 Feb–25 Mar	—	8 Feb–1 Mar	—	—	28 Feb–3 Mar	22–23 Feb
Third round	204 + 11 byes	551 → 347	—	11–13 Mar	4–31 Mar	22 Feb–3 Apr	—	14 Feb–3 Apr	7–10 Mar	8 Mar	11–25 Mar	14–16 Mar
Fourth round	166	347 → 181	—	25 Mar–10 Apr	8–10 Apr	1 Mar–22 Apr	15 Mar–8 Apr	1–12 Apr	28–30 Mar	28–30 Mar	8–21 Apr	11–13 Apr
Fifth round	83 + 1 bye	181 → 97	—	29 Apr–8 May	22 Apr–1 May	15 Mar–13 May	1–22 Apr	22–30 Apr	17–21 Apr	18–21 Apr	29 Apr–14 May	2–3 May
Sixth round	42	97 → 55	—	20–21 May	6–13 May	7 Jun	29 Apr–3 May	17 May–21 May	13–21 May	17–18 May	20–27 May	27–28 May
A-League play-off round	2	55 → 53	13–14 May	—	—	—	—	—	—	—	—	—
Seventh round	21	53 → 32	—	7 Jun	28 May–4 Jun	11 Jun	20 May	14–18 Jun	11–18 Jun	9 Jun	10–17 Jun	17–18 Jun

== Format ==
The preliminary rounds structures were as follows, and refer to the different levels in the unofficial Australian soccer league system:

- First round:

- 2 Northern New South Wales clubs (south zone teams from level 6) entered at this stage.
- 9 Queensland clubs from Regional Queensland level 5 and below entered this stage.
- 131 Victorian clubs from level 7 and below entered this stage.

- Second round:

- 80 New South Wales clubs from the association clubs level (levels 5 and below) entered this stage.
- 38 Northern New South Wales clubs (10 north zone teams, and 28 south zone teams from levels 4 to 6) entered this stage.
- 87 Queensland clubs (8 from the previous round, 17 regional teams and 62 metro teams from level 5 and below) entered this stage.
- 128 Victorian clubs (80 from the previous round and 48 teams from levels 5 and 6) entered this stage.
- 20 Western Australian clubs from level 5 and below entered at this stage.

- Third round:

- 10 Australian Capital Territory clubs from level 3 and below entered this stage. The top three level 3 teams from 2024 entered in the following round.
- 102 New South Wales clubs (71 from the previous round and 31 teams from levels 3 and 4) entered this stage.
- 40 Northern New South Wales clubs (19 from the previous round, 16 north zone teams, 14 south zone teams from levels 4 and below and 10 teams from level 3) entered this stage.
- 80 Queensland clubs (69 from the previous round, and 11 teams from levels 4) entered this stage.
- 57 South Australian clubs entered this stage, which doubled as the first stage of the 2025 FSA Federation Cup.
- 10 Tasmanian clubs from level 3 and below entered this stage.
- 78 Victorian clubs (64 from the previous round and 14 teams from level 4) entered this stage.
- 42 Western Australian clubs (18 from the previous round and 24 teams from levels 3 and 4) entered this stage.

- Fourth round:

- 16 Australian Capital Territory clubs (5 from the previous round, 3 teams from level 3 and 8 teams from level 2) entered this stage.
- 64 New South Wales clubs (51 from the previous round and 13 teams from level 2) entered this stage.
- 32 Northern New South Wales clubs (20 from the previous round, 8 north zone teams, 12 south zone teams from level 3 and below and 12 teams from level 2) entered this stage.
- 12 Northern Territory clubs from level 2 and below entered this stage.
- 64 Queensland clubs (40 from the previous round, one team from the Central Coast area and 23 teams from levels 2 and 3) entered this stage.
- 32 South Australian clubs progressed to this stage.
- 16 Tasmanian clubs (7 from the previous round, 1 league winners from level 3, and 8 teams from level 2) entered this stage.
- 64 Victorian clubs (39 from the previous round and 25 teams from levels 3 and 4) entered this stage.
- 32 Western Australian clubs (21 from the previous round and 11 teams from level 2) entered this stage.

- Fifth round:

- 8 Australian Capital Territory clubs progressed to this stage.
- 32 New South Wales clubs progressed to this stage.
- 16 Northern New South Wales clubs progressed to this stage.
- 8 Northern Territory clubs (7 from the previous round and the winner of the 2024 NorZone Premier League) entered this stage.
- 32 Queensland clubs progressed to this stage.
- 32 Victorian clubs progressed to this stage.
- 16 South Australian clubs progressed to this stage.
- 8 Tasmanian clubs progressed to this stage.
- 16 Western Australian clubs progressed to this stage.

- Sixth round:

- 4 Australian Capital Territory clubs progressed to this stage.
- 16 New South Wales club progressed to this stage.
- 8 Northern New South Wales clubs progressed to this stage.
- 4 Northern Territory clubs progressed to this stage.
- 16 Queensland clubs progressed to this stage.
- 16 Victorian clubs progressed to this stage.
- 8 South Australian clubs progressed to this stage.
- 4 Tasmanian clubs progressed to this stage.
- 8 Western Australian clubs progressed to this stage.

- Seventh round:

- 2 Australian Capital Territory clubs progressed to this stage, which doubled as the Final of the Federation Cup.
- 8 New South Wales clubs progressed to this stage. The 4 winners also qualified for the final rounds of the Waratah Cup.
- 4 Northern New South Wales clubs progressed to this stage. The 2 winners also qualified for the Final of the NNSWF State Cup.
- 2 Northern Territory clubs progressed to this stage, which doubled as the Final of the NT Australia Cup.
- 8 Queensland clubs progressed to this stage; 1 from Regional Queensland, and 7 from South East Queensland. The 4 winners also qualified for the semi-finals of the Kappa Queensland Cup.
- 4 South Australian clubs progressed to this stage. The 2 winners also qualified for the final of the Federation Cup.
- 2 Tasmanian clubs progressed to this stage, which doubled as the Grand Final of the Milan Lakoseljac Cup.
- 8 Victorian clubs progressed to this stage. The 4 winners also qualified for the final rounds of the Dockerty Cup.
- 4 Western Australian clubs progressed to this stage. The 2 winners also qualified for the Final of the Football West State Cup.

- Play-off round:

- The four lowest-ranked teams in the 2024–25 A-League Men played-off for two spots in the Round of 32.

== Key to abbreviations ==
Federation	Zone
ACT = Australian Capital Territory	
NSW = New South Wales	
NNSW = Northern New South Wales	NTH = North; STH = South
NT = Northern Territory	ASP = Alice Springs; DAR = Darwin
QLD = Queensland	CC = Central Coast; FNG = Far North and Gulf; NTH = Northern; REG = Regional Queensland (general); WB = Wide Bay; WC = Whitsunday Coast
QLD = Queensland	SEQ = South East Queensland
SA = South Australia	
TAS = Tasmania	
VIC = Victoria	
WA = Western Australia	

== First round ==
Fed.	Zone	Tie no	Home team (Tier)	Score	Away team (Tier)
Northern New South Wales
NNSW	STH	1	Garden Suburb (6)	3–2	Merewether United (6)
Queensland
QLD	FNG	2	Redlynch Strikers United (5)	0–2†	Mareeba United (5)
Victoria
VIC	–	3	Brunswick Zebras (7)	5–1	Riversdale SC (8)
VIC	–	4	Moreland Eagles (9)	4–1	Gisborne FC (9)
VIC	–	5	Greater Dandenong (7)	1–0	East Kew (8)
VIC	–	6	Monash University (8)	8–0	Tarneit (9)
VIC	–	7	Newport Storm (9)	0–7	Altona North (7)
VIC	–	8	Boronia (9)	0–8	Surf Coast (7)
VIC	–	9	Somerville (8)	w/o	Maidstone (9)
VIC	–	10	Plenty Valley Lions (7)	3–0	FC Birrarung (9)
VIC	–	11	Sandringham (7)	4–0	Frankston Pines (8)
VIC	–	12	Alphington (9)	2–3	Barnstoneworth (8)
VIC	–	13	FC Eaglehawk (10)	w/o	Mount Martha (9)
VIC	–	14	Monash City Villareal (8)	2–1	Sale United (10)
VIC	–	15	Mount Waverley City (8)	1–2	Ringwood City (8)
VIC	–	16	Swinburne (11)	w/o	St. Kevin's Old Boys (9)
VIC	–	17	Deakin Ducks (8)	5–2	Epsom FC (10)
VIC	–	18	Templestowe Wolves (9)	3–1	Heatherton United (7)
VIC	–	19	Golden City (11)	0–5	Croydon City (7)
VIC	–	20	Maryborough (10)	1–7	Melbourne City (8)
VIC	–	21	Diamond Valley United (7)	1–4	Hoppers Crossing (7)
VIC	–	22	Bell Park (8)	2–1	Spring Hills (9)
VIC	–	23	Laverton (7)	3–2	Ashburton (7)
VIC	–	24	Baxter (8)	5–1	Colac Otway Rovers (12)
VIC	–	25	Moreland United (8)	w/o	Springvale City (8)
VIC	–	26	Old Melburnians (9)	0–1	Glenroy Lions (8)
VIC	–	27	Middle Park (7)	7–0	La Trobe University (Bendigo) (10)

Fed.	Zone	Tie no	Home team (Tier)	Score	Away team (Tier)
VIC	–	28	Keysborough (9)	w/o	Heidelberg Stars (8)
VIC	–	29	Ballarat North United (10)	w/o	Lyndale United (8)
VIC	–	30	FC Noble Hurricanes (8)	w/o	Ocean Grove (9)
VIC	–	31	Mount Eliza (9)	2–1	Casey Panthers (9)
VIC	–	32	Manningham Juventus (8)	4–1	Myrtleford Savoy (10)
VIC	–	33	Old Ivanhoe (9)	2–1	Truganina Hornets (9)
VIC	–	34	Moonee Valley Knights (8)	1–4	Waverley Wanderers (7)
VIC	–	35	White Star Dandenong (7)	3–1†	Doreen (9)
VIC	–	36	Bundoora United (7)	0–2	West Preston (8)
VIC	–	37	Endeavour United (8)	1–0	Fawkner SC (8)
VIC	–	38	Knox United (8)	2–1	Meadow Park (9)
VIC	–	39	Bacchus Marsh Scorpions (10)	0–1	Heidelberg Eagles (7)
VIC	–	40	ETA Buffalo (9)	w/o	Elwood City (7)
VIC	–	41	Moonee Ponds United (8)	3–1	Chelsea (8)
VIC	–	42	Dandenong South (7)	0–1†	Monbulk Rangers (8)
VIC	–	43	Point Cook (8)	3–0	West Point (8)
VIC	–	44	Warrnambool Rangers (10)	1–3†	Rosebud (8)
VIC	–	45	Balmoral (8)	5–1	Castlemaine Goldfields (12)
VIC	–	46	Sunbury United (7)	2–3	Hampton Park United Sparrows (7)
VIC	–	47	Seaford United (9)	1–2	Yarra Jets (8)
VIC	–	48	Lilydale Montrose (9)	1–2	Burwood City (9)
VIC	–	49	Bunyip District (9)	1–2†	Sebastopol Vikings (7)
VIC	–	50	Sandown Lions (8)	w/o	Brighton SC (9)
VIC	–	51	Epping City (7)	w/o	Roxburgh Park (9)
VIC	–	52	Melbourne University (8)	w/o	Barton United (9)
VIC	–	53	Keilor Wolves (8)	3–2	Rowville Eagles (7)

Notes:

- w/o = Walkover
- † = After Extra Time
- NNSW Byes: Barnsley United (6), Charlestown Junior (6), Fletcher (6) Greta Branxton (6), Kurri Kurri (6), Mayfield United Junior (6), Medowie (6), Nelson Bay (6), Southern Lakes United (6).
- QLD Byes: Atherton Eagles (6), Edge Hill United (5), Innisfail United (5), Leichhardt FC (5), Marlin Coast Rangers (5), Southside Comets (5), Stratford Dolphins (5).
- VIC Byes: Aspendale (9), Ballarat (9), Barwon (8), Bendigo City (9), Cleeland United (9), Darebin United (8), Docklands Athletic (8), East Bentleigh (9), Endeavour Hills Fire (9), Footscray United Rangers (9), Fortuna '60 (9), Glen Eira (13), Glen Waverley (9), Greenvale United (9), Keon Park (9), Kings Domain (8), Lara United (8), La Trobe University (9), Melton Phoenix (8), Mentone (8), Mitchell Rangers (9), Noble Park (9), Old Trinity Grammarians (9), Pakenham United (9), Thornbury Athletic (8), Watsonia Heights (8), Westside Strikers (8), Whitehorse United (9), Wyndham (9).

== Second round ==
Fed.	Zone	Tie no	Home team (Tier)	Score	Away team (Tier)
New South Wales
NSW	–	1	Cringila Lions (5)	9–1	Kemps Creek United (5)
NSW	–	2	Lokomotiv Cove (6)	2–8	Wollongong Olympic (5)
NSW	–	3	Milton Ulladulla (5)	3–1	Blacktown Workers (5)
NSW	–	4	Sans Souci (5)	3–2†	Castle Hill RSL Rockets (5)
NSW	–	5	Quakers Hill (5)	2–3	Fernhill FC (6)
NSW	–	6	Narellan Rangers (5)	8–3	Albion Park (7)
NSW	–	7	Gladesville Ravens (6)	4–2	Asquith FC (6)
NSW	–	8	Bonnet Bay (5)	1–0	Glenmore Park (5)
NSW	–	9	North Sydney United (6)	1–4	Bulli FC (5)
Northern NSW
NNSW	NTH	10	Northern Storm (4)	5–0	Coffs Coast Tigers (4)
NNSW	NTH	11	Urunga (4)	3–2	Oxley Vale Attunga (4)
NNSW	NTH	12	Port United (4)	0–3	Demon Knights (4)
NNSW	NTH	13	Moore Creek (4)	3–0	Coffs City United (4)
NNSW	NTH	14	Inverell (4)	w/o	Goonellabah (4)
NNSW	STH	15	Garden Suburb (6)	2–1	Stockton Sharks (4)
NNSW	STH	16	Kotara South Senior (4)	6–1	Kurri Kurri (6)
NNSW	STH	17	Fletcher (6)	2–4	South Maitland (5)
NNSW	STH	18	Mayfield United Junior (5)	2–1	Nelson Bay (5)
NNSW	STH	19	Newcastle Suns (4)	8–2	Southern Lakes United (6)
NNSW	STH	20	Croudace Bay United (5)	12–0	Merewether Advance Senior (5)
NNSW	STH	21	Warners Bay (4)	2–2	North United Wolves (5)
Warners Bay advance 5–4 on penalties
NNSW	STH	22	Greta Branxton (6)	2–2	University of Newcastle (4)
University of Newcastle advance 3–2 on penalties
NNSW	STH	23	New Lambton Juniors (5)	1–7	Newcastle Croatia (4)
NNSW	STH	24	Charlestown Junior (6)	0–2	Mayfield United Senior (4)
NNSW	STH	25	Medowie FC (6)	2–3	Minmi (5)
NNSW	STH	26	Westlakes Wildcats (4)	2–6	Barnsley United (6)
NNSW	STH	27	Bolwarra Lorn Junior (5)	1–2	Cardiff City (4)
NNSW	STH	28	Lambton Jaffas Junior (5)	1–4	Swansea (4)
Queensland
QLD	FNG	29	Leichhardt FC (5)	1–3	Edge Hill United (5)
QLD	FNG	30	Mareeba United (5)	2–3	Innisfail United (5)
QLD	FNG	31	Marlin Coast Rangers (5)	5–0	Stratford Dolphins (5)
QLD	FNG	32	Atherton Eagles (6)	0–9	Southside Comets (5)
QLD	NTH	33	Burdekin (5)	1–2	Estates (5)
QLD	NTH	34	MA Olympic (5)	5–0	Rebels (5)
QLD	NTH	35	Riverway JCU (5)	1–4	Townsville Warriors (5)
QLD	NTH	36	Saints Eagles Souths (5)	1–8	Brothers Townsville (5)
QLD	WB	37	United Warriors (5)	1–7	Across The Waves (5)
QLD	WC	38	Whitsunday United (5)	2–3	Magpies (5)
QLD	WC	39	Mackay Rangers (5)	0–4	City Brothers (5)
QLD	SEQ	40	Nambour Yandina United (5)	4–2	Redcliffe Dolphins (5)
QLD	SEQ	41	Legends (6)	4–1	Bribie Island (8)
QLD	SEQ	42	Park Ridge (8)	2–1	Slacks Creek (7)
QLD	SEQ	43	Bardon Latrobe (6)	6–1	North Brisbane (5)
QLD	SEQ	44	Beerwah Glasshouse United (5)	1–5	Jimboomba United (7)
QLD	SEQ	45	Springfield United (5)	3–5	Virginia United (5)
QLD	SEQ	46	ACU FC (8)	1–8	The Gap (6)
Victoria
VIC	–	47	Monbulk Rangers (8)	0–4	Bendigo City (9)
VIC	–	48	Epping City (7)	2–1	Westvale Olympic (5)
VIC	–	49	Elwood City (7)	3–4	Melbourne University (8)
VIC	–	50	South Springvale (5)	3–1	Keon Park (9)
VIC	–	51	Old Ivanhoe (9)	7–0	Footscray United Rangers (9)
VIC	–	52	Laverton (7)	1–0†	Sandringham (7)
VIC	–	53	Williamstown (6)	3–0	Knox United (8)
VIC	–	54	Thornbury Athletic (8)	0–8	Old Scotch (5)
VIC	–	55	Peninsula Strikers (6)	0–2	Banyule City (5)
VIC	–	56	Springvale City (8)	0–4	St Kilda Celts (6)
VIC	–	57	Albion Rovers (6)	w/o	Craigieburn City (6)

Fed.	Zone	Tie no	Home team (Tier)	Score	Away team (Tier)
VIC	–	58	Mentone (8)	1–9	Mazenod (5)
VIC	–	59	Casey Comets (5)	0–3	Corio (5)
VIC	–	60	Westside Strikers (8)	5–0	Mitchell Rangers (9)
VIC	–	61	Aspendale (9)	4–3	Melton Phoenix (8)
VIC	–	62	Noble Park (9)	w/o	Western Suburbs (5)
VIC	–	63	Glen Waverley (9)	0–4	Chisholm United (6)
VIC	–	64	Surf Coast (7)	1–0	Keilor Wolves (8)
VIC	–	65	Burwood City (9)	0–1	Skye United (6)
VIC	–	66	Sebastapol Vikings (7)	0–1	Darebin United (8)
VIC	–	67	Watsonia Heights (8)	2–1†	Geelong Rangers (6)
VIC	–	68	Monash City Villareal (8)	0–3	Hampton Park United Sparrows (7)
VIC	–	69	Glenroy Lions (8)	0–1†	Docklands Athletic (8)
VIC	–	70	Altona East Phoenix (6)	1–2	Hampton East Brighton (5)
VIC	–	71	Manningham Juventus (8)	4–1	East Bentleigh (9)
VIC	–	72	Templestowe Wolves (9)	2–1	Moonee Ponds United (8)
VIC	–	73	Whittlesea Ranges (6)	1–0	Upfield (5)
VIC	–	74	Mount Eliza (9)	0–5	Balmoral (8)
VIC	–	75	Pakenham United (9)	2–0	Old Trinity Grammarians (9)
VIC	–	76	Uni Hill Eagles (6)	8–0	La Trobe University (9)
VIC	–	77	Melbourne City (8)	0–5	Dallas City (6)
VIC	–	78	Keilor Park (5)	w/o	Baxter (8)
VIC	–	79	Altona North (7)	1–1†	Doveton SC (5)
Doveton advance 5–4 on penalties
VIC	–	80	Gippsland United (5)	w/o	Keysborough (9)
VIC	–	81	Deakin Ducks (8)	0–2	Croydon City (7)
VIC	–	82	FC Noble Hurricanes (8)	w/o	Waverley Wanderers (7)
VIC	–	83	Beaumaris (5)	3–2†	Heidelberg Eagles (7)
VIC	–	84	Bentleigh United Cobras (6)	w/o	Ballarat North United (10)
VIC	–	85	Greater Dandenong (7)	0–2	Ringwood City (8)
VIC	–	86	Whitehorse United (9)	0–1	Yarra Jets (8)
VIC	–	87	Brighton (9)	1–2	Kings Domain (8)
VIC	–	88	Western Eagles (6)	w/o	Wyndham (9)
VIC	–	89	White Star Dandenong (7)	0–6	Clifton Hill (5)
VIC	–	90	Somerville Eagles (8)	2–3	North Caulfield (6)
VIC	–	91	Lara United (8)	1–4†	Brimbank Stallions (5)
VIC	–	92	Cleeland United (9)	w/o	FC Strathmore (6)
VIC	–	93	Collingwood City (5)	1–2	Westgate Sindjelic (5)
VIC	–	94	Brandon Park (5)	4–2	Hoppers Crossing (7)
VIC	–	95	FC Eaglehawk (10)	0–2	Plenty Valley Lions (7)
VIC	–	96	Rosebud (8)	0–2	Mornington (5)
VIC	–	97	Knox City (6)	0–7	Lalor United Sloga (6)
VIC	–	98	Bayside Argonauts (5)	2–0†	Noble Park United (6)
VIC	–	99	Ballarat (9)	3–6	Barwon (8)
VIC	–	100	Yarraville Glory (5)	w/o	Endeavour Hills Fire (9)
VIC	–	101	Mooroolbark SC (6)	1–2†	Point Cook (8)
VIC	–	102	West Preston (8)	1–0	Monash University (8)
VIC	–	103	Doncaster Rovers (6)	10–0	Swinburne (11)
VIC	–	104	Ballarat City (5)	5–2†	Malvern City (5)
VIC	–	105	Bell Park (8)	4–0	Glen Eira (13)
VIC	–	106	Sydenham Park (5)	5–2	Endeavour United (8)
VIC	–	107	Barnstoneworth United (8)	0–2	Berwick City (6)
VIC	–	108	Moreland Eagles (9)	3–1	Greenvale United (9)
VIC	–	109	Brunswick Zebras (7)	1–4	Mill Park (6)
VIC	–	110	Middle Park (7)	2–3	Fortuna '60 (9)
Western Australia
WA	–	111	Stirling Panthers (6)	0–5	North Perth United (5)
WA	–	112	Northern City (7)	6–0	Baldivis SC (7)
WA	–	113	Spearwood Dalmatinac (8)	1–2	Ballajura AFC (6)
WA	–	114	Ellenbrook United (6)	w/o	Dalyellup Park Rangers (-)

Notes:

- w/o = Walkover
- † = After Extra Time
- NSW Byes: Arncliffe Aurora (5), Auburn FC (5), Banksia Tigers (5), Berowra FC (5), Caringbah Redbacks (5),Carlton Rovers (6), Carss Park (6), Coledale Waves (7), Colo FC (5), Connells Point Rovers (5), Coogee United (5), Coptic United (5), Corrimal Rangers (6), Doonside Hawks (5), Eastern Creek Pioneer (5), Eschol Park (5), Fairfield Bulls (5), Fairfield Eagles (6), Fairfield Patrician Brothers (5), Figtree FC (7), Forest Killarney (5), Gerringong Breakers (6), Glebe Gorillas (5), Gunners SC (5), Gymea United (5), Hazelbrook FC (5), Hills Spirit (10), Hurstville Glory (5), Kellyville Kolts (5), Lane Cove (5), Lilli Pilli (5), Lindfield FC (5), Liverpool Rangers (8), Liverpool Olympic (11), Macquarie Dragons (5), Macquarie United (5), Manly Vale (5), Marayong FC (5), Maroubra United (6), Mascot Kings (7), Moorebank Sports (5), Mount Annan Mustangs (5), Narrabeen FC (5), North Ryde (6), Oak Flats Kraken (7), Orange Waratah (5), Oran Park Rovers (5), Pagewood Botany (7), Parklea FC (6), Penrith FC (5), Phoenix FC (5), Randwick City (5), Roselea FC (6), Shellharbour FC (5), Springwood United (5), St Mary's Eagle Vale (5), Sydney CBD (6), Sylvania Heights (5), Tarrawanna Blueys (5), The Ponds (5) , Waverley Old Boys (5), Western Condors (5), Winston Hills (5), Wollongong United (5).
- NNSW Byes: Armidale City Westside (-), Boambee (-), Byron Bay (-), East Armidale United (-), Majos (-), North Companions (-), Port Saints (-), Pottsville Beach (-), Westlawn Tigers (-), Yamba (-).
- QLD Byes: AC Carina (5), Acacia Ridge (6), Annerley (6), Baringa (5), Bethania Rams (7), Brighton Bulldogs (7), Caloundra (5), Centenary Stormers (5), Coolum FC (-), Coomera (5), Doon Villa (5), Gatton Redbacks (-), Highfields (5), Kangaroo Point Rovers (7), Kawana (5), Kingscliff Wolves (5), Logan Metro (6), Logan Roos (-), Logan Village Falcons (7), Mackay Lions (5), Mackay Wanderers (5), Moggill (6), Mooroondu (8), Mt Gravatt Hawks (5), Mudgeeraba (6), Musgrave (5), Narangba Eagles (6), New Farm United (6), Newmarket (5), Noosa Lions (5), Old Bridge Salisbury (7), Ormeau (5), Oxley United (7), Pacific Pines (6), Pimpana City (6), Ripley Valley (6), Rockville Rovers (5), Runaway Bay (5), Southport Warriors (5), Surfers Paradise Apollo (5), Tarragindi Tigers (7), Tweed United (5), UQFC (5), Western Spirit (5), Westside Grovely (7), West Wanderers (5), Willowburn (5), Woombye Snakes (5), Yeronga Eagles (5).
- WA Byes: Bunbury Dynamos (-), Cracovia SC (6), Football Margaret River (-), Joondanna Blues (7), Kwinana United (6), Maccabi (5), Morley Windmills (5), North Beach (5), Peel United (5), Perth AFC (6), Port Kennedy (6), Queens Park (7), South Perth United (5), Woodvale FC (8).

== Third round ==
Fed.	Zone	Tie no	Home team (Tier)	Score	Away team (Tier)
Australian Capital Territory
ACT	–	1	West Canberra Wanderers (3)	3–3†	Weston-Molonglo FC (-)
West Canberra advance 5–4 on penalties
ACT	–	2	Canberra Juventus (3)	5–0	Narrabundah (-)
ACT	–	3	Woden Valley (-)	1–2†	Majura FC (-)
ACT	–	4	Yarabi FC (-)	0–6	Brindabella Blues (3)
ACT	–	5	White Eagles (3)	7–0	Burns FC (-)
New South Wales
NSW	–	6	Bulli FC (5)	5–2	Colo FC (5)
NSW	–	7	Gladesville Ravens (6)	2–3	Gymea United (5)
NSW	–	8	Northern Tigers (3)	2–0	Forest Killarney (5)
NSW	–	9	Arncliffe Aurora (5)	5–1	Lane Cove (5)
NSW	–	10	Sydney CBD (6)	1–0	Hurstville Zagreb (4)
NSW	–	11	Springwood United (5)	2–3†	Banksia Tigers (5)
NSW	–	12	Marayong FC (5)	2–1	Central Coast United (4)
NSW	–	13	Fairfield Eagles (6)	0–4	Blacktown Spartans (3)
NSW	–	14	Bankstown United (4)	3–2	Lilli Pilli (5)
NSW	–	15	Bonnet Bay (5)	5–0	Macquarie United (5)
NSW	–	16	Hazelbrook FC (5)	0–3	Eastern Creek Pioneer (5)
NSW	–	17	Nepean FC (4)	2–1	Fraser Park (4)
NSW	–	18	Canterbury Bankstown (3)	w/o	Oak Flats Kraken (7)
NSW	–	19	Inner West Hawks (4)	2–2†	Macarthur Rams (3)
Macarthur Rams advance 3–2 on penalties
NSW	–	20	Granville Rage (4)	3–2†	Macquarie Dragons (5)
NSW	–	21	Randwick City (5)	6–2	Maroubra United (6)
NSW	–	22	Wollongong United (5)	9–0	Fernhill FC (6)
NSW	–	23	Tarrawanna Blueys (5)	2–1†	Mounties Wanderers (3)
NSW	–	24	Hawkesbury City (4)	1–1†	Caringbah Redbacks (5)
Caringbah Redbacks advance 5–3 on penalties
NSW	–	25	Dulwich Hill (3)	2–3	Hills United (3)
NSW	–	26	Camden Tigers (4)	2–6	Glebe Gorillas (5)
NSW	–	27	Kellyville Kolts (5)	3–4	Wollongong Olympic (5)
NSW	–	28	Orange Waratah (5)	1–6	Parramatta FC (4)
NSW	–	29	South Coast Flame (4)	6–0	St Mary's Eagle Vale (5)
NSW	–	30	Figtree FC (7)	1–5	Oran Park Rovers (5)
NSW	–	31	Sydney University (4)	3–1†	Dunbar Rovers (4)
NSW	–	32	Auburn FC (5)	3–4	Shellharbour FC (5)
NSW	–	33	Hurstville Glory (5)	9–0	Liverpool Rangers (8)
NSW	–	34	Coogee United (5)	5–0	Winston Hills (5)
NSW	–	35	Liverpool Olympic (11)	0–8	Bonnyrigg White Eagles (3)
NSW	–	36	SD Raiders (3)	11–0	Parklea FC (6)
NSW	–	37	Prospect United (4)	4–0	Sans Souci (5)
NSW	–	38	Western Condors (5)	4–2	North Ryde (6)
NSW	–	39	Fairfield Patrician Brothers (5)	3–0	Mount Annan Mustangs (5)
NSW	–	40	Coptic United (5)	1–7	Inter Lions (3)
NSW	–	41	Narrabeen FC (5)	8–0	Hills Spirit (10)
NSW	–	42	Bankstown City (3)	2–0	Rydalmere Lions (3)
NSW	–	43	Pagewood Botany (7)	8–2	Carss Park (6)
NSW	–	44	Lindfield FC (5)	11–0	Roselea FC (6)
NSW	–	45	Cringila Lions (5)	9–0	Moorebank Sports (5)
NSW	–	46	Berowra FC (5)	0–2	UNSW (3)
NSW	–	47	Gerringong Breakers (6)	1–3	Milton Ulladulla (5)
NSW	–	48	Penrith FC (5)	2–1	Coledale Waves (7)
NSW	–	49	Fairfield Bulls (5)	0–3	Gladesville Ryde Magic (4)
NSW	–	50	Corrimal Rangers (6)	0–5	Narellan Rangers (5)
NSW	–	51	Carlton Rovers (6)	2–4	Waverley Old Boys (5)
NSW	–	52	Eschol Park (5)	2–8	Phoenix FC (5)
NSW	–	53	Manly Vale (5)	4–1	Mascot Kings (7)
NSW	–	54	Doonside Hawks (5)	0–2	Gunners SC (5)
NSW	–	55	Connells Point Rovers (5)	0–3	Maccabi Hakoah Sydney City East (3)
NSW	–	56	The Ponds (5)	2–1	Sylvania Heights (5)
Northern NSW
NNSW	NTH	57	Demon Knights (-)	1–0	Pottsville Beach (-)
NNSW	NTH	58	Northern Storm (-)	1–1†	Inverell (-)
Northern Storm advance 3–1 on penalties
NNSW	NTH	59	Urunga (-)	2–2†	Armidale City Westside (-)
Armidale City Westside advance 19–18 on penalties
NNSW	NTH	60	Majos (-)	0–3	Boambee (-)
NNSW	NTH	61	Port Saints (-)	2–1	North Companions (-)
NNSW	NTH	62	Yamba (-)	1–7	Byron Bay (-)
NNSW	NTH	63	Westlawn Tigers (-)	2–0	East Armidale United (-)
NNSW	NTH	64	Bangalow (-)	7–0	Moore Creek (-)
NNSW	STH	65	Toronto Awaba Stags (3)	3–1	University of Newcastle (4)
NNSW	STH	66	Cardiff City (4)	4–2	Dudley Redhead United (3)
NNSW	STH	67	Swansea (4)	2–6	Kahibah (3)
NNSW	STH	68	Garden Suburb (6)	1–3	West Wallsend (3)
NNSW	STH	69	Warners Bay (4)	2–2†	Minmi (5)
Minmi advance 4–3 on penalties
NNSW	STH	70	Newcastle Croatia (4)	w/o	Barnsley United (6)
NNSW	STH	71	Singleton Strikers (3)	0–4	Croudace Bay United (5)
NNSW	STH	72	Kotara South Senior (4)	5–1	Cessnock City Hornets (3)
NNSW	STH	73	South Cardiff (3)	4–0	Thornton Redbacks (3)
NNSW	STH	74	Mayfield United Junior (5)	0–9	Mayfield United Senior (4)
NNSW	STH	75	Newcastle Suns (4)	5–0	Lake Macquarie City (3)
NNSW	STH	76	South Maitland (5)	1–4	Wallsend (3)
Queensland
QLD	FNG	77	Marlin Coast Rangers (5)	5–1	Edge Hill United (5)
QLD	FNG	78	Southside Comets (5)	5–1	Innisfail United (5)
QLD	NTH	79	MA Olympic (5)	3–0	Townsville Warriors (5)
QLD	NTH	80	Estates (5)	2–3†	Brothers Townsville (5)
QLD	WB	81	Doon Villa (5)	0–1	Across The Waves (5)
QLD	WC	82	Mackay Wanderers (5)	2–4†	Magpies (5)
QLD	WC	83	Mackay Lions (5)	1–0	City Brothers (5)
QLD	SEQ	84	Samford Rangers (4)	9–1	Logan Village Falcons (7)
QLD	SEQ	85	Taringa Rovers (4)	2–1	Mudgeeraba (6)
QLD	SEQ	86	Pine Hills (4)	5–2	Western Spirit (5)
QLD	SEQ	87	Centenary Stormers (5)	6–0	Rockville Rovers (5)
QLD	SEQ	88	Gatton Redbacks (-)	1–2	Tarragindi Tigers (7)
QLD	SEQ	89	Westside Grovely (7)	0–3	Ripley Valley (6)
QLD	SEQ	90	Yeronga Eagles (5)	3–2†	Musgrave (5)
QLD	SEQ	91	Highfields (5)	0–6	Moggill (6)
QLD	SEQ	92	Brighton Bulldogs (7)	3–8	Noosa Lions (5)
QLD	SEQ	93	Runaway Bay (5)	2–3	Mt Gravatt Hawks (5)
QLD	SEQ	94	Grange Thistle (4)	1–5	Robina City (4)
QLD	SEQ	95	AC Carina (5)	0–5	Old Bridge Salisbury (7)
QLD	SEQ	96	North Lakes United (4)	5–1	Jimboomba United (7)
QLD	SEQ	97	Baringa FC (5)	4–3	Annerley FC (6)
QLD	SEQ	98	The Gap (6)	w/o	West Wanderers (5)
QLD	SEQ	99	Logan Metro (6)	5–1	Southport Warriors (5)
QLD	SEQ	100	Coolum FC (-)	1–5	Kawana (5)
QLD	SEQ	101	Mooroondu (8)	6–2	Oxley United (8)
QLD	SEQ	102	Virginia United (5)	1–3	Coomera (5)
QLD	SEQ	103	Pacific Pines (6)	4–0	Pimpana City (6)
QLD	SEQ	104	Brisbane Knights (4)	4–2	Tweed United (5)
QLD	SEQ	105	Logan Roos (6)	2–0	Surfers Paradise Apollo (5)
QLD	SEQ	106	Legends (6)	3–0	Nerang SC (-)
QLD	SEQ	107	New Farm United (6)	5–1†	Bardon Latrobe (6)
QLD	SEQ	108	Souths United (4)	1–0	Woombye Snakes (5)

Fed.	Zone	Tie no	Home team (Tier)	Score	Away team (Tier)
QLD	SEQ	109	Acacia Ridge (6)	3–1	Bethania Rams (7)
QLD	SEQ	110	Nambour Yandina United (5)	0–4	Newmarket (5)
QLD	SEQ	111	UQFC (5)	3–0	Willowburn (5)
QLD	SEQ	112	Mitchelton FC (4)	7–1	Park Ridge (8)
QLD	SEQ	113	Warwick Wolves (-)	1–11	Narangba Eagles (6)
QLD	SEQ	114	Kingscliff Wolves (5)	2–3	Maroochydore FC (4)
QLD	SEQ	115	Ormeau (5)	0–0†	Caloundra (5)
Caloundra advance 8–7 on penalties
QLD	SEQ	116	Kangaroo Point Rovers (7)	0–5	North Star (4)
South Australia
SA	–	117	Portland Panthers (5)	0–13	Croydon Cougars (-)
SA	–	118	Pontian Eagles (3)	3–1	BOSA FC (-)
SA	–	119	Noarlunga United (4)	2–4	Salisbury Inter (4)
SA	–	120	Sturt Lions (3)	6–1	Angle Vale (-)
SA	–	121	Western Strikers (4)	1–2†	Gawler Eagles (4)
SA	–	122	Gambier Centrals (5)	1–5	Adelaide Olympic (3)
SA	–	123	Southern Knights (-)	w/o	West Adelaide (3)
SA	–	124	International SC (5)	0–2	Adelaide Titans (4)
SA	–	125	Tea Tree Gully City (-)	w/o	Adelaide Eagles (-)
SA	–	126	Apollo FC (5)	0–15	Adelaide Croatia Raiders (2)
SA	–	127	Cumberland United (3)	3–0	Old Ignatians (-)
SA	–	128	Elizabeth Downs (-)	2–5	Seaford Rangers (4)
SA	–	129	Adelaide Hills Hawks (4)	1–0	Para Hills West (-)
SA	–	130	Adelaide Cobras (3)	0–1	Modbury Jets (2)
SA	–	131	Vipers FC (3)	3–2	Eastern United (4)
SA	–	132	Fulham United (3)	3–1	Port Adelaide (4)
SA	–	133	Adelaide Brasfoot (-)	4–5†	Elizabeth Grove (4)
SA	–	134	Ghan United (4)	2–1	Northern Demons (4)
SA	–	135	Adelaide Comets (2)	4–0	Modbury Vista (4)
SA	–	136	Naracoorte United (5)	0–16	The Cove (3)
SA	–	137	Para Hills East (-)	5–0	South Adelaide Panthers (3)
SA	–	138	Para Hills United (-)	1–4	Adelaide University (4)
SA	–	139	Salisbury United (3)	1–2	Playford City (2)
SA	–	140	Pitbulls FC (-)	1–3	Adelaide Blue Eagles (3)
SA	–	141	Mount Barker United (4)	3–6	Adelaide Atletico (4)
Tasmania
TAS	–	142	New Town White Eagles (3)	6–1	Somerset Sharks (3)
TAS	–	143	Hobart United (3)	0–2	Taroona (3)
TAS	–	144	Burnie United (3)	0–6	Olympia FC Warriors (3)
Victoria
VIC	–	145	Keilor Park (5)	1–0	Western Suburbs (5)
VIC	–	146	Chisholm United (6)	1–0	Fortuna '60 (9)
VIC	–	147	Mill Park (6)	1–0	Essendon Royals (4)
VIC	–	148	Pascoe Vale (4)	5–0	Templestowe Wolves (9)
VIC	–	149	Docklands Athletic (8)	0–4	Nunawading City (4)
VIC	–	150	St Kilda Celts (6)	2–1	South Springvale (5)
VIC	–	151	North Geelong Warriors (4)	w/o	Berwick City (6)
VIC	–	152	Mornington (5)	4–2	Darebin United (8)
VIC	–	153	North Caulfield (6)	0–3	Ballarat City (5)
VIC	–	154	Gippsland United (5)	2–6	Westgate Sindjelic (5)
VIC	–	155	Bentleigh United Cobras (6)	0–1	Altona City (4)
VIC	–	156	West Preston (8)	4–2	Hampton Park United Sparrows (7)
VIC	–	157	Banyule City (5)	2–0	Manningham Juventus (8)
VIC	–	158	Mazenod (5)	1–3	Ringwood City (8)
VIC	–	159	Clifton Hill (5)	2–0	Bell Park (8)
VIC	–	160	Bendigo City (9)	1–5	Whittlesea United (4)
VIC	–	161	Doncaster Rovers (6)	2–4	Bayside Argonauts (5)
VIC	–	162	Epping City (7)	2–0	Plenty Valley Lions (7)
VIC	–	163	Uni Hill Eagles (6)	0–1†	Beaumaris (5)
VIC	–	164	Melbourne University (8)	2–3†	Croydon City (7)
VIC	–	165	Barwon (8)	0–5	Dallas City (6)
VIC	–	166	Waverley Wanderers (7)	0–2	Sydenham Park (5)
VIC	–	167	Doveton SC (5)	1–3	Hampton East Brighton (5)
VIC	–	168	Old Ivanhoe (9)	4–4†	Aspendale (9)
Old Ivanhoe advance 4–1 on penalties
VIC	–	169	Surf Coast (7)	4–1	Kings Domain (8)
VIC	–	170	Western Eagles (6)	6–1	Yarra Jets (8)
VIC	–	171	Old Scotch (5)	1–0	Westside Strikers (8)
VIC	–	172	Albion Rovers (6)	2–1	Williamstown (6)
VIC	–	173	Moreland Eagles (9)	3–0	Pakenham United (9)
VIC	–	174	FC Strathmore (6)	3–1	Brandon Park (5)
VIC	–	175	Balmoral (8)	1–0	Laverton (7)
VIC	–	176	Yarraville Glory (5)	0–8	Springvale White Eagles (4)
VIC	–	177	Werribee City (4)	7–0	Watsonia Heights (8)
VIC	–	178	Box Hill United (4)	4–3	Brimbank Stallions (5)
VIC	–	179	Corio (5)	2–1	Brunswick Juventus (4)
VIC	–	180	Point Cook (8)	0–4	Whittlesea Ranges (6)
VIC	–	181	Lalor United Sloga (6)	5–1	Skye United (6)
VIC	–	182	Boroondara-Carey Eagles (4)	0–3	Goulburn Valley Suns (4)
VIC	–	183	Eltham Redbacks (4)	2–0	Geelong SC (4)
Western Australia
WA	–	184	Forrestfield United (4)	4–3†	Kwinana United (6)
WA	–	185	Bunbury Dynamos (-)	2–4	Inglewood United (3)
WA	–	186	Joondanna Blues (7)	0–6	Perth AFC (6)
WA	–	187	East Perth (4)	3–0	Morley Windmills (5)
WA	–	188	Swan United (4)	0–3	Subiaco AFC (3)
WA	–	189	Dianella White Eagles (3)	2–2†	Canning City (4)
Canning City advance 8–7 on penalties
WA	–	190	Carramar Shamrock Rovers (4)	1–2	Kalamunda City (3)
WA	–	191	Cockburn City (4)	1–4	Wembley Downs (4)
WA	–	192	North Beach (5)	0–7	UWA-Nedlands FC (3)
WA	–	193	Gwelup Croatia (3)	2–3	Joondalup City (3)
Joondalup City removed from competition for fielding an ineligible player.
WA	–	194	Queens Park (7)	2–6	Murdoch University Melville (3)
WA	–	195	Port Kennedy (6)	4–1	Peel United (5)
WA	–	196	North Perth United (5)	4–3	Cracovia SC (6)
WA	–	197	Football Margaret River (-)	2–0	Ballajura AFC (6)
WA	–	198	Rockingham City (4)	3–3†	Wanneroo City (4)
Wanneroo City advance 5–4 on penalties
WA	–	199	Gosnells City (3)	10–0	Northern City (7)
WA	–	200	Balga SC (4)	2–0	Maccabi (5)
WA	–	201	Ellenbrook United (6)	1–0	South Perth United (5)
Ellenbrook United removed from competition for fielding an ineligible player.
WA	–	202	Woodvale FC (8)	w/o	Quinns FC (4)
WA	–	203	Curtin University (3)	2–1	Mandurah City (3)
WA	–	204	Ashfield SC (4)	1–4	Kingsley Westside (3)

Notes:

- w/o = Walkover
- † = After Extra Time
- SA byes: Adelaide City (2), FK Beograd (2), Campbelltown City (2), Croydon FC (2), North Eastern MetroStars (2), Para Hills Knights (2), West Torrens Birkalla (2).
- TAS byes: Barnstoneworth United (4), Hobart City (3), Metro (3), University of Tasmania (3).

== Fourth round ==
Fed.	Zone	Tie no	Home team (Tier)	Score	Away team (Tier)
Australian Capital Territory
ACT	–	1	Canberra Juventus (3)	0–3	Yoogali SC (2)
ACT	–	2	Canberra Croatia (2)	4–0	ANU FC (3)
ACT	–	3	O'Connor Knights (2)	2–5	Gungahlin United (2)
ACT	–	4	Canberra White Eagles (3)	0–1	Brindabella Blues (3)
ACT	–	5	Tuggeranong United (2)	3–0	Canberra Olympic (3)
ACT	–	6	Belconnen United (3)	2–3	Queanbeyan City (2)
ACT	–	7	Tigers FC (2)	5–0	Majura FC (-)
ACT	–	8	West Canberra Wanderers (3)	0–7	Monaro Panthers (2)
New South Wales
NSW	–	9	Hurstville Glory (-)	0–5	Prospect United (4)
NSW	–	10	Sydney CBD (-)	0–3	SD Raiders (3)
NSW	–	11	Maccabi Hakoah Sydney City East (3)	2–4†	Parramatta FC (4)
NSW	–	12	Fairfield Patrician Brothers (-)	1–3†	Bankstown United (4)
NSW	–	13	Nepean FC (4)	0–10	APIA Leichhardt (2)
NSW	–	14	Sydney Olympic (2)	5–2	St George FC (2)
NSW	–	15	Randwick City (-)	0–5	Wollongong Wolves (2)
NSW	–	16	Wollongong Olympic (-)	4–2†	Sydney University (4)
NSW	–	17	Canterbury Bankstown (3)	1–3†	NWS Spirit (2)
NSW	–	18	Glebe Gorillas (-)	1–4	Sydney United (2)
NSW	–	19	Bankstown City (3)	1–2	Marconi Stallions (2)
NSW	–	20	The Ponds (-)	0–1†	Bulli FC (-)
NSW	–	21	Macarthur Rams (3)	3–1	South Coast Flame (4)
NSW	–	22	Gunners SC (-)	7–2	Pagewood Botany (-)
NSW	–	23	Manly Vale (-)	1–2	Blacktown Spartans (3)
NSW	–	24	Coogee United (-)	2–1	Narrabeen FC (-)
NSW	–	25	Manly United (2)	11–0	Milton Ulladulla (-)
NSW	–	26	Arncliffe Aurora (-)	2–1	Mount Druitt Town Rangers (2)
NSW	–	27	Inter Lions (3)	0–2	Sutherland Sharks (2)
NSW	–	28	Western Condors (-)	0–5	Gladesville Ryde Magic (4)
NSW	–	29	Gymea United (-)	3–1	Penrith FC (-)
NSW	–	30	Bonnyrigg White Eagles (3)	2–2†	FC Shellharbour (-)
Shellharbour advance 5–3 on penalties
NSW	–	31	St George City (2)	0–2	Rockdale Ilinden (2)
NSW	–	32	Caringbah Redbacks (-)	1–4	Narellan Rangers (-)
NSW	–	33	Marayong FC (-)	1–2†	Wollongong United
NSW	–	34	Eastern Creek Pioneers (-)	3–1	Oran Park Rovers (-)
NSW	–	35	Tarrawanna Blueys (-)	5–0	Waverley Old Boys (-)
NSW	–	36	Blacktown City (2)	3–0	UNSW (3)
NSW	–	37	Northern Tigers (3)	4–0	Lindfield FC (-)
NSW	–	38	Cringila Lions (-)	4–1	Bonnet Bay (-)
NSW	–	39	Phoenix FC (-)	1–4	Granville Rage (4)
NSW	–	40	Hills United (3)	1–0	Banksia Tigers (-)
Northern NSW
NNSW	NTH	41	Bangalow (-)	4–2	Boambee (-)
NNSW	NTH	42	Demon Knights (-)	1–2†	Westlawn Tigers (-)
NNSW	NTH	43	Northern Storm (-)	w/o	Byron Bay (-)
NNSW	NTH	44	Port Saints (-)	3–2†	Armidale City Westside (-)
NNSW	STH	45	Broadmeadow Magic (2)	4–2	Kahibah FC (3)
NNSW	STH	46	Mayfield United Senior (4)	0–4	Charlestown Azzurri (2)
NNSW	STH	47	Lambton Jaffas (2)	2–0	South Cardiff (3)
NNSW	STH	48	Cardiff City (4)	0–3	Edgeworth Eagles (2)
NNSW	STH	49	Wallsend FC (3)	6–1	Minmi (5)
NNSW	STH	50	New Lambton (2)	1–3†	Croudace Bay United (5)
NNSW	STH	51	Maitland FC (2)	5–2	Newcastle Croatia (4)
NNSW	STH	52	Toronto Awaba Stags (3)	4–2	Belmont Swansea United (2)
NNSW	STH	53	Adamstown Rosebud (2)	4–0	West Wallsend (3)
NNSW	STH	54	Kotara South Senior (4)	1–2	Newcastle Olympic (2)
NNSW	STH	55	Weston Bears (2)	3–2	Newcastle Suns (4)
NNSW	STH	56	Valentine FC (2)	0–5	Cooks Hill United (2)
Northern Territory
NT	ASP	57	Verdi (2)	4–1	Vikings (2)
NT	ASP	58	Alice Springs Celtic (2)	0–7	Stormbirds (2)
NT	DAR	59	Hellenic Athletic (2)	5–2	Palmerston Rovers (3)
NT	DAR	60	Garuda (2)	0–1	Darwin Olympic (2)
NT	DAR	61	Azzurri United (2)	2–3†	Port Darwin (2)
NT	DAR	62	Casuarina FC (2)	0–8	Darwin Hearts (2)
Queensland
QLD	WB v CC	63	Across The Waves (5)	4–1†	Frenchville (5)
QLD	WC	64	Mackay Lions (5)	2–1	Magpies (5)
QLD	NTH	65	Brothers Townsville (5)	1–3	MA Olympic (5)
QLD	FNG	66	Southside Comets (5)	0–6	Marlin Coast Rangers (5)
QLD	SEQ	67	Legends (6)	2–4	Mt Gravatt Hawks (5)
QLD	SEQ	68	Souths United (4)	2–3	Old Bridge Salisbury (7)
QLD	SEQ	69	Robina City (4)	2–2†	Lions FC (2)
Lions FC advance 5–4 on penalties
QLD	SEQ	70	Ripley Valley (6)	6–4	The Gap (6)
QLD	SEQ	71	Samford Rangers (4)	0–1	Redlands United (3)
QLD	SEQ	72	Acacia Ridge (6)	0–3	Yeronga Eagles (5)
QLD	SEQ	73	Brisbane Strikers (3)	9–0	Pacific Pines (6)
QLD	SEQ	74	Brisbane Knights (4)	4–1	Baringa FC
QLD	SEQ	75	Mitchelton FC (4)	2–0	Kawana F.C. (5)
QLD	SEQ	76	Centenary Stormers (5)	2–3	Coomera (5)
QLD	SEQ	77	Narangba Eagles (6)	0–11	Olympic FC (2)
QLD	SEQ	78	Rochedale Rovers (3)	6–1	Pine Hills (4)
QLD	SEQ	79	Caboolture Sports (3)	2–4	Broadbeach United (3)
QLD	SEQ	80	Southside Eagles (3)	9–1	Mooroondu (8)
QLD	SEQ	81	Newmarket SFC (5)	1–0	Sunshine Coast Wanderers (2)
QLD	SEQ	82	Wynnum Wolves (2)	2–0	Maroochydore FC (4)
QLD	SEQ	83	Eastern Suburbs (2)	8–0	Noosa Lions (5)
QLD	SEQ	84	North Lakes United (4)	0–3	Magic United (3)
QLD	SEQ	85	Moggill (6)	3–3†	UQFC (5)
Moggill advance 6–5 on penalties

Fed.	Zone	Tie no	Home team (Tier)	Score	Away team (Tier)
QLD	SEQ	86	St George Willawong (2)	14–0	Tarragindi Tigers (7)
QLD	SEQ	87	Logan Roos (6)	2–1	New Farm United (6)
QLD	SEQ	88	Ipswich FC (3)	0–2	Brisbane City (2)
QLD	SEQ	89	Moreton City Excelsior (2)	5–1	Caloundra (5)
QLD	SEQ	90	Holland Park Hawks (3)	1–2	Gold Coast Knights (2)
QLD	SEQ	91	North Star (4)	0–4	Logan Lightning (3)
QLD	SEQ	92	Taringa Rovers (4)	4–2	SWQ Thunder (3)
QLD	SEQ	93	Logan Metro (6)	1–4	Peninsula Power (2)
QLD	SEQ	94	Gold Coast United (2)	3–0	Capalaba FC (3)
South Australia
SA	–	85	Gawler Eagles (4)	1–2	North Eastern MetroStars (2)
SA	–	96	Adelaide Comets (2)	3–1	Para Hills East (-)
SA	–	97	Adelaide Croatia Raiders (2)	6–0	Elizabeth Grove (4)
SA	–	98	Adelaide University (4)	1–2	Adelaide Olympic (3)
SA	–	99	Croydon FC (2)	2–1	Salisbury Inter (4)
SA	–	100	Seaford Rangers (4)	2–2†	Pontian Eagles (3)
Seaford Rangers advance 3–1 on penalties
SA	–	101	Croydon Cougars (-)	0–5	Ghan United (4)
SA	–	102	Vipers FC (3)	0–3	Cumberland United (3)
SA	–	103	Adelaide Titans (4)	1–5	Fulham United (3)
SA	–	104	Sturt Lions (3)	4–1	Tea Tree Gully City (-)
SA	–	105	West Torrens Birkalla (2)	1–1†	Adelaide City (2)
West Torrens Birkalla advance 5–4 on penalties
SA	–	106	Adelaide Hills Hawks (4)	2–1	West Adelaide (3)
SA	–	107	Modbury Jets (2)	2–1	Para Hills Knights (2)
SA	–	108	The Cove (3)	2–0	Adelaide Atletico VSC (4)
SA	–	109	Campbelltown City (2)	2–0	Playford City (2)
SA	–	110	FK Beograd (2)	4–0	Adelaide Blue Eagles (3)
Tasmania
TAS	–	111	South Hobart (2)	3–0	Barnstoneworth United (4)
TAS	–	112	Launceston United (2)	1–7	Kingborough Lions United (2)
TAS	–	113	Glenorchy Knights (2)	4–5	Devonport City Strikers (2)
TAS	–	114	University of Tasmania (3)	1–6	Launceston City (2)
TAS	–	115	South East United (3)	5–2	Hobart City (3)
TAS	–	116	Riverside Olympic (2)	3–0	Olympia FC Warriors (3)
TAS	–	117	Metro (3)	0–3	Clarence Zebras (2)
TAS	–	118	New Town White Eagles (3)	6–1	Taroona (3)
Victoria
VIC	–	119	Chisholm United (6)	2–1†	Surf Coast (7)
VIC	–	120	Northcote City (3)	4–3	Kingston City (3)
VIC	–	121	Balmoral (8)	4–2	North Geelong Warriors (4)
VIC	–	122	Whittlesea Ranges (6)	5–1	Lalor United Sloga (6)
VIC	–	123	Banyule City (5)	2–1	Old Scotch (5)
VIC	–	124	Brunswick City (3)	2–0	Epping City (7)
VIC	–	125	St Albans Dinamo (2)	0–2	Heidelberg United (2)
VIC	–	126	Sydenham Park (5)	0–1	Dandenong City (2)
VIC	–	127	Whittlesea United (4)	3–1	West Preston (8)
VIC	–	128	Moreland City (3)	0–4	Bulleen Lions (3)
VIC	–	129	Nunawading City (4)	2–0	St Kilda Celts (6)
VIC	–	130	Moreland Eagles (9)	0–7	Melbourne Srbija (3)
VIC	–	131	Springvale White Eagles (4)	2–3†	Altona City (4)
VIC	–	132	Eltham Redbacks (4)	1–3	Hume City (2)
VIC	–	133	Ringwood City (8)	0–3	Oakleigh Cannons (2)
VIC	–	134	Langwarrin SC (3)	2–1	Mornington (5)
VIC	–	135	Bentleigh Greens (3)	3–2†	Caroline Springs George Cross (3)
VIC	–	136	Eastern Lions (3)	0–3	South Melbourne (2)
VIC	–	137	Mill Park (6)	5–1	Western Eagles (6)
VIC	–	138	Corio (5)	1–5†	Clifton Hill (5)
VIC	–	139	Melbourne Knights (2)	5–1	Beaumaris (5)
VIC	–	140	Old Ivanhoe (9)	2–3†	Werribee City (4)
VIC	–	141	Dallas City (6)	1–3	Preston Lions (2)
VIC	–	142	Box Hill United (4)	1–1†	Hampton East Brighton (5)
Hampton East Brighton advance 4–2 on penalties
VIC	–	143	Goulburn Valley Suns (4)	2–0	Port Melbourne (2)
VIC	–	144	Keilor Park (5)	0–1	Green Gully (2)
VIC	–	145	Westgate Sindjelic (5)	1–4	Avondale FC (2)
VIC	–	146	Croydon City (7)	0–5	North Sunshine Eagles (3)
VIC	–	147	FC Strathmore (6)	3–3†	Ballarat City (5)
Strathmore advance 6–5 on penalties
VIC	–	148	Manningham United Blues (3)	3–2	Bayside Argonauts (5)
VIC	–	149	Pascoe Vale (4)	5–0	Albion Rovers (6)
VIC	–	150	Dandenong Thunder (2)	3–2	Altona Magic (2)
Western Australia
WA	–	151	Olympic Kingsway (2)	5–2	Armadale SC (2)
WA	–	152	Western Knights (2)	1–0	Wanneroo City (4)
WA	–	153	Murdoch University Melville (3)	5–1	Port Kennedy (6)
WA	–	154	Bayswater City (2)	3–0	Balga SC (4)
WA	–	155	Stirling Macedonia (2)	3–0	Forrestfield United (4)
WA	–	156	Gwelup Croatia (3)	1–1†	Inglewood United (3)
Inglewood United advance 3–0 on penalties
WA	–	157	Kingsley Westside (3)	5–1	Football Margaret River (-)
WA	–	158	North Perth United (5)	2–3†	Curtin University (3)
WA	–	159	Perth RedStar (2)	1–1†	Floreat Athena (2)
Floreat Athena advance 5–4 on penalties
WA	–	160	Perth SC (2)	12–0	Perth AFC (6)
WA	–	161	Balcatta FC (2)	4–0	Wembley Downs (4)
WA	–	162	South Perth United (5)	0–3	Kalamunda City (3)
WA	–	163	UWA-Nedlands FC (3)	4–3	Canning City (4)
UWA-Nedlands removed after breaching competition rules.
WA	–	164	Fremantle City (2)	4–2†	East Perth (4)
WA	–	165	Sorrento FC (2)	3–5	Subiaco AFC (3)
WA	–	166	Quinns FC (4)	3–0	Gosnells City (3)

Notes:

- w/o = Walkover
- † = After Extra Time

== Fifth round ==
Fed.	Zone	Tie no	Home team (Tier)	Score	Away team (Tier)
Australian Capital Territory
ACT	–	1	CanberraCroatia (2)	4–0	Monaro Panthers (2)
ACT	–	2	Tuggeranong United (2)	5–4†	Yoogali SC (2)
ACT	–	3	Queanbeyan City (2)	2–0	Brindabella Blues (3)
ACT	–	4	Gungahlin United (2)	1–3†	Tigers FC (2)
New South Wales
NSW	–	5	Manly United (2)	0–4	Hills United (3)
NSW	–	6	Gymea United (-)	0–7	Blacktown City (2)
NSW	–	7	Granville Rage (4)	4–2†	Gunners SC (-)
NSW	–	8	Wollongong Olympic (-)	3–2	Bankstown United (4)
NSW	–	9	Marconi Stallions (2)	4–1	Prospect United (4)
NSW	–	10	Gladesville Ryde Magic (4)	3–0	Eastern Creek Pioneer (-)
NSW	–	11	SD Raiders (3)	2–1	Wollongong Wolves (2)
NSW	–	12	Narellan Rangers (-)	0–1	FC Shellharbour (-)
NSW	–	13	Cringila Lions (-)	3–2	Blacktown Spartans (3)
NSW	–	14	Rockdale Ilinden (2)	6–0	Sutherland Sharks (2)
NSW	–	15	Macarthur Rams (3)	1–3	NWS Spirit (2)
NSW	–	16	Northern Tigers (3)	4–0	Parramatta FC (4)
NSW	–	17	Arncliffe Aurora (-)	0–4	Sydney Olympic (2)
NSW	–	18	Sydney United 58 (2)	5–0	Tarrawanna Blueys (-)
NSW	–	19	Bulli FC (-)	4–0	Coogee United (-)
NSW	–	20	Wollongong United (-)	0–3	APIA Leichhardt (2)
Wollongong United forfeited the restarted match, after the original match was suspended in the fortieth minute with APIA Leichhardt leading 3–0.
Northern NSW
NNSW	NTH	21	Bangalow (-)	3–1	Westlawn Tigers (-)
NNSW	NTH	22	Port Saints (-)	0–3	Northern Storm (-)
NNSW	STH	23	Newcastle Olympic (2)	4–4†	Weston Bears (2)
Weston Bears advance 5–3 on penalties
NNSW	STH	24	Adamstown Rosebud (2)	1–2†	Lambton Jaffas (2)
NNSW	STH	25	Edgeworth Eagles (2)	4–1†	Toronto Awaba Stags (3)
NNSW	STH	26	Maitland FC (2)	4–0	Croudace Bay United (5)
NNSW	STH	27	Wallsend FC (3)	1–8	Cooks Hill United (2)
NNSW	STH	28	Broadmeadow Magic (2)	3–0	Charlestown Azzurri (2)
Northern Territory
NT	ASP	29	Verdi (2)	4–1	Stormbirds (2)
NT	DAR	30	Hellenic Athletic (2)	2–1†	Darwin Hearts (2)
NT	DAR	31	Port Darwin (2)	2–2†	Mindil Aces (2)
Mindil Aces advance 8–7 on penalties
Queensland
QLD	REG	32	Mackay Lions (5)	2–1	Across The Waves (5)
QLD	FNG v NTH	33	Marlin Coast Rangers (5)	3–0	MA Olympic (5)
QLD	SEQ	34	Olympic FC (2)	4–0	Logan Roos (6)
QLD	SEQ	35	Broadbeach United (3)	2–5	Wynnum Wolves (2)
QLD	SEQ	36	Taringa Rovers (4)	2–1	Ripley Valley (6)
QLD	SEQ	37	Yeronga Eagles (5)	1–1†	Old Bridge Salisbury (7)
Yeronga Eagles advance 6–5 on penalties
QLD	SEQ	38	Moggill (6)	1–2	Lions FC (2)
QLD	SEQ	39	Moreton City Excelsior (2)	6–3	Newmarket (5)
QLD	SEQ	40	Brisbane Knights (4)	2–11	Peninsula Power (2)
QLD	SEQ	41	Gold Coast Knights (2)	5–1	St George Willawong (2)
QLD	SEQ	42	Mt Gravatt Hawks (5)	0–6	Brisbane City (2)
QLD	SEQ	43	Rochedale Rovers (3)	3–1	Eastern Suburbs (2)
QLD	SEQ	44	Southside Eagles (3)	2–5	Gold Coast United (2)

Fed.	Zone	Tie no	Home team (Tier)	Score	Away team (Tier)
QLD	SEQ	45	Redlands United (3)	3–1	Brisbane Strikers (3)
QLD	SEQ	46	Coomera (5)	4–3†	Magic United (3)
QLD	SEQ	47	Mitchelton (4)	1–6	Logan Lightning (3)
South Australia
SA	–	48	Seaford Rangers (4)	2–4	Adelaide Comets (2)
SA	–	49	Adelaide Hills Hawks (4)	2–0	The Cove (3)
SA	–	50	North Eastern MetroStars (2)	4–1	Modbury Jets (2)
SA	–	51	Adelaide Olympic (3)	0–3	FK Beograd (2)
SA	–	52	West Torrens Birkalla (2)	3–0	Croydon (2)
SA	–	53	Adelaide Croatia Raiders (2)	3–2	Cumberland United (3)
SA	–	54	Fulham United (3)	3–1	Sturt Lions (3)
SA	–	55	Ghan United (4)	1–3	Campbelltown City (2)
Tasmania
TAS	–	56	South East United (3)	3–0	Clarence Zebras (2)
TAS	–	57	Kingborough Lions United (2)	0–4	Launceston City (2)
TAS	–	58	Riverside Olympic (2)	2–1	New Town White Eagles (3)
TAS	–	59	South Hobart (2)	4–3	Devonport City Strikers (2)
Victoria
VIC	–	60	Nunawading City (4)	7–2	Whittlesea Ranges (6)
VIC	–	61	Preston Lions (2)	2–3†	Whittlesea United (4)
VIC	–	62	Melbourne Srbija (3)	0–5	Hume City (2)
VIC	–	63	Brunswick City (3)	7–1	Mill Park (6)
VIC	–	64	Melbourne Knights (2)	3–0	Werribee City (4)
VIC	–	65	Oakleigh Cannons (2)	3–0	Bulleen Lions (3)
VIC	–	66	Avondale FC (2)	2–0	Altona City (4)
VIC	–	67	Bentleigh Greens (3)	1–2†	South Melbourne (2)
VIC	–	68	Pascoe Vale (4)	1–1†	Balmoral (8)
Pascoe Vale advance 5–3 on penalties
VIC	–	69	Langwarrin SC (3)	1–2	Clifton Hill (5)
VIC	–	70	Dandenong City (2)	4–1	Goulburn Valley Suns (4)
VIC	–	71	Green Gully (2)	0–0†	Dandenong Thunder (2)
Dandenong Thunder advance 4–2 on penalties
VIC	–	72	FC Strathmore (6)	0–8	Northcote City (3)
VIC	–	73	Chisholm United (6)	4–6	Manningham United Blues (3)
VIC	–	74	Heidelberg United (2)	3–0	Hampton East Brighton (5)
VIC	–	75	North Sunshine Eagles (3)	4–2	Banyule City (5)
Western Australia
WA	–	76	Stirling Macedonia (2)	7–1	Kingsley Westside (3)
WA	–	77	Kalamunda City (3)	1–2	Subiaco AFC (3)
WA	–	78	Bayswater City (2)	7–0	Quinns FC (4)
WA	–	79	Olympic Kingsway (2)	4–2	Perth SC (2)
WA	–	80	Inglewood United (3)	3–2	Fremantle City (2)
WA	–	81	Floreat Athena (2)	2–4	Balcatta FC (2)
WA	–	82	Canning City (4)	0–3	Murdoch University Melville (3)
WA	–	83	Western Knights (2)	2–1	Curtin University (3)

Notes:

- † = After Extra Time
- NT Byes: Darwin Olympic (2)

== Sixth round ==
Fed.	Zone	Tie no	Home team (Tier)	Score	Away team (Tier)
Australian Capital Territory
ACT	—	1	Queanbeyan City (2)	2–2†	Tigers FC (2)
Queanbeyan City advance 5–3 on penalties
ACT	—	2	Tuggeranong United (2)	0–6	Canberra Croatia (2)
New South Wales
NSW	—	3	SD Raiders (3)	3–3†	Rockdale Ilinden (2)
SD Raiders advance 5–4 on penalties
NSW	—	4	Wollongong Olympic (-)	1–3	Blacktown City (2)
NSW	—	5	Sydney United 58 (2)	3–3†	Sydney Olympic (2)
Sydney United advance 10–9 on penalties
NSW	—	6	Granville Rage (4)	2–1	Gladesville Ryde Magic (4)
NSW	—	7	FC Shellharbour (-)	0–1	Hills United (3)
NSW	—	8	Bulli FC (-)	1–2	Marconi Stallions (2)
NSW	—	9	Cringila Lions (-)	1–4	Northern Tigers (3)
NSW	—	10	NWS Spirit (2)	1–4	APIA Leichhardt (2)
Northern New South Wales
NNSW	—	11	Northern Storm (-)	0–1	Cooks Hill United (2)
NNSW	—	12	Edgeworth Eagles (2)	w/o	Bangalow (-)
NNSW	—	13	Maitland FC (2)	0–2	Broadmeadow Magic (2)
NNSW	—	14	Weston Bears (2)	2–1	Lambton Jaffas (2)
Northern Territory
NT	ASP v DAR	15	Darwin Olympic (2)	2–0	Verdi (2)
NT	DAR	16	Hellenic Athletic (2)	2–2†	Mindil Aces (2)
Mindil Aces advance 3–2 on penalties
Queensland
QLD	REG	17	Mackay Lions (5)	2–5	Marlin Coast Rangers (5)
QLD	SEQ	18	Peninsula Power (2)	3–1	Lions FC (2)
QLD	SEQ	19	Rochedale Rovers (3)	4–1	Gold Coast United (2)
QLD	SEQ	20	Taringa Rovers (4)	4–3	Yeronga Eagles (5)

Fed.	Zone	Tie no	Home team (Tier)	Score	Away team (Tier)
QLD	SEQ	21	Logan Lightning (3)	4–3†	Redlands United (3)
QLD	SEQ	22	Wynnum Wolves (2)	1–2	Gold Coast Knights (2)
QLD	SEQ	23	Moreton City Excelsior (2)	1–2	Olympic FC (2)
QLD	SEQ	24	Brisbane City (2)	8–0	Coomera (5)
South Australia
SA	—	25	WT Birkalla (2)	0–3	Adelaide Comets (2)
SA	—	26	Adelaide Croatia Raiders (2)	2–1	Adelaide Hills (4)
SA	—	27	FK Beograd (2)	3–3†	Fulham United (3)
Beograd advance 5–4 on penalties
SA	—	28	Campbelltown City (2)	1–3	North Eastern MetroStars (2)
Tasmania
TAS	—	29	South East United (3)	2–0	Launceston City (2)
TAS	—	30	Riverside Olympic (2)	0–4	South Hobart (2)
Victoria
VIC	—	31	South Melbourne (2)	2–1	Pascoe Vale (4)
VIC	—	32	North Sunshine Eagles (3)	1–4	Nunawading City (4)
VIC	—	33	Northcote City (3)	3–2	Melbourne Knights (2)
VIC	—	34	Dandenong City (2)	3–3†	Brunswick City (3)
Dandenong City advance 5–4 on penalties
VIC	—	35	Heidelberg United (2)	4–1	Clifton Hill (5)
VIC	—	36	Dandenong Thunder (2)	3–1	Whittlesea United (4)
VIC	—	37	Avondale FC (2)	5–0	Manningham United Blues (3)
VIC	—	38	Hume City (2)	3–2	Oakleigh Cannons (2)
Western Australia
WA	—	39	Stirling Macedonia (2)	0–0	Western Knights (2)
Stirling Macedonia advance 4–2 on penalties
WA	—	40	Bayswater City (2)	0–2	Inglewood United (3)
WA	—	41	Balcatta FC (2)	2–1	Murdoch University Melville (3)
WA	—	42	Olympic Kingsway (2)	3–0	Subiaco AFC (3)

Notes:

- † = After Extra Time
- w/o = Walkover

== Seventh round ==
Fed.	Zone	Tie no	Home team (Tier)	Score	Away team (Tier)
Australian Capital Territory
ACT	—	1	Queanbeyan City (2)	1–2†	Canberra Croatia (2)
New South Wales
NSW	—	2	Northern Tigers (3)	4–1	Hills United (3)
NSW	—	3	Blacktown City (2)	1–2	SD Raiders (3)
NSW	—	4	Sydney United 58 (2)	1–0	Granville Rage (4)
NSW	—	5	APIA Leichhardt (2)	3–2	Marconi Stallions (2)
Northern New South Wales
NNSW	—	6	Weston Bears (2)	1–1†	Edgeworth Eagles (2)
Weston Bears advance 3–1 on penalties
NNSW	—	7	Broadmeadow Magic (2)	1–2	Cooks Hill United (2)
Northern Territory
NT	—	8	Mindil Aces (2)	1–1†	Darwin Olympic (2)
Darwin Olympic advance 7–6 on penalties
Queensland
QLD	—	9	Marlin Coast Rangers (5)	2–3†	Peninsula Power (2)
QLD	—	10	Rochedale Rovers (3)	1–4	Gold Coast Knights (2)
QLD	—	11	Logan Lightning (3)	0–1	Brisbane City (2)

Fed.	Zone	Tie no	Home team (Tier)	Score	Away team (Tier)
QLD	—	12	Olympic FC (2)	1–0	Taringa Rovers (4)
South Australia
SA	—	13	Adelaide Croatia Raiders (2)	1–0	FK Beograd (2)
SA	—	14	North Eastern MetroStars (2)	1–1†	Adelaide Comets (2)
MetroStars advance 3–1 on penalties
Tasmania
TAS	—	15	South East United (3)	2–3	South Hobart (2)
Victoria
VIC	—	16	Avondale FC (2)	2–0†	Dandenong Thunder (2)
VIC	—	17	Dandenong City (2)	1–1†	South Melbourne (2)
South Melbourne advance 3–1 on penalties
VIC	—	18	Nunawading City (4)	4–0	Hume City (2)
VIC	—	19	Northcote City (3)	0–2	Heidelberg United (2)
Western Australia
WA	—	20	Stirling Macedonia (2)	1–0†	Inglewood United (3)
WA	—	21	Balcatta FC (2)	2–2†	Olympic Kingsway (2)
Olympic Kingsway advance 5–4 on penalties

Notes:

- † = After Extra Time

== A-League Men play-offs ==
The top nine placed A-League Men clubs from the 2024–25 A-League season gain automatic qualification to the Round of 32. The other four teams entered a play-off series to determine the remaining two positions.

13 May 2025
19:00 ACST

Central Coast Mariners	2–3 (a.e.t.)	Perth Glory
Majekodunmi 40' (o.g.); Kuol 44'	Report	Pearman 59'; Taggart 65'; Bugarija 98'

Larrakia Park, Darwin
Attendance: 1,496
Referee: Lachlan Keevers

14 May 2025
19:00 ACST

Wellington Phoenix	1–0	Brisbane Roar
Barbarouses 39'	Report

Larrakia Park, Darwin
Attendance: 1,813
Referee: Sam Kelly
