= Football Victoria South West =

Football Association based in the south-western region of Victoria, Australia

- Sport: Association football
- Founded: 2009 (as WDSL); 2026 (as FV South West)
- Affiliation: Football Victoria

Official website
- FV SOUTH WEST

Football Victoria South West, previously known as the South West Victoria Football Association (SWVFA), is a regional governing body and semi-professional association football competition based in the south-western region of Victoria, Australia.

The region's areas including Warrnambool, Hamilton, Horsham, and Colac. In 2026 following administrative restructure by Football Victoria to transition regional competitions into official direct zones.

== History ==
Association football in the South West region grew following the Second World War. Local teams began establishing themselves across the municipalities of Warrnambool, Port Fairy, Colac, Terang and Hamilton during the 1950s. Teams competed in the Western District League and Cup competitions, thriving for nearly a decade before unexpectedly dissolving. Organised senior football in the region went quiet for several decades, while the junior game gradually grew.

The Warrnambool and District Soccer League (WDSL) was founded in 2009. Fuelled by growing junior registrations, the league expanded to encompass clubs from Stawell, Portland, and Port Fairy. By 2020, the competition was rebranded as the South West Victoria Football Association (SWVFA).

In 2026, the league completed its transition into the state football governance under the official title of Football Victoria South West. As Football Victoria's restructured regional football to help streamline elite player pathways, coaching development, and local infrastructure support.

== Clubs ==
Club	Est.	Ground / location
Colac Otway Rovers AFC	2003	Western Reserve, Central Reserve, Beeac Recreation Reserve, Beeac and Colac
Grampians United FC	2018	North Park, Ararat / Stawell
Hamilton Raiders SC	2001	Pedrina Park, Hamilton
Horsham Falcons FC	2011	Dudley Cornell Reserve, Horsham
Port Fairy Soccer Club	1954/2020	Southcombe Park, Port Fairy
Warrnambool Rangers FC	2005	Jones Oval, Warrnambool
Warrnambool Wolves FC	1992	Brierly Recreation Reserve, Warrnambool

== Competitions ==
The region coordinates a full calendar of winter competitions spanning various formats and ages, culminating in the FV South West Season Finale Grand Final event.

- Senior Men's Division
- Senior Women's Division
- Junior Mixed & Girls Leagues (Under 12, Under 13 Girls, Under 14, Under 17)
- MiniRoos (Grassroots programs)

=== FV South West Cup ===
A domestic knockout tournament runs concurrently with the regular season.

=== Football Victoria Country Championship ===
The region also selects elite junior development squads to represent FV South West at the annual Football Victoria Country Championships.

== See also ==
- Football Victoria
- Soccer in Victoria (state)
- Victorian State League Men's
- Victorian Regional Leagues
