= List of record home attendances of Australian soccer clubs =

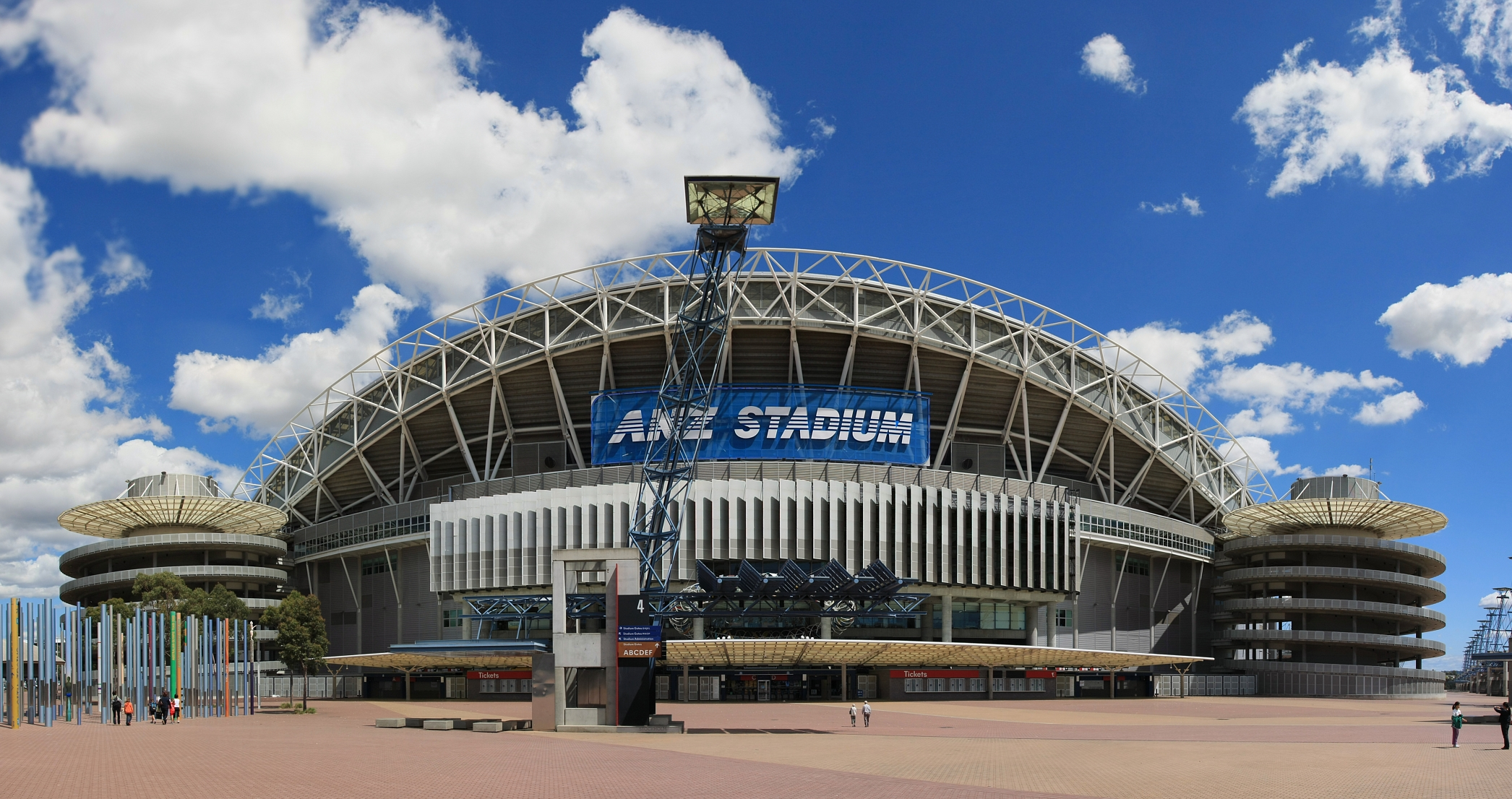
ANZ Stadium (now Accor Stadium), the temporary home of the Western Sydney Wanderers, holds the highest attendance for an Australian club soccer match.

This is a list of record home attendances of Australian soccer clubs. It lists the highest attendance of all current and past National Soccer League and A-League Men clubs for a competitive home match.

The club with the highest home attendance of all Australian soccer clubs is the Western Sydney Wanderers, with 61,880 attendance at ANZ Stadium against rivals Sydney FC on 8 October 2016. Most domestic league Grand Finals have been played at grounds not designated as usual home ground for the club that hosts the Grand Final, the highest in that matter is for Perth Glory with 56,371 at Optus Stadium on 19 May 2019.

== List ==
Records correct as of 14 November 2026. Italics denote attendance record set at ground not designated as usual home ground.

Rank	Club	Attendance	Stadium	Opposition	Competition	Date	Ref
1	Western Sydney Wanderers	61,880	ANZ Stadium	Sydney FC	A-League	8 October 2016	
2	Perth Glory	56,371	Optus Stadium	Sydney FC	A-League Grand Final	19 May 2019	
3	Melbourne Victory	55,436	Telstra Dome	Adelaide United	A-League Grand Final	18 February 2007	
4	Brisbane Roar	51,153	Suncorp Stadium	Western Sydney Wanderers	A-League Grand Final	4 May 2014	
5	Adelaide United	50,119	Adelaide Oval	Western Sydney Wanderers	A-League Grand Final	1 May 2016	
6	Sydney FC	41,689	Aussie Stadium	Central Coast Mariners	A-League Grand Final	5 March 2006	
7	Brisbane Strikers	40,446	Suncorp Stadium	Sydney United	National Soccer League Grand Final	25 May 1997	
8	Central Coast Mariners	36,354	Sydney Football Stadium	Newcastle Jets	A-League Grand Final	24 February 2008	
9	Wellington Phoenix	33,297	Sky Stadium	Melbourne Victory	A-League Men Semi-Final	18 May 2024	
10	South Melbourne	29,911	AAMI Park	Melbourne Victory	Australia Cup Final	10 October 2026	
11	Melbourne City	29,902	AAMI Park	Melbourne Victory	A-League Men Grand Final	31 May 2025	
12	Newcastle Jets	29,410	McDonald Jones Stadium	Melbourne Victory	A-League Grand Final	5 May 2018	
13	Auckland FC	29,148	Mount Smart Stadium	Melbourne Victory	A-League Men Semi-Final	25 May 2025	
14	Marconi Fairfield	26,353	Parramatta Stadium	Sydney Olympic	National Soccer League Grand Final	20 May 1990	
15	Melbourne Knights	23,318	Olympic Park Stadium	South Melbourne	National Soccer League Grand Final	5 May 1991	
16	North West Sydney Spirit	18,985	North Sydney Oval	Sydney Olympic	National Soccer League	9 October 1998	
17	Newcastle KB United	18,376	Newcastle International Sports Centre	Sydney Olympic	National Soccer League	14 April 1979	
18	Sydney United 58	17,064	Parramatta Stadium	Marconi Fairfield	National Soccer League Grand Final	3 September 1988	
19	West Adelaide	16,251	Hindmarsh Stadium	Adelaide City	National Soccer League Grand Final	27 August 1978	
20	Heidelberg United	15,000	Olympic Park	South Melbourne	National Soccer League	6 July 1980	
20	Heidelberg United	15,000	Olympic Park	South Melbourne	NSL Cup Semi-Finals	30 October 1983	
20	Heidelberg United	15,000	Olympic Village	Melbourne Knights	National Soccer League	28 April 1985	
21	Gold Coast United	14,783	Robina Stadium	Newcastle Jets	A-League	22 January 2011	
22	Blacktown City	14,220	Marconi Stadium	Sydney Croatia	National Soccer League	5 June 1985	
23	Sydney Olympic	14,032	Parramatta Stadium	Adelaide City	National Soccer League Grand Final	19 October 1986	
24	Wollongong Wolves	13,402	WIN Stadium	South Melbourne	National Soccer League Grand Final	3 June 2001	
25	Adelaide City	13,132	Olympic Sports Field	Marconi Fairfield	National Soccer League	3 July 1977	
26	Football Kingz	13,111	Westpac Stadium	Marconi Fairfield	National Soccer League	16 March 2001	
27	Brunswick Zebras	12,000	Middle Park Soccer Stadium	South Melbourne	National Soccer League	8 April 1984	
27	Footscray JUST	12,000	Middle Park Soccer Stadium	Marconi Fairfield	National Soccer League	20 August 1978	
29	APIA Leichhardt	11,156	St George Stadium	Marconi Fairfield	National Soccer League Minor Semi-Final	14 October 1984	
29	Hakoah Sydney City East	11,156	St George Stadium	Sydney Olympic	National Soccer League Major Semi-Final	14 October 1984	
31	Carlton	10,632	Princes Park	South Melbourne	National Soccer League	21 December 1997	
32	Collingwood Warriors	10,200	Victoria Park	Melbourne Knights	National Soccer League	13 October 1996	
33	Western United	10,128	GMHBA Stadium	Melbourne Victory	A-League	8 December 2019	
34	Parramatta Power	10,018	Parramatta Stadium	Sydney Olympic	National Soccer League	28 December 1999	
35	Preston Lions	10,000	South Melbourne	B.T. Connor Reserve	National Soccer League	21 August 1983	
36	New Zealand Knights	9,827	North Harbour Stadium	Sydney FC	A-League	2 September 2005	
37	Canberra Cosmos	9,421	Bruce Stadium	Newcastle Breakers	National Soccer League	1 November 1996	
38	St George	9,326	St George Stadium	Sydney Olympic	National Soccer League Preliminary Final	6 August 1989	
39	Macarthur FC	9,213	Campbelltown Stadium	Western Sydney Wanderers	A-League Men	3 May 2025	
40	North Queensland United	8,897	Dairy Farmers Stadium	Sydney FC	A-League	8 August 2009	
41	Canberra City	8,875	Bruce Stadium	Marconi Fairfield	National Soccer League	6 April 1980	
42	Falcons 2000	8,256	Falcons Park	South Melbourne	National Soccer League	29 January 1994	
43	Caroline Springs George Cross	8,000	Olympic Park	Canberra City	NSL Cup second round	2 August 1978	
44	Newcastle Breakers	7,674	Breakers Stadium	Adelaide Force	National Soccer League	21 January 2000	
45	Brisbane Lions	7,400	Perry Park	Brisbane City	National Soccer League	14 August 1977	
46	Western Suburbs	7,253	Sydney Sports Ground	Sydney Olympic	National Soccer League	8 May 1977	
47	Parramatta	7,246	Melita Stadium	Sydney Olympic	National Soccer League	23 January 1994	
48	Brisbane City	7,000	Perry Park	Marconi Fairfield	NSL Cup Final	1 May 1977	
49	Canterbury Bankstown	6,000	Sydney Athletic Field	Marconi Fairfield	National Soccer League	29 June 1986	
50	Wollongong United	5,217	Brandon Park	Preston Makedonia	National Soccer League	7 February 1991	
51	Mooroolbark	5,200	Middle Park	Western Suburbs	National Soccer League	10 July 1977	
52	Penrith City	3,514	Cook Park	Sydney Croatia	National Soccer League	11 March 1984	
53	Green Gully	3,500	Green Gully Reserve	South Melbourne	National Soccer League	11 March 1984	
53	Green Gully	3,500	Green Gully Reserve	Sunshine George Cross	National Soccer League	7 April 1985	
53	Green Gully	3,500	Green Gully Reserve	Melbourne Knights	National Soccer League	21 April 1985	
54	Monaro Panthers	3,275	Bruce Stadium	Sydney Croatia	National Soccer League	30 June 1985	
55	Sutherland Sharks	3,266	Seymour Shaw Park	South Melbourne	Australian Championship	17 October 2026	
56	Adamstown Rosebud	2,990	Adamstown Oval	Wollongong City	National Soccer League	7 October 1984	
