= Bendigo City FC =

Bendigo City Football Club
- Full name: Bendigo City Football Club
- Nickname: City
- Founded: 2014
- Ground: Epsom Huntly Recreation Reserve
- President: Peter Anderson
- Head Coach: Sean Boxshall
- League: MSL5

Bendigo City FC is the elite football club based in Bendigo, Australia. Bendigo City plays out of the Epsom Huntly Recreation Reserve soccer complex and holds an NPL (National Premier League) licence for junior boys, a CPL (Community Premier League) licence for junior girls, whilst the senior men's teams play in the Men's State Leagues. As of 2025, the club has never had a senior women's team.

== History ==
The club was established as FC Bendigo in 2014 as part of the newly formed National Premier Leagues Victoria (NPL) competition, and then reformed as Bendigo City FC the following year. FC Bendigo's original licence was held by Bendigo Amateur Soccer League (BASL) while the current entity is controlled by a private board and backed by the Bendigo City Council.

On the pitch, Bendigo had a solid first season in the National Premier Leagues Victoria 1. The Club finished 11th in the 14 team competition with 9 wins, 4 draws and 13 losses. Bendigo grabbed a memorable win against the eventually promoted North Geelong Warriors FC on 3 May 2014, when they beat the Lara-based outfit by three goals to two at Elcho Park.

In July 2015, Bendigo City FC's committee resigned after disagreements with junior parents and members regarding a re-structure of the club's finances, including the sacking of Technical Director Fab Soncin and the restructure of the Technical Director role from full-time to part-time. The committee was then reinstated 48 hours later at an Extraordinary General Meeting. The role of Technical Director was not filled for the remainder of the 2015 season.

The reformed Bendigo City FC based a large number of their senior squad on young local players rather than bringing in established players from Melbourne and overseas. Unfortunately for Bendigo, this resulted in a largely difficult campaign in the 2015 National Premier Leagues Victoria 2 West season, managing only six wins and seven draws from 28 games to finish second bottom of the league.

One round into the 2016 NPL2 season, City head coach Esteban Quintas quit his post to return to his native home of Spain. Bendigo's season slumped, earning just one win in the opening eight rounds and enduring heavy 2–7 and 1–7 defeats to North Geelong Warriors FC and Moreland Zebras FC respectively in Rounds 7 and 8 of the season, the latter their greatest ever defeat in their short life as a club. After another heavy loss, this time a 5–1 drubbing at the hands of Ballarat Red Devils, Bendigo City announced that Jose Montana Santamarta had been appointed as the club's new senior head coach, assisted by conditioning coach Alenjandro Montano Garcia. Bendigo City finished the season in bottom place on the NPL2 West table, with 4 wins and 3 draws in 28 games.

Bendigo appointed Srecko Baresic-Nikic as its new head coach for 2017, replacing the outgoing Jose Santamarta. Round 1 ended with a 5–0 home defeat to Northcote City FC followed by a 7-0 Round 2 home defeat to Moreland Zebras FC, a new record loss for the fledgling club. The appointment of Baresic-Nikic didn't last long, resigning in March after five games, with the side sitting bottom with just single point and 1 goal scored. Bendigo endured two more humiliating 7-0 defeats, to Ballarat City FC in Round 10 and to Box Hill United SC in Round 13. The season ended with a new record loss, losing 9–2 to Whittlesea Ranges FC. Bendigo finished the season in 10th place in NPL2 West, with a record of 0 wins, 2 draws and 26 losses. The team finished with a -105 goal difference. Promotion-relegation between the NPL and the State Leagues below was set to be introduced in 2017 and confirmed in October 2017, when Football Federation Victoria confirmed that Bendigo, along with Richmond SC, who finished bottom of NPL2 East, would be relegated to Victorian State League Division 1 for 2018. The statement also confirmed that Bendigo's juniors would remain in the NPL juniors competition, due to "geographical difficulties".

In January 2018, Bendigo City FC confirmed that it would not be fielding a senior or U20s team in State League 1 for 2018 and would continue as a junior-only NPL club for that season.

In 2019, Bendigo City welcomed back former U21 and Senior Assistant Coach Nathan Claridge, a local footballing identity, to its junior coaching staff. In 2020, Claridge was appointed as Technical Director and immediately began recruiting a coaching staff that would rebuild the program. The first coach signing was Greg Thomas, former Bendigo City Senior Coach (2015), ex-professional player and close friend of Claridge's. Subsequent coaching appointments included Ryan Pollard along with the return of Fab Soncin. Together, this group started to see an improvement in the performance on field. This was just the beginning however, as Claridge and Thomas spearheaded the return of senior football at Bendigo City lobbying key stakeholders and Football Victoria for re-entry into the Mens State League structure. In 2022, this became a reality and the reemergence of the club took a step forward with the reformation of the Bendigo City Senior program entering the football pyramid in Mens State League 5 West. Claridge retained his position as Technical Director whilst Thomas took on the role of Senior Coach in its inaugural season. With a young team composed almost entirely of former juniors from the club, the team ultimately finished in fourth place.
