= Victorian Regional Leagues =

The Victorian regional leagues are eight separate regional soccer leagues administered by Football Victoria.

Currently there is no promotion from the Victorian regional leagues to Victorian State League Men's.

== Leagues ==
- Football Victoria Greater Ballarat
- Football Victoria Greater Bendigo
- Football Victoria Geelong
- Football Victoria Latrobe Valley
- Football Victoria South West
- Football Victoria Gippsland

=== Football Victoria Shepparton ===
- Mansfield District SC
- Shepparton SC
- Shepparton South FC
- Shepparton United SC
- Tatura SC

=== Football Victoria Sunraysia ===
www.ffvsunraysia.com.au

- Irymple Knights SC
- Mildura City FC
- Mildura United SC
- Nichols Point SC
- Northern Suns FC
- Three Colours SC
