= Football Victoria Gippsland =

- Country: Australia
- Region: Gippsland, Victoria, Australia
- Number of clubs: 9 (2025)
- Website: footballvictoria.com.au

Football Victoria Gippsland (formerly the Gippsland Soccer League) is a regional association football (soccer) competition and governance body in Gippsland, Victoria, Australia, administered by Football Victoria.

== History ==
Soccer in South Gippsland has roots dating back to the early 1900s, particularly in Wonthaggi, which once hosted Victoria's State Coal Mine and supported multiple clubs in the Wonthaggi & District Soccer Association that ran from mid 1920s to 1930's.

Wonthaggi Magpies reached the Dockerty Cup final in 1929 and won the competition in 1931 - becoming the first team outside Melbourne to claim the trophy after two replays against Brunswick.

Following reductions in coal mining operations during the 1930s and the onset of World War II, organised football in South Gippsland largely receded for several decades.

Club activity was revived with the establishment of the Drouin Dragons in 1975, followed by later additions such as the Phillip Island Breakers and Trafalgar Victory. After a 2016 split that saw ten clubs reform a separate Latrobe Valley competition, the league refocused on South and West Gippsland. In 2026, Gippsland Soccer League moved under the administration of Football Victoria to become Football Victoria Gippsland.

== Clubs ==
The competition consists of nine member clubs:

Club	EST.	Home venue	Location
Drouin Dragons SC	1975	Bellbird Park	Drouin, Victoria
Inverloch Stars SC	2011	Thompson Reserve	Inverloch
Korumburra City SC		Korumburra Recreation Reserve	Korumburra
Lang Lang United SC	2015	Lang Lang Recreation Precinct	Lang Lang / Caldermeade
Leongatha Knights FC	2004	Mary MacKillop College	Leongatha
Mirboo North United FC		Walter J Tuck Reserve	Mirboo North
Phillip Island Breakers SC	1994	Newhaven Recreation Reserve	Newhaven
Trafalgar Victory FC	1996		Trafalgar
Wonthaggi United SC	2005	Wonthaggi Recreation Reserve	Wonthaggi

== Life members ==
Former GSL life memberships.

- David Wilson
- Linda Spiteri (Christy)
- Daniel Brown
- Andrea Blair-Dempsey
- Darren Dempsey
- Patrick Finnigan
- Philip Miller
- Glenn Odgers
- Bethany Milkins
- Jason Beer
- Kathryn Cooper

== See also ==
- Victorian regional leagues
- Football Victoria
- Soccer in Victoria
