= Victorian State League (1958–1990) =

- Organising body: Victorian Soccer Federation
- Founded: 1958; 68 years ago
- First season: 1958
- Folded: 10 September 1990; 36 years ago
- Country: Australia
- State: Victoria
- Divisions: 1
- Last champions: Heidelberg United (1990)
- Most championships: South Melbourne Hellas (7 titles)

The Victorian State League was a Victorian men's soccer league that was founded in 1958 after the dissolution of the original Victorian Soccer League and administered by the Victorian Soccer Federation (now Football Victoria). The league ran for 32 years before ultimately folding in 1990, with the introduction of the Victorian Premier League.

== History ==
In 1958, after the Victorian Amateur Soccer Federation was formed, the league disbanded, with the introduction of the Victorian State League. From 1962 until 1976 the league was largely dominated by South Melbourne Hellas and Footscray JUST, which won 11 titles between them.

With the creation of the National Soccer League (NSL) in 1977, the league gradually lost most of its stronger clubs, a trend that reached its peak between 1984 and 1986, when the NSL used a split conference system. After 1987, however, the league slowly started regaining clubs, firstly those discarded when the conference system experiment was abandoned and later when clubs became permanently relegated by the NSL to their respective state leagues. The dominant side during the years from 1977 to 2004 was Green Gully, who won six titles during this period, despite also missing the years 1984–1986 from being in the NSL.

The day after the final matchday in the final season in 1990, it was confirmed that the Victorian State League will cease to exist in replace of the Premier League of Victoria, that would then later be known as the Victorian Premier League.

== Champions ==
Season	Champions
1958	Juventus
1959	Wilhelmina
1960	Polonia
1961	Polonia
1962	South Melbourne Hellas
1963	J.U.S.T
1964	South Melbourne Hellas
1965	South Melbourne Hellas
1966	South Melbourne Hellas
1967	Melbourne Hungaria
1968	Croatia

Season	Champions
1969	Footscray J.U.S.T
1970	Juventus
1971	Footscray J.U.S.T
1972	South Melbourne Hellas
1973	Footscray J.U.S.T
1974	South Melbourne Hellas
1975	Fitzroy United
1976	South Melbourne Hellas
1977	George Cross Courage
1978	Essendon Croatia
1979	Essendon Croatia

Season	Champions
1980	Preston Makedonia
1981	Green Gully
1982	Green Gully
1983	Green Gully
1984	Morwell Falcons
1985	Croydon City
1986	Croydon City
1987	Maribrynong Polonia
1988	Heidelberg United
1989	Morwell Falcons
1990	Heidelberg United
