= George Slifkas =

Australian soccer player

Personal information
- Full name: George Slifkas
- Date of birth: 18 October 1969 (age 57)
- Place of birth: Australia
- Position: Striker

Senior career*
Years	Team	Apps	(Gls)
1988–1990	Preston Lions	24	(0)
1990–1993	Heidelberg United	60	(1)
1993	Thomastown Zebras	9	(0)
1993–1996	West Adelaide	47	(1)
1996	Bulleen Zebras	17	(1)
1997	Heidelberg United	15	(2)
1998–2000	Thomastown Zebras	57	(2)
2001–2002	Preston Lions	10	(0)

International career
1993	Australia	1	(0)
- * Club domestic league appearances and goals

George Slifkas (born 18 October 1969) is an Australian former soccer player.

== Playing career ==
=== Club career ===
Slifkas played for Preston Makedonia, Heidelberg United and West Adelaide in the National Soccer League in the late 1980s and early 1990s. From the mid-1990s he dropped down to the Victorian Premier League where he played for the Bulleen Lions, the Thomastown Zebras and the Melbourne Raiders.

=== International career ===
At the 1992 Barcelona Olympics Slifkas played four matches as Australia placed fourth.

In 1993 Slifkas made his first and only international appearance for Australia as a substitute in a match against South Korea.
