= Melbourne University Soccer Club =

University football club based in Australia

Melbourne University
- Nicknames: MUSC, Uniblues
- Founded: 9 July 1947
- Ground: Princes Park, Carlton
- Coordinates: 37°47′7″S 144°57′34″E
- Chairman: Michael Owen
- League: Victorian Premier League
- Website: https://www.musc.com.au/
Home colours	Away colours

Melbourne University Soccer Club, often known as Uniblues, is an Australian association football club based at the University of Melbourne.

The club fields 19 teams for men and women across varying levels of performance, from high-level competitive leagues through to social levels.

The top women's team competes in the NPL Victoria league. The top men's team competes in the Northern division of Victorian State League 4, both governed by Football Federation Victoria.

== History ==
A volunteer club, MUSC was founded Wednesday, 9 July 1947 by students of the University of Melbourne. It has now grown to be one of Victoria's largest senior soccer clubs. Originally founded by University of Melbourne students, the club has a long history rooted in university culture and student participation.

== Facilities ==
MUSC is based at Princes Park, Carlton, offering state-of-the-art facilities for training and matches. This location serves as the home ground for the club's most competitive teams as well as recreational squads.

== Women's team & Community Involvement ==
A women's team was formed 1982, one of the first women's soccer teams in Australia. As a result, MUSC grew in popularity with women players.

"I later learned that the club was having to consider turning away players, such was the desire for women at university to play soccer."

— Robyn Metcalfe, founding women's team player

MUSC's initiatives extend to various community services and charity events, promoting inclusivity and diversity within the sport. One example is the All Gender Games (AGG).

== Competitive Results ==
The club facilitates intervarsity teams, for both the Southern University Games and Australian University Games.

MUSC has received several competitive trophies, including gold medals at the Australian University Games in 2009 and 2015.

The club has also participated in several international invitational competitions, such as the World Elite University Football Tournament since 2016.
