= Football Victoria Greater Bendigo =

- Founded: 1970 (as Bendigo Amateur Soccer League); 2026 (as Football Victoria Greater Bendigo)
- Level on pyramid: Level 10 on Australian soccer league system
- Website: footballvictoria.com.au/regions/fv-greater-bendigo

Football Victoria Greater Bendigo (formerly the Bendigo Amateur Soccer League or BASL) is the regional governing body of soccer in Bendigo, Central Victoria, northern Victoria, and southern New South Wales.

== History ==
Formed in 1970 as the BASL, the league expanded post-World War II to oversee competitions across Central Victoria and southern New South Wales. Following a 2024 regional review by Football Victoria, the association transitioned into Football Victoria Greater Bendigo in January 2026.

== Clubs ==
Club	Established	Home venue	Suburb / Town
Bendigo City FC	2014	Epsom Huntly Recreation Reserve	Bendigo
Castlemaine Goldfields FC	1952	Chewton Soldiers Memorial Park	Chewton (Castlemaine)
Deniliquin Wanderers SC	1960	Hardinge Street Oval	Deniliquin (NSW)
Echuca Moama Border Raiders FC	2007	Jack Eddy Oval (Moama Recreation Reserve)	Moama (NSW) / Echuca
Epsom FC	1977	Epsom Huntly Recreation Reserve	Epsom / Huntly
FC Eaglehawk	1974	Truscott Reserve	California Gully (Eaglehawk)
Golden City FC	1971	Shadforth Park	North Bendigo
Kyneton District SC	1973	Barkly Square	Kyneton
La Trobe University SC (Bendigo)	1971	La Trobe University Bendigo Sports Field	Flora Hill
Spring Gully United SC	1971	Stanley Avenue Pitches (Spring Gully Recreation Reserve)	Spring Gully
Strathdale SC	1970	Beischer Park	Strathdale
Strathfieldsaye Colts United FC	1977	Tannery Lane Reserve	Strathfieldsaye
Swan Hill SC	1974	Ken Harrison Reserve	Swan Hill
Woodend Eagles SC	2013	Buffalo Stadium / Woodend Racecourse Reserve	Woodend

== Life Members ==
- Geoff Boyle (2005)
- Margaret Bradley (1985)
- Bailey Browning (1995)
- Loris Browning (1999)
- Stephen Butler (1996)
- Ian Clutton (2002)
- Roy Davies (1986)
- Robin Doyle (Shrestcha) (1984)
- Terry Gormley (1994)
- George Harper (1982)
- Allan Harwood (1983)
- Stan Hodson (1978)
- Christopher King (2002)
- Allan Lassey (1991)
- Anthony Longano (1982)
- Neil McDermid (1987)
- Mel McGovern (1992)
- Ian Platt (1975)
- Matt Schepers (2005)
- Rhonda Schepers (1985)
- Trish Shanahan (1983)
- Jim Shepherd (1985)
- Roland Sowerby (1988)
- Phillip Tresize (1996)
- William Trew (1995)
- Greg Warren (1994)
- David Weatherall (1979)
- David Wilkinson (1972)
- Ted Ellinghous (1981)
- Michael Roche (1984)
- Arthur Curtain (1986)
- Dennis Curnow (1986)
- Craig Riley (1980)
- Peter Kaladis (1976)
- James Anderson (1987)
- Jan Hente (1973)
- Michael John (1972)
- Barry Moore (1978)
- Ronald Priest (1995)
- Leslie Rowe (1981)
- John Webb (1984)
- Darryl Brown (2024)
- Ron Cole (2024)
- Andrew Mertons (2024)
- Ian Schepers (2025)

== See also ==
- Victorian regional leagues
- Football Victoria
- Soccer in Victoria
