= Ballarat Regional Soccer Facility =

Stadium in Redan, Victoria, Australia

- Morshead Park Stadium

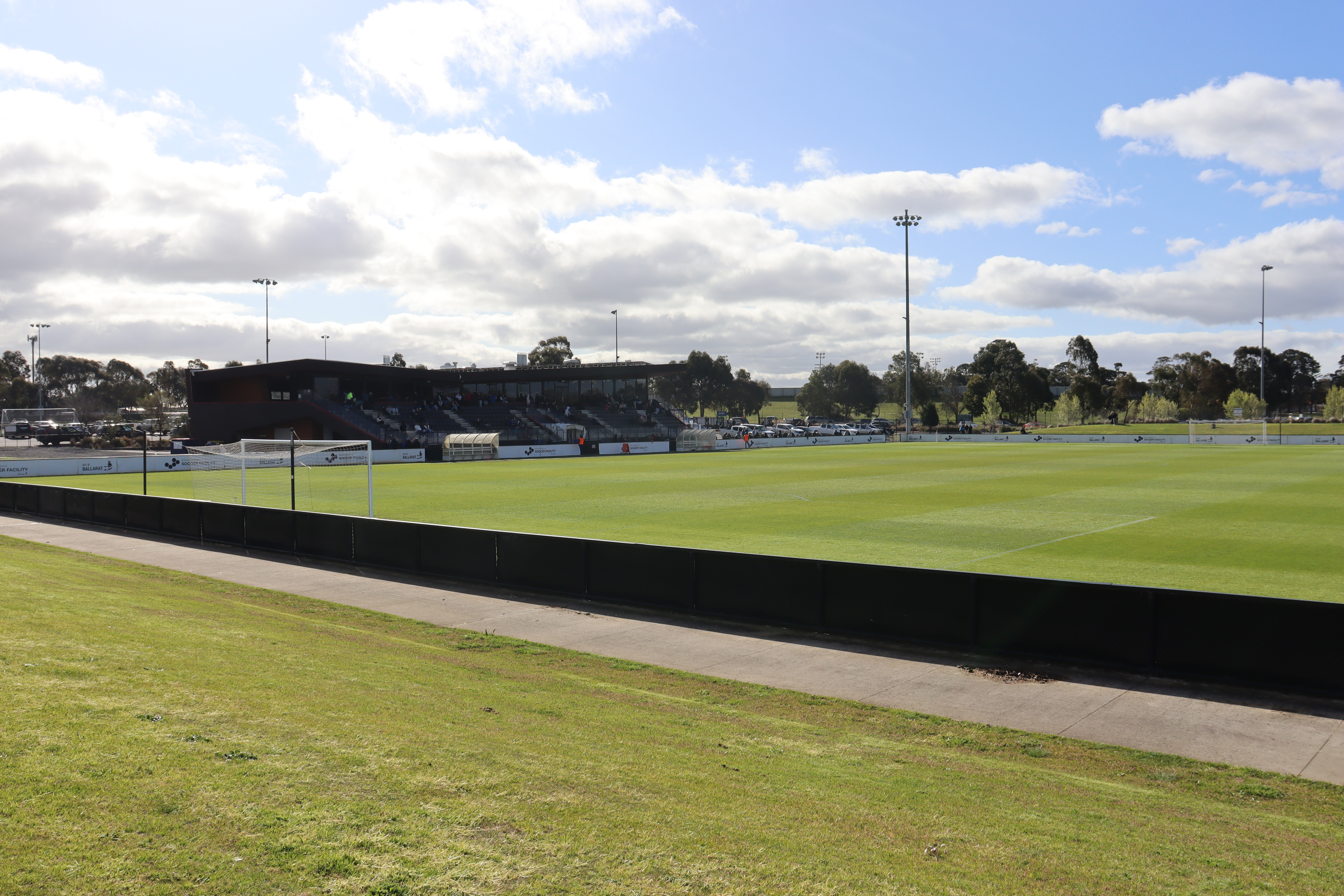
- The stadium hosting local association football
- Interactive map of Ballarat Regional Soccer Facility
- Location: Morshead Park Stadium, Redan, Ballarat, Victoria
- Coordinates: 37°34′47.2″S 143°50′03.6″E
- Owner: City of Ballarat
- Capacity: 8,500 (Venue Capacity); 500 (Seated Capacity); Up to 12,000 with temporary stands
- Surface: Grass

Construction
- Opened: 2014
- Cost: $13.85 million
- Architect: k20 Architecture

Tenants
- Ballarat City FC (2014–present); Western United FC (2022–present)

The Ballarat Regional Soccer Facility, also referred to by its location as Morshead Park Stadium, is an association football-specific stadium in Redan, a suburb immediately to the south of central Ballarat, Victoria, Australia. It is the home of the Ballarat City FC Men's and Women's Team, who play in the Victorian State League, the fifth tier of Australian football league system.

== Construction ==
During 2013, the City of Ballarat Council matched a Federal Government investment of $2.675 million announced by then Prime Minister of Australia Julia Gillard in June of that year in a major upgrade of Morshead Park with a view to host training for National Teams in the 2015 Asian Cup, including new grandstands, lights and returfing the field to form the Ballarat Regional Soccer Facility.

The main grandstand seats 500, with an additional standing capacity for a further 8000 on viewing embankments. There is space for temporary stands to be erected across from the main grandstand to bring the total capacity up to 12,000.

Aside from the main pitch, there are two further fully lit football fields adjacent. In total, the facility adds 3,000 pitch hours of availability annually to local clubs.

== Tenants ==
The Ballarat Red Devils played their first game in the stadium on 3 May 2014, losing 1-2 to South Melbourne FC in the NPLV, although the main grandstand was not yet fully complete. South Melbourne player Milos Lujic scored the inaugural goal in the facility.

On 9 May 2014, Premier of Victoria Denis Napthine announced that the facility would be hosting the Bahrain national football team for a sixteen-day training camp prior to the Asian Cup.

Western United played an A-League Men match against Wellington Phoenix at Morsehead Park on 9 April 2022.

== See also ==
Football Victoria Greater Ballarat
