= Darebin United SC =

Darebin United Apollo SC
- Full name: Darebin United Soccer Club
- Nickname: Apollo
- Founded: 1975
- Ground: Mayer Park, Thornbury
- President: Michael Slaughter
- Senior Coach: Steven Kalona
- League: Victorian State League 5 North
- 2025: 8th
- Website: https://darebinunited.com
Home colours	Away colours

Darebin United is a soccer club representing the City of Darebin based in Melbourne, Victoria.

== History ==
Darebin United Soccer Club was established in 1975 by Greek immigrants and is located in Mayer Park.

Its Men's Senior & Reserves teams compete in Football Federation Victoria's Men's State League 5 competition.

In 2014, Darebin United Soccer Club introduced a Junior team and have since added 14 more Junior teams. The Junior Teams that it caters for include: Boys: Mini Roos, Under 7's. Under 8's, Under 9's, Under 10's, Under 11's, Under 12's, Under 13's, Under 14's, Unser 15's, Under 16's, Under 18's Girls: Mini Roo's, Under 7's, Under 10s, Under 12's, Under 15's and Under 16's.

They have over 25 Teams, 300 players and 500 members. They are Darebins first 2 star FA Club Changer Club and is fully independent from any academy affiliation.

=== Divisional history ===
Season	League	Position	Wins	Draws	Losses	Points
1995	Victorian Provisional League 3 North-West	2nd	15	2	5	47
1996	Victorian Provisional League 3 North-West	7th	9	2	11	29
1997	Victorian Provisional League 3 North-West	3rd	14	3	5	45
1998	Victorian Provisional League 3 North-West	4th	10	4	6	34
1999	Victorian Provisional League 3 North-West	3rd	14	1	7	43
2000	Victorian Provisional League 2 North-West	4th	10	6	6	36
2001	Victorian Provisional League 1 North-West	5th	8	5	9	29
2002	Victorian Provisional League 1 North-West	7th	8	3	11	27
2003	Victorian Provisional League 1 North-West	2nd	13	4	5	43
2004	Victorian State League 3 North-West	10th	5	7	10	22
2005	Victorian State League 3 North-West	12th	2	2	18	8
2006	Victorian Provisional League 1 North-West	10th	5	5	13	19
2007	Victorian Provisional League 1 North-West	11th	3	7	12	16
2008	Victorian Provisional League 2 North-West	9th	7	2	13	23
2009	Victorian Provisional League 2 North-West	12th	2	4	16	10
2010	Victorian Provisional League 3 North-West	3rd	12	3	7	38
2011	Victorian Provisional League 3 North-West	7th	9	5	8	32
2012	Victorian Provisional League 3 North-West	2nd	15	3	4	48
2013	Victorian State League 4 North	10th	6	4	12	22
2014	Victorian State League 4 North	2nd	14	1	7	43
2015	Victorian State League 3 North-West	8th	7	5	10	26
2016	Victorian State League 3 North-West	11th	3	7	12	16
2017	Victorian State League 4 North	9th	6	6	10	24
2018	Victorian State League 4 North	3rd	11	5	6	38
2019	State League 4 North	9th	5	5	12	20
2020	State League 4 North	COVID				
2021	State League 4 North	COVID				
2022	State League 4 North	7th				
2023	State League 4 North	11th	5	5	12	20

- The Oz Football database was used as the source for 1995–2011 season results.

== Rivalries ==
Darebin United shares a friendly rivalry with neighbouring side West Preston. When in the same division the two clubs play off for the ‘Darebin Community Cup’ proudly supported by National Premier Leagues Victoria club Northcote City FC. The Cup was first contested in the 2014 season when the two teams met twice in the regular home and away fixture. Darebin United won the cup defeating West Preston comfortably 3–0.

=== 2026 Squad List ===
Coaching Team:

Senior Coach: Steven Kalona Asst Coach: Zsolt Muresan

Nationality	Position	Full Name
(Greece)	GK	Dallas Colelough
(Australia)	GK	Ben Bozinovski
(Greece)	LB	
(Greece)	RB	Stacey Tsalkos
(Greece)	CB	Chris Dimitropoulos
(Timor-Leste)	CB	
(Netherlands)	LB	
(Serbia)	CB	Nemanja Mijatovic
(Brazil)	LB	
(Australia)	RB	Nathan Warrington
(Australia)	LW	Luke
(Greece)	CM	Michael
(Greece)	CM	Pat
(Greece)	CM	Theodore Tzoutzidis
(Greece)	RB	Ross
(Australia)	CAM	Christian
(New Zealand)	LW	Mika
(Australia)	ST	Josh
(Australia)	ST	Seth

== Honours ==
- 2014 Victorian State League 4 North Runners-Up
- 2012 Victorian Provisional League 3 North-West Runners-Up
- 2003 Victorian Provisional League 1 North-West Runners-Up
- 1995 Victorian Provisional League 3 North-West Runners-Up
