= Latrobe City Stadium =

Multi purpose sport stadium located in Morwell, Australia

Gippsland Sports and Entertainment Park
- Falcons Park
- Interactive map of Gippsland Sports and Entertainment Park
- Former names: Falcons Park; Mobil Park; Latrobe City Stadium; North Crinigan Reserve
- Location: Crinigan Road, Morwell, Victoria
- Coordinates: 38°12′58″S 146°25′41″E
- Owner: Latrobe City Council
- Capacity: 12,000 (1,912 Seats)
- Surface: Grass
- Record attendance: 8,400

Construction
- Opened: 1981
- Renovated: 1992-94, 2025-26
- Architects: Don Di Fabrizio Grandstand: Gerhard Giedrojc (architect), Bill Gamble (designer)

Tenants
- Morwell Falcons/Falcons 2000 (1978−2025, 2027-) Melbourne Rising (NRC) (2015–2018) Melbourne Storm (NRL) (Trials 2003)

Gippsland Sports and Entertainment Park is a multi purpose sport stadium located in Morwell, Victoria, Australia.

Opened in 1981 and originally known as North Crinigan Reserve, today it is the home ground of the Falcons 2000 in the Latrobe Valley Soccer League.

Whilst the facility is primarily used for soccer, it has also hosted one-off matches of rugby league, rugby union and American football.

Colloquially known as Falcons Park or Mobil Park (thanks to a long-running sponsorship with Mobil Australia), the broader precinct is officially known as Gippsland Sports and Entertainment Park.

The venue is the largest rectangular stadium in Victoria outside Melbourne.

== History ==
It was previously the home ground of the defunct Gippsland Falcons during their tenure in the National Soccer League, and briefly in the Victoria Premier League. The Melbourne Rising rugby union club previously hosted a number of National Rugby Championship matches at the stadium.

In 1982 - the Falcons' second year at the venue after moving from Keegan Street Reserve - the ground's first Club Rooms were opened, with a covered terrace that provided room for 1000 spectators, and a function hall with seating for 600 patrons.

On March 14, 1992, with the Falcons having invested several million dollars of their own money into the development of GSEP after arriving at the venue in 1978 - taking it from bare farmland into one of the finest sporting facilities in regional Australia - Latrobe City Council approved the sale of the precinct to the Falcons for $30,200.

In 1994, the Bill Gamble-designed Don Di Fabrizio Stand was opened, bringing the total seating capacity of the stadium to 1,912. The total cost of the grandstand came in at $1.6 million - but this figure was supplemented by approximately 42,000 hours of voluntary labour and donated or reduced-cost materials.

After the Falcons departed the National Soccer League in 2001 and returned to the Latrobe Valley Soccer League, the facility moved into private ownership before being acquired by Latrobe City Council in 2017 for $4.2 million.

The facility was originally slated to host Rugby 7's at the 2026 Commonwealth Games and was due to receive a major overhaul as part of the proposal to host the event, before the Victorian State Government decided to pull out of the hosting the Gammes due to unforeseen hosting costs.

Despite the Government retracting its hosting commitment, they decided to press ahead with the upgrades to the facility, which are due for completion in October 2026.

During the 2025-26 redevelopment, Falcons 2000 were forced to move to Keegan Street Reserve on Morwell's southern fringe - the very same facility they played at between 1974 and 1977 before moving to North Crinigan Reserve in time for the 1978 season.

== Notable fixtures ==
The first ever international football match to be played in Victoria outside Melbourne took place in Morwell when the Olyroos hosted South Korea in an under-23 match on January 15, 1999. The match was part of a series to help prepare both teams for the 2000 Olympics, with South Korea winning the game 1-0 thanks to a 17th minute goal by Lee Kwan-woo.

The stadium held a Victorian Premier League match in 2008 between the Australian Institute of Sport and Oakleigh Cannons, as well as several Victorian Women's Premier League matches during the same year.

On 8 July 2010, the venue held an A-League practice match between Melbourne Heart and Newcastle Jets. Newcastle won the match 2–1 in front of 3,000 spectators. On 13 November 2010, Falcons Park was host to the Melbourne Victory Women when they played Sydney FC Women in Round 2 of the W-League. Sydney FC beat Melbourne Victory 4–1.

The venue hosted an A-League "Regional Round" clash between Melbourne Heart and Wellington Phoenix on 4 December 2011. Melbourne Heart won the match 1–0 with Mate Dugandzic scoring in the 41st minute. 2,951 people attended the game.

Playing for Senior NTC in the National Premier Leagues Victoria Women in 2017, Matildas midfielder Kyra Cooney-Cross - who was aged just 15 at the time - scored a hat-trick at the venue in a 6-3 win over Southern United on May 14, 2017.

== Attendance records ==
No.	Date	Teams	Sport	Competition	Crowd
1	1995	Morwell Falcons v. South Melbourne	Soccer	NSL	8,400
2	21 January 2011	Melbourne Rebels v. Tonga	Rugby union	Super Rugby (trial)	3,853
3	1 March 2003	Melbourne Storm v. Canberra Raiders	Rugby league	NRL (preseason)	3,000
4	7 August 2010	Melbourne Heart v. Newcastle Jets	Soccer	A-League (preseason)	3,000
5	4 December 2011	Melbourne Heart v. Wellington Phoenix	Soccer	A-League	2,951
