= Football Victoria Greater Ballarat =

Regional soccer governing body in Ballarat Victoria, Australia

- Sport: Soccer
- Founded: 1952
- Affiliation: Football Victoria / Football Australia
- Location: Ballarat

The Football Victoria Greater Ballarat formally know as the Ballarat & District Soccer Association (BDSA) is the governing body for association football (soccer) in Ballarat and the surrounding Western Victoria region.

== History ==
Organised soccer in Ballarat began in 1927 when a representative squad entered Geelong's regional Madden Cup, winning the tournament in 1928. Local growth stalled over the next two decades due to the Great Depression and World War II.

Post-war European migration brought an influx of players to regional Victoria, leading to the official formation of the Ballarat Soccer Association in 1952. Early clubs reflected this migration, including Dutch-backed teams such as Juliana, Wilhelmina, Hollandia, and Fortuna.

In 1963, following a Melbourne metropolitan competition overhaul by the Victorian Soccer Federation, the league merged with the Geelong & District Soccer League to form the Ballarat/Geelong & Districts Soccer Association. The partnership dissolved in 1974 due to travel challenges, competitive imbalance and the desire of some teams to play against metro clubs. Following the split, the local body reverted to the Ballarat & District Soccer Association (BDSA).

In 2014, a major upgrade at Morshead park created the Ballarat Regional Soccer Facility.

In late 2024, following other regional soccer leagues, member clubs of the Ballarat & District Soccer Association voted to hand over management to the state governing body. Football Victoria assuming control in January 2026.

== Member clubs ==
Club Name	Home ground / location
Bacchus Marsh Scorpions SC	Bacchus Marsh Racecourse and Recreation Reserve
Ballarat City FC	Morshead Park Stadium, Ballarat Region Soccer Facility
Ballarat North United Panthers SC	Russell Square, Brown Hill
Ballarat SC	Trekardo Park, Redan
Buninyong Redbacks SC	Royal Park, Buninyong
Castlemaine Goldfields SC	Castlemaine
Creswick Cougars SC	Doug Lindsay Reserve, Creswick
Daylesford & Hepburn United SC	Victoria Park, Daylesford
Forest Rangers SC	Wendouree West Recreation Reserve, Ballarat
Horsham & District SC	Horsham
Maryborough SC	Maryborough
Sebastopol Vikings SC	Sebastopol
Victoria Park Vultures FC	Victoria Park, Ballarat

== Life members ==
- Fred Maggi
- Edna Oliver
- J. Nicholson
- Peg Peterson
- Ken Reeves
- Kingsley Curtis
- Herman Bogers
- Gwen Quince
- Lola Pierce
- Graham Smith
- Neville Keen
- Steve Briggs
- Marilyn Tyndall
- Peter Reid OAM
- Kathy Payton
- Howard Wilson
- Tracy Dean

== Notable players ==
Notable players who have played for Football Victoria Greater Ballarat or Ballarat & District Soccer Association teams.

- Brandon Lauton
- Kyra Cooney-Cross
- Stefan Nigro

== Scott Anwyl Medal ==
The league's highest individual award for the Men's senior open division Best & Fairest:

- 2024: Kyle Steward (Bacchus Marsh)
- 2023: Kuanyjal Tuany (Sebastopol Vikings)
- 2022: Ryan Liston (Victoria Park)
- 2021: Oliver Richardson (Ballarat North United) & Ryan Bail (Warrnambool Rangers)
- 2020: No season due to COVID-19 pandemic
- 2019: Owen Turbitt (Daylesford & Hepburn United)
- 2018: Ryan Rykers (Sebastopol Vikings)
- 2017: Ryan Rykers (Sebastopol Vikings)

== See also ==
- Ballarat Regional Soccer Facility
- Football Victoria
- Association football in Victoria
