= Ballarat City FC =

Ballarat City
- Full name: Ballarat City FC
- Founded: 1968; 58 years ago
- Ground: Ballarat Regional Soccer Facility
- Capacity: 8,500
- Chairman: Brett Bedggood
- League: Victorian State League 1 North–West
- 2026: 5th of 12
- Website: www.ballaratcityfc.com.au
Home colours	Away colours

Ballarat City FC is an Australian semi-professional association football club based in Ballarat, Victoria. For most of its history, the club's home ground was Trekardo Park, before making the move to the Ballarat Regional Soccer Facility in 2014.

After the 2016 National Premier Leagues Victoria 2 season, the club members voted to reform the club from Ballarat Red Devils to Ballarat City, a move sanctioned by the Football Federation Victoria as they transferred the club's NPLV licence to the new entity.

== History ==
=== Early history ===
The club was established in 1968 as Ballarat SC, and played their first six seasons at Llanberris Reserve, now home to the Ballarat Athletics Club, before moving to Trekardo Park in 1973. Ballarat originally played in an all-Red kit (i.e. Liverpool FC), which changed to white shorts in 1992, and now play in a similar kit to the famous Manchester United, incorporating red shirts, white shorts and black socks.

=== Victorian State Leagues ===
In their first season playing in the Melbourne-based competition, Ballarat secured its first championship, under foundation captain-coach and goalkeeper Eddie Wood, and led by Hugh Rattray, who scored 59 goals in 21 matches, still a current Australian record for number of goals in one season at a semi-professional level.

Ballarat waited 24 years until their next title came along, in 1992, in which the team remained undefeated throughout the entire 26-match Provisional League Two (FFV Div. 6) season, also a standing record. Incidentally, that team went 36 matches until being beaten 2–0 by East Geelong at Trekardo Park. Furthermore, '92 Ballarat side scored in every match of that unbeaten season. The team was coached by Jim Bull, who was also a full-back in the '68 Championship.

In 1998, the club changed its name to Ballarat United SC. After back-to-back promotions in 2003 (FFV Div. 6) and 2004 (FFV Div. 5), United avoided relegation in 2004 and 2005, in the last match of each season, needing a positive result in each to stay up. They achieved this. The club changed its name in 2005 to Ballarat Red Devils.

The 2007 season started with a new coach in charge, Danny Gnjidic, and the club went on to win the State League 3 North-West Championship on the last day of the season with a 4–3 win over their rivals, Geelong SC. Ballarat won after being down 2–0 at the 9 minute mark. In 2008, the club was at its highest level to date in State League 2 North-West. At the end of the 2009 season, by mutual consent the club and Danny Gnjidic parted ways.

In late 2009 the club appointed South African Dale Harris as the coach for 2010. Harris was sacked on 28 June after a poor start to the season and was replaced by Michael Leslie who became player-manager. Former reserves coach Joe Fedele was appointed as the Reds new boss in late 2010.

Following Shelley's move and dominating displays for the Ballarat Red Devils in 2011, Shelley signed as Manager for the Red Devils for 2 years during October 2011.

=== National Premier Leagues ===
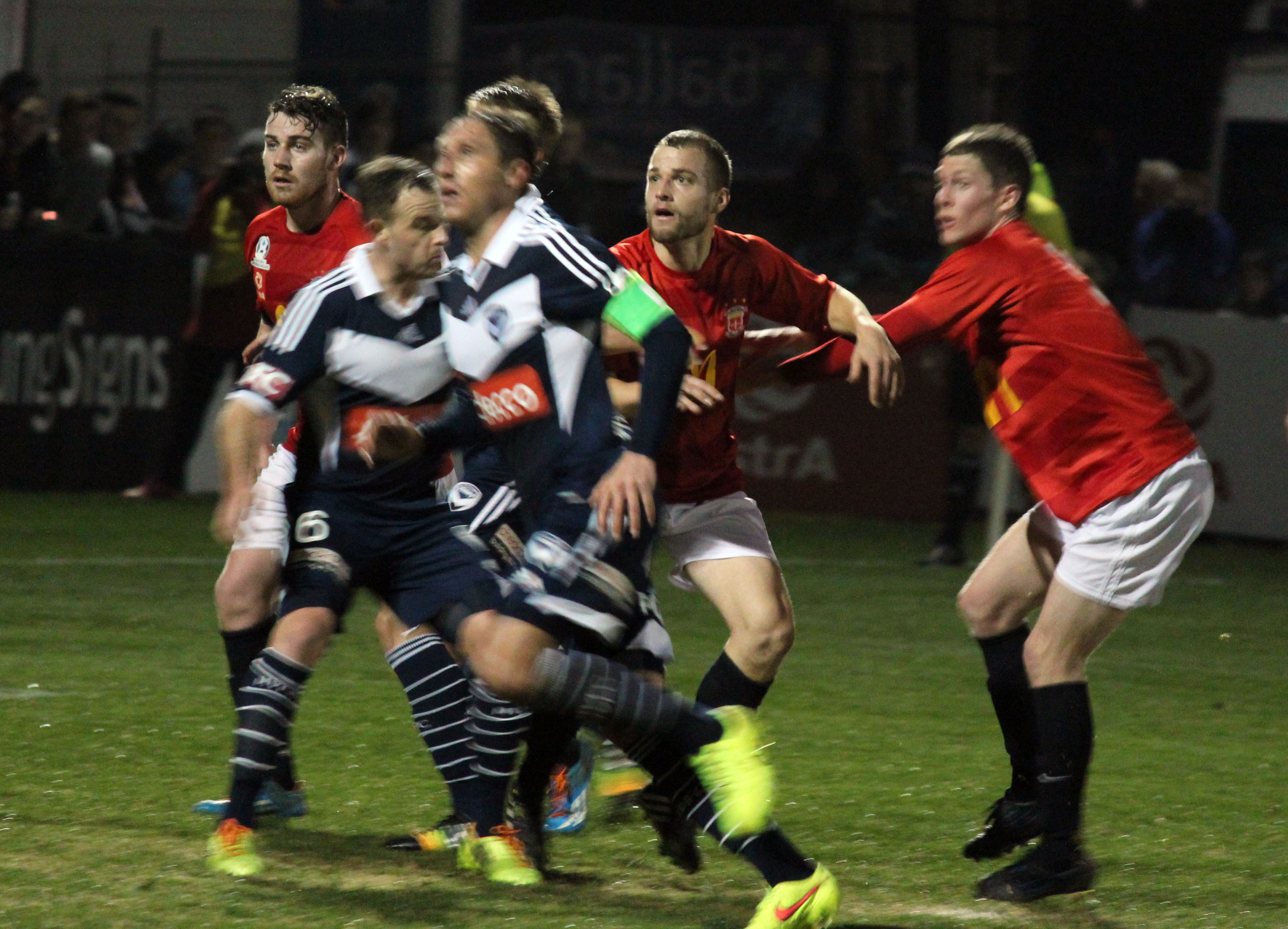
Ballarat Red Devils playing a friendly game against Melbourne Victory at Morshead Park in 2014.

On 13 February 2013, the establishment of the National Premier Leagues was announced. The league was designed to rebrand the Premier League in each state under a single national banner, and effectively create a national second division incorporating national playoffs. In December 2013, former Leeds, Perth Glory and Olyroos goalkeeper Danny Milosevic accepted the position of Director of Football. On 13 January 2014, Ballarat officially announced that it would be bidding for admission into the NPLV, and on the same day announced the signing of former Melbourne Victory striker James Robinson as player-coach. The FFV announced that Ballarat had won an NPL licence on 7 February 2014, and five days later announced that the Red Devils would be placed in the top flight of the two NPL divisions, effectively promoting Ballarat several divisions and into the highest Victorian level for the first time in its history.

Ballarat recruited former Liverpool defender Danny O'Donnell and attracted back several players with local origins, with the 20 man squad ahead of the inaugural NPLV season containing 15 players from Ballarat. Despite a skewed schedule owing to the construction of the Ballarat Regional Soccer Facility, Ballarat played their first home game in the stadium on 3 May 2014, losing 1–2 to South Melbourne. Their maiden season in the NPLV included wins against established top Victorian teams including Melbourne Knights, Green Gully, and Hume City. The Red Devils finished their own final game of the season away to Oakleigh Cannons safe from relegation, but minutes later a 95th-minute goal from Connor Reddan for Port Melbourne salvaged a 1–1 draw with Werribee City, saving both teams in that fixture from relegation at Ballarat's expense.

Ballarat Red Devils Logo used in the NPLV until September 2016

The Red Devils were placed in the Western Conference of the revamped NPL Victoria 2 for the 2015 season, while the club retained James Robinson's services with a two-year contract extension. Ballarat finished in 4th place in the NPL Victoria 2 West in 2015. At the FFV Gold Medal Night, goalkeeper Aaron Romein took out the NPLV2 Goalkeeper of the Year title while head manager James Robinson took out the NPLV2 Coach of the Year award.

In November 2015, head manager Robinson resigned from his post with the club naming Savas Saglam as his replacement on Boxing Day 2015. Ballarat went through a tumultuous off-season, with the majority of the 2015 squad refusing to train under new coach Saglam. It was reported that governance challenges, including disagreements between the Members Club and Investment Company, which jointly ran the club, led to the resignation of former manager James Robinson. The boycotting players stated that they did not support the Investment Company, which appointed Saglam. At an Extraordinary General Meeting, the members appointed a new board to run the club and Saglam was sacked. With the new structure of the club appealing to ex-manager Robinson, he returned for a second stint with the Red Devils. Ballarat finished in 6th place in the NPL Victoria 2 West division in 2016. Michael Trigger top-scored with 11 goals.

On 7 September 2016, head manager James Robinson departed the Red Devils to take up an opportunity as head manager of the Brisbane Roar FC Youth side. Danny Gnjidic returned to the club to take over Robinson's role, making it his second stint at the club which he was at 2007–2009. On 30 November 2016, it was announced that Ballarat Red Devils would be disbanded and that newly formed entity Ballarat City FC would take the club's National Premier Leagues Victoria licence. Red Devils members voted to disband the club and form a new entity in September 2016.

In 2017, the club's first season as Ballarat City, the side finished in 7th place in the NPL2 West competition. The following season, Ballarat finished in 9th position in the league, just four points clear of the relegated Sunshine George Cross and the club's worst result since the introduction of the NPL Victoria. After the season, Gnjidic resigned from his role to pursue a career opportunity interstate. Ballarat re-appointed Robinson, after his two-year stint with Brisbane Roar FC Reserves, as its Director of Football. The 2019 season was a tough one for Ballarat. After its Round 2 victory over Whittlesea Ranges, City lost 14 games in a row. Ballarat finished the season in bottom place and was relegated from the NPL2 competition.

== Morshead Park Stadium ==
During 2013, the City of Ballarat Council matched a Federal Government investment of $2.675 million announced by then Prime Minister of Australia Julia Gillard in June of that year in a major upgrade of Morshead Park with a view to host training for National Teams in the 2015 Asian Cup, including new grandstands, lights and returfing the field to form the Ballarat Regional Soccer Facility.

From 2014 onwards, the home of the Red Devils was Morshead Park Stadium, also known as the Ballarat Regional Soccer Facility.

== Ballarat Championship years ==
Year	Division	Players used
1968	Victorian Metropolitan League Div 4	1. (Capt)Eddie Wood (20)(1), 2. Jim Bull (22), 3. Ivan Kuralja (22), 4. Les Ives (22)(1), 5. Robert McConnell (22), 6. John Tsatoras (22)(3), 7. Henk Bastra (19)(3), 8. Malcolm Peel (22)(3), 9. Hugh Rattray (22)(59), 10. Keith Davidson (18)(11), 11. Martin Vissers (22)(11), 12. Charlie Payton (3), 13. John Rattray (3)(2), 14. Miro Perovic (2), 15. Peter Shelton (1)(1) Coach Eddie Wood, Matches played ( ) Goals scored ( )
1992	Victorian Provisional League Div 2	1. Rick Romien (26), 2. Jamie Winton (17), 3. Hayden McErvale (24)(1), 4. Dave Gibson (16), 5. (Capt)Wayne McNeight (21), 6. Pat Kennedy (23), 7. Duncan Smith (20)(6), 8. Paul Baldock (16)(1), 9. Peter Sammut (26)(26), 10. George Horvatek (26)(9), 11. Andrew Burgess (22)(9), 12. Nick Karametis (16)(9), 13. Lyndon Glare (25), 14. Dave Waithman (14)(3), 15. Nick Ravenscroft (12) Coach Jim Bull, Matches played ( ) Goals scored ( )
2007	Victorian State League 3 Nth-West	1. Rick Jannsen (22), 3. Wayne Dejong (1), 6. Alessandro DiGirolamo (17)(8), 7. Luke Armstrong (21), 8. (Capt)Josh Romein (21)(10), 9. Paul McClounan (5), 10. Moises Cociuba(2), 11. Sam Muscat (21), 14. Jonathon Davey (10)(2), 15. Dom Swinton (20)(5), 16. Ryan Rykers (22), 17. Shaun Romein (18)(8), 18. Sorin Mocan (1), 23. Tristan Romein (20), 25. Seb DiGirolamo (16)(3), 26. Ady Curtain (4), 28. Ashley Lymn (16)(12), 35. Luke Wigmore (22), Coach Danny Gnjidic, Matches played ( ) Goals scored ( )

== See also ==
Football Victoria Greater Ballarat
