= Yamba FC =

Yamba Football Club
- Full name: Yamba Breakers Football Club
- Nickname: 'Breakers'
- Founded: 1985
- Ground: Yamba Sporting Complex, Angourie Road, Yamba
- League: North Coast Football League

The Yamba Football Club (originally Yamba Soccer Club) is an amateur football club from Yamba, Australia. The club competes in the North Coast Football League.

== History ==
Founded in 1985, Yamba F.C. was predominantly junior player focused until the club's first senior title in 1993. The senior team continued to improve and made an appearance in the league's premier division in 2010 before being relegated again.

The club's home colours have traditionally been yellow and black (the traditional colours of the Yamba Surf Life Saving Club), black shorts and black socks, although over the years home colours have varied to include all-white.

Recently the growth of the club has put pressure on the committee members, who are all volunteers, and they have been seeking new people to take on the responsibilities.
