= Football Victoria Latrobe Valley =

Regional association football competition in Victoria, Australia

- Founded: 1951 (as Latrobe Valley Soccer League)
- Country: Australia
- Divisions: Senior Men's, Senior Women's, Juniors, MiniRoos
- Number of clubs: 13 (2026)
- Level on pyramid: Level 10 on Australian soccer league system
- Website: Official website
- Current: 2026 Football Victoria Latrobe Valley season

Football Victoria Latrobe Valley (formerly the Latrobe Valley Soccer League) is the regional governing body for soccer in Latrobe Valley districts in Victoria, Australia. It is one of Australia's oldest continuous regional soccer competitions, tracing its origins back to 1951.

== Member clubs ==
| Club | Founded | Reserve/location |
|---|---|---|
| Churchill United SC | 1969 | Hazelwood South Reserve, Hazelwood South / Churchill, |
| East Gippsland United FC | 2009 | Bairnsdale |
| Falcons 2000 SC | 1961 | Latrobe City Stadium, Morwell |
| Fortuna 60 SC | 1960 | Morwell |
| Gippsland United FC | 2022 | Warragul |
| Moe United SC | 1952 | Moe |
| Monash Wolves SC | 1958 | Newborough |
| Morwell Pegasus SC | 1959 | Morwell |
| Newborough-Yallourn United SC | 1923 and 1955 | Newborough |
| Sale United FC | 1974 | Sale |
| Traralgon City SC | 1968 | Traralgon |
| Traralgon Olympians SC | 1980 | Traralgon |
| Tyers Lightning SC | 1982 | Tyers |

== Life members ==
Life members of Latrobe Valley Soccer League (LVSL) or Football Victoria.

- Pastor Norman Minor (1953)
- Lou Adrichem (1975)
- John Halkett (1975)
- Ron Steel (2011)
- Luke Cheney (2011)
- John Hutchinson (2011)
- Tom Thompson (2012)
- Peter Albanese (2022)
- Allan Roberts (2023)
- Madelaine Breakspear (2026)
- John (Jack) Wandermaker
- Nancy Bosma
- Dick Bosma
- Don Di Fabrizio
- Ken Steel

== See also ==
- Soccer in Victoria
- Football Victoria
- Victorian Regional Leagues
