= Colac =

Colac can refer to:

- Colac, Victoria, a town in Australia
  - City of Colac, a former local-government area in Victoria, Australia
  - Shire of Colac, a former local-government area in Victoria, Australia
  - Shire of Colac Otway, a current local-government area in Victoria, Australia
  - Colac Botanic Gardens, in Colac, Australia
  - Colac railway station, in Colac, Australia
- Lake Colac in Victoria, Australia
- Colac (mountain), in the Italian Dolomites
- Colac Bay, New Zealand
- HMAS Colac, a ship of the Royal Australian Navy
- Kalach (food), spelled colac in Romania, traditional East Slavic bread, also common in Hungary, Romania, and Serbia
