= Football Victoria =

Governing body for soccer in Victoria

- Sport: Association football
- Jurisdiction: Victoria, Australia
- Abbreviation: FV
- Founded: 20 March 1884; 142 years ago
- Affiliation: Football Australia
- Headquarters: The Home of the Matildas
- Location: Bundoora, Victoria, Australia
- President: Angela Williams
- CEO: Dan Birrell

Official website
- footballvictoria.com.au

Football Victoria is the state governing body for soccer in Victoria, Australia. It is affiliated with Football Australia, the sport's national governing body.

== History ==
A meeting was held at the Young and Jackson Hotel by the Anglo-Australian Football Club on 28 February 1884 where twenty-five gentlemen were present to dissolve the club in place of the creation of a Victorian association after the formation of six or eight new clubs (Note: An article from The Age suggests six new clubs were set be formed. Articles from The Argus and The Leader suggest eight new clubs were set to be formed.) in various suburbs. A cup competition valued at £25 was also proposed. Clubs from Carlton, Richmond, South Melbourne, South Yarra, and Williamstown met at the Young and Jackson Hotel and all unanimously agreed to form the association as the Anglo-Australian Football Association on 20 March 1884. One week later, the rules were finalised and entries began for their inaugural cup competition; the George and George Challenge Cup.

In late 1890s, the depression had curtailed the growth of the game until it was restarted by Harry Dockery with the formation of 'British Association football' that culminated in 1909 Victorian soccer season. The Dockety Challenge cup started that same year.

The league was abandoned in 1916 due to World War 1, with estimates of 90 percent of players enlisting. The Victorian Amateur British Football Association (WABFA) would resume the Victorian Soccer League after the war in 1919 and would continue until 1952.

In 1956, the governing body was renamed the Victorian Amateur Soccer Football Association (VASFA) until it became Victorian Soccer Federation (VSF) in 1962. In 1958 the original Victorian Soccer League is dissolved and the Victorian State League is created.

In 2009, player registrations for soccer in Victoria passed 50,000, the highest number in the federation's history.

In 2018, the federation was renamed from "Football Federation Victoria" to "Football Victoria".

In 2025, Football Victoria assumed administrative control of the Victorian regional leagues and replaced regional associations with advisory panels.

=== Administration of game in Victoria ===
The administration of soccer in Victoria has been managed by Football Victoria under various names.

- 1884–1908: Anglo-Australian Football Club / Anglo-Australian Football Association
- 1909–1915: Victorian British Football Association
- 1919–1951: Victorian Amateur British Football Association (WABFA)
- 1952–1961: Victorian Amateur Soccer Football Association (VASFA)
- 1962–1999: Victorian Soccer Federation (VSF)
- 1999–2005: Victorian Soccer Federation (re-incorporated)
- 2005–2018: Football Federation Victoria (FFV)
- 2018–present: Football Victoria

== Competitions ==
=== Current ===
- National Premier Leagues Victoria Men's
- National Premier Leagues Victoria Women's
- Victorian Premier League Men's
- Victorian Premier League Women's
- Victorian State League Men's
- Victorian State League Women's

=== Regional leagues ===
There are separate regional leagues previously organised by associations are now administered by Football Victoria:

- Football Victoria Geelong (formerly Geelong Regional Football Committee)
- Football Victoria Gippsland (formerly Gippsland Soccer League)
- Football Victoria Greater Ballarat (formerly Ballarat District Soccer Association)
- Football Victoria Greater Bendigo (formerly Bendigo Amateur Soccer League)
- Football Victoria Latrobe Valley (formerly Latrobe Valley Soccer League)
- Football Victoria Shepparton
- Football Victoria South West (formerly South West Victoria Football Association)
- Football Victoria Sunraysia (formerly Football Federation Sunraysia)

=== Defunct ===
- Victorian Soccer League (1909–1957)
- Victorian State League (1958–1990)
- Victorian Premier League (1991–2013)

=== Tournaments ===
- Dockerty Cup
- Football Victoria Women's State Knockout Cup
- FV Community Shield
