= 2024 Capital Premier League =

Capital Premier League
- Season: 2024
- Dates: 6 April – 22 September 2024
- Champions: Queanbeyan City
- Premiers: Queanbeyan City
- Promoted: Queanbeyan City
- Matches played: 88
- Goals scored: 345 (3.92 per match)
- Biggest home win: Queanbeyan City 10–0 West Canberra Wanderers (1 June)
- Biggest away win: West Canberra Wanderers 0–6 ANU FC (15 June)
- Highest scoring: Queanbeyan City 10–0 West Canberra Wanderers (1 June)

The 2024 Capital Premier League was the third season of the Capital Premier League, a regional Australian soccer competition, based in the Australian Capital Territory. The season began on 6 April, and concluded on 22 September 2024.

== Teams ==
=== Stadiums and locations ===
Locations of the 2024 Capital Premier League teams
Locations of the 2024 Capital Premier League teams

Team	Location	Stadium
ANU FC	Canberra (Acton)	ANU Willows Oval
Belconnen United	Canberra (McKellar)	McKellar Park
Brindabella Blues	Canberra (Calwell)	Everlast Enclosed
Canberra Juventus	Canberra (Hawker)	Ainslie Fields
Canberra White Eagles	Canberra (Phillip)	Woden Park
Queanbeyan City	Queanbeyan	High Street Oval
Wagga City Wanderers	Wagga Wagga	Gissing Oval
West Canberra Wanderers	Canberra (Pearce)	Melrose High School

== Regular season ==
=== League table ===
Pos	Team	Pld	W	D	L	GF	GA	GD	Pts	Promotion, qualification or relegation
1	Queanbeyan City (C, P)	21	14	5	2	65	14	+51	47	Promotion to NPL Capital Football and qualification to Finals series
2	ANU FC	21	14	3	4	59	24	+35	45	Qualification to Finals series
3	Belconnen United	21	13	5	3	65	21	+44	44	Qualification to Finals series
4	Brindabella Blues	21	11	6	4	47	30	+17	39	Qualification to Finals series
5	Wagga City Wanderers	21	7	4	10	39	47	−8	25	
6	Canberra Juventus	21	6	2	13	24	50	−26	20	
7	Canberra White Eagles	21	3	1	17	16	69	−53	10	
8	West Canberra Wanderers	21	2	2	17	21	81	−60	8	

Source: Dribl
Rules for classification: 1) Points; 2) Goal difference; 3) Goals scored; 4) Head-to-head points; 5) Head-to-head goals scored; 6) Away head-to-head goals scored; 7) Least red cards; 8) Least yellow cards
(C) Champions; (P) Promoted

=== Results ===
Home \ Away	ANU	BEL	BRI	CJU	CWE	QUE	WAG	WES	ANU	BEL	BRI	CJU	CWE	QUE	WAG	WES
ANU FC		1–2	1–2	4–1	3–1	1–3	2–2	6–1		1–1			2–1	1–1	3–2	
Belconnen United	3–1		1–2	4–0	5–1	0–1	2–2	8–0			2–2	7–0		0–0		5–1
Brindabella Blues	1–5	1–1		1–1	8–0	3–3	0–1	2–1	0–4				1–0			5–1
Canberra Juventus	1–3	0–2	1–3		3–0	1–4	3–4	1–1	0–2		0–2					3–0
Canberra White Eagles	0–4	0–3	0–5	4–0		0–3	2–1	4–3			1–5	0–3			1–1	
Queanbeyan City	1–2	3–0	1–1	2–0	5–0		7–0	10–0			1–1	6–1	4–0		3–0	
Wagga City Wanderers	1–2	1–3	4–1	0–1	5–0	3–1		4–4		2–5	2–4	0–1				
West Canberra Wanderers	0–6	1–6	0–2	1–3	2–1	0–2	1–2		0–5				3–0	0–4	1–2	

Source: Dribl
Legend: Blue = home team win; Yellow = draw; Red = away team win.

== Finals series ==
=== Bracket ===
Semi-finals
1	Queanbeyan City	2
2	ANU FC	0
3	Belconnen United	0
4	Brindabella Blues (a.e.t.)	1

Preliminary final
2	ANU FC	2 (6)
4	Brindabella Blues	2 (7)

Grand final
1	Queanbeyan City	2
4	Brindabella Blues	0

=== Semi-finals ===
7 September
15:00

Queanbeyan City	2–0	ANU FC
Guerrero 59'; Tudehope 74' (o.g.)	Report

Kambah 2 Field 201, Canberra
8 September
18:00

Belconnen United	0–1 (a.e.t.)	Brindabella Blues
	Report	Cadavid Munoz 118'

Kambah 2 Field 201, Canberra

=== Preliminary final ===
14 September
16:00

ANU FC	2–2 (a.e.t.)	Brindabella Blues
Moore 68'; Rawlinson 107'	Report	Wilks 67'; Witrzens 120+2'
Penalties
	6–7

Deakin Stadium, Canberra

=== Grand final ===
22 September
15:00

Queanbeyan City	2–0	Brindabella Blues
Santrac 18'; Abot 83'	Report

Riverside Stadium, Canberra
