= 2014 Capital Football Federation Cup =

(Australian Capital Territory) 2014 Federation Cup
Tournament details
- Country: Australia
- Dates: 14 April – 20 June 2015
- Teams: 24

Final positions
- Champions: Belconnen United (4th title)
- Runners-up: Canberra FC

Tournament statistics
- Matches played: 23
- Goals scored: 112 (4.87 per match)
- Top goal scorer(s): Robert Schroder (5 goals)

Clubs affiliated with Capital Football in the Australian Capital Territory (ACT) - and surrounding areas of New South Wales - competed in 2014 for the Capital Football Federation Cup. Teams from the same Club playing in multiple divisions were allowed to compete. This knockout competition was won by Belconnen United, their 4th title.

It was originally intended by Capital Football that the 2014 Federation Cup would be the qualifying tournament to determine the ACT qualifier for the inaugural 2014 FFA Cup, however the competition was not decided until after the qualifier needed to be named. The previous winner instead qualified to the Round of 32 for 2014. As compensation, winning this competition also entitled Belconnen United to enter the 2015 FFA Cup preliminary rounds in the Fifth round, one round later than the other ACT NPL teams.

== Schedule ==
Region	Round	Main date	Number of fixtures	Clubs	New entries this round
ACT	Round 1	10 April-6 May 2014	8 + 1 bye	24 → 16	17
ACT	Round 2	13 May and 4 June 2014	8	16 → 8	7
ACT	Quarter-finals	12–17 June 2014	4	8 → 4	none
ACT	Semi-finals	24–26 June 2014	2	4 → 2	none
ACT	Final	3 July 2014	1	2 → 1	none

†–After extra time

== First round ==
17 teams from various divisions of the ACT State Leagues, including 1 Masters teams, entered into the competition at this stage. Matches in this round were played between 10 April and 6 May.

Tie no	Home team (tier)	Score	Away team (tier)
1	Belconnen (SL2)	1–2	ANU FC (SL4)
2	Queanbeyan City	0–2	Narrabundah (SL3)
3	Goulburn Strikers (SL1)	2–2 (5–6 (p))	Weston Molonglo (CLR)
4	ANU FC (CL)	4–0	O'Connor Knights

Tie no	Home team (tier)	Score	Away team (tier)
5	White Eagles	5–1	Gungahlin United (SL4)
6	Belconnen (SL1)	6–2	Gungahlin United (SL6)
7	Weston Molonglo (SL2)	2–1	Capital Football NTC
8	Weston Molonglo (Masters1)	1–2	Weston Molonglo (SL3)

- Byes:– Canberra City (SL1).

== Second round ==
7 Clubs from the ACT National Premier League (Tier 2) entered into the competition at this stage. Matches in this round were played between 13 May and 4 June.

Tie no	Home team (tier)	Score	Away team (tier)
1	Weston Molonglo (CLR)	2–3	Tuggeranong United (NPL)
2	Belconnen United (NPL)	7–1	Belconnen (SL1)
3	Narrabundah (SL3)	1–1 (4–5 (p))	Canberra City (SL1)
4	Monaro Panthers (NPL)	1–10	Canberra (NPL)

Tie no	Home team (tier)	Score	Away team (tier)
5	Canberra Olympic (NPL)	2–2 (3–1 (p))	Cooma (NPL)
6	Weston Molonglo (SL2)	13–0	Weston Molonglo (SL3)
7	ANU FC (SL4)	0–2	Woden Valley (NPL)
8	ANU FC (CL)	4–3	White Eagles

== Quarter-finals ==
Matches in this round were played on 12 June and 17 June.

Tie no	Home team (tier)	Score	Away team (tier)
1	ANU FC (CL)	1–4	Woden Valley (NPL)
2	Canberra Olympic (NPL)	3–1	Canberra City (SL1)
3	Tuggeranong United (NPL)	0–1	Belconnen United (NPL)
4	Canberra (NPL)	3–1	Weston Molonglo (SL2)

== Semi-finals ==
Matches in this round were played on 24 June and 26 June.

Tie no	Home team (tier)	Score	Away team (tier)
1	Canberra Olympic (NPL)	2–5	Belconnen United (NPL)
2	Canberra (NPL)	1–0	Woden Valley (NPL)

== Final ==
3 July 2014	Belconnen United (NPL)	3–2	Canberra (NPL)	Hawker Football Centre
	Mclachlan 13'; Wells 19'; Ugrinic 28'		Bernabo-Madrid 53'; Oloriegbe 85'
