= 2013 Capital Football Federation Cup =

(Australian Capital Territory) 2013 Federation Cup
Tournament details
- Country: Australia
- Dates: 6 April – 28 August 2013
- Teams: 34

Final positions
- Champions: Tuggeranong United (4th title)
- Runners-up: Cooma Tigers

Tournament statistics
- Matches played: 33
- Goals scored: 150 (4.55 per match)
- Top goal scorer(s): Domenic Giampaolo; Tim Anderson (5 goals)

Clubs affiliated with Capital Football in the Australian Capital Territory (ACT) – and surrounding areas of New South Wales – competed in 2014 for the Capital Football Federation Cup. Teams from the same Club playing in multiple divisions were allowed to compete. This knockout competition was won by Tuggeranong United, their 4th title.

Winning the 2013 Federation Cup also entitled Tuggeranong United to become the ACT's sole qualifier for the 2014 FFA Cup, entering at the Round of 32. The original intention from Capital Football was that the Federation Cup would be the qualifying tournament to determine the ACT qualifier, but match scheduling issues meant the 2014 winner would not be decided until after the qualifier needed to be named. To overcome this Capital Football announced that the 2014 winner of the ACT's pre-season competition was to be the ACT's qualifier in 2014, but Tuggeranong United successfully appealed to qualify them as the ACT's FFA Cup entrant for 2014.

== Schedule ==
Round	Main dates	Number of fixtures	Clubs	New entries this round
Round 1	6 April 2013	10 + 6 byes	34 → 24	26
Round 2	13 April 2013	8	24 → 16	none
Round 3	2–23 May 2013	8	16 → 8	8
Quarter-finals	20 June–3 July 2013	4	8 → 4	none
Semi-finals	25 July–1 August 2013	2	4 → 2	none
Final	28 August 2013	1	2 → 1	none

== First round ==
22 teams from various divisions of the ACT State Leagues, as well as 4 Masters teams, entered into the competition at this stage. Matches in this round were played on 6 April.

Tie no	Home team (tier)	Score	Away team (tier)
1	ANU FC Masters (-)	6–0	Queanbeyan City Masters 3 (-)
2	Queanbeyan City (5)	0–3	White Eagles (3)
3	Gungahlin United (6)	1–8	Queanbeyan City (3)
4	Tuggeranong United (3)	0–4	O'Connor Knights (3)
5	Senior NTC (3)	2–4	ANU FC (SL1) (3)

Tie no	Home team (tier)	Score	Away team (tier)
6	Tuggeranong United (5)	6–1	Palerang United (10)
7	Weston Molonglo Masters 1 (-)	1–2	Narrabundah (3)
8	Canberra (SL1) (3)	4–2	Weston Creek (4)
9	Weston Molonglo (SL4) (6)	0–1	Burns (6)
10	Weston Molonglo (SL6) (8)	4–1	Crossroads (11)

- Byes:–UC Pumas (3), Weston Creek (3), ANU FC (SL2) (4), Narrabundah (8), Gungahlin Juventus (5), and Gungahlin United Masters 2 (-).

== Second round ==
Matches in this round were played on 13 April.

Tie no	Home team (tier)	Score	Away team (tier)
1	Narrabundah (8)	4–3	ANU FC Masters (-)
2	White Eagles (3)	1–1 (6–5 (p))	ANU FC (SL2) (4)
3	Queanbeyan City (3)	6–0	Gungahlin Juventus (5)
4	O'Connor Knights (3)	1–0	ANU FC (SL1) (3)

Tie no	Home team (tier)	Score	Away team (tier)
5	UC Pumas (3)	2–0	Tuggeranong United (5)
6	Weston Creek (3)	7–0	Gungahlin United Masters 2 (-)
7	Canberra (SL1) (3)	2–1	Narrabundah (3)
8	Burns (6)	5–1	Weston Molonglo (SL6) (8)

== Third round ==
8 Clubs from the ACT National Premier League (Tier 2) entered into the competition at this stage. Matches in this round were played between 2–23 May.

Tie no	Home team (tier)	Score	Away team (tier)
1	Tuggeranong United (NPL) (2)	6–0	Narrabundah (8)
2	Canberra Olympic (NPL) (2)	2–2 (5–4 (p))	White Eagles (3)
3	Woden Valley (NPL) (2)	2–1	Queanbeyan City (3)
4	O'Connor Knights (3)	1–0	UC Pumas (3)

Tie no	Home team (tier)	Score	Away team (tier)
5	Cooma (NPL) (2)	5–0	Monaro Panthers (NPL) (2)
6	Belconnen United (NPL) (2)	5–0	Weston Creek (3)
7	Canberra (NPL) (2)	6–0	Canberra City (NPL) (2)
8	Canberra (SL1) (3)	2–1	Burns (6)

== Quarter-finals ==
All matches in this round were completed by 3 July.

Tie no	Home team (tier)	Score	Away team (tier)
1	Belconnen United (NPL) (2)	2–3	Cooma (NPL) (2)
2	Canberra Olympic (NPL) (2)	1–3	Tuggeranong United (NPL) (2)
3	O'Connor Knights (3)	0–6	Woden Valley (NPL) (2)
4	Canberra (SL1) (3)	0–8	Canberra (NPL) (2)

== Semi-finals ==
Matches in this round were played between 25 July and 1 August.

Tie no	Home team (tier)	Score	Away team (tier)
1	Cooma (NPL) (2)	3–2	Canberra (NPL) (2)
2	Tuggeranong United (NPL) (2)	0–0 (3–2 (p))	Woden Valley (NPL) (2)

== Final ==
The winner also qualified for the 2014 FFA Cup Round of 32.

28 August 2013	Tuggeranong United (NPL)	3–2 (a.e.t.)	Cooma (NPL)
