= 2025 National Premier Leagues Capital Football Men's =

National Premier Leagues Capital Football
- Season: 2025
- Champions: Tigers FC
- Premiers: Canberra Croatia

The 2025 National Premier Leagues Capital Football was the 13th season of the National Premier Leagues Capital Football (NPL), a regional Australian soccer competition based in the Australian Capital Territory. The season commenced on 5 April and was completed on 20 September. Gungahlin United were the defending premiers, and Canberra Croatia were the defending champions.

== Teams ==
=== Pre-season changes ===
| 2024 League | Promoted to league | Relegated from league |
|---|---|---|
| 2024 NPL Capital Football | Queanbeyan City | Canberra Olympic |

=== Stadiums and locations ===
Locations of the 2025 National Premier Leagues Capital Football teams
2025 NPL1 NSW based clubs

| Team | Location | Stadium |
|---|---|---|
| Canberra Croatia | Canberra (Deakin) | Deakin Stadium |
| Tigers FC | Canberra | AIS Grass Fields |
| Gungahlin United | Canberra (Harrison) | Gungahlin Enclosed |
| Monaro Panthers | Queanbeyan (NSW) | Riverside Stadium |
| O'Connor Knights | Canberra (O'Connor) | O'Connor Enclosed Field 1 |
| Queanbeyan City | Queanbeyan (NSW) | High Street Oval |
| Tuggeranong United | Canberra (Kambah) | Kambah 2 Field 201 |
| Yoogali SC | Griffith (NSW) | Solar Mad Stadium |

== Regular season ==
=== League table ===
| Pos | Team | Pld | W | D | L | GF | GA | GD | Pts | Qualification or relegation |
|---|---|---|---|---|---|---|---|---|---|---|
| 1 | Canberra Croatia (Q) | 21 | 17 | 0 | 4 | 82 | 26 | +56 | 51 | Qualification to Australian Championship and Finals series |
| 2 | Tigers FC (C) | 21 | 13 | 4 | 4 | 50 | 33 | +17 | 43 | Qualification to Finals series |
| 3 | Monaro Panthers | 21 | 13 | 3 | 5 | 64 | 24 | +40 | 42 | Qualification to Finals series |
| 4 | Tuggeranong United | 21 | 7 | 6 | 8 | 31 | 50 | −19 | 27 | Qualification to Finals series |
| 5 | Gungahlin United (W) | 21 | 7 | 4 | 10 | 36 | 60 | −24 | 25 | Licence withdrawn for 2026 NPL season |
| 6 | Queanbeyan City | 21 | 6 | 6 | 9 | 20 | 35 | −15 | 24 | |
| 7 | Yoogali SC (W) | 21 | 4 | 3 | 14 | 31 | 49 | −18 | 15 | Licence withdrawn at the end of the season |
| 8 | O'Connor Knights | 21 | 3 | 2 | 16 | 33 | 70 | −37 | 11 | |

Source: Dribl
Rules for classification: 1) Points; 2) Goal difference; 3) Goals scored; 4) Head-to-head points; 5) Head-to-head goals scored; 6) Away head-to-head goals scored; 7) Least red cards; 8) Least yellow cards
(C) Champions; (Q) Qualified for the phase indicated; (W) Withdrawn

=== Results ===
| Home \ Away | CCR | TIG | GUN | MON | OCK | QUE | TUG | YOO | CCR | TIG | GUN | MON | OCK | QUE | TUG | YOO |
|---|---|---|---|---|---|---|---|---|---|---|---|---|---|---|---|---|
| Canberra Croatia | | | | 3–0 | 9–1 | 6–0 | | 6–1 | | | | | | | | |
| Tigers FC | 2–1 | | 4–0 | 2–2 | 1–2 | | 2–2 | 3–2 | | | | | | | | |
| Gungahlin United | 0–4 | 1–2 | | | 2–1 | | 2–4 | | | | | | | | | |
| Monaro Panthers | 2–3 | 5–2 | 7–0 | | 5–0 | | 6–1 | 3–0 | | | | | | | | |
| O'Connor Knights | 1–4 | 0–4 | | 1–5 | | 6–0 | | 5–1 | | | | | | | | |
| Queanbeyan City | 0–2 | 1–2 | 0–0 | 2–1 | | | 1–1 | 1–1 | | | 2–2 | | | | 0–0 | |
| Tuggeranong United | | | 0–0 | 0–1 | 1–1 | | | 2–1 | | | | | | | | |
| Yoogali SC | 1–3 | 2–2 | 5–1 | | | 0–1 | 1–2 | | | | | | | | | |

Updated to match(es) played on 22 June 2025. Source: Dribl
Legend: Blue = home team win; Yellow = draw; Red = away team win.

== Finals series ==
=== Bracket ===
Semi-finals
1 | Canberra Croatia | 2
2 | Tigers FC | 3
3 | Monaro Panthers | 5
4 | Tuggeranong United | 1

Preliminary final
Canberra Croatia | 1
Monaro Panthers | 2

Grand final
Tigers FC | 3
Monaro Panthers | 0
