= 2004–05 NSW Premier League season =

NSW Premier League 2004–05
- League: NSW Premier League
- Sport: Association football
- Teams: 16

2004–05
- Champions: Bankstown City Lions
- Premiers: Bankstown City Lions

Statewide Cup
- Champions: Sydney United

NSW Premier League seasons
- ← 2003–04 2006 →

The 2004–05 NSW Premier League season was the fourth season of the revamped NSW Premier League.

Throughout the season many Premier League, Super League, Division One and Division Two teams competed in a newly formed FA Cup-style knockout competition called the Statewide Cup in which the Sydney United were crowned champions after defeating Belconnen Blue Devils in 3–1 at Parramatta Stadium.

== Changes from Previous Season ==
The number of teams increased from 12 to 16, with the inclusion of former National Soccer League teams following the abolishment of that league in favour of the restructured A-League. These teams included Marconi Stallions, Sydney Olympic, Sydney United and Wollongong Wolves. Manly United were also promoted from the NSW Super League. There was also a significant change to the format. The competition was divided into two stages. The first stage consisted of fifteen rounds with each of the sixteen teams playing each other once. The top eight sides would enter the Champions League and the bottom sides the Challengers League. All eight teams in each league would play a further seven matches against those from their league. All points accrued from the first stage would be retained for the second stage to determine the final table positions. Positions one to four from the Champions League and the highest ranked from the Challengers League would compete in the finals series. The bottom three teams in the Challengers League were relegated for the 2006 NSW Super League season.

== Teams ==
Teams relegated from National Soccer League:
(After the end of the 2003–04 season)

- Marconi Stallions
- Sydney Olympic
- Sydney United
- Wollongong Wolves

Teams promoted from Super League:
(After the end of the 2004 season.)

- Manly United FC

Teams relegated to Super League:
(After the end of the 2003–04 season.)

- Canterbury-Marrickville

== Teams and locations ==
Club	Ground	Capacity
A.P.I.A. Leichhardt Tigers	Lambert Park	7,000
Bankstown City Lions FC	Jensen Park	8,000
Belconnen Blue Devils	Belconnen Soccer Centre	2,000
Blacktown City Demons FC	Fairfax Community Stadium	7,500
Bonnyrigg White Eagles FC	Bonnyrigg Sports Club	10,000
Central Coast United		
Manly United FC		
Marconi Stallions FC	Marconi Stadium	
Parramatta Eagles	Melita Stadium	10,000
Penrith Nepean United FC	CUA Stadium	21,000
Rockdale City Suns	Rockdale Ilinden Sports Centre	5,000
St George FC	St George Stadium	15,000
Sydney Crescent Star	Lidcombe Oval	
Sydney Olympic FC	Belmore Sports Ground	
Sydney United FC	Edensor Park	
Wollongong Wolves	WIN Stadium	

== Regular season ==
=== League table ===
==== Champions League ====
Pos	Team	Pld	W	D	L	GF	GA	GD	Pts	Qualification
1	Bankstown City (C)	22	13	6	3	38	28	+10	45	Qualified for the Championship Finals series
2	Bonnyrigg White Eagles	22	13	3	6	47	30	+17	42	Qualified for the Championship Finals series
3	Blacktown City Demons	22	13	2	7	41	39	+2	41	Qualified for the Championship Finals series
4	Sydney United	22	10	7	5	44	30	+14	37	Qualified for the Championship Finals series
5	Sydney Olympic	22	11	4	7	41	27	+14	37	
6	APIA Leichhardt Tigers	22	9	4	9	25	29	−4	31	
7	St George Saints	22	7	7	8	30	31	−1	28	
8	Rockdale City Suns	22	7	5	10	28	33	−5	26	

Source: SoccerAust
Rules for classification: 1) points; 2) goal difference; 3) number of goals scored.
(C) Champions

==== Challengers League ====
Pos	Team	Pld	W	D	L	GF	GA	GD	Pts	Qualification or relegation
1	Belconnen Blue Devils	22	9	7	6	46	34	+12	34	Qualified for the Championship Finals series
2	Marconi Stallions	22	8	7	7	32	29	+3	31	
3	Wollongong Wolves	22	9	4	9	34	32	+2	31	
4	Manly United	22	7	7	8	33	29	+4	28	
5	Central Coast United	22	7	3	12	41	33	+8	24	
6	Penrith Nepean United (R)	22	6	5	11	32	44	−12	23	
7	Parramatta Eagles (R)	22	6	5	11	27	43	−16	23	
8	Sydney Crescent Star (R)	22	1	4	17	23	71	−48	7	

Source: SoccerAust
Rules for classification: 1) points; 2) goal difference; 3) number of goals scored.
(R) Relegated

== Finals series ==
Qualifying Finals
2	Bonnyrigg	5
3	Blacktown City	1
4	Sydney United	2(6)
5	Belconnen (p)	2(7)

Semi-finals
1	Bankstown City (p)	1(5)
2	Bonnyrigg	1(4)
3	Blacktown City	1
Belconnen	2

Preliminary final
2	Bonnyrigg (a.e.t.)	2
Belconnen	1

Grand final
1	Bankstown City	3
2	Bonnyrigg	1

=== Week 1 Finals ===
4 June 2005 Qualifying Final	Bonnyrigg White Eagles	5–1	Blacktown City Demons	Sydney, New South Wales
Friday	M. Simonovic 5'; T. Martin 41'; V. Tomasevic 45' (pen.); T. Devrimol 60'; B. Conde 90+2'	Report	L. Roodenburg 55'	Stadium: Bonnyrigg Sports Club

5 June 2005 Elimination final	Sydney United	2–2 (a.e.t.) (6–7 p)	Belconnen Blue Devils	Sydney, New South Wales
Saturday	P. Cardozo 18'; Glavas 48'	Report	D. Macor 53'; D. Wells 82'	Stadium: Edensor Park

=== Semi-finals ===
11 June 2005 Minor semi-final	Blacktown City Demons	1–2	Belconnen Blue Devils	Sydney, New South Wales
Saturday	J. Maguire 22'	Report	D. Wells 4'; P. Ivanic 61'	Stadium: Fairfax Community Stadium

12 June 2005 Major semi-final	Bankstown City Lions	1–1 (a.e.t.) (5–4 p)	Bonnyrigg White Eagles	Sydney, New South Wales
Sunday	M. Hoenselaars 20'	Report	V. Tomasevic 52'	Stadium: Jensen Park

=== Preliminary final ===
18 June 2005	Bonnyrigg White Eagles	2–1 (a.e.t.)	Belconnen Blue Devils	Sydney, New South Wales
Saturday	W. Heath 100'; T. Martin 103'	Report	M. Katz 117'	Stadium: Bonnyrigg Sports Club

=== Grand final ===
26 June 2005	Bankstown City Lions	3–1	Bonnyrigg White Eagles	Sydney, New South Wales
Sunday	P. Tsekenis 21'; Severino 54'; S. Babic 56'	Report	J. Bruni 76'	Stadium: Parramatta Stadium

== See also ==
- NSW Premier League
- Football NSW
