= 2024 National Premier Leagues Capital Football Men's =

National Premier Leagues Capital Football
- Season: 2024
- Dates: 5 April – 21 September 2024
- Champions: Canberra Croatia
- Premiers: Gungahlin United
- Relegated: Canberra Olympic
- Matches: 88
- Goals: 314 (3.57 per match)
- Biggest home win: Gunaghlin United 9–0 Yoogali SC (23 June)
- Biggest away win: Canberra Olympic 1–6 Canberra Croatia (29 June)
- Highest scoring: Canberra Olympic 7–2 Yoogali SC (13 April); Gunaghlin United 9–0 Yoogali SC (23 June)

The 2024 National Premier Leagues Capital Football was the 12th season of the National Premier Leagues Capital Football (NPL), a regional Australian soccer competition based in the Australian Capital Territory. The season began on 5 April and concluded on 21 September 2024.

Gungahlin United were premiers after finishing three points clear at the top of the league. Canberra Croatia were the 2024 champions after defeating Tigers FC 4–3 in the NPL Capital Grand Final.

== Teams ==
=== Stadiums and locations ===
Locations of the 2024 National Premier Leagues Capital Football teams
Locations of the 2024 National Premier Leagues Capital Football teams

Team	Location	Stadium
Canberra Croatia	Canberra (Deakin)	Deakin Stadium
Canberra Olympic	Canberra (O'Connor)	O'Connor Enclosed Field 1
Gungahlin United	Canberra (Harrison)	AIS Grass Fields
Monaro Panthers	Queanbeyan	Riverside Stadium
O'Connor Knights	Canberra (O'Connor)	O'Connor Enclosed Field 1
Tigers FC	Queanbeyan (Karabar)	AIS Grass Fields
Tuggeranong United	Canberra (Kambah)	Kambah 2 Field 201
Yoogali SC	Griffith	Solar Mad Stadium

== Regular season ==
=== League table ===
Pos	Team	Pld	W	D	L	GF	GA	GD	Pts	Qualification or relegation
1	Gungahlin United	21	15	2	4	55	25	+30	47	Qualification to Finals series
2	Canberra Croatia (C)	21	14	2	5	51	29	+22	44	Qualification to Finals series
3	O'Connor Knights	21	12	4	5	44	34	+10	40	Qualification to Finals series
4	Tigers FC	21	10	4	7	45	31	+14	34	Qualification to Finals series
5	Monaro Panthers	21	8	5	8	33	25	+8	29	
6	Tuggeranong United	21	7	5	9	31	34	−3	26	
7	Yoogali SC	21	3	2	16	14	63	−49	11	
8	Canberra Olympic (R)	21	3	0	18	27	59	−32	9	Relegation to Capital Premier League

Rules for classification: 1) Points; 2) Goal difference; 3) Goals scored; 4) Head-to-head points; 5) Head-to-head goals scored; 6) Away head-to-head goals scored; 7) Least red cards; 8) Least yellow cards
(C) Champions; (R) Relegated

=== Results ===
Home \ Away	CCR	COL	CTI	GUN	MON	OCK	TUG	YOO	CCR	COL	CTI	GUN	MON	OCK	TUG	YOO
Canberra Croatia		3–2	3–1	2–4	0–0	1–3	3–0	3–1				2–3	2–1		1–0	
Canberra Olympic	1–4		1–4	0–3	1–3	4–3	1–2	7–2	1–6		0–1					0–1
Tigers FC	2–2	3–1		3–0	4–0	1–1	1–1	2–1	2–3			0–3	3–0			
Gungahlin United	0–1	3–2	4–2		1–0	0–0	6–0	4–0		1–0				4–2	1–0	9–0
Monaro Panthers	1–2	3–0	3–1	3–0		1–2	1–1	0–0		4–0		2–2		2–3	1–1	
O'Connor Knights	2–4	2–1	3–2	2–3	1–3		2–1	3–0	2–1	3–0	3–1				2–2	
Tuggeranong United	3–2	1–0	0–3	2–3	1–0	1–2		6–0		4–1	2–2					3–0
Yoogali SC	0–3	3–4	0–4	2–1	0–2	1–2	2–0		0–3		0–3		0–3	1–1		

Source: Dribl
Legend: Blue = home team win; Yellow = draw; Red = away team win.

== Finals series ==
=== Bracket ===
Semi-finals
1	Gungahlin United	1 (4)
2	Canberra Croatia (p)	1 (5)
3	O'Connor Knights	1
4	Tigers FC	3

Preliminary final
1	Gungahlin United	0
4	Tigers FC	1

Grand final
2	Canberra Croatia	4
4	Tigers FC	3

=== Semi-finals ===
7 September
16:00

Gungahlin United	1–1 (a.e.t.)	Canberra Croatia
Olaoye 54'	Report	Vucetic 74'
Penalties
	4–5

Riverside Stadium, Canberra
Referee: Bruno Kehl
7 September
19:00

O'Connor Knights	1–3	Tigers FC
Paesler 39'	Report	Whithear 61'; Bailey 65'; Taneski 71'

Riverside Stadium, Canberra
Referee: Alexander McConachie

=== Preliminary final ===
14 September
19:00

Gungahlin United	0–1	Tigers FC
	Report	Popovich 21'

Deakin Stadium, Canberra
Referee: Nathan Shakespear

=== Grand final ===
21 September
19:00

Canberra Croatia	4–3 (a.e.t.)	Tigers FC
Barac 48', 94'; Colbertaldo 63', 108'	Report	McGregor 13'; Taneski 47'; Bailey 53'

Deakin Stadium, Canberra
Referee: Georgia Ghirardello
