= Dustin Wells =

Australian soccer player (born 1983)

Personal information
- Full name: Dustin Wells
- Date of birth: 31 May 1983 (age 43)
- Place of birth: Kiama, Australia
- Height: 1.80 m (5 ft 11 in)
- Position: Midfielder

Team information
- Current team: Belconnen United
- Number: 3

Youth career
- Belnorth
- AIS

Senior career*
Years	Team	Apps	(Gls)
2001–2004	Wollongong City Wolves	39	(1)
2004	Oțelul Galați		
2004–2005	Belconnen United		
2005	Sydney FC	0	(0)
2006	New Zealand Knights	6	(0)
2007	Wollongong City Wolves		
2008–2014	Belconnen United		
2015	Gungahlin United	14	(2)
2016–	Belconnen United	90	(24)

International career
2002–2003	Australia U-20		
Medal record
Representing Australia
Men's Association football
OFC U-20 Championship
Winner	2002 Fiji/Vanuatu
- * Club domestic league appearances and goals as of 9 November 2021

Dustin Wells (born 31 May 1983) is an Australian footballer who plays for Belconnen United in the National Premier Leagues.

== Club career ==
Wells joined National Soccer League side Wollongong Wolves from the AIS ahead of the 2001–02 season, aged eighteen. He was immediately selected as part of Wollongong's first-team squad and became a frequent starter by the end of the season.

In September 2004, Wells trialled for Romanian club Dinamo București, along with fellow Australian Ryan Griffiths. After Wells was not signed by Dinamo, he was reportedly signed by another Romanian side, Oțelul Galați, on a three-month contract with an option for a further two-and-a-half years. However, international clearance for the transfer was not received, with Wells' former club reportedly requesting a transfer fee which Oțelul were unwilling to pay.

In November 2005, Wells was included in Sydney FC's squad for the 2005 FIFA Club World Championship, one of four players selected from outside of Sydney's squad for the 2005–06 A-League.

Wells signed a short-term contract with A-League side New Zealand Knights in November 2006, as an injury replacement for Richard Johnson. The signing was criticised by Sydney FC and New Zealand player Jeremy Brockie, who suggested the Knights should have signed a local player instead. Wells made his A-League debut for the Knights on 5 November 2006 against Queensland Roar, setting up the only goal of the game in the Knights' first win in nine matches. Wells' contract with the Knights expired in December 2006, having made six A-League appearances.

== International career ==
He has also represented Australia at Schoolboys and Young Socceroos (U20s) levels. He was a member of the Australia team at the 2003 FIFA World Youth Championship.

== Honours ==
Belconnen United

- ACT Premier League regular season: 2012
- Capital Football Federation Cup: 2014

Australia U-20

- OFC U-19 Men's Championship: 2002

Individual

- ACT Premier League player of the season: 2010, 2011, 2012
- ACT Premier League top-goalscorer: 2011, 2012
- Capital Football All-Star: 2018, 2022
- Weston MVP, Masters Tournament 2023
