= 2021 Capital Football season =

(Australian Capital Territory) Capital Football
- Season: 2021
- Champions: not awarded
- Federation Cup: Tigers FC
- Premiers: Tigers FC

The 2021 Capital Football season was the 68th season in Capital Football. The season commenced 10 April 2021.

The season was suspended from August from government-imposed lockdowns, due to the impacts from the COVID-19 pandemic in Australia and cancelled in September.

Tigers FC were the NPL1 Premiers (based on a points per match formula rather than aggregate points), and qualified for the 2021 National Premier Leagues final series; they were also the Federation Cup winner, and qualified for the 2021 FFA Cup.

== 2021 National Premier Leagues Capital Football ==
(Australian Capital Territory) National Premier Leagues
- Season: 2021
- Dates: 7 March 2021 — 11 August 2021
- Champions: not awarded
- Premiers: Tigers FC
- Matches: 88

NPL 1 is the ACT’s highest senior men’s division. After the season was cancelled, a points per match formula was applied to award Tigers FC as the Premiers, and to relegate Tuggeranong United. The NPL Premier normally qualifies for the national NPL finals series, but the 2021 National Premier Leagues finals series was cancelled.

Pos	Team	Pld	W	D	L	GF	GA	GD	Pts	PPG	Qualification or relegation
1	Tigers FC	16	11	3	2	33	17	+16	36	2.25	
2	Canberra Croatia	17	11	0	6	37	22	+15	33	1.94	
3	Gungahlin United	16	7	5	4	33	22	+11	26	1.63	
4	Monaro Panthers	17	7	4	6	28	28	0	25	1.47	
5	Belconnen United	17	6	5	6	21	24	−3	23	1.35	
6	West Canberra Wanderers	17	6	1	10	20	35	−15	19	1.12	
7	Canberra Olympic	17	5	3	9	29	37	−8	18	1.06	
8	Tuggeranong United (R)	17	0	7	10	15	31	−16	7	0.41	Relegation to the 2022 ACT NPL 2

Source: mygameday
Rules for classification: 1) points; 2) goal difference; 3) number of goals scored.
Notes: final season positions decided on points per game.
(R) Relegated

== 2021 National Premier Leagues Capital Football 2 ==
(Australian Capital Territory) NPL Capital Football 2
- Season: 2021
- Champions: not awarded
- Premiers: O'Connor Knights
- Matches: 88

2021 was the second season of NPL 2 as the ACT’s second senior men’s division. After the season was cancelled, a points per match formula was applied to award O'Connor Knights as the Premiers, securing promotion to the 2022 NPL 1 competition.

Pos	Team	Pld	W	D	L	GF	GA	GD	Pts	PPG	Qualification or relegation
1	O'Connor Knights (P)	16	13	2	1	41	8	+33	41	2.56	Promotion to the 2022 ACT NPL 1
2	ANU FC	16	12	3	1	44	16	+28	39	2.44	
3	Queanbeyan City	16	11	1	4	49	20	+29	34	2.13	
4	Canberra White Eagles	16	8	2	6	36	30	+6	26	1.63	
5	Yoogali SC	17	7	2	8	32	33	−1	23	1.35	
6	Wagga City Wanderers	17	4	0	13	23	67	−44	12	0.71	
7	Weston Molonglo FC	17	3	1	13	26	52	−26	10	0.59	
8	Brindabella Blues	17	2	1	14	24	49	−25	7	0.41	

Source: mygameday
Rules for classification: 1) points; 2) goal difference; 3) number of goals scored.
Notes: final season positions decided on points per game.
(P) Promoted

== 2021 Capital Football State League 1 ==
(Australian Capital Territory) State League 1
- Season: 2021
- Champions: not awarded
- Premiers: Weston Molonglo
- Matches: 93

The 2021 ACT Capital Football State League 1 was the seventh edition of the Capital League Division 1 as ACT's third senior men’s division. The season was cancelled in September, with a points per match formula was applied to award Weston Molonglo as the Premiers,

Pos	Team	Pld	W	D	L	GF	GA	GD	Pts	PPG
1	Weston Molonglo B	14	12	2	0	48	8	+40	38	2.71
2	UC Stars	14	10	1	3	48	21	+27	31	2.21
3	ANU FC B	15	10	2	3	49	26	+23	32	2.13
4	Belnorth FC	14	7	4	3	45	23	+22	25	1.79
5	Gungahlin Juventus FC	14	8	1	5	40	24	+16	25	1.79
6	Majura FC	14	6	4	4	35	29	+6	22	1.57
7	ADFA Vikings	12	4	1	7	16	30	−14	13	1.08
8	ANU FC C	15	3	2	10	30	40	−10	11	0.73
9	Monaro Panthers B	14	0	2	12	10	55	−45	2	0.14
10	Woden Valley FC	14	0	1	13	13	78	−65	1	0.07

Source: mygameday
Rules for classification: 1) points; 2) goal difference; 3) number of goals scored.
Notes: final season positions decided on points per game.

== 2021 Men's Federation Cup ==
(Australian Capital Territory) 2021 Federation Cup
Tournament details
- Dates: 7 March – 6 June
- Teams: 21

Final positions
- Champions: Tigers FC

This was the 58th edition of the Capital Football Federation Cup, which also served as the preliminary rounds for the FFA Cup in the ACT.

Tigers FC were the Cup winner, entering the FFA Cup at the round of 32. Entry to the competition was staggered, with NPL1 clubs entering the tournament in a later round.

== 2021 Men's Charity Shield ==
The annual ACT Charity Shield kicked off the 2021 Capital Football season. Money raised from the event went towards the Fortem Australia charity. The match was contested between 2020 NPL1 champions Canberra Croatia and 2020 NPL2 Champions Wagga City Wanderers.

27 March 2021	Canberra Croatia	10–0	Wagga City Wanderers
16:00		Report

== 2021 Women's National Premier Leagues ACT ==
(Australian Capital Territory) NPLW Capital Football
- Season: 2021
- Champions: not awarded
- Premiers: Canberra Croatia
- Matches: 88

2021 was the fourth season of NPL W, the highest tier domestic football competition in the ACT for women’s football. The season was cancelled in September, with a points per match formula was applied to award Canberra Croatia as the Premiers.

Pos	Team	Pld	W	D	L	GF	GA	GD	Pts	PPG
1	Canberra Croatia	17	15	1	1	77	14	+63	46	2.71
2	Belconnen United	17	14	1	2	76	14	+62	43	2.53
3	Gungahlin United	17	9	0	8	51	28	+23	27	1.59
4	Canberra United Academy	17	8	3	6	38	36	+2	27	1.59
5	Canberra Olympic	17	8	1	8	43	42	+1	25	1.47
6	West Canberra Wanderers	17	7	1	9	24	30	−6	22	1.29
7	Wagga City Wanderers	17	2	0	15	12	83	−71	6	0.35
8	Tuggeranong United	17	1	1	15	8	82	−74	4	0.24

Source: mygameday
Rules for classification: 1) points; 2) goal difference; 3) number of goals scored.
Notes: final season positions decided on points per game.

== 2021 Women's Federation Cup ==
(Australian Capital Territory) 2021 Women’s Federation Cup
Tournament details
- Dates: 14 March–6 June 2021
- Teams: 9

Final positions
- Champions: Canberra Croatia
- Runners-up: West Canberra Wanderers

Tournament statistics
- Matches played: 6

== 2021 Women's Charity Shield ==
The annual ACT Charity Shield was contested to kick off the 2021 Capital Football season. Money raised from the event goes towards a nominated charity, which in 2021 was Fortem Australia. Canberra Croatia and Belconnen United contested the Shield in 2021. The matchup was a replay of the 2020 NPLW grand final.

27 March 2021	Canberra Croatia	1–3	Belconnen United
18:30		Report

== See also ==
- Soccer in the Australian Capital Territory
- Sport in the Australian Capital Territory
