= 2020 Capital Football season =

(Australian Capital Territory) Capital Football
- Season: 2020
- Champions: Canberra Croatia

The 2020 Capital Football season is the 67th season in Capital Football. All NPL and grassroots competitions were suspended due to the impacts from the COVID-19 pandemic in Australia. The season resumed on 18 July.

== 2020 National Premier Leagues Capital Football ==
The 2020 National Premier Leagues Capital Football season, is the eighth season of the National Premier Leagues Capital Football in Australia. The regular season commenced on 18 July 2020, delayed due to the impacts of the COVID-19 pandemic in Australia. Promotion/relegation has been suspended for the 2020 season. The NPL Premier normally qualifies for the national NPL finals series, but the 2020 National Premier Leagues finals series was cancelled in July.

(Australian Capital Territory) National Premier Leagues
- Season: 2020
- Dates: 18 July – 30 August
- Champions: Canberra Croatia
- Matches: 32

=== League tables ===
After the first 7 rounds of the season, the teams were split into a Top and Bottom four, with teams in each section playing each other once, with all points and goals reset to zero. The two highest placed teams from the upper group qualify for the season's Grand Final, and two highest placed teams from the lower group qualify for a Playoff game.

==== Stage 1 ====
| Pos | Team | Pld | W | D | L | GF | GA | GD | Pts | Qualification or relegation (Note: Teams were split into two groups (Top Four and Bottom Four) after the first 7 matches.) |
|---|---|---|---|---|---|---|---|---|---|---|
| 1 | Canberra Croatia (C) | 7 | 5 | 2 | 0 | 17 | 9 | +8 | 17 | Qualification to Upper Table |
| 2 | Belconnen United | 7 | 4 | 1 | 2 | 12 | 7 | +5 | 13 | Qualification to Upper Table |
| 3 | Gungahlin United | 7 | 3 | 3 | 1 | 14 | 7 | +7 | 12 | Qualification to Upper Table |
| 4 | Tigers FC | 7 | 3 | 0 | 4 | 12 | 10 | +2 | 9 | Qualification to Upper Table |
| 5 | Tuggeranong United | 7 | 2 | 3 | 2 | 7 | 12 | −5 | 9 | |
| 6 | Canberra Olympic | 7 | 2 | 1 | 4 | 15 | 16 | −1 | 7 | |
| 7 | Woden Weston | 7 | 2 | 0 | 5 | 5 | 16 | −11 | 6 | |
| 8 | Monaro Panthers | 7 | 1 | 2 | 4 | 7 | 12 | −5 | 5 | |

Source: sportstg.com
Rules for classification: 1) points; 2) goal difference; 3) number of goals scored.
(C) Champions

==== Stage 2 ====
| Pos | Team | Pld | W | D | L | GF | GA | GD | Pts | Qualification or relegation (Note: Teams were split into two groups (Top Four and Bottom Four) after the first 7 matches in the first Stage.) |
|---|---|---|---|---|---|---|---|---|---|---|
| 1 | Canberra Croatia (C) | 3 | 3 | 0 | 0 | 9 | 0 | +9 | 9 | 2020 ACT Grand Final |
| 2 | Gungahlin United | 3 | 1 | 1 | 1 | 4 | 7 | −3 | 4 | 2020 ACT Grand Final |
| 3 | Tigers FC | 3 | 1 | 0 | 2 | 2 | 6 | −4 | 3 | |
| 4 | Belconnen United | 3 | 0 | 1 | 2 | 3 | 5 | −2 | 1 | |
| 5 | Woden Weston | 3 | 2 | 1 | 0 | 6 | 2 | +4 | 7 | |
| 6 | Monaro Panthers | 3 | 2 | 0 | 1 | 9 | 2 | +7 | 6 | |
| 7 | Canberra Olympic | 3 | 1 | 1 | 1 | 3 | 7 | −4 | 4 | |
| 8 | Tuggeranong United | 3 | 0 | 0 | 3 | 1 | 8 | −7 | 0 | |

Source: sportstg.com
Rules for classification: 1) points; 2) goal difference; 3) number of goals scored.
(C) Champions

=== Finals ===
| Grand Final |
| 1 | Canberra Croatia | 3 |
| 2 | Gungahlin United | 1 |

26 September 2020
18:00

| Canberra Croatia | 3–1 | Gungahlin United |
|---|---|---|
| Barac 10'; Keir 16'; Aimillo 74' | | Bernabo-Madrid 65' |

Deakin Stadium
Referee: Alex Twomey

== 2020 National Premier Leagues Capital Football 2 ==
(Australian Capital Territory) NPL Capital Football 2
- Season: 2020
- Champions: Wagga City Wanderers

=== League table ===
Each team played each other once for a total of 10 rounds, plus a finals series for the top 4 teams. Promotion/relegation was suspended for the 2020 season due to the disruptions to the season caused by the COVID-19 pandemic in Australia.

| Pos | Team | Pld | W | D | L | GF | GA | GD | Pts | Qualification or relegation |
|---|---|---|---|---|---|---|---|---|---|---|
| 1 | Yoogali | 8 | 7 | 0 | 1 | 30 | 9 | +21 | 21 | Qualification for the NPL2 Finals |
| 2 | Queanbeyan City | 8 | 6 | 0 | 2 | 18 | 11 | +7 | 18 | Qualification for the NPL2 Finals |
| 3 | Wagga City Wanderers (C) | 8 | 4 | 2 | 2 | 23 | 13 | +10 | 14 | Qualification for the NPL2 Finals |
| 4 | Canberra White Eagles | 8 | 4 | 2 | 2 | 19 | 12 | +7 | 14 | Qualification for the NPL2 Finals |
| 5 | ANU | 8 | 4 | 0 | 4 | 16 | 12 | +4 | 12 | |
| 6 | O'Connor Knights | 8 | 3 | 1 | 4 | 20 | 19 | +1 | 10 | |
| 7 | Weston Molonglo | 8 | 2 | 2 | 4 | 8 | 14 | −6 | 8 | |
| 8 | Brindabella Blues | 8 | 2 | 1 | 5 | 11 | 22 | −11 | 7 | |
| 9 | Narrabundah FC | 8 | 0 | 0 | 8 | 4 | 37 | −33 | 0 | |
| 10 | Riverina Rhinos | 0 | 0 | 0 | 0 | 0 | 0 | 0 | 0 | Withdrew |
| 11 | Southern Tablelands United | 0 | 0 | 0 | 0 | 0 | 0 | 0 | 0 | Withdrew |

Source: sportstg.com
Rules for classification: 1) points; 2) goal difference; 3) number of goals scored.
(C) Champions

=== Finals ===
Semi-finals
2 | Queanbeyan City | 1
3 | Wagga City Wanderers | 2
1 | Yoogali SC | 3
4 | Canberra White Eagles | 2

Grand Final
Wagga City Wanderers | 2 (5)
Yoogali SC | 2 (4)

== 2020 Women's National Premier Leagues ACT ==
(Australian Capital Territory) NPLW Capital Football
- Season: 2020
- Champions: Canberra Croatia
- Premiers: Canberra Croatia

The highest tier domestic football competition in the ACT is known as the ACT Women's National Premier Leagues (WNPL). Each team played each other once for a total of 8 rounds, plus a finals series for the top 4 teams. Promotion/relegation was suspended for the 2020 season.

| Pos | Team | Pld | W | D | L | GF | GA | GD | Pts | Qualification or relegation |
|---|---|---|---|---|---|---|---|---|---|---|
| 1 | Canberra Croatia (C) | 8 | 8 | 0 | 0 | 31 | 8 | +23 | 24 | WNPL Finals |
| 2 | Belconnen United | 8 | 5 | 1 | 2 | 36 | 5 | +31 | 16 | WNPL Finals |
| 3 | Gungahlin United | 8 | 5 | 1 | 2 | 16 | 8 | +8 | 16 | WNPL Finals |
| 4 | Canberra Olympic | 8 | 5 | 0 | 3 | 36 | 15 | +21 | 15 | WNPL Finals |
| 5 | Canberra United Academy | 8 | 4 | 1 | 3 | 21 | 15 | +6 | 13 | |
| 6 | Woden-Weston FC | 8 | 2 | 2 | 4 | 7 | 20 | −13 | 8 | |
| 7 | Wagga City Wanderers | 8 | 2 | 0 | 6 | 16 | 25 | −9 | 6 | |
| 8 | Tuggeranong United | 8 | 1 | 2 | 5 | 5 | 25 | −20 | 5 | |
| 9 | Monaro Panthers | 8 | 0 | 1 | 7 | 4 | 51 | −47 | 1 | |

Source: sportstg.com
Rules for classification: 1) points; 2) goal difference; 3) number of goals scored.
Notes:
(C) Champions

=== Finals ===
Semi-finals
2 | Belconnen United | 4
3 | Gungahlin United | 1
1 | Canberra Croatia | 4
4 | Canberra Olympic | 1

Grand Final
Canberra Croatia | 2
Belconnen United | 0

== 2020 Men's Federation Cup ==
2020 was planned to be the 58th edition of the Capital Football Federation Cup, however it was suspended and ultimately cancelled before any games were played. The preliminary rounds would have doubled as the Capital Football qualifiers for the 2020 FFA Cup, but that competition was also cancelled.

== See also ==
- Soccer in the Australian Capital Territory
- Sport in the Australian Capital Territory
