= Griffith FC =

- Full name: Griffith Football Club
- Nickname: Rhinos
- Founded: 2014
- Ground: EW Moore Oval, Griffith
- Capacity: 1,000
- Coordinates: 34°29′16″S 146°0′48″E
- Head coach: Gabriel Abdala
- League: None
- 2020: withdrew National Premier Leagues Capital Football 2
Home colours	Away colours

Former club crest (2014–2020)

Griffith FC was an Australian association football club based in the city of Griffith, New South Wales. The club was founded in 2014 as Riverina Rhinos and in 2020 Riverina Rhinos club rebranded to Griffith Football Club. They played a team under 18's, 16's 14's and 13's NPL Youth are now known as Griffith FC

== History ==
=== Foundation and early years ===
Riverina Rhinos were founded in 2014 as a junior club and competed in the NSW State League system. Originally the club was accepted into the NSW Regional League and Regional Conference for U12s - U15s where it competed for three years.

=== Move to NPL Capital Football ===
7 November 2016, Capital Football announced the introduction of Riverina Rhinos for the men's and boy's National Premier Leagues Capital Football for 2017 onwards. As part of the announcement, Capital Football CEO Phil Brown said the organisation was looking forward to having another strong club join the growing league.

18 November 2016, Capital Football CEO Phil Brown was questioned by the media regarding the introduction of Riverina Rhinos being linked to a secret proposition by the federation body to submit a proposal for a future Canberra based A-League team. The addition of the Riverina region to a Capital Football bid would significantly bring the bid closer to the one million people catchment benchmark that FFA chief executive David Gallop has supposedly set as one of the criteria for interested bids. Phil Brown confirmed the Riverina Rhinos will be joining the ACT NPL leagues system but rejected it was connected to a future A-League bid.

The Rhinos finished its first season in the NPL in 9th place in the league, two points above wooden spooners Monaro Panthers and eight points behind 8th placed Woden-Weston FC. Riverina did not qualify for the finals series. In 2019, The club was managed by the Griffith and District Football Association (GDFA), until their relegation following the NPL Capital Football 2019 season, when the management of the senior NPL2 teams was handed over to Yoogali Soccer Club, with agreement of Capital Football.

== Players ==
=== Current squad ===
As of 13 February 2017

Note: Flags indicate national team as defined under FIFA eligibility rules; some limited exceptions apply. Players may hold more than one non-FIFA nationality.

No.	Pos.	Nation	Player
1		SCO	Sean Bremner
2		SCO	Darren Bailey
3		AUS	Luke Congdon
4		AUS	Nathan Battochio
5		AUS	Jacob Donadel
6		SCO	Ally Macleod
7		AUS	Daniel Febo
8		AUS	Michael Perre

No.	Pos.	Nation	Player
9		AUS	Joe Preece
10		AUS	Jone Ralulu
11		ENG	Stuey Smeeth
12		AUS	Zac Fattore
13		AUS	Mitchell Woods
14		AUS	Gavin Wylie
32		ENG	Lewis Burton

== Season-by-season results ==
The below table is updated with the statistics and final results for Riverina Rhinos following the conclusion of each National Premier League Capital Football season.

Champions	Runners-up	Third Place	Promoted	Relegated

Riverina Rhinos Season-by-Season Results
Ref	Season	National Premier League ACT										NPL Finals	Fed Cup	FFA Cup	Top scorer	
Ref	Season	GP	W	D	L	GF	GA	GD	PTS	League	Finals	NPL Finals	Fed Cup	FFA Cup	Name	Goals
	2017	18	1	4	13	15	71	−56	7	9th	-	-	QF	-	Sean Bremner	3
	2018	16	5	1	10	20	39	−19	16	8th	-	-	2R	-	Artur Rattel	4
	2019	16	0	1	15	9	62	−53	1	9th	-	-	2R	-	Keith Jackson	4
