= 2003–04 NSW Premier League season =

NSW Premier League
- Season: 2003–04
- Champions: Bankstown City Lions
- Premiers: Belconnen Blue Devils
- Promoted: Sydney Crescent Star
- Relegated: Fairfield Bulls
- Matches: 138
- Goals: 407 (2.95 per match)
- Top goalscorer: Matthew Borg (19)

The 2003–04 NSW Premier League season was the fourth season of the revamped NSW Premier League.

The Belconnen Blue Devils took out the minor premiership on 47 competition points, after having a superior goal difference over second placed St George Saints. However, the Devils lost two of three games in the finals series, including the grand final 2–0 to Bankstown City Lions. Thus, the Lions were the premiers for the 2003–04 NSW Premier League season.

Throughout the season many Premier League, Super League, Division One and Division Two teams competed in a newly formed FA Cup-style knockout competition called the Continental Tyres Cup in which the Sydney Crescent Star were crowned champions after defeating Bonnyrigg White Eagles in a penalty shootout at Gabbie Stadium.

== Clubs ==
Teams promoted from Super League:
(After the end of the 2003 season.)

- Sydney Crescent Star

Teams relegated to Super League:
(After the end of the 2002–03 season.)

- Fairfield Bulls

Club	Ground	Capacity
A.P.I.A. Leichhardt Tigers	Lambert Park	7,000
Bankstown City Lions	Jensen Oval	8,000
Belconnen Blue Devils	Belconnen Soccer Centre	2,000
Blacktown City Demons	Fairfax Community Stadium	7,500
Bonnyrigg White Eagles	Bonnyrigg Sports Club	10,000
Canterbury-Marrickville Olympic	The Crest Reserve	
Central Coast United	Pluim Park	
Parramatta Eagles	Melita Stadium	10,000
Penrith Panthers	CUA Stadium	21,000
Rockdale City Suns	Rockdale Ilinden Sports Centre	5,000
St George Saints	St George Stadium	15,000
Sydney Crescent Star	Lidcombe Oval	

== Regular Series ==
=== League table ===
Pos	Team	Pld	W	D	L	GF	GA	GD	Pts	Qualification or relegation
1	Belconnen Blue Devils	22	14	5	3	47	26	+21	47	Qualified for the Championship Finals series
2	St George Saints	22	15	2	5	46	27	+19	47	Qualified for the Championship Finals series
3	Bankstown City (C)	22	12	2	8	40	33	+7	38	Qualified for the Championship Finals series
4	Blacktown City Demons	22	11	4	7	48	28	+20	37	Qualified for the Championship Finals series
5	Sydney Crescent Star	22	9	5	8	26	21	+5	32	Qualified for the Championship Finals series
6	Rockdale City Suns	22	8	6	8	34	36	−2	30	
7	Penrith Panthers	22	9	3	10	25	37	−12	30	
8	Parramatta Eagles	22	8	5	9	31	31	0	29	
9	APIA Leichhardt Tigers	22	7	3	12	24	36	−12	24	
10	Bonnyrigg White Eagles	22	7	2	13	33	39	−6	23	
11	Central Coast United	22	5	4	13	25	47	−22	19	
12	Canterbury-Marrickville (R)	22	4	5	13	28	46	−18	17	Relegated to Super League

Rules for classification: 1) points; 2) goal difference; 3) number of goals scored.
(C) Champions; (R) Relegated

=== Results ===
Home \ Away	API	BAN	BEL	BCD	BWE	CMO	CCU	PAR	PEN	ROC	SGS	SCS
APIA Leichhardt Tigers		0–3	2–2	3–1	0–1	2–1	1–3	0–3	2–0	0–1	1–0	1–3
Bankstown City	1–2		0–2	3–2	3–0	0–1	1–0	4–1	1–2	1–0	0–2	2–0
Belconnen Blue Devils	2–2	2–1		2–1	3–1	4–1	3–1	1–0	2–0	1–3	1–1	3–1
Blacktown City Demons	0–1	4–1	2–1		5–0	3–3	0–1	4–1	1–2	4–2	0–1	1–0
Bonnyrigg White Eagles	2–1	0–1	1–1	1–2		4–2	0–0	1–3	2–3	5–1	1–2	1–2
Canterbury-Marrickville Olympic	1–1	2–3	0–4	1–4	3–1		1–2	0–1	2–1	3–3	1–3	0–1
Central Coast United	0–2	2–4	1–3	2–5	0–5	2–2		3–1	0–0	0–1	2–3	0–3
Parramatta Eagles	2–0	3–4	2–3	0–0	2–0	1–2	3–0		1–1	1–3	2–1	0–1
Penrith Panthers	2–1	1–3	1–2	0–3	1–5	1–2	1–0	0–1		1–0	2–2	2–0
Rockdale City Suns	3–1	3–1	2–2	2–2	2–1	1–1	1–3	2–2	0–1		1–3	1–1
St George Saints	3–1	3–1	3–2	1–4	2–0	1–0	6–2	3–0	2–3	2–0		2–0
Sydney Crescent Star	2–0	2–2	0–1	0–0	0–1	2–0	1–1	1–1	3–0	0–2	3–0	

Updated to match(es) played on 9 May 2004. Source: socceraust.co.uk
Legend: Blue = home team win; Yellow = draw; Red = away team win.

== Finals series ==
Qualifying Finals
2	St George	1
3	Bankstown	2
4	Blacktown	2
5	Crescent Star	0

Semi-finals
1	Belconnen	3
3	Bankstown	4
2	St George	3
4	Blacktown	1

Preliminary finals
1	Belconnen
2	St George	1

Grand final
3	Bankstown	2
1	Belconnen	0

=== Qualifying Finals ===
22 May 2004 Elimination final	Blacktown City Demons	2–0	Sydney Crescent Star	Sydney, New South Wales
Saturday	J. Maguire 44'; D. Hokin 80'	Report

23 May 2004 Qualifying Final	St George Saints	1–2	Bankstown City Lions	Sydney, New South Wales
Sunday	A. Deur 85'	Report	R. Luksic 15'; M. Hoenslaars 80'

=== Semi-finals ===
29 May 2004 Major semi-final	Belconnen Blue Devils	3–4 (a.e.t.)	Bankstown City Lions	Canberra, ACT
Saturday	A. Castro 44', 69'; Z. Josevski 89' (o.g.)	Report	Z. Babic 40', 87'; Borg 54'; R. Luksic 93'

30 May 2004 Minor semi-final	St George Saints	3–1	Blacktown City Demons	Sydney, New South Wales
Sunday	G. Mendez 30'; S. Young 94'; C. Cevinni 98'	Report	D. Hokin 22' (pen.)

=== Preliminary final ===
5 June 2004	Belconnen Blue Devils	2–1	St George Saints	Canberra, ACT
Saturday	D. Macor 58', 78'	Report	G. Lagoudakis 84'

=== Grand final ===
14 June 2004	Bankstown City Lions	2–0	Belconnen Blue Devils	Marconi Stadium, Sydney
Monday	Saso Boskovski 65' (pen.); Lee Pietrukowski 72' (o.g.)	Report		Attendance: 5,000; Referee: Jonathan Streater

== Gold Medal Dinner ==
At the end of the season, Football NSW hosted the Gold Medal Dinner, where players, coaches and referees were awarded for their work throughout the Premier League season.

Award	Grade	Name	Club
Gold Medal Winner	First Grade	Illija Prenzoski	Belconnen Blue Devils
Golden Boot	First Grade	Matthew Borg	Bankstown City Lions FC (19 goals)
Goalkeeper of the Year	First Grade	John Crawley	Blacktown City Demons FC
Coach of the Year	First Grade	Chris Tanzey	Belconnen Blue Devils
Referee of the Year	–	Jonathan Streater	–

== See also ==
- NSW Premier League
- Football NSW
