= Canberra Juventus FC =

- Full name: Canberra Juventus FC
- Nickname: Juve
- Founded: 1953 (as Juventus SC)
- Ground: Gungahlin Enclosed Oval
- Capacity: 1,150
- Coordinates: 35.244°S 149.038°E / -35.244; 149.038
- President: Michael Sergi
- Head Coach: Nicolas Alcazar-Stevens
- League: NPL Capital Football
- 2025: 4th of 8 Capital Premier League
- Website: https://www.facebook.com/CBRJUVE/
Home colours	Away colours

Canberra Juventus FC (formerly Juventus SC and Gungahlin Juventus SC) is an Australian semi-professional soccer club based in Canberra. Juventus currently competes in the National Premier Leagues Capital Football with home matches played at the Gungahlin Enclosed Oval.

== History ==
The club was established by the local Canberra Italian community in 1953 under the name Juventus Soccer Club, inspired by the Italian club of the same name. Juventus competed in the ACT Division One and the Federation Cup in their inaugural season. The following year the club won the league, receiving qualification to the Australia Cup. They competed in the 1965 and 1967 Australia Cup, where they failed to progress past the first round.

In 1973, Juventus SC toured New Zealand between 30 September and 7 October. Juventus was one of the first sporting teams from the ACT to tour New Zealand. The club started the tour in Auckland at Newmarket Park with matches against Auckland and Auckland U23s. Juventus lost both matches 1–3 and 0–3 respectively. Juventus' second tour destination took the club to Muir Park in Hamilton to take on Hamilton AFC on 4 October. Juventus and Hamilton drew 1–1 with a goal from M Valeri securing the visitors a draw. 6 October, Juventus continued its tour in the New Zealand capital of Wellington when they faced off against Wellington City at Rongotai College. Juventus repeated its feats in Hamilton and secured a second 1–1 draw of the tour with J Campbell scoring for Juve. Juventus finished its tour on 7 October at English Oval in the city of Christchurch. Juve succumbed to a 2–0 loss at the hands of Christchurch United.

In 1997, Juventus Soccer Club established the Gungahlin Juventus Soccer Club to cater for the growing number of players in the Gungahlin region.

27 September 2002, Gungahlin Juventus expanded junior operations for boys and girls by incorporating a new separate association under the name Gungahlin Junior Soccer Club (ACT). The new association retained the traditional colours and style of the senior Juventus club.

25 January 2005, Juventus acted to align itself with the national naming scheme to attract a broader base of players for both seniors and juniors and changed its name to Gungahlin United Football Club. Some members were unhappy with this and founded a break off team called Gungahlin Juventus to keep tradition and started out in the second division.

In 2022 Gungahlin Juventus went through a rebrand to differentiate itself from Gungahlin United FC, so they changed their crest and name to Canberra Juventus FC.

== Juniors ==
Aside from the Mens First Grade team Canberra Juventus FC fields an U23s (reserve grade team) as well as teams from U18s-U12s which provide a pathway to the Mens First Grade Team.

Canberra Juventus also fields Miniroos teams from U4s-U11s.

== Players ==
=== Current men's squad ===
As of 4 May 2026

Note: Flags indicate national team as defined under FIFA eligibility rules; some limited exceptions apply. Players may hold more than one non-FIFA nationality.

No.	Pos.	Nation	Player
1	GK	AUS	Gabe Taurasi
4	DF	AUS	Nicholas Subasic
60	DF	ITA	Francesco Boscolo Moretto
11	FW	AUS	Adrian Macor ((c))
10	FW	AUS	Cristian Barresi
26	MF	AUS	Joshua Gaspari
25	DF	AUS	Jak Matić
21	MF	AUS	Luca Macor
9	FW	AUS	Aisosa Ihegie
16	MF	AUS	Luke Stevens

No.	Pos.	Nation	Player
14	FW	AUS	Dylan Barreto
15	MF	AUS	Nicholas Dahl
17	DF	AUS	James LaVella
2	DF	AUS	Nikola Popovich
28	FW	AUS	Nikola Perinović
29	FW	AUS	Zac Barbatano
35	DF	AUS	Thomas Cosentini
17	DF	AUS	Jasper Milin
7	FW	AUS	Tony Madaffari
38	DF	USA	Kalani Harris

== Notable Former Players ==
David Ruberto

Angelo Ruberto

Frank Barresi

Elliot Zwangobani

Nunzio Rinaudo

Dominic Rinaudo

Paolo Macor

Daniel Macor

Joe Campagna

== Club staff ==
=== Coaching department ===
All the CBR Juve NPL men's team staff for the 2025 season.

As of February 2026

Men
Position	Name
Head Coach	(Australia) Nicolas Alcazar-Stevens
U23 Coach	(Australia) Frank Barresi

== Juventus Honour Board (Past Members) ==
Old Juventus Board
Position	Name
Committee	(Italy) Dante Gaspari
Committee	(Italy) Michele Barresi
Treasurer	(Italy) Vince Ciano
Committee	(Italy) (Argentina) Carlo D'Ambrosio

== Club identity ==
=== Club name ===
Canberra Juventus has gone through a handful of club names during the course of its history since 1968. These naming incarnations are listed below:

#	Name	From	To
1	Juventus Soccer Club	1953	1996
2	Gungahlin Juventus Soccer Club	1997	2022
3	Canberra Juventus FC	2022	Current

=== Club colours and crest ===
Canberra Juventus FC' Logo is Based on Italian club Juventus FC and models its logo off of the black and white badge with yellow text that the Historic Juventus logo is. The clubs colours are the colours of Italian Juventus, Black and white.

=== Home venue ===
Juventus play at the Gungahlin Enclosed Oval. Historically Juventus have played in Mckellar, Forrest, Gungahlin and Ainslie.

== Honours ==
- ACT League Premiers and Finals Champions

Premiers (13): 1964, 1965, 1967, 1968, 1970, 1972, 1974, 1976, 1978, 1983, 1984, 1985, 2000
Runners-up (6): 1966, 1973, 1986, 2001, 2002, 2004
Champions (10): 1964, 1965, 1968, 1970, 1971, 1972, 1980, 1983, 1986, 2001
Runners-up (6): 1963, 1966, 1973, 1995, 2000, 2004

- Capital Football Federation Cup

Winners (8): 1965, 1966, 1967, 1968, 1988, 2000, 2001, 2003
Runners-up (7): 1969, 1972, 1978, 1985, 1986, 1987, 2002.

== See also ==
- List of sports clubs inspired by others
- Sport in the Australian Capital Territory
- Soccer in the Australian Capital Territory
