= Belconnen United FC =

- Full name: Belconnen United Football Club
- Nickname: Blue Devils
- Founded: 1970
- Ground: McKellar Park
- Capacity: 3,500
- Coordinates: 35°12′52″S 149°5′3″E
- League: NPL Capital Football
- 2026: 9th of 11
- Website: http://www.bufc.com.au
Home colours	Away colours

Belconnen United Football Club (formerly Belconnen Blue Devils) is an Australian semi-professional association football club based in the northern Canberra region of Belconnen, ACT. The Men's and Women's First Grade team currently competes in the National Premier Leagues Capital Football.

== History ==
=== Founding and early years ===
The Belconnen United Football Club was founded in 1970 as the Belconnen United Soccer Club. The football club has been based out of the north Belconnen suburb of McKellar since its inception during the establishment of the Belconnen district of Canberra in the 1970s. Belconnen has run youth and senior footballing programs from recreational to elite level since its establishment.

The Blue Devils first appeared in the top flight of ACT men's football (then known as the ACT Division One) in 1975. The club quickly set itself up as one of the top ACT clubs with a string of major ACT titles (15 in total) during the 80s, 90s and early 2000s. This included five league premierships, seven finals championships and three Federation Cups.

=== Move to NSW Premier League ===
In 2000, Belconnen United switched to the NSW Premier League and was renamed the Belconnen Blue Devils. Belconnen first competed in the NSW Premier League in the 2000–01 season. The Blue Devils competed in NSW top flight for five straight seasons before a dispute between the Blue Devils management and board of Football NSW resulted in the club losing its licence to compete in the competition from 2006 onwards.

During the club's brief time competing in NSW, The Blue Devils enjoyed success, reaching the finals series in each season post their first and becoming league premiers in the 2003–04 season, beating St George Saints to the title with a +3 goal difference over the South Sydney club. Belconnen started the finals series with a narrow 4–3 overtime loss at McKellar Park to Sydney club Bankstown City Lions in the major semi-final. This meant The Blue Devils had to compete in the preliminary final while Bankstown advanced straight to the grand final. Belconnen once again played host in the preliminary final against league runner-up and winner of the minor semi-final, St George Saints FC. The Blue Devils were victorious over St George with a 2–1 victory thanks to a brace to Belconnen striker Macor. The victory led Belconnen to reach the 2003–04 NSW Premier League Grand Final, held at Marconi Stadium, where the Blue Devils faced-off against Bankstown City Lions once again. In front of a crowd of 5,000 the Blue Devils succumbed to two-second half goals to lose the grand final 2–0. Bankstown were given a penalty in the sixty-fifth minute that was converted by Saso Boskovski before Belconnen player, Lee Pietrukowski, scored an own goal seven minutes later.

In the 2004–05 season Belconnen won the ‘Challengers League’ by three points over Marconi Stallions and Wollongong Wolves after the league split into two groups following the combined league section of the season. As such, Belconnen qualified for the 04-05 finals series along with the top four clubs of the ‘Champions League’. The Blue Devils defied the odds to beat former NSL club, Sydney United on penalties 2–2 (7–6) in the qualifying final and Blacktown City Demons 2–1 in the minor semi-final to reach the preliminary final. 18 June 2005, the Blue Devils took on Bonnyrigg White Eagles in the preliminary final held in Sydney. The match ended 0–0 after regular time meaning extra time was needed to split the two teams. The White Eagles’ scored twice in the first half of extra time to take a commanding 2–0 lead into the final fifteen minutes of the match. Belconnen scored in the one-hundred and seventeenth minute to set up a tense final few minutes, but the Blue Devils failed to score again, which resulted in a 2–1 victory for Bonnyrigg, who progressed to the grand final.

=== Return to ACT Premier League ===
In 2006, after separating with Football NSW, The Blue Devils returned to Capital Football in the ACT and were accepted back into the ACT Premier League. The Club was renamed Belconnen United Football Club, with Blue Devils reverting to being a nickname.

22 April 2006, Belconnen played its first match back in the ACT Premier League away to Canberra Olympic where United and Olympic played out a 1–1 draw. United finished the 2006 Act Premier League regular season as runner-up to Canberra Olympic by seven points. The Blue Devils qualified for the finals series where the club lost the major semi-final to Olympic 0–4 and the preliminary final to Cooma 1–2.

In 2007, Belconnen signed a mutual benefiting relationship agreement with A-League club Central Coast Mariners. The two clubs agreed to play an annual pre-season friendly match in Canberra at McKellar Park named The Bank of Queensland Cup. The agreement opened up opportunities for a development pathway for ACT talent to the A-League while the Mariners gained a foothold within the ACT footballing community. The agreement lasted five years with annual matches played between 2007 and 2011, starting with a 4–0 victory to the visiting Mariners on 30 June 2007.

Belconnen next won the Championship two seasons later in 2008. 14 September 2008, Belconnen met Canberra FC in the ACT Premier League grand final. Belconnen took a first half lead and were 2–0 up at half time before continuing the good form in the second half to secure a 4–1 victory for the club's first title since returning to ACT competition.

In 2012, Belconnen won the league premiership with a comfortable nine-point first-place finish over Cooma Tigers, who finished second. Belconnen also reached the grand final of the finals series but lost the match to Cooma 1–2 at McKellar Park on 15 September 2012. This turned out to be the last ACT Premier League Premiership title as the league re-structured in 2013 under the FFA national banner of National Premier Leagues (NPL).

=== National Premier Leagues era ===
Belconnen United was a founding member of the NPL ACT in 2013 following Football Federation Australia’s national re-structure of football leagues in Australia. Belconnen finished their first NPL season in second place, seven points behind league premiers Canberra FC. The Blue Devils lost the major semi-final to the same opposition 0–4 before succumbing 2–4 to Canberra Olympic at McKellar Park in the preliminary final.

Belconnen under head coach Dean Ugrinic and President Jaime Garrido repeated its second-place finish in the league ladder in 2014 but performed better in the NPL Capital Football finals series by winning the grand final and thus claiming the championship. United claimed the title with a 3–2 shootout victory over long-time rival Canberra FC after the two sides finished the match 3–3. 3 July 2014, Belconnen also added the Federation Cup trophy to the trophy cabinet with a 3–2 final win over Canberra FC yet again. The Federation Cup victory would normally mean Belconnen would qualify for the round of 32 of the FFA Cup but after a formal challenge was lodged by 2013 cup winners Tuggeranong United, Capital Football granted the 2014 qualification spot to Tuggeranong, meaning Belconnen missed out.

10 April 2015, Belconnen United FC president Jaime Garrido announced they had formed a formal relationship with A-League heavyweights Sydney FC. The agreement between the two clubs established a formal pathway for Belconnen youngsters to progress and gain the possibility of an A-League contract with Sydney FC. The increased level of promotion, combined with the pulling power of one of the A-League's most successful clubs, resulted in more than 1800 fans braving the cold to see the Sky Blues claim a 3-0 victory. Belconnen United president Jaime Garrido said he couldn't be happier with the club's relationship with Sydney FC and that the match had been locked in for next year. "When we approached Sydney FC chief executive Tony Pignata and put together the proposal, he was like, 'this is good', but words are one thing and actions are another," Garrido said. The agreement also opened up ongoing opportunities for Belconnen coaching staff to work with and information share with Sydney FC staff including Graham Arnold. Finally, Sydney FC agreed to tour Canberra in 2015 pre-season to host coaching clinics and play a friendly match against the Blue Devils. Belconnen lost the friendly match against Sydney 0–3 with second half goals to Andrew Hoole, Jacob Tratt and Matt Simon in front of 1,852 fans.

2 January 2017, Belconnen United entered into an mutual benefiting agreement with NSW NPL club Wollongong Wolves to co-host a "festival of football" in the South Coast town of Nowra. 28–29 January 2017, The two clubs played a number of women's and men's junior and senior exhibition matches, ran free all-ages coaching and refereeing clinics, training drills, player sessions and family activities at Nowra's Ison Park.

The men's First Grade team was relegated after finishing last in the 2022 season under Head Coach Michael Zakoski, Director of NPL Tim Malone and President Joe Carbone. The women's First Grade team continues on in the NPL after making it to the final four in 2022 under Coach Scott Conlon and Director of NPLW Football Hamish Cresswell. Socceroo Tom Rogic played for the club.

== Club identity ==
=== Colours and crest ===
Alternative BUFC crest with additional detail

BUFC's primary colours are sky blue and white, used for home kits, with dark blue used as a contrasting colour for away kits. The crest consists of the sky blue devil head protruding from a dark blue and white trimmed round shield. The more detailed version of the crest also includes the club's name of Belconnen United FC, the territory the club is from, ACT, and the nickname of the club, Blue Devils.

=== Feeder clubs ===
Belconnen United has established a number of feeder club agreements with junior and senior clubs in the ACT and NSW to help create a pathway for junior and senior players alike. Currently Belconnen United has four agreements in place.

Feeder Clubs
Club Name	Club Description
Belnorth Football Club	A junior and state league club based in the North Belconnen region, catering for over 1,000 children and adults from Kaleen, Giralang, McKellar, Evatt, Flynn and Melba
Belsouth Soccer Club	A junior club based in the South Belconnen region of Aranda, Bruce, Cook, Hawker, Macquarie, Page and Weetangera, catering for both boys and girls aged 4 to 18
Belwest Foxes Soccer Club	A junior and state league club based in Latham with a catchment encompassing Kippax, Latham, Holt, Scullin, Higgins, MacGregor, Charnwood, Florey, Page and Dunlop
Yass Football Club	United's regional affiliate, Yass FC is affectionately known as the Redbacks. The club was founded in 2006 in a grassroots movement which currently caters for 300 players within 40 junior and senior teams for both male and female players

=== Club anthem ===
Belconnen United have created their own club song.

=== Home venue ===
Belconnen United has always been based in the Belconnen suburb of McKellar, ACT. McKellar Park, formally known as McKellar Soccer Centre and Belconnen Soccer Centre, is the Blue Devils home venue and has been since its inception in 1970. McKellar Park went through a major renovation in 2002 with the building of a new grandstand and other amenities, transforming the once suburban ground into one of the premier association football stadiums in Canberra. The build cost was $1.10 million and was delivered on time by club partner Project Coordination. The venue was re-opened by former ACT Senator Margaret Reid on 23 November 2002. The first match played at the ground was a 2002/03 NSW Premier League match between Belconnen United and Bonnyrigg White Eagles, the match ended 2–2. McKellar Park now holds a capacity of 3,500 people with seating for approx. 600 people. The grandstand also contains a concession area, change rooms, public toilets, storage, moderate corporate areas and press facilities. Belconnen United ground share with W-League team Canberra United but because the W-League is played in the summer months and the NPL Capital Football league runs over the winter months, there is no overlapping in fixtures for use of the stadium.

=== Sponsorship ===
Belconnen United FC has always been financially supported by the licensed club, Belconnen Soccer Club. On 20 January 2017, the Blue Devils announced a new front of shirt partnership with multi-national gym company Anytime Fitness. Anytime Fitness would also host junior gala days during the junior season. In 2015 Club President Jaime Garrido signed partnership deal with Rebel Belconnen.

== Players ==
=== First-team squad ===
As of 6 July 2019

Note: Flags indicate national team as defined under FIFA eligibility rules; some limited exceptions apply. Players may hold more than one non-FIFA nationality.

No.	Pos.	Nation	Player
1	GK	AUS	Deakin Jewell
2	DF	AUS	Nicholas Subasic
3	MF	AUS	Michael Rinaudo
4	DF	AUS	Christian Pratezina
5	DF	AUS	Philipe Borgeaud
6		AUS	Sebastian Beltrami
7		AUS	Pietro Carbone
8		AUS	Luca Florez

No.	Pos.	Nation	Player
9		AUS	Jayde James-Ward
10		AUS	Samuel Whithear
11		AUS	Adrian Macor
12		AUS	Luca Macor
13		AUS	Michael Taurasi
14		AUS	Maxx Green
15		AUS	Nicholas Masters
17		AUS	Jacob Garner
20		AUS	Bruno Herrera

== Coaching staff ==
As of 15 February 2016

2016 Coaching Staff
NPL First Team
Pos	Name	Pos	Name
HC	(Australia) Dean Ugrinic	AC	(Australia) Luka Ujdur
NPL U20s
HC	(Australia) Marko Perinovic	AC	(Australia) Peter Mazis
NPL U18s
HC	(Australia) Joe Carbone	AC	(Australia) Frank Beltrami
NPL Specialised Coaching
GC (Australia) Paul Jones
Club President
CP	(Australia) Jaime Garrido		

== Honours ==
- ACT League Premiers and Finals Champions
  - Premiers (6): 1982, 1990, 1996, 1997, 1998, 2012
  - Champions (10): 1982, 1985, 1990, 1996, 1998, 2000, 2002, 2008, 2014, 2017
- Capital Football Federation Cup
  - Winners (4): 1990, 1992, 1998, 2014
- NSW Premier League
  - Premiers (1): 2003–04
  - Challenger League Winners (1): 2004–05

== Season-by-season results ==
The below table is updated with the statistics and final results for Belconnen United FC following the conclusion of each National Premier League Capital Football season.

Champions	Runners-up	Third Place

Belconnen United Season-by-Season Results
Ref	Season	National Premier League ACT										NPL Finals	Fed Cup	FFA Cup	Top scorer	
Ref	Season	GP	W	D	L	GF	GA	GD	PTS	League	Finals	NPL Finals	Fed Cup	FFA Cup	Name	Goals
	2013	23	15	2	6	47	33	+14	47	2nd	PF	-	QF	-	Dustin Wells	14
	2014	16	11	2	3	53	24	+29	35	2nd	Champions	-	W	-	Jason Ugrinic	14
	2015	16	10	4	2	38	24	+14	34	3rd	SF	-	RU	-	Aisosa Ihegie	8
	2016	18	11	2	5	49	24	+25	35	3rd	SF	-	SF	-	Jason Ugrinic	13
	2017	18	11	1	6	55	24	+31	34	3rd	Champions	-	2R	-	Jason Ugrinic	22
	2018	16	7	3	6	30	29	+1	24	5th	-	-	SF	-	Daniel Barac	8
	2019	16	8	2	6	34	26	+8	26	5th	-	-	SF	-	Michael Taurasi	6
	2020	7	4	1	2	7	5	+2	13	2nd	4th	-	-	-	Luca Florez	5
	2021	3	2	0	1	3	4	-1	6	4th	-	-	-	-	Luca Florez	5
	2022	21	4	4	13	25	50	-25	16	8th	-	-	-	-	Max Green	6
