= Tuggeranong United FC =

Tuggeranong United
- Full name: Tuggeranong United Football Club
- Nicknames: Tuggies, Tuggers, TUFC, United
- Founded: 1976
- Ground: Kambah 2
- Coordinates: 35°23′24″S 149°03′53″E
- Manager: Mitch Stevens
- League: NPL Capital Football
- 2026: 4th of 11
- Website: https://tufc.org.au/
Home colours	Away colours

Tuggeranong United FC are a Association Football club based in the southern Canberra region of Tuggeranong, ACT, Australia. The club competes in the highest level of football in the ACT, NPL Capital Football.

Tuggeranong United is one of the largest football clubs in Canberra with an extensive elite NPL pathway from U12s SAP to First Grade for both men and women. In 2025 the club was home to 118 recreational teams, including teams in the Men's Capital League, the Women's Capital League, the Men's Masters league, Junior Leagues and MiniRoos.

== History ==
=== Founding and early years ===
Tuggeranong United was founded in 1976 as Kambah United Soccer Club. The senior First Team competed in the First Division of ACT football while the club catered for both junior and senior players in the Tuggeranong Valley. The club was located in the Tuggeranong suburb of Kambah, the largest residential suburb in the Southern Hemisphere. In 1989 TUSC won its first major trophy, the Federation Cup. A knock out competition run in conjunction with the entire league, involving teams from across the top divisions.

In 1977, Wanniassa Soccer Club was formed as a specialist junior football club for youngsters from the suburb of Wanniassa and its environs.

1983. Kambah United won its first ever title with an ACT Premier League ‘City’ conference premiership. The club pipped Narrabundah and Concordia Phillip to the title by one point. However, the club lost the Championship Grand Final to the ‘Country’ conference winners West Woden Juventus 0–3.

In 1985 Wanniassa SC changed its name to Tuggeranong Soccer Club.

1986, Kambah United and Tuggeranong SC merged to create Tuggeranong United Soccer Club to give a united development structure between juniors and seniors for the region. Juniors would predominantly be located out of Wanniassa and seniors out of Kambah.

=== The glory years ===
Between 1989 and 1995 the newly united club from Canberra's deep south experienced a period of great success both on and off the pitch. Off the pitch, the club was connecting with the ever-expanding local community in a fashion the two separate clubs never could. Participation numbers went through the roof with registrations reaching well over 1,300 players each season. On the pitch the merged club started picking up its first titles.

In 1989, United won its first major ACT title, The Federation Cup (Fed Cup). The Fed Cup is the ACT's premier knock-out tournament contested each season since 1962 by the clubs in the top divisions in ACT football. Tuggies beat Canberra City Concordia in the cup final 3–0.

Continuing on this golden period, Tuggeranong won a Premiership/Championship double 1991. In 1992 Tuggers defended their Championship crown by beating Belconnen United in the grand final 2–0. In 1993, 94 and 95, the club added a further two Federation Cups to their trophy room while finishing runner-up in both the grand final and league in 1994 and runner-up in the fed cup in 1995.

=== The yo-yo years ===
The late 1990s and early 2000s saw the club go through a period of instability and turbulence. In 1997 after two years of poor performances, Tuggers were relegated to the second division (Premier League 2). In 1999, several former Tuggeranong juniors returned to the club with the goal of getting the club promoted. Tuggeranong beat O'Connor Knights 6–1 in the Grand Final in front of a large crowd and were promoted. The 1999 team is regarded as the clubs best ever home grown team, most of which were representative players. The team then backed up the Grand Final win with a Federation Cup runners up result six months later. The club then performed reasonably in the top flight for four seasons before again getting relegated in 2005. The club spent one season in Division 1 (second division) but a good season ended with the club promoted back into the Premier League in 2006.

=== Consolidation and stability ===
Since 2006, the club has maintained its presence in the top division of ACT football, through all its different naming incarnations. United has sustained a registration level of around 800 players throughout the club while numbers have begun growing once more since 2010 with the boom in the sport.

In 2013, Tuggies won their first title since 1999 when they claimed the 2013 Federation Cup with a 3–2 final victory over Cooma FC. Tuggeranong made the final after a comprehensive 6–0 third round victory at home over Narrabundah, 3–1 away win in the quarter finals over Canberra Olympic and a 3–2 penalty shootout victory at home over Woden Valley FC after the two southside teams played out a 0–0 draw in the semi-finals.

Tuggeranong ended up qualifying for the inaugural FFA Cup in 2014 as a result of their 2013 cup victory as detailed in the next section.

=== 2014 FFA Cup run ===
Tuggeranong United was the first club from Canberra to represent the ACT in the inaugural FFA Cup. Tuggers were not originally going to represent the nation's capital when Capital Football decided a pre-season cup competition in 2014 would decide who would represent the ACT, rather than last season's Federation Cup champions. Tuggeranong United were the 2013 Federation Cup champions after beating Cooma 3–2, and upon hearing the initial decision by Capital Football, decided to lodge a formal appeal to the federation to change their mind. With rival clubs backing, the appeal was successful at a Capital Football board meeting on 18 February 2014 and federation put Tuggeranong forward as the ACT representative on the proviso of finding a more suitable venue to host matches given Kambah 2 has only basic amenities and inadequate lighting. This decision directly affected 2014 Federation Cup winners, Belconnen United FC, as the blue devils missed out on qualification to the FFA Cup.

27 June 2014, Tuggeranong missed out on drawing an A-League team and were drawn away from home against Tasmanian club South Hobart FC in the inaugural FFA Cup round of 32 draw.

5 August 2014, United took to the field at KGV Park in Glenorchy against home side South Hobart. The two teams cancelled each other out for much of the match with the scores locked at 0–0 until the sixty ninth minute when Tuggeranong defender Sean Kiddey scored an own goal to give Hobart the lead. That galvanised Tuggeranong into applying pressure high up the park in the final twenty minutes of the match and the pressure paid off in the eighty fifth minute as Zac Munster latched onto the end of a Rory Delap style long throw from Kiddey to equalise for the visitors. No one could score in the extra-time so the match went to penalties. Tuggies goalkeeper, Rohan Shepherd, made a crucial save in the shoot-out to hand United a 5–4 penalty win and a historic victory. The match was broadcast online by volunteers of the South Hobart club with the commentary team of Callan Paske, Damian Gill and Trent ‘Corndog’ Cornish coining one of the first bits of FFA Cup folklore with their calling of yellow cards as "a slice of cheese". South Hobart president, Victoria Morton, praised the live stream which she suggested reached 18,000 – 20,000 people. Although this would be the first and final FFA Cup round to have clubs organise their own streaming of matches as the FFA and Fox Sports stopped the practice for the round of 16 in 2014 onwards.

22 August 2014, Tuggeranong United had a dream FFA Cup draw for the round of 16 as United drew A-League heavyweights Melbourne Victory at home in Canberra. After the draw, Tuggeranong United management announced Viking Park would be the venue for the high-profile match. The draw also enabled the opportunity for an emotional homecoming for former Tuggeranong United junior and Socceroo midfielder Carl Valeri.

In the lead-up to the Tuesday fixture, Tuggeranong United's players put their day jobs on hold and went into camp at the Alpha Hotel to prepare for the match at Viking Park against the Victory.

16 September 2014, Viking Park hosted its first Association football match between Tuggeranong United and Melbourne Victory in the 2014 FFA Cup round of 16. A then record crowd for the venue of 5.150 turned out to watch the David vs Goliath match-up. Tuggeranong United was put to the sword by a very strong Melbourne Victory team. A-League star and Victory marquee, Besart Berisha, scored a hat-trick on the night to lead Victory to a 6–0 drubbing of the home team. The loss ended Tuggeranong's 2014 FFA Cup campaign.

== Players ==
=== Current NPL Men First Grade squad ===
As of 1st of April 2026

Note: Flags indicate national team as defined under FIFA eligibility rules; some limited exceptions apply. Players may hold more than one non-FIFA nationality.

No.	Pos.	Nation	Player
1	GK	AUS	Callum Cook
2		AUS	Daniel Grove
3	C	AUS	Joshua Pedersen
4		AUS	Jack Green
5		AUS	Marcos Da Silva
8		AUS	Xabier Davies
9		AUS	Jenno Ceruti
11		AUS	William McCloskey
12		AUS	Jordan Rezek

No.	Pos.	Nation	Player
13	GK	AUS	Flynn McDonnell-Wilson
14		AUS	Nicholas Emanuel
15		AUS	Zac Lawrence
16		AUS	Nikolas Mamatas
17		AUS	Marco Alessandro Pena Alcazar
18		ARG	Sergio Lindner
19		AUS	Anthony Antoniak
20	GK	AUS	James Benivento
29		AUS	Matthew Williams
32		AUS	Geordie Freeman
37		AUS	Kobi Yariyari

=== Current NPL Women First Grade Squad ===
As of 1st of April 2026

=== Notable former players ===
Below is a list of players who have represented Tuggeranong United at junior or senior level and who have at least one international cap for a FIFA sanctioned national team.

Tuggeranong United Notable Former Representatives
Name	National Representation	Caps(Goals)	Reference
(Australia) Tom Rogic	Australian national football team	23(5)	
(Australia) Carl Valeri	Australian national football team	52(1)	
(Australia) Nikolai Topor-Stanley	Australian national football team	4(0)	
(Australia) Lindsay Wilson	Australian national football team	2(0)	
(Australia) Amy Duggan (née Taylor)	Australia women's national football team	20(1)	
(Australia) Lydia Williams	Australia women's national football team	57(0)	
(Australia) Ben Williams	FIFA Referee	206	

== Coaching staff ==
=== NPL ===
As of 1st of April 2026

Men
Position	Name
Head coach	(Australia) Mitch Stevens
U23's Coach	(Australia) Van Nguyen

Women
Position	Name
Head coach	(Australia) Mitch Stevens
Reserve's Coach	

== Honours ==
As of 9 February 2017

- ACT League/NPL 1 Premiers and Finals Champions

Premiers (2): 1983, 1991
Champions (2): 1991, 1992

- ACT Capital League Premiers and Champions
  - Capital Premier League

Premiers (1): 2022
Champions (1): 2022

- Capital Football Federation Cup

Winners (4): 1989, 1993, 1994, 2013

== Season-by-Season Results ==
The below table is updated with the statistics and final results for Tuggeranong United following the conclusion of each National Premier League Capital Football and Men's Capital Premier League season.

Champions	Runners-up	Third place

Tuggeranong United Season-by-Season Results
Ref	Season	National Premier League ACT										NPL Finals	Fed Cup	FFA Cup	Top scorer	
Ref	Season	GP	W	D	L	GF	GA	GD	PTS	League	Finals	NPL Finals	Fed Cup	FFA Cup	Name	Goals
	2012	21	7	0	14	44	65	-21	21	6th	-		SF	-	Mark Shields	21
	2013	23	3	2	18	30	71	−41	11	9th	–	–	W	–	Mouad Zwed	8
	2014	16	6	0	10	26	45	−19	18	6th	–	–	QF	R16	Matthew Menser	4
	2015	16	0	0	16	12	56	−44	0	9th	–	–	SF	–	Zachary Munster	6
	2016	18	6	3	9	26	35	−9	21	7th	–	–	SF	–	Andrew Slavich	7
	2017	18	8	2	8	30	34	−4	26	7th	–	–	QF	–	Fernando Jorquera	6
	2018	16	8	2	6	32	32	+0	26	4th	SF	–	2R	–	Aisosa Ihegie	10
	2019	16	7	0	9	22	28	-6	21	6th	-	-	SF	-		
	2020	10	2	3	5	8	20	-12	9	8th	-	n/a	-	-		
	2021	17	0	7	10	15	31	-16	7	8th (R)	-	n/a	-	-		
Ref	Season	Capital Premier League ACT										Charity Shield	Fed Cup	Australia Cup	Top Scorer	
Ref	Season	GP	W	D	L	GF	GA	GD	PTS	League	Finals	Charity Shield	Fed Cup	Australia Cup	Name	Goals
	2022	23	16	2	3	83	18	65	56	Premiers	Champions	-	5th Round	-		
Ref	Season	National Premier League ACT										Charity Shield	Fed Cup	Australia Cup	Top Scorer	
Ref	Season	GP	W	D	L	GF	GA	GD	PTS	League	Finals	Charity Shield	Fed Cup	Australia Cup	Name	Goals
	2023	21	4	2	15	25	65	-40	14	7th	-	-	4th Round	-		
	2024	21	7	5	9	31	34	-3	26	6th	-	-	6th Round	-		
	2025	21	7	6	8	31	50	-19	27	4th	SF	-	6th Round	-		
