= Canberra Croatia FC =

Australian semi-professional soccer club

- Full name: Canberra Croatia Football Club
- Nicknames: Croatia; Deakin
- Founded: 1958; 68 years ago
- Ground: Deakin Stadium
- Capacity: 1,500
- Coordinates: 35°18′50″S 149°06′20″E
- Chairman: Tony Pratezina
- Manager: Dean Ugrinic
- League: NPL Capital Football
- 2026: 1st of 11 (premiers)
- Website: https://croatiadeakinsoccerclub.com.au/canberra-croatia-football-club/
Home colours	Away colours

Canberra Croatia Football Club is an Australian semi-professional soccer club based in the suburb of Deakin in the south of Canberra, Australian Capital Territory. Founded in 1958, the club currently competes in the National Premier Leagues Capital Football and also compete in the Australian Championship as an invitee after winning Capital Football's NPL Premiership in the 2026 season.

Since 1960, Canberra Croatia has always competed in the top level of ACT soccer either side of a brief stint in the top level of NSW soccer between 1988 and 1994. They are the most successful soccer club in ACT history with 27 league premierships, 18 finals championships and 20 ACT Federation Cups.

== History ==
=== Establishment and early years ===
Canberra FC was established in 1958 by the local Canberran Croatian community as Croatia Soccer Club but was simply known as Croatia. The club commenced competitive play and entered the ACT second division in 1959. After spending one season in the second division, Croatia SC was promoted to the first division.

In 1960 the newly formed ACT Soccer Association, working under the title of Soccer Canberra, introduced new club naming regulations that prohibited names with ethnic ties. Croatia SC changed its name to Soccer Club HOPE in accordance to the new regulations. The name however was chosen to reflect the acronym of the Croatian Liberation Movement, who are known as HOP.

SC HOPE won its first title in 1962, beating Kosciusko to the league Premiership crown. HOPE backed up this first title up with success in the finals series as the club added the Championship title to its honours list with a 7–3 victory over Kosciusko in the grand final. HOPE additionally added the 1962 ACT Federations Cup and NSW Robertson Cup to complete a quadruple title haul. The club added a further two premierships and a championship to its cabinet between 1963 and 1966 as HOPE and Juventus battled it out in the league and finals for titles.

In 1967 the club changed its name back to Croatia with a slightly different full name of Croatia Deakin Soccer Club to reflect the suburb the club is from and based. Croatia finished the 1967 season as league runner-up to Juventus but claimed a 2–1 victory in the grand final over Cooma United.

17 August 1969, Croatia Deakin claimed its fourth league title of its first full decade in ACT soccer and twelfth title overall (4 Premierships & Championships, 2 Federation Cups, 1 ACT Ampol Cup and 1 NSW Robertson Cup). Then on 11 November 1969, to complete the decade, Croatia Deakin opened its clubrooms, restaurants and bars on Grose St Deakin, across the road from the soccer ground. This new clubhouse and soccer facilities was the first of its kind in Canberra.

=== 70s and 80s ===
The 1970s and 80s saw the club continue accomplishment on the field with more premiership and trophy successes. The highlight of these successes was the three consecutive undefeated seasons between 1986 and 1988 when Deakin registered a total 42 wins, 6 draws, 0 losses, 174 goals for and 27 goals against.

In 1975, Croatia Deakin competed in the inaugural full Croatian Australian Tournament (Croatian Cup). The tournament was established to provide Australian and New Zealand soccer clubs with Croatian heritage a cup competition to compete for following Melbourne Croatia's expulsion from the Victorian Soccer Federation in 1974. Sydney Croatia hosted the tournament with Croatia Deakin defeating the hosts 3–1 in the tournament final.

In 1989, Croatia Deakin changed its name to Canberra Croatia and replaced Canberra City Griffins in the NSW Division One (highest league in NSW). Canberra Croatia finished its first season in NSW as runner-up to Melita Eagles and lost the grand final 2–0 to the same opposition.

=== 90s and 2000s ===
Canberra Croatia competed in the top division of NSW until 1995 with the club qualifying for finals five out of six seasons. Croatia finished league runner-up in 1990 and lost the grand final in 1990 and 91 to Wollongong Macedonia and Blacktown City respectively. The club also changed its official name twice during this period to Canberra Metro (91–92) and Canberra Deakin in 1993.

In 1995 the club returned to ACT soccer and re-joined the ACT top division, by now renamed the ACT Premier League. Deakin marked its return to ACT soccer by winning the ACT Premier League with a fourteen-point advantage over second placed Shamrock Rovers and by defeating Juventus 3–2 in the grand final.

In 2006, Canberra Deakin changed its name to Canberra FC before the start of the 2006 ACT Premier League season.

In June 2007, Canberra FC participated in the inaugural ‘Croatian World Club Championship’ for Croatian diaspora in Zagreb, Croatia alongside other teams of Croatian heritage from around the world including Canada, USA, Germany, France and Austria. Canberra FC was a late entrant into the tournament after Sydney United had to pull out for financial and organisational reasons. The tournament was broken into two groups with the top teams playing off in the final and the second placed teams playing off for bronze. CFC topped Group B after a 5–1 victory over French club AS Croatia Villefranche, a 2–2 draw with SD Croatia Berlin and a 3–1 victory over HNK Zrinski Chicago. Canberra FC played Toronto Croatia in the tournament final and took a first half lead before a second half comeback by the Canadian club saw Canberra FC succumb to a final 1–3 defeat and claim silver in the tournament.

Canberra FC returned to compete in the Croatian World Club Championship in 2011 and 2015. Canberra FC finished with the silver, again, in 2011 with a 0–5 loss, again, to Toronto Croatia in the final. In 2015 Canberra FC finished fourth in the tournament with the side defeated 0–3 once more by Toronto Croatia in the bronze play-off.

=== NPL era ===
Canberra FC was a founding member of the NPL ACT in 2013 following Football Federation Australia’s national re-structure of soccer leagues in Australia. Canberra FC finished its first NPL season as league premiers, seven points ahead of second placed Belconnen United. Deakin won the major semi-final against the same opposition 4–0 before succumbing 0–2 in extra time to Canberra Olympic at McKellar Park in the grand final.

During the first four seasons of the NPL, Canberra FC won two league titles in 2013 and 2015 and lost four grand finals in a row between 2013 and 2016.

23 March 2017, it was reported that Canberra FC had joined the recently formed Australian Association of Football Clubs. This Association was set up to represent National Premier League clubs interests at local, state and national levels.

In 2018, Canberra FC won the ACT treble by claiming the League premiership, finals championship and the Federation Cup titles. The head coach, Paul Macor, stood down from his position after just one season, being replaced by Luka Udjur as head coach for the 2019 season.

In 2022 Canberra Croatia won the ACT NPL League title.

In 2023 Canberra Croatia won the ACT NPL Mens Grand Final

In 2024 Canberra Croatia went back-to-back and won the ACT NPL Mens Grand final.

In 2025, they competed in the inaugural Australian Championship, after becoming ACT Premiers in the regular season. On 19 October, in their first home game of the competition, they came from behind twice to beat tournament heavyweights Preston Lions 3-2.

== Club identity ==
=== Colours and badge ===
The club colours are red, white and blue reflecting the club's Croatian heritage. The badge depicts the flagpole of Parliament House, a symbol of Canberra, over red and white check reflecting the Coat of arms of Croatia.

=== Club name changes ===
The club was founded in 1958 as Croatia Soccer Club by local Croatian Australians, later being renamed HOPE, Croatia Deakin, Canberra Croatia, Canberra Metro, Canberra Deakin, Canberra FC before returning to the name Canberra Croatia after the abolition of the National Club Identity Policy allowing teams to return to ethnic names.

Club Name Changes
Name	Dates
Croatia Soccer Club	1958–1959
HOPE	1960–1966
Croatia Deakin	1967–1988
Canberra Croatia	1989–1990
Canberra Metro	1991–1992
Canberra Deakin	1993–2005
Canberra FC	2006–2019
Canberra Croatia	2020–present

=== Home ground and facilities ===
Deakin Stadium (formerly Deakin Football Centre) is the home stadium of Canberra Croatia. It is owned by Croatia Deakin Football Club, who also own Canberra Croatia. The suburban ground went through a major reconstruction between 2005 and 2008 and was officially re-opened in 2008. The ground's official capacity is 1,500 but its record attendance is 2,782 (2016 NPL Grand Final between Canberra Croatia and Canberra Olympic).

== Players ==
=== Current squad ===
As of 12 October 2026

Note: Flags indicate national team as defined under FIFA eligibility rules; some limited exceptions apply. Players may hold more than one non-FIFA nationality.

No.	Pos.	Nation	Player
1	GK	AUS	Finn Jurak
2	DF	AUS	David Seselja
3	DF	BRA	Diego De Oliveira (on loan)
4	DF	AUS	Mathew Grbesa (Captain)
5	DF	AUS	Nikola Ujdur
6	MF	AUS	Ryan Keir (Captain)
7	MF	AUS	Jason Ugrinic
8	FW	AUS	Shandon Whitehead
9	FW	ENG	Thomas James
10	FW	AUS	Daniel Colbertaldo
11	FW	AUS	Mikey Katsoulis
13	DF	AUS	Riley Zsuzsa
15	MF	AUS	Anthony Rakic

No.	Pos.	Nation	Player
16	MF	AUS	Andrija Rakić
17	MF	AUS	Jay McGowan (on loan)
18	MF	AUS	Brian Sutomo (on loan)
19	DF	AUS	Tony Spaseski
20	GK	AUS	Adrian-Jamie Bazina
22	MF	AUS	Nikola Daniel Jadric
23	FW	ARG	Diego Celis (on loan)
25	DF	AUS	Xavier Cussen
26	MF	AUS	Cadel Zwangobani
27	FW	AUS	Kade Lyons
90	MF	AUS	Josh Gaspari
99	GK	AUS	Andy Tsakalos
—	MF	AUS	Marko Jadric (injured)

=== Notable former players ===
Below is a list of players who have represented Canberra Croatia at senior or junior level and who have at least one senior or junior international cap for a FIFA sanctioned national team or at least one club cap for a top division national league.

Notable former Canberra Croatia players
Name	National/Club Team	Int Caps (G)
(Australia) Peter Buljan	Australia U23	
(Australia) Andrew Barisic	Gold Coast United (A-League)	
(Australia) Kofi Danning	Australia U23	5 (1)
(Australia) Stan Dukić	Canberra Cosmos (NSL)	
(Australia) Ivan Gruijčić	Canberra City (NSL)	
(Australia) Velimir Kuprešak	Sydney United (NSL)	
(Australia) Ante Juric	Australia	4 (1)
(Australia) Steven Lustica	Australia U20	21 (3)
(Australia) Brad Maloney	Australia	6 (2)
(Australia) Ante Milicic	Australia	6 (5)
(Australia) Andy Rakic	Sydney United (NSL)	
(Scotland) Tom Sermanni	Marconi Stallions (NSL)	
(Croatia) Josip Šimunić	Croatia	105 (3)
(Australia) Zeljko Susa	Australia U23	
(Australia) Goran Talevski	Hajduk Split (HNL)	
(Australia) Nikolai Topor-Stanley	Australia	4 (0)
(Australia) Walter Valeri	APIA Leichhardt Tigers (NSL)	
(Australia) Ivan Zelic	Australia	
(Australia) Ned Zelic	Australia	34 (3)

== Honours ==
As of 9 December 2017

ACT

- ACT League Premiers and Finals Champions
  - Premiers (27): 1962, 1963, 1966, 1969, 1973, 1979, 1986, 1987, 1988, 1995, 2001, 2002, 2003, 2004, 2005, 2007, 2008, 2009, 2010, 2011, 2013, 2015, 2018, 2020, 2022, 2025, 2026
  - Champions (18): 1962, 1966, 1967, 1978, 1979, 1987, 1988, 1995, 2003, 2004, 2005, 2007, 2009, 2010, 2011, 2018, 2020, 2024
- Capital Football Federation Cup
  - Winners (20): 1962, 1964, 1972, 1974, 1978, 1984, 1985, 1986, 1995, 2002, 2004, 2006, 2007, 2009, 2010, 2011, 2012, 2018, 2023, 2025
- ACT Ampol Cup
  - Winners (5): 1963, 1972, 1973, 1987, 1988
- ACT Club Championship
  - Winners (12): 1977, 1979, 1980, 1986, 1987, 1988, 1995, 2002, 2004, 2005, 2008, 2011

NSW

- NSW Division One
  - League Runner-up (2): 1989, 1990
  - Grand Final Runner-up (3): 1989, 1990, 1991
- Waratah Cup
  - Winners (1): 1990
  - Runner-up (1): 1992
- Robertson Cup
  - Champions (1): 1962

Others

- Croatian Cup (Australia & New Zealand)
  - Champions (6): 1975, 1986, 1992, 1994, 2001, 2005
- Argentina Cup
  - Champions (1): 1983/84
- Croatian World Club Championship
  - Runner-up (2): 2007, 2011

== Head-to-head records ==
=== NPL Teams ===
Opponent	Played	Won	Drawn	Lost	Win %
Belconnen United	128	85	13	30	66.4
Canberra Olympic FC	154	69	32	53	44.8
Canberra White Eagles	2	2	0	0	100
Gungahlin United	128	52	31	45	40.6
Monaro Panthers	90	54	13	23	60
O'Connor Knights	18	12	2	4	66.7
Queanbeyan City	9	8	0	1	88.9
Tigers FC	72	41	12	19	56.9
Tuggeranong United	91	64	14	13	70.3
West Canberra Wanderers	87	51	6	30	58.6

- Includes NPL Matches, FED Cup Matches, Charity Shield, ACT Ampol Cup, and Capital Football Federation Cup finals matches from 1962-2026

=== Non/Former NPL Teams ===
Opponent	Played	Won	Drawn	Lost	Win %
ANU FC	37	33	4	0	89.2
Canberra City FC	72	52	5	16	74.8
Riverina Rhinos	6	5	1	0	90.9
Yoogali FC	6	5	0	1	90.9

- Includes NPL Matches, FED Cup Matches, Charity Shield, ACT Ampol Cup, and Capital Football Federation Cup finals matches from 1962-2012

== Season-by-season results ==
The below table is updated with the statistics and final results for Canberra FC following the conclusion of each National Premier League Capital Football season.

Champions	Runners-up	Third Place

Canberra FC Season-by-Season Results
Season	National Premier League ACT										NPL Finals	Fed Cup	FFA Cup	Top scorer	
Season	GP	W	D	L	GF	GA	GD	PTS	League	Finals	NPL Finals	Fed Cup	FFA Cup	Name	Goals
1988	14	12	2	0	35	6	+29	26	Premiers	Champions	–	–	–	–	
2004	18	12	3	3	39	16	+29	39	Premiers	Champions	–	W	–	–	
2005	18	15	2	1	62	17	+47	47	Premiers	Champions	–	QF	–	–	
2006	16	7	6	3	41	30	+11	27	3rd	Semi-final	–	W	–	–	
2007	16	12	3	1	42	16	+26	39	Premiers	Champions	–	W	–	–	
2008	16	15	0	1	50	10	+40	45	Premiers	Runner-up	–	RU	–	–	
2009	16	14	2	0	60	10	+50	44	Premiers	Champions	–	W	–	–	
2010	18	12	5	1	57	15	+42	41	Premiers	Champions	–	W	–	–	
2011	16	14	0	2	77	20	+57	42	Premiers	Champions	–	W	–	–	
2012	21	10	6	5	52	32	+20	36	3rd	Preliminary Final	–	W	–	–	
2013	23	18	0	5	86	22	+64	54	Premiers	Runner-up	QF	SF	–	Alex Oloriegbe	21
2014	16	8	1	7	51	28	+23	25	4th	Runner-up	–	RU	–	Alex Oloriegbe	14
2015	16	11	3	2	53	27	+26	36	Premiers	Runner-up	QF	2R	–	Thomas James	19
2016	18	10	2	6	44	31	+13	32	4th	Runner-up	–	QF	–	Thomas James	18
2017	18	9	4	5	45	21	+24	31	5th	Semi-final	QF	SF	–	Nikolaos Kalfas	7
2018	16	12	2	2	46	13	+33	38	Premiers	Champions	QF	W	R32	Thomas James	19
2019	16	8	2	6	39	27	+12	26	4th	Semi-final	–	RU	–	Daniel Barac	11
2020	7	5	2	0	17	9	+8	17	Premiers	Champions	–	RU	–	Kista Aimilio	4
2021	17	11	0	6	37	22	+15	33	2nd	–	–	SF	–	Daniel Barac	9

== See also ==
- List of Croatian football clubs in Australia
- Australian-Croatian Soccer Tournament
- Croatian Australian
