= Deakin Stadium =

Football ground in Australia

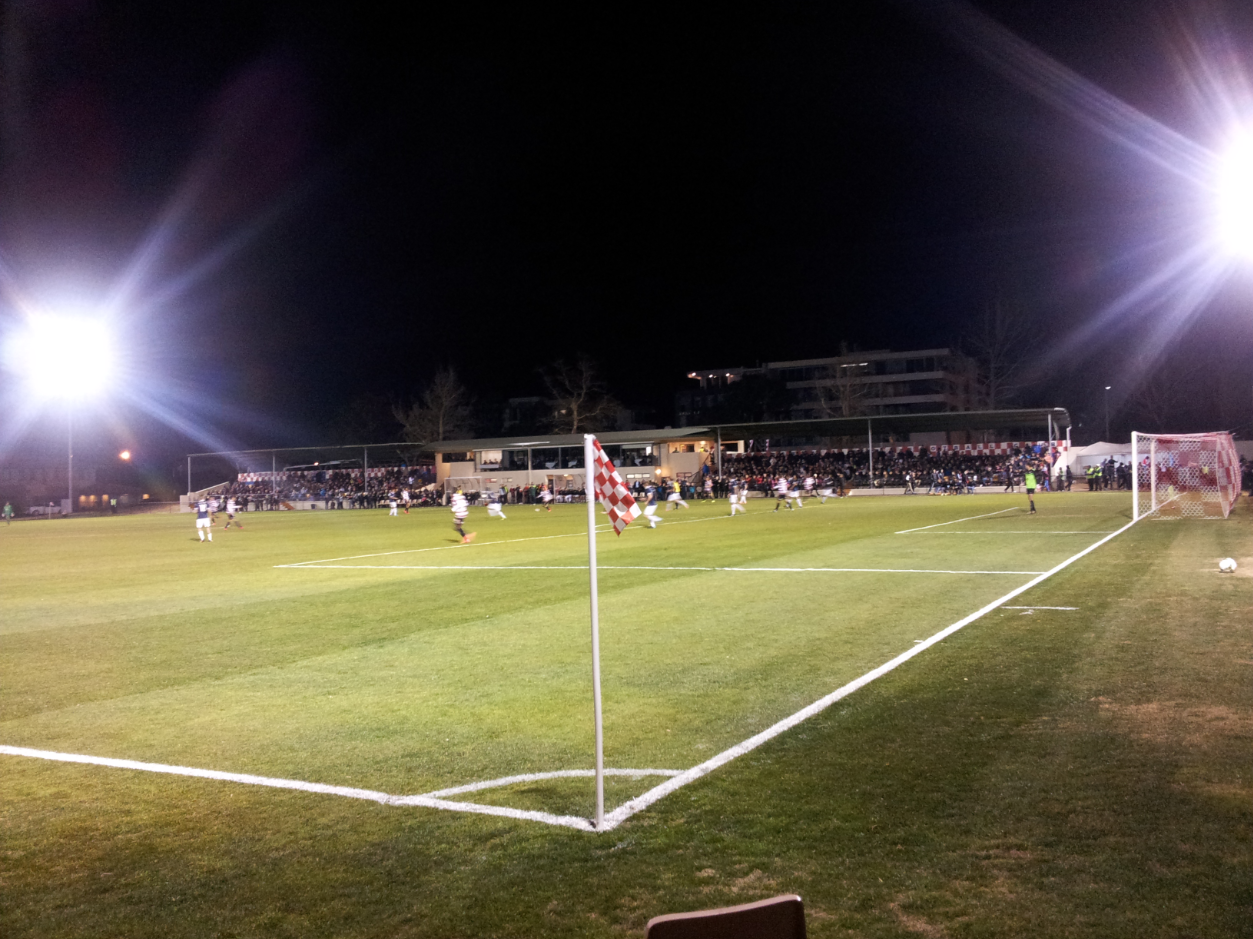
- Interactive map of Deakin Stadium
- Former names: Deakin Football Centre
- Location: Corner of Grose St and Hannah Pl, Deakin, Australian Capital Territory
- Coordinates: 35°18′50″S 149°6′20″E
- Owner: Canberra Deakin Football Club
- Capacity: 1,500
- Surface: Grass
- Scoreboard: Yes (small)
- Record attendance: 2,782

Construction
- Built: 2005-08
- Opened: 2008

Tenant
- Canberra Croatia FC

Website
- Deakin Stadium Home

Deakin Stadium is an association football ground located in the south-central Canberra suburb of Deakin, ACT. It is the home ground of Canberra Croatia FC in the NPL ACT.

== Primary Use ==
Canberra FC are the primary tenants of Deakin Stadium. Canberra FC play home matches in the National Premier Leagues Capital Football at the stadium as well Capital Football Federation Cup matches.

== Events history ==
=== 2018 Canberra FC FFA Cup ===
On 25 July 2018, Canberra FC qualified in the Round of 32 of the FFA Cup for the first time and was beaten by Broadmeadow Magic 4–1 at Deakin Stadium.

=== 2016 Canberra Olympic FFA Cup run ===
During 2016 the stadium was used by local ACT NPL club Canberra Olympic for their FFA Cup run. Olympic played their round of 32, round of 16 and quarter-final matches at the stadium before moving to Viking Park in Tuggeranong for their semi-final match against A-league side Sydney FC. The quarter final match was played on 27 September 2016 against Victorian NPL side Green Gully SC. The match attracted a crowd of 2,039 as Olympic pulled off a historic victory with a penalty conversion in the 95th minute of the match giving the home side a 1–0 victory.

=== 2015 Asian Cup ===
Deakin Stadium was selected as one of three venues to be used as a training venue as part of the 2015 Asian Cup in the ACT along with host venue Canberra Stadium and the second training venue McKellar Park. The stadium received an upgrade to its lighting as part of the $650,000 ACT facility upgrade fund for the tournament. South Korea was the primary team that used Deakin Stadium for closed training sessions during the tournament while they were base in Canberra.

=== Canberra United FC ===
Deakin Stadium is used as an alternative venue for Canberra's W-League team. Canberra United. United normally play at McKellar Park in Canberra's north but every now and then they will play a game in Deakin. On 4 December 2010, A match between Canberra United and Adelaide United was abandoned at Deakin Stadium after sixty-eight minutes due to the referee declaring the pitch unplayable following a torrential rain burst. Canberra at the time was 4–0 up in front of 576 souls brave enough to brace the wet conditions. In 2012 Canberra United played two matches at Deakin Stadium on the 5th and 8 December against Perth Glory and Newcastle Jets respectively.

=== A-League pre-season friendlies ===
Deakin Stadium has a long standing of hosting pre-season matches between Canberra FC and A-League opposition. The below table details these matches:

Year	Home team	Away team	Reference
2008	ACT Rockets (PL Select XI)	Central Coast Mariners	
2010	Canberra FC	Central Coast Mariners	
2011	Canberra FC	Central Coast Mariners	
2014	Canberra FC	Sydney FC	
2014	Canberra FC	Western Sydney Wanderers	
2015	Canberra FC	Western Sydney Wanderers	
2016	Canberra FC	Western Sydney Wanderers	
2017	Canberra Olympic	Newcastle United Jets	

== Records ==
Record attendance: 2,782 (Canberra FC vs Canberra Olympic, 11 September 2016, NPL ACT Grand Final).
