= National Premier Leagues Capital Football Men's =

National Premier Leagues Capital Football
- Founded: 2013 (13 years ago); 1992–2012 (as Premier League); 1952–1991 (as Division One)
- Country: Australia
- State: (Australian Capital Territory) ACT (New South Wales) NSW
- Confederation: AFC
- Number of clubs: 11
- Level on pyramid: 2
- Domestic cup(s): Australia Cup; Federation Cup
- Current champions: Tigers FC (2025)
- Current premiers: Canberra Croatia (2026)
- Most championships: Canberra Olympic; Canberra Croatia (3 titles)
- Website: NPL Capital Football 1
- Current: 2026 NPL Capital Football

The National Premier Leagues Capital Football (also known as NPL ACT 1 or simply NPL1) is a soccer competition contested by clubs affiliated to Capital Football. The league is the highest level competition in the Australian Capital Territory (ACT) region. It is a subdivision of the National Premier Leagues and sits in Level 2 in the overall Australian league system.

== History ==
After the 2006 season, the tournament was reorganised based on criteria mandating a development pathway within clubs, where each club is required to field a squad in the reserves and Under-18 divisions. Nine teams contested in the Premier League in 2007, cutting Gungahlin Juventus, White Eagles and reigning premier Cooma Tigers from the top tier.

The same nine teams remained in the Premier League for 2008 and 2009. The pathway system was expanded to include a Premier U16 competition, with all nine clubs required to field a team from their club or an affiliated club. Capital Football initially revoked the licence of Queanbeyan City for the 2009 season, citing a non-compliance with the developmental and administrative standards expected for the league. However, Queanbeyan were reinstated on appeal and following the presentation of further evidence demonstrating these standards could be met.

At the close of the 2009 season, the licences of all participating clubs were reviewed and expressions of interest sought for new additional entrants to the competition for 2010–2012.

In November 2014 Woden Weston FC was incorporated with the intention to merge the elite levels of Woden Valley FC and Weston Molonglo FC into one club, to compete in the National Premier Leagues in 2015 and beyond. The new merged club was officially launched on 20 February 2015, with colours for their new strip sourced from both clubs (black from Weston Creek and red from Woden Valley).

In 2016 the league was expanded to 10 teams with the addition of the Canberra United Academy (CUA) team. The decision by Capital Football to include the CUA in the top division of ACT soccer was met with opposition by other clubs in the league, citing concern with the prospect of losing their best young players to the Academy. Along with the addition of the CUA, other clubs were concerned with lack of action taken on making the Presidents of the NPL clubs voting members of the Capital Football board. A possible rebel league was mooted, and it was believed there had already been contact made with the Referees' Association and potential sponsorship lined up by the NPL clubs.

2016 also saw the establishment of the Capital Football Charity Shield to be played between the Federation Cup winners and NPL league champions before the start of the regular NPL season, as a charity fund-raiser. The inaugural Capital Football Charity Shield match was contested on 18 March 2016 between Canberra FC (2015 League premiers) and Gungahlin United (2015 Federation Cup winners) at Gungahlin Enclosed Oval.

7 November 2016, Capital Football announced the introduction of Riverina Rhinos for the men's and boy's National Premier Leagues Capital Football for 2017. Riverina has replaced the controversial Canberra United Academy, who have been amalgamated with the FFA Centre of Excellence, maintaining a ten team league.

18 March 2017, Canberra Olympic won the first piece of ACT soccer silverware for the 2017 season with an emphatic 5–2 victory over Tigers FC at Gungahlin Enclosed oval to claim the second edition of the ACT Charity Shield. The match raised $1500 for charity CanTeen Australia with both clubs and Capital Football each contributing $500. Joshua Gulevski and Stephen Domenici both scored braces for Olympic while a long range goal from Robbie Cattanach clinched the high scoring victory for last season's league and final double winners.

== Competition format ==
NPL1 Teams play a league season, followed by a finals series for the top 4 clubs. Clubs are required to field teams in all age groups (1st Grade and Under-20s).

A cup competition is contested by Premier League teams and other teams from the region, known as the Westfield FFA Cup Qualifiers, for which the winner is awarded the Federation Cup. The winners of the Federation Cup gain entry into the national FFA Cup competition.

=== Promotion and relegation ===
In 2019, the NPL ACT 2 competition was formed. The bottom team from NPL 1 competition was relegated for the 2020 season.

== Clubs ==
=== Current season ===
The following clubs competed in the 2026 season.

2026 NPL1 ACT based clubs
2025 NPL1 NSW based clubs

2026 NPL 1
Club	Location	State	Home grounds	Founded	Joined league	2025 Position
Belconnen United FC	McKellar	ACT	McKellar Park	1970	2026	1st *Promoted from CPL 2025
Brindabella Blues FC	Calwell	ACT	Everlast Enclosed	1990	2026	5th *Promoted from CPL 2025
Canberra Croatia FC	Deakin	ACT	Deakin Stadium	1958	2013	1st *Premiers
Canberra Juventus FC	Gungahlin	ACT	Gungahlin Enclosed	1953	2026	4th *Promoted from CPL 2025
Canberra Olympic FC	O'Connor	ACT	O'Connor Enclosed	1955	2026	2nd *Promoted from CPL 2025
Canberra White Eagles FC	Phillip	ACT	Woden Park	1992	2026	6th *Promoted from CPL 2025
Tigers FC	Bruce	ACT	AIS Field	1952	2013	2nd *Champions
HNK O'Connor Knights FC	O'Connor	ACT	O'Connor Enclosed	1997	2022	8th
Monaro Panthers FC	Queanbeyan	NSW	Riverside Stadium	1967	2013	3rd
Queanbeyan City FC	Queanbeyan	NSW	High Street	1966	2025	6th
Tuggeranong United FC	Greenway	ACT	Greenway Enclosed	1976	2013	4th

=== Former Premier League or NPL clubs ===
Club	Location	State	Home ground	Founded	Last season
ANU FC	Acton	ACT	ANU Willows Oval	1962	2010
Burns FC	Kambah	ACT	Kambah	1925	1967
Canberra City FC	Hackett	ACT	Hackett 2	1977	2014
Canberra United Academy FC	McKellar	ACT	McKellar Park	2015	2016
FFA Centre of Excellence	Bruce	ACT	Australian Institute of Sport	1981	2017
Goulburn Strikers FC	Goulburn	NSW	Strikers Park	2001	2011
Gungahlin United FC	Gungahlin	ACT	Gungahlin Enclosed Oval	1997	2025
Narrabundah FC	Narrabundah	ACT	Narrabundah 2	1976	1987
Riverina Rhinos FC	Griffith	NSW	SolarMad Stadium	2014	2019
West Canberra Wanderers FC	Pearce	ACT	Melrose High School (Canberra)	2014	2023
Weston Creek FC	Waramanga	ACT	Waramanga Playing Fields	1971	2002
Yoogali FC	Griffith	NSW	SolarMad Stadium	2014	2025

== Honours ==
=== NPL seasons (2013–present) ===
A snapshot of each NPL Capital Football 1 season since the formation of the NPL in 2013.

Season	Competition	Regular season		ACT Finals			NPL finals series representation
Season	Competition	League Premiers	League Runners-Up	Champions	Score	Finalists	NPL finals series representation
2013	NPL CF	Canberra FC	Belconnen United	Canberra Olympic	2–0	Canberra FC	Canberra FC – Quarter-finals
2014	NPL CF	Cooma Tigers	Belconnen United	Belconnen United	3–3 (3–2 (p))	Canberra FC	Cooma Tigers – Quarter-finals
2015	NPL CF	Canberra FC	Tigers FC	Canberra Olympic	3–1	Canberra FC	Canberra FC – Quarter-finals
2016	NPL CF	Canberra Olympic	Tigers FC	Canberra Olympic	3–1	Canberra FC	Canberra Olympic – Quarter-finals
2017	NPL CF	Canberra Olympic	FFA COE	Belconnen United	2–1	Canberra Olympic	Canberra Olympic – Quarter-finals
2018	NPL CF	Canberra FC	Canberra Olympic	Canberra FC	2–1	Canberra Olympic	Canberra FC – Quarter-finals
2019	NPL CF 1	Canberra Olympic	Tigers FC	Gungahlin United	5–0	Tigers FC	Canberra Olympic – Quarter-finals
2020	NPL CF 1	No Premier declared.^{1}		Canberra Croatia	3–1	Gungahlin United	Not held due to the COVID-19 pandemic in Australia
2021	NPL CF 1	Tigers FC	Canberra Croatia	Not held. (Note: ACT finals series cancelled due to the COVID-19 pandemic in Australia.)			Not held due to the COVID-19 pandemic in Australia
2022	NPL CF 1	Canberra Croatia	Gungahlin United	Monaro Panthers	2–1	Canberra Croatia	Not held
2023	NPL CF 1	HNK O'Connor Knights	Gungahlin United	Canberra Croatia	1–1 (6–5 (p))	HNK O'Connor Knights	Not held
2024	NPL CF 1	Gungahlin United	Canberra Croatia	Canberra Croatia	4–3	Canberra Tigers	Not held
Season	Competition	League Premiers	League Runners-Up	Champions	Score	Finalists	Australian Championship representation
2025	NPL CF 1	Canberra Croatia	Tigers FC	Tigers FC	3–0	Monaro Panthers	Canberra Croatia – Group stage
2026	NPL CF 1	Canberra Croatia	Monaro Panthers	Cooma Tigers	5–1	Canberra Croatia	Canberra Croatia – Group stage

=== NPL/Pre-NPL (1952–2012) all-time record ===
National Premier Leagues Capital Football honours since introduction in 2013.

Honours
Club	Premierships Wins	Premiership Years	Championships Wins	Championship years	Shields Wins	Shield Years	Total
Canberra Croatia	6	2013, 2015, 2018, 2022, 2025, 2026	3	2018, 2020, 2023	4	2016, 2019, 2021, 2023	11
Canberra Olympic	3	2016, 2017, 2019	3	2013, 2015, 2016	2	2017, 2018	8
Belconnen United			2	2014, 2017			2
Tigers FC	2	2014, 2021					2
Gungahlin United			1	2019			1
Monaro Panthers			1	2022	1	2022	2
HNK O'Connor Knights	1	2023					1

A snapshot of each ACT top division season between 1952 and 2012 before the NPL started in 2013.

Season	Competition	Regular season		Finals		
Season	Competition	League Premiers	League Runners-Up	Champions	Score	Finalists
1952	Division One	Season standings & results unknown				
1953	Division One	Season standings & results unknown				
1954	Division One	Napad		Napad	6–2	Hollandia
1955	Division One	Napad	Roma	Hollandia	2–1	Canberra United (Note: Burns Football Club – the oldest surviving soccer club in Canberra, established in 1925)
1956	Division One	Balkan	Canberra United	No Finals Series held		
1957	Division One	Bohemians	Canberra United Burns	No Finals Series held		
1958	Division One	Bohemians	Wistula	Olympic	3–1	Bohemians
1959	Division One	Bohemians	FTC Hungaria	No Finals Series held		
1960	Division One	FTC Hungaria	Olympic	No Finals Series held		
1961	Division One	FTC Hungaria	Olympic	FTC Hungaria	2–1	Olympic
1962	Division One	SC Hope	Kosciusko	SC Hope	7–3	Kosciusko
1963	Division One	SC Hope	Queanbeyan	No Finals Series held		
1964	Division One	Juventus	Cooma United	Juventus	2–2, 4–3	Cooma United
1965	Division One	Juventus	Cooma United	Juventus	4–3	SC Hope
1966	Division One	SC Hope	Juventus	SC Hope	1–1 (5–4 (p))	Juventus
1967	Division One	Juventus	Croatia Deakin	Croatia Deakin	2–1	Cooma United
1968	Division One	Juventus	Inter Monaro	Juventus	1–1; 3–1 (Note: won on replay)	Croatia Deakin
1969	Division One	Croatia Deakin	Queanbeyan Macedonia	Final abandoned		
1970	Division One	Juventus	Queanbeyan Macedonia	Juventus	3–1	Turner Eagles
1971	Division One	Griffith United	Inter Monaro	No Finals Series held		
1972	Division One	Juventus	Croatia Deakin	No Finals Series held		
1973	Division One	Croatia Deakin	Juventus	No Finals Series held		
1974	Division One	West Woden Juventus	Croatia Deakin	No Finals Series held		
1975	Division One	Downer Olympic	Croatia Deakin	West Woden Juventus	2–0	Croatia Deakin
1976	Division One	West Woden Juventus	Inter Monaro	West Woden Juventus	2–1	Croatia Deakin
1977	Division One	Inter Monaro	West Woden Juventus	Inter Monaro	3–2	West Woden Juventus
1978	Division One	West Woden Juventus	Croatia Deakin	Croatia Deakin	3–2	West Woden Juventus
1979	Division One	Croatia Deakin	West Woden Juventus	Croatia Deakin	3–2	Canberra City Roos
1980	Division One	Downer Olympic	Croatia Deakin	West Woden Juventus	3–2	Downer Olympic
1981	Division One	Luso (Note: Became Majura-Luso before folding in 1985)	Narrabundah	Luso	1–0	Narrabundah
1982	Division One	Belconnen United	JM United (Note: A joint partnership between Juventus and Inter Monaro that was dissolved after 7 matches; West Woden Juventus completed the season)	Belconnen United	7–0	Downer Olympic
1983	Division One	Kambah United (City); West Woden Juventus (Country)	Narrabundah (City); Downer Olympic (Country)	West Woden Juventus	5–4	Canberra Croatia
1984	Division One	Canberra United (City); West Woden Juventus (Country)	Concordia Phillip (City); Croatia Deakin (Country)	West Woden Juventus	3–2	Croatia Deakin
1985	Division One	West Woden Juventus	Croatia Deakin	Belconnen United	3–2	Canberra City Olympians
1986	Division One	Croatia Deakin	Juventus	Juventus	2–1	Belconnen United
1987	Division One	Croatia Deakin	Belconnen United	Croatia Deakin	4–1	Belconnen United
1988	Division One	Croatia Deakin	CCAE	Croatia Deakin	5–3	CCAE
1989	Division One	CCAE	Canberra Croatia	Canberra City Concordia	3–2	Canberra Croatia
1990	Division One	Belconnen United	Canberra City	Belconnen United	1–1 (3–1 (p))	Canberra City
1991	Division One	Tuggeranong United	Olympic	Tuggeranong United	1–0	Olympic
1992	Premier League	AIS	Tuggeranong United	Tuggeranong United	2–0	Belconnen United
1993	Premier League	Olympic	Southern Cross	Olympic	3–3 (5–4 (p))	Southern Cross
1994	Premier League	Canberra Deakin	Tuggeranong United	Olympic	3–1	Tuggeranong United
1995	Premier League	Canberra Deakin	Shamrock Rovers	Canberra Deakin	3–2	Juventus
1996	Premier League	Belconnen United	Canberra Deakin	Belconnen United	1–0	Canberra Deakin
1997	Premier League	Belconnen United	Canberra Olympic	Canberra Olympic	4–0	Canberra Deakin
1998	Premier League	Belconnen United	Monaro Panthers	Belconnen United	2–0	Canberra Olympic
1999	Premier League	Capital City Suns	Weston Creek Royals (Note: Now known as Weston Molonglo FC and associated with Woden-Weston FC)	Monaro Panthers	1–0	Capital City Suns
2000	Premier League	Gungahlin Juventus	Belconnen United	Belconnen United	1–0	Gungahlin Juventus
2001	Premier League	Canberra Deakin	Gungahlin Juventus	Gungahlin Juventus	2–1	Canberra Deakin
2002	Premier League	Canberra Deakin	Gungahlin Juventus	Belconnen United	2–1	Canberra Olympic
2003	Premier League	Canberra Deakin	Canberra Olympic	Canberra Deakin	1–0	Canberra Olympic
2004	Premier League	Canberra Deakin	Gungahlin Juventus	Canberra Deakin	4–1	Gungahlin Juventus
2005	Premier League	Canberra Deakin	O'Connor Knights	Canberra Deakin	1–0	O'Connor Knights
2006	Premier League	Canberra Olympic	Belconnen United	Cooma Tigers	2–1	Canberra Olympic
2007	Premier League	Canberra FC	Belconnen United	Canberra FC	5–4	Belconnen United
2008	Premier League	Canberra FC	Canberra Olympic	Belconnen United	4–1	Canberra FC
2009	Premier League	Canberra FC	Belconnen United	Canberra FC	2–1	Belconnen United
2010	Premier League	Canberra FC	Belconnen United	Canberra FC	6–0	Belconnen United
2011	Premier League	Canberra FC	Canberra Olympic	Canberra FC	8–5	Canberra Olympic
2012	Premier League	Belconnen United	Cooma Tigers	Cooma Tigers	2–1	Belconnen United

=== Pre-NPL all-time record ===
Pre-NPL era Division 1 honours since 1952.

Premierships
Club	Premierships	Years
Canberra FC	20	1962, 1963, 1966, 1969, 1973, 1979, 1986, 1987, 1988, 1995; 2001, 2002, 2003, 2004, 2005, 2007, 2008, 2009, 2010, 2011
Canberra Juventus	13	1964, 1965, 1967, 1968, 1970, 1972, 1974, 1976, 1978, 1983; 1984, 1985, 2000
Belconnen United	6	1982, 1990, 1996, 1997, 1998, 2012
Canberra Olympic	5	1975, 1980, 1993, 1994, 2006
Bohemians	3	1957, 1958, 1959
FTC Hungaria	2	1960, 1961
Napad	2	1954, 1955
Tuggeranong United	2	1983, 1991
AIS	1	1992
Balkan	1	1956
Burns FC	1	1984
Capital City Suns	1	1999
Griffith United	1	1971
Gungahlin United	1	2000
Luso	1	1981
Monaro Panthers	1	1977
UCU Pumas	1	1989

Championships
Club	Championships	Years
Canberra FC	15	1962, 1966, 1967, 1978, 1979, 1987, 1988, 1995, 2003, 2004; 2005, 2007, 2009, 2010, 2011
Canberra Juventus	10	1964, 1965, 1968, 1970, 1975, 1976, 1980, 1983, 1984, 1986
Belconnen United	8	1982, 1985, 1990, 1996, 1998, 2000, 2002, 2008
Canberra Olympic	4	1958, 1993, 1994, 1997
Monaro Panthers	2	1977, 1999
Tigers FC	2	2006, 2012
Tuggeranong United	2	1991, 1992
Canberra City	1	1989
Gungahlin United	1	2001
Hollandia	1	1955
Luso	1	1981
Napad	1	1954

== See also ==
- Soccer in the Australian Capital Territory
- Sport in the Australian Capital Territory
- National Premier Leagues
