= 2025 National Premier Leagues Men's =

National Premier Leagues
- Season: 2025

The 2025 National Premier Leagues was the thirteenth season of the Australian National Premier Leagues soccer competition. The league competition was played by eight separate state and territory member federations. These divisions were ACT, NSW, Northern NSW, Queensland, South Australia, Tasmania, Victoria and Western Australia.

Along with a further eight 'Foundation' clubs (NPL teams from Melbourne, Sydney and Wollongong), the Premiers of each member federation's competition qualified for the 2025 Australian Championship.

== League tables ==
=== Australian Capital Territory ===
Pos	Team	Pld	W	D	L	GF	GA	GD	Pts	Qualification or relegation
1	Canberra Croatia (Q)	21	17	0	4	82	26	+56	51	Qualification to Australian Championship and Finals series
2	Tigers FC (C)	21	13	4	4	50	33	+17	43	Qualification to Finals series
3	Monaro Panthers	21	13	3	5	64	24	+40	42	Qualification to Finals series
4	Tuggeranong United	21	7	6	8	31	50	−19	27	Qualification to Finals series
5	Gungahlin United (W)	21	7	4	10	36	60	−24	25	Licence withdrawn for 2026 NPL season
6	Queanbeyan City	21	6	6	9	20	35	−15	24	
7	Yoogali SC (W)	21	4	3	14	31	49	−18	15	Licence withdrawn at the end of the season
8	O'Connor Knights	21	3	2	16	33	70	−37	11	

Source: Dribl
Rules for classification: 1) Points; 2) Goal difference; 3) Goals scored; 4) Head-to-head points; 5) Head-to-head goals scored; 6) Away head-to-head goals scored; 7) Least red cards; 8) Least yellow cards
(C) Champions; (Q) Qualified for the phase indicated; (W) Withdrawn

==== Finals series ====
Semi-finals
1	Canberra Croatia	2
2	Tigers FC	3
3	Monaro Panthers	5
4	Tuggeranong United	1

Preliminary final
Canberra Croatia	1
Monaro Panthers	2

Grand final
Tigers FC	3
Monaro Panthers	0

=== New South Wales ===
Pos	Team	Pld	W	D	L	GF	GA	GD	Pts	Qualification or relegation
1	NWS Spirit (Q)	30	20	6	4	67	30	+37	66	Qualification to Australian Championship and Finals series
2	APIA Leichhardt (Note: Team pre-qualified to the Australian Championship as a Foundation club.) (C)	30	20	4	6	75	35	+40	64	Qualification to Finals series
3	Marconi Stallions	30	19	5	6	48	29	+19	62	Qualification to Finals series
4	Rockdale Ilinden	30	15	10	5	68	41	+27	55	Qualification to Finals series
5	Blacktown City	30	15	5	10	50	50	0	50	Qualification to Finals series
6	Sydney United 58	30	14	7	9	41	39	+2	49	Qualification to Finals series
7	Sydney Olympic	30	12	7	11	50	38	+12	40 (Note: Western Sydney Wanderers Youth team and Sydney Olympic were deducted three points for breaches of administrative procedures.)	
8	Wollongong Wolves	30	10	10	10	42	38	+4	40	
9	St George City	30	10	7	13	37	42	−5	37	
10	Sydney FC Youth	30	9	7	14	43	46	−3	34	
11	Manly United	30	9	7	14	40	46	−6	34	
12	St George FC	30	8	8	14	44	55	−11	32	
13	Sutherland Sharks	30	7	5	18	28	53	−25	26	
14	Western Sydney Wanderers Youth	30	7	7	16	29	51	−22	25	
15	Central Coast Mariners Academy (R)	30	5	8	17	29	62	−33	23	Qualification for the Relegation play-off
16	Mount Druitt Town Rangers (R)	30	5	7	18	24	60	−36	22	Relegation to 2026 NSW League One

Source: Dribl
Rules for classification: 1) points; 2) goal difference; 3) number of goals scored; 4) head-to-head points; 5) head-to-head goals scored; 6) play-off.
(C) Champions; (Q) Qualified for the phase indicated; (R) Relegated
Notes:

Elimination semi-finals
3	Marconi Stallions (p)	1 (3)
6	Sydney United	1 (2)
4	Rockdale Ilinden	1
5	Blacktown City	0

Preliminary finals
2	APIA Leichhardt	2
3	Marconi Stallions	0
1	NWS Spirit	1
4	Rockdale Ilinden (a.e.t.)	2

Grand final
2	APIA Leichhardt	2
4	Rockdale Ilinden	1

=== Northern New South Wales ===
Pos	Team	Pld	W	D	L	GF	GA	GD	Pts	Qualification or relegation
1	Broadmeadow Magic (C, Q)	22	19	2	1	50	18	+32	59	Qualification to Australian Championship and Finals series
2	Edgeworth FC	22	17	2	3	50	15	+35	53	Qualification to Finals series
3	Weston Bears	22	16	2	4	61	25	+36	50	Qualification to Finals series
4	Lambton Jaffas	22	9	6	7	37	29	+8	33	Qualification to Finals series
5	Maitland FC	22	9	5	8	42	41	+1	32	Qualification to Finals series
6	Newcastle Olympic	22	8	7	7	46	38	+8	31	
7	Charlestown Azzurri	22	6	6	10	32	34	−2	24	
8	Adamstown Rosebud	22	7	2	13	33	47	−14	23	
9	Cooks Hill United	22	7	2	13	26	47	−21	23	
10	Belmont Swansea	22	4	8	10	34	45	−11	20	
11	Valentine FC (O)	22	4	4	14	28	60	−32	16	Qualification for the Relegation play-off
12	New Lambton (R)	22	1	4	17	21	61	−40	7	Relegation to 2026 NNSW Northern League 1

Source: Squadi
(C) Champions; (O) Play-off winners; (Q) Qualified for the phase indicated; (R) Relegated

==== Finals ====
Qualifying final
2	Edgeworth FC	1
3	Weston Bears	2
4	Lambton Jaffas	3
5	Maitland FC	1

Major semi-final
1	Broadmeadow Magic	2
3	Weston Bears	0
Minor semi-final
2	Edgeworth FC	1
4	Lambton Jaffas	3

Preliminary final
Weston Bears	0
Lambton Jaffas	2

Grand final
Broadmeadow Magic	2
Lambton Jaffas	0

=== Queensland ===
Pos	Team	Pld	W	D	L	GF	GA	GD	Pts	Qualification or relegation
1	Moreton City Excelsior (Q)	22	14	5	3	48	23	+25	47	Qualification to Australian Championship and Finals series
2	Lions FC (C)	22	13	3	6	48	29	+19	42	Qualification to Finals series
3	Peninsula Power	22	11	6	5	45	21	+24	39	Qualification to Finals series
4	Eastern Suburbs	22	12	5	5	51	37	+14	38 (Note: Eastern Suburbs were deducted three points for breaches of administrative procedures.)	Qualification to Finals series
5	Gold Coast Knights	22	11	4	7	29	26	+3	37	
6	Olympic FC	22	9	3	10	29	26	+3	30	
7	Brisbane City	22	9	3	10	43	42	+1	30	
8	Wynnum Wolves	22	7	6	9	41	40	+1	27	
9	Gold Coast United	22	8	3	11	25	44	−19	27	
10	Brisbane Roar Youth	22	6	4	12	29	35	−6	22	
11	St George Willawong (R)	22	4	7	11	27	48	−21	19	Relegation to 2026 FQPL 1
12	Sunshine Coast Wanderers (R)	22	2	3	17	20	64	−44	9	Relegation to 2026 FQPL 1

Source: Squadi
Rules for classification: 1) points; 2) goal difference; 3) number of goals scored; 4) head to head record.
(C) Champions; (Q) Qualified for the phase indicated; (R) Relegated
Notes:

Semi-finals
1	Moreton City Excelsior	4
4	Eastern Suburbs	1
2	Lions FC	3
3	Peninsula Power	0

Grand final
Moreton City Excelsior	1
Lions FC	2

=== South Australia ===
Pos	Team	Pld	W	D	L	GF	GA	GD	Pts	Qualification or relegation
1	North Eastern MetroStars (Q)	22	16	4	2	55	20	+35	52	Qualification to Australian Championship and finals
2	Adelaide City	22	12	3	7	43	30	+13	39	Qualification to Finals series
3	Croydon FC (C)	22	12	2	8	43	34	+9	38	Qualification to Finals series
4	FK Beograd	22	12	1	9	43	32	+11	37	Qualification to Finals series
5	Adelaide United Youth	22	9	5	8	40	44	−4	32	Qualification to Finals series
6	West Torrens Birkalla	22	9	4	9	33	35	−2	31	Qualification to Finals series
7	Campbelltown City	22	9	3	10	36	46	−10	30	
8	Playford City	22	9	2	11	45	41	+4	29	
9	Adelaide Comets	22	9	2	11	26	34	−8	29	
10	Para Hills Knights	22	6	5	11	37	56	−19	23	
11	Modbury Jets (R)	22	6	4	12	27	32	−5	22	Relegation to SA State League 1
12	Adelaide Croatia Raiders (R)	22	4	3	15	24	48	−24	15	Relegation to SA State League 1

Source: Dribl
Rules for classification: 1) points; 2) goal difference; 3) number of goals scored; 4) head to head record; 5) playoff match.
(C) Champions; (Q) Qualified for the phase indicated; (R) Relegated

Elimination Finals
4	FK Beograd	1
5	Adelaide United Youth	2
3	Croydon FC (p)	4
6	West Torrens Birkalla	1

Semi-finals
5	Adelaide United Youth	0	1	1
1	North Eastern MetroStars	1	2	3
3	Croydon FC (p)	1	0	1 (3)
2	Adelaide City	1	0	1 (2)

Grand Final
1	North Eastern MetroStars	1
3	Croydon FC	2

=== Tasmania ===
Pos	Team	Pld	W	D	L	GF	GA	GD	Pts	Qualification
1	South Hobart (C, Q)	21	17	3	1	84	20	+64	54	Qualification to Australian Championship
2	Launceston City	21	16	2	3	82	22	+60	50	
3	Kingborough Lions United	21	13	2	6	45	33	+12	41	
4	Devonport City	21	10	5	6	57	32	+25	35	
5	Glenorchy Knights	21	10	3	8	50	43	+7	33	
6	Riverside Olympic	21	5	1	15	26	55	−29	16	
7	Launceston United	21	3	1	17	26	101	−75	10	
8	Clarence Zebras	21	1	1	19	19	83	−64	4	

Source: Dribl
Rules for classification: 1) Points; 2) Goal difference; 3) Goals scored; 4) Head-to-head points; 5) Head-to-head goals scored; 6) Play-off match
(C) Champions; (Q) Qualified for the phase indicated

=== Victoria ===
Pos	Team	Pld	W	D	L	GF	GA	GD	Pts	Promotion, qualification or relegation
1	Avondale FC (Note: Team pre-qualified to the Australian Championship as a Foundation club.)	26	19	4	3	66	27	+39	61	Qualification to Finals series
2	Heidelberg United (C, Q)	26	17	6	3	55	25	+30	57	Qualification to Australian Championship and Finals series (Note: The second-placed team qualified to the Australian Championship since the Premier is one of the three NPL Victoria teams that have already qualified as "Foundation Clubs".)
3	Dandenong Thunder	26	16	5	5	60	32	+28	53	Qualification to Finals series
4	Oakleigh Cannons	26	15	4	7	58	33	+25	49	Qualification to Finals series
5	Preston Lions	26	14	5	7	40	28	+12	47	Qualification to Finals series
6	Dandenong City	26	10	10	6	51	38	+13	40	Qualification to Finals series
7	Hume City	26	11	5	10	42	40	+2	38	
8	Green Gully	26	8	7	11	39	42	−3	31	
9	South Melbourne	26	7	7	12	29	46	−17	28	
10	Altona Magic	26	7	6	13	28	38	−10	27	
11	St Albans Saints	26	7	6	13	45	56	−11	27	
12	Melbourne Victory Youth (R)	26	5	3	18	36	60	−24	18	Relegation to Victorian Premier League 1
13	Port Melbourne (R)	26	4	5	17	24	64	−40	17	Relegation to Victorian Premier League 1
14	Melbourne Knights (R)	26	4	3	19	28	72	−44	15	Relegation to Victorian Premier League 1

Source: MyGameday
Rules for classification: 1) points; 2) goal difference; 3) number of goals scored; 4) aggregate head-to-head results; 5) away goals; 6) alphabetical order/coin toss at the end of the season.
(C) Champions; (Q) Qualified for the phase indicated; (R) Relegated

==== Finals series ====
Elimination finals
3	Dandenong Thunder	0
6	Dandenong City	1
4	Oakleigh Cannons	1
5	Preston Lions	2

Preliminary finals
1	Avondale FC	0
6	Dandenong City	1
2	Heidelberg United	2
5	Preston Lions	1

Grand final
6	Dandenong City	1
2	Heidelberg United	2

=== Western Australia ===
The competition was held as a double round-robin played over 22 rounds, followed by an end of season Finals competition.

Pos	Team	Pld	W	D	L	GF	GA	GD	Pts	Qualification or relegation
1	Bayswater City (C, Q)	22	16	4	2	53	16	+37	52	Qualification to Australian Championship and Finals series
2	Olympic Kingsway	22	16	3	3	53	22	+31	51	Qualification to Finals series
3	Perth RedStar	22	13	5	4	33	23	+10	44	Qualification to Finals series
4	Perth Glory Youth	22	12	4	6	52	30	+22	40	Qualification to Finals series
5	Stirling Macedonia	22	10	5	7	50	38	+12	35	
6	Perth SC	22	8	6	8	41	43	−2	30	
7	Western Knights	22	7	5	10	34	43	−9	26	
8	Armadale SC	22	6	5	11	34	51	−17	23	
9	Sorrento FC	22	6	4	12	27	38	−11	22	
10	Balcatta FC	22	5	5	12	22	45	−23	20	
11	Fremantle City (O)	22	5	4	13	26	48	−22	19	Qualification for the Relegation play-off
12	Floreat Athena (R)	22	0	6	16	23	51	−28	6	Relegation to the 2026 State League 1

Source: squadi
Rules for classification: 1) points; 2) goal difference; 3) number of goals scored.
(C) Champions; (O) Play-off winners; (Q) Qualified for the phase indicated; (R) Relegated

==== Finals ====
Semi-finals
1	Bayswater City	1
2	Olympic Kingsway	0
3	Perth RedStar	2 (2)
4	Perth Glory Youth (p)	2 (4)

Preliminary Final
Olympic Kingsway	4
Perth Glory Youth	0

Grand Final
Bayswater City	2
Olympic Kingsway	1

== Qualified teams for the Australian Championship ==
In addition to the Foundation Clubs, the following teams qualified for the 2025 Australian Championship:

Competition	Club
2025 NPL Capital Football	Canberra Croatia
2025 NPL NSW	NWS Spirit
2025 NPL Northern NSW	Broadmeadow Magic
2025 NPL Queensland	Moreton City Excelsior
2025 NPL South Australia	North Eastern MetroStars
2025 NPL Tasmania	South Hobart
2025 NPL Victoria	Heidelberg United (Note: As the 2025 NPL Victoria premiers, Avondale FC, had already qualified as a foundation club, their berth went to the league's second-placed team Heidelberg United.)
2025 NPL Western Australia	Bayswater City
