= 2024 National Premier Leagues Men's =

National Premier Leagues
- Season: 2024

The 2024 National Premier Leagues was the twelfth season of the Australian National Premier Leagues soccer competition. The league competition was played by eight separate state and territory member federations. The divisions are ACT, NSW, Northern NSW, Queensland, South Australia, Tasmania, Victoria and Western Australia.

== League tables ==
=== Australian Capital Territory ===
Pos	Team	Pld	W	D	L	GF	GA	GD	Pts	Qualification or relegation
1	Gungahlin United	21	15	2	4	55	25	+30	47	Qualification to Finals series
2	Canberra Croatia (C)	21	14	2	5	51	29	+22	44	Qualification to Finals series
3	O'Connor Knights	21	12	4	5	44	34	+10	40	Qualification to Finals series
4	Tigers FC	21	10	4	7	45	31	+14	34	Qualification to Finals series
5	Monaro Panthers	21	8	5	8	33	25	+8	29	
6	Tuggeranong United	21	7	5	9	31	34	−3	26	
7	Yoogali SC	21	3	2	16	14	63	−49	11	
8	Canberra Olympic (R)	21	3	0	18	27	59	−32	9	Relegation to Capital Premier League

Rules for classification: 1) Points; 2) Goal difference; 3) Goals scored; 4) Head-to-head points; 5) Head-to-head goals scored; 6) Away head-to-head goals scored; 7) Least red cards; 8) Least yellow cards
(C) Champions; (R) Relegated

==== Finals series ====
Semi-finals
1	Gungahlin United	1 (4)
2	Canberra Croatia (p)	1 (5)
3	O'Connor Knights	1
4	Tigers FC	3

Preliminary final
1	Gungahlin United	0
4	Tigers FC	1

Grand final
2	Canberra Croatia	4
4	Tigers FC	3

=== New South Wales ===
Pos	Team	Pld	W	D	L	GF	GA	GD	Pts	Qualification or relegation
1	Rockdale Ilinden	30	23	3	4	76	40	+36	72	Qualification for the Finals series
2	Marconi Stallions (C)	30	21	2	7	70	35	+35	65	Qualification for the Finals series
3	APIA Leichhardt	30	18	3	9	78	48	+30	57	Qualification for the Finals series
4	Blacktown City	30	17	6	7	66	37	+29	57	Qualification for the Finals series
5	St George City	30	16	3	11	46	40	+6	51	Qualification for the Finals series
6	Sydney United	30	15	5	10	45	40	+5	50	Qualification for the Finals series
7	Wollongong Wolves	30	13	5	12	55	41	+14	44	
8	Sydney Olympic	30	13	3	14	51	42	+9	42	
9	Manly United	30	10	5	15	33	50	−17	35	
10	NWS Spirit	30	10	4	16	39	53	−14	34	
11	Western Sydney Wanderers Youth	30	12	2	16	62	68	−6	32 (Note: Western Sydney Wanderers were deducted six points for breaches of the grievance and disciplinary regulations. In addition, they were fined $33,500 and given 'restricted access' for away supporters.)	
12	St George FC	30	8	8	14	37	58	−21	32	
13	Sutherland Sharks	30	7	8	15	32	49	−17	29	
14	Sydney FC Youth	30	8	5	17	39	67	−28	29	
15	Central Coast Mariners Academy (O)	30	8	4	18	42	67	−25	28	Qualification for the Relegation play-off
16	Hills United (R)	30	8	0	22	35	71	−36	24	Relegation to 2025 NSW League One

Source: Football NSW
Rules for classification: 1) Points; 2) Goal difference; 3) Goals scored; 4) Head-to-head points; 5) Head-to-head goals scored; 6) Play-off match
(C) Champions; (O) Play-off winners; (R) Relegated
Notes:

Elimination semi-finals
3	APIA Leichhardt	1
6	Sydney United	2
4	Blacktown City	4
5	St George City	2

Preliminary finals
1	Rockdale Ilinden	3
6	Sydney United	1
2	Marconi Stallions	6
4	Blacktown City	2

Grand final
1	Rockdale Ilinden	0
2	Marconi Stallions	3

=== Northern New South Wales ===
Pos	Team	Pld	W	D	L	GF	GA	GD	Pts	Qualification or relegation
1	Broadmeadow Magic (C)	22	18	1	3	76	27	+49	55	Qualification to Finals series
2	Lambton Jaffas	22	17	1	4	51	20	+31	52	Qualification to Finals series
3	Edgeworth FC	22	14	3	5	47	23	+24	45	Qualification to Finals series
4	Charlestown Azzurri	22	13	3	6	35	20	+15	42	Qualification to Finals series
5	Newcastle Olympic	22	12	3	7	37	26	+11	39	Qualification to Finals series
6	Weston Workers	22	11	1	10	42	27	+15	34	
7	Cooks Hill United	22	9	4	9	50	38	+12	31	
8	Valentine FC	22	9	3	10	35	36	−1	30	
9	Maitland FC	22	7	4	11	40	48	−8	25	
10	New Lambton	22	4	3	15	19	47	−28	15	
11	Adamstown Rosebud	22	2	3	17	17	77	−60	9	
12	Lake Macquarie City (R)	22	1	1	20	16	76	−60	4	Relegation to 2025 NNSW Northern League 1

Source: Squadi
Rules for classification: 1) Points; 2) Goal difference; 3) Goals scored; 4) Head-to-head points; 5) Head-to-head points; 6) Head-to-head goal difference; 7) Least red cards; 8) Least yellow cards; 9) Toss of a coin
(C) Champions; (R) Relegated

==== Finals series ====
Qualifying final
2	Lambton Jaffas	0
3	Edgeworth FC	2
4	Charlestown Azzurri	2
5	Newcastle Olympic	0

Major semi-final
1	Broadmeadow Magic	2
2	Edgeworth FC	0
Minor semi-final
3	Lambton Jaffas	0
5	Charlestown Azzurri	4

Preliminary final
2	Edgeworth FC	3
3	Charlestown Azzurri	1

Grand final
1	Broadmeadow Magic (p)	2 (4)
2	Edgeworth FC	2 (3)

=== Queensland ===
Pos	Team	Pld	W	D	L	GF	GA	GD	Pts	Qualification or relegation
1	Gold Coast Knights	22	19	1	2	63	25	+38	58	Qualification for Finals
2	Moreton City Excelsior	22	15	4	3	60	26	+34	49	Qualification for Finals
3	Peninsula Power	22	15	2	5	50	25	+25	47	Qualification for Finals
4	Lions FC (C)	22	13	3	6	62	31	+31	42	Qualification for Finals
5	Wynnum Wolves	22	11	2	9	43	62	−19	35	
6	Olympic FC	22	7	5	10	32	32	0	26	
7	Gold Coast United	22	5	9	8	29	33	−4	24	
8	Brisbane Roar Youth	22	6	6	10	33	43	−10	24	
9	Sunshine Coast Wanderers	22	6	4	12	28	44	−16	22	
10	Brisbane City	22	6	2	14	28	44	−16	20	
11	Rochedale Rovers (R)	22	4	4	14	18	47	−29	16	Relegation to 2025 FQPL 1
12	Redlands United (R)	22	1	6	15	19	53	−34	9	Relegation to 2025 FQPL 1

Source: squadi
Rules for classification: 1) points; 2) goal difference; 3) number of goals scored; 4) head to head record.
(C) Champions; (R) Relegated

==== Finals series ====
Semifinals
1	Gold Coast Knights	0
4	Lions FC	1
2	Moreton City Excelsior (a.e.t.)	4
3	Peninsula Power	3

Grand final
4	Lions FC	1
2	Moreton City Excelsior	0

=== South Australia ===
Pos	Team	Pld	W	D	L	GF	GA	GD	Pts	Qualification or relegation
1	North Eastern MetroStars	22	12	7	3	51	28	+23	43	Qualification for Finals
2	Campbelltown City (C)	22	11	8	3	45	30	+15	41	Qualification for Finals
3	Modbury Jets	22	11	5	6	51	34	+17	38	Qualification for Finals
4	Adelaide City	22	11	2	9	39	29	+10	35	Qualification for Finals
5	Adelaide Comets	22	8	8	6	43	30	+13	32	Qualification for Finals
6	Adelaide United Youth	22	9	5	8	51	57	−6	32	Qualification for Finals
7	FK Beograd	22	8	5	9	39	38	+1	29	
8	Croydon FC	22	8	5	9	38	48	−10	29	
9	Adelaide Croatia Raiders	22	7	4	11	38	41	−3	25	
10	Para Hills Knights	22	6	7	9	33	40	−7	25	
11	Adelaide Olympic (R)	22	7	3	12	28	48	−20	24	Relegation to SA State League 1
12	South Adelaide Panthers (R)	22	2	5	15	30	63	−33	11	Relegation to SA State League 1

Source: Dribl
Rules for classification: 1) points; 2) goal difference; 3) number of goals scored; 4) head to head record; 5) playoff match.
(C) Champions; (R) Relegated

Elimination Finals
4	Adelaide City	2
5	Adelaide Comets	1
3	Modbury Jets (a.e.t.)	3
6	Adelaide United Youth	2

Semi-finals
4	Adelaide City	0	0	0
1	North Eastern MetroStars	0	2	2
3	Modbury Jets	0	0	0
2	Campbelltown City	2	3	5

Grand Final
1	North Eastern MetroStars	1
2	Campbelltown City	3

=== Tasmania ===
Pos	Team	Pld	W	D	L	GF	GA	GD	Pts
1	Glenorchy Knights (C)	21	14	5	2	81	24	+57	47
2	South Hobart	21	14	5	2	58	29	+29	47
3	Devonport City	21	13	6	2	60	19	+41	45
4	Kingborough Lions United	21	11	3	7	66	43	+23	36
5	Launceston City	21	9	4	8	38	34	+4	31
6	Riverside Olympic	21	6	1	14	27	62	−35	19
7	Clarence Zebras	21	3	2	16	28	60	−32	11
8	Launceston United	21	1	0	20	17	104	−87	3

Source: Dribl
Rules for classification: 1) Points; 2) Goal difference; 3) Goals scored; 4) Head-to-head points; 5) Head-to-head goals scored; 6) Play-off match
(C) Champions

=== Victoria ===
Pos	Team	Pld	W	D	L	GF	GA	GD	Pts	Qualification or relegation
1	South Melbourne	26	19	3	4	53	20	+33	60	2024 NPL Victoria Finals
2	Avondale FC	26	16	6	4	65	29	+36	54	2024 NPL Victoria Finals
3	Oakleigh Cannons (C)	26	16	5	5	53	28	+25	53	2024 NPL Victoria Finals
4	Heidelberg United	26	14	9	3	46	21	+25	51	2024 NPL Victoria Finals
5	Hume City	26	15	5	6	50	29	+21	50	2024 NPL Victoria Finals
6	Dandenong City	26	11	4	11	50	51	−1	37	2024 NPL Victoria Finals
7	Melbourne Knights	26	10	5	11	43	37	+6	35	
8	Altona Magic	26	10	3	13	43	50	−7	33	
9	Port Melbourne	26	9	6	11	41	52	−11	33	
10	Dandenong Thunder	26	8	4	14	29	51	−22	28	
11	St Albans Saints	26	8	1	17	30	54	−24	25	
12	Green Gully	26	6	6	14	34	53	−19	24	
13	Manningham United Blues (R)	26	5	3	18	42	72	−30	18	Relegation to the National Premier Leagues Victoria 2
14	Moreland City (R)	26	4	2	20	36	68	−32	14	Relegation to the National Premier Leagues Victoria 2

Rules for classification: 1) points; 2) goal difference; 3) number of goals scored.
(C) Champions; (R) Relegated

==== Finals series ====
Elimination finals
4	Heidelberg United	1 (4)
5	Hume City (p)	1 (5)
3	Oakleigh Cannons	4
6	Dandenong City	1

Preliminary finals
1	South Melbourne (a.e.t.)	1
5	Hume City	0
2	Avondale FC	0
3	Oakleigh Cannons	3

Grand final
1	South Melbourne	0
3	Oakleigh Cannons	1

=== Western Australia ===
The competition was held as a double round-robin played over 22 rounds, completed on 31 August, followed by an end of season finals competition.

Pos	Team	Pld	W	D	L	GF	GA	GD	Pts	Qualification or relegation
1	Olympic Kingsway (C)	22	16	4	2	60	27	+33	52	2024 NPL WA Finals
2	Perth RedStar	22	14	4	4	44	29	+15	46	2024 NPL WA Finals
3	Fremantle City	22	11	3	8	46	36	+10	36	2024 NPL WA Finals
4	Stirling Macedonia	22	11	3	8	42	40	+2	36	2024 NPL WA Finals
5	Bayswater City	22	9	6	7	53	39	+14	33	
6	Floreat Athena	22	11	3	8	43	33	+10	33 (Note: Floreat Athena were deducted six points (three suspended) for breaches of the codes of conduct and spectator code of behaviour.)	
7	Armadale SC	22	8	7	7	54	43	+11	31	
8	Western Knights	22	8	5	9	35	33	+2	29	
9	Balcatta FC	22	6	6	10	30	42	−12	24	
10	Perth SC	22	6	5	11	45	54	−9	23	
11	Perth Glory Youth (O)	22	3	5	14	35	68	−33	14	Qualification for relegation play-off
12	Inglewood United (R)	22	2	3	17	23	66	−43	9	Relegation to 2025 WA State League 1

Rules for classification: 1) points; 2) goal difference; 3) number of goals scored.
(C) Champions; (O) Play-off winners; (R) Relegated

==== Finals ====
Semi-finals
1	Olympic Kingsway (p)	1 (6)
2	Perth RedStar	1 (5)
3	Fremantle City	2
4	Stirling Macedonia	3

Preliminary Final
2	Perth RedStar	0
4	Stirling Macedonia	3

Grand Final
1	Olympic Kingsway (a.e.t.)	3
4	Stirling Macedonia	2
