= 2022 National Premier Leagues =

National Premier Leagues
- Season: 2022

The 2022 National Premier Leagues was the tenth season of the Australian National Premier Leagues soccer competition. The league competition was played by eight separate state and territory member federations. The divisions are ACT, NSW, Northern NSW, Queensland, South Australia, Tasmania, Victoria and Western Australia.

== League tables ==
=== ACT ===
Pos	Team	Pld	W	D	L	GF	GA	GD	Pts	Qualification or relegation
1	Canberra Croatia	21	14	5	2	56	16	+40	44 (Note: Canberra Croatia were deducted 3 points for crowd issues.)	2022 NPL ACT Finals
2	Gungahlin United	21	12	4	5	49	30	+19	40	2022 NPL ACT Finals
3	Monaro Panthers (C)	21	9	8	4	34	18	+16	35	2022 NPL ACT Finals
4	O'Connor Knights	21	8	3	10	36	46	−10	27	2022 NPL ACT Finals
5	Canberra Olympic	21	7	5	9	35	45	−10	26	
6	Cooma Tigers	21	4	10	7	30	41	−11	22	
7	West Canberra Wanderers	21	4	5	12	25	44	−19	17	
8	Belconnen United (R)	21	4	4	13	25	50	−25	16	Relegation to the 2023 NPL ACT 2

Source: Dribl
Rules for classification: 1) points; 2) goal difference; 3) number of goals scored.
(C) Champions; (R) Relegated

==== Finals ====
Semi-finals
1	Canberra Croatia	3
2	Gungahlin United	2
3	Monaro Panthers	2
4	O'Connor Knights	0

Preliminary final
Gungahlin United	0
Monaro Panthers	2

Grand final
Canberra Croatia	1
Monaro Panthers	2

=== NSW ===
Pos	Team	Pld	W	D	L	GF	GA	GD	Pts	Qualification or relegation
1	Sydney Olympic	22	12	5	5	40	27	+13	41	2022 NPL NSW Finals
2	Manly United	22	12	5	5	36	24	+12	41	2022 NPL NSW Finals
3	Blacktown City (C)	22	12	4	6	43	25	+18	40	2022 NPL NSW Finals
4	Marconi Stallions	22	11	7	4	43	31	+12	40	2022 NPL NSW Finals
5	APIA Leichhardt Tigers	22	10	5	7	41	33	+8	35	2022 NPL NSW Finals
6	Rockdale Ilinden	22	10	5	7	39	36	+3	35	
7	Sydney FC Youth	22	8	8	6	53	45	+8	32	
8	Sydney United 58	22	8	5	9	32	42	−10	29	
9	Wollongong Wolves	22	4	8	10	37	42	−5	20	
10	Mt Druitt Town Rangers	22	4	7	11	37	52	−15	19	
11	Northbridge Bulls	22	5	3	14	32	57	−25	18	
12	Sutherland Sharks	22	3	4	15	28	47	−19	13	

Source: Ladder
Rules for classification: 1) points; 2) goal difference; 3) number of goals scored.
(C) Champions

==== Finals ====
Qualifying Final
2	Manly United (a.e.t.)	2
3	Blacktown City	1
4	Marconi Stallions	0
5	APIA Leichhardt	1

Major Semi-Final
1	Sydney Olympic	1 (3)
2	Manly United	1 (4)
Minor Semi-Final
3	Blacktown City	2
5	APIA Leichhardt	0

Preliminary final
1	Sydney Olympic	1 (4)
3	Blacktown City	1 (5)

Grand Final
2	Manly United	0
3	Blacktown City	2

=== Northern NSW ===
Pos	Team	Pld	W	D	L	GF	GA	GD	Pts	Qualification or relegation
1	Maitland FC	20	13	3	4	57	32	+25	42	2022 NPL Northern NSW Finals
2	Broadmeadow Magic	20	13	2	5	49	17	+32	41	2022 NPL Northern NSW Finals
3	Lambton Jaffas (C)	20	11	5	4	44	18	+26	38	2022 NPL Northern NSW Finals
4	Charlestown Azzurri	20	9	7	4	44	30	+14	34	2022 NPL Northern NSW Finals
5	Newcastle Olympic	20	10	4	6	37	25	+12	34	2022 NPL Northern NSW Finals
6	Valentine Phoenix	20	10	1	9	30	34	−4	31	
7	Edgeworth FC	20	10	2	8	33	35	−2	32	
8	Weston Workers	20	8	2	10	32	34	−2	26	
9	Cooks Hill United	20	6	3	11	36	43	−7	21	
10	Adamstown Rosebud	20	2	2	16	19	64	−45	8	
11	Lake Macquarie City	20	2	1	17	15	64	−49	7	

Source: mygameday
Rules for classification: 1) points; 2) goal difference; 3) number of goals scored.
(C) Champions

==== Finals ====
Qualifying final
2	Broadmeadow Magic	2
3	Lambton Jaffas	1
4	Charlestown Azzurri	0
5	Newcastle Olympic (a.e.t.)	1

Major semi-final
1	Maitland FC	4
Broadmeadow Magic	1
Minor semi-final
Lambton Jaffas	2
Newcastle Olympic	0

Preliminary final
Broadmeadow Magic	1
Lambton Jaffas	2

Grand final
Maitland FC	0
Lambton Jaffas	1

=== Queensland ===
Pos	Team	Pld	W	D	L	GF	GA	GD	Pts	Qualification or relegation
1	Lions FC	22	16	3	3	74	32	+42	51	2022 NPL Queensland Finals
2	Gold Coast Knights (C)	22	11	6	5	44	27	+17	39	2022 NPL Queensland Finals
3	Peninsula Power	22	12	3	7	50	35	+15	39	2022 NPL Queensland Finals
4	Olympic FC	22	11	5	6	54	37	+17	38	2022 NPL Queensland Finals
5	Brisbane City	22	10	3	9	49	40	+9	33	
6	Gold Coast United	22	9	5	8	37	34	+3	32	
7	Eastern Suburbs	22	9	4	9	41	49	−8	31	
8	Sunshine Coast Wanderers	22	7	9	6	37	38	−1	30	
9	Moreton Bay United	22	8	4	10	49	38	+11	28	
10	Logan Lightning (R)	22	7	5	10	32	52	−20	26	Relegation to the 2023 Queensland Premier League 1
11	Brisbane Roar Youth	22	4	4	14	29	58	−29	16	
12	Capalaba (R)	22	0	5	17	24	80	−56	5	Relegation to the 2023 Queensland Premier League 1

Source: mygameday
Rules for classification: 1) points; 2) goal difference; 3) number of goals scored.
(C) Champions; (R) Relegated

==== Finals ====
Semi-finals
1	Lions FC	2
4	Olympic FC	3
2	Gold Coast Knights	3
3	Peninsula Power	2

Grand final
4	Olympic FC	0
2	Gold Coast Knights	2

=== South Australia ===
Pos	Team	Pld	W	D	L	GF	GA	GD	Pts	Qualification or relegation
1	Adelaide City (C)	22	15	6	1	55	17	+38	51	Qualification for Finals
2	Campbelltown City	22	16	2	4	44	27	+17	50	Qualification for Finals
3	Adelaide Comets	22	14	3	5	47	21	+26	45	Qualification for Finals
4	North Eastern MetroStars	22	13	2	7	38	25	+13	41	Qualification for Finals
5	Adelaide United Youth	22	10	2	10	55	55	0	32	Qualification for Finals
6	Croydon FC	22	9	3	10	28	27	+1	30	Qualification for Finals
7	FK Beograd	22	8	5	9	35	39	−4	29	
8	Sturt Lions	22	7	4	11	29	44	−15	25	
9	South Adelaide Panthers	22	6	4	12	38	49	−11	22	
10	Adelaide Olympic	22	5	5	12	32	45	−13	20	
11	Cumberland United (R)	22	5	2	15	24	53	−29	17	Relegation to SA State League 1
12	West Torrens Birkalla (R)	22	3	4	15	24	47	−23	13	Relegation to SA State League 1

Source: mygameday
Rules for classification: 1) points; 2) goal difference; 3) number of goals scored.
(C) Champions; (R) Relegated

==== Finals ====
Elimination finals
3	Adelaide Comets	1
6	Croydon FC	0
4	North Eastern MetroStars	2
5	Adelaide United Youth	1

Semifinals
1	Adelaide City	0	3
2	Campbelltown City	0	2
3	Adelaide Comets (p)	0 (6)
4	North Eastern MetroStars	0 (5)

Preliminary final
2	Campbelltown City	0
3	Adelaide Comets	1

Grand final
1	Adelaide City	2
3	Adelaide Comets	1

=== Tasmania ===
Pos	Team	Pld	W	D	L	GF	GA	GD	Pts
1	Devonport City (C)	21	19	1	1	71	11	+60	58
2	South Hobart	21	14	3	4	64	23	+41	45
3	Kingborough Lions United	21	13	2	6	53	32	+21	41
4	Glenorchy Knights	21	13	1	7	45	25	+20	40
5	Launceston City	21	9	2	10	34	44	−10	29
6	Clarence Zebras	21	5	2	14	35	52	−17	17
7	Olympia Warriors	21	3	0	18	21	69	−48	9
8	Riverside Olympic	21	1	3	17	12	79	−67	6

Source: GameDay and Walter Pless
Rules for classification: 1) Points; 2) Goal difference; 3) Goals scored
(C) Champions

=== Victoria ===
Pos	Team	Pld	W	D	L	GF	GA	GD	Pts	Qualification or relegation
1	South Melbourne	26	20	2	4	59	20	+39	62	2022 NPL Victoria Finals
2	Port Melbourne	26	17	5	4	45	23	+22	56	2022 NPL Victoria Finals
3	Oakleigh Cannons	26	16	3	7	58	29	+29	51	2022 NPL Victoria Finals
4	Green Gully	26	14	3	9	43	30	+13	45	2022 NPL Victoria Finals
5	Bentleigh Greens	26	12	6	8	47	33	+14	42	2022 NPL Victoria Finals
6	Heidelberg United	26	13	3	10	50	43	+7	42	2022 NPL Victoria Finals
7	Avondale	26	12	4	10	49	38	+11	40	
8	Dandenong Thunder	26	11	5	10	37	34	+3	38	
9	Melbourne Knights	26	9	3	14	36	40	−4	30	
10	St Albans Saints	26	8	6	12	25	38	−13	30	
11	Altona Magic	26	8	3	15	21	38	−17	27	
12	Hume City	26	7	5	14	33	48	−15	26	
13	Dandenong City (R)	26	5	5	16	24	60	−36	20	Relegation to the 2023 NPL Victoria 2
14	Eastern Lions (R)	26	1	5	20	17	70	−53	8	Relegation to the 2023 NPL Victoria 2

Source: mygameday
Rules for classification: 1) points; 2) goal difference; 3) number of goals scored.
(R) Relegated

==== Finals ====
Elimination finals
4	Green Gully	2
5	Bentleigh Greens	0
3	Oakleigh Cannons	3 (3)
6	Heidelberg United	3 (1)

Preliminary finals
1	South Melbourne	1
4	Green Gully	0
2	Port Melbourne	1
3	Oakleigh Cannons (a.e.t.)	2

Grand final
1	South Melbourne	0
3	Oakleigh Cannons	5

=== Western Australia ===
Pos	Team	Pld	W	D	L	GF	GA	GD	Pts	Qualification or relegation
1	Floreat Athena	22	14	5	3	54	35	+19	47	2022 NPL WA Finals
2	Perth RedStar (C)	22	15	0	7	62	32	+30	45	2022 NPL WA Finals
3	Stirling Macedonia	22	13	4	5	29	22	+7	43	2022 NPL WA Finals
4	Sorrento FC	22	12	4	6	50	34	+16	40	2022 NPL WA Finals
5	Bayswater City	22	11	6	5	51	37	+14	39	
6	Inglewood United	22	9	3	10	26	27	−1	30	
7	Armadale SC	22	8	5	9	39	44	−5	29	
8	Perth Glory Youth	22	8	4	10	32	39	−7	28	
9	Perth SC	22	7	6	9	35	29	+6	27	
10	Cockburn City	22	5	7	10	29	38	−9	22	
11	Balcatta FC	22	3	4	15	17	51	−34	13	
12	Gwelup Croatia (R)	22	1	4	17	18	54	−36	7	Relegation to the 2023 WA State League 1

Source: mygameday
Rules for classification: 1) points; 2) goal difference; 3) number of goals scored.
(C) Champions; (R) Relegated

==== Finals ====
Semi-finals
1	Floreat Athena	2
2	Perth RedStar	1
3	Stirling Macedonia	0
4	Sorrento FC	2

Preliminary Final
Perth RedStar	3
Sorrento FC	2

Grand Final
Floreat Athena	2
Perth RedStar	3
