= 2023 National Premier Leagues Men's =

National Premier Leagues
- Season: 2023

The 2023 National Premier Leagues was the eleventh season of the Australian National Premier Leagues soccer competition. The league competition was played by eight separate state and territory member federations. The divisions are ACT, NSW, Northern NSW, Queensland, South Australia, Tasmania, Victoria and Western Australia.

== League Tables ==
=== Australian Capital Territory ===
Pos	Team	Pld	W	D	L	GF	GA	GD	Pts	Qualification or relegation
1	O'Connor Knights	21	16	3	2	58	18	+40	51	2023 NPL ACT Finals
2	Gungahlin United	21	11	3	7	58	42	+16	36	2023 NPL ACT Finals
3	Canberra Olympic	21	11	3	7	42	35	+7	36	2023 NPL ACT Finals
4	Canberra Croatia	21	10	5	6	63	34	+29	35	2023 NPL ACT Finals
5	Monaro Panthers	21	11	2	8	39	27	+12	35	
6	Cooma Tigers	21	11	2	8	53	44	+9	35	
7	Tuggeranong United	21	4	2	15	25	65	−40	14	
8	West Canberra Wanderers (R)	21	0	0	21	17	90	−73	0	Relegation to the 2024 Capital Premier League

Source: dribl
Rules for classification: 1) points; 2) goal difference; 3) number of goals scored.
(R) Relegated

==== Finals ====
Semi-finals
1	O'Connor Knights	2
2	Gungahlin United	1
3	Canberra Olympic	0 (1)
4	Canberra Croatia	0 (3)

Preliminary final
2	Gungahlin United	2
4	Canberra Croatia	5

Grand final
1	O'Connor Knights	1 (5)
4	Canberra Croatia	1 (6)

=== New South Wales ===
Football NSW have re-organised the leagues for the 2023 season, reducing the number of leagues from four to three while increasing their size to 16 teams. In the prior season there was no relegation, with four teams promoted from League One to the NPL competition.

Pos	Team	Pld	W	D	L	GF	GA	GD	Pts	Qualification or relegation
1	APIA Leichhardt (C)	30	20	5	5	64	35	+29	65	
2	Rockdale Ilinden	30	18	5	7	60	45	+15	59	
3	Blacktown City	30	17	6	7	59	33	+26	57	
4	Marconi Stallions	30	17	5	8	64	35	+29	56	
5	St George City	30	14	9	7	62	40	+22	51	
6	Sydney FC Youth	30	14	4	12	49	52	−3	46	
7	Wollongong Wolves	30	11	10	9	57	43	+14	43	
8	Manly United	30	12	6	12	41	43	−2	42	
9	Sydney Olympic	30	10	9	11	51	53	−2	39	
10	Sydney United	30	11	6	13	42	48	−6	39	
11	NWS Spirit	30	11	6	13	40	53	−13	39	
12	Central Coast Mariners Academy	30	9	6	15	42	57	−15	33	
13	Western Sydney Wanderers Youth	30	8	7	15	52	61	−9	31	
14	Sutherland Sharks	30	8	7	15	21	35	−14	31	
15	Mt Druitt Town Rangers (R)	30	6	5	19	31	61	−30	23	Qualification to Relegation play-off
16	Bulls FC Academy (R)	30	3	6	21	24	65	−41	15	Relegation to 2024 NSW League One

Source: Ladder
Rules for classification: 1) Points; 2) Goal difference; 3) Number of goals scored; 4) Points gained in head-to-head record between teams; 5) Number of goals scored in head-to-head record between teams; 6) Play-off if teams concerned are equal on the basis of the above criteria
(C) Champions; (R) Relegated

=== Northern New South Wales ===
Pos	Team	Pld	W	D	L	GF	GA	GD	Pts	Qualification or relegation
1	Lambton Jaffas (C)	22	14	4	4	48	27	+21	46	2023 NPL Northern NSW Finals
2	Broadmeadow Magic	22	14	3	5	61	26	+35	45	2023 NPL Northern NSW Finals
3	Charlestown Azzurri	22	14	2	6	35	22	+13	44	2023 NPL Northern NSW Finals
4	Maitland FC	22	12	4	6	60	23	+37	40	2023 NPL Northern NSW Finals
5	Weston Workers	22	11	6	5	49	30	+19	39	2023 NPL Northern NSW Finals
6	Edgeworth FC	22	10	5	7	40	33	+7	35	
7	Newcastle Olympic	22	10	3	9	35	36	−1	33	
8	Cooks Hill United	22	9	5	8	41	34	+7	32	
9	Valentine Phoenix	22	7	4	11	32	43	−11	25	
10	Adamstown Rosebud	22	5	4	13	25	47	−22	19	
11	New Lambton	22	3	3	16	25	61	−36	12	
12	Lake Macquarie City	22	1	1	20	20	89	−69	4	

Source: squadi
Rules for classification: 1) points; 2) goal difference; 3) number of goals scored.
(C) Champions

==== Finals ====
Qualifying final
2	Broadmeadow Magic	4
3	Charlestown Azzurri	2
4	Maitland FC	0
5	Weston Bears	2

Major semi-final
1	Lambton Jaffas	4
2	Broadmeadow Magic	2
Minor semi-final
3	Charlestown Azzurri	1
5	Weston Bears	0

Preliminary final
2	Broadmeadow Magic	1
3	Charlestown Azzurri	0

Grand final
1	Lambton Jaffas	2
2	Broadmeadow Magic	1

=== Queensland ===
Pos	Team	Pld	W	D	L	GF	GA	GD	Pts	Qualification or relegation
1	Gold Coast Knights (C)	22	14	6	2	45	21	+24	48	2023 NPL Queensland Finals
2	Moreton Bay United	22	11	5	6	45	27	+18	38	2023 NPL Queensland Finals
3	Gold Coast United	22	10	6	6	27	23	+4	36	2023 NPL Queensland Finals
4	Brisbane City	22	10	5	7	46	30	+16	35	2023 NPL Queensland Finals
5	Lions FC	22	8	10	4	37	29	+8	34	2023 NPL Queensland Finals
6	Peninsula Power	22	9	7	6	34	30	+4	34	2023 NPL Queensland Finals
7	Rochedale Rovers	22	9	3	10	32	30	+2	30	
8	Sunshine Coast Wanderers	22	8	5	9	26	34	−8	29	
9	Brisbane Roar Youth	22	8	3	11	29	37	−8	27	
10	Redlands United	22	7	5	10	32	33	−1	26	
11	Olympic FC	22	5	4	13	28	39	−11	19	
12	Eastern Suburbs (R)	22	2	3	17	22	70	−48	9	Relegation to the 2024 Queensland Premier League 1

Source: squadi
Rules for classification: 1) points; 2) goal difference; 3) number of goals scored.
(C) Champions; (R) Relegated

==== Finals ====
Elimination final
3	Gold Coast United	1
6	Peninsula Power	3
4	Brisbane City	2
5	Lions FC	1

Semi-finals
1	Gold Coast Knights	5
6	Peninsula Power	0
2	Moreton Bay United	2
4	Brisbane City	1

Grand final
1	Gold Coast Knights	1
2	Moreton Bay United	0

=== South Australia ===
Pos	Team	Pld	W	D	L	GF	GA	GD	Pts	Qualification or relegation
1	North Eastern MetroStars	22	18	2	2	65	17	+48	56	Qualification for Finals
2	Campbelltown City	22	17	2	3	56	18	+38	53	Qualification for Finals
3	Adelaide United Youth (C)	22	10	4	8	40	36	+4	34	Qualification for Finals
4	Adelaide City	22	8	7	7	38	32	+6	31	Qualification for Finals
5	Modbury Jets	22	9	3	10	46	50	−4	30	Qualification for Finals
6	Adelaide Comets	22	7	8	7	30	33	−3	29	Qualification for Finals
7	Croydon FC	22	7	7	8	39	39	0	28	
8	FK Beograd	22	8	4	10	33	42	−9	28	
9	Adelaide Olympic	22	6	7	9	29	45	−16	25	
10	South Adelaide Panthers	22	4	7	11	35	53	−18	19	
11	Sturt Lions (R)	22	3	7	12	24	47	−23	16	Relegation to SA State League 1
12	West Adelaide (R)	22	3	6	13	20	43	−23	15	Relegation to SA State League 1

Source: dribl
Rules for classification: 1) points; 2) goal difference; 3) number of goals scored; 4) head to head record; 5) playoff match.
(C) Champions; (R) Relegated

==== Finals ====
Elimination Finals
4	Adelaide City	1
5	Modbury Jets	2
3	Adelaide United Youth (a.e.t.)	4
6	Adelaide Comets	3

Semi-finals
5	Modbury Jets	2	3	5
1	North Eastern MetroStars	3	0	3
3	Adelaide United Youth	2	3	5
2	Campbelltown City	1	1	2

Grand Final
5	Modbury Jets	2
3	Adelaide United Youth	7

=== Tasmania ===
Pos	Team	Pld	W	D	L	GF	GA	GD	Pts	Qualification
1	Devonport City (C)	21	18	1	2	68	17	+51	55	League champions and qualification for the finals series
2	South Hobart	21	12	4	5	61	30	+31	40	Qualification for the finals series
3	Glenorchy Knights	21	13	1	7	48	20	+28	40	Qualification for the finals series
4	Kingborough Lions United	21	13	0	8	70	40	+30	39	Qualification for the finals series
5	Clarence Zebras	21	9	2	10	52	53	−1	29	
6	Launceston City	21	8	3	10	26	34	−8	27	
7	Riverside Olympic	21	4	1	16	21	79	−58	13	
8	Launceston United	21	0	2	19	18	91	−73	2	

Source: Dribl
Rules for classification: 1) Points; 2) Goal difference; 3) Goals scored; 4) Head-to-head points; 5) Head-to-head goals scored; 6) Play-off match
(C) Champions

==== Finals ====
Semifinals
1	Devonport City	2
4	Kingborough Lions United	0
2	South Hobart	2
3	Glenorchy Knights	0

Grand final
1	Devonport City	0
2	South Hobart	2

=== Victoria ===
Pos	Team	Pld	W	D	L	GF	GA	GD	Pts	Qualification or relegation
1	Avondale FC (C)	26	21	4	1	78	23	+55	67	2023 NPL Victoria Finals
2	South Melbourne	26	20	2	4	56	23	+33	62	2023 NPL Victoria Finals
3	Oakleigh Cannons	26	18	4	4	64	25	+39	58	2023 NPL Victoria Finals
4	Melbourne Knights	26	14	5	7	51	35	+16	47	2023 NPL Victoria Finals
5	Port Melbourne	26	13	6	7	53	34	+19	45	2023 NPL Victoria Finals
6	Altona Magic	26	13	2	11	48	53	−5	41	2023 NPL Victoria Finals
7	Green Gully	26	13	1	12	53	40	+13	40	
8	Dandenong Thunder	26	10	3	13	49	48	+1	33	
9	Heidelberg United	26	8	7	11	31	46	−15	31	
10	Hume City	26	7	7	12	37	41	−4	28	
11	St Albans Saints	26	6	4	16	24	53	−29	22	
12	Moreland City	26	4	4	18	26	69	−43	16	
13	Bentleigh Greens (R)	26	4	3	19	24	51	−27	15	Relegation to the 2024 NPL Victoria 2
14	North Geelong Warriors (R)	26	4	2	20	18	71	−53	14	Relegation to the 2024 NPL Victoria 2

Source: mygameday
Rules for classification: 1) points; 2) goal difference; 3) number of goals scored.
(C) Champions; (R) Relegated

==== Finals ====
Elimination finals
4	Melbourne Knights	2
5	Port Melbourne	0
3	Oakleigh Cannons	5
6	Altona Magic	0

Preliminary finals
1	Avondale FC	1
4	Melbourne Knights	0
2	South Melbourne	2
3	Oakleigh Cannons	1

Grand final
1	Avondale FC	4
2	South Melbourne	0

=== Western Australia ===
Pos	Team	Pld	W	D	L	GF	GA	GD	Pts	Qualification or relegation
1	Perth RedStar	22	12	5	5	54	26	+28	41	2023 NPL WA Finals
2	Stirling Macedonia (C)	22	11	5	6	37	29	+8	38	2023 NPL WA Finals
3	Olympic Kingsway	22	10	4	8	35	32	+3	34	2023 NPL WA Finals
4	Perth SC	22	10	3	9	42	40	+2	33	2023 NPL WA Finals
5	Armadale SC	22	10	2	10	52	49	+3	32	
6	Bayswater City	22	8	6	8	45	50	−5	30	
7	Balcatta FC	22	8	5	9	35	37	−2	29	
8	Perth Glory Youth	22	8	4	10	51	55	−4	28	
9	Inglewood United	22	7	6	9	38	39	−1	27	
10	Floreat Athena	22	8	3	11	29	34	−5	27	
11	Sorrento FC (R)	22	8	3	11	39	48	−9	27	2023 promotion/relegation play-offs
12	Cockburn City (R)	22	6	6	10	27	45	−18	24	Relegation to the 2024 WA State League 1

Source: squadi
Rules for classification: 1) points; 2) goal difference; 3) number of goals scored.
(C) Champions; (R) Relegated

==== Finals ====
Semi-finals
1	Perth RedStar	1
2	Stirling Macedonia	0
3	Olympic Kingsway	0
4	Perth SC	3

Preliminary Final
Stirling Macedonia	2 (4)
Perth SC	2 (3)

Grand Final
Perth RedStar	0
Stirling Macedonia	2
