= 2025 National Premier Leagues Northern NSW =

National Premier Leagues Northern NSW
- Season: 2025
- Dates: 13 February – 10 August
- Champions: Broadmeadow Magic
- Premiers: Broadmeadow Magic
- Relegated: New Lambton
- Matches: 50
- Goals: 211 (4.22 per match)
- Top goalscorer: Braedyn Crowley (Maitland FC); 22 goals

The 2025 National Premier Leagues Northern NSW was the 34th season of the National Premier Leagues Northern NSW (13th season since the rename of the competition), a regional Australian soccer competition, based in Northern New South Wales. The season was held from February to August 2025, followed by a finals series.

Broadmeadow Magic were the defending premiers and champions, and they successfully defended both titles.

== Teams ==
=== Pre-season changes ===
2024 League	Promoted to league	Relegated from league
NPL NNSW	Belmont Swansea	Lake Macquarie City

=== Stadiums and locations ===
Team	Head coach		Location	Stadium	Capacity
Adamstown Rosebud	Chris Moylan	Newcastle	Adamstown	Adamstown Oval	2,000
Belmont Swansea	Michael Stafford	Lake Macquarie	Blacksmiths	Blacksmiths Oval	1,000
Broadmeadow Magic	Jim Cresnar	Newcastle	Broadmeadow	Magic Park	3,500
Charlestown Azzurri	James Pascoe	Lake Macquarie	Whitebridge	Lisle Carr Oval	2,000
Cooks Hill United	Chris Zoricich	Newcastle	Newcastle West	Fearnley Dawes Athletic Centre / No 2 Sportsground	750 / 5000
Edgeworth Eagles	Peter McGuinness	Lake Macquarie	Edgeworth	Jack McLaughlan Oval	5,000
Lambton Jaffas	David Tanchevski	Newcastle	Lambton	Arthur Edden Oval	2,000
Maitland Magpies	Adam Hughes	Maitland	East Maitland	Cooks Square Park	1,000
New Lambton	Shane Pryce	Newcastle	New Lambton	Alder Park	1,000
Newcastle Olympic	Paul Devitis	Newcastle	Hamilton	Darling Street Oval	1,000
Valentine Phoenix	Kallum Garbett	Lake Macquarie	Valentine	Croudace Bay Complex	
Weston Bears	Kew Jaliens	Cessnock	Weston	Rockwell Automation Park	1,000

== Regular season ==
=== League table ===
Pos	Team	Pld	W	D	L	GF	GA	GD	Pts	Qualification or relegation
1	Broadmeadow Magic (C, Q)	22	19	2	1	50	18	+32	59	Qualification to Australian Championship and Finals series
2	Edgeworth FC	22	17	2	3	50	15	+35	53	Qualification to Finals series
3	Weston Bears	22	16	2	4	61	25	+36	50	Qualification to Finals series
4	Lambton Jaffas	22	9	6	7	37	29	+8	33	Qualification to Finals series
5	Maitland FC	22	9	5	8	42	41	+1	32	Qualification to Finals series
6	Newcastle Olympic	22	8	7	7	46	38	+8	31	
7	Charlestown Azzurri	22	6	6	10	32	34	−2	24	
8	Adamstown Rosebud	22	7	2	13	33	47	−14	23	
9	Cooks Hill United	22	7	2	13	26	47	−21	23	
10	Belmont Swansea	22	4	8	10	34	45	−11	20	
11	Valentine FC (O)	22	4	4	14	28	60	−32	16	Qualification for the Relegation play-off
12	New Lambton (R)	22	1	4	17	21	61	−40	7	Relegation to 2026 NNSW Northern League 1

Source: Squadi
(C) Champions; (O) Play-off winners; (Q) Qualified for the phase indicated; (R) Relegated

=== Results ===
Home \ Away	ADA	BEL	BRO	CHA	COO	EDG	LAM	MAI	NLA	NOL	VAL	WES
Adamstown Rosebud	—	0–2	0–2	2–2	2–0	0–4	0–1	3–4	2–1	0–0	3–2	0–4
Belmont Swansea	5–2	—	1–2	1–2	1–3	1–1	0–3	1–3	0–0	2–3	2–1	0–3
Broadmeadow Magic	3–2	2–0	—	3–2	4–2	1–0	5–0	2–1	4–0	2–1	2–1	2–1
Charlestown Azzurri	0–4	2–2	1–1	—	1–2	1–2	1–1	1–2	3–0	3–2	0–0	3–1
Cooks Hill United	1–0	1–4	0–2	1–0	—	1–2		2–1	1–0	1–4	0–4	0–0
Edgeworth	2–1	4–1	1–0	1–0	2–0	—	0–0	2–0	3–0	3–0	2–0	1–2
Lambton Jaffas	0–1	1–1	1–2	1–1	3–2	0–2	—	4–2	2–0	0–0	7–0	1–4
Maitland	3–1		0–0	3–1	3–0	0–4	1–0	—	1–1	3–5	3–3	
New Lambton	0–3	2–2	3–5	2–1	2–4	2–4	1–3	0–1	—		2–3	1–5
Newcastle Olympic	4–0	2–2	0–1	0–1	4–2	2–3	3–1	1–1	2–2	—	2–2	2–2
Valentine	2–4	2–2	0–2	1–5	1–0	1–7	0–3	1–6	2–1	1–3	—	0–2
Weston Bears	5–3	4–2	1–3	2–1	4–0	2–0	0–2	5–1	5–0	5–1	2–1	—

Updated to match(es) played on 11 August 2025. Source: Squadi
Legend: Blue = home team win; Yellow = draw; Red = away team win.

== Finals series ==
=== Bracket ===
Qualifying final
2	Edgeworth FC	1
3	Weston Bears	2
4	Lambton Jaffas	3
5	Maitland FC	1

Major semi-final
1	Broadmeadow Magic	2
3	Weston Bears	0
Minor semi-final
2	Edgeworth FC	1
4	Lambton Jaffas	3

Preliminary final
Weston Bears	0
Lambton Jaffas	2

Grand final
Broadmeadow Magic	2
Lambton Jaffas	0

=== Relegation/Promotion Playoff ===
Semi-finals
NPL 11	Valentine FC	0	2	2
SL1 4	Singleton Strikers	0	0	0
SL1 2	Toronto Awaba Stags	2	0	2
SL1 3	West Wallsend	4	0	4

Final
Valentine FC	4
West Wallsend	0

== Statistics ==
=== Top Scorers ===
Correct as of 10 August 2025

Rank	Player	Team	Goals
1	Braedyn Crowley	Maitland	19
2	Ryan Feutz	Edgeworth	18
3	Christopher Hatfield	Weston Bears	14
4	Kale Bradbery	Newcastle Olympic	11
5	Cooper Buswell	Weston Bears	10
5	Denis Fajkovic	Adamstown Rosebud	10
7	Flynn Goodman	Edgeworth	9
8	James Cresnar	Broadmeadow Magic	8
8	Brock Beveridge	Weston Bears	8
8	James Oates	Lambton Jaffas	8
