= 2024 National Premier Leagues Northern NSW =

National Premier Leagues Northern NSW
- Season: 2024
- Dates: 24 February – 14 September 2024
- Champions: Broadmeadow Magic
- Premiers: Broadmeadow Magic
- Relegated: Lake Macquarie City
- Matches: 138
- Goals: 501 (3.63 per match)
- Top goalscorer: Ryan Feutz (27 goals)
- Biggest home win: Edgeworth 7–0 Adamstown Rosebud (29 May); Lambton Jaffas 7–0 Adamstown Rosebud (11 May)
- Biggest away win: Lambton Jaffas 0–6 Broadmeadow Magic (6 July); New Lambton 1–7 Newcastle Olympic (6 August)
- Highest scoring: Broadmeadow Magic 9–2 Valentine (14 August)

The 2024 National Premier Leagues Northern NSW was the 33rd season of the National Premier Leagues Northern NSW (12th season since the rename of the competition), a regional Australian soccer competition, based in Northern New South Wales. The season began on 24 February, and concluded on 21 September 2024.

== Teams ==
=== Stadiums and locations ===
Team	Location	Stadium	Capacity
Adamstown Rosebud	Newcastle (Adamstown)	Adamstown Oval	2,000
Broadmeadow Magic	Newcastle (Broadmeadow)	Magic Park	3,500
Charlestown Azzurri	Lake Macquarie (Kahibah)	Lisle Carr Oval	2,000
Cooks Hill United	Newcastle (Newcastle West)	Newcastle Athletics Field	
Edgeworth	Newcastle (Edgeworth)	Jack McLaughlan Oval	5,000
Lake Macquarie City	Lake Macquarie (Boolaroo)	Macquarie Field	5,000
Lambton Jaffas	Newcastle (Waratah)	Arthur Edden Oval	2,000
Maitland	Maitland	Cooks Square Park	1,000
New Lambton	Newcastle (New Lambton)	Alder Park	1,000
Newcastle Olympic	Newcastle (Hamilton)	Darling Street Oval	1,000
Valentine	Lake Macquarie (Boolaroo)	Croudace Bay Complex	
Weston Workers	Weston	Rockwell Automation Park	1,000

== Regular season ==
=== League table ===
Pos	Team	Pld	W	D	L	GF	GA	GD	Pts	Qualification or relegation
1	Broadmeadow Magic (C)	22	18	1	3	76	27	+49	55	Qualification to Finals series
2	Lambton Jaffas	22	17	1	4	51	20	+31	52	Qualification to Finals series
3	Edgeworth FC	22	14	3	5	47	23	+24	45	Qualification to Finals series
4	Charlestown Azzurri	22	13	3	6	35	20	+15	42	Qualification to Finals series
5	Newcastle Olympic	22	12	3	7	37	26	+11	39	Qualification to Finals series
6	Weston Workers	22	11	1	10	42	27	+15	34	
7	Cooks Hill United	22	9	4	9	50	38	+12	31	
8	Valentine FC	22	9	3	10	35	36	−1	30	
9	Maitland FC	22	7	4	11	40	48	−8	25	
10	New Lambton	22	4	3	15	19	47	−28	15	
11	Adamstown Rosebud	22	2	3	17	17	77	−60	9	
12	Lake Macquarie City (R)	22	1	1	20	16	76	−60	4	Relegation to 2025 NNSW Northern League 1

Source: Squadi
Rules for classification: 1) Points; 2) Goal difference; 3) Goals scored; 4) Head-to-head points; 5) Head-to-head points; 6) Head-to-head goal difference; 7) Least red cards; 8) Least yellow cards; 9) Toss of a coin
(C) Champions; (R) Relegated

=== Results ===
Home \ Away	ADA	BRO	CHA	COO	EDG	LMC	LAM	MAI	NLA	NOL	VAL	WES
Adamstown Rosebud	—	2–8	0–3	1–3	0–4	1–1	0–1	2–7	2–2	0–2	0–3	0–3
Broadmeadow Magic	3–2	—	0–0	5–2	3–1	3–1	2–3	2–0	5–1	3–0	9–2	5–0
Charlestown Azzurri	4–0	2–0	—	1–4	2–2	1–2	4–1	1–0	2–1	1–2	3–0	1–3
Cooks Hill United	6–0	3–4	0–2	—	0–2	4–1	2–3	5–0	1–2	1–2	1–1	0–2
Edgeworth	7–0	1–0	0–2	1–3	—	4–0	0–2	2–4	3–0	4–0	3–0	0–0
Lake Macquarie City	1–3	1–4	0–4	2–7	1–4	—	0–3	2–4	0–1	1–4	0–2	0–5
Lambton Jaffas	7–0	0–6	2–1	4–1	1–2	4–0	—	2–1	1–0	1–0	3–2	2–1
Maitland	1–1	1–4	2–2	2–2	4–5	2–0	0–5	—	1–1	1–2	0–1	0–1
New Lambton	2–1	2–5	0–1	0–1	0–1	1–2	1–1	1–2	—	1–7	0–3	2–1
Newcastle Olympic	1–2	1–2	3–1	1–1	1–1	3–1	2–1	0–3	2–1	—	0–0	1–2
Valentine	3–0	2–4	1–2	1–1	0–2	5–0	3–1	2–4	2–0	0–2	—	2–0
Weston Workers	6–0	2–3	0–2	1–2	0–2	6–1	1–2	3–1	3–0	0–1	1–0	—

Source: Squadi
Legend: Blue = home team win; Yellow = draw; Red = away team win.

== Finals series ==
=== Bracket ===
Qualifying final
2	Lambton Jaffas	0
3	Edgeworth FC	2
4	Charlestown Azzurri	2
5	Newcastle Olympic	0

Major semi-final
1	Broadmeadow Magic	2
2	Edgeworth FC	0
Minor semi-final
3	Lambton Jaffas	0
5	Charlestown Azzurri	4

Preliminary final
2	Edgeworth FC	3
3	Charlestown Azzurri	1

Grand final
1	Broadmeadow Magic (p)	2 (4)
2	Edgeworth FC	2 (3)

=== Qualifying final ===
24 August 2024
14:00

Lambton Jaffas	0–2	Edgeworth
	Report	Feutz 31', 59'

Arthur Edden Oval, Newcastle

=== Elimination final ===
24 August 2024
17:00

Charlestown Azzurri	2–0	Newcastle Olympic
Cousins 45', 46'	Report

Lisle Carr Oval, Newcastle

=== Semi-finals ===
Major semi-final

1 September 2024
14:30

Broadmeadow Magic	2–0	Edgeworth
Wells 3'; Stewardson 85'	Report

Magic Park, Newcastle

Minor semi-final

31 August 2024
14:30

Lambton Jaffas	0–4	Charlestown Azzurri
	Report	Sutherland 44'; Gallagher 56'; Frendo 66'; Munns 86'

Arthur Edden Oval, Newcastle

=== Preliminary final ===
8 September 2024
14:30

Edgeworth	3–1	Charlestown Azzurri
Woweries 45'; Clark 77'; Feutz 82'	Report	Sutherland 60'

Jack McLaughlan Oval, Newcastle

=== Grand final ===
14 September 2024
15:00

Broadmeadow Magic	2–2 (a.e.t.)	Edgeworth
Wells 85'; Cresnar 105'	Report	Oppedisano 56'; Van Haren 92'
Penalties
Stewardson (penalty scored); Benson (penalty scored); Kamper (penalty scored); Kacev (penalty missed); Beecham (penalty scored)	4–3	(penalty scored) Pawiak; (penalty missed) Jones; (penalty scored) King; (penalty scored) Fayers; (penalty missed) Feutz

Magic Park, Newcastle

== Season statistics ==
=== Top scorers ===
Rank	Player	Club	Goals
1	Ryan Feutz	Edgeworth	27
2	Bailey Wells	Broadmeadow Magic	20
3	Cody Nancarrow	Cooks Hill United	16
4	Kale Bradbery	Maitland	15
4	Braedyn Crowley	Maitland	15
6	Carter Smith	Cooks Hill United	14
7	Rene Ferguson	Charlestown Azzurri	13
8	Christopher Hatfield	Weston Workers	12
8	Jayden Stewardson	Broadmeadow Magic	12
9	Seth Clark	Edgeworth	11
10	Jarred Baker	Broadmeadow Magic	10

=== Discipline ===
==== Player ====
- Most yellow cards: 8
  - Connor Evans (Weston Workers)
  - Dane Lawther (Adamstown Rosebud)
  - Riley Mcnaughton (Lambton Jaffas)
- Most red cards: 2
  - Angelo Calfo (Weston Workers)
  - Jordan Lennon (Edgeworth)
