= Damien Smith =

Damien Smith may refer to:

- Damien Smith (artist) (born 1969), Canadian artist
- Damien Smith (football coach), Australian association football coach
- Damien Smith (journalist), Australian news reporter
- Damien Smith (Neighbours), fictional character on the Australian soap opera Neighbours
- Damien Smith (politician), New Zealand politician
- Damien Smith (rugby league) (born 1974), Australian former rugby league player

== See also ==
- Damian Smith (disambiguation)
