= Roy O'Donovan =

Irish footballer (born 1985)

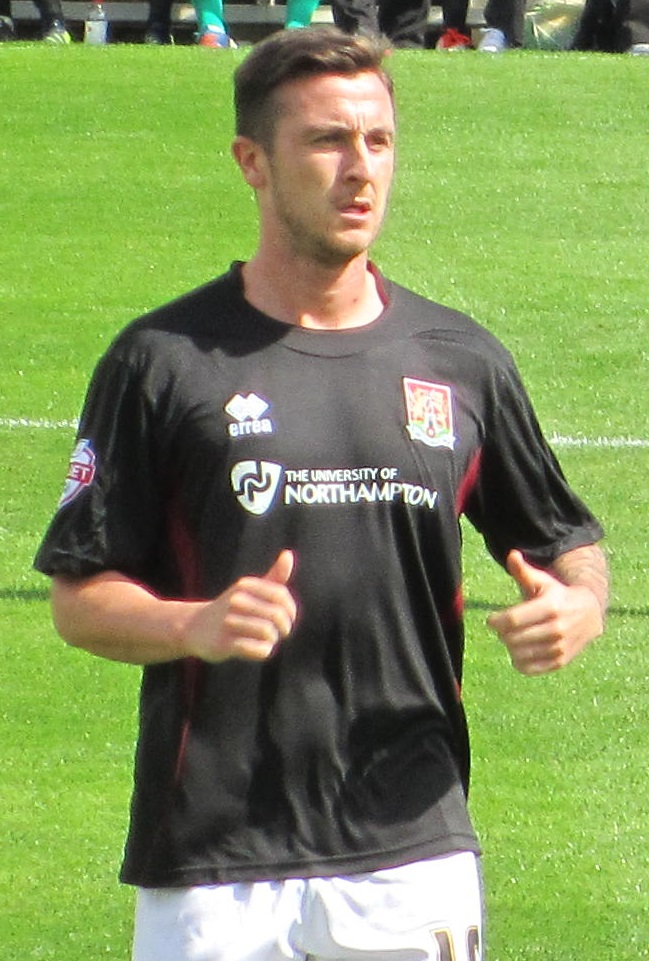
- O'Donovan playing for Northampton Town in 2013

Personal information
- Full name: Roy Simon O'Donovan
- Date of birth: 10 August 1985 (age 41)
- Place of birth: Cork, Ireland
- Height: 1.79 m (5 ft 10 in)
- Position: Striker

Youth career
- 2001–2004: Coventry City

Senior career*
Years	Team	Apps	(Gls)
2005–2007	Cork City	79	(34)
2007–2010	Sunderland	17	(0)
2008–2009	→ Dundee United (loan)	11	(1)
2009	→ Blackpool (loan)	12	(0)
2009	→ Southend United (loan)	4	(1)
2010	→ Hartlepool United (loan)	15	(9)
2010–2013	Coventry City	17	(0)
2012	→ Hibernian (loan)	14	(1)
2013–2014	Northampton Town	31	(6)
2014	DPMM FC	24	(15)
2015	Mitra Kukar	1	(0)
2015–2017	Central Coast Mariners	45	(19)
2017–2019	Newcastle Jets	33	(20)
2019–2020	Brisbane Roar	12	(6)
2020–2021	Newcastle Jets	36	(12)
2021–2024	Sydney Olympic	76	(57)
2025	Newcastle Olympic	6	(6)
Total		435	(187)

International career
2004–2006	Republic of Ireland U21	8	(1)
2006–2007	Republic of Ireland B	2	(0)

Managerial career
- 2023–2024: Sydney Olympic (assistant coach)
- * Club domestic league appearances and goals

Roy Simon O'Donovan (born 10 August 1985) is an Irish former footballer who played as a striker. He has been capped by Ireland at Under-19, Under-21 and B level. O'Donovan has previously played for Cork City, Sunderland, Dundee United, Blackpool, Southend United, Hartlepool United, Coventry City, Hibernian, Northampton Town, DPMM FC, Mitra Kukar FC, Central Coast Mariners, Brisbane Roar, Newcastle Jets and Sydney Olympic.

== Club career ==
O'Donovan played schoolboy football for Blarney Street United Cork. In 2001, he signed for English Premier League club Coventry City as a trainee, before being released in December 2004 at aged nineteen without making a first team appearance for the club.

=== Cork City ===
O'Donovan moved back to Republic of Ireland and joined his hometown club Cork City in early 2005. In his first season at Cork City they captured the League of Ireland championship after a twelve-year absence. He played mainly as a wide-right attacking midfielder after joining Cork, but was soon moved up front as a striker, becoming the top goalscorer in the League of Ireland. He scored in a UEFA Cup win in July 2005 versus Ekranas of Lithuania, City were eventually eliminated by Slavia Prague. The following season they competed in the Champions league qualifying phase but came up short against Red Star Belgrade (Crevena Zvezda). He was named the eircom/Soccer Writers Association of Ireland (SWAI) Player of the Month for November 2005 and won the award again in November 2006 after being switched to centre forward from midfield, he was also a nominee for the Soccer Writers Association of Ireland (SWAI) player of the year the same season.

On 21 November it was reported that Wolverhampton Wanderers were interested in signing O'Donovan, but that they were denied permission to speak to him about a move by Cork City. On 7 July 2007, he scored as Cork City drew 1–1 with Swedish Allsvenskan club Hammarby in the second round of the 2007 Intertoto Cup. He scored a total of 31 league goals in 74 league appearances for the club was top scorer in the 2007 Setanta Cup, as well as competing in the qualifying rounds of the Champions League in 2006 scoring 2 goals in European competitions in his time at CCFC.

=== Sunderland ===
In July 2007, Fulham agreed a fee with Cork City to sign O'Donovan, however, Roy Keane signed him for Sunderland on 7 August for a League of Ireland record transfer fee of €500,000, with O'Donovan saying, "I had a choice between Fulham and Sunderland but when I spoke to the gaffer [Roy Keane] my mind was made up." The fee can increase to €1 million depending on appearances for club and country. He signed a three-year contract, He made his Premier League debut for Sunderland as a 70th-minute substitute in the 2–2 draw with Birmingham City at St Andrew's on 15 August. His first start of the season came on 21 October in the 3–1 defeat to West Ham United at Upton Park, although he was substituted in the 46th minute. O'Donovan made seventeen appearances for the Black Cats in the 2007–08 season, starting just four Barclays Premier League games.

His first goal for Sunderland came in a pre-season against Portuguese Liga club Sporting Clube de Portugal on 20 July 2008.

==== Dundee United ====
On 8 August 2008, he signed a one-year loan deal with Dundee United, under then manager Craig Levein. He made his debut for the Tangerines on 11 August in a 3–1 defeat to Hamilton Academical at New Douglas Park. He scored his first goal in a 2–0 home win over St Mirren on 25 October, after coming on as a 67th-minute substitute: the goal was a poignant one, coming in front of a full stadium of supporters who had turned up to commemorate the passing of the popular club chairman Eddie Thompson. On 1 November, he was sent off in the 57th minute of the 0–0 draw against Falkirk at the Falkirk Stadium. In late December he was one of three players along with Michael Chopra and Anthony Stokes recalled by Sunderland who were struggling with injuries.

==== Blackpool ====
On 9 January 2009, he signed for Championship club Blackpool on loan until the end of the season. He made his debut for the Seasiders in the 2–1 defeat to Coventry City at the Ricoh Arena on 17 January. He played mainly as a right-sided midfielder. What had been a successful loan spell up to this point took a turn for the worse when on 10 March, he was taken to hospital after being taken ill with suspected appendicitis before Blackpool's game against Sheffield United at Bramall Lane. Two days later he had keyhole surgery to remove his appendix. He returned to action just a month later on 11 April in Blackpool's 1–0 West Lancashire Derby win over Preston North End at Deepdale. He retained his place in the side for the following game, a 2–2 draw against Reading.

==== Southend United ====
On 16 September 2009, O'Donovan joined Southend United on a one-month emergency loan deal. He scored on his debut against Brighton & Hove Albion, in the 3–2 win. O'Donovan made a further two league appearances plus one in the Football League Trophy before returning to Sunderland once the loan was completed.

==== Hartlepool United ====
On 23 February 2010, he joined Hartlepool United on loan until the end of the 2009–10 season. He made his debut for Hartlepool in their 4–1 home win over Carlisle United on 23 February 2010. On 6 March 2010, he scored his first goals for Hartlepool, a hat-trick against Southend, who he was with at the beginning of the season. O'Donovan went on to make 15 appearances scoring 9 goals before returning to parent club Sunderland at the end of the season.

=== Coventry City ===
O'Donovan signed a three–year deal with Coventry City on 25 June 2010 becoming new manager Aidy Boothroyd's third signing of the close season. He officially transferred to Coventry on 1 July 2010, five years after leaving them as an academy player. He scored his first goal for the Sky Blues against Bury FC in August 2011. O'Donovan suffered a fractured metatarsal in an nPower championship game against Barnsley in November 2011 which meant a significant period recovering on the sidelines. He signed on loan for Hibernian FC on his return to fitness on 31 January 2012 for the remainder of the season. O'Donovan returned to Coventry for the 2012–13 season and made some first team appearances under the new management of Mark Robins, but mutually agreed to terminate his contract on 31 January 2013.

==== Hibernian ====
O'Donovan was loaned to Hibernian in January 2012 for the rest of the 2011–12 season where he scored two goals against Kilmarnock FC and a goal in the Scottish cup quarter final against Ayr United en route to the Scottish Cup Final at Hamden Park that season, O'Donovans goal versus Kilmarnock FC was a memorable one and an SPL goal of the month nominee>

=== Northampton Town ===
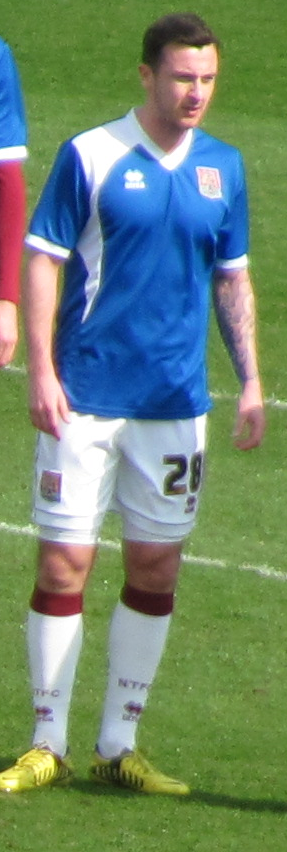
O'Donovan warming up for Northampton Town in 2013

O'Donovan signed for Northampton Town on a free transfer in January 2013. He was signed by Aidy Boothroyd, who had previously signed O'Donovan for Coventry. On 13 May 2013 he played in the 3–0 play-off final defeat to Bradford City FC at Wembley Stadium, he signed a new two-year contract in July 2013 at sixfields and started the season in goal scoring form but injuries curtailed his involvement in the first team after double hernia surgery in October led to a ten-week hiatus. In January 2014 following the dismissal of manager Aidy Boothroyd, O'Donovan flew to Dubai for talks with Brunei DPMM FC at the invitation of the Crown Prince of Brunei. A move he later turned down.

=== Brunei DPMM ===
After previously rejecting a contract after initial talks in January, O'Donovan signed a contract with Brunei DPMM FC in February 2014 as their marquee player in the Singapore S.League. He won his first pieces of silverware in Asia when picking up the Starhub S.League Cup in July 2014 and was also voted as the Most Valuable Player of the tournament. O'Donovan finished the season with 26 goals in total and as a firm fans favourite.

=== Mitra Kukar ===
In February 2015, he was signed by Mitra Kukar of the Indonesian Super League. Having enjoyed success in Asia the previous season scoring 26 goals in 35 games in the Singapore S.League in all competitions with Brunei DPMM. He was to spend only two months in Indonesia due to the newly formed Indonesian Super League (ISL) being scrapped by FIFA regarding ongoing issues with the football association of Indonesia.

=== Central Coast Mariners ===
On 30 May 2015, the Central Coast Mariners announced that they had signed O'Donovan to a 2-season contract. He made his competitive debut for the club in an FFA Cup match against Wellington Phoenix on 12 August 2015. He missed a penalty late in the same match. In his A-League debut against Perth Glory on 10 October 2015, O'Donovan opened the scoring in the game finding the net after a shot from Fábio Ferreira was rebounded to him by the glory keeper Ante Covic. The Mariners won the match 3–2.

On 31 December 2015, O'Donovan was involved in an incident in a match versus the Wellington Phoenix, where he deliberately head-butted Phoenix defender Manny Muscat in retaliation for an off the ball elbow he received from the defender, O'Donovan was sanctioned during the match for the act as the referee awarded the player a yellow card. However, he was later handed an eight-match ban by the Football Federation Australia disciplinary committee for his conduct, one of the longest bans in A-League history. Manny Muscat also received a multiple game suspension for his elbow that triggered the incident. O'Donovan finished his first season in Australia as the club's golden boot winner as well as the winner of the Hyundai A League 'Goal of the Season'

=== Newcastle Jets ===
On 19 April 2017, O'Donovan signed a two-year contract with another A-League team, the Newcastle Jets. He reportedly turned down offers from Adelaide United, Brisbane Roar, Western Sydney Wanderers and Central Coast Mariners. In the 2018 A-League Grand Final he was sent off with a straight red card after a high boot to the head of the opposing team's goal keeper while trying to score a goal in the final minute of the 2018 A-League Grand Final. He was subsequently suspended for 10 games

=== Brisbane Roar ===
On 24 June 2019, O'Donovan signed a two-year deal with Brisbane Roar after choosing not to re-sign with Newcastle Jets. He scored his first goal for the club in his debut on 13 October 2019, snatching a late draw against Perth Glory in the season opener. On 17 November 2019, O'Donovan secured his first hat-trick for Roar in a 4–3 home win against Melbourne City.

=== Newcastle Jets ===
On 2 February 2020, O'Donovan signed an 18-month contract with the Jets. In 2020, O'Donovan became an Australian citizen and counts as a local player under A-League regulations.

=== Sydney Olympic ===
On 21 October 2021, O'Donovan signed with Sydney Olympic for 2022 National Premier Leagues NSW Seasons. He made his league debut on 5 March 2022, in a 1–0 loss against Manly United wearing the number 99. A week later, he scored his first goal for the club against Rockdale Ilinden. O'Donovan prolific form continued throughout the season, helping his side win the NPL Premiership and winning the golden boot. He was also named in the NPL NSW Men's Team of the Year with teammate Darcy Burgess who was named as a substitute.

On 18 November 2022, O'Donovan renewed his contract and was additionally appointed as assistant coach with head coach Labinot Haliti prior to the 2023 season.

Having scored over 50 goals across 3 seasons for the National Premier Leagues team, O'Donovan announced his retirement at the conclusion of the 2024 National Premier Leagues NSW season.

=== Newcastle Olympic ===
Despite announcing his retirement a month before, O'Donovan signed for Newcastle Olympic of the National Premier Leagues Northern NSW for the upcoming 2025 season. He finally hung up his boots after six goals in as many games.

== International career ==
O'Donovan has played for the Republic of Ireland Under-19, Under-21 and B teams. He made his debut for the Under-21 team in August 2005 against Northern Ireland. On 18 May, he scored as the Irish Under-21s beat Azerbaijan 3–0 in a 2007 UEFA European Under-21 Football Championship qualification preliminary round match, He went on to make eight appearances for the under-21s, scoring once.

On 21 November 2007, he played for Republic of Ireland B as they drew 1–1 with Scotland B in a friendly international at the Excelsior Stadium, Airdrie.

In May 2007, O'Donovan expressed his surprise and disappointment at not being part of the Republic of Ireland squad for the end of season international matches against Ecuador and Bolivia, a squad in which his Cork City teammate Joe Gamble was included. O'Donovan said, "I'm surprised to be honest with you. I've scored 25 goals in the last 25 or 26 games so I can't do any more. I would have liked a reason why I'm not in it, but that's life."

== Career statistics ==
Club	Season	League			National Cup		League Cup		Other^{[A]}^{[B]}		Total	
Club	Season	Division	Apps	Goals	Apps	Goals	Apps	Goals	Apps	Goals	Apps	Goals
Cork City	2005–07	League of Ireland	79	34	5	2	0	0	16	8	100	44
Cork City	Total		79	34	5	2	0	0	0	0	100	44
Sunderland	2007–08	Premier League	17	0	1	0	1	0	0	0	19	0
Dundee United (loan)	2008–09	Scottish Premier League	11	1	0	0	2	0	0	0	13	1
Blackpool (loan)	2008–09	Championship	12	0	0	0	0	0	0	0	12	0
Southend United (loan)	2009–10	League One	4	1	0	0	0	0	1	0	5	1
Hartlepool United (loan)	2009–10	League One	15	9	0	0	0	0	0	0	15	9
Coventry City	2010–11	Championship	2	0	1	0	1	0	0	0	4	0
Coventry City	2011–12	Championship	11	0	1	0	1	1	0	0	13	1
Coventry City	2012–13	League One	4	0	2	0	1	0	0	0	7	0
Coventry City	Total		17	0	4	0	3	1	0	0	24	1
Hibernian (loan)	2011–12	Scottish Premier League	14	1	2	1	0	0	0	0	16	2
Northampton Town	2012–13	League Two	19	6	0	0	0	0	0	0	19	6
Northampton Town	2013–14	League Two	15	1	0	0	1	1	0	0	16	2
Northampton Town	Total		34	7	2	0	1	1	0	0	35	8
DPMM FC	2014	S.League	24	15	6	7	5	4	0	0	35	26
Mitra Kukar F.C.	2015	Indonesia Super League	1	0	0	0	0	0	0	0	1	0
Central Coast Mariners FC	2015–16	A-League	19	8	0	0	0	0	0	0	19	8
Central Coast Mariners FC	2016–17	A-League	26	11	0	0	0	0	0	0	26	11
Central Coast Mariners FC	Total		45	28	0	0	0	0	0	0	45	19
Newcastle Jets	2017–18	A-League	16	9	1	0	0	0	2	0	19	9
Newcastle Jets	2018–19	A-League	19	11	—		0	0	0	0	19	11
Newcastle Jets	2019–20	A-League	11	4	0	0	0	0	0	0	11	4
Newcastle Jets	2020–21	A-League	25	7	0	0	0	0	0	0	25	7
Newcastle Jets	Total		71	31	1	0	1	0	2	0	74	31
Brisbane Roar	2019–20	A-League	9	6	2	1	0	0	0	0	11	7
Sydney Olympic	2021	National Premier Leagues NSW	0	0	1	0	0	0	0	0	1	0
Sydney Olympic	2022	National Premier Leagues NSW	24	22	0	0	0	0	0	0	24	22
Sydney Olympic	2023	National Premier Leagues NSW	28	18	0	0	0	0	0	0	28	18
Sydney Olympic	2024	National Premier Leagues NSW	24	17	0	0	0	0	0	0	24	17
Sydney Olympic	Total		76	57	1	0	0	0	0	0	77	57
Newcastle Olympic	2025	National Premier Leagues Northern NSW	6	6	0	0	0	0	0	0	6	6
Career total			435	187	21	11	12	6	17	8	485	212

A. The "Other" column constitutes appearances and goals (including substitutes) in the Football League Trophy.
B. The "Other" column constitutes appearances and goals (including substitutes) in the A-League Finals Series.

== Honours ==
- Eircom League Premier League: 2005
- Starhub Singapore League Cup: 2014

=== Individual ===
- Starhub S-league League Cup Most Valuable Player 2014
- A-League Goal of the Year: 2015–16
- Professional Footballers Australia A-League Player of the Month for October 2017
- National Premier Leagues NSW Golden Boot 2022
- National Premier Leagues NSW Team of the Year 2022
