= Damien Smith (football coach) =

Australian football coach

Damien Smith is a former coach of Broadmeadow Magic FC, a semi-professional side based in Newcastle, New South Wales and currently playing in the National Premier Leagues Northern NSW. He coached at Broadmeadow across two tenures. The first ran from 2002 to 2007 in which he won the minor premiership in 2003 and 2005. In 2004 and 2005, Smith won the grand final with Magic across back to back seasons.

Smith left Broadmeadow at the end of 2007 and returned in 2010 to replace then coach Peter McGuinness. On his return Smith worked alongside Robert Virgili in a dual coaching role, until taking over the head coaching role by himself in 2011, with Virgili as assistant. His first season back in charge in 2010, didn't go as planned with Magic failing to make the finals, and finishing back in sixth in the then eight team competition.

A year later though, Smith would return to his winning ways with the club, as they took out the minor and major premiership in 2011. Smith announced in July 2012 that he would finish his second tenure at the club at the conclusion of the season. Broadmeadow would send Smith out victorious beating arch rivals Hamilton Olympic FC 4–1 in the grand final to claim the major premiership.

Smith won a record three Premierships and four Championships during his time at the club and is the most successful coach in their history. In his post-coaching days, he volunteered as a pundit on BarTV Sports' coverage of the National Premier Leagues Northern NSW alongside esteemed former local coach Chris Turner, and commentator Ben Homer.

Northern NSW State League Premierships (3) - 2003, 2005, 2011

Northern NSW State League Championships (4) - 2004, 2005, 2011, 2012
