= NNSWF State Cup =

NNSW Football State Cup
- Founded: 2010
- Region: Northern New South Wales
- Current champions: Maitland FC (2026)
- Most championships: Broadmeadow Magic (3)
- 2026 Australia Cup preliminary rounds

The Northern NSW Football State Cup is a knockout football competition held by NNSW Football, and is open to all male teams. In 2014, the competition also acted as the preliminary rounds of the Australia Cup.

From 2015 to 2022, the final two sides from the preliminary rounds progressed to the FFA Cup Round of 32 without playing a subsequent cup final, and therefore no champion was crowned. The cup final was re-introduced in 2023.

Prior to 1959, northern NSW teams participated in the State Cup for the whole state of NSW, with both Wallsend and West Wallsend winning on multiple occasions.

== Finals ==
Season	Champion	Score	Runner-up	Venue	Reference
2010	Valentine Phoenix	1–1 (6–5(p))	Weston Bears	Thomas & Coffey Park	
2011	South Cardiff	1–1 (5–4(p))	Edgeworth FC	Ulinga Oval	
2012	Broadmeadow Magic	4–0	Coffs City United	Coffs Harbour International Stadium	
2013	Urunga Raiders	1–1 (9–8(p))	Edgeworth FC	Coffs Harbour International Stadium	
2014	Broadmeadow Magic	1–1 (6–5(p))	South Cardiff	Magic Park	
2015–2022	not held				
2023	Broadmeadow Magic	2–0	Edgeworth FC	Rockwell Automation Park	
2024	Lambton Jaffas	1–1 (4–3(p))	Edgeworth FC	Lake Macquarie Regional Football Facility	
2025	Cooks Hill United	0–0 (4–3(p))	Weston Bears	Lake Macquarie Regional Football Facility	
2026	Maitland FC	1–0	Weston Bears	Lake Macquarie Regional Football Facility	

== Trophy ==
The NNSW Football State Cup

The NNSW Football State Cup is shown here at the Broadmeadow Magic 2014 winning celebration.
