= Damian Smith =

Damian Smith may refer to:

- Damian Smith (dancer), former ballet dancer
- Damian Smith (General Hospital), a character from the television series General Hospital
- Damian Smith (rugby union) (born 1969), Australian rugby union player

== See also ==
- Damien Smith (disambiguation)
