= Damien Smith (journalist) =

Damien Smith is a former reporter for Seven News in Sydney, New South Wales, Australia.

Smith is the law reporter, and among the longest serving legal affairs journalists. Smith joined Sydney's Seven News in 1997. While working for Seven News, he has reported on many cases, including the trials of Rene Rivkin, Kathleen Folbigg and Edward Lee. While reporting, Smith attends many Police Corruption inquiries.

During Seven's coverage of the 11 September terrorist attacks, he reported from Washington, D.C. and New York City. Smith has previously worked for WIN Television and Ten News.
