= Damien Smith (artist) =

Damien Smith (born 1968) is a Canadian artist.

== Life ==
Born in Ottawa, Ontario, Canada, Smith holds a BA (Hons) from the University of Guelph.

== Work ==
Smith is known for his drawings of the architectural and social legacy of modernist design and its failed utopian agenda.

== Exhibitions ==
Solo and group exhibitions:

- Brooklyn Museum of Art (2007),
- Gasworks Gallery, London UK (2007),
- Cornerhouse, Manchester UK (2007),*

Paul Morris Gallery, New York (1998, 2001),

- Works On Paper Inc., Los Angeles (2000 & 2002),
- Experiments, SFMOMA, San Francisco (2001),
- Art On Paper, Weatherspoon Art Museum, Greensboro, North Carolina (2002),
- Rena Bransten Gallery, San Francisco (2004),
- Lucas Schoormans Galley, New York (2005),
- Walker Art Center, Minneapolis (2007),
- BravinLee Programs, New York (2009).

== Collections ==
Smith's work is held in the public collections of:

- the Walker Art Center
- the San Francisco Museum of Modern Art
- the Museum of Fine Arts, Houston
- the Canada Council

Private collections: USA, United Kingdom, Canada, Denmark, the Netherlands.
