= Belmont Swansea United FC =

- Full name: Belmont Swansea United Football Club
- Nickname: Belswans
- Founded: 1935
- Ground: Blacksmiths Oval, Blacksmiths
- Coordinates: 33°04′50.4″S 151°39′7.6″E
- Head Coach: Mick Stafford
- League: NPL NNSW
- 2026: 5th of 12
- Website: http://www.foxsportspulse.com/club_info.cgi?c=0-8304-113395-0-0
Home colours	Away colours

Belmont Swansea United Football Club is an Australian soccer club based in the East Lakes region of Lake Macquarie, New South Wales, more commonly known as Belswans, they currently compete in the Northern NSW Football National Premier Leagues competition; the highest division of the NNSW Football Leagues and the second tier of soccer in Australia.

The badge for Belswans has a stylised black swan, with a Curved gold wave inspired by the local coastal topography. The club colours are Green and Gold.

Belmont Swansea United’s home ground is Blacksmiths Oval, Blacksmiths since 1935.

== History ==
The club was established in 1935 under the name Blacksmiths Rangers Soccer Club. In 1956, following promotion from the Hunter Valley competition to the Northern New South Wales Second Division, the organisation adopted the name Belmont Swansea United Soccer Club. The change was made to provide a representative football club for the East Lakes area of Lake Macquarie at a higher competitive level.

Belmont Swansea United gained promotion to the First Division in 1967. The club subsequently won First Division grand final championships in 1970, 1977, and 1978. Between 1979 and 1992, it competed in the Northern New South Wales State First Division.

In 1985, the club won the State First Division minor premiership and followed this achievement by claiming the State First Division Grand Final title in 1986.

Following a restructuring of the Northern New South Wales football competition system in 1992, Belmont Swansea United was placed in the State Second Division despite finishing sixth in the State First Division that season. The club finished as runners-up in the State Second Division in 1993 but did not secure promotion back to the top division.

From 1999 to 2024, Belmont Swansea United competed in the second tier of Northern New South Wales football. During this period, the club has made numerous finals and semi-final appearances.

In 2015, the club celebrated the 80th anniversary of organised football. To align with contemporary Football Federation Australia naming conventions, the club formally adopted its current name, Belmont Swansea United Football Club.

In 2024 Belswans were promoted to the Northern NSW Football National Premier Leagues.

== First Grade Squad ==
Note: Flags indicate national team as defined under FIFA eligibility rules; some limited exceptions apply. Players may hold more than one non-FIFA nationality.

No.	Pos.	Nation	Player
1	GK	AUS	Nathan Archbold
2	DF	AUS	Ian Matthews
3	DF	AUS	Quinton Phillips-Tapsell
4	DF	AUS	Adam Blunden
5	FW	AUS	Joe Kable
6	MF	AUS	Chris Fayers
7	MF	USA	Andrew McGee
8	MF	AUS	Reece Newton (C)
10	FW	AUS	Dean Pettit
11	FW	AUS	Ethan Hall

No.	Pos.	Nation	Player
12	FW	AUS	Markus Wolscher
13	MF	AUS	Barney Irvine-Rundle
15	DF	JPN	Sho Goto
17	DF	AUS	Blair Fitzpatrick
19	FW	AUS	Jed Hornery
40	GK	AUS	Tyler Bartley

*Accurate as of September 17 2026

== Top Goal-scorers Per Season ==
Year	Player	Goals
2013	Luke Shearer	14
2014	Luke Shearer	8
2015	Jamie Hadlow	8
2016	Jamie Hadlow	9
2017	Tega Adjeke	20
2018	Joel Shearer; Klaudon Ahmataj	5
2019	Ty Goldsmith	10
2020	Joel Nicholson	6
2021	Kane Woolston	17
2022	Kane Woolston	17
2023	Reece Newton	6
2024	Kane Woolston	26
2025	Kane Woolston	8

== Coaching staff ==
Position	Staff
Head coach	Mick Stafford
Goalkeeping coach	Michael Peachey
Assistant coach	Logan Williams
Reserve Grade Coach/Assistant Coach	Andrew Ollier

== Honours ==
=== 1st Grade ===
Premiers:

NNSW Northern Second Division - 1966, 1978

Northern First Division - 1985

Northern NSW State League Division 1 - 2024

Champions:

NNSW Northern Second Division - 1977 & 1978

Northern First Division - 1970

Northern NSW State League Division 1 - 2018 & 2019, 2022

=== Reserve Grade/U23s ===
Minor Premierships:

Grand Finals:

=== U18s/U19s ===
Minor Premierships:

Grand Finals: 2002 2016 Northern NSW State League Division 1

=== Youth ===
Minor Premierships: 2020 Northern NSW State League Division 1 (U14s)

Grand Finals: 2020 Northern NSW State League Division 1 (U15s)
