= Edgeworth FC =

Edgeworth Eagles
- Full name: Edgeworth Eagles Football Club
- Nickname: Eagles
- Ground: Jack McLaughlan Oval
- Capacity: 1,000
- Coordinates: 32.925949°S 151.621463°E
- Head coach: Peter McGuinness
- League: NPL NNSW
- 2026: 4th of 12
- Website: edgewortheaglesfc.com.au

Edgeworth Eagles Football Club is an Australian semi-professional football club based in the suburb of Edgeworth, near Newcastle, New South Wales. The club currently competes in the National Premier Leagues Northern NSW.

== History ==
The suburb of Edgeworth was known as Young Wallsend until 1960. The first recorded football match involving a Young Wallsend team took place on 14 May 1892, when Minmi Rangers defeated Young Wallsend 3–0 at the Young Wallsend ground.

For most of the 20th century a lower-league club, Edgeworth won promotion into the Northern New South Wales 1st Division in 1973. Edgeworth made the 1st Division grand final in 1977, only to be defeated 1-0 by Weston. This loss was avenged in 1978, when Edgeworth emerged as unbeaten minor premiers and defeated Weston 2–0 in the grand final.

They have previous played in the early national cup competition on this occasion, in the 1981 NSL Cup, losing 1–2 to NSL side Sydney Olympic.

Edgeworth's most successful period was 2015-2020 where they were Premiers 5 times (2015, 2016, 2017, 2018, and 2020) and Champions four times (2015, 2016, 2019, and 2020). Prior to this their most successful run was when they finished first on the Northern New South Wales State League ladder from 1998 to 2000.

On 21 June 2015, Edgeworth qualified for the 2015 FFA Cup round of 32 after defeating Adamstown Rosebud 3–0 in the final qualifying round. A goal in injury time to Melbourne City eliminated Edgeworth 2–1 in the round of 32.

Edgeworth were premiers of the 2015 National Premier League Northern NSW winning the league by three points. They were also champions after winning the grand final 2–0 over Hamilton Olympic.

Winning the premiership qualified Edgeworth for the 2015 National Premier League Finals. Edgeworth was drawn away to Moreton Bay United in the quarter-final, however, lost the game 3–1.

== Current squad ==
Note: Flags indicate national team as defined under FIFA eligibility rules; some limited exceptions apply. Players may hold more than one non-FIFA nationality.

No.	Pos.	Nation	Player
3	MF	AUS	Sam Jones
4	DF	AUS	Patrick Wheeler
5	MF	AUS	Jordan Lennon
6	MF	AUS	Nicholas Curran
7	MF	AUS	Jarryd Sutherland
8	MF	AUS	Andrew Pawiak
9	FW	AUS	Sascha Montefiore
10	MF	AUS	Dylan Holz
11	MF	AUS	Tom Curran
12	DF	AUS	Joshua Gorman
13	MF	AUS	Mason King
14	FW	AUS	Joseph Melmeth
18	FW	AUS	Callum Stalling
19	DF	AUS	Tyson Jackson

No.	Pos.	Nation	Player
21	GK	AUS	Ben Conway
—	DF	AUS	Matthew Burton
—	DF	AUS	Sam Maxwell
—	MF	AUS	Jay Kitcher
—	MF	AUS	Archie Finn
—	GK	AUS	Nate Cavaliere
—	FW	AUS	Bailey Rae
—	MF	AUS	Jackson Pereira
—	DF	AUS	Tao Grieves
—	FW	AUS	Jordan Bower
—	FW	AUS	Jayden Stewardson
—	FW	AUS	Aaron Niyonkuru
—	FW	AUS	Reece McManus

== Honours ==
- NNSW 1st Division/NBN State League/NPL Northern NSW Premiership:
  - Winners (13): 1978, 1979, 1998, 1999, 2000, 2002, 2006, 2009, 2015-2018, 2020
- NNSW 1st Division/NBN State league/NPL Northern NSW Championship:
  - Winners (7): 1978, 2003, 2010, 2015, 2016, 2019, 2020
  - Runners-up (5): 2000, 2006, 2007, 2017, 2018
- NNSW Football State Cup:
  - Runners-up (4): 2011, 2013, 2023, 2024
- NNSW 2nd Division/NNSW State league 1 Premiership:
  - Winners (2): 1973, 1989
- NNSW 2nd Division/NNSW State league 1 Championship:
  - Winners (1): 1989
