= National Premier Leagues Northern NSW Men's =

Soccer competition in northern New South Wales

- Founded: 2014; 1998–2013 (as Northern NSW State League); 1959–1997 (as Northern First Division)
- Country: Australia
- State: (New South Wales) NSW
- Confederation: AFC
- Number of clubs: 12
- Level on pyramid: 2
- Relegation to: Northern League One
- Domestic cup(s): National; Australia Cup; State; Northern NSW Football State Cup
- Current champions: Weston Bears (2026)
- Current premiers: Broadmeadow Magic (2026)
- Broadcaster(s): YouTube
- Website: Northern NSW Football NPL
- Current: 2026 NPL Northern NSW

The National Premier Leagues Northern NSW (NPL NNSW) is a semi-professional soccer competition in Northern New South Wales. The competition is conducted by Northern NSW Football, one of two organizing bodies in New South Wales (the other being the National Premier Leagues NSW organized by Football NSW). The league is a subdivision of the second tier National Premier Leagues Men's (NPLM), which sits below the national A-League Men. Prior to 2014, the league was known as the Northern NSW State Football League (1998–2013) and Northern First Division (1959–1997).

== History ==
After Sydney clubs broke away from the NSW Football Association in 1958, the Northern NSW Soccer Federation was created by Newcastle and Coalfields clubs.

A 12 team Northern First Division was established with: Adamstown, Awaba, Blacksmith Rangers, Cardiff, Cessnock, Charlestown United, Lake Macquarie, Mayfield United, Merewether Advance, Newcastle Austral, Wallsend and West Wallsend.

The league, jointly with other state-based leagues, formed the highest tier of soccer in Australia until the creation of a national league, the National Soccer League (NSL), in 1977.

In 1960 the league was downsized to 10 teams with the relegation of Charlestown United and Merewether Advance to Division 2.

In 1969 the league increased to 12 teams with Cardiff and Cessnock promoted from Division 2 and no relegations that season.

Between 1982 and 1991 the league fluctuated in size between 10 and 12 teams and settled at 10 teams in 1992 until 2009.

For the 2009 season it was decided by NNSW to downsize the league to 8 teams to improve the quality and give local players a chance to enter the A-league through the competition. Highfields Azzurri and Lake Macquarie City were both demoted to the Northern NSW State League. Clubs were assessed on a set criterion which included facilities/ground (30%), financial status (25%), management (20%), playing strength/coaching staff (15%) and development program (10%). An independent body, chaired by former NSW gaming minister Richard Face, was assigned to make the decision.

In 2012 the competition increased to 10 teams with the inclusion of the Newcastle Jets Youth and the promotion of Charlestown City Blues.

In 2017 the competition increased to 11 teams with Lake Macquarie promoted from the Northern League One.

The 2020 season, contracted back to 10 teams after Newcastle Jets Youth moved into the NPL New South Wales structure, playing in the Sydney-based competition.

In 2022 the competition increased back to 11 teams with the promotion of Cooks Hill United, from Northern League One.

In 2023 the competition increased to 12 teams with the promotion of New Lambton, from Northern League One.

== Format ==
The competition consists of twelve teams from around the Lower Hunter. As part of the NPL NNSWF participation conditions, in addition to the First Grade, clubs also field a reserves team and Premier Youth League teams.

The regular season takes place over 22 rounds, with each team playing each other at home and away. The team that finishes first at the end of the regular season are Premiers. The top 5 teams at the end of the regular season qualify for a finals series, with the winner of the Grand final being crowned as the NPL NNSW Champions. An example of the finals series format is shown below from the 2024 season.

Qualifying final
2	Lambton Jaffas	0
3	Edgeworth FC	2
4	Charlestown Azzurri	2
5	Newcastle Olympic	0

Major semi-final
1	Broadmeadow Magic	2
2	Edgeworth FC	0
Minor semi-final
3	Lambton Jaffas	0
5	Charlestown Azzurri	4

Preliminary final
2	Edgeworth FC	3
3	Charlestown Azzurri	1

Grand final
1	Broadmeadow Magic (p)	2 (4)
2	Edgeworth FC	2 (3)

== Promotion and relegation ==
In 2024 promotion and relegation between the NPL and Northern League One was re-introduced.

The team finishing last (12th) of the NPL will be automatically relegated to Northern League One.

The team finishing second last (11th) will enter the promotion and relegation playoffs which will follow the following format:

- Playoff Semi-final 1 (played over 2 home and away legs): NPL 11th v Northern League One 4th
- Playoff Semi-final 2 (played over 2 home and away legs): Northern League One 2nd v Northern League One 3rd
- Playoff Final (played as a single leg): Winner of Playoff Semi-final 1 v Winner of Playoff Semi-final 2

The winner of the Playoff Final will be included in the NPL for the following season, with the losing team competing in Northern League One.

== Clubs ==
The following 12 clubs competed in the NPL NNSW for the 2026 season.

Club	Nickname(s)	Founded	LGA	Ground	Location	Capacity
Adamstown Rosebud	Buds	1889	Newcastle	Adamstown Oval	Adamstown	1,500
Belmont Swansea United	Belswans	1935	Lake Macquarie	Blacksmiths Oval	Blacksmiths	500
Broadmeadow Magic	Magic	1966	Newcastle	Magic Park	Broadmeadow	1,500
Charlestown Azzurri	Azzurri	1963	Lake Macquarie	Lisle Carr Oval	Whitebridge	1,000
Cooks Hill United	Cookers	1997	Newcastle	Fearnley Dawes Athletic Centre / No.2 Sportsground	Newcastle West	750
Edgeworth Eagles	Eagles	1892	Lake Macquarie	Jack McLaughlan Oval	Edgeworth	1,000
Lambton Jaffas	Jaffas	1957	Newcastle	Arthur Edden Oval	Lambton	1,000
Maitland	Magpies	1961	Maitland	Cooks Square Park	East Maitland	1,000
Kahibah FC	Rams	1924	Lake Macquarie	Harry Knight Oval	Gateshead	300
Newcastle Olympic	Warriors	1976	Newcastle	Darling Street Oval	Hamilton	500
Valentine	Phoenix	1994	Lake Macquarie	CB Complex	Valentine	300
Weston Bears	Bears	1907	Cessnock	Hunter City Motor Group Stadium	Weston	1,000

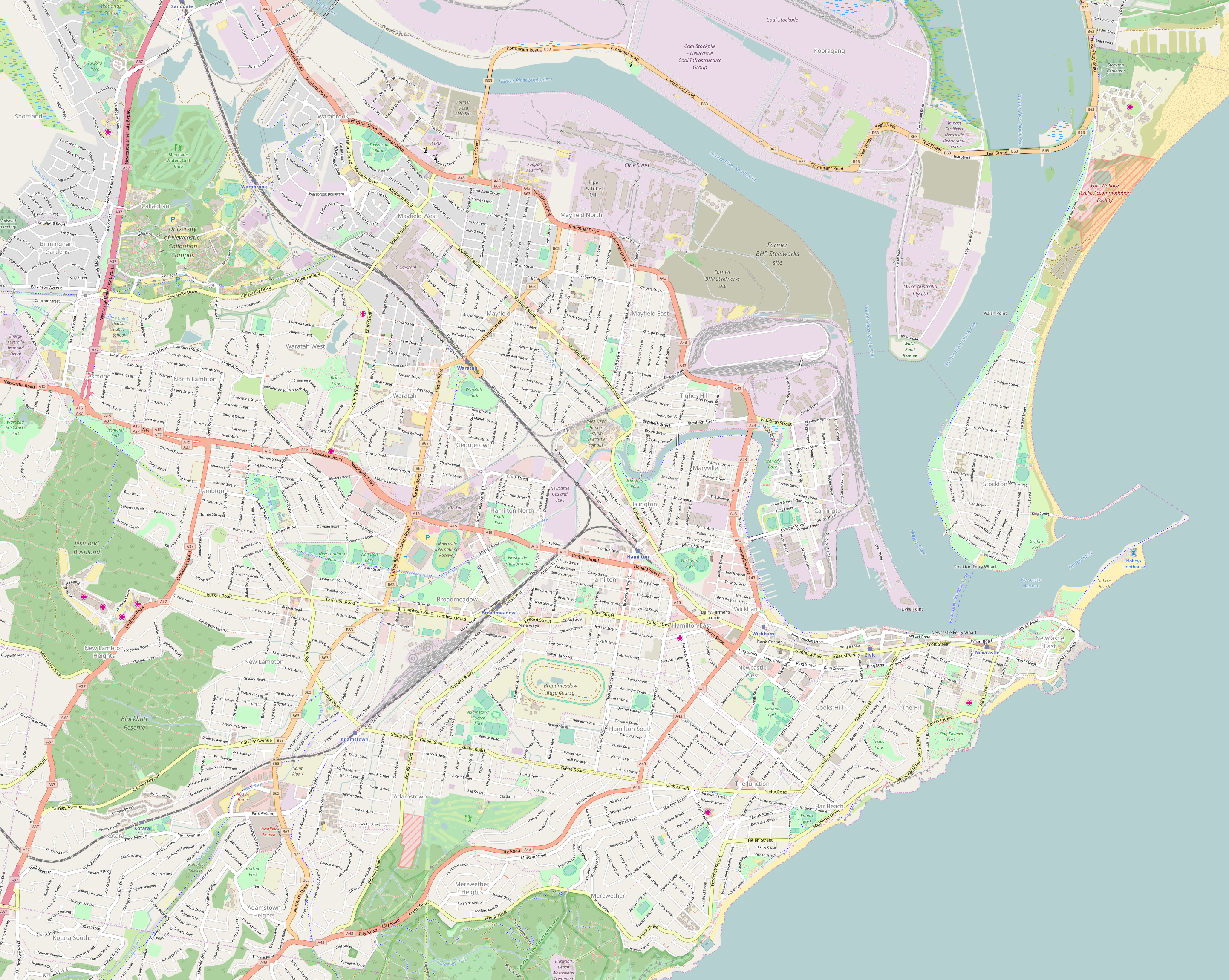
Location of 2025 NPL NNSW clubs within metropolitan Newcastle
Location of 2025 NPL NNSW clubs

== Honours ==
=== NNSW NPL ===
Season	Premiers	Champions	Score	Runners up
2014	Newcastle Jets Youth	Lambton Jaffas	2–0	Weston Bears
2015	Edgeworth Eagles	Edgeworth Eagles	2–0	Hamilton Olympic
2016	Edgeworth Eagles	Edgeworth Eagles	2–1	Broadmeadow Magic
2017	Edgeworth Eagles	Lambton Jaffas	2–0 (a.e.t.)	Edgeworth Eagles
2018	Edgeworth Eagles	Broadmeadow Magic	3–0	Edgeworth Eagles
2019	Maitland	Edgeworth Eagles	2–0	Maitland
2020	Edgeworth Eagles	Edgeworth Eagles	1–0	Maitland
2021	Lambton Jaffas	Cancelled due to the COVID-19 pandemic in Australia		
2022	Maitland	Lambton Jaffas	1–0	Maitland
2023	Lambton Jaffas	Lambton Jaffas	2–1	Broadmeadow Magic
2024	Broadmeadow Magic	Broadmeadow Magic	2–2 (4–3(p))	Edgeworth Eagles
2025	Broadmeadow Magic	Broadmeadow Magic	2–0	Lambton Jaffas
2026	Broadmeadow Magic	Weston Bears	2–0	Maitland

=== Northern First Division (1959–1997) ===
Season	Premiers	Champions	Score	Runners up
1959	Wallsend	Wallsend	4–0	West Wallsend
1960	Cessnock	Cessnock	2–0	Wallsend
1961	Awaba	Adamstown Rosebud	2–0	Lake Macquarie City
1962	Adamstown Rosebud	Lake Macquarie City	5–0	Awaba
1963	Wallsend	Awaba	4–1 (a.e.t.)	Wallsend
1964	Lake Macquarie City	Awaba	4–2	Wallsend
1965	Wallsend	Wallsend	3–1	Adamstown Rosebud
1966	Adamstown Rosebud	Austral United	2–1 (a.e.t.)	Adamstown Rosebud
1967	Austral United	Lake Macquarie City	6–2 (a.e.t.)	Austral United
1968	Adamstown Rosebud	Adamstown Rosebud	4–2	Lake Macquarie City
1969	Hamilton Azzurri	Austral United	3–2	Weston Bears
1970	Adamstown Rosebud	Belmont Swansea United	4–3	Adamstown Rosebud
1971	Weston Bears	Weston Bears	5–0	Wallsend
1972	Weston Bears	Weston Bears	3–0	Toronto Awaba
1973	Weston Bears	Weston Bears	4–1	Adamstown Rosebud
1974	New Lambton South	Weston Bears	3–2	Adamstown Rosebud
1975	Adamstown Rosebud	Adamstown Rosebud	2–1 (a.e.t.)	Weston Bears
1976	Adamstown Rosebud	Adamstown Rosebud	3–0	Wallsend
1977	Weston Bears	Weston Bears	1–0	Edgeworth Eagles
1978	Edgeworth Eagles	Edgeworth Eagles	2–0	Weston Bears
1979	Edgeworth Eagles	Highfields Azzurri	3–2	Weston Bears
1980	Maitland	Maitland	5–1	Highfields Azzurri
1981	Highfields Azzurri	Highfields Azzurri	2–1	Maitland
1982	Lake Macquarie City	Weston Bears	2–0	West Wallsend
1983	Central Coast	Weston Bears	3–0	Central Coast
1984	Cardiff	Weston Bears	0–0 (7–5(p))	West Wallsend
1985	Belmont-Swansea United	West Wallsend	2–1	Belmont-Swansea United
1986	West Wallsend	Belmont-Swansea United	0–0 (4–2(p))	West Wallsend
1987	Adamstown Rosebud	Austral United	3–2	Adamstown Rosebud
1988	Adamstown Rosebud	West Wallsend	2–1	Adamstown Rosebud
1989	Adamstown Rosebud	Weston Bears	1–0	Adamstown Rosebud
1990	Adamstown Rosebud	Weston Bears	1–1 (4–3(p))	Adamstown Rosebud
1991	Adamstown Rosebud	Adamstown Rosebud	1–1 (5–4(p))	Weston Bears
1992	Highfields Azzurri	West Wallsend	2–1	Wickham Park Croatia
1993	Highfields Azzurri	Highfields Azzurri	3–0	Lake Macquarie City
1994	Highfields Azzurri	Highfields Azzurri	2–1	Wickham Park Croatia
1995	Highfields Azzurri	Weston Bears	5–0	Wallsend
1996	Weston Bears	Highfields Azzurri	3–2	Weston Bears
1997	Broadmeadow Magic	Highfields Azzurri	3–1	Broadmeadow Magic

=== Northern NSW State League (1998–2013) ===
Season	Premiers	Champions	Score	Runners up
1998	Edgeworth Eagles	Hamilton Olympic	2–1	Broadmeadow Magic
1999	Edgeworth Eagles	Hamilton Olympic	4–0	Adamstown Rosebud
2000	Edgeworth Eagles	Hamilton Olympic	3–0	Edgeworth Eagles
2001	Broadmeadow Magic	Hamilton Olympic	2–0	Highfields Azzurri
2002	Edgeworth Eagles	Highfields Azzurri	1–0 (a.e.t.)	Edgeworth Eagles
2003	Broadmeadow Magic	Edgeworth Eagles	2–1	Broadmeadow Magic
2004	Weston Bears	Broadmeadow Magic	3–1	Weston Bears
2005	Broadmeadow Magic	Broadmeadow Magic	2–1	South Cardiff
2006	Edgeworth Eagles	Lake Macquarie City	4–1	Edgeworth Eagles
2007	Lake Macquarie City	Hamilton Olympic	1–0	Edgeworth Eagles
2008	Broadmeadow Magic	Broadmeadow Magic	0–0 (4–3(p))	Highfields Azzurri
2009	Edgeworth Eagles	Hamilton Olympic	2–1	Valentine Phoenix
2010	Weston Bears	Edgeworth Eagles	4–2	Weston Bears
2011	Broadmeadow Magic	Broadmeadow Magic	4–4 (4–3(p))	South Cardiff
2012	Hamilton Olympic	Broadmeadow Magic	4–1	Hamilton Olympic
2013	Broadmeadow Magic	Broadmeadow Magic	4–1	Lambton Jaffas

=== Titles (1959–present) ===
Premiers		Champions		Runners Up (Note: The NNSW grand final runners-up.)	
Edgeworth Eagles	13	Weston Bears	12	Adamstown Rosebud	10
Adamstown Rosebud	11	Broadmeadow Magic	9	Weston Bears	9
Broadmeadow Magic	10	Edgeworth Eagles	7	Edgeworth Eagles	8
Weston Bears	7	Highfields Azzurri	7	Wallsend	6
Highfields Azzurri	5	Hamilton Olympic	6	Broadmeadow Magic	5
Lake Macquarie City	3	Adamstown Rosebud	5	West Wallsend	4
Maitland	3	Lambton Jaffas	4	Highfields Azzurri	3
Wallsend	3	Austral United	3	Lake Macquarie City	3
Lambton Jaffas	2	Lake Macquarie City	3	Maitland	2
Austral United	1	West Wallsend	3	Hamilton Olympic	2
Awaba	1	Awaba	2	Lambton Jaffas	2
Belmont-Swansea United	1	Wallsend	2	South Cardiff	2
Cardiff	1	Belmont Swansea United	1	Wickham Park Croatia	2
Cessnock	1	Cessnock	1	Austral United	1
Hamilton Azzurri	1	Maitland	1	Awaba	1
Hamilton Olympic	1			Belmont-Swansea United	1
New Lambton South	1			Toronto Awaba	1
Newcastle Jets Youth	1			Valentine Phoenix	1
West Wallsend	1				

=== NPL Finals series representation ===
Up to the 2019 season, one representative from each Member Federation participated in the NPL Championship, a knock-out competition to determine a national champion.

Year	Team	Result
2014	Weston Workers	Quarter Finalist
2015	Edgeworth Eagles	Quarter Finalist
2016	Edgeworth Eagles	Runners up
2017	Edgeworth Eagles	Semi Finalist
2018	Edgeworth Eagles	Quarter Finalist
2019	Maitland FC	Semi Finalist
2020	Cancelled due to the COVID-19 pandemic in Australia.	

=== Australian Championship representation ===
From the 2025 season, one representative from each Member Federation participates in the Australian Championship. The Premiers from the NNSW NPL competition qualifies for this tournament.

Year	Team	Result
2025	Broadmeadow Magic	Group Stage (4th)
2026	Broadmeadow Magic	
