= Lambton Jaffas FC =

Australian soccer club

- Full name: Lambton Jaffas Football Club
- Nickname: Jaffas
- Founded: 1957
- Ground: Arthur Edden Oval
- Capacity: 2,000
- Coordinates: 32.918883°S 151.720296°E
- Head coach: Paul Gomez
- League: NPL NNSW
- 2026: 8th of 12
Home colours	Away colours

Lambton Jaffas Football Club is an Australian soccer club based in Lambton a suburb of Newcastle, New South Wales. Lambton Jaffas currently compete in the Northern NSW Football National Premier Leagues NNSW competition; the highest division of the NNSW Football Leagues and the second tier of soccer in Australia.

The badge for Lambton Jaffas has a thistle at the heart of the badge, a hark back to the first football club in Northern NSW, the Lambton Thistles formed in 1885, with a top and bottom ribbon framing it. The motto on the lower ribbon reads "Capite non captivos" that translates to "Take no Prisoners". On either side of the badge are stylized footballs, reinforcing the sport and the club’s purpose.

The club colours are Gold and Black changing from the traditional Yellow and Brown in 2018.

The Seniors home ground is Arthur Edden Oval in New Lambton since 1969, except for one season in 1976. The Juniors play their home games at Harry Edwards Oval and Lambton No. 1 Oval, both in Lambton Park.

== History ==
In 1957 Lambton Soccer Club, was established. In 1978, Ernie Lamb had to differentiate between a newly formed 'All Age' and the 2nd Division senior club, and the name Jaffas was first formally used. Originally, the club had one committee each to run the Junior and Senior teams. However, in 1980 two committees were formed. The club was incorporated as Lambton Jaffas Soccer Club in 1987, with a Juniors and Seniors division. In 2008, Lambton became a Football Club.

The club prospered during the 1960s, with the clubs first All Age side being established in 1968. In 1969, the club was invited by the Northern NSW Soccer Federation to participate in the 1970 Northern NSW Second Division to replace Dudley Redhead. The club played under the name of Dudley Lambton that year to fulfill the Federation's obligations to the English Soccer Pools.

In 1975, Lambton Jaffas made the NNSW Second Division finals for the first time. Grand Final wins in 1990,1997,1998 were achieved along with Grand Final appearances in 1991, 2007 & 2011.

After 42 years of amateur football the seniors club became semi-professional in 2010.

In 2012 Lambton Jaffas were crowned Champions and Grand Final winners of Northern NSW First Division and subsequently promoted to the NNSW State League.

2013 was the clubs first year in the NBN State Football League. Making the Grand Final in their first year.

2014 was a break-through year for the Jaffas, taking part in the inaugural National Premier Leagues Northern NSW. In only their second year in the top division of NNSW football, Lambton Jaffas won the Grand Final 2–0, beating Weston Workers Bears.

In 2016, the club qualified for the FFA Cup regular rounds for the first time, exiting the competition in the Round of 32, losing 1 - 0 to NPL Tasmania side Devonport City FC. In 2024 they took on A-League side Melbourne Victory in the Round of 32 losing 4 - 1.

=== Divisional history ===
Seasons	Division
1970 - 1981	Northern NSW Second Division
1982 - 1987	Northern NSW Third Division
1988 - 1997	Northern NSW Second Division
1998 - 2012	Northern NSW First Division
2013–Present	Northern NSW State League / NPL

== Honours ==
- NPL Northern NSW Premiers: 2021, 2023
- NPL Northern NSW Grand Final winners: 2014, 2017, 2022, 2023
- NPL Northern NSW Grand Final runners-up: 2013, 2025
- NNSW Second Division Grand Premiers: 2012
- NNSW Second Division Grand Final winners: 1990, 1997, 1998, 2012
- NNSW Second Division Grand Final runners-up: 1991, 2007, 2011
- NNSW Football State Cup winners: 2024
- NNSW HMRI Charity Shield: winners: 2025

== Coaches ==
2008 – 2015	David Tanchevski	NNSW First Division / NNSW NPL
2016 – 2021	James Pascoe	NNSW NPL
2021 – 2022	Shane Pryce	NNSW NPL
2023 – 2026	David Tanchevski	NNSW NPL
2027 – present	Paul Gomez	NNSW NPL

== Current squad ==
Note: Flags indicate national team as defined under FIFA eligibility rules; some limited exceptions apply. Players may hold more than one non-FIFA nationality.

No.	Pos.	Nation	Player
2		AUS	Matthew Buettner
3	MF	AUS	Pat Bond
4		AUS	Nathan Verity
5		AUS	Dylan Newbold
6		AUS	Joseph Langlois
7		AUS	Lachlan Graham
8		AUS	James Oates
10	FW	AUS	Archie Finn
11		AUS	Lachlan Griffiths
14		AUS	Riley Taylor
15	FW	AUS	Sam Donnellan
16	FW	AUS	Thomas Parkes

No.	Pos.	Nation	Player
18		AUS	Bailey Newton
20		AUS	Liam Michels
23		AUS	Jagger Wholert
—	GK	AUS	Ethan Lewis
—		AUS	Charlie Kelly
—		AUS	Sakeel Balfour Brown
—		AUS	Kaleb Cox
—		AUS	Reece Papadimitrios
—		AUS	Spencer Morris
—		AUS	Michael Finlayson
—		AUS	Samuel Webb
—		JPN	Yuhei Sato
