= Weston Bears FC =

- Full name: Weston Bears Football Club
- Nickname: Bears
- Founded: 1907
- Ground: Weston Bears Park
- Capacity: 1000
- Coordinates: 32.813650°S 151.466004°E
- Chairman: Rod Henderson
- Head Coach: Damian Zane
- League: NPL NNSW
- 2026: 3rd of 12
- Website: http://www.westonfc.com.au/
Home colours	Away colours

Weston Bears Football Club is an Australian semi-professional soccer club based in Weston, New South Wales. At its senior level the club participates in the National Premier Leagues Northern NSW, the highest tier of Northern New South Wales Football and the second tier of Australian football after the A-League.

== History ==
Three Weston football clubs were formed in 1907; Weston Advance, Weston United and Weston Albions. The Bears are also credited as being founded in 1907 by coalminers who worked at the Hebburn Colliery.

The Bears have spent the majority of their 100-year history in the top flight of local football, winning 14 Grand Finals, 9 Premierships and 9 Club Championships.

In 2025, Weston Bears FC was granted $3 million in funding to refurbish Weston Bears Park.

== Club colours ==
Weston wear Black and White striped jerseys, with black shorts and black socks with white trimming.

It is thought that Weston chose these colours due to the large number of English coalminers hailing from Newcastle-Upon-Tyne who settled in the region and helped to set up Weston Workers Football Club.

Weston's away strip is currently a fluoro yellow jersey with black trim.

During the 1980s, Weston wore a yellow away strip, which resulted in the fans referring to the team as 'The Canaries' for a short period.

== Home ground ==
Weston play their home games at Hunter City Motor Group Stadium, formerly known as Rockwell Automation Park (sometimes referred to as Bear Park). Weston Bears Park has been home to the Bears since 1955. The park has two grandstands: the main stand and members stand for club members.

== Recent seasons ==
Weston's performances in recent seasons of the NBN State League: *2010: Deserved Minor Premiers finishing the year on 39 points in 1st place.

- 2009: Finished 7th
- 2008: 4th on 32 points. 2 goals from Grand Final berth.
- 2007: 7th on 23 points.
- 2006: 8th place on 17 points.
- 2005: 4th place on 28 points. Defeated 3–0 in Minor Semi Final by South Cardiff
- 2004: 1st place on 42 points. Defeated 3–1 in Grand Final by Broadmeadow Magic FC
- 2003: 3rd place on 36 points. Defeated by Edgeworth Eagles FC in Semi-final
- 2002: 6th place on 22 points.
- 2001: 6th place on 16 points.
- 2000: 11th place on 12 points. (NBN State League contained 12 teams from 1998 until the 2000 season)
- 1999: 7th place on 22 points. (NBN State League contained 12 teams from 1998 until the 2000 season)
- 1998: 10th place on 28 points. (NBN State League contained 12 teams from 1998 until the 2000 season)
- 1997: 5th place on 28 points.
- 1996: 1st place on 48 points.
- 1995: 3rd place on 38 points.
- 1994: –
- 1993: 6th place on 30 points.
- 1992: 6th place on 28 points.

=== 2006 season ===
After qualifying for the semi-finals against expectations in the 2005 season, the 2006 season was expected to be difficult for the Bears.

The losses of Brad Swancott and James Monie to Broadmeadow Magic FC and Azzurri FC respectively were major blows for Weston, however the fans still held out hope that the young Bears team would be able to compete in the State League.

Weston struggled to string wins together throughout the season. Weston at times started to look like they had hit form, with wins such as the 4–1 victory over South Cardiff Gunners in Round 6, however they would often follow up with a lacklustre performance, such as the 7–0 defeat against Azzurri in Round 7.

Three-quarters of the way through the season, Weston looked as though they might be about to be dragged into a relegation dogfight with Adamstown Rosebud, however a win against South Cardiff in Round 15 followed by a 2–1 victory against Azzurri in Round 16 ensured the Bears would be in the State League for another season at least. Weston finished the season in 8th position.

The highlight of the 2006 season was the finals campaign of the Reserve Grade team. After finishing 4th on the table, the Reserves defeated Broadmeadow and Hamilton to qualify for the Grand Final, which they won 5–0 against Azzurri FC.

The Bears U19s team nearly made the semi-finals, finishing the season in 5th place.

The 2006 season was the last for Bears coach Trevor Morris who decided to step down after 4 years in the top job.

=== 2007 season ===
The 2007 season saw several new coaches join the club, with Michael Boogaard coaching 1st Grade, Chad Dobson mentoring the Reserves and Paul Waters taking the Youth Coach position. The coaching transition came along with six teams instead of five with a new junior team coming in, the new U/ 13s. In 2007 the Bears also upgraded to a special centennial strip which all six grades will wear. With a strong finish to the season the Bears came in 7th, just 2 wins outside the top 4. The Reserve and Youth teams didn't fare any better, finishing 9th and 10th respectively.

During the season the Bears celebrated the 100-year milestone for the club. Over 300 supporters, officials and ex players attended the dinner which saw the Team of the Century named. The team featured 14 Bear legends – Jack Avis Snr, John Bond, Jack Gilmore, Warren Halverson, Roy Johnson, Dennis King, Jack Manion, Jim McNabb, Tom Oliver, Tom Snedden, John J Turnbull, John T Turnbull, Jim Wilkinson, and Jim Williams.

=== 2008 season ===
The 101st season for the Bears would prove to be a very successful one. The young side had been kept together and continued to improve and fight out results against the top teams in the competition. Former Bear Steve Turnbull took over reserve grade and Steve Thomson coaching the new 17's team. The Bears also revealed a new strip reverting to thick black and white vertical stripes.

First Grade were the surprise packets of the competition, finishing 4th. Although the Bears went into the finals with high hopes they were outplayed in the first leg by Minor Premiers Broadmeadow Magic losing 3–0. Needing a victory by 4 goals, chances of progressing seemed impossible. Most people did not give the Bears a chance but going into half time with a 2–0 lead gave hope to the Bears faithful. Broadmeadow struck back almost immediately after break, meaning Weston needed another 2 goals to advance. A penalty to the Bears put them up 3–1, Magic replied 2 minutes later ending the Grand Final hopes for the Bears.

Reserve grade started the season strongly and were right in the mix for the finals but results did not go their way and they finished equal 5th with Edgeworth just 3 points outside the 4.

The under-19s had horror start to the season with 8 straight loses putting pressure on the team. Their first win was very emotional, it put some self belief back into the team and they improved on last years performance finishing 9th on 13 points.

The 17's weren't expected to be much trouble in this competition, but with a core of players playing together for the past several years they upset many teams and had 2 losses in the first 14 rounds of the competition. But a string of draws and loses in the final rounds saw the young Bears miss out on the finals on 1 goal difference.

There was also some personal recognition for the Bears with striker Rhys Tippett being named NBN State League Player of the Year, also with him, Tim Pratt and Nathan Morris were selected in the NBN Select Team for a trial against the Newcastle Jets.

== Current Senior squad ==
Note: Flags indicate national team as defined under FIFA eligibility rules; some limited exceptions apply. Players may hold more than one non-FIFA nationality.

No.	Pos.	Nation	Player
20	GK	AUS	Gerard Roebuck
2	MF	AUS	Connor Heydon
3	DF	AUS	Mitch Dobson
4	DF	NED	Alessandro Ouwerkerk
5	DF	AUS	Joey O'Connor
6	DF	AUS	Chris Hurley (Captain)
7	FW	AUS	Dieuseul Kandundaho
8	MF	AUS	Liam Wilson
9	FW	AUS	Connor Evans
19	DF	AUS	Ryan Ensor

No.	Pos.	Nation	Player
12	MF	AUS	Cooper Buswell
13	DF	AUS	Cooper Sargent
14	MF	AUS	Paul Sichalwe
—	MF	AUS	Jacob Dundas
—	MF	AUS	Ben Clouten
—		AUS	Kayden Soper
—		AUS	Nelson King
—		AUS	Nick Turkington
—	GK	AUS	Jacob Zissis
—		AUS	Dylan Burston

== Rivalries ==
Weston's biggest rival are Cessnock City Hornets FC. Both clubs have enjoyed success at the top of local football over their histories, however Cessnock were relegated back to the NewFM 1st Division at the end of the 2005 season.

Maitland are also considered to be a local rival, however they have been in the NewFM 1st Division for many seasons, so the rivalry is somewhat inactive.

Weston also has minor rivalries with West Wallsend and Adamstown. West Wallsend have spent recent seasons in the 1st Division, but have been promoted back to the State League for the 2007 season, which will allow the two great clubs to renew their rivalry.

Sadly, however, Adamstown were the team to be relegated in order for West Wallsend to be promoted. The Rosebuds finished last in the State League in 2007, and hence will play the 2008 season in the NewFM 1st Division.

== Noted former players ==
- (Australia) Richard Johnson
- (Australia) Jimmy McNab
- (Australia) James Wilkinson
- (Australia) Stuart Musialik
- (Australia) Nigel Boogaard
- (Australia) Brad Swancott
- (Australia) Anthony Surjan
- (Australia) James Monie
- (Scotland) James Sloan

== Honours ==
- Grand Finals: 1971, 1972, 1973, 1974, 1977, 1981, 1982, 1983, 1984, 1989, 1990, 1993, 1995, 2026
- Premierships: 1931, 1936, 1971, 1972, 1973, 1977, 1980, 1996, 2004, 2010
- Club Championships: 1974, 1977, 1979, 1980, 1981, 1982, 1983, 1996, 2004
- The club has also won the numerous State and Local Cups that have been in existence over the years, including the Stevenson Cup, Ampol Cup, Hemmings Cup, BP Cup, State Cup, Alcan Cup, Gardiner Cup, Kerr Cup, Tycon Cup and Shehan Cup.
