= Broadmeadow Magic FC =

Broadmeadow Magic
- Full name: Broadmeadow Magic Football Club
- Nicknames: Magic; Magicians; Newcastle Macedonia
- Founded: 1966
- Ground: Magic Park
- Capacity: 3,500
- Coordinates: 32.920466°S 151.731005°E
- President: Andrew Bozinovski
- Head coach: Jim Cresnar
- League: NPL NNSW
- 2026: 1st of 12 (premiers)
Home colours	Away colours

Broadmeadow Magic Football Club is an Australian semi-professional soccer club based in Broadmeadow, a suburb of Newcastle, New South Wales. The club currently competes in the National Premier Leagues Northern NSW and they also as invitee in Australian Championship after winning as premiers in 2026 NPL NNSW season with matches played at Magic Park.

== History ==
The club was founded on 9 April 1966 by Macedonian Australians as Newcastle Macedonia FC. Originally formed as a social club to play football together with other Macedonians, it has become one of the largest and most successful clubs in Newcastle. The club saw its first action on 20 March 1967 when they travelled to Evans Park to face Cardiff Workers RSL. The hosts were upset however, with Macedonia winning the match, 2–1.

Throughout the years, Broadmeadow have gone through a series of name changes. The club was known as Broadmeadow United from 1971 until 1974 and then enjoyed a period of success in the 1970s as Hamilton Red Star. In 1975, Red Star was promoted to the Northern NSW Soccer Federation 4th division, the 3rd division in 1976, the 2nd division in 1978 and finally the 1st Division in 1980. By 1985, Red Star was relegated back to the 2nd division, and had reverted to its original name, Newcastle Macedonia. During 10 years of competing in the 2nd division, Newcastle Macedonia won the league title twice.

In 1995, Newcastle Macedonia was finally promoted back to the highest flight in New South Wales, the NBN State Football League. The club made its final name change to its current, Broadmeadow Magic FC, but struggled in its first 2 years in the new league. Richard Hartley was appointed as the club's coach in 1997 who led the club to their first league title in the same year. Broadmeadow Magic remained successful in the first decade of the 2000s, as head coach Damien Smith led the club to their third league title in 2003, the club's first grand final title in 2004, and both titles in 2005. Broadmeadow won its 5th league title in 2008, but disappointingly finished 3rd in the league in 2009.

Broadmeadow has produced a number of players who have gone on to play for the Newcastle Jets in the A-League. Notable players include Ben Kantarovski, Ben Kennedy, and Peter Haynes. The club was co-coached by Damien Smith and Robert Virgilli during the 2010 season, which was a disappointing one for Broadmeadow. They finished the season in 6th place and missed out on the finals.

Broadmeadow were champions in the 2012 and 2014 editions of the NNSWF State Cup.

=== 2014–Present: National Premier Leagues Northern NSW, NNSWF State Cup and Australia Cup ===
The club's first season in the newly established National Premier Leagues Northern NSW, what was formerly the Northern NSW State Football League, saw them finish in 9th place.

On Tuesday 29 July 2014, Broadmeadow hosted the inaugural FFA Cup game against Brisbane Strikers at Magic Park. The game was won 2–1 by Brisbane Strikers after going to extra time.

On 29 July 2015, Broadmeadow lost 3–1 to Heidelberg United FC at Magic Park in the FFA Cup.

On 7 May 2016, Jon Griffiths reached 100 caps for the club.

On 2 August 2017, Broadmeadow lost 4–2 to Moreton Bay United at Wolter Park in the FFA Cup.

On 25 July 2018, Broadmeadow defeated Canberra FC 4–1 at Deakin Stadium to progress to the Round of 16 of the FFA Cup for the first time. Magic were then knocked out of the competition after losing 4–0 to Bentleigh Greens at Magic Park.

On 10 November 2021, Broadmeadow hosted Western Sydney Wanderers FC at No.2 Sportground in Newcastle West in the FFA Cup. Western Sydney defeated Magic 3–0.

On 21 July 2022, Broadmeadow were again drawn against Bentleigh Greens in the Australia Cup. Bentleigh Greens won the match 2–1 in extra time at Kingston Heath Soccer Complex.

On 29 July 2023, Broadmeadow were cup champions for the third time in 2023 editions of the NNSWF State Cup.

On 4th August 2023, Broadmeadow lost 4–2 to Sydney United at Magic Park in the Australia Cup.

In 2025 end of season, The club will also compete in the inaugural edition of the Australian Championship after finishing 1st in the regular season of the 2025 NPL NNSW.

== Current squad ==
As of 15 October 2026

Note: Flags indicate national team as defined under FIFA eligibility rules; some limited exceptions apply. Players may hold more than one non-FIFA nationality.

No.	Pos.	Nation	Player
1	GK	AUS	Daniel Axford
2	DF	AUS	Adam Sherrat
3	DF	AUS	Ben Diamond
4	DF	AUS	Thomas Beecham
5	DF	AUS	William Ingram
6	MF	AUS	Luke Cororan
8	MF	AUS	Jack Simmons
9	FW	MEX	Luis Lara Delgardo
10	MF	AUS	Bailey Wells
11	FW	AUS	Jarred Baker
12	FW	AUS	Orlando Heigl
14	MF	AUS	Regan Jose
15	FW	AUS	Zac Waddall
16		AUS	Jake Callen
17	DF	AUS	Ezra Palombini

No.	Pos.	Nation	Player
18	DF	AUS	Joey Cresnar
19	FW	AUS	Keanu Moore
20	DF	AUS	Jeremy Wilson
21	MF	AUS	James Cresnar
22	FW	CAN	Joel Badger
23	DF	AUS	Jakob Cresnar
44	GK	AUS	Jeremiah Cleur
66	GK	AUS	Noah James
—	FW	AUS	Jesse Hill
—	DF	AUS	William De Vitis
—	MF	AUS	Riley Smith
—	FW	AUS	Angus McLeod
—	MF	AUS	Kruz Dodo
—		AUS	Bailey Antcliff
—	FW	AUS	Max Langworthy

== Achievements ==
- NBN State League/NPL Northern NSW Premiership:
  - Winners (10): 1997, 2001, 2003, 2005, 2008, 2011, 2013, 2024, 2025, 2026
- NBN State league/NPL Northern NSW Championship:
  - Winners (9): 2004, 2005, 2008, 2011, 2012, 2013, 2018, 2024, 2025
  - Runners-up (4): 1997, 1998, 2003, 2023
- State League 1/State League Division Premiership:
  - Winners (1): 1993
- NNSW Football State Cup:
  - Winners (3): 2012, 2014, 2023
- NNSW HMRI Charity Shield:
  - Winners (2): 2024, 2026
- President's Cup:
  - Winners (2): 2002, 2008
- Northern NSW Herald Premier League/Northern NSW NPL Women Premiership:
  - Winners (2): 2021, 2023
- Northern NSW Herald Premier League/Northern NSW NPL Women Championship:
  - Winners (1): 2023
- Maso Cup:
  - Winners (1): 2018
