= Adamstown Rosebud FC =

Adamstown Rosebud
- Full name: Adamstown Rosebud Football Club (formerly Newcastle Rosebud)
- Nicknames: Rosebuds; Buds
- Founded: 12 July 1889; 137 years ago
- Ground: Adamstown Oval
- Capacity: 2,500
- Coordinates: 32°56′00.8″S 151°43′50″E
- President: Rick Naylor
- Head Coach: Chris Moylan
- League: NPL NNSW
- 2026: 9th of 12
- Website: http://www.adamstownrosebudfc.org.au/
Home colours	Away colours

Adamstown Rosebud Football Club is a semi-professional Australian soccer club based in Adamstown a suburb of Newcastle, New South Wales. Adamstown Rosebud currently competes in the Northern NSW Football National Premier Leagues NNSW competition; the highest division of the NNSW Football Leagues and the second tier of soccer in Australia.

Founded in 1889, Adamstown Rosebud is widely recognised as the oldest NPL club in Australia.

Adamstown Rosebud competed in the National Soccer League between 1984 and 1986, playing under the name Newcastle Rosebud United during its time in the national competition.

In 2019, the club celebrated its 130th year of competition. To mark the milestone, Adamstown Rosebud wore a special commemorative strip honouring both its long history and the Australian representatives the club has produced.

The badge for Adamstown Rosebud is a classic circular football crest, built around a central rose emblem, the defining symbol of Adamstown Rosebud FC. A horizontal banner runs across the rose with the founding year of 1889 on it. The club colours are Red and Green.

Adamstown Rosebud has played at Adamstown Oval since its formation in 1889, making the ground one of the oldest continuously used football venues in Australia.

== Early History ==
Adamstown Rosebud Football Club was established in 1889 following a public meeting held at Adamstown Park on 12 July of that year. The meeting resulted in the formation of a football club to represent the Adamstown district, with Peter Finlayson elected as the club's inaugural secretary. The selection of a club name was deferred until a subsequent meeting, at which a number of options were considered, including Athletic, Central, Wanderers, Rangers, Albion, The Pioneers, Rosebud, West End, Advance, Thistles and Pirates. "Rosebud" was ultimately chosen by a substantial majority of members.

The club's name is believed to have reflected the district's association with the rosebud horticultural variety and was regarded at the time as being distinctive among local sporting organisations. Adamstown's original playing colours were blue and white, although variations were used during the club's early years. The club later adopted its now traditional red and green colours.

Following its formation, Adamstown secured the use of Adamstown Park as its home ground and began preparations for entry into organised competition. On 12 July 1890, exactly one year after the club's establishment, Adamstown played its first official badge competition match, losing 2-0 to Minmi Rangers before a crowd of approximately 220 spectators.

The club secured its first major title in 1894, finishing level with Minmi Rangers at the top of the badge competition before defeating the Rangers 2–0 in the deciding final. Adamstown also claimed the Ellis Cup knockout competition in the same period.

=== Australian Representatives ===
Players who have played for both Adamstown and Australia

- Peter Doyle – 4 caps
- Lawson Bailey – 2 caps
- Art Lambert – 2 caps
- Arch Harris – 2 caps
- Alec Cameron – 15 caps
- Harold Robertson – 4 caps
- Gavin Russell – 2 caps
- Charlie O’Connor – 8 caps
- Bill Coolahan – 11 caps
- Bill Morgan – 8 caps
- Alf ‘Ducky’ Henwood – 3 caps
- Aub Mascord – 2 caps
- Vic Barnett – 1 cap
- Dave Coote – 2 caps
- Allan Johns – 15 caps
- Frank Parsons – 14 caps
- Cyril Nicholls – 1 cap
- Doug Wendt – 5 caps
- Bill Mahoney – 3 caps
- Spencer Kitching – 4 caps
- Ron Giles – 3 caps
- Ray Baartz – 59 caps
- Col Curran – 35 caps
- Peter Stone – 15 caps

== Committee ==
- Rick Naylor - President
- Amanda Sweeney – Secretary
- Natalie Fahey – Treasurer
- Brian Swaine – Football Director
- Warwick Belcher – Board Member
- Kieren Fitz-Gibbon – Board Member
- Chris Moylan – Board Member

== Current senior squad ==
Note: Flags indicate national team as defined under FIFA eligibility rules; some limited exceptions apply. Players may hold more than one non-FIFA nationality.

No.	Pos.	Nation	Player
1	GK	AUS	Tom Jenkins (Captain)
2	DF	AUS	Drew Greirson
3	DF	USA	Cameron De Jong
4	DF	AUS	Oliver Davies
5	DF	AUS	Callum Eardley
7	FW	AUS	Torren Blanch
8	MF	AUS	Denis Fajkovic
9	FW	AUS	Kyle Munns
10	MF	AUS	James Lowe

No.	Pos.	Nation	Player
12	MF	AUS	Levi Barclay
13	FW	AUS	Alex Mulrooney
14	DF	AUS	Joseph Licata
15	MF	AUS	Dane Lawther
16	DF	AUS	Nick Pettiford
17	DF	AUS	Brendan Knowles
18	GK	AUS	Brendan Short
19	FW	AUS	Manoli Papas
20	FW	AUS	Steven Stanton

== Staff ==
=== Coaching ===
Head Coach: David Rosewarne

- 1st Grade Assistant Coach: Chris Moylan
- Technical Director: Chris Dale

== Honours ==
- National Soccer League Cup Winner: 1984 (as Newcastle Rosebud United)
- Northern NSW First Division/NPL NNSW Minor Premier:

1894, 1895, 1896, 1905, 1909, 1910, 1962, 1966, 1968, 1975, 1976, 1987, 1988, 1989, 1990, 1991

- Northern NSW New FM Major Premier Champions 2008, 2013
- Northern NSW New FM Minor Premier Champions 2008, 2013
