= Newcastle Olympic FC =

Newcastle Olympic
- Full name: Newcastle Olympic Football Club
- Nickname: Warriors
- Founded: 1976
- Ground: Darling St Oval
- Capacity: 2,000
- Coordinates: 32.9342°S 151.7413°E
- President: George Sofianos
- Head Coach: Paul DeVitis
- League: NPL NNSW
- 2026: 10th of 12
- Website: https://nofc.com.au/

Newcastle Olympic Football Club is a semi-professional soccer club based in Hamilton a suburb of Newcastle, New South Wales. They currently compete in the National Premier Leagues Northern NSW, the second tier of football in Australia. They were known as Hamilton Olympic between 1992 and 2019.

== History ==
The club was established by Greek immigrants in the New South Wales city of Newcastle in 1976. They are one of the most successful football clubs in Newcastle.

== Honours ==
- Northern NSW Premier League Club Champions: 1998, 2000, 2001, 2007, 2012, 2016, 2017, 2018
- NBN State League Champions: 1998, 1999, 2000, 2001, 2007, 2009
- NBN State League Minor Premiers: 2012
- Midweek Cup: 1998
- President's Cup: 2001, 2004
- Charity Shield: 2009
- NBN State League Reserve Grade Champions: 1994, 1998, 2003, 2004, 2012
- NBN State League Reserve Grade Minor Premiers: 1997, 1998, 2000, 2003, 2004
- NBN State League Youth Champions: 2002, 2005, 2006, 2009
- NBN State League Youth Minor Premiers: 1994, 1998, 2006, 2008, 2009
- Division 2 Champions: 1991
- Division 2 Minor Premiers: 1991
- Division 3 Champions: 1990
- Division 3 Minor Premiers: 1990, 1979
- Division 4 Champions: 1978
- Division 4 Minor Premiers: 1989, 1978

Secondary Club Teams

- Zone Football League One Minor Premiers: 2026
- Inter-District Division 3 Minor Premiers: 2011

== Current squad ==
As of 8th December 2024

Note: Flags indicate national team as defined under FIFA eligibility rules; some limited exceptions apply. Players may hold more than one non-FIFA nationality.

No.	Pos.	Nation	Player
1	GK	AUS	Adam Pearce
3		AUS	Jye Rodway
4		AUS	Luke Rutledge
5		AUS	Marcus Duncan
7		AUS	Kale Bradbery
8	FW	AUS	Joshua Benson
11		AUS	Lachlan West
10		AUS	Rhys Cooper
11		AUS	Nathan Toby
12		AUS	Steven Theacos
13		AUS	Declan Hughes
14		AUS	Blake Green
15		AUS	Louis Townsend
16		AUS	Tommy O'Connor
19		AUS	Jed Hornery
20		AUS	Kane Treble
21	GK	AUS	Issac Quinn
22		AUS	Jack Read-Jones

No.	Pos.	Nation	Player
24		AUS	Elloit Paksec
25		AUS	Max Cotton
27		AUS	Riley Parker
29		AUS	Andrew Paksec
30		AUS	Scott Travis
31	GK	AUS	Cooper Bowden
32		AUS	Matt Hornery
33		AUS	Blake Clifton
34		AUS	Jesse Fitzgerald
35		AUS	Banjo Fitzgerald
36		AUS	Lucas Walshe
37		AUS	Bailey Middleton
38		AUS	Jayden Aitchison
39		AUS	Callum Priestly
40	GK	AUS	Bowen Stubbs
—	DF	AUS	Dominik Brymora
8		AUS	Benjamin Hay
—	DF	SCO	Ian Gordon
