= 2016 Northern NSW Football season =

Northern NSW Football
- Season: 2016
- Champions: Edgeworth Eagles

The 2016 Northern NSW Football season was the third season under the new competition format in northern New South Wales. The competition consisted of six divisions across the district. As Premiers for the NPL Northern NSW, Edgeworth Eagles qualified for the National Premier Leagues finals series, competing with the other state federation champions in a final knockout tournament to decide the National Premier Leagues Champion for 2016.

== League Tables ==
=== 2016 National Premier League Northern NSW ===
NPL Northern NSW
- Season: 2016
- Champions: Edgeworth Eagles
- Premiers: Edgeworth Eagles
- Relegated: -
- Top goalscorer: -

The 2016 National Premier League Northern NSW season was played over 18 rounds.

Pos	Team	Pld	W	D	L	GF	GA	GD	Pts	Qualification or relegation
1	Edgeworth FC (C)	18	15	1	2	52	19	+33	46	2016 National Premier Leagues Finals
2	Hamilton Olympic	18	12	6	0	49	13	+36	42	2016 Northern NSW Finals
3	Broadmeadow Magic	18	9	5	4	49	28	+21	32	2016 Northern NSW Finals
4	Maitland	18	8	5	5	34	23	+11	29	2016 Northern NSW Finals
5	Newcastle Jets Youth	18	7	3	8	38	46	−8	24	
6	Charlestown City Blues	18	7	3	8	29	41	−12	24	
7	Lambton Jaffas	18	5	4	9	27	35	−8	19	
8	Valentine FC	18	5	4	9	27	43	−16	19	
9	Adamstown Rosebud	18	3	2	13	21	53	−32	11	
10	Weston Workers	18	1	3	14	18	43	−25	6	

Source: foxsportspulse.com
Rules for classification: 1) points; 2) goal difference; 3) number of goals scored.
(C) Champions

==== Finals ====
Semi-finals
1	Edgeworth Eagles	2	2	4
4	Maitland	2	1	3
2	Hamilton Olympic	1	1	2
3	Broadmeadow Magic	3	2	5

Grand Final
1	Edgeworth Eagles	2
3	Broadmeadow Magic	1

=== 2016 Northern NSW State League Division 1 ===
Northern NSW State League Division 1
- Season: 2016
- Champions: -
- Promoted: Lake Macquarie City
- Matches: -
- Top goalscorer: -
- Biggest home win: -
- Biggest away win: -
- Highest scoring: -

The 2016 Northern NSW State League Division 1 season is the third season of the new Northern NSW State League Division 1 as the second level domestic association football competition in the district of Northern NSW. 11 teams will compete, all playing each other twice, for a total of 20 rounds. The top team at the end of the year is promoted to the 2017 National Premier Leagues Northern NSW, subject to meeting criteria.

Pos	Team	Pld	W	D	L	GF	GA	GD	Pts	Qualification or relegation
1	Lake Macquarie City (P)	20	17	1	2	80	24	+56	52	Promotion to the 2017 National Premier League Northern NSW
2	Belmont Swansea	20	14	2	4	48	23	+25	44	2016 Northern NSW State League Division 1 Finals
3	Kahibah	20	14	1	5	61	29	+32	43	2016 Northern NSW State League Division 1 Finals
4	Wallsend	20	12	1	7	38	30	+8	37	2016 Northern NSW State League Division 1 Finals
5	Thornton Redbacks	20	9	2	9	48	42	+6	29	
6	Singleton Strikers	20	6	5	9	35	39	−4	23	
7	West Wallsend	20	6	4	10	30	42	−12	22	
8	Cooks Hill United	20	6	2	12	37	54	−17	20	
9	South Cardiff	20	5	4	11	25	37	−12	19	
10	Toronto Awaba	20	5	1	14	25	70	−45	16	
11	Cessnock City	20	3	3	14	34	71	−37	12	

Source: foxsportspulse.com
Rules for classification: 1) points; 2) goal difference; 3) number of goals scored.
(P) Promoted

==== Finals ====
Semi-finals
1	Lake Macquarie City	1	0	1
4	Wallsend	1	1	2
2	Belmont Swansea United	1	1	2
3	Kahibah	1	0	1

Grand Final
2	Belmont Swansea United	0 (3)
4	Wallsend	0 (4)

=== 2016 Zone Premier League ===
Zone Premier League
- Season: 2016

The 2016 Zone Premier League season is the third edition of the Newcastle Zone Premier League as the third level domestic football competition in the district of Northern NSW. 10 teams will compete, all playing each other twice for a total of 18 rounds.

Pos	Team	Pld	W	D	L	GF	GA	GD	Pts	Qualification or relegation
1	Mayfield United	18	12	2	4	49	25	+24	38	2016 Zone Premier League Finals
2	Dudley Redhead	18	11	1	6	49	31	+18	34	2016 Zone Premier League Finals
3	Newcastle Uni FC	18	9	2	7	39	37	+2	29	2016 Zone Premier League Finals
4	Newcastle Suns (C)	18	8	5	5	38	36	+2	29	2016 Zone Premier League Finals
5	Cardiff City	18	9	2	7	33	31	+2	29	
6	Beresfield United	18	8	3	7	44	36	+8	27	
7	New Lambton Eagles (P)	18	7	4	7	30	36	−6	25	Promoted to the 2017 Northern NSW State League Division 1
8	Swansea FC	18	7	3	8	27	30	−3	24	
9	Morriset United	18	6	1	11	33	48	−15	19	
10	Garden Suburb (R)	18	0	3	15	13	45	−32	3	Relegation to 2017 Zone League 1

(C) Champions; (P) Promoted; (R) Relegated

==== Finals ====
Semi-finals
1
4
2
3

Grand Final

=== 2016 Zone League 1 ===
Zone League 1
- Season: 2016

The 2016 Zone League 1 season is the third edition of the Zone League 1 as the fourth level domestic football competition in the district of Northern NSW. 10 teams will compete, all playing each other twice for a total of 18 matches.

Pos	Team	Pld	W	D	L	GF	GA	GD	Pts	Qualification or relegation
1	Barnsley FC	0	0	0	0	0	0	0	0	Promotion to the 2017 Zone Premier League
2	Beresfield FC	0	0	0	0	0	0	0	0	2016 Zone League 1 Finals
3	Charlestown City Blues B	0	0	0	0	0	0	0	0	2016 Zone League 1 Finals
4	Cooks Hill United B	0	0	0	0	0	0	0	0	2016 Zone League 1 Finals
5	Jesmond FC	0	0	0	0	0	0	0	0	
6	Kotara South	0	0	0	0	0	0	0	0	
7	Nelson Bay	0	0	0	0	0	0	0	0	
8	Raymond Terrace	0	0	0	0	0	0	0	0	
9	Stockton Sharks	0	0	0	0	0	0	0	0	
10	Warners Bay	0	0	0	0	0	0	0	0	Relegation to 2017 Zone League 2

==== Finals ====
Semi-finals
1
4
2
3

Grand Final

=== 2016 Zone League 2 ===
Zone League 2
- Season: 2016

The 2016 Zone League 2 season is the third edition of the Zone League 2 as the fifth level domestic football competition in the district of Northern NSW. 10 teams will compete, all playing each other twice for a total of 18 matches.

Pos	Team	Pld	W	D	L	GF	GA	GD	Pts	Qualification or relegation
1	Hamilton Olympic B	0	0	0	0	0	0	0	0	Promotion to the 2017 Zone League 1
2	Hunter Simba	0	0	0	0	0	0	0	0	2016 Zone League 2 Finals
3	Kurri Kurri	0	0	0	0	0	0	0	0	2016 Zone League 2 Finals
4	Medowie FC	0	0	0	0	0	0	0	0	2016 Zone League 2 Finals
5	Merewether Advance	0	0	0	0	0	0	0	0	
6	Muswellbrook FC	0	0	0	0	0	0	0	0	
7	Newcastle University B	0	0	0	0	0	0	0	0	
8	Plattsburg Maryland	0	0	0	0	0	0	0	0	
9	Westlakes Wildcats	0	0	0	0	0	0	0	0	
10	Wallsend FC B	0	0	0	0	0	0	0	0	Relegation to 2017 Zone League 3

==== Finals ====
Semi-finals
1
4
2
3

Grand Final

=== 2016 Zone League 3 ===
Zone League 3
- Season: 2016

The 2016 Zone League 3 season is the third edition of the Zone League 3 as the sixth level domestic football competition in the district of Northern NSW. 10 teams will compete, all playing each other twice for a total of 18 matches.

Pos	Team	Pld	W	D	L	GF	GA	GD	Pts	Qualification or relegation
1	Abermain FC	0	0	0	0	0	0	0	0	Promotion to the 2017 Zone League 2
2	Dudley Redhead B	0	0	0	0	0	0	0	0	2016 Zone League 3 Finals
3	Edgeworth Eagles B	0	0	0	0	0	0	0	0	2016 Zone League 3 Finals
4	Jesmond FC B	0	0	0	0	0	0	0	0	2016 Zone League 3 Finals
5	Kahibah FC B	0	0	0	0	0	0	0	0	
6	Mayfield United B	0	0	0	0	0	0	0	0	
7	New Lambton B	0	0	0	0	0	0	0	0	
8	RAAF Williamtown	0	0	0	0	0	0	0	0	
9	Tenambit Sharks	0	0	0	0	0	0	0	0	
10	Valentine FC B	0	0	0	0	0	0	0	0	

==== Finals ====
Semi-finals
1
4
2
3

Grand Final

=== 2016 Women's Premier League ===
Herald Women's Premier League
- Season: 2016
- Champions: Warners Bay
- Premiers: Adamstown Rosebud

The highest tier domestic football competition in Northern NSW for women is known for sponsorship reasons as the Herald Women's Premier League. The 7 teams played a triple round-robin for a total of 18 games, followed by a finals series.

Pos	Team	Pld	W	D	L	GF	GA	GD	Pts	Qualification or relegation
1	Adamstown Rosebud	18	15	1	2	61	18	+43	46	2016 Finals series
2	Warners Bay (C)	18	12	2	4	61	27	+34	38	2016 Finals series
3	Merewether United	18	11	2	5	45	22	+23	35	2016 Finals series
4	Wallsend	18	9	3	6	54	31	+23	30	2016 Finals series
5	South Wallsend	18	6	2	10	31	42	−11	20	
6	Thornton Redbacks	18	4	0	14	18	67	−49	12	
7	Football Mid North Coast	18	0	2	16	12	75	−63	2	

Source: sportstg.com
Rules for classification: 1) points; 2) goal difference; 3) number of goals scored.
(C) Champions

Semi-finals
1	Adamstown Rosebud	2	1	3
4	Wallsend	3	1	4
2	Warners Bay	1	4	5
3	Merewether United	1	1	2

Grand Final
Warners Bay	1
Wallsend	0

== Cup Competitions ==
=== FFA Cup Preliminary rounds ===
Northern NSW soccer clubs competed in 2016 within the Northern NSW Preliminary rounds for the 2016 FFA Cup. In addition to the A-League club Newcastle Jets, the two Round 7 winners - Lambton Jaffas and Edgeworth FC - qualified for the final rounds of the FFA Cup, entering at the Round of 32. Edgeworth FC made it to the Round of 16, before being eliminated by A-League club Western Sydney Wanderers.
