= 2018 Northern NSW Football season =

Northern NSW Football
- Season: 2018

The 2018 Northern NSW Football season was the fifth season under the new competition format in northern New South Wales.

== League Tables ==
=== 2018 National Premier League Northern NSW ===
NPL Northern NSW
- Season: 2018
- Champions: Broadmeadow Magic
- Premiers: Edgeworth Eagles
- Relegated: -
- Top goalscorer: -

| Pos | Team | Pld | W | D | L | GF | GA | GD | Pts | Qualification or relegation |
|---|---|---|---|---|---|---|---|---|---|---|
| 1 | Edgeworth Eagles | 20 | 14 | 4 | 2 | 37 | 16 | +21 | 46 | 2018 National Premier Leagues Finals |
| 2 | Broadmeadow Magic (C) | 20 | 10 | 5 | 5 | 44 | 20 | +24 | 35 | 2018 Northern NSW Finals |
| 3 | Maitland | 20 | 9 | 7 | 4 | 38 | 21 | +17 | 34 | 2018 Northern NSW Finals |
| 4 | Lambton Jaffas | 20 | 9 | 7 | 4 | 35 | 21 | +14 | 34 | 2018 Northern NSW Finals |
| 5 | Hamilton Olympic | 20 | 10 | 3 | 7 | 41 | 31 | +10 | 33 | |
| 6 | Charlestown City Blues | 20 | 10 | 1 | 9 | 30 | 31 | −1 | 31 | |
| 7 | Newcastle Jets Youth | 20 | 7 | 3 | 10 | 32 | 45 | −13 | 24 | |
| 8 | Lake Macquarie City | 20 | 6 | 2 | 12 | 35 | 42 | −7 | 20 | |
| 9 | Weston Workers | 20 | 6 | 2 | 12 | 28 | 42 | −14 | 20 | |
| 10 | Adamstown Rosebud | 20 | 5 | 5 | 10 | 24 | 48 | −24 | 20 | |
| 11 | Valentine FC | 20 | 2 | 5 | 13 | 19 | 46 | −27 | 11 | |

Source: sportstg.com
Rules for classification: 1) points; 2) goal difference; 3) number of goals scored.
(C) Champions

==== Finals ====
Semi-finals
1 | Edgeworth Eagles (a.e.t.) | 1 | 3 | 4
4 | Lambton Jaffas | 1 | 2 | 3
2 | Broadmeadow Magic | 3 | 0 | 3
3 | Maitland | 1 | 1 | 2

Grand Final
1 | Edgeworth Eagles | 0
2 | Broadmeadow Magic | 3

=== 2018 NEWFM Northern League One ===
- Season: 2018
- Champions: Belmont Swansea United
- Premiers: Cooks Hill United
- Matches: -
- Top goalscorer: -
- Biggest home win: -
- Biggest away win: -
- Highest scoring: -

The NEWFM Northern League One (formerly Northern NSW State League Division 1) season was the fifth season of the new Northern NSW State League Division 1 as the second level domestic association football competition in the district of Northern NSW. The top team at the end of the year can be promoted to the 2019 National Premier Leagues Northern NSW, subject to meeting criteria.

| Pos | Team | Pld | W | D | L | GF | GA | GD | Pts | Qualification or relegation |
|---|---|---|---|---|---|---|---|---|---|---|
| 1 | Cooks Hill United | 20 | 16 | 2 | 2 | 76 | 23 | +53 | 50 | 2018 Northern NSW State League Division 1 Finals |
| 2 | Thornton Redbacks | 20 | 9 | 7 | 4 | 46 | 29 | +17 | 34 | 2018 Northern NSW State League Division 1 Finals |
| 3 | West Wallsend | 20 | 11 | 1 | 8 | 45 | 36 | +9 | 34 | 2018 Northern NSW State League Division 1 Finals |
| 4 | Belmont Swansea United (C) | 20 | 9 | 6 | 5 | 32 | 22 | +10 | 33 | 2018 Northern NSW State League Division 1 Finals |
| 5 | South Cardiff | 20 | 8 | 5 | 7 | 43 | 33 | +10 | 29 | |
| 6 | Wallsend | 20 | 8 | 4 | 8 | 49 | 48 | +1 | 28 | |
| 7 | Singleton Strikers | 20 | 6 | 9 | 5 | 28 | 29 | −1 | 27 | |
| 8 | Cessnock City Hornets | 20 | 7 | 5 | 8 | 33 | 34 | −1 | 26 | |
| 9 | New Lambton | 20 | 6 | 4 | 10 | 36 | 55 | −19 | 22 | |
| 10 | Kahibah | 20 | 3 | 5 | 12 | 34 | 45 | −11 | 14 | |
| 11 | Toronto Awaba | 20 | 2 | 2 | 16 | 27 | 95 | −68 | 8 | |

Source: sportstg.com
Rules for classification: 1) points; 2) goal difference; 3) number of goals scored.
(C) Champions

==== Finals ====
Semi-finals
1 | Cooks Hill United | 1 | 0 | 1
4 | Belmont Swansea United | 1 | 3 | 4
2 | Thornton Redbacks | 1 | 1 | 2
3 | West Wallsend | 1 | 2 | 3

Grand Final
4 | Belmont Swansea United | 4
3 | West Wallsend | 2

=== 2018 Zone Premier League ===
Zone Premier League
- Season: 2018
- Champions: Newcastle Suns
- Premiers: Mayfield United
- Relegated: = Jesmond FC

The 2018 Zone Premier League season was the fifth edition of the Newcastle Zone Premier League as the third level domestic football competition in the district of Northern NSW.

| Pos | Team | Pld | W | D | L | GF | GA | GD | Pts | Qualification or relegation |
|---|---|---|---|---|---|---|---|---|---|---|
| 1 | Mayfield United | 18 | 13 | 5 | 0 | 55 | 19 | +36 | 44 | 2018 Zone Premier League Finals |
| 2 | Newcastle Suns (C) | 18 | 13 | 1 | 4 | 53 | 32 | +21 | 40 | 2018 Zone Premier League Finals |
| 3 | Dudley Redhead | 18 | 12 | 3 | 3 | 42 | 21 | +21 | 39 | 2018 Zone Premier League Finals |
| 4 | Kotara South | 18 | 9 | 4 | 5 | 46 | 23 | +23 | 31 | 2018 Zone Premier League Finals |
| 5 | Swansea FC | 18 | 8 | 4 | 6 | 30 | 32 | −2 | 28 | |
| 6 | Warners Bay | 18 | 7 | 0 | 11 | 31 | 40 | −9 | 21 | |
| 7 | Cardiff City | 18 | 6 | 2 | 10 | 29 | 41 | −12 | 20 | |
| 8 | Beresfield | 18 | 3 | 3 | 12 | 27 | 58 | −31 | 12 | |
| 9 | Barnsley USC | 18 | 3 | 2 | 13 | 29 | 52 | −23 | 11 | |
| 10 | Jesmond FC | 18 | 3 | 2 | 13 | 25 | 49 | −24 | 11 | Relegation to 2019 Zone League 1 |

Source: sportstg.com
(C) Champions

==== Finals ====
Semi-finals
1 | Mayfield United | 0 | 1 | 1
4 | Kotara South | 2 | 1 | 3
2 | Newcastle Suns | 2 | 1 | 3
3 | Dudley Redhead | 1 | 1 | 2

Grand Final
4 | Kotara South | 2
2 | Newcastle Suns | 4

=== 2018 Zone League 1 ===
Zone League 1
- Season: 2018
- Champions: Raymond Terrace
- Premiers: Raymond Terrace
- Promoted: Raymond Terrace

The 2018 Zone League 1 season was the fifth edition of the Zone League 1 as the fourth level domestic football competition in the district of Northern NSW.

| Pos | Team | Pld | W | D | L | GF | GA | GD | Pts | Qualification or relegation |
|---|---|---|---|---|---|---|---|---|---|---|
| 1 | Raymond Terrace (C) | 18 | 14 | 1 | 3 | 64 | 13 | +51 | 43 | Promotion to the 2019 Zone Premier League |
| 2 | Cooks Hill United B | 18 | 13 | 2 | 3 | 49 | 22 | +27 | 41 | 2018 Zone League 1 Finals |
| 3 | Hamilton Azzurri | 18 | 12 | 3 | 3 | 44 | 24 | +20 | 39 | 2018 Zone League 1 Finals |
| 4 | Westlakes Wildcats | 18 | 10 | 3 | 5 | 44 | 28 | +16 | 33 | 2018 Zone League 1 Finals |
| 5 | Stockton Sharks | 18 | 9 | 2 | 7 | 44 | 36 | +8 | 29 | |
| 6 | Maryland Fletcher | 18 | 9 | 1 | 8 | 30 | 30 | 0 | 28 | |
| 7 | Garden Suburb | 18 | 5 | 0 | 13 | 30 | 34 | −4 | 15 | |
| 8 | Wallsend B | 18 | 3 | 5 | 10 | 32 | 63 | −31 | 14 | |
| 9 | Newcastle Uni FC | 18 | 3 | 2 | 13 | 25 | 57 | −32 | 11 | |
| 10 | Morisset United | 18 | 2 | 1 | 15 | 15 | 70 | −55 | 7 | Relegation to 2019 Zone League 2 |

Source: sportstg.com
(C) Champions

==== Finals ====
Semi-finals
1 | Raymond Terrace | 1 | 2 | 3
4 | Westlakes Wildcats | 1 | 0 | 1
2 | Cooks Hill United B | 1 | 3 | 4
3 | Hamilton Azzurri | 1 | 2 | 3

Grand Final
1 | Raymond Terrace | 1
2 | Cooks Hill United B | 0

=== 2018 Zone League 2 ===
Zone League 2
- Season: 2018
- Champions: Hunter Simba
- Premiers: New Lambton
- Promoted: New Lambton

The 2018 Zone League 2 season was the fifth edition of the Zone League 2 as the fifth level domestic football competition in the district of Northern NSW.

| Pos | Team | Pld | W | D | L | GF | GA | GD | Pts | Qualification or relegation |
|---|---|---|---|---|---|---|---|---|---|---|
| 1 | New Lambton B | 18 | 11 | 4 | 3 | 42 | 26 | +16 | 37 | Promotion to the 2019 Zone League 1 |
| 2 | Merewether Advance | 18 | 8 | 5 | 5 | 50 | 31 | +19 | 29 | 2018 Zone League 2 Finals |
| 3 | Kahibah FC B | 18 | 6 | 9 | 3 | 36 | 29 | +7 | 27 | 2018 Zone League 2 Finals |
| 4 | Hunter Simba (C) | 18 | 8 | 3 | 7 | 63 | 57 | +6 | 27 | 2018 Zone League 2 Finals |
| 5 | Hamilton Olympic B | 18 | 8 | 2 | 8 | 49 | 49 | 0 | 26 | |
| 6 | Nelson Bay | 18 | 5 | 4 | 9 | 36 | 47 | −11 | 19 | |
| 7 | Charlestown City Blues B | 18 | 3 | 1 | 14 | 23 | 60 | −37 | 10 | Relegation to 2019 Zone League 3 |

Source: sportstg.com
(C) Champions

==== Finals ====
Semi-finals
1 | New Lambton B | 2 | 1 | 3
4 | Hunter Simba | 2 | 2 | 4
2 | Merewether Advance | 3 | 3 | 6
3 | Kahibah FC B | 3 | 2 | 5

Grand Final
4 | Hunter Simba | 4
2 | Merewether Advance | 1

=== 2018 Zone League 3 ===
Zone League 3
- Season: 2018
- Champions: Hamilton Azzurri
- Premiers: Hamilton Azzurri
- Promoted: Hamilton Azzurri

The 2018 Zone League 3 season was the fifth edition of the Zone League 3 as the sixth level domestic football competition in the district of Northern NSW.

| Pos | Team | Pld | W | D | L | GF | GA | GD | Pts | Qualification or relegation |
|---|---|---|---|---|---|---|---|---|---|---|
| 1 | Bolwarra Lorn (C) | 20 | 16 | 1 | 3 | 57 | 20 | +37 | 49 | Promotion to the 2019 Zone League 2 |
| 2 | Maitland B | 20 | 11 | 2 | 7 | 42 | 37 | +5 | 35 | 2018 Zone League 3 Finals |
| 3 | West Wallsend B | 20 | 9 | 3 | 8 | 30 | 29 | +1 | 30 | 2018 Zone League 3 Finals |
| 4 | Medowie FC | 20 | 9 | 2 | 9 | 47 | 0 | +47 | 29 | 2018 Zone League 3 Finals |
| 5 | Maitland Junior | 20 | 6 | 0 | 14 | 30 | 54 | −24 | 18 | |
| 6 | Dudley Redhead B | 20 | 4 | 2 | 14 | 24 | 49 | −25 | 14 | |

Source: sportstg.com
(C) Champions

==== Finals ====
Semi-finals
1 | Bolwarra Lorn | 2 | 2 | 4
4 | Medowie FC | 0 | 0 | 0
2 | Maitland B | 2 | 1 | 3
3 | West Wallsend B | 1 | 1 | 2

Grand Final
1 | Bolwarra Lorn | 3
2 | Maitland B | 2

=== 2018 Women's Premier League ===
Herald Women's Premier League
- Season: 2018
- Champions: Merewether United FC
- Premiers: Warners Bay FC
- Matches: 90
- Goals: 219 (2.43 per match)
- Top goalscorer: Jenna Kingsley (27 goals)
- Biggest home win: Warners Bay 8 def. South Wallsend 1
- Highest scoring: South Wallsend 6 def. New Lambton 5

The highest tier domestic football competition in Northern NSW for women is known for sponsorship reasons as the Herald Women's Premier League.

| Pos | Team | Pld | W | D | L | GF | GA | GD | Pts | Qualification or relegation |
|---|---|---|---|---|---|---|---|---|---|---|
| 1 | Medowie FC | 12 | 9 | 1 | 2 | 41 | 0 | +41 | 28 | 2018 Finals series |
| 2 | Mayfield United (C) | 12 | 9 | 1 | 2 | 18 | 3 | +15 | 28 | 2018 Finals series |
| 3 | Cooks Hill United | 12 | 5 | 3 | 4 | 20 | 24 | −4 | 18 | 2018 Finals series |
| 4 | Kotara South | 12 | 4 | 3 | 5 | 13 | 16 | −3 | 15 | 2018 Finals series |
| 5 | Tilligerry FC | 12 | 3 | 3 | 6 | 14 | 29 | −15 | 12 | |
| 6 | Newcastle Uni FC | 12 | 2 | 4 | 6 | 15 | 31 | −16 | 10 | |
| 7 | Greta Branxton FC | 12 | 1 | 3 | 8 | 18 | 27 | −9 | 6 | |

Source: sportstg.com
Rules for classification: 1) points; 2) goal difference; 3) number of goals scored.
(C) Champions

Semi-finals
1 | Medowie FC | 1
2 | Mayfield United | 3
3 | Cooks Hill United | 5
4 | Kotara South | 6

Preliminary Final
1 | Medowie FC | 3
4 | Kotara South | 1

Grand Final
2 | Mayfield United | 4
1 | Medowie FC | 3

== Cup Competitions ==
=== FFA Cup Preliminary rounds ===
Northern NSW soccer clubs competed in 2018 within the Northern NSW Preliminary rounds for the 2018 FFA Cup. In addition to the A-League club Newcastle Jets, the two Round 7 winners - Broadmeadow Magic and Charlestown City Blues - qualified for the final rounds of the FFA Cup, entering at the Round of 32. Broadmeadow Magic reached the Round of 16.
