= 2017 Northern NSW Football season =

Northern NSW Football
- Season: 2017

The 2017 Northern NSW Football season was the fourth season under the new competition format in northern New South Wales.

== League tables ==
=== 2017 National Premier League Northern NSW ===
NPL Northern NSW
- Season: 2017
- Champions: Lambton Jaffas
- Premiers: Edgeworth Eagles
- Relegated: -
- Top goalscorer: -

Pos	Team	Pld	W	D	L	GF	GA	GD	Pts	Qualification or relegation
1	Edgeworth Eagles	20	13	4	3	42	14	+28	43	2017 National Premier Leagues Finals
2	Hamilton Olympic	20	12	4	4	39	20	+19	40	2017 Northern NSW Finals
3	Lambton Jaffas (C)	20	12	3	5	49	29	+20	39	2017 Northern NSW Finals
4	Broadmeadow Magic	20	12	3	5	39	27	+12	39	2017 Northern NSW Finals
5	Valentine FC	20	11	2	7	35	32	+3	35	
6	Maitland	20	9	4	7	40	30	+10	31	
7	Lake Macquarie City	20	6	5	9	27	39	−12	23	
8	Charlestown City Blues	20	5	4	11	25	33	−8	19	
9	Adamstown Rosebud	20	5	4	11	27	48	−21	19	
10	Newcastle Jets Youth	20	4	3	13	32	55	−23	15	
11	Weston Workers	20	1	4	15	18	46	−28	7	

Source: sportstg.com
Rules for classification: 1) points; 2) goal difference; 3) number of goals scored.
(C) Champions

==== Finals ====
Semi-finals
1	Edgeworth Eagles (pen.)	1	1	2 (3)
4	Broadmeadow Magic	0	2	2 (1)
2	Hamilton Olympic	1	1	2
3	Lambton Jaffas	2	2	4

Grand Final
1	Edgeworth Eagles	0
3	Lambton Jaffas (a.e.t.)	2

=== 2017 NEWFM Northern League One ===
- Season: 2017
- Champions: Cooks Hill United
- Premiers: Cooks Hill United
- Matches: -
- Top goalscorer: -
- Biggest home win: -
- Biggest away win: -
- Highest scoring: -

The NEWFM Northern League One (formerly Northern NSW State League Division 1) season was the fourth season of the new Northern NSW State League Division 1 as the second level domestic association football competition in the district of Northern NSW. The top team at the end of the year can be promoted to the 2017 National Premier Leagues Northern NSW, subject to meeting criteria.

Pos	Team	Pld	W	D	L	GF	GA	GD	Pts	Qualification or relegation
1	Cooks Hill United (C)	20	13	4	3	66	36	+30	43	2017 Northern NSW State League Division 1 Finals
2	Kahibah	20	13	2	5	49	18	+31	41	2017 Northern NSW State League Division 1 Finals
3	Belmont Swansea United	20	13	2	5	45	28	+17	41	2017 Northern NSW State League Division 1 Finals
4	Thornton Redbacks	20	12	3	5	51	22	+29	39	2017 Northern NSW State League Division 1 Finals
5	South Cardiff	20	11	2	7	36	25	+11	35	
6	West Wallsend	20	9	2	9	39	44	−5	29	
7	Wallsend	20	8	1	11	30	49	−19	25	
8	New Lambton	20	6	4	10	48	45	+3	22	
9	Singleton Strikers	20	6	1	13	28	49	−21	19	
10	Toronto Awaba	20	5	3	12	29	57	−28	18	
11	Cessnock City Hornets	20	0	4	16	17	65	−48	4	

Source: sportstg.com
Rules for classification: 1) points; 2) goal difference; 3) number of goals scored.
(C) Champions

==== Finals ====
Semi-finals
1	Cooks Hill United	3	7	10
4	Thornton Redbacks	0	1	1
2	Kahibah FC	2	0	2
3	Belmont Swansea United	0	3	3

Grand Final
1	Cooks Hill United	4
3	Belmont Swansea United	0

=== 2017 Zone Premier League ===
Zone Premier League
- Season: 2017
- Champions: Beresfield
- Premiers: Newcastle Suns
- Relegated: Newcastle Uni FC

The 2017 Zone Premier League season was the fourth edition of the Newcastle Zone Premier League as the third level domestic football competition in the district of Northern NSW.

Pos	Team	Pld	W	D	L	GF	GA	GD	Pts	Qualification or relegation
1	Newcastle Suns	18	14	1	3	80	24	+56	43	2017 Zone Premier League Finals
2	Beresfield	18	9	5	4	50	28	+22	32	2017 Zone Premier League Finals
3	Swansea FC	18	9	4	5	30	21	+9	31	2017 Zone Premier League Finals
4	Dudley Redhead	18	8	5	5	26	18	+8	29	2017 Zone Premier League Finals
5	Kotara South	18	8	2	8	30	31	−1	26	
6	Mayfield United	18	7	2	9	28	32	−4	23	
7	Jesmond	18	7	2	9	31	47	−16	23	
8	Cardiff City	18	6	4	8	36	39	−3	22	
9	Warners Bay	18	4	3	11	24	59	−35	15	
10	Newcastle Uni FC	18	3	2	13	27	63	−36	11	Relegation to 2017 Zone League 1

Source: sportstg.com

==== Finals ====
Semi-finals
1	Newcastle Suns (a)	2	0	2
4	Dudley Redhead	1	1	2
2	Beresfield	2	3	5
3	Swansea FC	2	2	4

Grand Final
1	Newcastle Suns	2
2	Beresfield	3

=== 2017 Zone League 1 ===
Zone League 1
- Season: 2017
- Champions: Raymond Terrace
- Premiers: Barnsley USC
- Promoted: Barnsley USC

The 2017 Zone League 1 season was the fourth edition of the Zone League 1 as the fourth level domestic football competition in the district of Northern NSW.

Pos	Team	Pld	W	D	L	GF	GA	GD	Pts	Qualification or relegation
1	Barnsley USC	18	11	5	2	48	20	+28	38	Promotion to the 2018 Zone Premier League
2	Raymond Terrace	18	10	5	3	31	19	+12	35	2017 Zone League 1 Finals
3	Garden Suburb	18	10	3	5	53	33	+20	33	2017 Zone League 1 Finals
4	Wallsend B	18	10	2	6	39	32	+7	32	2017 Zone League 1 Finals
5	Stockton Sharks	18	9	4	5	36	30	+6	31	
6	Beresfield FC	18	6	3	9	40	53	−13	21	
7	Westlakes Wildcats	18	5	4	9	20	33	−13	19	
8	Cooks Hill United B	18	5	3	10	33	33	0	18	
9	Morisset United	18	4	6	8	21	28	−7	18	
10	Charlestown City Blues B	18	1	3	14	11	51	−40	6	Relegation to 2018 Zone League 2

Source: sportstg.com

==== Finals ====
Semi-finals
1	Barnsley USC	4	5	9
4	Wallsend B	3	2	5
2	Raymond Terrace	0	1	1
3	Garden Suburb	0	0	0

Grand Final
1	Barnsley USC	5
2	Raymond Terrace	6

=== 2017 Zone League 2 ===
Zone League 2
- Season: 2017
- Champions: Hunter Simba
- Premiers: Argenton United
- Promoted: Argenton United

The 2017 Zone League 2 season was the fourth edition of the Zone League 2 as the fifth level domestic football competition in the district of Northern NSW.

Pos	Team	Pld	W	D	L	GF	GA	GD	Pts	Qualification or relegation
1	Argenton United	18	14	2	2	87	22	+65	44	Promotion to the 2018 Zone League 1
2	Hunter Simba (C)	18	12	2	4	64	34	+30	38	2017 Zone League 2 Finals
3	New Lambton B	18	10	4	4	41	20	+21	34	2017 Zone League 2 Finals
4	Maryland Fletcher	18	10	3	5	50	25	+25	33	2017 Zone League 2 Finals
5	Kahibah FC B	18	9	3	6	45	39	+6	30	
6	Hamilton Olympic B	18	9	1	8	44	37	+7	28	
7	Merewether Advance	18	8	2	8	52	39	+13	26	
8	Nelson Bay	18	5	0	13	26	57	−31	15	
9	Muswellbrook FC	18	3	1	14	31	55	−24	10	
10	Newcastle University B	18	1	0	17	15	127	−112	3	Relegation to 2018 Zone League 3

Source: sportstg.com
(C) Champions

==== Finals ====
Semi-finals
1	Argenton United	1	2	3
4	Maryland Fletcher	1	1	2
2	Hunter Simba	2	6	8
3	New Lambton B	1	5	6

Grand Final
1	Argenton United	0
2	Hunter Simba	1

=== 2017 Zone League 3 ===
Zone League 3
- Season: 2017
- Champions: Hamilton Azzurri
- Premiers: Hamilton Azzurri
- Promoted: Hamilton Azzurri

The 2017 Zone League 3 season was the fourth edition of the Zone League 3 as the sixth level domestic football competition in the district of Northern NSW.

Pos	Team	Pld	W	D	L	GF	GA	GD	Pts	Qualification or relegation
1	Hamilton Azzurri (C)	21	20	1	0	101	23	+78	61	Promotion to the 2018 Zone League 2
2	Maitland B	21	14	0	7	76	41	+35	42	2017 Zone League 3 Finals
3	Bolwarra Lorn	21	13	2	6	57	30	+27	41	2017 Zone League 3 Finals
4	Dudley Redhead B	21	12	1	8	54	47	+7	37	2017 Zone League 3 Finals
5	Medowie FC	21	9	2	10	56	0	+56	29	
6	Edgeworth Eagles B	21	9	0	12	48	54	−6	27	
7	Maitland Junior	21	3	0	18	27	78	−51	9	
8	Mayfield United B	21	1	0	20	14	89	−75	3	

Source: sportstg.com
(C) Champions

==== Finals ====
Semi-finals
1	Hamilton Azzurri (a)	1	1	2
4	Dudley Redhead B	2	0	2
2	Maitland B	0	4	4
3	Bolwarra Lorn	3	2	5

Grand Final
1	Hamilton Azzurri	2
3	Bolwarra Lorn	1

=== 2017 Women's Premier League ===
Herald Women's Premier League
- Season: 2017
- Champions: Merewether United
- Premiers: Warners Bay

The highest tier domestic football competition in Northern NSW for women is known for sponsorship reasons as the Herald Women's Premier League.

Pos	Team	Pld	W	D	L	GF	GA	GD	Pts	Qualification or relegation
1	Warners Bay	18	15	1	2	71	21	+50	46	2017 Finals series
2	Merewether United (C)	18	15	0	3	67	19	+48	45	2017 Finals series
3	Adamstown Rosebud	18	10	2	6	50	41	+9	32	2017 Finals series
4	Football Mid North Coast	18	6	2	10	40	48	−8	20	2017 Finals series
5	South Wallsend	17	5	4	8	29	41	−12	19	
6	Wallsend	17	2	5	10	32	46	−14	11	
7	Thornton Redbacks	18	2	0	16	6	79	−73	6	

Source: sportstg.com
Rules for classification: 1) points; 2) goal difference; 3) number of goals scored.
(C) Champions

Semi-finals
1	Warners Bay	4	3	7
4	Football Mid North Coast	2	0	2
2	Merewether United	2	4	6
3	Adamstown Rosebud	1	0	1

Grand Final
Warners Bay	3
Merewether United	4

== Cup Competitions ==
=== FFA Cup Preliminary rounds ===
Northern NSW soccer clubs competed in 2017 within the Northern NSW Preliminary rounds for the 2017 FFA Cup. In addition to the A-League club Newcastle Jets, the two Round 7 winners - Broadmeadow Magic and Edgeworth FC - qualified for the final rounds of the FFA Cup, entering at the Round of 32, where they were both eliminated.
