= 2015 Northern NSW Football season =

Northern NSW Football
- Season: 2015
- Champions: Edgeworth Eagles

The 2015 Northern NSW Football season was the second season under the new competition format in northern New South Wales. The competition consisted of six divisions across the district. The overall premier for the new structure qualified for the National Premier Leagues finals series, competing with the other state federation champions in a final knockout tournament to decide the National Premier Leagues Champion for 2015.

== League Tables ==
=== 2015 National Premier League Northern NSW ===
NPL Northern NSW
- Season: 2015
- Champions: Edgeworth Eagles
- Premiers: Edgeworth Eagles
- Relegated: South Cardiff
- Top goalscorer: Kale Bradbery (Broadmeadow Magic) (16)
- Biggest home win: Edgeworth 4–0 Charlestown
- Biggest away win: Newcastle Jets Youth 0–7 Hamilton Olympic
- Highest scoring: Newcastle Jets Youth 4–4 Edgeworth

The 2015 National Premier League Northern NSW season was played over 18 rounds. The bottom team was relegated to the 2016 Northern NSW State League Division 1. Promoted for 2015 are Maitland FC, who were previously in the top tier of Northern NSW football in 2002. In a change for 2015, the top four teams in the league will contest the semi-finals, which will be conducted over two legs.

Pos	Team	Pld	W	D	L	GF	GA	GD	Pts	Qualification or relegation
1	Edgeworth Eagles (C)	18	13	1	4	39	22	+17	40	2015 National Premier Leagues Finals
2	Lambton Jaffas	18	11	4	3	42	22	+20	37	2015 Northern NSW Finals
3	Hamilton Olympic	18	10	6	2	46	22	+24	36	2015 Northern NSW Finals
4	Broadmeadow Magic	18	10	2	6	43	26	+17	32	2015 Northern NSW Finals
5	Weston Workers	18	9	2	7	24	26	−2	29	
6	Adamstown Rosebud	18	8	4	6	29	30	−1	28	
7	Newcastle Jets Youth	18	5	2	11	34	46	−12	17	
8	Maitland	18	4	3	11	21	33	−12	15	
9	Charlestown City Blues	18	4	1	13	18	43	−25	13	
10	South Cardiff (R)	18	2	3	13	22	48	−26	9	Relegated to the 2016 NNSW State League 1

Source: foxsportspulse.com
Rules for classification: 1) points; 2) goal difference; 3) number of goals scored.
(C) Champions; (R) Relegated

==== Finals ====
Semi-finals
1	Edgeworth (a)	3	0	3
4	Broadmeadow Magic	3	0	3
2	Lambton Jaffas	1	2	3
3	Hamilton Olympic	2	2	4

Grand Final
1	Edgeworth	2
3	Hamilton Olympic	0

==== Top Scorers ====
Rank	Player	Club	Goals
1	(Australia) Kale Bradbery	Broadmeadow Magic	16
2	(Australia) Peter Haynes	Broadmeadow Magic	12
3	(Australia) Dino Fajkovic	Broadmeadow Magic	11
3	(Australia) Kane Goodchild	Hamilton Olympic	11
5	(Australia) John Majurovski	Lambton Jaffas	10
6	(Australia) Simon Mooney	Hamilton Olympic	9

=== 2015 Northern NSW State League Division 1 ===
Northern NSW State League Division 1
- Season: 2015
- Champions: Wallsend
- Promoted: Valentine
- Top goalscorer: Sam Walker (Lake Macquarie City) (38)
- Biggest home win: Lake Macquarie City 8–1 West Wallsend
- Biggest away win: West Wallsend 0–6 Valentine
- Highest scoring: Lake Macquarie City 9–4 Wallsend

The 2015 Northern NSW State League Division 1 season is the second season of the new Northern NSW State League Division 1 as the second level domestic association football competition in the district of Northern NSW. 11 teams will compete, all playing each other twice, for a total of 20 rounds. The top team at the end of the year is promoted to the 2016 National Premier Leagues Northern NSW, subject to meeting criteria.

Pos	Team	Pld	W	D	L	GF	GA	GD	Pts	Qualification or relegation
1	Valentine FC (P)	20	16	2	2	61	19	+42	50	Promotion to the 2016 National Premier League Northern NSW
2	Lake Macquarie City	20	13	3	4	71	40	+31	42	2015 Northern NSW State League Division 1 Finals
3	Wallsend (C)	20	14	0	6	47	33	+14	42	2015 Northern NSW State League Division 1 Finals
4	Kahibah	20	9	6	5	35	26	+9	33	2015 Northern NSW State League Division 1 Finals
5	Singleton Strikers	20	10	2	8	45	33	+12	32	
6	Belmont Swansea	20	9	4	7	34	27	+7	31	
7	Cooks Hill United	20	7	2	11	34	39	−5	23	
8	Thornton Redbacks	20	6	2	12	26	45	−19	20	
9	Toronto Awaba	20	5	0	15	25	59	−34	15	
10	Cessnock City	20	3	5	12	25	47	−22	14	
11	West Wallsend	20	4	2	14	28	63	−35	14	

Source: Fox Sports Pulse – NEWFM 1ST DIVISION – 1ST GRADE
Rules for classification: 1) points; 2) goal difference; 3) number of goals scored.
(C) Champions; (P) Promoted

==== Finals ====
Semi-finals
1	Valentine	1	3	4
4	Kahibah	0	1	1
2	Lake Macquarie City	3	1	4
3	Wallsend	1	6	7

Grand Final
1	Valentine	0
3	Wallsend	1

=== 2015 Zone Premier League ===
Zone Premier League
- Season: 2015
- Champions: Beresfield
- Premiers: Beresfield
- Relegated: Barnsley
- Biggest home win: Newcastle Uni FC 11–1 Garden Suburb
- Biggest away win: Cardiff City 0–8 Barnsley
- Highest scoring: Newcastle Uni FC 11–1 Garden Suburb; Newcastle Suns 9–3 Garden Suburb

The 2015 Zone Premier League season is the second edition of the Newcastle Zone Premier League as the third level domestic football competition in the district of Northern NSW. 10 teams will compete, all playing each other twice for a total of 18 rounds.

Pos	Team	Pld	W	D	L	GF	GA	GD	Pts	Qualification or relegation
1	Beresfield United (C)	18	14	3	1	65	25	+40	45	2015 Zone Premier League Finals
2	Newcastle Suns	18	10	1	7	49	39	+10	31	2015 Zone Premier League Finals
3	Swansea FC	18	9	4	5	41	32	+9	31	2015 Zone Premier League Finals
4	Cardiff City FC	18	8	5	5	41	27	+14	29	2015 Zone Premier League Finals
5	New Lambton Eagles	18	8	3	7	38	36	+2	27	
6	Newcastle Uni FC	18	7	4	7	47	34	+13	25	
7	Mayfield United	18	8	1	9	33	41	−8	25	
8	Dudley Redhead	18	7	3	8	41	39	+2	24	
9	Garden Suburb	18	3	6	9	33	60	−27	15	
10	Barnsley FC (R)	18	0	2	16	15	70	−55	2	Relegation to 2016 Zone League 1

Source: Fox Sports Pulse – Z F LEAGUE PREMIER 1ST GRADE
Rules for classification: 1) points; 2) goal difference; 3) number of goals scored.
(C) Champions; (R) Relegated

==== Finals ====
Semi-finals
1	Beresfield	0	3	3
4	Cardiff City	0	1	1
2	Newcastle Suns	1	2	3
3	Swansea	0	4	4

Grand Final
1	Beresfield	0 (4)
3	Swansea	0 (3)

=== 2015 Zone League 1 ===
Zone League 1
- Season: 2015
- Champions: Warners Bay
- Premiers: Morriset
- Relegated: Westlakes

The 2015 Zone League 1 season is the second edition of the Zone League 1 as the fourth level domestic football competition in the district of Northern NSW. 10 teams will compete, all playing each other twice for a total of 18 matches.

Pos	Team	Pld	W	D	L	GF	GA	GD	Pts	Qualification or relegation
1	Morriset United (P)	18	13	3	2	66	25	+41	42	Promotion to the 2016 Zone Premier League
2	Cooks Hill United B	18	10	5	3	45	25	+20	35	2015 Zone League 1 Finals
3	Warners Bay (C)	18	11	2	5	43	31	+12	35	2015 Zone League 1 Finals
4	Stockton Sharks	18	9	5	4	40	28	+12	32	2015 Zone League 1 Finals
5	Kotara South	18	8	2	8	43	52	−9	26	
6	Charlestown City Blues B	18	6	5	7	41	39	+2	23	
7	Jesmond FC	18	7	2	9	31	31	0	23	
8	Beresfield FC	18	5	7	6	40	39	+1	22	
9	Nelson Bay	18	3	1	14	32	57	−25	10	
10	Westlakes Wildcats (R)	18	1	2	15	18	72	−54	5	Relegation to 2016 Zone League 2

Source: Fox Sports Pulse – Z F LEAGUE ONE 1ST GRADE
Rules for classification: 1) points; 2) goal difference; 3) number of goals scored.
(C) Champions; (P) Promoted; (R) Relegated

==== Finals ====
Semi-finals
1	Morisset	2	3	5
4	Stockton	1	0	1
2	Cooks Hill	1	0	1
3	Warners Bay	3	1	4

Grand Final
1	Morisset	5
3	Warners Bay	6

=== 2015 Zone League 2 ===
Zone League 2
- Season: 2015
- Champions: Raymond Terrace
- Premiers: Raymond Terrace
- Relegated: Tenambit

The 2015 Zone League 2 season is the second edition of the Zone League 2 as the fifth level domestic football competition in the district of Northern NSW. 10 teams will compete, all playing each other twice for a total of 18 matches.

Pos	Team	Pld	W	D	L	GF	GA	GD	Pts	Qualification or relegation
1	Raymond Terrace (P, C)	18	17	1	0	88	14	+74	52	Promotion to the 2016 Zone League 1
2	Newcastle Uni B	18	13	2	3	52	23	+29	41	2015 Zone League 2 Finals
3	Hamilton Olympic B	18	13	0	5	58	23	+35	39	2015 Zone League 2 Finals
4	Hunter Simba	18	8	4	6	44	34	+10	28	2015 Zone League 2 Finals
5	Kurri Kurri	18	4	6	8	35	53	−18	18	
6	Medowie FC	18	6	0	12	31	61	−30	18	
7	Merewether Advance	18	5	3	10	28	61	−33	18	
8	Maryland Fletcher	18	4	4	10	34	41	−7	16	
9	Muswellbrook FC	18	3	4	11	26	52	−26	13	
10	Tenambit Sharks (R)	18	3	4	11	22	56	−34	13	Relegation to 2016 Zone League 3

Source: Fox Sports Pulse – Z F LEAGUE TWO 1ST GRADE
Rules for classification: 1) points; 2) goal difference; 3) number of goals scored.
(C) Champions; (P) Promoted; (R) Relegated

==== Finals ====
Semi-finals
1	Raymond Terrace	5	7	12
4	Hunter Simba	3	0	3
2	University of Newcastle	4	4	8
3	Hamilton	2	2	4

Grand Final
1	Raymond Terrace	3
2	University of Newcastle	2

=== 2015 Zone League 3 ===
Zone League 3
- Season: 2015
- Champions: New Lambton
- Premiers: Wallsend

The 2015 Zone League 3 season is the second edition of the Zone League 3 as the sixth level domestic football competition in the district of Northern NSW. 10 teams will compete, all playing each other twice for a total of 18 matches.

Pos	Team	Pld	W	D	L	GF	GA	GD	Pts	Qualification or relegation
1	Wallsend FC B (P)	16	13	2	1	75	26	+49	41	Promotion to the 2016 Zone League 2
2	Dudley Redhead B	16	12	1	3	50	26	+24	37	2015 Zone League 3 Finals
3	New Lambton B (C)	16	11	3	2	53	14	+39	36	2015 Zone League 3 Finals
4	RAAF Williamtown	16	9	1	6	57	43	+14	28	2015 Zone League 3 Finals
5	Kahibah FC B	16	7	3	6	46	27	+19	24	
6	Edgeworth Eagles B	16	3	3	10	25	41	−16	12	
7	Abermain FC	16	3	3	10	17	47	−30	12	
8	Mayfield United B	16	2	5	9	22	55	−33	11	
9	Jesmond FC B	16	1	1	14	18	84	−66	4	

Source: Fox Sports Pulse – Z F LEAGUE THREE 1ST GRADE
Rules for classification: 1) points; 2) goal difference; 3) number of goals scored.
(C) Champions; (P) Promoted

==== Finals ====
Semi-finals
1	Wallsend	3	1	4
4	RAAF Williamtown	1	7	8
2	Dudley Redhead	0	5	5
3	New Lambton	4	6	10

Grand Final
3	New Lambton	2
4	RAAF Williamtown	0

=== 2015 Women's Premier League ===
Herald Women's Premier League
- Season: 2015
- Champions: Merewether United
- Premiers: Merewether United

The highest tier domestic football competition in Northern NSW for women was known for sponsorship reasons as the Herald Women's Premier League. The 8 teams played a triple round-robin for a total of 18 games, followed by a finals series.

Pos	Team	Pld	W	D	L	GF	GA	GD	Pts	Qualification or relegation
1	Merewether United (C)	21	16	4	1	57	19	+38	52	2016 Finals series
2	Adamstown Rosebud	21	14	3	4	65	19	+46	45	2016 Finals series
3	Valentine FC	21	13	2	6	70	48	+22	41	2016 Finals series
4	Football Mid North Coast	21	8	3	10	35	41	−6	27	2016 Finals series
5	Thornton Redbacks	21	5	8	8	42	60	−18	23	
6	South Wallsend	21	6	2	13	33	55	−22	20	
7	Wallsend	21	4	4	13	39	68	−29	16	
8	Warners Bay	21	3	4	14	35	66	−31	13	

Source: sportstg.com
Rules for classification: 1) points; 2) goal difference; 3) number of goals scored.
(C) Champions

Semi-finals
1	Merewether United	3
4	Football Mid North Coast	0
2	Adamstown Rosebud	0
3	Valentine FC	8

Grand Final
Merewether United	3
Valentine FC	2

== Cup Competitions ==
=== FFA Cup Preliminary rounds ===
Northern NSW soccer clubs competed in 2015 within the Northern NSW Preliminary rounds for the 2015 FFA Cup. In addition to the A-League club Newcastle Jets, the two Round 7 winners - Broadmeadow Magic and Edgeworth FC - qualified for the final rounds of the 2015 FFA Cup, entering at the Round of 32, where they were both eliminated.
