= 2014 Northern NSW Football season =

Northern NSW Football
- Season: 2014
- Champions: Lambton Jaffas

The 2014 Northern NSW Football season was the first season under the new competition format in northern New South Wales. The competition consisted of six divisions across the district. The overall premier for the new structure qualified for the National Premier Leagues finals series, competing with the other state federation champions in a final knockout tournament to decide the National Premier Leagues Champion for 2014.

== League Tables ==
=== 2014 National Premier League Northern NSW ===
NPL Northern NSW
- Season: 2014
- Champions: Lambton Jaffas
- Premiers: Newcastle Jets Youth
- Relegated: Lake Macquarie City
- Matches: 90
- Goals: 298 (3.31 per match)
- Top goalscorer: Kane Goodchild (Charlestown) (13)
- Biggest home win: Edgeworth 7-0 Charlestown
- Biggest away win: Adamstown Rosebud 0-5 Lambton Jaffas
- Highest scoring: Edgeworth 7-0 Charlestown; Newcastle Jets Youth 5-2 Weston Workers; Lambton Jaffas 5-2 Lake Macquarie; Adamstown Rosebud 5-2 Lake Macquarie

The 2014 National Premier League Northern NSW season was played over 18 rounds, from February to August 2014. The bottom team was relegated to the 2015 Northern NSW State League Division 1.

Pos	Team	Pld	W	D	L	GF	GA	GD	Pts	Qualification or relegation
1	Newcastle Jets Youth	18	10	4	4	41	24	+17	34	2014 Northern NSW Finals
2	Weston Workers	18	9	5	4	34	29	+5	32	2014 National Premier Leagues Finals (Note: As an A-League Youth team, Newcastle Jets Youth were unable to claim Northern NSW's National Premier Leagues Finals spot, which was given to the runners up.)
3	Lambton Jaffas (C)	18	9	3	6	37	22	+15	30	2014 Northern NSW Finals
4	Charlestown City Blues	18	8	4	6	31	30	+1	28	2014 Northern NSW Finals
5	Edgeworth Eagles	18	7	6	5	28	19	+9	27	2014 Northern NSW Finals
6	Hamilton Olympic	18	7	5	6	30	28	+2	26	
7	South Cardiff	18	6	3	9	24	34	−10	21	
8	Adamstown Rosebud	18	6	3	9	24	41	−17	21	
9	Broadmeadow Magic	18	6	2	10	24	27	−3	20	
10	Lake Macquarie City (R)	18	3	3	12	25	44	−19	12	Relegated to 2015 Northern NSW State League

Source: foxsportspulse.com
Rules for classification: 1) points; 2) goal difference; 3) number of goals scored.
(C) Champions; (R) Relegated

==== Finals ====
Qualifying final
2	Weston Workers	3
3	Lambton Jaffas	2
4	Charlestown City Blues	2
5	Edgeworth Eagles	1

Major semi-final
1	Newcastle Jets Youth	2
2	Weston Workers	3
Minor semi-final
3	Lambton Jaffas	3
4	Charlestown City Blues	1

Preliminary final
1	Newcastle Jets Youth	3
3	Lambton Jaffas	4

Grand final
2	Weston Workers	0
3	Lambton Jaffas	2

==== Top Scorers ====
Rank	Player	Club	Goals
1	(Australia) Kane Goodchild	Charlestown	13
2	(Australia) Sam Walker	Broadmeadow Magic	12
3	(Australia) James Byrnes	South Cardiff	10
4	(Australia) Kale Bradbery	Lambton Jaffas	9
5	(Australia) Nicholas Bale	Hamilton Olympic	8

=== 2014 Northern NSW State League Division 1 ===
Northern NSW State League Division 1
- Season: 2014
- Champions: Maitland FC
- Promoted: Maitland FC
- Matches: 84
- Goals: 393 (4.68 per match)
- Top goalscorer: Ben Martin (24)
- Biggest home win: Valentine FC 12-0 West Wallsend FC
- Biggest away win: West Wallsend FC 0-11 Valentine FC
- Highest scoring: Valentine FC 12-0 West Wallsend FC

The 2014 Northern NSW State League Division 1 season was the first edition of the new Northern NSW State League Division 1 as the second level domestic association football competition in the district of Northern NSW. 8 teams competed, all playing each other three times for a total of 21 rounds, with the top team at the end of the year being promoted to the 2015 National Premier Leagues Northern NSW, subject to meeting criteria.

Pos	Team	Pld	W	D	L	GF	GA	GD	Pts	Qualification or relegation
1	Maitland (C, P)	21	20	0	1	93	12	+81	60	Promoted to the 2015 National Premier League Northern NSW
2	Valentine FC	21	19	0	2	91	10	+81	57	2014 Northern NSW State League Division 1 Finals
3	Belmont Swansea	21	10	4	7	42	34	+8	34	2014 Northern NSW State League Division 1 Finals
4	Thornton Redbacks	21	7	3	11	35	45	−10	24	2014 Northern NSW State League Division 1 Finals
5	Toronto Awaba	21	5	5	11	28	62	−34	20	
6	Cessnock City	21	5	4	12	46	60	−14	19	
7	Singleton Strikers	21	5	2	14	36	70	−34	17	
8	West Wallsend	21	3	2	16	16	97	−81	11	

(C) Champions; (P) Promoted

==== Finals ====
Semi-finals
1	Maitland FC	4	9	13
4	Thornton Redbacks	0	1	1
2	Valentine FC	4	3	7
3	Belmont Swansea United	1	0	1

Grand final
1	Maitland FC	3
2	Valentine FC	1

=== 2014 Zone Premier League ===
Zone Premier League
- Season: 2014
- Champions: Cooks Hill United
- Matches: 90
- Goals: 320 (3.56 per match)
- Biggest home win: Barnsley FC 6-0 Cardiff City FC; Wallsend FC 6-0 Swansea FC
- Biggest away win: Cooks Hill United 1-6 Barnsley FC
- Highest scoring: Barnsley FC 4-5 Mayfield United

The 2014 Zone Premier League season was the first edition of the new Zone Premier League as the third level domestic association football competition in the district of Northern NSW. 10 teams competed, all playing each other twice for a total of 18 rounds.

Pos	Team	Pld	W	D	L	GF	GA	GD	Pts	Qualification or relegation
1	New Lambton Eagles	18	14	2	2	36	19	+17	44	2014 Northern NSW State League Division 1 Finals
2	Mayfield United	18	13	3	2	44	26	+18	42	2014 Northern NSW State League Division 1 Finals
3	Wallsend FC (P)	18	8	5	5	37	24	+13	29	Promoted to the 2015 Northern NSW State League Division 1 (Note: Promoted as a result of league restructuring by Northern NSW Football.)
4	Cooks Hill United (C, P)	18	9	2	7	38	30	+8	29	Promoted to the 2015 Northern NSW State League Division 1
5	Barnsley FC	18	7	4	7	40	34	+6	25	
6	Dudley Redhead	18	7	2	9	38	40	−2	23	
7	Swansea FC	18	7	1	10	31	37	−6	22	
8	Newcastle Uni FC	18	5	4	9	26	27	−1	19	
9	Kahibah FC (P)	18	2	5	11	13	36	−23	11	Promoted to the 2015 Northern NSW State League Division 1
10	Cardiff City FC	18	3	2	13	17	47	−30	11	

(C) Champions; (P) Promoted

==== Finals ====
Semi-finals
1	New Lambton Eagles	0	3	3
4	Cooks Hill United	2	2	4
2	Mayfield United	2	4	5
3	Wallsend FC	1	1	2

Grand final
2	Mayfield United	1
4	Cooks Hill United	2

=== 2014 Zone League 1 ===
Zone League 1
- Season: 2014
- Champions: Beresfield United

The 2014 Zone League 1 season was the first edition of the Zone League 1 as the fourth level domestic association football competition in the district of Northern NSW. 9 teams competed, all playing each other twice for a total of 16 matches.

Pos	Team	Pld	W	D	L	GF	GA	GD	Pts	Qualification or relegation
1	Beresfield United (C, P)	16	12	2	2	46	17	+29	38	Promoted to the 2015 Zone Premier League (Note: Promoted as a result of league restructuring by Northern NSW Football.)
2	Garden Suburb (P)	16	12	1	3	55	20	+35	37	Promoted to the 2015 Zone Premier League
3	Jesmond FC	16	8	2	6	28	26	+2	26	2014 Zone League 1 Finals
4	Newcastle Suns (P)	16	8	0	8	37	30	+7	24	Promoted to the 2015 Zone Premier League
5	Kotara South	16	8	0	8	33	28	+5	24	
6	Nelson Bay	16	7	2	7	21	34	−13	23	
7	Warners Bay	16	5	3	8	26	37	−11	18	
8	Morriset United	16	4	1	11	31	39	−8	13	
9	Westlakes Wildcats	16	2	1	13	13	59	−46	7	
10	Belmont Tingira (R)	0	0	0	0	0	0	0	0	Team withdrew pre-season

(C) Champions; (P) Promoted; (R) Relegated

==== Finals ====
Semi-finals
1	Beresfield United	1	4	5
4	Newcastle Suns	2	0	2
2	Garden Suburb	3	3
3	Jesmond FC	5	5

Grand final
1	Beresfield United	3
3	Jesmond FC	1

=== 2014 Zone League 2 ===
Zone League 2
- Season: 2014
- Champions: Raymond Terrace

The 2014 Zone League 2 season was the first edition of the Zone League 2 as the fifth level domestic association football competition in the district of Northern NSW. 10 teams competed, all playing each other twice for a total of 18 matches.

Pos	Team	Pld	W	D	L	GF	GA	GD	Pts	Qualification or relegation
1	Beresfield FC (P)	18	14	1	3	78	22	+56	43	Promoted to the 2015 Zone League 1 (Note: Promoted as a result of league restructuring by Northern NSW Football.)
2	Raymond Terrace (C)	18	12	3	3	53	26	+27	39	2014 Zone League 2 Finals
3	Muswellbrook FC	18	11	3	4	57	49	+8	36	2014 Zone League 2 Finals
4	Hamilton Olympic B	18	10	4	4	51	32	+19	34	2014 Zone League 2 Finals
5	Stockton Sharks (P)	18	10	4	4	45	37	+8	34	Promoted to the 2015 Zone League 1
6	Charlestown City Blues B (P)	18	6	1	11	36	50	−14	19	Promoted to the 2015 Zone League 1
7	Newcastle University FC	18	4	4	10	40	53	−13	16	
8	Plattsburg Maryland	18	5	1	12	29	53	−24	16	
9	Merewether Advance	18	2	4	12	34	69	−35	10	
10	Medowie FC	18	2	3	13	32	64	−32	9	

(C) Champions; (P) Promoted

==== Finals ====
Semi-finals
1	Beresfield FC	1	2	3
4	Hamilton Olympic B	2	2	4
2	Raymond Terrace	1	7	8
3	Muswellbrook FC	1	1	2

Grand final
2	Raymond Terrace	3
4	Hamilton Olympic B	1

=== 2014 Zone League 3 ===
Zone League 3
- Season: 2014
- Champions: Kurri Kurri

The 2014 Zone League 3 season was the first edition of the Zone League 3 as the sixth level domestic association football competition in the district of Northern NSW. 7 teams competed, all playing each other twice for a total of 18 matches.

Pos	Team	Pld	W	D	L	GF	GA	GD	Pts	Qualification or relegation
1	Hunter Simba (P)	18	12	1	5	38	13	+25	37	Promoted to the 2015 Zone League 2 (Note: Promoted as a result of league restructuring by Northern NSW Football.)
2	Cooks Hill United B	18	9	3	6	22	20	+2	30	2014 Zone League 3 Finals
3	Kurri Kurri (C, P)	18	7	7	4	30	27	+3	28	Promoted to the 2015 Zone League 2
4	RAAF Williamtown	18	7	5	6	34	26	+8	26	2014 Zone League 3 Finals
5	Tenambit Sharks (P)	18	6	7	5	19	18	+1	25	Promoted to the 2015 Zone League 2
6	Mayfield United B	18	4	5	9	30	37	−7	17	
7	Dudley Redhead B	18	1	6	11	11	43	−32	9	
8	Dungog (R)	0	0	0	0	0	0	0	0	Team withdrew pre-season

(C) Champions; (P) Promoted; (R) Relegated

==== Finals ====
Semi-finals
1	Hunter Simba	2	2	4
4	RAAF Williamtown	2	1	3
2	Cooks Hill United B	0	1	1
3	Kurri Kurri	1	3	4

Grand final
1	Hunter Simba	1
3	Kurri Kurri	3

=== 2014 Women's Premier League ===
Herald Women's Premier League
- Season: 2014
- Champions: U18 Emerging Jets
- Premiers: Adamstown Rosebud

The highest tier domestic football competition in Northern NSW for women was known for sponsorship reasons as the Herald Women's Premier League. The 8 teams played a quadruple round-robin for a total of 20 games, followed by a finals series.

Pos	Team	Pld	W	D	L	GF	GA	GD	Pts	Qualification or relegation
1	Adamstown Rosebud	20	18	1	1	107	14	+93	55	2014 Finals series
2	U18 Emerging Jets (C)	20	16	1	3	88	24	+64	49	2014 Finals series
3	Merewether United	20	9	3	8	56	43	+13	30	2014 Finals series
4	Valentine FC	20	8	3	9	57	53	+4	27	2014 Finals series
5	Thornton Redbacks	20	2	1	17	16	100	−84	7	
6	Football Mid North Coast	20	2	1	17	14	104	−90	7	

Source: sportstg.com
Rules for classification: 1) points; 2) goal difference; 3) number of goals scored.
(C) Champions

Semi-finals
1	Adamstown Rosebud	4
4	Valentine FC	1
2	U18 Emerging Jets	3
3	Merewether United	2

Grand final
Adamstown Rosebud	2
U18 Emerging Jets	5

== Cup Competitions ==
=== 2014 NNSWF State Cup ===
2014 NNSWF State Cup
- Dates: 2 March – 16 July 2014

Final positions
- Champions: Broadmeadow Magic FC (2nd title)
- Runners-up: South Cardiff

2014 was the 5th edition of the NNSWF State Cup, which served as the preliminary rounds for the FFA Cup for the Northern NSW Federation. The Cup winner and runner-up entered the FFA Cup at the Round of 32. The Cup competition, which was open to all men's NNSWF Premier Competition Clubs and Senior Zone Member Clubs, consisted of five rounds, quarter-finals, semi-finals and a final. Broadmeadow Magic FC clinched the 2014 Cup with a 6–5 victory over South Cardiff.
