= 2012 Northern NSW State League Division 2 =

Northern NSW State League Division 2
- Season: 2012
- Champions: Lambton Jaffas FC
- Promoted: Lambton Jaffas FC
- Matches: 84
- Biggest home win: Lambton Jaffas 11-0 Singleton Strikers (26 May 2012)
- Biggest away win: Thornton Redbacks 1-16 Lambton Jaffas (21 April 2012)
- Highest scoring: Thornton Redbacks 1-16 Lambton Jaffas (21 April 2012)

Lambton Jaffas were the Minor Premiers as well as Grand Final winners in 2012.

== League tables ==
Pos	Team	Pld	W	D	L	GF	GA	GD	Pts	Qualification or relegation
1	Lambton Jaffas (C, P)	21	17	2	2	82	11	+71	53	Promotion to 2013 NNSW State League
2	Adamstown Rosebud	21	16	2	3	59	14	+45	50	2012 NNSW State League Div 2 Finals
3	Maitland	21	13	2	6	59	23	+36	41	2012 NNSW State League Div 2 Finals
4	Toronto Awaba	21	11	2	8	52	39	+13	35	2012 NNSW State League Div 2 Finals
5	Cessnock City	21	10	0	11	43	50	−7	30	
6	Belmont Swansea	21	5	3	13	36	57	−21	18	
7	Singleton Strikers	21	5	1	15	22	81	−59	16	
8	Thornton Redbacks	21	0	2	19	14	92	−78	2	

Updated to match(es) played on 12 August 2012. Source:
Rules for classification: 1) points; 2) goal difference; 3) number of goals scored.
(C) Champions; (P) Promoted

=== Finals ===
Semi-finals
1	Lambton Jaffas FC	4	3	7
4	Toronto Awaba	3	0	3
2	Adamstown Rosebud	2	1	3
3	Maitland FC	0	1	1

Final
1	Lambton Jaffas FC	1
2	Adamstown Rosebud	0
