= George Arthur (Australian soccer) =

Australian soccer player

Personal information
- Full name: George Arthur
- Date of birth: 23 February 1925
- Place of birth: Adamstown, New South Wales
- Date of death: 28 March 1990 (aged 65)
- Place of death: New South Wales, Australia
- Position: Wing half

Senior career*
Years	Team	Apps	(Gls)
- Merewether
1943–1961	Wallsend FC	420	(100)
- Lysaghts Orb
- Blacksmiths Rangers

International career^{‡}
1956	Australia	3	
- * Club domestic league appearances and goals as of 11 May 2009 ‡ National team caps and goals as of 11 May 2009

George Arthur (23 February 1925 – 28 March 1990) was an Australian soccer player who played for Wallsend Football Club and Australia.

== Playing career ==
Arthur began his senior career with Merewether at the age of 17. He later joined Wallsend where he played over 400 first grade appearances and served as captain. He later had stints with Lysaghts Orb and Blacksmiths Rangers.

Arthur was a member of the Australian team at the 1956 Summer Olympics. The Sydney Morning Herald called his performance in his debut against Japan "outstanding", noting that he was a surprise selection for the team. After Australia's elimination against India in their second match, Arthur only played once more for the national team, a post-Olympics friendly match against India in December 1956.
