= Newcastle Jets FC Youth =

Australian youth football club

Newcastle Jets Youth
- Full name: Newcastle Jets Football Club Youth
- Nicknames: Jets, Jets Youth
- Short name: NEW
- Founded: 2008; 18 years ago
- Ground: Lake Macquarie Regional Football Facility
- Owner: Maverick Sports Partners
- Chairman: Maurice Bisetto
- Manager: Chris Zoricich
- League: NSW League One; A-League Youth
- 2026: 14th of 16
Home colours	Away colours	Third colours

Newcastle Jets Youth is the youth system of Newcastle Jets Football Club based Newcastle, New South Wales, Australia. The academy teams compete in NSW League One (in youth team & U20) and Football NSW Youth League Two (U18, U16, U15, U14 & U13 age brackets).

== Youth team history ==
The team was founded in 2008, as a Newcastle Jets representative team for the inaugural season of the National Youth League/Y-League/A-League Youth competition. On 19 September 2013, it was confirmed that the team would compete in the National Premier Leagues Northern NSW competition from 2014 to 2019. They played in the National Premier Leagues Northern NSW from 2014 to 2019, with the majority of their home games at Jack McLaughlan Oval.

For the 2020 season onwards, they transferred to the National Premier Leagues NSW, within the newly created NPL4 Division. They were promoted to the NPL2 Division mid-season, when the 2020 season resumed in July.

From the 2023 season onwards, they competed in the Football NSW League Two competition. In 2023 they came third, missing out on promotion. In 2024, they went through the entirety of the NSW League Two season unbeaten, winning 23 games and drawing 5 as they won the league by 13 points. As a result of this season, they were promoted to the Football NSW League One competition for the 2025 season.

== Results by season ==
Season (Competition)	Position
2014 NPL Northern NSW	1st
2015 NPL Northern NSW	7th
2016 NPL Northern NSW	5th
2017 NPL Northern NSW	10th
2018 NPL Northern NSW	7th
2019 NPL Northern NSW	8th
2020 NPL 2 NSW	11th (Note: Promoted mid-season due to COVID-19)
2021 NPL 4 NSW	— (Note: Season cancelled due to COVID-19)
2022 Football NSW League Three	1st
2023 Football NSW League Two	3rd
2024 Football NSW League Two	1st (Promoted)
2025 Football NSW League One	5th

== Current squad ==
As of 15 September 2026

Note: Flags indicate national team as defined under FIFA eligibility rules; some limited exceptions apply. Players may hold more than one non-FIFA nationality.

No.	Pos.	Nation	Player
—	GK	AUS	Bryn Wells
—	GK	AUS	Cayden Lobach
—	GK	AUS	Oscar Archbold
—	DF	AUS	Angus Reid
—	DF	AUS	Callan Prestwidge
—	DF	AUS	Cory Everett
—	DF	AUS	Everett Bell
—	DF	AUS	Harry Butcher
—	DF	AUS	Jake Guest
—	DF	AUS	Kaiden Walshe
—	DF	AUS	Makye Buettner
—	MF	AUS	Archie Brideson
—	MF	MLT	Ethan Debono

No.	Pos.	Nation	Player
—	MF	AUS	Finn Boulton
—	MF	AUS	Happy Venables
—	MF	AUS	Janni Rafty
—	MF	AUS	Luca West
—	MF	AUS	Nicholas Badolato
—	MF	AUS	Will Kauter
—	FW	AUS	Cruz Sartorio
—	FW	AUS	Dash Baker
—	FW	AUS	Jake Goodwin
—	FW	AUS	Jesse Hill
—	FW	AUS	Lucas Johnson
—	FW	AUS	Luka Bennell

== Notable Academy graduates ==
Players who have at least 5 first-team appearances for Newcastle or have represented a country at full international level, are categorised by the decade in which they were graduated from the academy.

=== 2000s ===
- (Australia) Ben Kantarovski
- (Timor-Leste) Jesse Pinto
- (Australia) James Virgili
- (Australia) Sean Rooney
- (Australia) Brodie Mooy

=== 2010s ===
- (Australia) Taylor Regan
- (Croatia) Mario Šimić
- (Australia) Sam Gallaway
- (Australia) Jacob Pepper
- (Australia) Mitchell Oxborrow
- (Australia) Radovan Pavicevic
- (Australia) Brandon Lundy
- (Australia) Nick Cowburn
- (Australia) Angus Thurgate
- (Australia) Patrick Langlois
- (Australia) Noah James

=== 2020s ===
- (Australia) Blake Archbold
- (Australia) Archie Goodwin
- (Samoa) Pharrell Trainor
- (Australia) Alex Nunes
- (Australia) Will Dobson
- (Australia) Christian Bracco
- (Australia) Xavier Bertoncello
- (Australia) Max Cooper

== Stadium ==
The team hosted its home matches at Lake Macquarie Regional Football Facility in Speers Point, previously the team played at Wanderers Oval in Broadmeadow and Adamstown Oval in Adamstown, both within the city of Newcastle. For the 2017–18 season, both the Youth and A-League Women teams moved to the No.2 Sportsground in Newcastle West, though the youth team would continue to train out of their training base at the University of Newcastle.

== Current staff ==
Position	Name
Head Coach	(New Zealand) Chris Zoricich
U20s Head Coach/Youth Team Assistant	(Australia) David Rosewarne
Goalkeeper Coach	(Australia) Greg Lowe
Goalkeeper Coach	(Australia) Blake Redman

== Honours ==
- National Premier Leagues Northern NSW Premiership
  - Premiers (1): 2014
- NSW League Two Premiership
  - Premiers (1): 2024
- NSW League Three Premiership
  - Premiers (1): 2022
- NSW League Three Championship
  - Champions (1): 2022
- Y-League/A-League Youth Premiership
  - Runners-up (1): 2013–14
