= Maitland FC =

- Full name: Maitland Football Club
- Nickname: Magpies
- Founded: 1961
- Ground: Cooks Square Park, East Maitland
- Capacity: 350 seating
- Coordinates: 32°45′6.8″S 151°34′55.05″E
- President: Steve Good
- Head Coach: Mick Bolch
- League: NPL NNSW
- 2026: 2nd of 12
- Website: http://www.maitlandfc.com.au
Home colours

Maitland Football Club, commonly known as Maitland FC, or simply as Maitland, is an Australian semi-professional soccer club based in East Maitland, a suburb of Maitland, New South Wales.

== History ==
In 2014, Maitland FC were premiers in the Northern NSW State League Division 1. The premiership resulted in Maitland being promoted back to the top tier of Northern NSW Football, now known as National Premier Leagues Northern NSW, for the first time since 2002. Maitland capped off a successful 2014 by winning the Grand Final 3–1 against Valentine FC in extra time.

Ben Martin was the highest goal scorer in the league in 2013 with 30 goals. In 2014, he was again the highest goal scorer with 24 goals.

In 2019 Maitland won the Northern NSW NPL premiership qualifying them for the NPL Finals. In the quarter finals they defeated the Tasmanian champions Devonport City. They progressed through the preliminary rounds of the FFA Cup with wins against Swansea, Charlestown City Blues, Boambee Bombers and Hamilton Olympic. This qualified them for the FFA Cup proper where in the Round of 32 they lost 2–0 at home to the A-League club Central Coast Mariners.

In 2021 Maitland added Junior Development Leagues (JDL, formerly SAP) and Women's Premier League (WPL) squads, and has more than doubled in size. In their inaugural season, the WPL Senior squad took out the 2021 Women's State Cup, coached by Keelan Hamilton.

== Current squad ==
Note: Flags indicate national team as defined under FIFA eligibility rules; some limited exceptions apply. Players may hold more than one non-FIFA nationality.

No.	Pos.	Nation	Player
—			Connor Butchard
—			Alex Read
—	FW	AUS	Braedyn Crowley
—			Charles Cox
—			Flynn Goodman
—	FW		James Thompson
—			Joel Clissold
—			Lachlan Webb
—	FW	AUS	Damon Green

No.	Pos.	Nation	Player
—	GK		Paul Bitz
—			Sean Pratt
—			Tom Davies
—			Isaac Collins
—	DF		Takudzwa Tarrel Chisunga
—			Taylor Pate
—			Tyran Cousins
—			Tyrell Paulson
—			Will Mcfarlane
—		AUS	Jackson Burston
—			Daniel Shafer

== FFA Cup results ==
Season	Round	Home team (tier)	Score	Away team (tier)
2014	Northern NSW Preliminary Round 1 Southern Zone	South Cardiff (2)	1–1 (6–5 pens)	Maitland FC (3)
2015	Preliminary Round 3: Northern NSW – Southern Zone	Cooks Hill United (3)	0–8	Maitland FC (2)
2015	Preliminary Round 4: Northern NSW – Southern Zone	Charlestown City Blues (2)	3–2	Maitland FC (2)
2016	Preliminary Round 3: Northern NSW – Southern Zone	Hunter Simba (6)	1–8	Maitland FC (2)
2016	Preliminary Round 4: Northern NSW – Southern Zone	Adamstown Rosebud (2)	2–1	Maitland FC (2)

== Honours ==
- National Premier Leagues Northern NSW / Northern NSW Division One

Premiers (3): 1980, 2019, 2022
Champions (1): 1980

- Northern NSW State League Division 1 (Tier 2)

Premiers (1): 2014
Champions (2): 2009, 2014

- NNSW Football State Cup:

Champions (1): 2026

- Northern NSW NPL Women's

Premiers (2): 2024, 2026
