= Zone Football League =

- Organising body: Newcastle Football; Macquarie Football; Hunter Valley Football
- Founded: 2024; 2011–2023 (as NNSW Zone League) pre-2010 (as NNSW Interdistrict Division One)
- Country: Australia
- Divisions: 3
- Number of clubs: 35; Division One: 12; Division Two: 11; Division Three: 12
- Promotion to: Northern League One
- Domestic cup(s): National; Australia Cup; State; NNSW State Cup
- Current champions: ZL1 Kotara South (2026); ZL2 Bolwarra Lorn JSC; ZL3 Garden Suburb
- Current premiers: ZL1 Newcastle Olympic (2026); ZL2 Bolwarra Lorn JSC; ZL3 Charlestown JFC
- Website: northernnswfootball.com.au/zone-football-league

The Zone Football League is an Australian amateur soccer league based in Northern New South Wales administered jointly by Newcastle Football, Macquarie Football and Hunter Valley Football; sub-federations respectively of Northern NSW Football. The league is the third tier of football in the NNSWF. First division was known NNSW Interdistrict Division One prior to 2011, NNSW Zone Football Premier League (2011–2023) and renamed Zone Football League in 2024.

Covering almost 33,000 square kilometres, across more than 10 Local Government Areas, football clubs are scattered across the Hunter Region.

== History ==
Graded Interdistrict competitions have survived alongside the 2 Premier Divisions of local Northern NSW Football for decades.

The 2011 season commenced with 10 teams Cardiff City, Cooks Hill United, Dudley Redhead, Mayfield, Morisset, New Lambton, Swansea, Thornton Park and University in the 1st division competition.

After the 2011 season, Thornton Park (now Thornton Redbacks FC) were elected for promotion to NSW State League Division 1, Kahibah was relegated with Warners Bay and Plattsburg Maryland taking their places in 2012.

The competition briefly dropped to a 7 team competition in 2020, before resuming to a 10 team competition. 2023 saw the expansion of the Zone League 1 from 10 to 12 teams among a greater restructure of the Zone Football Leagues.

From 2024 there will be promotion and relegation between NNSW State League Division 1 and Zone Football League 1 and promotion and relegation between all Zone Leagues.

In 2025 expressions of interest were sought for a women's Zone Football League to be established. In March 2026 the seven founding clubs of the inaugural 2026 Women's Zone Football League were announced. Cooks Hill United FC, Greta Branxton FC, Lochinvar Rovers FC, New Lambton FC, Northumberland United, Southern United FC and University of Newcastle FC.

== Format ==
Teams have a first grade side, reserve grade side and third grade side. The regular season takes place, with each team playing each other once at home and once away. The team that finishes first at the end of the regular season is crowned premiers and promoted, the team who finishes last are relegated.

The top four teams contest the Finals Series. For the semi-finals, 1st vs 4th and 2nd vs 3rd. The winner of each semi-final progresses straight to the Grand Final where the winner of that game is crowned champions.

== Clubs ==
The following clubs will compete in the Zone Football League for the 2026 season.

=== Division One ===
Club	Nickname(s)	Founded	LGA	Ground	Location
Cardiff City	Tigers	1998	Lake Macquarie	Evans Park	Cardiff
Kotara South	Tigers		Newcastle	Nesbitt Park	Kotara
Mayfield United S	Tigers	1922	Newcastle	Mayfield Park	Mayfield
Newcastle Olympic	Warriors	1976	Newcastle	Islington Oval	Islington
Newcastle Suns	Suns	1997	Newcastle	Myers Park	Broadmeadow
Northumberland United	Crabs	2023	Newcastle	Heaton Park	Jesmond
Stockton	Sharks		Newcastle	Corroba Oval	Stockton
Swansea	Swans	1950	Lake Macquarie	Chapman Oval	Swansea
Thornton	Redbacks	1978	Maitland	Thornton Park	Thornton
University of Newcastle	The Students	1962	Newcastle	Ray Watt Oval	Callaghan
Warners Bay	Panthers		Lake Macquarie	John Street Oval	Warners Bay
Westlakes	Wildcats	1963	Lake Macquarie	Fishburn Field	Rathmines

Italics indicate the club has a team in a higher division.

=== Division Two ===
Club	Nickname(s)	Founded	LGA	Ground	Location
Bolwarra Lorn	Bushrangers	1974	Maitland	Bolwarra Oval	Bolwarra
Cooks Hill United	Cookers	1997	Newcastle	National Park	Newcastle West
Greta Branxton	Wildcats	1969	Cessnock	Miller Park	East Branxton
Lambton Jaffas Juniors	Jaffas	1957	Newcastle	Harry Edwards Oval	Lambton
Merewether Advance	Roosters	1894	Newcastle	Jesmond Park	Jesmond
Minmi	Wanderers	1884	Newcastle	Minmi Field	Minmi
Nelson Bay	Marlins	1980	Port Stephens	Tomaree Sports Complex	Nelson Bay
New Lambton Juniors	Golden Eagles		Newcastle	Novocastrian Park	New Lambton
North United	Wolves	2000	Maitland	Lorn Park	Lorn
South Maitland	Phoenix	2021	Maitland	Robins Oval	South Maitland
Southern United	Ospreys	2022	Mid Coast	Boronia Park	Forster

=== Division Three ===
Club	Nickname(s)	Founded	LGA	Ground	Location
Barnsley United	Bulldogs	1962	Lake Macquarie	Taylor Park	Barnsley
Bellbird	Bombers		Cessnock	Carmichael Park	Bellbird
Charlestown	Hammers	1900	Lake Macquarie	Charlestown Oval	Charlestown
Fletcher	Saints	2015	Newcastle	Federal Park	Wallsend
Garden Suburb	Kingfishers	1964	Lake Macquarie	Lance York Oval	Garden Suburb
Kurri Kurri	Roosters	1904	Cessnock	Biralee Oval	Kurri Kurri
Maitland Juniors	Magpies	1957	Maitland	Fieldsend Oval	Metford
Medowie	Crybabies	1979	Port Stephens	Yulong Oval	Medowie
Merewether United	Sea Eagles	1953	Newcastle	Myamblah Crescent	Merewether
Musswellbrook	Eagles	1924	Musswellbrook	Victoria Park Sportsground	Musswellbrook
Rutherford	Dragons	1967	Maitland	Norm Chapman Oval	Rutherford
Southern Lakes United	Hurricanes	2011	Lake Macquarie	Cooranbong Sports Complex	Cooranbong

=== Women's ===
Club	Nickname(s)	Founded	LGA	Ground	Location
Cooks Hill	Cookers	1997	Newcastle	National Park	Newcastle West
Greta Branxton	Wildcats	1969	Cessnock	Miller Park	East Branxton
Lochinvar	Rovers	1975	Maitland	Lochinvar Sports Complex	Lochinvar
New Lambton	The Eagles		Newcastle	Novocastrian Park	New Lambton
Northumberland United	Crabs	2023	Newcastle	Heaton Oval	Jesmond
Raymond Terrace	Lions	1957	Port Stephens	King Park	Raymond Terrace
Southern United	Ospreys	2022	Mid Coast	Boronia Park	Forster
University of Newcastle	Students	1962	Newcastle	Ray Watt Oval	Callaghan
Warners Bay	Panthers		Lake Macquarie	John Street Oval	Warners Bay

== Winners ==
=== 2012–2023 ===
In 2012, two more divisions were added. In 2023, the third division was removed.

Champions
Season	Premier Division	Division One	Division Two	Division Three
2012	Cooks Hill United	Garden Suburb	Westlakes Wildcats	Stockton Junior
2013	Uni Mens	Wallsend	Charlestown Azzurri	Beresfield
2014	Cooks Hill United	Beresfield	Raymond Terrace	Kurri Kurri
2015	Beresfield	Warners Bay	Raymond Terrace	New Lambton
2016	Newcastle Suns	Raymond Terrace	Hamilton Olympic	Argenton United
2017	Beresfield	Raymond Terrace	Hunter Simba	Hamilton Azzurri
2018	Newcastle Suns	Raymond Terrace	Hunter Simba	Bolwarra Lorn
2019	Swansea	Cooks Hill United	Hamilton Olympic	Minmi
2020	—			
2021	—			
2022	Dudley Redhead	Newcastle Olympic	South Maitland	Newcastle Croatia
2023	Newcastle Suns	Newcastle Croatia	Southern United	—

Premiers
Season	Premier Division	Division One	Division Two	Division Three
2012	Warners Bay	Barnsley	Raymond Terrace	Uni Mens
2013	Uni Mens	Kahibah	Charlestown City Blues	Hunter Simba
2014	New Lambton Eagles	Warners Bay	Charlestown City Blues	Hunter Simba
2015	Beresfield	Cooks Hill United	Raymond Terrace	Wallsend
2016	Mayfield United	Charlestown Junior	Westlakes Wildcats	Argenton United
2017	Newcastle Suns	Barnsley	Argenton United	Maitland
2018	Mayfield United	Westlakes Wildcats	Kahibah	Bolwarra Lorn
2019	Mayfield United	Westlakes Wildcats	Kahibah	Minmi
2020	Cardiff City	Wallsend	North United	
2021	Mayfield United	New Lambton	Minmi Wanderers	Lake Macquarie
2022	Newcastle Suns	Newcastle Olympic	South Maitland	Hamilton Azzurri
2023	Newcastle Suns	Hamilton Azzurri	Southern United	—

=== 2024–present ===
In 2024, the Newcastle Zone League renamed its league and divisions: the Premier Division became Zone League One, Division One became Zone League Two, and Division Two became Zone League Three.

In 2026, the Newcastle Zone League created the Zone Football League Women's competition.

	Premiers			Champions		
Season	ZL1	ZL2	ZL3	ZL1	ZL2	ZL3
2024	Dudley United	Newcastle Croatia	Lambton Jaffas Jrs	Newcastle Suns	Newcastle Croatia	Nelson Bay
2025	Newcastle Croatia	Croudace Bay Utd	Greta Branxton	Newcastle Croatia	Croudace Bay Utd	Greta Branxton
2026	Newcastle Olympic	Bolwarra Lorn	Charlestown Junior	Kotara South	Bolwarra Lorn	Garden Suburb

	Premiers	Champions
Season	ZLW	ZLW
2026	Cooks Hill United	Cooks Hill United

== Past seasons ==
2022
POS	TEAM	P	W	D	L	GD	GF	GA	PTS
1	Newcastle Suns	18	12	3	3	26	51	25	39
2	Dudley Redhead United	18	10	4	4	28	56	28	34
3	Warners Bay	18	11	1	6	12	41	29	34
4	Mayfield United	18	8	7	3	8	30	22	31
5	Hamilton Azzurri	18	9	1	8	-4	36	40	28
6	Cardiff City	18	7	5	6	3	35	32	26
7	Kotara South	18	6	5	7	1	38	37	23
8	Cooks Hill United	18	7	0	11	-9	35	44	21
9	Westlakes Wildcats^{P}	18	3	1	14	-41	19	60	10
10	Swansea FC	18	2	3	13	-24	28	52	9
Table updated 22 January 2023, ^{P} = promoted, italics = another team in higher division

2021
POS	TEAM	P	W	D	L	GD	GF	GA	PTS
1	Mayfield United	18	11	6	1	24	37	13	39
2	Newcastle Suns	18	11	5	2	26	44	18	38
3	Dudley Redhead United	18	9	5	4	20	38	18	32
4	Swansea	18	9	4	5	6	30	24	31
5	Hamilton Azzurri	18	8	5	5	7	28	21	29
6	Cardiff City	18	4	6	8	-11	33	44	18
7	Warners Bay	18	4	4	10	-13	21	34	16
8	Beresfield	18	4	4	10	-17	27	44	16
9	Kotara South	18	3	5	10	-17	24	41	14
10	Cooks Hill United	18	2	6	10	-25	32	57	12
Table updated 22 January 2023, ^{P} = promoted, italics = another team in higher division

2020* (affected by COVID-19)
POS	TEAM	P	W	D	L	GD	GF	GA	PTS
1	Cardiff City	12	8	2	2	11	33	22	26
2	Swansea	12	7	3	2	11	30	19	24
3	Hamilton Azzurri^{P}	12	6	3	3	7	28	21	21
4	Newcastle Suns	12	5	2	5	2	31	29	17
5	Cooks Hill United^{P}	12	4	4	4	-1	26	27	16
6	Mayfield United	12	4	0	8	-3	26	29	12
7	Berefield	12	1	0	11	-27	14	41	3
Table updated 22 January 2023, ^{P} = promoted, italics = another team in higher division

2019
POS	TEAM	P	W	D	L	GD	GF	GA	PTS
1	Mayfield United	18	14	3	1	53	62	9	45
2	Dudley Redhead	18	14	3	1	50	59	9	45
3	Swansea	18	14	0	4	36	64	28	42
4	Kotara South	18	9	0	9	8	38	30	27
5	Newcastle Suns	18	7	4	7	17	53	36	25
6	Beresfield	18	7	2	9	-19	43	62	23
7	Warners Bay	18	6	2	10	-14	33	47	20
8	Raymond Terrace^{P}	18	6	1	11	-33	26	59	19
9	Cardiff City	18	3	3	12	-18	26	44	12
10	Barnsley	18	1	0	17	-80	14	94	3
Table updated 22 January 2023, ^{P} = promoted

2018
POS	TEAM	P	W	D	L	GD	GF	GA	PTS
1	Mayfield United	18	13	5	0	36	55	19	44
2	Newcastle Suns	18	13	1	4	21	53	32	40
3	Dudley Redhead	18	12	3	3	21	42	21	39
4	Kotara South	18	9	4	5	23	46	23	31
5	Swansea	18	8	4	6	-2	30	32	28
6	Warners Bay	18	7	0	11	-9	31	40	21
7	Cardiff City	18	6	2	10	-12	29	41	20
8	Beresfield	18	3	3	12	-31	27	58	12
9	Barnsley^{P}	18	3	2	13	-23	29	52	11
10	Jesmond	18	3	2	13	-24	25	49	11
Table updated 22 January 2023, ^{P} = promoted

2017
POS	TEAM	P	W	D	L	GD	GF	GA	PTS
1	Newcastle Suns	18	14	1	3	56	80	24	43
2	Beresfield	18	9	5	4	22	50	28	32
3	Swansea	18	9	4	5	9	30	21	31
4	Dudley Redhead	18	8	5	5	8	26	18	29
5	Kotara South^{P}	18	8	2	8	-1	30	31	26
6	Mayfield United	18	7	2	9	-4	28	32	23
7	Jesmond^{P}	18	7	2	9	-16	31	47	23
8	Cardiff City	18	6	4	8	-3	36	39	22
9	Warners Bay	18	4	3	11	-35	24	59	15
10	University	18	3	2	13	-36	27	63	11
Table updated 22 January 2023, ^{P} = promoted

2016
POS	TEAM	P	W	D	L	GD	GF	GA	PTS
1	Mayfield United	18	12	2	4	24	49	25	38
2	Dudley Redhead	18	11	1	6	18	49	31	34
3	University	18	9	2	7	9	39	37	29
4	Newcastle Suns	18	8	5	5	2	38	36	29
5	Cardiff City	18	9	2	7	2	33	31	29
6	Beresfield	18	8	3	7	8	44	36	27
7	New Lambton Eagles	18	7	4	7	-6	30	36	25
8	Swansea	18	7	3	8	-3	27	30	24
9	Morisset United^{P}	18	6	1	11	-15	33	48	19
10	Garden Suburb	18	0	3	15	-32	13	45	3
Table updated 22 January 2023, ^{P} = promoted

2015
POS	TEAM	P	W	D	L	GD	GF	GA	PTS
1	Beresfield^{P}	18	14	3	1	40	65	25	45
2	Newcastle Suns^{P}	18	10	1	7	10	49	39	31
3	Swansea	18	9	4	5	9	41	32	31
4	Cardiff City	18	8	5	5	14	41	27	29
5	New Lambton Eagles	18	8	3	7	2	38	36	27
6	University	18	7	4	7	13	47	34	25
7	Mayfield United	18	8	1	9	-8	33	41	25
8	Dudley Redhead	18	7	3	8	2	41	39	24
9	Garden Suburb^{P}	18	3	6	9	-27	33	60	15
10	Barnsley	18	0	2	16	-55	15	70	2
Table updated 22 January 2023, ^{P} = promoted

2014
POS	TEAM	P	W	D	L	GD	GF	GA	PTS
1	New Lambton Eagles	18	14	2	2	27	36	19	44
2	Mayfield	18	13	3	2	18	44	26	42
3	Wallsend^{P}	18	8	5	5	13	37	24	29
4	Cooks Hill United	18	9	2	7	8	38	30	29
5	Barnsley United	18	7	4	7	6	40	34	25
6	Dudley Redhead	18	7	2	9	-2	38	40	23
7	Swansea	18	7	1	10	-6	31	37	22
8	University	18	5	4	9	-1	26	27	19
9	Kahibah^{P}	18	2	5	11	-23	13	36	11
10	Cardiff City	18	3	2	13	-30	17	47	11
Table updated 20 November 2014, ^{P} = promoted

2013
POS	TEAM	P	W	D	L	GD	GF	GA	PTS
1	University	18	10	6	2	27	41	14	36
2	Cooks Hill United	18	10	5	3	29	52	23	35
3	Dudley Redhead	18	9	5	4	5	27	22	32
4	Cardiff City	18	8	5	5	8	39	31	29
5	Mayfield	18	7	5	6	1	32	31	26
6	Swansea	18	5	5	8	-12	18	30	20
7	Barnsley United^{P}	18	5	4	9	1	24	23	19
8	Plattsburg Maryland	18	4	6	8	-10	27	37	18
9	New Lambton Eagles	18	4	5	9	-21	19	40	17
10	Warners Bay	18	1	8	9	-28	10	38	11
Table updated 30 July 2014, ^{P} = promoted

2012
POS	TEAM	P	W	D	L	GD	GF	GA	PTS
1	Warners Bay^{P}	18	14	2	2	32	48	16	44
2	Swansea	18	12	2	4	20	41	21	38
3	Cooks Hill United	18	9	5	4	10	32	22	32
4	New Lambton Eagles	18	9	2	7	8	36	28	29
5	Cardiff City	18	8	2	8	4	40	36	26
6	Plattsburg Maryland^{P}	18	8	0	10	6	42	36	24
7	Mayfield	18	7	3	8	-4	34	30	24
8	Dudley Redhead	18	6	3	9	-6	36	42	21
9	University	18	5	4	9	-4	32	36	19
10	Morisset	18	0	1	17	-74	17	91	1
Table updated 4 July 2013, ^{P} = promoted

2011
POS	TEAM	P	W	D	L	GD	GF	GA	PTS
1	New Lambton Eagles	18	13	2	3	21	44	23	41
2	Morisset^{P}	18	13	0	5	21	43	22	39
3	Cooks Hill United	18	12	0	6	15	42	27	36
4	University	18	11	2	5	13	35	22	35
5	Cardiff City	18	10	2	6	15	43	28	32
6	Swansea	18	8	2	8	6	38	32	26
7	Dudley Redhead^{R}	18	6	3	9	-5	33	38	21
8	Thornton Park^{R}	18	5	1	12	-19	24	43	16
9	Mayfield	18	4	0	14	-25	21	46	12
10	Kahibah	18	1	2	15	-42	15	57	5
Table updated 4 July 2013, ^{P} = promoted, ^{R} = relegated
