= Medowie FC =

- Full name: Medowie Football Club
- Founded: 1979
- Ground: Yulong Oval
- League: Zone League Three
- 2026: 3rd of 11th

Medowie Football Club is an Australian football club based in Medowie, a suburb of the Port Stephens Council local government area in the Hunter Region of New South Wales, Australia. The club currently competes in the Zone League Three.

== History ==
Medowie FC was founded in 1979 as Medowie Soccer Club.

Medowie has experienced a major growth over their nearly 40-year history with the club now home to over 500 players.
