= Valentine FC =

- Full name: Valentine Eleebana Football Club
- Nickname: Phoenix
- Founded: 1994 as Valentine Eleebana FC; 1994 as Belmont Tingira; 2005 as Valentine Belmont FC; 2008 as Valentine Phoenix; 2013 as Valentine FC
- Ground: CB Complex, Valentine
- Capacity: 500
- Coordinates: 33°01′59.8″S 151°39′52.6″E
- President: David Slee
- Head Coach: Lee Sterrey
- League: NPL NNSW
- 2026: 7th of 12
- Website: http://www.vefc.com.au/
| Home colours | Away colours |

Valentine FC is a semi-professional football club based in Valentine in the Hunter Region, New South Wales and is part of the Valentine Eleebana Football Club. Valentine have been promoted to the National Premier Leagues Northern NSW for 2016 with teams in First Grade, Under 23s, Under 19 and Under 17 divisions.

Notable former players include Adam Griffiths, Giancarlo Gallifuoco and Daniel Bowles.

== History ==
Since 1994, Valentine Eleebana FC and Belmont FC have worked closely together to provide a "pathway" for our Junior Players to the highest possible levels of local football. Our jointly owned senior club was Belmont Tingira Soccer Club which played in the 2nd Division from 1994. At the end of the 2005 season, Belmont FC relinquished their ownership of Belmont Tingira which continued in the NEWFM League as part of VEFC, playing under the name Valentine Belmont FC.

VEFC merged with Phoenix Rangers Football Club from season 2008 taking on their State League Licence and changing our playing name to Valentine Phoenix.

In 2014, Valentine was relegated to the NNSW NEWFM First Division.

=== Phoenix Rangers ===
Phoenix in its differing names (Stewart and Lloyds, Tubemakers, Phoenix) was established in 1938 and apart from a hiatus of approx 5 years in the early 80's, was a significant force in the local Football competition throughout this period.

== Honours ==
- As Valentine FC

Northern NSW Division One Premiers: 2015

Northern NSW State Cup Winners: 2010

- As Phoenix Rangers

Northern NSW Division One Premiers & Champions: 2004, 2005
