= Lake Macquarie City FC =

Australian Football club

- Full name: Lake Macquarie City Football Club
- Nicknames: Lakes, Roosters
- Founded: 1912
- Ground: Macquarie Field
- Capacity: 500
- Coordinates: 32°57′35.27″S 151°36′57.77″E
- President: Stephen Graham
- Head Coach: Michael Body
- League: NNSW State League 1
- 2026: 1st of 12 (premiers & promoted) NPL NNSW

Lake Macquarie City FC is a football club in Lake Macquarie, New South Wales. The club was formed in 1912 formed by a group of Scottish miners in the area.

== History ==
Lake Macquarie City Football Club is one of the oldest running football clubs in the Northern NSW region. The club has a strong history and reputation of developing, fostering and producing local players. Throughout its history, the club has been lucky enough to host a number of high-profile matches including Australian National Team games and a friendly game against Tottenham Hotspur FC.

Historically LMCFC home kit is Yellow shirt, blue shorts and white socks. Similar to that of the Brazil national team. Recent times have seen the white socks replaced by yellow socks for reasons unknown. Some supporters have been calling for a return to the original white socks.

For season 2021, the club has rebranded with a new logo. The kits of LMCFC from season 2021 onward are blue and white in colour.

=== Association with Newcastle Jets ===
In 2023, Lake Macquarie City Football Club announced a newly formed partnership with the Newcastle Jets. The strategic partnership intends Jets and LMCFC work together on facility improvements and how these facilities can be more efficiently used in tandem with providing LMCFC with access to coaching expertise and specialist resources.

== Recent seasons ==
2012 season

LMCFC returned to the top tier of NNSW football finishing 2nd.

2013 season

The club lost head coach Chris Turner and a large number of players. They narrowly avoided relegation by defeating fellow relegation threatened West Wallsend FC, 2–1 with a second half winning goal from captain Sean Matthews.

2014 season

In 2014, Lake Macquarie City FC again lost a number of players including captain Sean Matthews, Andre Gumprecht and Damian Brown and played in the NPL Northern NSW. Finishing last in the league, they were relegated to Northern NSW State League Division 1 for 2015.

2015 season

The club was captained by Tom Walker and coached by Barry Ross in the Northern NSW NEWFM First Division season.

2016 season

In 2016, Lake Macquarie City FC announced experienced duo Anthony Richards and Danny Pryde as their head coach and assistant coach respectively. The club played in the Northern NSW NEWFM First Division and had a successful season with the team winning the minor premiership. After a 2-year absence, Lake Macquarie City FC were announced as being promoted back into the NPL Northern NSW after their on-field and off-field success.

2017 season

In 2017, returned to the NPL Northern NSW and hoped to consolidate themselves as a competitive NPL club. They finished 7th.

2018 season

Nick Webb was appointed Head Coach in 2018 but was unable to improve the club's position finishing 8th. Captain Sam Walker finished the season as the NNSW NPL Golden Boot with 16 goals and was also named NPL NNSW Player of the year.

2019 season

LMCFC finished 9th in the league. After the season was completed Nick Webb was replaced as Head Coach by Joshua Rufo.

2020 season

LMCFC finished the season in 10th with only four points.

== First Team squad ==
1st Grade

Note: Flags indicate national team as defined under FIFA eligibility rules; some limited exceptions apply. Players may hold more than one non-FIFA nationality.

No.	Pos.	Nation	Player
—	GK	AUS	Mitchell Callinan
—	DF	AUS	Michael Bru
—	DF	AUS	Carter Smith
—	DF	AUS	Corey Fletcher
—	MF	AUS	Josh Maguire
—	MF	AUS	Campbell Ross
—		AUS	Cooper ver Stegen
—		AUS	Tomasz Kowalski
—		AUS	Beau Wilkins
—		AUS	Darcy Tydd

No.	Pos.	Nation	Player
—		AUS	Jackson Burston
—		AUS	Tim Davies
—	FW	AUS	Kaman Bol
—		AUS	Isaac Nyman
—	GK	AUS	Blake Redman
—		AUS	Joel Cowan
—		AUS	Brendon King
—		AUS	Nicholas Charlesworth
—		AUS	Benjamin Wilson

- Head coach: Michael Body

== Notable former players ==
Note: Flags indicate national team as defined under FIFA eligibility rules; some limited exceptions apply. Players may hold more than one non-FIFA nationality.

No.	Pos.	Nation	Player
—		AUS	Robbie Middleby
—		GER	Andre Gumprecht
—		AUS	Craig Johnston
—		AUS	Craig Deans

== Honours ==
=== 1st Grade ===
Premiers:

NNSW National Premier League/State League (3)
1964, 1982, 2007

Northern NSW State League Division 1 (4)
1958, 2001, 2016, 2026

Champions:

NNSW National Premier League/State League (3)
1962, 1967, 2006

Northern NSW State League Division 1 (1)
1958
