= Thornton Redbacks FC =

- Full name: Thornton Redbacks FC
- Nickname: Redbacks
- Founded: 1978
- Ground: Thornton Park
- Capacity: 400
- Coordinates: 32°46′39.7″S 151°38′30.2″E
- President: Mark Whitchurch
- Head Coach: Scott Winslade (2025)
- League: Zone Football League
- 2026: 3rd of 12
Home colours	Away colours

Thornton Redbacks FC is a semi-professional football club based in Thornton in the Hunter Region of New South Wales. Thornton Redbacks FC currently competes in NNSWF Zone League One with senior teams in First Grade and Reserve Grade, whilst junior teams range from U13 to U18.

NNSWF Zone League One is the third tier of football in the Hunter Region, below two tier of the NNSWF National Premier Leagues and Northern League One.

== History ==
=== Men's Football ===
The club was founded in 1978 as Thornton Park Football Club, and first competed in the Christian Churches competition in the 1979 season. In 1981, Thornton Park FC entered the newly formed NNSW 5th Division, and won the competition in 1985 under the captaincy of former Newcastle KB United goalkeeper Ossie Bellamy.

Over the following years Thornton Park bounced between several divisions before ending up in the Interdistrict 2nd Division for the 1995 season. It was in 1995 that Thornton Park topped the league in the Interdistrict 2nd Division's Reserve Grade before narrowly losing both the Reserve Grade and First Grade grand finals.

For the 1996 season, the NNSW 2HD First Division had too few teams, and so promoted Thornton Park FC into the competition alongside Dudley, Manning Districts, and rivals Beresfield. In the NNSW 2HD First Division Thornton finished 8th of 12 in 1996, and 3rd in 1997. This qualified Thornton for the finals series, where they lost 3-1 to West Wallsend at Macquarie Field.

From 2000 to 2008 Thornton Park FC qualified for the finals on 5 occasions under coach Al Primmer, however never won the competition. Thornton Park remained in this division until 2010, after which they were demoted to the newly formed Zone Premier League (ZPL) due to Thornton Oval's amenities not meeting the NNSW 2HD First Division requirements.

Following the 2011 season in the ZPL, Thornton Park FC was reinstated into the NEWFM First Division. Before the commencement of the 2012 season, the club changed its name to the Thornton Redbacks Football Club.

=== Women's Football ===
In 2013 Thornton Redbacks FC introduced a Zone Football Women's Squad, containing U18's and First Grade teams. In their inaugural seasons the U18's reached the semi-final and First Grade lost the grand final. For the following season both teams were promoted to the NNSW Herald Women's Premier League (WPL).

In 2015, Thornton Redbacks FC formed women's teams in the U14's and U16's. The U14's won their competition, while First Grade, U18's, and U16's all finished 5th in their leagues.

In the 2017 season Thornton's First Grade WPL team finished bottom of the table with 6 points from 18 games with 6 goals scored. As a result Thornton lost their First Grade status for the 2018 season, instead competing in the WPL's U20, U17, and U14 competitions.

In 2019 Thornton were promoted back to WPL First Grade alongside Football Mid North Coast to bolster the number of teams in the competition. Having been out of First Grade for a season, Thornton struggled, finishing 7th of the 8 teams. The following year was the worst for Thornton's WPL First Grade side, finishing the 14-game season with 0 points and 75 goals scored against.

At the conclusion of this 2020 campaign, Thornton Redbacks FC's Women's teams were dissolved, and have not competed since.
