= Charlestown Azzurri FC =

Australian football club

- Full name: Charlestown Azzurri Football Club
- Nickname: Azzurri
- Founded: 1963
- Ground: Lisle Carr Oval
- Capacity: 3000
- Coordinates: 32.978419°S 151.714924°E
- President: Roby Valentinis
- Head coach: Josh Maguire
- League: NPL NNSW
- 2026: 12th of 12 (Relegated) NNSW Northern League One

Charlestown Azzurri FC (formerly Charlestown City Blues FC) is an Australian soccer club based in Whitebridge, a suburb of Lake Macquarie, New South Wales. The club currently competes in the Northern League One (NNSW NL1).

== History ==
Charlestown United was founded in 1900, while Hamilton Azzurri was founded in 1963 which later became Highfields Azzurri during the 1970s. In 2006, Highfields Azzurri became Azzurri FC. In 2009, Football Federation Australia forced Azzurri to change its name.

After the 2009 season, the club became Charlestown City Blues FC, when Azzurri FC and Charlestown United merged.

In 2014, Charlestown City was accepted into the National Premier Leagues Northern NSW (NPL NNSW). The Blues finished in 4th place in the first season of the NPL NNSW, qualifying for the finals series.

In October 2017, Azzurri announced the signing of former Socceroo Ljubo Milicevic.

The 2018 season saw Charlestown finish in 6th place in the league. Scott Smith and Kane Goodchild were the side's leading goalscorers with 7 goals each. The club also enjoyed FFA Cup success, progressing to the round of 32 for the first time in their history, where they were defeated by Heidelberg United. 2022 saw finals football return to Azzurri under now ex-manager Graham Law. A team led by Nigel Boogard and Taylor Regan finished 4th and fell at the hands of Newcastle Olympic in the 4th v 5th playoff game.

The club will change its name to Charlestown Azzurri for the 2020 season, and will also unveil a new crest, returning to its traditional red, white and green colours, acknowledging its Italian heritage.

2023 invited a new look for Azzurri who under new management of James Pascoe finished the season in 3rd place. After a strong start to the season, injuries and the loss of goalkeeper Nate Archibald saw Charlestown's form drop towards the end of the season. Azzurri lost to Broadmedow magic in the first round of the finals before going on to beat the Weston Bears 1-0 at their home ground (Lisle Carr). Following this Azzurri would once again face magic where they were unsuccessful resulting in the Azzurri boys falling just short of a grand final appearance.

== Current squad ==
Note: Flags indicate national team as defined under FIFA eligibility rules; some limited exceptions apply. Players may hold more than one non-FIFA nationality.

No.	Pos.	Nation	Player
—	GK		Nathan Archbold
—	CAM	AUS	Jacob Melling
—	CM		Caleb Walz
—	RB		Callum Bower
—	RW		Dean Petit
—	ST		Kyle Munns
—	GK		George Scorer
—	FW		Harrison Frendo

No.	Pos.	Nation	Player
—	CDM		Jackson Frendo
—	CDM/RB		Jethro Elkington
—	CB		Jett White
—	DF		Luke Callen
—	LW/CAM		Regan Lundy
—	ST		Rene Ferguson
—	ST		Ryan Frame
—	LW		Miguel Herrera

== Club Legends ==
- Taylor Regan (Azzurri Junior/ 2022-2023)
- Nigel Boogaard (2022–2023)
- Matthew Hoole (2025-2026)
- Kane Goodchild (legend team)
- Ljubo Milicevic (2017/18)
- Nate Archibald (hall of fame)
- Rene Ferguson (250 appearances / Hall of fame)
- Jethro Elkington (100 Appearances/ hall of fame)
- Scott Smith (most appaeances for the club)
- Neville Power (top 5 in appearances and top goalscorer for the club(223))
- Wayne Bailey (legend team)
- Victor Hogan (top 5 in appearances)
- Josh Maguire(legend team)
- Peter Fairleigh (legend team)
- Paul Wheeler (legend team)
- George Strong (legend team)
- Peter Gleeson (legend team)
- Victor Hogan (legend team)
- Mervyn Black (legend team)
- Peter Dewhurst(legend team)
- Malcolm Heath (legend team)
- Peter Irving (legend team)
- David Howells (legend team)
- David Lowe (legend team)
- Howard Tredennick (legend team)
- Ken Ledden(legend team (manager))
- Dos Santos(legend team (coach))
- Boris Bendevski(legend team)
- John Adamthwaite (legend team)
- Ethan Prestwidge (2x Rocco Miccoli Youth Defender of the year)

== Life members ==
- Antonio 'Tony' Martinelli
- Basilio Rufo
- Decimo Valentinis
- Don Di Nardo
- Elia Luvisi
- Glenn Myles
- Graham Mason
- Ken Ledden
- Rocco Miccoli
- Peter Gaddes
- Peter Sandrone
- Rene Ferguson
- Shane Tull

== Honours ==
- As Highfields Azzurri

Northern NSW Division One Premiers (1): 2009

Northern NSW NPL/NBN State League Premiers (5): 1981, 1992, 1993, 1994, 1995

Northern NSW NPL/NBN State League Champions (5): 1979, 1981, 1993, 1996, 1997

- As Charlestown Azzurri

Northern NSW NPL Women's Premiers (1): 2025

Northern NSW NPL Women's Champions (2): 2024, 2025
