= Cooks Hill United FC =

Football club in Australia

- Full name: Cooks Hill United FC
- Nickname: Cookers
- Founded: 1997
- Ground: Newcastle Athletics Field / No.2 Sportsground
- President: Mitch McPherson
- Head Coach: Jamie Dunning
- League: NPL NNSW
- 2026: 6th of 12
- Website: https://www.chufc.com.au/
| Home colours | Away colours |

Cooks Hill United FC (CHUFC) is a semi-professional football club based in Cooks Hill, New South Wales. Cooks Hill United FC currently competes in the Northern NSW Football National Premier Leagues NNSW competition; the highest division of the NNSW Football Leagues and the second tier of soccer in Australia.

Cooks Hill United's badge is a detailed, traditional crest-style emblem featuring heraldic influences and strong football and local symbolism.

Upper section: Three brick‑patterned turrets in green and gold, symbolising Australia’s national colours. At the centre is a small Phoenix rendered in red, white, and blue, referencing the earlier Cooks Hill Soccer Club of the 1970s.

Middle left quadrant: A schooner ship, representing Newcastle’s maritime heritage. Middle right quadrant: Depicts the Obelisk, a well-known Cooks Hill and Newcastle landmark. The cinnamon brown and emerald green background elements reference colours used by Newcastle KB United and the official colours of the City of Newcastle.

Lower section: Contains black‑and‑white vertical stripes representing Cooks Hill United FC, along with a stylised football reinforcing the sport and the club’s purpose.

Flanking the shield are two silver heraldic lions in traditional inward-facing poses. Above the shield is a gauntlet formed as a raised fist, with decorative green mantling flowing from it.

Two cyan‑blue banners flow beneath the shield, displaying the club’s name in white lettering and the establishment year of 1997 between them.

The club’s official colours are Black, White and Royal Blue. Black and white reference the colours of Newcastle United (England), reflecting the club founders’ original naming intention and the Royal Blue is inspired by the star featured on the Newcastle Brown Ale logo.

CHUFC's home games for NPL and Zone League are played at the Fearnley Dawes Athletics Centre and No. 2 Sportsground in the suburb of Newcastle West. Cooks Hill Juniors as well as All Age Men's, Women's, Over age divisions etc play at the original home ground of National Park No.4 Games are also played across from No.4 over Cottage Creek on National Park No.6

== History ==
In December 1997 at the Commonwealth Hotel, Cooks Hill, Cooks Hill United Football Club officially became a sporting organisation. The original intention was to name the club Newcastle United; the proposal however was rejected by the Newcastle Football Association due to naming regulations in place at the time. The name Cooks Hill United was subsequently adopted, reflecting the club’s home ground at National Park No. 4 Sportsground.

Amidst the buzz of the '98 World Cup, three All Age teams were registered in the local Newcastle competition and became the first representatives of the black & white stripes.

The 1999 season was the inaugural year for both the Cooks Hill Juniors and the Cooks Hill Women’s and in 2000 Cooks Hill FC entered the Inter District competition for the first time, competing in I.D.3's

In 2005 the Cooks Hill Women won the double and the Men were promoted to I.D.2's.

In 2010 Cooks Hill Men’s were promoted to the top Inter District competition with the full amalgamation of Cooks Hill Juniors with the Seniors occurring not long after.

The club entered the Northern League 1 Division from 2015–2021

In 2022 Cooks Hill were promoted into the NNSW National Premier League. Craig Deans was appointed Technical Director in June of this year as well.

In June 2025 CHUFC advanced to the Australia Cup Round of 32 for the first time. A 2-3 victory against Adelaide Croatia Raiders SC saw them progress to the round of 16. CHUFC faced the Newcastle Jets at No.2 Sportsground on Wed, 13 August 2025 in front of a ground record crowd of 4,256, beaten 5-0.

2026 was CHUFC's most successful NPL season yet, finishing 6th. This season also saw the club enter the new Zone League Womens competition, wining both the First Grade and Conference competitions.

== Honours ==
=== Interdistricts (ID's) ===
Grand finalists ID3's 2003 Minor Premiers & Grand finalists ID3's 2004 Grand Final winners ID1's 2010

=== Zone Premier League ===
Grand Final winners 2011 Grand Final winners 2012 Grand Finalists 2013 Grand Final winners 2014

=== Northern League 1 ===
Premiers - 2017, 2018, 2019

Champions - 2017

=== Northern NSW State Cup ===
Winners - 2025

== Australia Cup ==
| Year | | Opponent | Venue | Result |
|---|---|---|---|---|
| 2025 | Round of 32 | Adelaide Croatia | Croatian Sports Centre, Adelaide | W 2 - 3 |
| 2025 | Round of 16 | Newcastle Jets | No.2 Sportsground | L 0 - 5 |

== Coaches ==
| Seasons | Coach | Division | Honours |
|---|---|---|---|
| 2015 - 2016 | Warren Spink | Northern League 1 | |
| 2017 - 2019 | Graham Law | Northern League 1 | Premiers - 2017, 2018, 2019 Champions 2017 |
| 2020 | Doug West | Northern League 1 | |
| 2021 - 2022 | David Tanchevski | Northern League 1 / NNSW NPL | |
| 2023 - 2025 | Chris Zoricich | NNSW NPL | NNSW State Cup - 2025 |
| 2026–Present | Jamie Dunning | NNSW NPL | |

== Divisional history ==
| Seasons | Division |
|---|---|
| 2000 - 2010 | Inter District |
| 2011 - 2014 | Zone Premier League |
| 2015 - 2021 | Northern League 1 |
| 2022 - Present | NNSW NPL |

== Committee ==
- Mitch McPherson - President
- Matt Helinski - Senior Vice President (Premier Football)
- Tom Hunter-Leahy - Vice President - Junior Community Football
- Di Spurway - Secretary
- Louise Stanger - Events Coordinator and Committee Member
- John Bowlder - Treasurer
- Gabby King - Committee Member

== First team squad ==
Note: Flags indicate national team as defined under FIFA eligibility rules; some limited exceptions apply. Players may hold more than one non-FIFA nationality.

| No. | Pos. | Nation | Player |
|---|---|---|---|
| 1 | GK | AUS | Lachlan Watson |
| 67 | GK | AUS | Liam Beazley |
| 3 | DF | AUS | Patrick Bond |
| 4 | DF | AUS | Alex Gillespie |
| 5 | MF | AUS | Daniel Clements |
| 7 | FW | AUS | James Byrnes |
| 8 | MF | AUS | Ash Balcomb |
| 9 | FW | AUS | Samuel Marr |
| 10 | MF | AUS | Cody Carroll |
| 11 | FW | AUS | Nick Russell |
| 12 | DF | AUS | Boaz Moir |

| No. | Pos. | Nation | Player |
|---|---|---|---|
| 14 | DF | AUS | Jon Griffiths |
| 15 | FW | AUS | Kierry James |
| 16 | MF | AUS | Kobe Park |
| 17 | MF | AUS | Daniel Yaxley |
| 18 | DF | AUS | Liam Spurway |
| 20 | MF | AUS | Sam Anderson |
| 21 | MF | AUS | Jay Kitcher |
| 23 | DF | AUS | Tommy Smart |
| 23 | FW | AUS | Sakeel Balfour Brown |
| 33 | MF | AUS | Lachlan Pasquale |
| 64 | DF | AUS | Kevin Davison |
| — | FW | AUS | Sam Modderno |

== Life members ==
- Adrian Leonard
- Cath Howard
- Craig Heigh
- David Morley
- Di Spurway
- Jeff Evans
- Lee Bateman
- Matt Borsato
- Matthew Helinski
- Nigel Bosworth
- Pete Roworth
- Richard Howard
- Libbie Best
- Michael Best
