= Kahibah FC =

- Full name: Kahibah FC
- Nickname: Rams
- Founded: 1925
- Ground: Harold Knight Oval
- Capacity: 300
- President: Bridene Doherty
- Head Coach: Blair Newham
- League: NPL NNSW
- 2026: 11th of 12
- Website: https://www.kahibahfc.com.au/
Home colours

Kahibah Football Club (Kahibah FC) is a semi-professional football club based in Kahibah, located in the Hunter Region of New South Wales, Australia.

== History ==
Founded on Tuesday 1 July 1924, the club has a long-standing presence in the local football community.

Kahibah FC currently competes in the National Premier Leagues Northern NSW, which is the first tier of football in Northern New South Wales. The club has teams in both senior Mens including First Grade and Reserve Grade, which is the senior team made up of the top adult players and are premiers in both competitions in 2025; they also have teams in Boys Youth Competitions from Under-18s, for players aged 18 and under; through to Under 13’s. They also have teams for boys and girls in the NNSW Junior Development League boys and girls ranging from Under-12s to Under 9’s.

With a club membership of over 650 players, Kahibah FC participates in a variety of competitions across Newcastle, Lake Macquarie, and the broader Hunter Region.
