= Toronto Awaba Stags FC =

Toronto Awaba Football Club
- Full name: Toronto Awaba Football Club
- Nickname: The Stags
- Founded: 1922
- Ground: Lyall Peacock Field, Toronto
- Capacity: 3,000
- Coordinates: 33°00′39″S 151°35′21.6″E
- League: NNSW ZPL 1
Home colours	Away colours

Toronto Awaba Football Club are an Australian semi-professional association football club based in Toronto, Newcastle, Australia. The club are currently playing in the second division in the Northern New South Wales football leagues known as Northern League One. The club was relegated from the NBN State Football League at the end of the 2010 season. The club won the 2023 Northern League One premiership. After finishing last in the 2026 season the club was relegated to Zone league 1 of the NNSW football competions.

== History ==
Originally formed in 1922 by the then Awaba Cricket Club, the football team was playing on a small ground of literally dug out bush. In these times there was no change-room facilities and only local social clubs would come to play such as Barnsley and Teralba. It was now a decision was made to find a new suitable ground for the club. After this move Toronto Awaba was invited into the competition football season, in which it gained a total of 3 points in its first two seasons. However the following season in 1947 the club ran out premiers by a big margin. Although it was not until 1957 in which they were promoted to the State First Division for the first time. There the Stags have stayed tasting some success throughout their time in the State Football League.

== Club colours ==
The traditional colours of Toronto Awaba Stags FC are royal blue, gold, and white, as registered with Northern NSW Football.

== Home ground ==
Toronto Awaba play out of the Lyall Peacock Field, it is located at the corner of Cook and Thorn streets, Toronto. Lyall Peacock Field is recognisable for its grandstand on the halfway line of the field.

== Recent Seasons ==
=== 2006 to 2008 ===
The 2006, 2007 and 2008 seasons were similar, with no grades qualifying for the finals series.

- In 2006, the Senior Team finished the season in 10th position with a total of 13 points.
- In 2007, the Senior Team finished the season in 8th position with a total of 17 points.
- In 2008, the Senior Team finished the season in 9th position with a total of 15 points.

=== 2009 ===
The 2009 competition had a changed format with the total number of teams reduced to eight. Toronto Awaba was offered a place in this format and is confirmed until the 2011 season.

=== 2010 ===
The 2010 season was one of the busiest of recent history. The year started with a complete overhaul of the committee. With the new committee came a new coach. Originally chosen as Under-23s coach, Lindsay Tapp was promoted to senior coach with Mike Trebilcock, who had had years of experience as Assistant coach at Highfields Azzuri and Coach of the Edgeworth Eagles Youth Grade. Lindsay attracted mainly young players, most notably Josh Small. Tapp also brought senior players to the club, most notably Christian Okonkwo, Jason Cowburn, Sean Matthews and Scott Baillie. The team only managed 1 point whilst under Tapp's charge. Tapp was let go and Scott Baillie, former National League player and formerly player/coach of West Sydney Berries, was given charge for the rest of the season and the following season. The Stags finished last on the table, and as relegation had been reintroduced to the format of the competition they were dropped to the NEWFM First Division for 2011.

=== 2011 ===
The 2011 season was Toronto's first endeavour into the NEW FM state league in the previous five years. A complete overhaul of the playing and coaching staff enabled a fresh approach to the start of a new season, which included the signing of former Newcastle United and Newcastle Jet Stephen Eagleton as the under 23's coach and squad member of first grade. Only one player remained on the club's books from the 2010 season. Bailie's preferred 3–5–2 system was used by all three grades (U19's, 23's and First Grade). The senior team was able to qualify for the finals series (for the first time in five years) after having finished fourth in the regular standings. They lost 9–1 on aggregate to Charleston.

=== 2012 ===
The 2012 season was a season with many ups and downs for the Toronto Awaba Stags. TheSenior team finished the season in 4th position with a total of 35 points, and played in the finals serious for the second consecutive year.

=== 2015 to 2016 ===
These two seasons were tough for the Stags both on and off the field with a vast rebuilding effort undertaken. The Stags didn't achieve high results on the pitch, but did build a youth culture at the club. 2016 was the last year with Tony Jovcevski as the Senior team's coach.

== Rivalries ==
The Stags have several strong rivals across the greater Lake Macquarie region with clubs such as Lake Macquarie City Roosters FC, Westlakes Wildcats FC and Morisset Strikers FC.

== Honours ==
- NNSW State League Division 1/HIT Northern League One Premiers:

2002, 2023
