= Wallsend FC =

Wallsend Football Club
- Full name: Wallsend Football Club
- Nickname: The Red Devils
- Founded: 1887
- Ground: The Gardens Sporting Complex
- Capacity: 2,100
- Coordinates: 32°53′38″S 151°41′1″E
- President: Matthew Williams
- Coach: Chris Gallagher
- League: NNSW State League 1
- 2026: 2nd
- Website: http://wallsendfc.com.au/
Home colours

Wallsend Football Club is a football club in Australia. They play in the NNSW Northern League 1(NL1) which is the second tier of competition in Northern NSW Football. They are the oldest football club in Newcastle.

== Club ==
=== Colours ===
The original club colours consisted of a red shirt with a white sash, white shorts and red and white socks. This strip was worn by the Wallsend Rovers, the original club name in 1887. The presence of red and white has been continuous, with evolving designs and styles always involving the use of these colours.

=== Ground ===
Wallsend Football Club is based at The Gardens Sporting Complex, which was formerly used by the Newcastle Breakers until their demise. The ground has been developed into a multi-use greyhound and sports venue, not merely a site for football. The previous capacity to hold 11,000 spectators has dropped to one of 2,000, with 1,100 of those being seated.

=== Rivalries ===
Wallsend Football Club's principal rivals are the nearby clubs of West Wallsend FC and Adamstown Rosebud FC, against whom they have been playing matches for over a century.

Wallsend's nearest rival in geographic terms is the club Plattsburg Marylands FC.

== Honours ==
=== Major Premierships ===
- NEWFM Northern League One Champions: 2

2015, 2016

- State Premiers: 3

1942, 1943, 1944

- Northern Premiers: 3

1945, 1951, 1953

- State Premiership: 3

1957, 1959, 1965

- State League Premiership: 2

1932, 1933

- Northern League Premiership: 1

1929

=== Other ===
- Premiership Runners-Up: 11

1930, 1949, 1954, 1956, 1971, 1976, 1980, 1984, 1985, 1994, 1995

- Minor Premierships: 4

1951, 1965, 1985, 1994

- Club Championships: 2

1994, 2003

=== Cup wins ===
- Daniel's Cup: 16

1938, 1939, 1940, 1941, 1942, 1943, 1950, 1951, 1955, 1956, 1957, 1958, 1961, 1962, 1963, 1964

- Ellis Cup: 5

1889, 1919, 1920, 1923, 1924

- State Cup: 5

1926, 1932, 1933, 1937, 1942

- Robinson Cup: 5

1932, 1933, 1938, 1939, 1940, 1962

- Ampol Cup: 4

1960, 1961, 1963, 1964

- Richardson Cup: 3

1921, 1926, 1937

- State League Cup: 3

1944, 1950, 1957^{(1)}

- Gardiner Cup: 3

1944, 1945, 1947

- Priest Cup: 3

1943, 1944, 1945

- Sheahan Cup: 2

1938, 1941

- Northern Cup: 2

1931, 1932

- Badge Trophy: 2

1900, 1903

note (1) 1957 winner of the NSW Association State Cup, after the breakaway from the NSW Federation

== Current squad ==
As of the 2026 season

Note: Flags indicate national team as defined under FIFA eligibility rules; some limited exceptions apply. Players may hold more than one non-FIFA nationality.

No.	Pos.	Nation	Player
—		AUS	Kai Abrahams (c)
—		AUS	Jacob Hall (c)
—		AUS	Tyrell Paulson (c)
—		AUS	Sam Jones
—		AUS	Aiden Halpin
—		AUS	Cameron Davies
—		AUS	Zac Gallagher
—		AUS	Matthew Williams
—		AUS	Cody Halpin
—		AUS	Mason King
—		AUS	Bailey Ryan
—		AUS	Justin Banek
—		AUS	Ethan Kulapach
—		AUS	Hamish Meldrum
—		AUS	Ty Cousins
—		AUS	Darcy Hall
—		AUS	Blake Carter
—		AUS	Mitchell Ducks
—		AUS	Lachie Harrington
—		AUS	Logan Boland
—		AUS	Dylan Meyrick
—		AUS	Kobe Gallagher

No.	Pos.	Nation	Player
—		AUS	Riley Brent
—		AUS	Thomas Maher
—		AUS	Ethan O'Brien
—		AUS	Piaget Abayo
—		AUS	Shea Lowe
—		AUS	Daniel Kondosorov
—		AUS	Cody Hopton
—		AUS	Bodhi Ryan
—		AUS	Fraser McQueen
—		AUS	Godwill Hakim
—		AUS	Martin Okumu
—		AUS	Rhys Waters
—		AUS	Nick Hayes
—		AUS	Nick Peters
—		AUS	Jhett Hunter
—		AUS	Sotirios Moratidis
—		AUS	Ellis Abrahams
—		AUS	Marcus Kerby
—		AUS	Jackson Gosling
—		AUS	Arthur Ndayishimiye
—		AUS	Zac Donovan
—		AUS	Kruze Davidson

=== Australian representatives ===
A number of Wallsend have representational honours at various levels. In 1933 one Australian national team fielded five Wallsend players, being; C Edgetton, Winky Forrester, J Osborne, Jock Parkes, and Alf Quill. The match was played against New Zealand and ended as a draw with C Edgetton captaining the side and Alf Quill scoring both Australian goals.

- (Australia) Les Burnett
- (Australia) Reg Date
- (Australia) C Edgetton
- (Australia) Winky Forrester
- (Australia) Ron Giles
- (Australia) A Hearney
- (Australia) Ernest [Dick] Kemp
- (Australia) William [Bill] Mahoney
- (Australia) A Mascord
- (Australia) Jack O'Brien Snr
- (Australia) Jack O'Brien Jnr
- (Australia) J Osborne
- (Australia) E Owens
- (Australia) Hedley Parkes
- (Australia) Jock Parkes
- (Australia) Dan Rees
- (Australia) Alf Quill
- (Australia) Harold Whitelaw
- (Australia) Hugh Whitelaw
- (Australia) Jack Whitelaw

=== Olympians ===
The Melbourne Olympic Games of 1956 saw two representatives from Wallsend Football Club play for Australia:

- (Australia) George Arthur
- (Australia) Bruce Morrow

== Top Scorers per season ==
Year / Player	Games / Goals
2015 / David Hodgson	18 / 12
2016 / David Hodgson	22 / 17
2017 / Matthew Williams	19 / 7
2018 / Ty Goldsmith	19 / 17
2019 / Ty Goldsmith & Alex Wallace	7 / 6 & 11 / 6
2020 / Angus Hall	13 / 3
2021 / Samual Bradshaw	15 / 11
2022 / Matthew Williams	14 / 6
2023 / Matthew Williams	16 / 8
2024 / Matthew Williams	23 / 8
2025 / Bailey Ryan	18 / 13
