= South Cardiff FC =

Australian football club

South Cardiff
- Full name: South Cardiff Football Club
- Nicknames: Gunners, Southy
- Founded: 1964; 62 years ago
- Ground: Ulinga Complex
- Capacity: 350
- Coordinates: 32.956264°S 151.666667°E
- Head coach: Michael Bolch
- League: NNSW State League 1
- 2026: 9th of 10
- Website: http://www.southcardifffc.com/
Home colours	Away colours

South Cardiff Football Club is a semi-professional soccer club based in Cardiff South a suburb of Newcastle, Australia. The club was established in 1964 and currently competes in the Northern NSW State League Division 1. They are known as "The Gunners" after the nickname of London club Arsenal. The club in its current form celebrated its 50th anniversary in 2014 although there is historical records of South Cardiff Football Club back to the 1930s at least. South Cardiff was the first team to score in the Round of 32 national knockout competition the FFA CUP. In 2015, South Cardiff were relegated to the Northern NSW State League Division 1 for the 2016 season. The club's stated mission is to qualify for re-admission to the National Premier Leagues Northern NSW

In 2024 South Cardiff will field all teams from U9s to First Grade, with U13s-U18s competing in the Premier Youth League, Reserves and First Grade competing in HitFM Northern League 1 and U9s to U12s competing in Northern New South Wales Football's Junior Development Leagues.

== Ground ==
The club plays its home matches at the Ulinga Complex which is located at Cross Street Cardiff South. The Complex has four fields, two training and two match, all with floodlights for night games and training.

== Notable players ==
The club prides itself in producing players, the most notable of which is Connor Metcalfe

== Coaching staff ==
- 1st Grade Coach: Mick Bolch
- Assistant 1st Grade Coach: Chad Evans
- Reserves Coach: Richard Clemens
- Youth Technical Director: Josh Hole
- U18s Coach: Josh Hole
- U16s Coach: Clayton Brooks
- U15s Coach: Corey Anderson
- U14s Coach: Dan Gibson
- U13s Coach: Aidan Paintner
- JDL Technical Director: Aidan Paintner
- U12s Coach: Hayden Tyrell, Rhys Tyrell
- U11s Coach: Baptiste Lannuzell
- U10s Coach: Jared Boorer
- U9s Coach: Shaun King

== Club officials ==
- President: Rob Panther
- Vice-President: Darren Hall
- Treasurer: Karina Gatgens
- Secretary: Natalie Gibson

== Competition timeline ==
Season	League										Other Cups
Season	Division	Pld	W	D	L	GF	GA	+/-	Pts	Position	Other Cups
1982	Fourth Division	22	14	4	4	35	21	14	32	2nd	-
1983	Third Division	22	12	3	7	35	30	5	39	4th	–
1984	Third Division	20	8	7	5	36	24	-12	31	4th	–
1985	Third Division	22	4	4	14	24	48	-24	16	11th	–
1986	Fourth Division	18	8	3	7	35	30	5	27	5th	–
1987	Fourth Division	18	12	3	3	37	25	12	39	2nd	–
1988	Third Division	18	6	7	5	28	22	6	25	5th	–
1989	Third Division	18	7	2	9				23	7th	–
1990	Third Division	18	4	2	12				14	8th	–
1991	Third Division	18	9	6	3				33	3rd	–
1995	Second Division	14	11	3	0				36	1st	–
1996	Second Division	22	12	3	7	39	34	5	39	6th	–
1997	Second Division	20	17	1	2	63	22	41	52	1st	–
1998	State League	22	9	4	12	38	50	–12	28	9th	–
1999	State League	22	12	2	8	42	32	10	38	6th	–
2000	State League	22	9	5	8	53	49	4	32	7th	–
2001	State League	18	4	2	12	23	45	-22	14	7th	–
2002	State League	18	4	6	8	31	37	-6	18	8th	–
2003	State League	18	4	4	10	26	39	-13	16	7th	–
2004	State League	18	6	5	7	30	30	0	23	6th	–
2005	State League	18	8	5	5	43	31	10	29	3rd	–
2006	State League	18	5	3	10	21	40	-19	18	7th	–
2007	State League	18	8	4	6	28	31	-3	28	6th	–
2008	State League	18	3	5	10	24	44	-20	14	9th	–
2009	State League	21	8	6	7	29	35	-6	30	5th	–
2010	State League	21	5	7	9	25	35	-10	22	7th	–
2011	State League	21	10	3	8	32	34	-2	33	3rd	Solo Cup
2012	State League	18	8	3	7	35	29	6	27	6th	–
2013	State League	18	7	5	6	27	27	0	26	7th	–
2014	NNSW National Premier League	18	6	3	9	24	34	–10	21	7th	–
2015	NNSW National Premier League	18	2	3	13	22	48	–26	9	10th	–
2016	NewFM 1st Division	20	5	4	11	25	37	–12	19	9th	–
2017	NewFM Northern League 1	20	11	2	7	36	25	11	35	5th	–
2018	NewFM Northern League 1	20	8	5	7	43	33	10	29	5th	–
2019	NewFM Northern League 1	20	10	5	5	46	23	23	35	4th	Gallagher Shield
2020	NewFM Northern League 1*	14	4	0	10	19	25	–6	12	9th	Gallagher Shield
2021	HitFM Northern League 1*	17	2	2	13	13	55	–42	8	11th	-
2022	HitFM Northern League 1	18	4	6	8	28	44	–16	18	8th	-
2023	HitFM Northern League 1	24	8	4	12	60	66	–6	28	5th	Gallagher Shield
2024	HitFM Northern League 1	24	9	3	12	36	53	–17	30	6th	Gallagher Shield
2025	HitFM Northern League 1	18	5	5	8	24	41	–17	20	8th	Gallagher Shield
2026	HitFM Northern League 1	18	3	4	1	15	32	–17	13	8th	Gallagher Shield

|}

- Season cancelled early due to COVID-19 pandemic in Australia

== Honours ==
- Second Division Premiers: 1995, 1997
- Youth State League Premiers: 2005
- U23 NBN State League Premiers: 2012
- Solo Cup: 2011
- Gallagher Shield: 2019, 2020, 2023, 2024, 2025, 2026
- State League Grand Final Runners Up: 2005, 2011
- Northern League One Grand Final Runners Up: 2023
- U16 Premiers: 2022
- U14 Premiers: 2019
- U13 Premiers: 2019
- U18 Champions: 2024, 2025, 2026
- U16 Champions: 2022
- U15 Champions: 2018
- U14 Ghampions: 2019
- Andrew “Pecker” Janissen Memorial Cup: 2026
