= Merewether United FC =

Merewether United
- Full name: Merewether United Football Club
- Founded: 1953
- Ground: Myamblah Oval; Newcastle, NSW, Australia
- League: Northern NSW Football

Merewether United Football Club is a Newcastle Football association team in Newcastle, Australia.

== History ==
The club was founded in 1953. In 1965 it moved to its current home ground at Myamblah Crescent in Merewether. This ground was built on the remnants of the old Glebe Colliery complex, which closed in 1959 due to an industry slump.

In 2009 the club launched a team in the inaugural Northern NSW Women's Premier League, although the team was unsuccessful in making the final series. The club had a very successful 2009 year, with 16 teams going into the final series, 9 teams reaching the grand final, 7 winning grand finals and 5 teams achieving minor premierships. 2009 Minor Premier Teams were the 10B, 13C (Dom Ritter's team), All Age Women/D, 18B girls, and All Age Women/A teams.
