= Northern League One =

- Founded: 2014; 1998–2013 (as Northern First Division); 1959–1997 (as Northern Second Division)
- Country: Australia
- Number of clubs: 10
- Promotion to: NPL NNSW
- Relegation to: Zone Football League
- Domestic cup(s): National; Australia Cup; State; Northern NSW Football State Cup
- Current premiers: Lake Macquarie City (2026)

Northern League One is a semi-professional soccer league based in the Northern regions of New South Wales served as the second tier of Northern NSW men's soccer. The competition is conducted by Northern NSW Football, one of two organising bodies in New South Wales (the other being the National Premier Leagues NSW organised by Football NSW).

The league was formally known as the Northern Second Division (1959-1997) and subsequently the Northern First Division (1998-2013).

== Format ==
The competition consists of 10 teams, who each have a First grade and Reserve grade team. The regular season takes place over 18 rounds, with each team playing each other twice in a home and away format.

From 2024 promotion and relegation was reintroduced. The team in first place at the end of the league season are crowned premiers and promoted to the National Premier League (NPL). The team that finishes 11th in NPL Men’s NNSW will join the teams that finish second, third and fourth in Northern League One in a promotion/relegation play-off series to determine the 12th team in NPL Men’s NNSW.

From 2025 the team that finishes last (10th) is relegated to Zone League One, while the Zone League One champion is promoted to Northern League One with no play-off series.

== History ==
After Sydney clubs broke away from the NSW Football Association in 1958, the Northern NSW Soccer Federation was created by Newcastle and Coalfields clubs.

An 8-team Northern Division Two was established with: Austral Dutch, Courtaulds, Jesmond, Kahibah, Kurri Kurri, Weston, Whitebridge and Young Wallsend.

== Current teams ==
The following teams are competing in the 2026 season.

Club	Nickname(s)	Founded	LGA	Ground	Location	Capacity
Cessnock City	Hornets	1907	Cessnock	Turner Park	Cessnock	500
Dudley Redhead United	Thistles	1896	Lake Macquarie	Lydon Oval	Dudley	450
Lake Macquarie City	Lakes / Roosters	1912	Lake Macquarie	Macquarie Field	Speers Point	400
Newcastle Croatia		2023	Lake Macqaurie	Lake Macquarie Regional Football Facility	Speers Point	500
New Lambton FC	Eagles	1917	Newcastle	Alder Park	New Lambton	250
Singleton Strikers	Wildhogs	1978	Singleton	Howe Park	Singleton	500
South Cardiff	Gunners / Southy	1964	Lake Macquarie	Ulinga Oval	Cardiff South	500
Toronto Awaba	The Stags	1922	Lake Macquarie	Lyall Peacock Field	Toronto	500
Wallsend	Red Devils	1887	Newcastle	The Gardens	Wallsend	2,000
West Wallsend	Bluebells	1891	Lake Macquarie	Johnston Park	West Wallsend	500

== Honours ==
=== NNSW Northern League 1 ===
Season	Premiers	Champions	Score	Runners up
2026	Lake Macquarie City	No finals series Played.		
2025	Kahibah	No finals series Played.		
2024	Belmont Swansea United	No finals series Played.		
2023	Toronto-Awaba	West Wallsend	1–1 (4–2 (p))	South Cardiff
2022	New Lambton	Belmont Swansea United	2–1	New Lambton
2021	New Lambton	Not Played due to COVID-19		
2020	New Lambton	Singleton Strikers	2–0	New Lambton
2019	Cooks Hill United	Belmont Swansea United	3–2	Cooks Hill United
2018	Cooks Hill United	Belmont Swansea United	4–2	West Wallsend
2017	Cooks Hill United	Cooks Hill United	4–0	Belmont Swansea United
2016	Lake Macquarie City	Wallsend	0–0 (4–3 (p))	Belmont Swansea United
2015	Valentine	Wallsend	1–0	Valentine
2014	Maitland	Maitland	3–1 (a.e.t.)	Valentine

=== NNSW Northern First Division (1998–2013) ===
Season	Premiers	Champions	Score	Runners up
2013	Adamstown Rosebud	Adamstown Rosebud	2–1	Maitland
2012	Lambton Jaffas	Lambton Jaffas	1–0	Adamstown Rosebud
2011	Charlestown City Blues	Charlestown City Blues	1–0	Lambton Jaffas
2010	Lake Macquarie City	Charlestown City Blues	3–2	Lake Macquarie City
2009	Azzuri	Maitland	1–0	Azzuri
2008	Adamstown Rosebud	Adamstown Rosebud	1–0	Maitland
2007	West Wallsend	West Wallsend	4–1 (a.e.t.)	Lambton Jaffas
2006	Dudley Redhead	Beresfield United	1–0	Dudley Redhead
2005	Phoenix Rangers	Phoenix Rangers	3–1	West Wallsend
2004	Phoenix Rangers	Phoenix Rangers	3–1	West Wallsend
2003	Newcastle University	West Wallsend	2-Jan	Dudley Redhead
2002	Toronto-Awaba	Dudley Redhead	1–0	Toronto-Awaba
2001	Lake Macquarie City	Lake Macquarie City	2–0	Toronto-Awaba
2000	West Wallsend	West Wallsend	1–0	Medowie
1999	West Wallsend	Dudley Redhead	4–0	Budgewoi
1998	Budgewoi	Lambton Jaffas	3–1	Budgewoi

=== NNSW Northern Second Division (1959–1997) ===
Season	Premiers	Champions	Score	Runners up
1997	South Cardiff	Lambton Jaffas	2–1	South Cardiff
1996	Dudley Redhead	South Cardiff	3–2	Budgewoi
1995	South Cardiff	No Final Series		
1994	Wallsend	Wallsend	2–0	Broadmeadow Macedonia
1993	Newcastle Macedonia	Cessnock City	4–0	Belmont Swansea
1992	Cessnock City	Singleton Strikers	1–0	Stockton
1991	Hamilton Olympic	Hamilton Olympic	0–0 (3–0 (p))	Lambton Jaffas
1990	Newcastle Croatia	Lambton Jaffas	0–0 (4–3 (p))	Newcastle Croatia
1989	Edgeworth Eagles	Edgeworth Eagles	3–2	Belmont
1988	Cessnock City	Cessnock City	1–0	Newcastle Macedonia
1987	Stockton	Cessnock City	1–0	Stockton
1986	Stockton	Cessnock City	3–0	Belmont
1985	Wallsend	Belmont	1–0	Wallsend
1984	Austral United	Austral United	2–0	Wallsend
1983	Cardiff	Cardiff	3–0	Austral United
1982	Doyalson-Wyee RSL	Cardiff		Doyalson-Wyee RSL
1981	Austral United	Austral United	4–1	Doyalson-Wyee RSL
1980	Dudley Redhead United	Beresfield United	6–1	Belmont
1979	Hamilton Red Star	West Lakes	4–3	Hamilton Red Star
1978	Belmont Swansea United	Belmont Swansea United	1–0	Belmont
1977	Cessnock City	Belmont Swansea United		Cessnock City
1976	Central Coast United			
1975	Maitland	Central Coast United	3–2	Maitland
1974	Charlestown United	Maitland		Charlestown United
1973	Edgeworth Eagles	Kotara South	2–1	Edgeworth Eagles
1972	Mayfield United	Mayfield United	3–1	Cessnock City
1971	New Lambton South	Mayfield United	2–0	New Lambton South
1970	Maitland	Maitland	2–1	Charlestown RSL
1969	Maitland	Maitland	2–1	Mayfield United
1968	Cardiff	Cardiff	2–1	Cessnock City
1967	New Lambton South	Mayfield United		New Lambton South
1966	Belmont Swansea United			
1965	Hamilton Azzuri	Slavia United	3–2	Hamilton Azzuri
1964	Weston Bears	Weston Bears	2–1	Dudley Redhead
1963	Jesmond	Mayfield United	7–2	Jesmond
1962	Maitland	Whitebridge	2–0 (a.e.t.)	Maitland
1961	Merewether Advance	Merewether Advance	6–4	Jesmond
1960	Jesmond			
1959	Whitebridge	Kahibah	2–1	Young Wallsend

=== Titles ===
Premiers		Champions	
Maitland	5	Belmont Swansea United	5
Lake Macquarie City	4	Maitland	5
Belmont Swansea United	3	Cessnock City	4
Cessnock City	3	Lambton Jaffas	4
Cooks Hill United	3	Mayfield United	4
New Lambton	3	West Wallsend	4
West Wallsend	3	Cardiff	3
Adamstown Rosebud	2	Wallsend	3
Austral United	2	Adamstown Rosebud	2
Cardiff	2	Austral United	2
Dudley Redhead	2	Beresfield United	2
Edgeworth Eagles	2	Charlestown City Blues	2
Jesmond	2	Dudley Redhead	2
New Lambton South	2	Phoenix Rangers	2
Phoenix Rangers	2	Singleton Strikers	2
South Cardiff	2	Belmont	1
Stockton	2	Central Coast United	1
Toronto-Awaba	2	Cooks Hill United	1
Wallsend	2	Edgeworth	1
Azzuri	1	Hamilton Olympic	1
Budgewoi	1	Kahibah	1
Central Coast United	1	Kotara South	1
Charlestown City Blues	1	Lake Macquarie City	1
Charlestown United	1	Merewether Advance	1
Doyalson-Wyee RSL	1	Slavia United	1
Dudley Redhead United	1	South Cardiff	1
Hamilton Azzurri	1	West Lakes	1
Hamilton Olympic	1	Weston Bears	1
Hamilton Red Star	1	Whitebridge	1
Kahibah	1		
Lambton Jaffas	1		
Mayfield United	1		
Merewether Advance	1		
Newcastle Croatia	1		
Newcastle Macedonia	1		
Newcastle University	1		
Valentine	1		
Weston Bears	1		
Whitebridge	1		

== See also ==
- Northern Inland Football
