= 2015 FFA Cup preliminary rounds =

Qualification rounds for 2015 season of Australian soccer competition

Tournament details
- Country: Australia
- Teams: 648

The 2015 FFA Cup preliminary rounds were a qualifying football competition in Australia to decide 21 of the 32 teams which will take part in the 2015 FFA Cup Round of 32, along with the 10 A-League clubs and reigning National Premier Leagues champion (North Eastern MetroStars SC). The preliminary rounds operated within a consistent national structure whereby club entry into the competition was staggered in each state/territory, with the winning clubs from Round 7 of the preliminary rounds in each member federation gaining direct entry into the Round of 32. All Australian clubs were eligible to enter the qualifying process through their respective FFA member federation, however only one team per club was permitted entry in the competition. Teams from the Northern Territory competed in this competition for the first time.

== Schedule ==
The number of fixtures for each round, and the match dates for each Federation, are as follows.

Round	Number of fixtures	Clubs	ACT	NSW	NNSW	NT	QLD	SA	TAS	VIC	WA
Qualifying round	11 + 17 byes	648 → 637	–	–	–	–	–	–	–	14 Feb	–
First round	57 + 13 byes	637 → 580	–	–	21 Feb–22 Mar	–	28 Feb–11 Mar	–	–	20–25 Feb	–
Second round	106 + 15 byes	580 → 474	–	–	13 Feb–29 Mar	–	13 Feb–8 Apr	–	–	27 Feb–1 Mar	14–15 Mar
Third round	153 + 54 byes	474 → 321	14–15 Apr	14–15 Mar	14 Feb–24 Apr	28 Mar–15 Apr	3 Mar–24 Apr	4 Apr	9 Mar	6–9 Mar	28–29 Mar
Fourth round	147 + 1 byes	321 → 174	28 Apr–12 May	1–22 Apr	21 Feb–6 May	21–29 Apr	22 Feb–13 May	24–25 Apr	6 Apr	13–15 Mar	6 Apr
Fifth round	80 + 4 byes	174 → 95	19–26 May	15–28 Apr	15 Apr–16 May	19–20 May	28 Mar–9 Jun	8–12 May	17–18 Apr	2 Apr–5 May	27 Apr
Sixth round	42	95 → 53	3–10 Jun	29 Apr–6 May	20 Jun	16 Jun	19 May–20 Jun	26–27 May	2 May	5–8 Jun	1 Jun
Seventh round	21	53 → 32	20 Jun	12–13 May	21 Jun	27 Jun	7–27 Jun	28 Jun	8 Jun	17–24 Jun	20–21 Jun

- Updated from the FFA Cup Website. Round dates in the respective Federations overlapped due to separate scheduling of geographic zones.

== Format ==
The preliminary rounds structure were as follows, and refer to the different levels in the unofficial Australian soccer league system :

- Qualifying round:

- 39 Victorian clubs level 8 and below entered this stage.

- First round:

- 19 Northern New South Wales clubs level 3 and below (North Zone) entered this stage. For Northern NSW, the preliminary rounds would go straight to a penalty shootout in the event that the game is tied at the conclusion of the regular 90 minutes.
- 20 Queensland clubs level 3 and below entered this stage.
- 88 Victorian clubs (28 from the previous round and 60 level 6–7) entered this stage.

- Second round:

- 56 Northern New South Wales clubs (10 from the previous round and 46 level 3 and below) entered this stage.
- 68 Queensland clubs (16 from the previous round and 52 level 5–7 entered this stage.
- 80 Victorian clubs (44 from the previous round and 36 level 5–6) entered this stage.
- 23 Western Australian clubs level 6 and below entered this stage.

- Third round:

- 10 Australian Capital Territory clubs level 3 and below entered this stage.
- 80 New South Wales clubs level 4 and below entered this stage.
- 43 Northern New South Wales clubs (30 from the previous round and 13 level 2 and below) entered this stage.
- 10 Northern Territory clubs level 2 and below entered this stage.
- 74 Queensland clubs (36 from the previous round and 38 level 5–7 entered this stage.
- 28 South Australian clubs level 2 and below (plus North Eastern MetroStars as 2014 NPL Champion) entered this stage.
- 8 Tasmanian clubs level 3 entered this stage.
- 64 Victorian clubs (40 from the previous round and 24 level 4) entered this stage.
- 42 Western Australia clubs (15 from the previous round and 27 level 3–5) entered this stage.

- Fourth round:

- 14 Australian Capital Territory clubs (7 from the previous round and 7 level 2) entered this stage.
- 80 New South Wales clubs (56 from the previous round and 24 level 2–3) entered this stage.
- 23 Northern New South Wales clubs progressed to this stage.
- 8 Northern Territory clubs progressed to this stage.
- 42 Queensland clubs (38 from the previous round and 4 level 5–7 entered this stage.
- 15 South Australian clubs (plus North Eastern MetroStars) progressed to this stage.
- 16 Tasmanian clubs (6 from the previous round and 10 level 2–3) entered this stage.
- 64 Victorian clubs (32 from the previous round and 32 level 2–3) entered this stage.
- 32 Western Australian clubs (21 from the previous round and 11 level 2) entered this stage.

- Fifth round:

- 8 Australian Capital Territory clubs (7 from the previous round and 1 level 2) entered this stage.
- 40 New South Wales clubs progressed to this stage.
- 12 Northern New South Wales clubs progressed to this stage.
- 8 Northern Territory clubs (4 from the previous round and 4 level 2) entered this stage.
- 32 Queensland clubs (21 from the previous round and 11 level 2) entered this stage.
- 7 South Australian clubs (plus North Eastern MetroStars) progressed to this stage.
- 8 Tasmanian clubs progressed to this stage.
- 32 Victorian clubs progressed to this stage.
- 16 Western Australian clubs progressed to this stage.

- Byes – 4 NNSW clubs (4 from the South Zone)

- Sixth round:

- 4 Australian Capital Territory clubs progressed to this stage.
- 20 New South Wales clubs progressed to this stage.
- 8 Northern New South Wales clubs progressed to this stage.
- 4 Northern Territory clubs progressed to this stage.
- 4 South Australian clubs progressed to this stage.
- 16 Queensland clubs progressed to this stage.
- 4 Tasmanian clubs progressed to this stage.
- 16 Victorian clubs progressed to this stage.
- 8 Western Australian clubs progressed to this stage.

- Seventh round:

- 2 Australian Capital Territory clubs progressed to this stage. This was also the Final of the Federation Cup.
- 10 New South Wales clubs progressed to this stage. The 5 winners also participated in the Waratah Cup.
- 4 Northern New South Wales clubs progressed to this stage.
- 2 Northern Territory clubs progressed to this stage – the winners of the Darwin-based and Alice Springs-based knockout competitions.
- 8 Queensland clubs progressed to this stage. The 2 Brisbane zone teams (not including the NPL Queensland teams) also played in the Final of the Canale Cup.
- 2 South Australian clubs progressed to this stage. This was also the Grand Final of the Federation Cup.
- 2 Tasmanian clubs progressed to this stage. This was also the Grand Final of the Milan Lakoseljac Cup.
- 8 Victorian clubs progressed to this stage. The 4 winners also qualified to the semi-finals of the Dockerty Cup.
- 4 Western Australian clubs progressed to this stage. The 2 winners will also play in the Cool Ridge Cup Final.

=== Other qualification issues ===
- North Eastern MetroStars also participated in some of the South Australian qualifying rounds, which were also part of the FFSA Federation Cup competition. MetroStars were not counted as a qualifier, as they had already qualified into the FFA Cup as 2014 National Premier Leagues champions.

== Key to abbreviations ==
Federation	Zone
ACT = Australian Capital Territory	
NSW = New South Wales	
NNSW = Northern New South Wales	FNC = Far North Coast; MNC = Mid North Coast; NC = North Coast; NI = Northern Inland; NTH = North (generally); STH = South
NT = Northern Territory	ASP = Alice Springs; DAR = Darwin
QLD = Queensland	BNE = Brisbane; CQ = Central Queensland; FNQ = Far North Queensland; GC = Gold Coast; MRF = Mackay Regional Football; NQ = North Queensland; SC = Sunshine Coast; SQL = South Queensland (generally); SWQ = South West Queensland; WB = Wide Bay
SA = South Australia	
TAS = Tasmania	
VIC = Victoria	
WA = Western Australia	GLD = Goldfields; MW = Mid West

== Qualifying round ==
Fed	Zone	Tie no	Home team (Tier)	Score	Away team (Tier)
Victoria
VIC	–	1	Marcellin Old Collegians (8)	w/o	Lilydale Eagles (8)
VIC	–	2	Mt Lilydale Old Collegians (8)	2–1	Baxter SC (8)
VIC	–	3	Sporting Carlton (8)	w/o	Parkmore SC (8)
VIC	–	4	Healesville (8)	3–5	Keon Park (8)
VIC	–	5	Mitchell Rangers (8)	2–1	Prahran City (8)

Fed	Zone	Tie no	Home team (Tier)	Score	Away team (Tier)
VIC	–	6	Rosebud Heart (8)	4–3	Old Ivanhoe Grammarians (8)
VIC	–	7	Kyneton District (8)	w/o	Light United (8)
VIC	–	8	Cobram Roar (9)	2–1	Glen Waverley (8)
VIC	–	9	Balmoral (8)	0–5	Kings Domain (8)
VIC	–	10	Gisborne SC (8)	1–2	Old Trinity Grammarians (8)
VIC	–	11	Montrose SC (8)	0–3	Lara SC (8)

Notes:

- w/o = Walkover
- VIC Byes – Albert Park (8), Brandon Park (8), Casey Panthers (8), Chelsea FC (8), East Bentleigh (8), Harrisfield Hurricanes (8), Maidstone United (10), Melbourne Lions (8), Mill Park (8), Reservoir Yeti (8), RMIT FC (8), Spring Hills (8), Springvale City (8), St Kevins Old Boys (8), Swinburne University (8), White Star Dandenong (8) and Yarra Jets (8).

== First round ==
Fed	Zone	Tie no	Home team (Tier)	Score	Away team (Tier)
Northern New South Wales
NNSW	NI	1	Gunnedah United (4)	2–3	North Armidale (4)
NNSW	NI	2	Inverell Joeys (4)	3–3†	South Armidale United (4)
South Armidale United advance 4–3 on penalties.
NNSW	NI	3	The Armidale School (5)	0–2	Tamworth (4)
NNSW	NI	4	East Armidale (4)	1–3	Oxley Vale Attunga (4)
NNSW	NI	5	North Companions (4)	2–1	Demon Knights (4)
NNSW	NC	6	Maclean (4)	1–0	Coffs Coast Tigers (4)
NNSW	NC	7	Boambee (4)	8–0	Woolgoolga United (4)
NNSW	NC	8	Coffs City United (4)	2–2†	Northern Storm Thunder (4)
Coffs City United advance 5–4 on penalties.
NNSW	NC	9	Nambucca Strikers (5)	6–3	Westlawn Tigers (4)
Queensland
QLD	NQ	10	Rebels Gunners (3)	3–1	Burdekin FC (3)
QLD	NQ	11	Ross River (3)	0–2	Ingham FC (3)
QLD	SC	12	Maroochydore (3)	5–1	Woombye Snakes (3)
QLD	SC	13	Gympie Diggers (3)	1–9	Caboolture Sports (3)
Victoria
VIC	–	14	Kyneton District (8)	0–8	Eltham Redbacks (7)
VIC	–	15	Cobram Roar (9)	5–1	St Kevins Old Boys (8)
VIC	–	16	Whitehorse United (7)	6–1	Old Mentonians (8)
VIC	–	17	Yarra Jets (8)	0–2	Mt Lilydale Old Collegians (8)
VIC	–	18	Sandown Lions (7)	3–4	Lyndale United (7)
VIC	–	19	Mill Park (8)	2–2†	Rowville Eagles (7)
Mill Park advance 4–3 on penalties.
VIC	–	20	Watsonia Heights (7)	1–2	Melton Phoenix (7)
VIC	–	21	Waverley Wanderers (7)	2–2†	Altona North (7)
Waverley Wanderers advance 4–2 on penalties.
VIC	–	22	Old Trinity Grammarians (8)	4–0	Maidstone United (10)
VIC	–	23	Dandenong Wolves (7)	w/o	Bundoora United (7)
VIC	–	24	Epping City (7)	7–2	Melbourne Lions (8)
VIC	–	25	Skye United (7)	w/o	Heidelberg Eagles (7)
VIC	–	26	Keon Park (8)	w/o	Springvale City (8)
VIC	–	27	Plenty Valley Lions (7)	w/o	Point Cook (7)
VIC	–	28	Old Camberwell Grammarians (7)	0–3	Melbourne City (7)

Fed	Zone	Tie no	Home team (Tier)	Score	Away team (Tier)
VIC	–	29	Mazenod United (6)	2–2†	Sebastapol Vikings (7)
Mazenod United advance 6–5 on penalties.
VIC	–	30	Harrisfield Hurricanes (8)	w/o	Collingwood City (7)
VIC	–	31	Laverton Park (7)	4–1	Northern United (7)
VIC	–	32	Casey Panthers (8)	3–4	Noble Park (7)
VIC	–	33	Whittlesea United (6)	4–1	Swinburne University (8)
VIC	–	34	Parkmore SC (8)	w/o	Meadow Park (7)
VIC	–	35	Hoppers Crossing (6)	3–0	Newmarket Phoenix (7)
VIC	–	36	Monash University (7)	2–3†	Surf Coast (7)
VIC	–	37	Hampton Park United (7)	3–1	Bell Park (7)
VIC	–	38	West Preston (7)	1–2	Kings Domain (8)
VIC	–	39	Chelsea FC (8)	1–6	Dandenong South (7)
VIC	–	40	Keysborough (7)	2–4	Fawkner SC (7)
VIC	–	41	Reservoir Yeti (8)	1–2	Albert Park (8)
VIC	–	42	Brimbank Stallions (7)	6–3	Old Xaverians (7)
VIC	–	43	FC Strathmore (7)	2–1	Ashburton United (6)
VIC	–	44	RMIT FC (8)	2–2†	Croydon City Arrows (6)
RMIT FC advance 5–4 on penalties.
VIC	–	45	Rosebud Heart (8)	w/o	St Kilda SC (6)
VIC	46	Ringwood City (7)	1–2	Northern Falcons (7)	
VIC	–	47	Elwood City (7)	0–5	Keilor Wolves (7)
VIC	–	48	Brandon Park (8)	0–2	Darebin United (6)
Darebin United removed from competition for fielding ineligible players.
VIC	–	49	North City Wolves (6)	w/o	Brunswick Zebras (6)
VIC	–	50	Lara SC (8)	2–1	Greenvale United (7)
VIC	–	51	Endeavour United (7)	0–2	Maribyrnong Greens (7)
VIC	–	52	Endeavour Hills (7)	w/o	Williamstown SC (6)
VIC	–	53	Truganina Hornets (7)	6–1	Marcellin Old Collegians (8)
VIC	–	54	Brighton SC (7)	3–1	Mitchell Rangers (8)
VIC	–	55	Bayside Argonauts (7)	w/o	Spring Hills (8)
VIC	–	56	East Bentleigh (8)	0–5	South Yarra (6)
VIC	–	57	White Star Dandenong (8)	2–4	Upfield SC (6)

Notes:

- w/o = Walkover
- † = After Extra Time
- NNSW Byes – Urunga FC (4).
- QLD Byes – Beerwah Glasshouse United (3), Brothers Townsville FC (3), Buderim Wanderers (3), Caloundra FC (3), Coolum FC (3), Estates FC (4), Kawana SC (3), MA Olympic (3), Noosa Lions (3), Saints Eagles South (3), Townsville Warriors (3) and Wulguru United (3).

== Second round ==
Fed	Zone	Tie no	Home team (Tier)	Score	Away team (Tier)
Northern New South Wales
NNSW	NI	1	North Armidale (4)	2–2†	South Armidale United (4)
South Armidale United advance 2–1 on penalties.
NNSW	NI	2	Tamworth (4)	0–3	Oxley Vale Attunga (4)
NNSW	NC	3	Maclean (4)	1–5	Boambee (4)
NNSW	NC	4	Coffs City United (4)	1–1†	Urunga (4)
Coffs City United advance 7–6 on penalties.
NNSW	FNC	5	Ballina SC (4)	0–3	Lismore Thistles (4)
NNSW	FNC	6	Goonellabah (4)	2–1	Lismore Workers (4)
NNSW	FNC	7	Lennox Head (4)	1–3	Alstonville (4)
NNSW	STH	8	Belmont Swansea United (3)	0–1	Swansea (4)
NNSW	STH	9	Newcastle University (4)	3–2	Wallsend (3)
NNSW	STH	10	Cooks Hill United (3)	2–0	Barnsley United (4)
NNSW	STH	11	Westlakes Wildcats (5)	1–9	Kahibah (3)
NNSW	STH	12	Plattsburg Maryland (6)	3–0	Cardiff City (4)
NNSW	STH	13	New Lambton Eagles (4)	1–1†	New Lambton (7)
New Lambton Eagles advance 5–4 on penalties.
NNSW	STH	14	Merewether Advance (6)	1–7	Kotara South (5)
NNSW	STH	15	Beresfield United (4)	10–0	Warners Bay (5)
NNSW	STH	16	Toronto Awaba (3)	3–0	Garden Suburb (4)
NNSW	STH	17	Stockton Sharks (5)	0–3	Dudley Redhead Senior (4)
NNSW	STH	18	Valentine FC (3)	8–3	Lake Macquarie City (3)
NNSW	STH	19	Kurri Kurri (6)	5–0	Mayfield United Junior (7)
NNSW	STH	20	Hunter Simba (6)	5–4	Morisset United (5)
NNSW	STH	21	Beresfield (5)	0–2	West Wallsend (3)
NNSW	STH	22	Muswellbrook (6)	0–12	Singleton Strikers (3)
NNSW	STH	23	Charlestown Junior (5)	3–2	RAAF Williamtown (7)
NNSW	STH	24	Mayfield United Senior (4)	17–1	Dudley Redhead United (7)
NNSW	STH	25	Tenambit Sharks (6)	3–5	Medowie (6)
NNSW	STH	26	Thornton Redbacks (3)	5–2	Cessnock City (3)
Queensland
QLD	BNE	27	Western Spirit (5)	1–4	Centenary Stormers (5)
QLD	BNE	28	Souths United (5)	4–0	Acacia Ridge (6)
QLD	BNE	29	Virginia United (6)	3–1	Logan City (7)
QLD	BNE	30	Samford Rangers (6)	2–1	Logan Village (7)
QLD	BNE	31	Mooroondu (7)	3–0	Ridge Hills United (6)
QLD	BNE	32	Oxley United (5)	1–2	Bardon Latrobe (7)
QLD	BNE	33	Westside (5)	3–0	Clairvaux (6)
QLD	BNE	34	New Farm United (6)	2–1	Ipswich City (5)
QLD	BNE	35	The Gap (5)	6–2	AC Carina (6)
QLD	BNE	36	Kangaroo Point Rovers (5)	0–4	Slacks Creek (6)
QLD	BNE	37	Jimboomba United (6)	3–1†	North Brisbane (8)
QLD	BNE	38	Pine Hills (5)	5–1	Greenbank (7)
QLD	BNE	39	Toowong FC (6)	0–3	Newmarket (5)
QLD	BNE	40	Tarragindi Tigers (6)	1–3	Redcliffe PCYC (5)
QLD	BNE	41	Narangba United (6)	1–3†	Park Ridge (5)
QLD	FNQ	42	Southside Comets (3)	2–1	Innisfail United (3)
QLD	FNQ	43	Leichhardt Lions (3)	0–3	Edge Hill United (3)
QLD	NQ	44	Brothers Townsville (3)	5–1	Wulguru United (3)
QLD	NQ	45	Ingham FC (3)	2–5	Townsville Warriors (3)
QLD	NQ	46	Rebels Gunners (3)	3–2	Saints Eagles South (3)
QLD	NQ	47	MA Olympic (3)	7–1	Estates FC (4)
QLD	SC	48	Coolum FC (3)	0–5	Kawana SC (3)
QLD	SC	49	Noosa Lions (3)	11–1	Beerwah Glasshouse United (3)
QLD	SC	50	Maroochydore (3)	6–0	Caloundra FC (3)
QLD	SC	51	Caboolture Sports (3)	1–2†	Buderim Wanderers (3)
QLD	GC	52	Murwillumbah SC (3)	3–1	Surfers Paradise Apollo (3)
QLD	GC	53	Mudgeeraba SC (3)	3–0	Coomera Colts (3)

Fed	Zone	Tie no	Home team (Tier)	Score	Away team (Tier)
QLD	GC	54	Tugun Jets (4)	0–8	Magic United (4)
QLD	SWQ	55	St Albans (3)	4–1	University of Southern Queensland (3)
QLD	SWQ	56	Warwick Wanderers (3)	6–0	Kingaroy SC (6)
QLD	SWQ	57	South Toowoomba Hawks (3)	1–3†	West Wanderers United (3)
QLD	SWQ	58	Gatton (3)	1–6	Willowburn (3)
Victoria
VIC	–	59	Geelong SC (5)	5–0	Waverley Wanderers (7)
VIC	–	60	Old Melburnians (6)	5–1	Mt Lilydale Old Collegians (8)
VIC	–	61	Bundoora United (7)	0–2	Riversdale SC (6)
VIC	–	62	Lara SC (8)	1–4	Old Carey (6)
VIC	–	63	Brandon Park (8)	1–3	Brimbank Stallions (7)
VIC	–	64	Laverton Park (7)	0–7	Eltham Redbacks (7)
VIC	–	65	Doveton (5)	1–3†	Yarraville (5)
VIC	–	66	Spring Hills (8)	2–3†	Hampton Park United (7)
VIC	–	67	Sandringham (6)	2–0	Williamstown SC (6)
VIC	–	68	Mooroolbark (5)	0–1	Mazenod United (6)
VIC	–	69	Keilor Wolves (7)	1–0	Westvale (5)
VIC	–	70	Lalor United (6)	0–3	Caulfield United Cobras (6)
VIC	–	71	Hoppers Crossing (6)	7–0	Epping City (7)
VIC	–	72	Skye United (7)	1–3†	Brighton SC (7)
VIC	–	73	North Caulfield (5)	1–0	Albert Park (8)
VIC	–	74	Sporting Whittlesea (5)	5–2	Noble Park (7)
VIC	–	75	RMIT FC (8)	3–8	Geelong Rangers (6)
VIC	–	76	Truganina Hornets (7)	1–0	Melbourne University (5)
VIC	–	77	Lyndale United (7)	2–4	Kings Domain (8)
VIC	–	78	Cobram Roar (9)	w/o	Fitzroy City (5)
VIC	–	79	Seaford United (5)	3–0	Upfield SC (6)
VIC	–	80	Point Cook (7)	6–3†	Mill Park (8)
VIC	–	81	St Kilda SC (6)	2–0	South Yarra (6)
VIC	–	82	East Brighton United (6)	1–6	Knox City (6)
VIC	–	83	FC Strathmore (7)	0–1	Berwick City (5)
VIC	–	84	Moreland United (5)	w/o	Banyule City (5)
VIC	–	85	Old Trinity Grammarians (8)	0–1	Heidelberg Stars (5)
VIC	–	86	Keon Park (8)	1–9	Heatherton United (5)
VIC	–	87	Maribyrnong Greens (7)	9–0	Parkmore SC (8)
VIC	–	88	Peninsula Strikers (5)	0–1	Fawkner SC (7)
VIC	–	89	Whittlesea United (6)	1–0	Dingley Stars (5)
VIC	–	90	Harrisfield Hurricanes (8)	2–4†	Old Scotch (5)
VIC	–	91	Dandenong South (7)	1–5†	Melton Phoenix (7)
VIC	–	92	North City Wolves (6)	1–3	Beaumaris (5)
VIC	–	93	Altona City (6)	7–2	Surf Coast (7)
VIC	–	94	Monbulk Rangers (6)	6–1	La Trobe University (5)
VIC	–	95	Hume United (5)	2–3	Whitehorse United (7)
VIC	–	96	Northern Falcons (7)	0–6	Essendon Royals (6)
VIC	–	97	Middle Park (6)	0–1	Western Eagles (6)
VIC	–	98	Melbourne City (7)	1–3	Essendon United (6)
Western Australia
WA	MW	99	Batavia United (5)	0–3	Chapman Athletic (5)
WA	MW	100	Geraldton Rovers (5)	1–3	Olympic Heat (5)
WA	GLD	101	Twin City Saints (5)	2–1	Boulder City (5)
WA	–	102	Bunbury Dynamos (5)	7–2	Albany Bayswater (5)
WA	–	103	North Lake (6)	5–0	La Fiamma (7)
WA	–	104	Margaret River (5)	0–2	Jaguar FC (7)
WA	–	105	Challenger FC (8)	0–14	Ballajura AFC (7)
WA	–	106	Cracovia White Eagles (8)	4–2	Carramar FC (7)

Notes:

- w/o = Walkover
- † = After Extra Time
- NNSW Byes – Nambucca Strikers (5), Newcastle Suns (4), Northern Companions (4) and Jesmond FC (5).
- QLD Byes – Brighton Bulldogs (7), Broadbeach United (3), Mareeba United (3) and Stratford Dolphins (3).
- WA Byes – Backpackers FC (8), Busselton SC (5), East Fremantle (5), Eaton Dardanup (6), Emerald FC (10), Maccabi (6) and Perth Saints (5).

== Third round ==
Fed	Zone	Tie no	Home team (Tier)	Score	Away team (Tier)
Australian Capital Territory
ACT	–	1	Brindabella Blues (6)	2–1	Goulburn Strikers (4)
ACT	–	2	Canberra City (4)	2–9	ANU FC (3)
ACT	–	3	Narrabundah FC (3)	5–2	O'Connor Knights (3)
New South Wales
NSW	–	4	Hawkesbury City (4)	7–0	West Ryde Rovers (7)
NSW	–	5	Western Condors (5)	4–0	Mosman FC (6)
NSW	–	6	Pagewood Botany (6)	1–4	North Sydney United (6)
NSW	–	7	Hurstville Glory (6)	2–1	Pendle Hill (7)
NSW	–	8	Coogee United (6)	1–0	Hills Pumas (6)
NSW	–	9	Kellyville Kolts (6)	0–3	Northbridge FC (4)
NSW	–	10	Woonona FC (6)	2–1†	Southern and Ettalong United (6)
NSW	–	11	Nepean FC (4)	1–0	Forest Rangers (7)
NSW	–	12	Berkeley Vale (6)	1–3	Granville Rage (4)
NSW	–	13	Dapto Dandaloo Fury (6)	2–1	Pennant Hills (6)
NSW	–	14	Port Kembla (6)	8–0	Callala Brumbies (6)
NSW	–	15	Loftus Yarrawarrah Rovers (6)	0–2	Wagga City Wanderers (5)
NSW	–	16	Waverley Old Boys (6)	4–1	Putney Rangers (7)
NSW	–	17	Camden Tigers (5)	1–3	Dunbar Rovers (5)
NSW	–	18	Como West Jannali (6)	2–0	St Marys Convent (6)
NSW	–	19	Panania RSL (6)	2–4	Leichhardt Saints (6)
NSW	–	20	Banksia Tigers (6)	0–1	Prospect United (5)
NSW	–	21	Arncliffe Aurora (6)	2–0	Gladesville Ryde Magic (4)
NSW	–	22	Toongabbie Demons (6)	1–2†	St Clair United (6)
NSW	–	23	Western NSW Mariners (4)	4–1	Doonside Hawks (6)
NSW	–	24	Hurstville ZFC (5)	1–0	Manly Vale FC (6)
NSW	–	25	University of NSW (5)	1–4	Auburn FC (6)
NSW	–	26	Stanmore Hawks (4)	4–1	Minto District (6)
NSW	–	27	Lilli Pilli (6)	4–0	FC Gazy Lansvale (5)
Northern New South Wales
NNSW	MNC	28	Macleay Valley Rangers (4)	3–2	Port Saints (4)
NNSW	MNC	29	Taree Wildcats (4)	2–2†	Tuncurry Forster (4)
Tuncurry Forster advance 4–2 on penalties.
NNSW	NI	30	Northern Companions (4)	1–1†	Oxley Vale Attunga (4)
Northern Companions advance 4–3 on penalties.
NNSW	NC	31	Nambucca Strikers (5)	0–11	Coffs City United (4)
NNSW	FNC	32	Lismore Thistles (4)	2–2†	Goonellabah (4)
Goonellabah advance 6–5 on penalties.
NNSW	STH	33	Swansea (4)	0–6	Broadmeadow Magic (2)
NNSW	STH	34	Newcastle University (4)	2–2†	Weston Workers Bears (2)
Weston Workers Bears advance 4–3 on penalties.
NNSW	STH	35	Cooks Hill United (3)	0–8	Maitland FC (2)
NNSW	STH	36	Kahibah (3)	0–3	South Cardiff (2)
NNSW	STH	37	Plattsburg Maryland (6)	0–15	Charlestown City Blues (2)
NNSW	STH	38	New Lambton Eagles (4)	0–11	Edgeworth FC (2)
NNSW	STH	39	Kotara South (5)	1–4	Adamstown Rosebud (2)
NNSW	STH	40	Beresfield United (4)	2–8	Lambton Jaffas (2)
NNSW	STH	41	Newcastle Suns (4)	0–5	Hamilton Olympic (2)
NNSW	STH	42	Toronto Awaba (3)	1–3	Jesmond FC (5)
NNSW	STH	43	Dudley Redhead Senior (4)	1–10	Valentine FC (3)
NNSW	STH	44	Kurri Kurri (6)	3–7	Hunter Simba (6)
NNSW	STH	45	West Wallsend (3)	3–2	Singleton Strikers (3)
NNSW	STH	46	Charlestown Junior (5)	0–5	Mayfield United Senior (4)
NNSW	STH	47	Medowie (6)	0–12	Thornton Redbacks (3)
Northern Territory
NT	DAR	48	Casuarina FC (2)	4–1	Shamrock Rovers Darwin (3)
NT	DAR	49	Darwin Olympic (2)	3–2†	University Azzurri (3)
Queensland
QLD	BNE	50	Grange Thistle (4)	0–3	Rochedale Rovers (3)
QLD	BNE	51	Westside (6)	1–4	Bayside United (4)
QLD	BNE	52	WDSC Wolves (3)	0–1	Pine Hills (4)
QLD	BNE	53	Holland Park Hawks (4)	0–1	Queensland Lions (3)
QLD	BNE	54	Capalaba (3)	2–4	Virginia United (6)
QLD	BNE	55	Taringa Rovers (4)	4–2	Brisbane Knights (5)
QLD	BNE	56	Brighton Bulldogs (7)	4–1	Bardon Latrobe (7)
QLD	BNE	57	New Farm United (6)	1–2	Mount Gravatt Hawks (4)
QLD	BNE	58	Moggill (4)	4–2	Logan Lightning (3)
QLD	BNE	59	Centenary Stormers (5)	4–1	Mooroondu (7)
QLD	BNE	60	Southside Eagles (4)	3–0	Newmarket (5)
QLD	BNE	61	The Gap (5)	2–1†	Annerley (4)
QLD	BNE	62	Samford Rangers (6)	0–8	Pine Rivers United (4)
QLD	BNE	63	Jimboomba United (6)	1–5	Albany Creek (3)
QLD	BNE	64	Mitchelton (4)	7–1	Souths United (4)
QLD	BNE	65	North Star (3)	3–1	Slacks Creek Tigers (5)
QLD	BNE	66	Redcliffe PCYC (5)	2–5	Ipswich Knights (3)
QLD	BNE	67	University of Queensland (3)	0–3	Eastern Suburbs (3)
QLD	BNE	68	North Pine United (4)	5–3	Park Ridge (5)
QLD	BNE	69	Brisbane Force (3)	1–3	Peninsula Power (3)
QLD	FNQ	70	Mareeba United (3)	2–0	Edge Hill United (3)
QLD	FNQ	71	Stratford Dolphins (3)	7–3	Southside Comets (3)
QLD	NQ	72	Rebels Gunners (3)	1–2	MA Olympic (3)
QLD	NQ	73	Brothers Townsville (3)	3–4†	Townsville Warriors (3)
QLD	CQ	74	Clinton FC (3)	2–0	Yaralla FC (5)
QLD	CQ	75	Southside United (3)	4–0	Bluebirds United (3)
QLD	MRF	76	Mackay Magpies (3)	13–0	Mackay West United (4)

Fed	Zone	Tie no	Home team (Tier)	Score	Away team (Tier)
QLD	MRF	77	Whitsunday FC (3)	1–0	Country United (3)
QLD	MRF	78	Mackay Crusaders (3)	5–0	Mackay City Brothers (3)
QLD	MRF	79	Mackay Wanderers (3)	4–1	Mackay Lions (3)
QLD	SC	80	Kawana SC (3)	6–0	Buderim Wanderers (3)
QLD	SC	81	Noosa Lions (3)	4–2	Maroochydore (3)
QLD	GC	82	Magic United (4)	3–4	Broadbeach United (3)
QLD	GC	83	Murwillumbah SC (3)	1–4	Mudgeeraba SC (3)
QLD	SWQ	84	West Wanderers United (3)	11–1	Warwick Wanderers (3)
QLD	SWQ	85	St Albans (3)	2–7	Willowburn (3)
South Australia
SA	–	86	North Eastern MetroStars (2)	13–0	International Mount Gambier (4)
SA	–	87	Campbelltown City (2)	2–3†	West Adelaide (2)
SA	–	88	White City (2)	1–0	West Torrens Birkalla (2)
SA	–	89	Barmera United (4)	1–2	Unley Rangers (4)
SA	–	90	Port Adelaide Pirates (2)	5–3	Adelaide Blue Eagles (2)
SA	–	91	South Adelaide (2)	w/o	Renmark Olympic (4)
SA	–	92	Eastern United (3)	2–2†	Modbury Jets (2)
Modbury Jets advance 4–3 on penalties.
SA	–	93	Adelaide Olympic (3)	1–4	Adelaide Comets (2)
SA	–	94	Adelaide Cobras (3)	0–1	Adelaide Victory (3)
SA	–	95	Playford City (3)	1–3	Sturt Lions (3)
SA	–	96	The Cove (3)	1–4	Croydon Kings (2)
SA	–	97	Apollo Mount Gambier (4)	1–0	Cumberland United (3)
SA	–	98	Adelaide City (2)	4–0	Western Strikers (3)
Tasmania
TAS	–	99	Riverside Olympic (3)	1–3	Taroona FC (3)
TAS	–	100	Ulverstone (3)	2–3	New Town Eagles (3)
Victoria
VIC	–	101	Keilor Wolves (7)	0–1†	Melton Phoenix (7)
VIC	–	102	Whitehorse United (7)	1–7	Sunbury United (4)
VIC	–	103	Mazenod United (6)	3–2	Sporting Whittlesea (5)
VIC	–	104	Whittlesea United (6)	3–2	Clifton Hill (4)
VIC	–	105	Fawkner SC (7)	0–1	Essendon United (6)
VIC	–	106	Riversdale (6)	1–0	Altona East Phoenix (4)
VIC	–	107	Morwell Pegasus (4)	3–0	Beaumaris (5)
VIC	–	108	St Kilda SC (6)	0–2	Doncaster Rovers (4)
VIC	–	109	Cobram Roar (9)	0–5	Warragul United (4)
VIC	–	110	Brighton SC (7)	2–4	Eltham Redbacks (7)
VIC	–	111	North Sunshine Eagles (4)	5–0	Mornington FC (4)
VIC	–	112	Essendon Royals (6)	5–0	Yarraville (5)
VIC	–	113	North Caulfield (5)	2–4†	Sandringham (6)
VIC	–	114	Western Eagles (6)	0–3	Corio SC (4)
VIC	–	115	Seaford United (5)	3–1	Keilor Park (4)
VIC	–	116	Caulfield United Cobras (6)	3–0	Brimbank Stallions (7)
VIC	–	117	Point Cook (7)	1–3	Malvern City (4)
VIC	–	118	Heidelberg Stars (5)	0–2	Casey Comets (4)
VIC	–	119	Diamond Valley United (4)	6–1	Old Carey (6)
VIC	–	120	Monbulk Rangers (6)	4–2	Altona City (6)
VIC	–	121	Manningham United Blues (4)	1–0	Heatherton United (5)
VIC	–	122	Preston Lions (4)	3–2	Knox City (6)
VIC	–	123	Altona Magic (4)	2–3	Berwick City (5)
VIC	–	124	Old Scotch (5)	1–0	Geelong Rangers (6)
VIC	–	125	Hampton Park United (7)	1–5	Westgate (4)
VIC	–	126	Kings Domain (8)	1–0†	Cairnlea (4)
VIC	–	127	Moreland United (5)	2–4	Frankston Pines (4)
VIC	–	128	Maribyrnong Greens (7)	0–4	Truganina Hornets (7)
VIC	–	129	Geelong (5)	3–1	Hoppers Crossing (6)
VIC	–	130	Noble Park United (4)	0–2	Langwarrin (4)
VIC	–	131	Old Melburnians (6)	0–6	Sydenham Park (4)
VIC	–	132	South Springvale (4)	3–2†	Western Suburbs (4)
Western Australia
WA	–	133	Ellenbrook United (4)	2–2†	Wanneroo City (4)
Wanneroo City advance 5–4 on penalties.
WA	–	134	Ashfield (3)	4–0	Hamersley Rovers (5)
WA	–	135	Curtin University (4)	4–1	Port Kennedy (5)
WA	–	136	Joondalup United (3)	9–0	Olympic Heat (5)
WA	–	137	Kelmscott Roos (4)	1–11	Gwelup Croatia (5)
WA	–	138	Olympic Kingsway (4)	1–2	Swan United (3)
WA	–	139	Melville City (4)	7–1	Twin City Saints (5)
WA	–	140	South West Phoenix (3)	4–0	Bunbury Dynamos (5)
WA	–	141	Balga (4)	1–2	Kingsley (5)
WA	–	142	UWA-Nedlands (3)	5–0	Eaton Dardanup (6)
WA	–	143	Gosnells City (3)	0–6	Mandurah City (3)
WA	–	144	Chapman Athletic (5)	0–5	North Lake (6)
WA	–	145	BB United (5)	3–1	Backpackers FC (8)
WA	–	146	Emerald FC (10)	2–2†	Cracovia White Eagles (8)
Cracovia White Eagles advance 5–4 on penalties.
WA	–	147	Kwinana United (5)	1–2	Fremantle City (4)
WA	–	148	Ballajura AFC (7)	1–4	Busselton SC (5)
WA	–	149	Fremantle Croatia (5)	4–1	Jaguar FC (7)
WA	–	150	Maccabi (6)	1–7	Rockingham City (4)
WA	–	151	Perth Saints (5)	1–8	Shamrock Rovers Perth (3)
WA	–	152	Whitfords City (6)	1–9	Joondalup City (4)
WA	–	153	North Perth United (5)	4–1	East Fremantle (5)

Notes:

- w/o = Walkover
- † = After Extra Time
- ACT Byes – Lanyon United (4), Queanbeyan City (3), Weston-Molonglo (4) and White Eagles (3).
- NSW Byes – Albion Park White Eagles (6), Ararat FC (7), Balmain Tigers (4), Bankstown Sports Strikers (6), Bonnet Bay (6), Bulli FC (6), Carlton Rovers (6), Central Sydney Wolves (9), Dulwich Hill (4), Earlwood Wanderers (6), Glebe Gorillas (6), Glenmore Park (6), Gosford City (6), Hills Brumbies (4), Hurlstone Park Wanderers (7), Hurstville City Minotaurs (5), Inter Lions (4), Kenthurst and District (6), Leppington Lions (7), Marayong Sports (6), North Epping Rangers (7), Oatley RSL (6), Padstow United (6), Pittwater RSL (6), Rydalmere Lions (4), Ryde Saints United (7), Southern Bulls (5), Sydney CBD FC (6), The Entrance Bateau Bay United (6), Werrington FC (9), Wollongong United (6), and Yagoona Lions (6).
- NNSW Byes – South Armidale United (4), Boambee (4) and Alstonville (4).
- NT Byes – Mindil Aces (2), Borroloola FC (2), Hellenic AC (2), 1st Brigade (3), Port Darwin (2) and Palmerston FC (2).
- QLD Byes – Emerald Eagles (3) and Frenchville FC (3).
- SA Byes – Adelaide Raiders (2), Para Hills Knights (2) and Salisbury United (3).
- TAS Byes – Beachside FC (3), Clarence United (3), Metro FC (3) and Southern FC (3).

== Fourth round ==
295 teams took part in this stage of the competition, including approximately 200 qualifiers from the previous round and 100 entering at this stage from the NPL ACT (2), NPL NSW 1 (2), NPL VIC (2), NPL WA (2), NPL NSW 2 (3), NPL TAS (2) and the NPL VIC 1 West and East (3). The Northern Tasmanian champions (3) and Southern Tasmanian champions (3) also entered this round. The lowest ranked sides that qualified for this round were Central Sydney Wolves and Werrington FC. They were the only level 9 teams left in the competition.

Fed	Zone	Tie no	Home team (Tier)	Score	Away team (Tier)
Australian Capital Territory
ACT	–	1	Narrabundah FC (3)	0–5	Gungahlin United (2)
ACT	–	2	Lanyon United (4)	0–5	Monaro Panthers (2)
ACT	–	3	Brindabella Blues (6)	0–6	Canberra Olympic (2)
ACT	–	4	Woden Weston (2)	2–5†	Tuggeranong United (2)
ACT	–	5	ANU FC (3)	1–0	Queanbeyan City (3)
ACT	–	6	Tigers FC (2)	4–3	Canberra FC (2)
ACT	–	7	White Eagles (3)	3–0	Weston-Molonglo (4)
New South Wales
NSW	–	8	North Epping Rangers (7)	5–2	Central Sydney Wolves (9)
NSW	–	9	St George (3)	0–1†	Hawkesbury City (4)
NSW	–	10	Sydney CBD FC (6)	0–3	Woonona FC (6)
NSW	–	11	Hurstville City Minotaurs (5)	6–1	Leppington Lions (7)
NSW	–	12	Sydney United 58 (2)	2–2†	APIA Leichhardt Tigers (2)
Sydney United 58 advance 4–1 on penalties.
NSW	–	13	St Clair United (6)	0–2	Western NSW Mariners (4)
NSW	–	14	Pittwater RSL (6)	1–1†	The Entrance Bateau Bay United (6)
The Entrance Bateau Bay United advance 5–3 on penalties.
NSW	–	15	Waverley Old Boys (6)	1–6	Sydney Olympic (2)
NSW	–	16	Nepean FC (4)	2–0	Hurlstone Park Wanderers (7)
NSW	–	17	Marayong Sports (6)	0–2	Leichhardt Saints (6)
NSW	–	18	Parramatta FC (2)	3–3†	Southern Bulls (5)
Parramatta FC advance 5–4 on penalties.
NSW	–	19	Blacktown Spartans (2)	7–0	North Sydney United (6)
NSW	–	20	Kenthurst and District (6)	8–0	Ryde Saints United (7)
NSW	–	21	Lilli Pilli (6)	0–3	GHFA Spirit (3)
NSW	–	22	Werrington FC (9)	w/o	Manly United (2)
NSW	–	23	Northbridge FC (4)	3–1	Dapto Dandaloo Fury (6)
NSW	–	24	Fraser Park (3)	2–3	Bonnyrigg White Eagles (2)
NSW	–	25	Blacktown City (2)	6–0	Ararat FC (7)
NSW	–	26	Bankstown City (3)	5–2	Dunbar Rovers (5)
NSW	–	27	Auburn FC (6)	3–3†	Inter Lions (4)
Inter Lions advance 5–4 on penalties.
NSW	–	28	Prospect United (5)	1–0	Central Coast FC (6)
NSW	–	29	Padstow United (6)	0–4	Macarthur Rams (3)
NSW	–	30	Albion Park White Eagles (6)	3–4†	Sydney University (3)
NSW	–	31	Bankstown Sports Strikers (6)	1–6	Gosford City (6)
NSW	–	32	Mounties Wanderers (3)	2–1	Dulwich Hill (4)
NSW	–	33	Rockdale City Suns (2)	2–1	Rydalmere Lions (4)
NSW	–	34	Granville Rage (4)	0–4	Bankstown Berries (3)
NSW	–	35	Earlwood Wanderers (6)	0–13	Hurstville ZFC (5)
NSW	–	36	Wollongong United (6)	1–0	Stanmore Hawks (4)
NSW	–	37	Como West Jannali (6)	0–3	Coogee United (6)
NSW	–	38	Glebe Gorillas (6)	1–2	Hakoah Sydney City East (3)
NSW	–	39	Hills Brumbies (4)	1–8	Northern Tigers (3)
NSW	–	40	Balmain Tigers (4)	5–0	Glenmore Park (6)
NSW	–	41	Yagoona Lions (6)	6–5†	Oatley RSL (6)
NSW	–	42	Mt Druitt Town Rangers (3)	2–3†	South Coast Wolves (2)
NSW	–	43	Carlton Rovers (6)	0–4	Port Kembla (6)
NSW	–	44	Bulli FC (6)	11–1	Bonnet Bay (6)
NSW	–	45	Arncliffe Aurora (6)	5–0	Hurstville Glory (6)
NSW	–	46	Wagga City Wanderers (5)	4–2	Western Condors (5)
NSW	–	47	Marconi Stallions (2)	0–5	Sutherland Sharks (2)
Northern New South Wales
NNSW	MNC	48	Tuncurry Forster (4)	4–1	Macleay Valley Rangers (4)
NNSW	NI	49	Northern Companions (4)	1–1†	South Armidale United (4)
South Armidale United advance 4–2 on penalties
NNSW	NC	50	Coffs City United (4)	0–0†	Boambee (4)
Coffs City United advance 5–3 on penalties.
NNSW	FNC	51	Goonellabah (4)	0–5	Alstonville (4)
NNSW	STH	52	Valentine FC (3)	7–0	Hunter Simba (6)
NNSW	STH	53	Mayfield United Senior (4)	3–3†	Jesmond FC (5)
Jesmond FC advance 5–4 on penalties.
NNSW	STH	54	Thornton Redbacks (3)	1–3	West Wallsend (3)
NNSW	STH	55	Broadmeadow Magic (2)	2–0	Lambton Jaffas (2)
NNSW	STH	56	Weston Workers Bears (2)	0–6	Adamstown Rosebud (2)
NNSW	STH	57	Charlestown City Blues (2)	3–2	Maitland FC (2)
NNSW	STH	58	Hamilton Olympic (2)	1–2	Edgeworth FC (2)
Northern Territory
NT	DAR	59	Casuarina FC (2)	5–1	Mindil Aces (2)
NT	DAR	60	Borroloola FC (3)	0–7	Hellenic AC (2)
NT	DAR	61	1st Brigade (3)	1–2	Port Darwin (2)
NT	DAR	62	Palmerston FC (2)	2–9	Darwin Olympic (2)
Queensland
QLD	BNE	63	North Pine United (4)	4–0	The Gap (5)
QLD	BNE	64	Mount Gravatt Hawks (4)	1–2	Peninsula Power (3)
QLD	BNE	65	North Star (3)	0–2†	Eastern Suburbs (3)
QLD	BNE	66	Ipswich Knights (3)	3–1	Moggill (4)
QLD	BNE	67	Pine Rivers United (4)	6–0	Southside Eagles (4)
QLD	BNE	68	Taringa Rovers (4)	8–1	Virginia United (6)
QLD	BNE	69	Brighton Bulldogs (7)	0–3	Centenary Stormers (5)
QLD	BNE	70	Queensland Lions (3)	5–1	Rochedale Rovers (3)
QLD	BNE	71	Bayside United (4)	5–1	Pine Hills (4)
QLD	BNE	72	Mitchelton (4)	3–4†	Albany Creek (3)
QLD	FNQ	73	Mareeba United (3)	1–3	Stratford Dolphins (3)

Fed	Zone	Tie no	Home team (Tier)	Score	Away team (Tier)
QLD	NQ	74	MA Olympic (3)	1–4	Townsville Warriors (3)
QLD	CQ	75	Southside United (3)	1–0	Clinton FC (3)
QLD	CQ	76	Frenchville FC (3)	10–2	Emerald Eagles (3)
QLD	MRF	77	Mackay Magpies (3)	7–5	Mackay Wanderers (3)
QLD	MRF	78	Mackay Crusaders (3)	0–5	Whitsunday FC (3)
QLD	SC	79	Kawana SC (3)	5–1	Noosa Lions (3)
Kawana SC removed from competition for fielding ineligible players.
QLD	WB	80	Alloway FC (3)	1–5	United Park Eagles (3)
QLD	WB	81	Fraser Flames (3)	1–2	United Warriors (3)
QLD	GC	82	Broadbeach United (3)	2–0	Mudgeeraba SC (3)
QLD	SWQ	83	West Wanderers United (3)	1–1†	Willowburn (3)
West Wanderers United advance 3–1 on penalties.
South Australia
SA	–	84	Unley Rangers (4)	0–11	Adelaide Comets (2)
SA	–	85	Port Adelaide Pirates (2)	2–1†	Adelaide Raiders (2)
SA	–	86	North Eastern MetroStars (2)	3–1	South Adelaide (2)
SA	–	87	Sturt Lions (3)	4–1†	Adelaide Victory (3)
SA	–	88	Adelaide City (2)	4–0	West Adelaide (2)
SA	–	89	White City (2)	4–2†	Salisbury United (3)
SA	–	90	Para Hills Knights (2)	2–2†	Modbury Jets (2)
Para Hills Knights advance 7–6 on penalties.
SA	–	91	Croydon Kings (2)	18–0	Apollo Mount Gambier (4)
Tasmania
TAS	–	92	South Hobart (2)	2–1†	Devonport City (2)
TAS	–	93	New Town Eagles (3)	1–6	Northern Rangers (2)
TAS	–	94	Launceston City (2)	4–0	Somerset (3)
TAS	–	95	Olympia Warriors (2)	4–0	Clarence United (3)
TAS	–	96	Metro (3)	0–4	Kingborough Lions (2)
TAS	–	97	Hobart Zebras (2)	6–3	Taroona (3)
TAS	–	98	Southern FC (3)	1–7	Beachside (3)
TAS	–	99	University of Tasmania (3)	8–1	Glenorchy Knights (2)
Victoria
VIC	–	100	Whittlesea United (6)	0–5	South Melbourne (2)
VIC	–	101	Murray United (3)	2–6	Morwell Pegasus (4)
VIC	–	102	Malvern City (4)	1–2	Essendon Royals (6)
VIC	–	103	Bentleigh Greens (2)	9–0	Seaford United (5)
VIC	–	104	Doncaster Rovers (4)	0–5	Preston Lions (4)
VIC	–	105	Sunshine George Cross (3)	6–6†	North Sunshine Eagles (4)
North Sunshine Eagles advance 4–2 on penalties.
VIC	–	106	Corio SC (4)	0–12	Oakleigh Cannons (2)
VIC	–	107	Avondale FC (2)	3–1	Northcote City (2)
VIC	–	108	Kingston City (3)	3–2	Dandenong Thunder (2)
VIC	–	109	Truganina Hornets (7)	0–7	Heidelberg United (2)
VIC	–	110	St Albans Saints (3)	1–1†	Caulfield United Cobras (6)
Caulfield United Cobras advance 5–4 on penalties.
VIC	–	111	Eastern Lions (3)	0–1	Port Melbourne Sharks (2)
VIC	–	112	Box Hill United (3)	4–1	Essendon United (6)
VIC	–	113	Mazenod United (6)	2–2†	Sandringham (6)
Mazenod United advance 6–5 on penalties.
VIC	–	114	Casey Comets (4)	0–1	South Springvale (4)
VIC	–	115	Diamond Valley United (4)	1–2	Green Gully (2)
VIC	–	116	Bendigo City (3)	2–1	Eltham Redbacks (7)
VIC	–	117	Sunbury United (4)	3–2	Monbulk Rangers (6)
VIC	–	118	Hume City (2)	5–0	Riversdale (6)
VIC	–	119	Werribee City (2)	0–2	Springvale White Eagles (3)
VIC	–	120	Warragul United (4)	1–4	Moreland Zebras (3)
VIC	–	121	Langwarrin (4)	5–0	Berwick City (5)
VIC	–	122	Richmond (3)	2–1	FC Bulleen Lions (3)
VIC	–	123	Goulburn Valley Suns (3)	3–2	Whittlesea Ranges (3)
VIC	–	124	Kings Domain (8)	1–5	Frankston Pines (4)
VIC	–	125	Moreland City (3)	1–3	Ballarat Red Devils (3)
VIC	–	126	Geelong (5)	3–1	Westgate (4)
VIC	–	127	Old Scotch (5)	2–1	Nunawading City (3)
VIC	–	128	Sydenham Park (4)	0–4	Pascoe Vale (2)
VIC	–	129	Brunswick City (3)	2–0	Dandenong City (3)
VIC	–	130	Melton Phoenix (7)	1–4	Melbourne Knights (2)
VIC	–	131	North Geelong Warriors (2)	6–1	Manningham United Blues (4)
Western Australia
WA	–	132	Armadale (2)	2–1	Shamrock Rovers Perth (3)
WA	–	133	Joondalup United (3)	0–2	Ashfield (3)
WA	–	134	Busselton (5)	0–5	Bayswater City (2)
WA	–	135	Gwelup Croatia (5)	6–0	Cracovia White Eagles (8)
WA	–	136	Cockburn City (2)	11–1	North Lake (6)
WA	–	137	Floreat Athena (2)	0–3	Perth SC (2)
WA	–	138	Balcatta (2)	2–1	Rockingham City (4)
WA	–	139	Fremantle City (4)	3–1	Curtin University (4)
WA	–	140	Inglewood United (2)	3–0	UWA-Nedlands (3)
WA	–	141	Joondalup City (4)	3–1	Melville City (4)
WA	–	142	Fremantle Croatia (5)	2–3	BB United (5)
WA	–	143	Stirling Lions (2)	2–0	ECU Joondalup (2)
WA	–	144	Sorrento FC (2)	8–2	North Perth United (5)
WA	–	145	Kingsley (5)	3–4	Subiaco AFC (2)
WA	–	146	Swan United (3)	4–4†	Mandurah City (3)
Mandurah City advance 4–2 on penalties.
WA	–	147	Wanneroo City (4)	0–2	South West Phoenix (3)

Notes:

- w/o = Walkover
- † = After Extra Time
- NNSW Byes – South Cardiff (2).

== Fifth round ==
164 teams took part in this stage of the competition, including 148 qualifiers from the previous round and 16 entering at this stage (11 from the NPL QLD (2), 4 from the Football in Central Australia League (2) and the 2014 ACT Federation Cup champion (2)). The lowest ranked side that qualified for this round was North Epping Rangers, the only level 7 team left in the competition.

Fed	Zone	Tie no	Home team (Tier)	Score	Away team (Tier)
Australian Capital Territory
ACT	–	1	Gungahlin United (2)	2–1	Canberra Olympic (2)
ACT	–	2	Tigers FC (2)	4–1	White Eagles (3)
ACT	–	3	Monaro Panthers (2)	2–3	Tuggeranong United (2)
ACT	–	4	ANU FC (3)	1–5	Belconnen United (2)
New South Wales
NSW	–	5	Blacktown Spartans (2)	1–4	Blacktown City (2)
NSW	–	6	Wollongong United (6)	1–0	Inter Lions (4)
NSW	–	7	Kenthurst and District (6)	2–1	The Entrance Bateau Bay United (6)
NSW	–	8	Arncliffe Aurora (6)	0–0†	Rockdale City Suns (2)
Rockdale City Suns advance 4–2 on penalties.
NSW	–	9	Sydney Olympic (2)	3–0	Mounties Wanderers (3)
NSW	–	10	South Coast Wolves (2)	3–1	GHFA Spirit (3)
NSW	–	11	Balmain Tigers (4)	5–0	North Epping Rangers (7)
NSW	–	12	Hurstville ZFC (5)	1–2†	Prospect United (5)
NSW	–	13	Sydney United 58 (2)	1–0	Parramatta FC (2)
NSW	–	14	Hawkesbury City (4)	2–0	Woonona FC (6)
NSW	–	15	Port Kembla (6)	1–2	Sutherland Sharks (2)
NSW	–	16	Bankstown City (3)	3–2†	Coogee United (6)
NSW	–	17	Nepean FC (4)	1–0	Leichhardt Saints (6)
NSW	–	18	Manly United (2)	2–1	Bonnyrigg White Eagles (2)
NSW	–	19	Hurstville City Minotaurs (5)	0–4	Northbridge FC (4)
NSW	–	20	Western NSW Mariners (4)	2–2†	Hakoah Sydney City East (3)
Western NSW Mariners advance 4–1 on penalties.
NSW	–	21	Wagga City Wanderers (5)	0–1	Yagoona Lions (6)
NSW	–	22	Gosford City (6)	1–2	Macarthur Rams (3)
NSW	–	23	Bulli FC (6)	1–4	Sydney University (3)
NSW	–	24	Northern Tigers (3)	3–1	Bankstown Berries (3)
Northern New South Wales
NNSW	MNC v NI	25	Tuncurry Forster (4)	1–2	South Armidale United (4)
NNSW	NC v FNC	26	Coffs City United (4)	8–4	Alstonville (4)
NNSW	STH	27	Charlestown City Blues (2)	4–5	Adamstown Rosebud (2)
NNSW	STH	28	South Cardiff (2)	0–5	Edgeworth FC (2)
Northern Territory
NT	DAR	29	Casuarina FC (2)	3–2	Hellenic AC (2)
NT	DAR	30	Port Darwin (2)	1–8	Darwin Olympic (2)
NT	ASP	31	Buckleys FC (2)	1–4	Alice Springs Celtic (2)
NT	ASP	32	Gillen Scorpions (2)	2–0	Alice Springs Vikings (2)
Queensland
QLD	BNE	33	Queensland Lions (3)	2–0	Albany Creek (3)
QLD	BNE	34	Ipswich Knights (3)	1–0	Western Pride (2)
QLD	BNE	35	North Pine United (4)	1–0†	Bayside United (4)
QLD	BNE	36	Redlands United (2)	2–0	Olympic FC (2)
QLD	BNE	37	Pine Rivers United (4)	2–0	Centenary Stormers (5)
QLD	BNE	38	Moreton Bay United (2)	2–1	Taringa Rovers (4)
QLD	BNE	39	Brisbane Strikers (2)	4–1	Brisbane City (2)
QLD	BNE	40	Peninsula Power (3)	3–2	Eastern Suburbs (3)
QLD	FNQ	41	Stratford Dolphins (3)	1–6	Far North Queensland (2)

Fed	Zone	Tie no	Home team (Tier)	Score	Away team (Tier)
QLD	NQ	42	Townsville Warriors (3)	1–6	Northern Fury (2)
QLD	CQ	43	Frenchville FC (3)	4–2†	Southside United (3)
QLD	MRF	44	Mackay Magpies (3)	2–4	Whitsunday FC (3)
QLD	SC	45	Noosa Lions (3)	3–2†	Sunshine Coast (2)
QLD	WB	46	United Park Eagles (3)	1–4	United Warriors (3)
QLD	GC	47	Broadbeach United (3)	3–3†	Palm Beach (2)
Palm Beach advance 12–11 on penalties.
QLD	SWQ	48	South West Queensland Thunder (2)	1–0†	West Wanderers United (3)
South Australia
SA	–	49	Adelaide City (2)	3–1†	Para Hills Knights (2)
SA	–	50	Croydon Kings (2)	6–1	Adelaide Comets (2)
SA	–	51	Sturt Lions (3)	2–3	Port Adelaide Pirates (2)
SA	–	52	White City (2)	1–0	North Eastern MetroStars (2)
Tasmania
TAS	–	53	Kingborough Lions (2)	4–2†	Hobart Zebras (2)
TAS	–	54	Beachside (3)	4–2	University of Tasmania (3)
TAS	–	55	Northern Rangers (2)	2–1	Olympia Warriors (2)
TAS	–	56	Launceston City (2)	1–3	South Hobart (2)
Victoria
VIC	–	57	Moreland Zebras (3)	0–1	Essendon Royals (5)
VIC	–	58	South Melbourne (2)	8–0	North Sunshine Eagles (4)
VIC	–	59	Pascoe Vale (2)	1–3	North Geelong Warriors (2)
VIC	–	60	Box Hill United (3)	1–2	South Springvale (4)
VIC	–	61	Hume City (2)	4–0	Geelong (5)
VIC	–	62	Frankston Pines (4)	3–1†	Morwell Pegasus (4)
VIC	–	63	Green Gully (2)	0–1†	Kingston City (3)
VIC	–	64	Port Melbourne Sharks (2)	2–2†	Avondale FC (2)
Avondale FC advance 6–5 on penalties.
VIC	–	65	Bendigo City (3)	4–1	Brunswick City (3)
VIC	–	66	Ballarat Red Devils (3)	4–3	Bentleigh Greens (2)
VIC	–	67	Oakleigh Cannons (2)	0–0†	Richmond (3)
Oakleigh Cannons advance 5–4 on penalties.
VIC	–	68	Langwarrin (4)	2–5	Heidelberg United (2)
VIC	–	69	Sunbury United (4)	0–3	Melbourne Knights (2)
VIC	–	70	Springvale White Eagles (3)	0–3	Preston Lions (4)
VIC	–	71	Goulburn Valley Suns (3)	2–0	Mazenod United (6)
VIC	–	72	Old Scotch (5)	1–1†	Caulfield United Cobras (6)
Caulfield United Cobras advance 5–4 on penalties.
Western Australia
WA	–	73	BB United (5)	1–2	Gwelup Croatia (5)
WA	–	74	Cockburn City (2)	3–0	Ashfield (3)
WA	–	75	Balcatta (2)	0–2	Subiaco AFC (2)
WA	–	76	Fremantle City (4)	0–2	Perth SC (2)
WA	–	77	Mandurah City (3)	6–4	Joondalup City (4)
WA	–	78	Inglewood United (2)	0–2	Bayswater City (2)
WA	–	79	South West Phoenix (3)	4–1	Armadale (2)
WA	–	80	Sorrento FC (2)	5–1	Stirling Lions (2)

Notes:

- † = After Extra Time
- NNSW Byes – Broadmeadow Magic (2), Valentine FC (3), Jesmond FC (5) and West Wallsend (3).

== Sixth round ==
A total of 84 teams competed in this round of the competition. The 42 victorious teams in this round qualified for the Seventh Round. The lowest ranked sides that qualified for this round were Caulfield United Cobras, Kenthurst and District, Wollongong United and Yagoona Lions. They were the only level 6 teams left in the competition.

Fed	Zone	Tie no	Home team (Tier)	Score	Away team (Tier)
Australian Capital Territory
ACT	–	1	Tuggeranong United (2)	1–2	Belconnen United (2)
ACT	–	2	Tigers FC (2)	0–3	Gungahlin United (2)
New South Wales
NSW	–	3	Manly United (2)	1–2	Sydney Olympic (2)
NSW	–	4	Prospect United (5)	3–2	Kenthurst and District (6)
NSW	–	5	Sutherland Sharks (2)	4–1	Wollongong United (6)
NSW	–	6	Sydney University (3)	0–2	Rockdale City Suns (2)
NSW	–	7	Hawkesbury City (4)	3–3†	Western NSW Mariners (4)
Western NSW Mariners advance 5–3 on penalties.
NSW	–	8	Northern Tigers (3)	1–1†	Macarthur Rams (3)
Northern Tigers advance 5–4 on penalties.
NSW	–	9	Yagoona Lions (6)	1–10	South Coast Wolves (2)
NSW	–	10	Blacktown City (2)	12–1	Nepean FC (4)
NSW	–	11	Northbridge FC (4)	0–1	Sydney United 58 (2)
NSW	–	12	Balmain Tigers (4)	3–0	Bankstown City (3)
Northern New South Wales
NNSW	NTH v STH	13	Coffs City United (4)	0–4	Edgeworth FC (2)
NNSW	NTH v STH	14	South Armidale United (4)	1–7	Broadmeadow Magic (2)
NNSW	STH	15	Jesmond FC (5)	4–4†	West Wallsend (3)
West Wallsend advance 5–4 on penalties.
NNSW	STH	16	Valentine FC (3)	0–4	Adamstown Rosebud (2)
Northern Territory
NT	DAR	17	Casuarina FC (2)	2–7	Darwin Olympic (2)
NT	ASP	18	Alice Springs Celtic (2)	5–0	Gillen Scorpions (2)
Queensland
QLD	BNE	19	Queensland Lions (3)	3–0	Peninsula Power (3)
QLD	BNE	20	Brisbane Strikers (2)	2–1	Moreton Bay United (2)

Fed	Zone	Tie no	Home team (Tier)	Score	Away team (Tier)
QLD	BNE	21	Redlands United (2)	6–0	Ipswich Knights (3)
QLD	BNE	22	Pine Rivers United (4)	3–0	North Pine United (4)
QLD	FNQ v NQ	23	Northern Fury (2)	0–1	Far North Queensland (2)
QLD	CQ v MRF	24	Frenchville FC (3)	1–0	Whitsunday FC (3)
QLD	SC v WB	25	Noosa Lions (3)	3–0	United Warriors (3)
QLD	GC v SWQ	26	Palm Beach (2)	1–1†	South West Queensland Thunder (2)
Palm Beach advance 4–3 on penalties.
South Australia
SA	–	27	Port Adelaide Pirates (2)	1–4	Adelaide City (2)
SA	–	28	White City (2)	2–2†	Croydon Kings (2)
Croydon Kings advance 4–2 on penalties.
Tasmania
TAS	–	29	Beachside (3)	0–4	South Hobart (2)
TAS	–	30	Kingborough Lions (2)	3–1	Northern Rangers (2)
Victoria
VIC	–	31	Oakleigh Cannons (2)	5–1	Bendigo City (3)
VIC	–	32	Essendon Royals (5)	2–3	Goulburn Valley Suns (3)
VIC	–	33	South Melbourne (2)	3–1	Melbourne Knights (2)
VIC	–	34	Ballarat Red Devils (3)	1–2	Hume City (2)
VIC	–	35	Frankston Pines (4)	1–0	Avondale FC (2)
VIC	–	36	South Springvale (4)	2–1	North Geelong Warriors (2)
VIC	–	37	Preston Lions (4)	0–4	Kingston City (3)
VIC	–	38	Heidelberg United (2)	5–0	Caulfield United Cobras (6)
Western Australia
WA	–	39	Cockburn City (2)	1–2	Bayswater City (2)
WA	–	40	Perth SC (2)	1–0	Subiaco AFC (2)
WA	–	41	Mandurah City (3)	1–4	Gwelup Croatia (5)
WA	–	42	Sorrento FC (2)	4–0	South West Phoenix (3)

Notes:

- † = After Extra Time

== Seventh round ==
A total of 42 teams competed in this round of the competition. The 21 victorious teams in this round qualified for the 2015 FFA Cup Round of 32. The lowest ranked sides that qualified for this round were Gwelup Croatia and Prospect United. They were the only level 5 teams left in the competition.

Fed	Zone	Tie no	Home team (Tier)	Score	Away team (Tier)
Australian Capital Territory
ACT	–	1	Belconnen United (2)	0–1†	Gungahlin United (2)
New South Wales
NSW	–	2	Western NSW Mariners (4)	0–3	Balmain Tigers (4)
NSW	–	3	Sydney Olympic (2)	3–0	South Coast Wolves (2)
NSW	–	4	Sydney United 58 (2)	5–0	Prospect United (5)
NSW	–	5	Rockdale City Suns (2)	3–0	Sutherland Sharks (2)
NSW	–	6	Northern Tigers (3)	0–6	Blacktown City (2)
Northern New South Wales
NNSW	–	7	Adamstown Rosebud (2)	0–3	Edgeworth FC (2)
NNSW	–	8	West Wallsend (3)	0–13	Broadmeadow Magic (2)
Northern Territory
NT	DAR v ASP	9	Darwin Olympic (2)	5–0	Alice Springs Celtic (2)
Queensland
QLD	BNE	10	Redlands United (2)	3–4	Brisbane Strikers (2)
QLD	BNE	11	Queensland Lions (3)	5–0	Pine Rivers United (4)

Fed	Zone	Tie no	Home team (Tier)	Score	Away team (Tier)
QLD	NQL	12	Frenchville FC (3)	1–7	Far North Queensland (2)
QLD	SQL	13	Palm Beach (2)	1–0	Noosa Lions (3)
South Australia
SA	–	14	Adelaide City (2)	0–2	Croydon Kings (2)
Tasmania
TAS	–	15	Kingborough Lions (2)	0–4	South Hobart (2)
Victoria
VIC	–	16	South Melbourne (2)	6–1	Frankston Pines (4)
VIC	–	17	Hume City (2)	2–0	Kingston City (3)
VIC	–	18	South Springvale (4)	1–2	Oakleigh Cannons (2)
VIC	–	19	Heidelberg United (2)	5–1	Goulburn Valley Suns (3)
Western Australia
WA	–	20	Perth SC (2)	4–3	Gwelup Croatia (5)
WA	–	21	Bayswater City (2)	1–1†	Sorrento FC (2)
Sorrento FC advance 4–2 on penalties.

Notes:

- † = After Extra Time
