= 2015 NNSW FFA Cup qualifying rounds =

2015 NNSW FFA Cup qualifying
NNSW football finals series

Tournament details
- Country: Australia
- Dates: 13 February 2015 – 21 June 2015
- Teams: Approx. 80
- All statistics correct as of 23 February 2015. Finals series played at Lake Macquarie Regional Football Facility

The 2015 NNSW FFA Cup qualifying rounds and finals series was a knockout competition run in Northern New South Wales, by Northern NSW Football, used to determine the two Northern NSW entrants to the national 2015 FFA Cup. For the Preliminary rounds, Football Far North Coast kicked off the overall competition with matches on 13 February.

== Format ==
Due to travel distances and time restraints, the competition was divided into two pools, the northern pool and the southern pool.

== Northern pool ==
The four northern-pool zones play off within their respective district-based zones. The zone winners then played off for two places in the quarter-finals stage of the preliminary round.

=== First round ===
Football Mid North Coast

14 February 2015	Macleay Valley Rangers (-)	3-2	Port Saints FC (-)	Dangar Street Field, Kempsey
17:00	Potter ?'; Saul ?'; Applegate ?'	Report	Khodary ?'; Rogers ?'

14 February 2015	Club Taree Wildcats (-)	2-2 (2–4 p)	Tuncurry Forster FC (-)	Omaru Park, Taree
17:00	? ?' ? ?'	Report	Yeates 8'; Chapman 60'
	Penalties
	- (penalty scored); - (penalty scored); - (penalty missed); - (penalty missed)		(penalty scored) Chick; (penalty scored) Kianou; (penalty scored) Croker; (penalty scored) Aquilina

Northern Inland Football

22 March 2015	Gunnedah United (-)	v	North Armidale FC (-)	TBA, Armidale
TBA

22 March 2015	Inverell Joeys FC (-)	v	South Armidale United FC (-)	TBA, Armidale
TBA

22 March 2015	East Armidale FC (-)	v	Oxley Vale Attunga FC (-)	Doody Park, Tamworth
TBA

22 March 2015	North Companions FC (-)	v	Demon Knights FC (-)	Doody Park, Tamworth
TBA

22 March 2015	The Armidale School (-)	v	Tamworth FC (-)	Doody Park, Tamworth
16:30

North Coast Football

28 February 2015	Boambee Bombers (-)	8-0	Woolgoolga United FC (-)	Ayshire Park, Boambee
15:00

28 February 2015	Coffs City United FC (-)	v	Northern Storm Thunder (-)	Ayshire Park, Boambee
17:00

28 February 2015	Goonellabah FC (-)	v	Lismore Workers FC (-)	Barnier Park, Junction Hill
15:00

28 February 2015	Maclean FC (-)	v	Coffs Coast Tigers FC (-)	Barnier Park, Junction Hill
17:00

- Byes: Urunga FC (-)

Football Far North Coast

13 February 2015	Ballina SC (4)	0-3	Lismore Thistles SC (4)	John Ryan Field, East Lismore
19:00		Report

13 February 2015	Lennox Head (4)	1-3	Alstonville FC (4)	Skennars Head 1, Skennars Head
19:00	Feresch ?'	Report	Arthur ?'; Brambly ?'; Francis ?'

15 February 2015	Goonellabah FC (4)	2-1	Lismore Workers FC (4)	Weston Park 1, Goonellabah
19:00	Annetts 30'; Annetts ?'	Report; Video	Keevers ?'

=== Second round ===
Football Mid North Coast

21 February 2015	Tuncurry Forster FC (4)	4-1	Lismore Workers FC (4)	Tuncurry Sports Complex, Tuncurry
15:00		Report

Northern Inland Football

TBA	Northern Inland Winner Match 1 (-)	v	Northern Inland Winner Match 2 (-)	TBA
TBA

TBA	Northern Inland Winner Match 3 (-)	v	Northern Inland Winner Match 4 (-)	TBA
TBA

- Byes: Northern Inland Winner Match 5 ()

North Coast Football

TBA	North Coast Winner Match 1 (-)	v	North Coast Winner Match 2 (-)	TBA
TBA

TBA	North Coast Winner Match 3 (-)	v	Urunga FC (-)	TBA
TBA

- Byes: North Coast Winner Match 4 ()

Football Far North Coast

TBA	Goonellabah FC (2)	v	Lismore Thistles SC (2)	TBA
TBA

- Byes: Alstonville FC (2)

=== Third round ===
Football Mid North Coast

- Byes: Tuncurry Forster FC (4)

Northern Inland Football

Tie no	Home team (tier)	Score	Away team (tier)
1	Northern Inland Winner Round 2 Match 1 ()	–	Northern Inland Round 1 Winner Match 5 ()

- Byes: Northern Inland Winner Round 2 Match 2 ()

North Coast Football

Tie no	Home team (tier)	Score	Away team (tier)
1	North Coast Winner Round 2 Match 1 ()	–	North Coast Winner Round 1 Match 4 ()

- Byes: North Coast Winner Round 2 Match 2 () (Unless Urunga FC win as they have already had a bye)

Football Far North Coast

Tie no	Home team (tier)	Score	Away team (tier)
1	Far North Coast Winner Round 2 Match 1 ()	–	Alstonville FC (2)

=== Fourth round ===
Football Mid North Coast

- Byes: Tuncurry Forster FC (4)

Northern Inland Football

Tie no	Home team (tier)	Score	Away team (tier)
1	Northern Inland Winner Round 3 Match 1 ()	–	Northern Inland Winner Round 2 Match 2 ()

North Coast Football

Tie no	Home team (tier)	Score	Away team (tier)
1	North Coast Winner Round 3 Match 1 ()	–	North Coast Winner Round 2 Match 2 ()

Football Far North Coast

- Byes: Football Far North Coast Round 3 Winner Match 1 ()

=== Fifth round ===
Football Mid North Coast vs Northern Inland Football

Tie no	Home team (tier)	Score	Away team (tier)
1	Tuncurry Forster FC (4)	–	Northern Inland Winner Round 4 Match 1 () –

North Coast Football vs Football Far North Coast

Tie no	Home team (tier)	Score	Away team (tier)
1	North Coast Winner Round 4 Match 1 ()	–	Football Far North Coast Round 3 Winner Match 1 ()

== Southern pool ==
=== Second round ===
21 February 2015	Beresfield United Senior SC (4)	10–0	Warners Bay FC (5)	LMRFF 1, Speers Point
10:00

21 February 2015	Belmont Tingira FC (-)	w/o	Newcastle Suns FC (4)	LMRFF 2, Speers Point
10:30

21 February 2015	Merewether Advance SFC (6)	1–7	Kotara South FC (5)	LMRFF 1, Speers Point
12:00

21 February 2015	New Lambton Eagles FC (4)	1–1 (5–4 p)	New Lambton FC (7)	LMRFF 2, Speers Point
12:30
	Penalties
	? (penalty scored) ? (penalty scored) ? (penalty scored) ? (penalty scored) ? (penalty scored)		?

21 February 2015	Plattsburg Maryland FC (6)	3-0	Cardiff City FC (4)	LMRFF 1, Speers Point
14:00

21 February 2015	Westlakes Wildcats FC (5)	1-9	Kahibah FC (3)	LMRFF 2, Speers Point
14:30

21 February 2015	Cooks Hill United FC (3)	2-0	Barnsley United Senior SC (4)	LMRFF 1, Speers Point
16:00

21 February 2015	Toronto Awaba FC (3)	3-0	Garden Suburb FC (4)	LMRFF 2, Speers Point
16:30

21 February 2015	Belmont Swansea United SC (3)	0-1	Swansea FC (4)	LMRFF 1, Speers Point
18:00

21 February 2015	Newcastle University Mens FC (4)	3-2	Wallsend FC (3)	LMRFF 2, Speers Point
18:30

22 February 2015	Stockton Sharks FC (5)	0-3	Dudley Redhead Senior FC (4)	LMRFF 1, Speers Point
10:00

22 February 2015	Hunter Simba FC (6)	5-4	Morriset United FC (5)	LMRFF 2, Speers Point
10:30

22 February 2015	Kurri Kurri Senior SC (6)	5-0	Mayfield United Junior SFC (7)	LMRFF 1, Speers Point
12:00

22 February 2015	Tenambit Sharks FC (6)	3-5	Medowie FC (6)	LMRFF 2, Speers Point
12:30

22 February 2015	Charlestown Junior FC (5)	3-2	RAAF Base Williamtown (7)	LMRFF 1, Speers Point
14:00

22 February 2015	Muswellbrook FC (6)	0-12	Singleton Strikers FC (3)	LMRFF 2, Speers Point
14:30

22 February 2015	Mayfield United Senior FC (4)	17-1	Dudley Redhead Junior (7)	LMRFF 1, Speers Point
16:00

22 February 2015	Thornton Redbacks FC (3)	5-2	Cessnock City Hornets FC (3)	LMRFF 2, Speers Point
16:30

22 February 2015	Beresfield FC (5)	0-2	West Wallsend SFC (3)	LMRFF 1, Speers Point
18:00

22 February 2015	Valentine FC (3)	8-3	Lake Macquarie City FC (3)	LMRFF 2, Speers Point
18:30

- Byes : Jesmond FC (5)

=== Third round ===
The winners from the second round played the seeded NNSW NPL teams. The second round took place on the weekend of 28 February - 1 March 2015.

28 February 2015	Swansea FC (4)	v	Broadmeadow Magic FC (2)	LMRFF 2, Speers Point
9:30

28 February 2015	Newcastle University Mens FC (4)	v	Weston Workers Bears FC (2)	LMRFF 1, Speers Point
10:00

28 February 2015	Cooks Hill United FC (3)	v	Maitland FC (2)	LMRFF 2, Speers Point
11:30

28 February 2015	Kahibah FC (3)	v	South Cardiff FC (2)	LMRFF 1, Speers Point
12:00

28 February 2015	Plattsburg Maryland FC (6)	v	Charlestown City Blues FC (2)	LMRFF 2, Speers Point
13:30

28 February 2015	New Lambton Eagles FC (4)	v	Edgeworth FC (2)	LMRFF 1, Speers Point
14:00

28 February 2015	Beresfield United (4)	v	Lambton Jaffas FC (2)	LMRFF 2, Speers Point
15:30

28 February 2015	Newcastle Suns FC (4)	v	Hamilton Olympic FC (2)	LMRFF 1, Speers Point
16:00

28 February 2015	Kotara South (5)	v	Adamstown Rosebud FC (2)	LMRFF 2, Speers Point
17:30

28 February 2015	Jesmond FC (5)	v	Toronto Awaba FC (3)	LMRFF 1, Speers Point
18:00

1 March 2015	Hunter Simba (6)	v	Kurri Kurri (6)	Lydon Oval, Dudley
11:00

1 March 2015	Charlestown Junior (5)	v	Mayfield United Senior (4)	Lydon Oval, Dudley
13:00

1 March 2015	Dudley Redhead Senior (4)	v	Valentine FC (3)	Lydon Oval, Dudley
15:00

1 March 2015	Medowie (6)	v	Thornton Redbacks (3)	Johnston Park, West Wallsend
14:00

1 March 2015	West Wallsend (3)	v	Singleton Strikers (3)	Johnston Park, West Wallsend
16:00

=== Fourth round ===
Tie no	Home team (tier)	Score	Away team (tier)
1	Third round qualifier (-)	–	Third round qualifier (-)
2	Third round qualifier (-)	–	Third round qualifier (-)
3	Third round qualifier (-)	–	Third round qualifier (-)
4	Third round qualifier (-)	–	Third round qualifier (-)
5	Third round qualifier (-)	–	Third round qualifier (-)
6	Third round qualifier (-)	–	Third round qualifier (-)
7	Third round qualifier (-)	–	Third round qualifier (-)

- Byes : 1 Division 1 or zone league team.

=== Fifth round ===
The draw will most likely be as follows:

Tie no	Home team (tier)	Score	Away team (tier)
1	Fourth round qualifier (-)	–	Fourth round qualifier (-)
2	Fourth round qualifier (-)	–	Fourth round qualifier (-)

- Byes : 3–4 Division 1 or zone league teams will be given byes in preference to NPL teams. Depending on who prevails, up to 1 NPL team may be given a bye.

== NNSW finals ==
The NNSW football finals series will take place on the weekend of 20–21 June 2015. The finals will be composed of:

- 2 teams from the northern pool
- 3 teams from the NPL southern pool
- 3 teams from the Division 1 and zone southern pool.

=== Quarter-finals ===
The quarter-finals took place at the Lake Macquarie Regional Football Facility on 20 June 2015.

Tie no	Home team (tier)	Score	Away team (tier)
1	NTH Quarter-final Qualifier (-)	–	STH Quarter-final Qualifier (-)
2	NTH Quarter-final Qualifier (-)	–	STH Quarter-final Qualifier (-)
3	STH Quarter-final Qualifier (-)	–	STH Quarter-final Qualifier (-)
4	STH Quarter-final Qualifier (-)	–	STH Quarter-final Qualifier (-)

=== Semi-finals ===
The semi-finals took place at the Lake Macquarie Regional Football Facility on 21 June 2015.
