= 2020 Football Northern NSW season =

Football Northern NSW
- Season: 2020

The 2020 Northern NSW Football season is the seventh season under the new competition format in northern New South Wales.

All NPL and grassroots competitions were suspended for one month due to the impacts from the COVID-19 pandemic in Australia, effective 18 March to 14 April, and further extended until early July. The NPL season commenced on 12 July.

== League tables ==
=== 2020 Northern NSW National Premier Leagues ===
NPL Northern NSW
- Season: 2020
- Champions: Edgeworth FC
- Premiers: Edgeworth FC
- Relegated: -
- Top goalscorer: -

The revised competition comprised a single round-robin, followed by a seeded draw to determine opponents in the final five rounds, followed by a five-team finals series. The NPL Premier normally qualifies for the national NPL finals series, but the 2020 National Premier Leagues finals series was cancelled in July.

==== League table ====
Pos	Team	Pld	W	D	L	GF	GA	GD	Pts	Qualification or relegation
1	Edgeworth FC (C)	13	11	0	2	33	8	+25	33	2020 NNSW Finals
2	Broadmeadow Magic	13	8	2	3	29	16	+13	26	2020 NNSW Finals
3	Newcastle Olympic	13	7	2	4	26	18	+8	23	2020 NNSW Finals
4	Charlestown Azzurri	13	7	2	4	16	11	+5	23	2020 NNSW Finals
5	Maitland FC	13	7	1	5	24	16	+8	22	2020 NNSW Finals
6	Lambton Jaffas	13	5	4	4	25	18	+7	19	
7	Weston Workers	13	5	3	5	21	19	+2	18	
8	Valentine Phoenix	13	3	3	7	12	29	−17	12	
9	Adamstown Rosebud	13	1	2	10	11	40	−29	5	
10	Lake Macquarie City	13	1	1	11	11	33	−22	4	

Source: sportstg.com
Rules for classification: 1) points; 2) goal difference; 3) number of goals scored.
(C) Champions

==== Results ====
Home \ Away	ADA	BRO	CCB	EDG	LAM	LMC	MAI	NCO	VFC	WES
Adamstown Rosebud	—			1–3						1–1
Broadmeadow Magic		—	3–1	0–1						
Charlestown Azzurri	0–1		—			1–1				
Edgeworth FC			1–0	—			4–1			
Lambton Jaffas					—			2–2		2–3
Lake Macquarie City	2–1				0–1	—				
Maitland FC						4–1	—		5–1	
Newcastle Olympic		1–3						—	2–2	
Valentine Phoenix		0–5			0–4				—	
Weston Workers							1–0	1–2		—

Source: Soccerway
Legend: Blue = home team win; Yellow = draw; Red = away team win.

==== Finals ====
Qualifying final
2	Broadmeadow Magic	3
3	Newcastle Olympic	1
4	Charlestown Azzurri	1 (3)
5	Maitland FC (p)	1 (5)

Major semi-final
1	Edgeworth FC	3 (4)
2	Broadmeadow Magic	3 (3)
Minor semi-final
3	Newcastle Olympic	0
5	Maitland FC	4

Preliminary final
2	Broadmeadow Magic	0
5	Maitland FC	2

Grand final
1	Edgeworth FC	1
5	Maitland FC	0

=== 2020 NEWFM Northern League One ===
==== League table ====
NEWFM Northern League One
- Season: 2020
- Champions: Singleton Strikers
- Premiers: New Lambton
- Matches: -
- Top goalscorer: -
- Biggest home win: -
- Biggest away win: -
- Highest scoring: -

Pos	Team	Pld	W	D	L	GF	GA	GD	Pts	Qualification
1	New Lambton	14	9	3	2	40	13	+27	30	2020 Northern State League Finals
2	Singleton Strikers (C)	14	8	4	2	28	14	+14	28	2020 Northern State League Finals
3	Kahibah FC	14	8	2	4	32	26	+6	26	2020 Northern State League Finals
4	Belmont Swansea United	14	8	2	4	23	17	+6	26	2020 Northern State League Finals
5	Cooks Hill United	14	8	1	5	29	21	+8	25	2020 Northern State League Finals
6	West Wallsend	14	6	4	4	23	21	+2	22	
7	Toronto Awaba Stags	14	6	1	7	30	36	−6	19	
8	Cessnock City Hornets	14	4	5	5	13	17	−4	17	
9	South Cardiff	14	4	0	10	19	25	−6	12	
10	Thornton Redbacks	14	3	1	10	18	29	−11	10	
11	Wallsend FC	14	1	1	12	12	48	−36	4	

Source: sportstg.com
Rules for classification: 1) points; 2) goal difference; 3) number of goals scored.
(C) Champions

==== Finals ====
Qualifying final
2	Singleton Strikers	1
3	Kahibah FC	0
4	Belmont Swansea United	0
5	Cooks Hill United	4

Major semi-final
1	New Lambton	0
2	Singleton Strikers	4
Minor semi-final
3	Kahibah FC	3
5	Cooks Hill United	4

Preliminary final
New Lambton	2
Cooks Hill United	0

Grand final
Singleton Strikers	2
New Lambton	0

== Cup competitions ==
=== FFA Cup preliminary rounds ===
Northern NSW soccer clubs commenced the 2020 FFA Cup preliminary rounds in February, only to see it suspended due to the impacts from the pandemic. At the time of suspension, only the first two rounds had been played, involving teams mostly from the Northern regions. The competition was cancelled on 3 July.
