= Northern Inland Football =

- Founded: 2006
- Country: Australia
- Number of clubs: 12
- Domestic cup: Australia Cup
- Current champions: Inverell FC (2025)
- Website: Official Website

Northern Inland Football is an association football competition based in the Northern Inland Region of New South Wales extending from Quirindi in the South to Tenterfield in the North. The association was established in its current form in 2006, having previously been known as the separate entities of North West Soccer Association and New England Soccer. Its offices are located in Tamworth, the largest city in the region.

The Northern Inland Premier League has been run under various names since 1995. The competition is conducted by Northern New South Wales Football, the governing body in the region.

== Clubs ==
There are over 25 clubs in the region:

- Barraba Soccer Club
- Coonabarabran Galaxy Soccer Club
- Glen Innes Highlanders
- Guyra United Football Club
- Hilvue Rovers Football Club
- Inverell Football Club
- Kootingal Soccer Club
- Lightning Ridge Soccer Club
- Manilla United Football Club
- Moree Football Club
- Moree Junior Soccer Club
- Namoi United Football Club
- Narrabri Football Club
- North Companions Football Club
- Oxley Vale Attunga Football Club
- Quirindi Soccer Club
- Souths United Lightning Football Club
- Tamworth Football Club
- TAS Football Club
- East Armidale United Football Club
- Norths United Football Club
- South Armidale United Football Club
- Demon Knights Football Club
- Armidale City Westside Football Club
- Wee Waa Football Club
- Western Wolves Women's FC

== Premier Division Structure ==
In the 2026 season the competition has reverted to a 12 team home and away competition.

Southern Coneference

- Hillvue Rovers
- Moore Creek Mountain Goats
- South United Lightning
- North Companions
- Oxley Vale Attunga FC
- Tamworth Football Club
- Namoi United FC
- East Armidale United
- Norths United FC
- Demon Knights FC
- Inverell FC
- Armidale City Westside

== Honours ==
Season	Champions	Premiers (Southern Conference)	Premiers (Northern Conference)	Club Championship	FFA Cup Best Performance
1998	Ex-Services Club				
1999	Hillvue Rovers	Hillvue Rovers			
2000					
2001	North Companions	North Companions			
2002	Gunnedah United	Gunnedah United			
2003	North Armidale	North Armidale			
2004	North Companions	North Companions			
2005	North Armidale	South Armidale			
2006	North Armidale	North Armidale			
2007	North Companions	North Companions			
2008	Oxley Vale Attunga	Oxley Vale Attunga		Oxley Vale Attunga	
2009	Oxley Vale Attunga	Oxley Vale Attunga		Oxley Vale Attunga	
2010	North Armidale	North Armidale			
2011	Oxley Vale Attunga	North Armidale			
2012	Tamworth FC	Tamworth FC	North Armidale	Tamworth FC	
2013	Tamworth FC	Tamworth FC	North Armidale	Tamworth FC	
2014	Oxley Vale Attunga	Tamworth FC	Inverell Joeys	Tamworth FC	Inverell Joeys (NNSW quarter-finals)
2015	Oxley Vale Attunga	Oxley Vale Attunga	Inverell Joeys	Oxley Vale Attunga	South Armidale (NNSW Round 6)
2016	Oxley Vale Attunga	Demon Knights		Oxley Vale Attunga	
2017	North Companions	Oxley Vale Attunga		Oxley Vale Attunga	
2018	Tamworth FC	Tamworth FC		Tamworth FC	
2019	Tamworth FC	Tamworth FC		Tamworth FC	
2020	Oxley Vale Attunga	Oxley Vale Attunga		Oxley Vale Attunga	Oxley Vale Attunga (NNSWF 4th Round)
2021	No Grand Final due to COVID	Oxley Vale Attunga		Oxley Vale Attunga	Oxley Vale Attunga (NNSWF 4th Round)
2022	Oxley Vale Attunga	Oxley Vale Attunga		Oxley Vale Attunga	
2023	South Armidale	Oxley Vale Attunga			
2024	Inverell FC	Moore Creek FC	Inverell FC		
2025	Inverell FC	Moore Creek FC	Inverell FC		
