= 2013 Northern NSW State League Division 2 =

Northern NSW State League Division 2
- Season: 2013
- Champions: Adamstown Rosebud FC
- Promoted: Adamstown Rosebud FC
- Matches: 84
- Top goalscorer: Ben Martin (30)
- Biggest home win: Adamstown Rosebud 12-0 Singleton Strikers (6 April 2013)
- Biggest away win: Thornton Redbacks 1-7 Adamstown Rosebud (31 March 2013) West Wallsend 0-6 Adamstown Rosebud (9 June 2013) Thornton Redbacks 0-6 Adamstown Rosebud (6 July 2013)
- Highest scoring: Adamstown Rosebud 12-0 Singleton Strikers (6 April 2013)

Adamstown Rosebud were Minor Premiers as well as the Grand Final winners in 2013. They were promoted to the newly formed NNSW National Premier Leagues for the 2014 season.

== League tables ==
Pos	Team	Pld	W	D	L	GF	GA	GD	Pts	Qualification or relegation
1	Adamstown Rosebud FC (P, C)	21	18	1	2	88	16	+72	55	Promotion to 2014 NNSW NPL
2	Maitland	21	17	2	2	72	16	+56	53	2013 NNSW State League Div 2 Finals
3	Belmont Swansea	21	15	1	5	54	24	+30	46	2013 NNSW State League Div 2 Finals
4	West Wallsend	21	9	0	12	35	51	−16	27	2013 NNSW State League Div 2 Finals
5	Toronto Awaba	21	8	2	11	43	49	−6	26	
6	Thornton Redbacks	21	7	2	12	33	55	−22	23	
7	Cessnock City	21	4	1	16	29	66	−37	13	
8	Singleton Strikers	21	1	1	19	21	98	−77	4	

Updated to match(es) played on 11 August 2013. Source:
Rules for classification: 1) points; 2) goal difference; 3) number of goals scored.
(C) Champions; (P) Promoted

=== Finals ===
Semi-finals
1	Adamstown Rosebud	4	3	7
4	West Wallsend FC	0	0	0
2	Maitland FC	2	4	6
3	Belmont Swansea Utd	0	1	1

Final
1	Adamstown Rosebud	2
2	Maitland FC	1
