= 2015 Dockerty Cup =

2015 FFV Dockerty Cup
Tournament details
- Country: Australia
- Teams: 191

Final positions
- Champions: South Melbourne FC
- Runners-up: Oakleigh Cannons FC

The 2015 Dockerty Cup was a football (soccer) knockout-cup competition held between men's clubs in Victoria, Australia in 2015, the annual edition of the Dockerty Cup. Victorian soccer clubs from the 5 State League Divisions, regional, metros and masters leagues - plus the 12 Clubs from the National Premier Leagues Victoria - competed for the Dockerty Cup trophy.

This knockout competition was won by South Melbourne, a record 8th title.

The competition also served as Qualifying Rounds for the 2015 FFA Cup. In addition to the two Victorian A-League clubs, the four semi-finalists qualified for the final rounds of the 2015 FFA Cup, entering at the Round of 32.

== Format ==
Round	Clubs remaining	Winners from previous round	New entries this round	Main Match Dates
Qualifying Round	191	none	39 (inc. 17 byes)	14 February
Round 1	180	28	60	21 February
Round 2	136	44	36	28 February–1 March
Round 3	96	40	24	7 March
Round 4	64	32	32	15 March
Round 5	32	32	none	15 April
Round 6	16	16	none	5–8 June
Round 7	8	8	none	17–24 June
Semi-Finals	4	4	none	15–16 July
Final	2	2	none	2 August

== Preliminary rounds ==
Victorian clubs, participate in the 2015 FFA Cup via the preliminary rounds. This was open to teams from the National Premier Leagues Victoria, Victorian State League divisions, regional and metros leagues. Teams were seeded in terms of which round they would enter based on their Division in 2015, which are shown in the table for the team's tier.

A total of 191 clubs entered into the competition (one greater than the previous year), and the four qualifiers for the semi-final rounds are:

Semi Finalists and FFA Cup Qualifiers
South Melbourne (2)	Oakleigh Cannons (2)	Heidelberg United (2)	Hume City (2)

== Semi finals ==
A total of four teams took part in this stage of the competition. The draw was held on 26 June, with the matches played on 15–16 July.

Tie no	Home team (tier)	Score	Away team (tier)
1	Heidelberg United FC (2)	1–2	South Melbourne FC (2)
2	Hume City (2)	0–2	Oakleigh Cannons FC (2)

== Final ==
The Final was played at South Melbourne's home ground of Lakeside Stadium on 2 August. Miloš Lujić was named man-of-the-match and received the Jimmy Mackay Medal.

2 August 2015	South Melbourne FC (2)	3–0	Oakleigh Cannons FC (2)	Lakeside Stadium
	Lujić 47', 51'; Minopoulos 59'	Report
