= 2020 National Premier Leagues =

National Premier Leagues
- Season: 2020
- Champions: No Champions (Finals Series cancelled)

The 2020 National Premier Leagues was the eighth season of the Australian National Premier Leagues soccer competition. The league competition was played by eight separate state and territory member federations, namely the ACT, NSW, Northern NSW, Queensland, South Australia, Tasmania, Victoria and Western Australia.

== Effects of the 2019–20 coronavirus pandemic ==
The season commenced in February, with the first games played in the Queensland competition.

The competition was suspended for one month due to the impacts from the COVID-19 pandemic in Australia, effective 18 March to 14 April, and subsequently extended. Apart from Victoria, competitions resumed in the various member federations between late June and late July. In Victoria, preliminary plans for the resumption of competitions for the 2021 season were released in October 2020, confirming that the current season had effectively ended. The South Australian season was temporarily suspended in mid-November for a minimum of two weeks, with the NPLSA in the middle of its finals series.

It was announced on 3 July that the finals series for the 2020 competition had been cancelled.

== League tables ==
=== ACT ===
==== Stage 2 ====
Pos	Team	Pld	W	D	L	GF	GA	GD	Pts	Qualification or relegation (Note: Teams were split into two groups (Top Four and Bottom Four) after the first 7 matches in the first Stage.)
1	Canberra Croatia (C)	3	3	0	0	9	0	+9	9	2020 ACT Grand Final
2	Gungahlin United	3	1	1	1	4	7	−3	4	2020 ACT Grand Final
3	Tigers FC	3	1	0	2	2	6	−4	3	
4	Belconnen United	3	0	1	2	3	5	−2	1	
5	Woden Weston	3	2	1	0	6	2	+4	7	
6	Monaro Panthers	3	2	0	1	9	2	+7	6	
7	Canberra Olympic	3	1	1	1	3	7	−4	4	
8	Tuggeranong United	3	0	0	3	1	8	−7	0	

Source: sportstg.com
Rules for classification: 1) points; 2) goal difference; 3) number of goals scored.
(C) Champions

==== Finals ====
Grand Final
1	Canberra Croatia	3
2	Gungahlin United	1

=== NSW ===
Pos	Team	Pld	W	D	L	GF	GA	GD	Pts	Qualification or relegation
1	Rockdale City Suns	11	7	3	1	20	9	+11	24	2020 NSW Finals
2	Wollongong Wolves	11	8	0	3	24	14	+10	24	2020 NSW Finals
3	Sydney United 58 (C)	11	7	1	3	26	20	+6	22	2020 NSW Finals
4	Sydney Olympic	11	6	3	2	17	10	+7	21	2020 NSW Finals
5	Sydney FC Youth	11	6	1	4	26	19	+7	19	
6	Blacktown City	11	4	3	4	19	15	+4	15	
7	Marconi Stallions	11	4	2	5	14	14	0	14	
8	Manly United	11	3	3	5	14	18	−4	12	
9	North Shore Mariners	11	2	4	5	11	18	−7	10	
10	Mt Druitt Town Rangers	11	2	3	6	11	22	−11	9	
11	Western Sydney Wanderers Youth (R)	11	2	2	7	14	22	−8	8	Temporarily promoted from NPL NSW 2 mid-season (Note: Promoted from NPL2 mid-season due to the withdrawal of Sutherland Sharks. This was a temporary measure for the 2020 season only.)
12	APIA Leichhardt	11	2	1	8	12	27	−15	7	
13	Sutherland Sharks	0	0	0	0	0	0	0	0	Withdrew (Note: Withdrew during the season hiatus caused by the COVID-19 pandemic in Australia.)

Source: sportstg.com
Rules for classification: 1) points; 2) goal difference; 3) number of goals scored.
(C) Champions; (R) Relegated

==== Finals ====
Semi-finals
1	Rockdale City Suns	3
4	Sydney Olympic	0
2	Wollongong Wolves	1
3	Sydney United 58	3

Grand Final
Rockdale City Suns	3 (2)
Sydney United 58	3 (4)

=== Northern NSW ===
Pos	Team	Pld	W	D	L	GF	GA	GD	Pts	Qualification or relegation
1	Edgeworth FC (C)	13	11	0	2	33	8	+25	33	2020 NNSW Finals
2	Broadmeadow Magic	13	8	2	3	29	16	+13	26	2020 NNSW Finals
3	Newcastle Olympic	13	7	2	4	26	18	+8	23	2020 NNSW Finals
4	Charlestown Azzurri	13	7	2	4	16	11	+5	23	2020 NNSW Finals
5	Maitland FC	13	7	1	5	24	16	+8	22	2020 NNSW Finals
6	Lambton Jaffas	13	5	4	4	25	18	+7	19	
7	Weston Workers	13	5	3	5	21	19	+2	18	
8	Valentine Phoenix	13	3	3	7	12	29	−17	12	
9	Adamstown Rosebud	13	1	2	10	11	40	−29	5	
10	Lake Macquarie City	13	1	1	11	11	33	−22	4	

Source: sportstg.com
Rules for classification: 1) points; 2) goal difference; 3) number of goals scored.
(C) Champions

==== Finals ====
Qualifying final
2	Broadmeadow Magic	3
3	Newcastle Olympic	1
4	Charlestown Azzurri	1 (3)
5	Maitland FC (p)	1 (5)

Major semi-final
1	Edgeworth FC	3 (4)
2	Broadmeadow Magic	3 (3)
Minor semi-final
3	Newcastle Olympic	0
5	Maitland FC	4

Preliminary final
2	Broadmeadow Magic	0
5	Maitland FC	2

Grand final
1	Edgeworth FC	1
5	Maitland FC	0

=== Queensland ===
Pos	Team	Pld	W	D	L	GF	GA	GD	Pts	Qualification or relegation (Note: Games against Mackay & Whitsundays Magpies Crusaders United now counted as byes.)
1	Peninsula Power	24	19	1	4	54	25	+29	58	2020 Queensland Finals
2	Olympic FC	24	16	5	3	54	21	+33	53	2020 Queensland Finals
3	Gold Coast Knights	24	15	6	3	57	27	+30	51	2020 Queensland Finals
4	Lions FC (C)	24	14	4	6	64	26	+38	46	2020 Queensland Finals
5	Moreton Bay United	24	9	5	10	46	55	−9	32	
6	Brisbane Strikers	24	7	7	10	33	42	−9	28	
7	Eastern Suburbs	24	7	8	9	46	50	−4	29	
8	Brisbane Roar Youth	24	9	3	12	42	41	+1	30	
9	Sunshine Coast Wanderers	24	7	4	13	41	55	−14	25	
10	Redlands United	24	7	2	15	32	64	−32	23	
11	Gold Coast United	24	5	8	11	37	47	−10	23	
12	Capalaba	24	6	2	16	35	72	−37	20	
13	Brisbane City (R)	24	5	5	14	37	53	−16	20	Relegation to the 2021 Queensland Premier League
14	Magpies Crusaders United (W)	0	0	0	0	0	0	0	0	Withdrew (Note: Withdrew during the season hiatus caused by the COVID-19 pandemic in Australia.)

Source: sportstg.com
Rules for classification: 1) points; 2) number of wins; 3) goal difference; 4) number of goals scored.
(C) Champions; (R) Relegated; (W) Withdrew

==== Finals ====
Semi-finals
2	Olympic FC	2
3	Gold Coast Knights	1
1	Peninsula Power	1
4	Lions FC	4

Grand Final
Olympic FC	0
Lions FC	1

=== South Australia ===
Pos	Team	Pld	W	D	L	GF	GA	GD	Pts	Qualification or relegation
1	Adelaide Comets	22	14	2	6	45	24	+21	44	2020 National Premier Leagues SA Finals
2	Campbelltown City (C)	22	13	4	5	36	27	+9	43	2020 National Premier Leagues SA Finals
3	North Eastern MetroStars	22	12	5	5	52	32	+20	41	2020 National Premier Leagues SA Finals
4	Croydon Kings	22	11	3	8	42	32	+10	36	2020 National Premier Leagues SA Finals
5	Adelaide Raiders	22	9	7	6	30	27	+3	34	2020 National Premier Leagues SA Finals
6	Adelaide City	22	8	7	7	27	23	+4	31	2020 National Premier Leagues SA Finals
7	Cumberland United	22	9	4	9	31	43	−12	31	
8	Adelaide Olympic	22	8	4	10	32	32	0	28	
9	Adelaide Blue Eagles	22	6	9	7	25	27	−2	27	
10	Adelaide United Youth	22	5	9	8	26	30	−4	24	
11	Modbury Jets (R)	22	4	4	14	23	48	−25	16	Relegation to SA State League 1
12	Para Hills Knights (R)	22	3	2	17	18	42	−24	11	Relegation to SA State League 1

Source: mygameday
Rules for classification: 1) points; 2) goal difference; 3) number of goals scored.
(C) Champions; (R) Relegated

==== Finals ====
Elimination finals
4	Croydon Kings	2
5	Adelaide Raiders	0
3	North Eastern MetroStars	1
6	Adelaide City	4

Semifinals
1	Adelaide Comets	0	3
2	Campbelltown City	0	0
4	Croydon Kings	1
6	Adelaide City	3

Preliminary final
2	Campbelltown City	4
6	Adelaide City	0

Grand final
1	Adelaide Comets	1
2	Campbelltown City	3

=== Tasmania ===
Pos	Team	Pld	W	D	L	GF	GA	GD	Pts
1	Devonport City (C)	14	13	1	0	28	9	+19	40
2	Glenorchy Knights	14	10	1	3	37	13	+24	31
3	South Hobart	14	7	2	5	30	24	+6	23
4	Kingborough Lions United	14	6	3	5	26	34	−8	21
5	Olympia Warriors	14	6	1	7	32	27	+5	19
6	Clarence Zebras	14	4	2	8	20	32	−12	14
7	Riverside Olympic	14	2	3	9	17	32	−15	9
8	Launceston City	14	1	1	12	13	32	−19	4

Source: GameDay and Walter Pless
Rules for classification: 1) Points; 2) Goal difference; 3) Goals scored
(C) Champions

=== Victoria ===
Pos	Team	Pld	W	D	L	GF	GA	GD	Pts
1	Hume City	5	5	0	0	11	3	+8	15
2	Oakleigh Cannons	5	3	1	1	11	6	+5	10
3	Dandenong Thunder	5	3	1	1	9	7	+2	10
4	Avondale	5	4	0	1	14	4	+10	9 (Note: Avondale were deducted 3 points for breach of regulations.)
5	Heidelberg United	5	3	0	2	10	6	+4	9
6	Port Melbourne	5	2	3	0	8	4	+4	9
7	St Albans Saints	5	2	3	0	7	3	+4	9
8	South Melbourne	5	1	3	1	7	7	0	6
9	Green Gully	5	2	0	3	7	9	−2	6
10	Bentleigh Greens	5	1	2	2	4	3	+1	5
11	Melbourne Knights	5	0	2	3	7	16	−9	2
12	Dandenong City	5	0	1	4	4	10	−6	1
13	Eastern Lions	5	0	1	4	2	12	−10	1
14	Altona Magic	5	0	1	4	2	13	−11	1

Source: sportstg.com
Rules for classification: 1) Points; 2) Goal difference; 3) Goals scored

=== Western Australia ===
Pos	Team	Pld	W	D	L	GF	GA	GD	Pts	Qualification or relegation (Note: Teams were split into two groups (Upper Table and Lower Table) after each played 11 matches in the first Stage.)
1	ECU Joondalup (C)	5	3	1	1	15	4	+11	10	Finals series
2	Cockburn City	5	3	1	1	11	8	+3	10	Finals series
3	Floreat Athena	5	3	0	2	9	6	+3	9	Finals series
4	Gwelup Croatia	5	2	1	2	10	7	+3	7	
5	Sorrento	5	1	1	3	6	16	−10	4	
6	Armadale	5	1	0	4	7	17	−10	3	
7	Perth SC	5	3	1	1	15	5	+10	10	Finals series
8	Balcatta	5	3	0	2	10	8	+2	9	
9	Perth Glory Youth	5	2	2	1	8	6	+2	8	
10	Inglewood United	5	2	1	2	7	6	+1	7	
11	Bayswater City	5	2	1	2	6	10	−4	7	
12	Rockingham City	5	0	1	4	4	15	−11	1	

Source: Upper table (sportstg.com) Lower table (sportstg.com)
Rules for classification: 1) points; 2) goal difference; 3) number of goals scored.
(C) Champions

==== Finals ====
Semi-finals
U1	ECU Joondalup	1
L1	Perth SC (a.e.t.)	3
U2	Cockburn City	0
U3	Floreat Athena	2

Grand Final
L1	Perth SC	0
U2	Floreat Athena	4
