= Frenchville FC =

- Full name: Frenchville Sports Club
- Nickname(s): Roos
- Founded: 1948
- Ground: Ryan Park, Rockhampton
- League: Central Queensland Premier League
- 2
Home colours	Away colours

Frenchville FC is a football club based in Rockhampton, Queensland. The club was established in 1948. They competed in the 1979 and 1980 Queensland State League seasons. They currently compete in the Central Queensland Premier League.
