= Lake Macquarie Regional Football Facility =

Football facility in Speers Point, New South Wales

- Interactive map of Lake Macquarie Regional Football Facility
- Location: Speers Point, NSW, Australia
- Coordinates: 32°57′35″S 151°37′8.2″E
- Owner: Northern NSW Football and the NSW State Government Hunter Infrastructure & Investment Fund
- Operator: Northern NSW Football

Construction
- Groundbreaking: 28 March 2014
- Built: 2014
- Opened: 26 November 2014; 11 years ago
- Cost: AUD $11.3 million (2014)
- Architect: ADW Johnson Pty Ltd
- Project manager: ADW Johnson Pty Ltd

Tenants
- Newcastle Jets Youth 2020–Present (NSW League One); Emerging Jets Academy 2020–Present; Newcastle Croatia 2026–Present (Northern League One)

Website
- Lake Macquarie Regional Football Facility

The Lake Macquarie Regional Football Facility (LMRFF) is a football facility located in Speers Point, NSW.

Developed in 2014, it consists of:

- 2 full-size synthetic football fields,
- 10 five-a-side football fields,
- an administration building,
- a 120-space vehicle parking area and associated infrastructure.

== Australia Cup ==
LMRFF is the host for the NNSW Australia Cup Qualifying final rounds. The inaugural event at the facility was played on the weekend of 20–21 June 2015. From 2024 onward, LMRFF hosts the NNSWF State Cup Final.

== Newcastle Jets ==
On May 21 2015, it was announced that the LMRFF would become the training facility for A-League team, the Newcastle Jets. This coincided with FFA taking ownership of the club. The team had previously trained at Ray Watt Oval at the University of Newcastle.

== Craig Johnston Building ==
The main building at the LMRFF was named after former Liverpool FC footballer, Craig Johnston, on 22 November 2023. Johnston grew up in Boolaroo and Speers Point, where the LMRFF is located, before he left home as a 15-year-old. The building, officially opened in 2020, was part of stage two of the $14.5 million LMRFF Project.
