= Yagoona Lions FC =

- Full name: Yagoona Lions Football Club
- Nickname: Lions
- Founded: 1956
- Ground: O'Neill Park, Yagoona, Sydney
- Capacity: 2000
- Manager: Steve Bazevski
- League: MPL 1st Grade
- Website: http://www.yagoonalionsfc.com
Home colours	Away colours

Yagoona Lions FC (formerly Yagoona Districts,) (Yagoona Macedonia) is a football club formed by Macedonian settlers based in the suburb of Yagoona, Bankstown, Australia, playing their home games at O'Neill Park

== History ==
Founded in 1956 by Scottish migrants, Yagoona Districts was formed with minimal success. The club was close to folding until in 1975, Macedonian immigrants founded Yagoona Macedonia where they competed in their first domestic season, and their first recorded game by the Bankstown Soccer Federation was against Padstow. As the years passed, so did the players and new faces began to emerge in the ever-growing Macedonian-Australian Sydney-based club.

The club began playing in the Inter Urban 5th Division and won the title in just their second year, later getting promoted to 3rd Division and claiming another title in 1987. Their first recorded game by the Bankstown Soccer Federation was against Padstow.

In 1989 the club changed to its current name of Yagoona Lions (after Yagoona Macedonia formed into Sydney Macedonia), adding the Macedonian symbol of the Lion as their badge, as well as adopting its recognisable red and black colours.

The club initially had little success after this period until about 2000 when they won their first major trophy in the form of the Premiership of the Alliance League. This was the beginning of a great period of success for the club which in 2006 also won the treble with a Premier League Minor Premiership, Grand Final and NSW Champions of Champions.

Yagoona saw further success in 2008 winning the NSW State Cup and Minor Premiership, then in the following 2009 season claiming the Minor Premiership and NSW Champions of Champions. 2010 and 2011 brought successive Minor Premiership and Grand Final wins.

Yagoona also won the Masters Division of the 2019 Maso Cup in Queanbeyan.

In 2023, Yagoona won their 6th league title since 2000.

== Current squad ==
=== First team squad ===
As of 6 March 2025

Note: Flags indicate national team as defined under FIFA eligibility rules; some limited exceptions apply. Players may hold more than one non-FIFA nationality.

No.	Pos.	Nation	Player
—	GK	AUS	Marcello Gonzalez
—	DF	AUS	Steve Kotevski
—	DF	AUS	Adam Manoski
—	DF	AUS	Enoch Benne
—	DF	AUS	Jayme Trenkoski
—	DF	AUS	Matthew Zvezdakoski
—	MF	AUS	Kent Nguyen
—	MF	AUS	Benne Owusu

No.	Pos.	Nation	Player
—	MF	AUS	Andre Novaceski
—	MF	BRA	Nicolas Alves
—	MF	AUS	Shayne Ardle
—	MF	BRA	Paulo Marques
—	FW	AUS	Joshua Briskoski
—	FW	AUS	Jamie Bazevski
—	FW	AUS	Nathan Cakovski
—	FW	AUS	Tommy Markovski

== Honours ==
- Bankstown Premier League: 2006, 2010, 2011
- Bankstown Premier League Minor Premiers: 2006, 2008, 2009, 2010, 2011, 2015, 2016, 2020, 2023
- NSW Champions of Champions (Mens): 2006, 2009
- NSW State Cup: 2008
- Bankstown Alliance League: 2000, 2008
- NSW Suburban 2nd Division: 1972
- NSW Suburban 3rd Division: 1969, 1987
