= Alstonville FC =

- Nickname: Villa
- Founded: 1972
- Ground: Crawford Park and Geoff Watt Oval
- League: FFNC Premier League
- 2023: 5th
- Website: http://www.alstonvillefc.com.au/
Home colours	Away colours

Alstonville Football Club are an Australian soccer club from Alstonville, New South Wales, Australia. The club was founded in 1972 as the Alstonville Junior Soccer Club.

The club plays at Crawford Park in Alstonville and wear Red and Black Striped Shirts and are nicknamed 'Villa.' The club competes in the Football Far North Coast Premier League.

== FFNC Premier League ==
Alstonville FC have been playing in the Football Far North Coast Premier League since 1972. However, have only made the end of year finals series once in the 2014 season where they finished fifth. The club were knocked out in the first week of the finals where they lost to fourth-placed Lismore Thistles 1–0. In 2015, the club finished in a secure seventh place. In the 2016 FFNC Premier League season, Alstonville finished in eighth place.

In the COVID-19 shortened 2020 FFNC Premier League season, Alstonville, under the coaching of Dave Gambley came 3rd, their highest ever finish in the FFNC Premier League.

== FFA Cup ==
The club has entered into the FFA Cup on two occasions.

The club's first attempt in 2015 was their most successful advancing to the Fifth Round of the Northern New South Wales Qualifying after wins against fellow FFNC member clubs Lennox Head (3–1) and Goonellabah (5–0). The club was knocked out in the fifth round after a heavy 8–4 loss against North Coast Football giants Coffs City United Lions.

The club entered the Cup again in 2017 where they picked up a first round win against First Division side Ballina 4–1. They were then knocked out by Bangalow in the next round 2–1.
