= South Armidale United FC =

- Founded: 1994
- Ground: Armidale Sportsground
- Capacity: 3,500
- Head coach: Sam Fisher
- League: Sport UNE Football League
- Website: www.southarmidalefc.com
Home colours	Away colours

South Armidale United Football Club is a football club based in Armidale, Australia.

It has a long running rivalry with East Armidale and Norths Utd, the former due to the circumstances surrounding its formation and that latter due to some on-field incidents in the mid-1990s. The club's song is "Yellow" by Coldplay, and its victory song is a reworded version of the Beatles classic, "Yellow Submarine".

== History ==
The club was founded in 1994 by a group of disaffected members of the East Armidale Football Club.

The club is supported by The Royal Hotel Armidale and New England Toyota and continues to enjoy strong community support from local businesses.

In the first year of its inception it reached the Grand Final of the Armidale & District Football Association (ADFA). Since that time the club has secured minor premierships in the regional competition, the Northern Inland Premier League, and won the Reserve Grade major premiership on two occasions. It won its way through to the Grand Final of the Northern Inland Premier League in 2014, ultimately losing to Oxley Vale Attunga FC (Tamworth) in the final.

The Club won the Northern Inland Football Cup on 4 May 2015, defeating Tamworth side, North Companions FC following a penalty shootout.

South Armidale Utd FC featured in the Northern NSW Football playoffs in the 2015 FFA Cup, after defeating the Football Mid North Coast Cup Champions, Forster Tuncurry Tigers FC, 2–1 in Tuncurry.

Broadmeadow Magic FC defeated South Armidale 7–1 at the Lake Macquarie Football Facility on 20 June 2015, ending the Scorpions' FFA Cup run. The Scorpions trailed 3–1 at half-time with Cody Watts scoring for the Yellow and Green from the penalty spot.

== Current squad ==
As of 5 May 2021

Note: Flags indicate national team as defined under FIFA eligibility rules; some limited exceptions apply. Players may hold more than one non-FIFA nationality.

No.	Pos.	Nation	Player
—	GK	AUS	William “gone home early” Wald
—	GK	AUS	Jaiden “bonglord” Stevens
—	MF	AUS	Joshua Frost
—	DF	IND	Ruwan Cooper
—	DF	AUS	Michael Forster
—	ANY	AUS	Joshua “Skip” Frost
—	DF	AUS	Paul Wright
—	MF	AUS	Kaleb “The Hammer” Morhaus
—	FW	VIR	Josh “MD” Stace
—	DF	GRE	Ari 'game changer' Georkas
—	FW	AUS	Jaime Wright
—	FW	AUS	Dom “Bomb” Waters
—	FW	AUS	Gus “My Knee” Wheatley

No.	Pos.	Nation	Player
—	MF	AUS	Tom Campbell
—	DF	AUS	Christopher Hueston
—	MF	AUS	Joshua “Reserve grade” Tanner
—	FW	AUS	Ryan MacDonald
—	DF	AUS	Michael Lord
—	MF	AUS	Hayden Westcott
—	FW	AUS	Ben Laurie
—	DF	AUS	Derek Lowe
—	FW	AUS	Jordan Watts
—	MF	AUS	Steve Berder
—	MF	AUS	Paul Woodford Jnr
—	FW	GRE	Liam 'Lily said No' Georkas

== Achievements ==
- Northern Inland Premier League Grand Final
  - Winners: 2023
  - Runners-up: 2005, 2014
- Northern Inland Premier League Minor Premiers
  - Winners: 2005
- Northern Inland Premier League Reserves Grand Final
  - Winners: 2002, 2013
- Mann Cup
  - Winners: 2007
- Northern Inland Football Cup
  - Winners: 2015
- East Armidale FC & South Armidale Utd FC Annual Charity Shield
  - Winners: 2015
- FFA Cup
  - Sixth Round: 2015
- Sport UNE Football League 1st Division
  - Winners: 2020
- Sport UNE Football League 2nd Division
  - Winners: 2020
