= Singleton Strikers FC =

- Full name: Singleton Strikers FC
- Nickname: Wildhogs
- Founded: 1978
- Ground: Howe Park
- Coordinates: 32°33′49.5″S 151°10′55.7″E
- President: Deano Dunn
- Head Coach: Doug West
- League: NNSW State League 1
- 2025: 4th of 10
- Website: http://singletonstrikers.com.au
Home colours

Singleton Strikers Football Club is a semi-professional football club based in Singleton in the Hunter Region, New South Wales. Singleton Strikers currently compete in the Northern NSW State League Division 1 with teams in First Grade, Reserve Grade and U'18s.

The Northern NSW State League Division 1 is the second tier of football in NNSW below the National Premier Leagues Northern NSW.

The Singleton Strikers were crowned champions in the 2020 season, defeating New Lambton 2-0 in the grand final at Magic Park, Captained by the leagues Player of The Year Hayden Nichols. COYS
