= Northern NSW Football =

Governing body for soccer in northern New South Wales

- Abbreviation: NNSW
- Formation: 1887; 139 years ago
- Type: Sporting association in NSW
- Headquarters: Lake Macquarie Regional Football Facility
- Location: Speers Point
- Region served: Northern NSW
- Affiliations: Football Australia
- Website: www.northernnswfootball.com.au

Northern NSW Football (NNSWF) is the governing federation for soccer in northern New South Wales, Australia. It is a Federation Member of the national governing body, Football Australia (FA). The Federation's origins date back to the formation of the Northern District British Football Association on 26 June 1887. To align with the international football identity, the federation was re-branded to Northern NSW Football on 25 October 2006.

== Formation and early history ==
The Northern British Football Association was formed at a meeting of clubs at the Criterion Hotel, Newcastle on Sunday 26 June 1887.

The clubs which formed the association were Minmi Rangers (1886), Hamilton Athletic (1886), Greta Blue Bells (1887), Carrington Black Watch (1887), Wallsend Rovers (1887) and Glebe Black Watch, later renamed Burwood United (1887).

It was part of the NSW Football Association before Sydney clubs broke away in 1958, leading to the creation of the Northern NSW Soccer Federation by Newcastle and Coalfields clubs.

In 1959 the Northern First Division Competition was established with 12 teams: Adamstown, Awaba, Blacksmith Rangers, Cardiff, Cessnock, Charlestown United, Lake Macquarie, Mayfield United, Merewether Advance, Newcastle Austral, Wallsend and West Wallsend.

== Organisational changes ==
In 1980, the Northern NSW Soccer Federation Ltd was registered as a company, and in 2006, it was rebranded to Northern NSW Football due to internal restructuring.

== Membership structure ==
NNSWF is the governing body for football in the northern regions of New South Wales and have seven member zones responsible for 208 football clubs.

The Zones are:

- Football Far North Coast
- Football Mid North Coast
- Hunter Valley Football
- Macquarie Football
- Newcastle Football
- North Coast Football
- Northern Inland Football (The Northern Inland region was absorbed by Northern NSW Football. Whilst they still have equivalent voting rights to the remaining members, they are part of Northern NSW Football)

== Competitions and leagues ==
NNSW Men's Promotion and Relegation
Level	League(s)/Division(s)
1	NPL NNSW; 12 clubs ↓ 1.5 relegations
2	Northern League One; 10 clubs ↑ 1.5 promotions ↓ 1 relegations
3	Zone League One; 12 clubs ↑ 1 promotions ↓ 1 relegations
4	Zone League Two; 12 clubs ↑ 1 promotions ↓ 1 relegations
5	Zone League Three; 11 clubs 2025, 12 clubs 2026 ↑ 1 promotions

=== National Premier Leagues Northern NSW ===
The National Premier Leagues Northern NSW (NPL NNSW), is the premier competition in Northern NSW involving 12 clubs from within the Hunter Region. The competition consists of 1st Grade & Reserve Grade.

=== Northern League One ===
The Northern League One is the second highest division in the NNSW league system involving 10 clubs from within the Hunter Region. The competition consists of 1st Grade & Reserve Grade.

=== Zone Leagues ===
The Zone Leagues consist of three divisions Zone League One with 12 clubs, Zone League Two with 10 clubs and Zone League Three with 10 clubs.

=== NPL Women's NNSW ===
The NPL Women's NNSW competition started in 2022 and is the premier women’s competition in Northern NSW involving 7 clubs from within the Hunter Region.

=== Regional Super League ===
The NNSW Regional Super League was established in 2025 to create more competitive opportunities for regional clubs and players, provide a sustainable pathway for talented regional players and increase player retention and engagement.

The NNSW Regional Super League features teams from three of NNSWF's regional member zones.

==== The 2025 men’s NNSW Regional Super League ====
Inverell FC, Armidale City Westside FC, Woolgoolga United FC, Northern Storm FC, Urunga FC, Port United FC, Macleay Valley Rangers FC and Port Saints FC.

==== The 2025 women's NNSW Regional Super League ====
Tamworth FC, Oxley Vale Attunga FC, Armidale City Westside FC, Coffs City United FC, Urunga FC, Port United FC, Macleay Valley Rangers FC and Lake Cathie FC.

=== NNSWF Premier Youth League ===
The NNSWF Premier Youth League has been designed to enhance the talented player pathway, enable more competitive football for young players and facilitate more games of like versus like for Under 18's, Under 16's, Under 15's, Under 14's and Under 13's.

All Premier Competitions clubs that meet the criteria, including regional football programs Mid Coast FC, North Coast Football and Northern Inland Academy of Sport Football Club (NIAS FC) are involved.

At the start of the season, the top four clubs from PYL B will join the eight clubs in PYL A to establish PYL 1.

The bottom four clubs in PYL B will join the eight clubs from PYL C to form PYL 2, prior to splitting into PYL A, B and C again halfway through the season.

=== Junior Development League ===
The Junior Development League provides a pathway for talented junior players from U9’s to U12’s in the best possible learning environment. Clubs competing in the National Premier Leagues or the Northern League One competitions and regional football programs Mid Coast FC, North Coast Football and NIAS are involved.

The Junior Development League is non-competitive and focuses instead on individual skill development.

==== 2026 Junior Development League – approved clubs ====
Boys		Girls	
Club	JDL Status	Club	JDL Status
Broadmeadow Magic	Gold	Lake Macquarie City	Gold
Central Coast United	Gold	Maitland	Gold
Cooks Hill United	Gold	Valentine	Gold
Edgeworth	Gold	Adamstown Rosebud	Silver
Lake Macquarie City	Gold	Charlestown Azzuri	Silver
Lambton Jaffas	Gold	New Lambton	Silver
Maitland	Gold	Broadmeadow Magic	Bronze
New Lambton	Gold	Kahibah	Bronze
Newcastle Olympic	Gold	Newcastle Olympic	Bronze
Valentine	Gold		
Weston	Gold		
Belmont Swansea United	Silver		
South Cardiff	Silver		
Toronto Awaba	Silver		
Adamstown Rosebud	Bronze		
Charlestown Azzuri	Bronze		
Kahibah	Bronze		
Northern Inland Rangers	Bronze		
Singleton Strikers	Bronze		
Wallsend	Bronze		
West Wallsend	Bronze		

== Past winners ==
=== Newcastle and Northern District – 1886 to 1927 ===
Season	Premiers	Champions	Score	Runners up	Cup Winner
1886	Hamilton Athletic	Minmi Rangers	1–0	Hamilton Athletic	Minmi Rangers (Ellis Cup)
1887	Minmi Rangers	No Finals held			Minmi Rangers (Ellis Cup)
1888	Minmi Rangers	No Finals held			Minmi Rangers (Ellis Cup)
1889	Minmi Rangers	No Finals held			Wallsend Rovers
1890	Burwood United	Minmi Rangers	2–1	Burwood United	Minmi Rangers (Ellis Cup)
1891	Minmi Rangers	No Finals held			Burwood United (Ellis Cup)
1892	Minmi Rangers	No Finals held			Minmi Rangers (Ellis Cup and Gardiner Cup)
1893	Minmi Rangers	No Finals held			Minmi Rangers (Ellis Cup)
1894	Adamstown Rosebud	Adamstown Rosebud			Adamstown Rosebud (Ellis Cup)
1895	Adamstown Rosebud	Adamstown Rosebud			Minmi Rangers (Ellis Cup)
1896	Adamstown Rosebud	Adamstown Rosebud	5–1	Merewether Advance	Adamstown Rosebud
1897	Wallsend Rovers	West Wallsend	1–0	Wallsend Rovers	–
1898	West Wallsend	West Wallsend	2–0	Minmi Rangers	Minmi Rangers
1899	West Wallsend	West Wallsend	1–0	Adamstown Rosebud	West Wallsend
1900	Wallsend Rovers	Wallsend Rovers	5–2	West Wallsend	West Wallsend (Ellis Cup and Gardiner Cups)
1901		No Finals held			West Wallsend (Ellis Cup and Gardiner Cups)
1902	West Wallsend	No Finals held			–
1903	Wallsend Royals	Wallsend Royals	3–1	Adamstown Rosebud	Adamstown Rosebud
1904	West Wallsend	No Finals held			–
1905	Adamstown Rosebud	Adamstown Rosebud	7–3	Adamstown Shamrocks	–
1906	Merewether Advance	Adamstown Rosebud	2–1	Merewether Advance	–
1907	Pelaw Main	Pelaw Main			Adamstown Rosebud (Gardiner Cup) Broadmeadow R.A. (Ellis Cup)
1908	Adamstown Rosebud	No Finals held			Adamstown Rosebud (Ellis Cup)
1909	Adamstown Rosebud	Adamstown Rosebud			Adamstown Rosebud (Gardiner Cup)
1910	Adamstown Rosebud	Adamstown Rosebud			–
1911 East	Merewether Advance	Cessnock	2–1	Merewether Advance	
1911 West	Wallsend Mazeppa	Wallsend Mazeppa	2–0	Minmi Starlights	
1912	Cessnock	Cessnock	1–0	West Wallsend	–
1913	Merewether Advance	West Wallsend	2–1	Merewether Advance	Merewether Advance (Ellis Cup)
1914	Merewether Advance	Merewether Advance	3–0	West Wallsend	Merewether Advance (Knockout Cup)
1915	Merewether Advance	Merewether Advance	2–1	Cessnock	Merewether Advance (Kerr Cup)
1916	Weston	Weston Bears			–
1917	Wallsend Rovers / Weston Albion	Wallsend Rovers	2–0	Weston Albion	–
1918	Wallsend Rovers	Wallsend Rovers	4–0	Adamstown Rosebud	West Wallsend (Kerr Cup)
1919	West Wallsend	West Wallsend	4–1	Hamilton	West Wallsend (Kerr Cup)
1920	West Wallsend	Adamstown Rosebud	1–0	Wallsend Rovers	West Wallsend (Kerr Cup)
1921	West Wallsend	West Wallsend	2–0	Cessnock	West Wallsend (Gardiner Cup), Wallsend Royals (Kerr Cup)
1922	West Wallsend	West Wallsend	4–2	Cessnock	West Wallsend (Kerr Cup)
1923	Wallsend Rovers	Weston Bears	3–1	Adamstown Rosebud	West Wallsend (Gardiner Cup), Cessnock (Kerr Cup)
1924	Cessnock	West Wallsend	3–1	Wallsend Rovers	West Wallsend (Gardiner Cup and Kerr Cup)
1925	West Wallsend	Cessnock	2–1	Adamstown Rosebud	Adamstown Rosebud (Kerr Cup)
1926	West Wallsend	Cessnock	1–0	West Wallsend	Adamstown Rosebud (Kerr Cup)
1927	Cessnock	Cessnock	2–0	Adamstown Rosebud	Cessnock (Kerr Cup)

=== NSW State League – 1928 to 1958 ===
Season	Premiers	Champions	Score	Runners up	Cup Winner
1928	West Wallsend	New Lambton	1–0	Adamstown Rosebud	–
1929	Cessnock	Abedare	2–0	Weston	–
1930	Adamstown Rosebud	No Final Series			Adamstown Rosebud (NSW State Cup)
1931	Weston (North) Leichhardt Annandale (South)	Weston Bears			West Wallsend (NSW State Cup)
1932	Wallsend (North) Concord (South)	Wallsend			Weston Bears (NSW State Cup)
1933	Wallsend (North) St. George (South)	Wallsend			–
1934	Adamstown Rosebud	No Final Series			Weston Bears (NSW State Cup)
1935	Adamstown Rosebud	Adamstown Rosebud			–
1936	Weston Bears	Weston Bears			Weston Bears (NSW State Cup)
1937	Goodyear	Goodyear		Wallsend (NSW State Cup)	
1938	Goodyear	Wallsend			–
1939	Goodyear	Metters			Weston Bears (NSW State Cup)
1940	Metters	Adamstown Rosebud			–
1941	Metters	Wallsend			–
1942	Wallsend (North); Leichhardt-Annandale (South)	Wallsend			Wallsend (NSW State Cup)
1943	Wallsend	Wallsend			Merewether (NSW State Cup)
1944	Metters	Wallsend			Merewether (NSW State Cup), Wallsend (NSW State League Cup)
1945	Wallsend (North); Canterbury-Bankstown (South)	Canterbury-Bankstown			West Wallsend (NSW State League Cup)
1946	West Wallsend (North); Leichhardt-Annandale (South)	Leichhardt-Annandale			–
1947	Lake Macquarie City (North); Leichhardt-Annandale (South)	Lake Macquarie City			–
1948	Adamstown Rosebud (North); Leichhardt-Annandale (South)	Adamstown Rosebud			–
1949	Leichhardt-Annandale	Leichhardt-Annandale			–
1950	Leichhardt-Annandale	Leichhardt-Annandale			Wallsend (NSW State League Cup)
1951	Wallsend	Wallsend			–
1952	Wallsend (North); Granville (South)	Granville			West Wallsend (NSW State League Cup)
1953	East Lakes (North); Granville (South)	Wallsend			–
1954	Cessnock (North); Corrimal Rangers (South)	Cessnock			–
1955	Cessnock (North); Corrimal Rangers (South)	Corrimal Rangers			–
1956	Cessnock (North); Leichhardt-Annandale (South)	Cessnock			–
1957	Corrimal Rangers	Wallsend			West Wallsend (NSW State League Cup)
1958	EPT (Electrical Power Transmission)	Leichhardt-Annandale			Toronto-Awaba (NSW State League Cup)

=== Northern First Division – 1959 to 1997 ===
Season	Premiers	Champions	Score	Runners up	Cup Winner
1959	Wallsend	Wallsend	4–0	West Wallsend	
1960	Cessnock	Cessnock	2–0	Wallsend	Wallsend Rovers (Ampol Cup)
1961	Awaba	Adamstown Rosebud	2–0	Lake Macquarie City	Wallsend Rovers (Ampol Cup)
1962	Adamstown Rosebud	Lake Macquarie City	5–0	Awaba	Lake Macquarie City (Ampol Cup), Cessnock (Craven Cup)
1963	Wallsend	Awaba	4–1 (a.e.t.)	Wallsend	Wallsend Rovers (Ampol Cup), Austral United (Craven Cup)
1964	Lake Macquarie City	Awaba	4–2	Wallsend	Wallsend Rovers (Ampol Cup), Austral United (Craven Cup)
1965	Wallsend	Wallsend	3–1	Adamstown Rosebud	Lake Macquarie City FC (Ampol Cup), Wallsend Rovers (Craven Cup)
1966	Adamstown Rosebud	Austral United	2–1 (a.e.t.)	Adamstown Rosebud	Austral United (Ampol Cup), Toronto Awaba (Craven Cup)
1967	Austral United	Lake Macquarie City	6–2 (a.e.t.)	Austral United	Belmont Swansea (Ampol Cup and Craven Cup)
1968	Adamstown Rosebud	Adamstown Rosebud	4–2	Lake Macquarie City	
1969	Hamilton Azzuri	Austral United	3–2	Weston Bears	
1970	Adamstown Rosebud	Belmont Swansea United	4–3	Adamstown Rosebud	
1971	Weston Bears	Weston Bears	5–0	Wallsend	
1972	Weston Bears	Weston Bears	3–0	Toronto Awaba	
1973	Weston Bears	Weston Bears	4–1	Adamstown Rosebud	
1974	New Lambton South	Weston Bears	3–2	Adamstown Rosebud	
1975	Adamstown Rosebud	Adamstown Rosebud	2–1 (a.e.t.)	Weston Bears	
1976	Adamstown Rosebud	Adamstown Rosebud	3–0	Wallsend	
1977	Weston Bears	Weston Bears	1–0	Edgeworth Eagles	
1978	Edgeworth Eagles	Edgeworth Eagles	2–0	Weston Bears	
1979	Edgeworth Eagles	Highfields Azzuri	3–2	Weston Bears	
1980	Maitland	Maitland	5–1	Highfields Azzuri	
1981	Highfields Azzuri	Highfields Azzuri	2–1	Maitland	
1982	Lake Macquarie City	Weston Bears	2–0	West Wallsend	
1983	Central Coast	Weston Bears	3–0	Central Coast	
1984	Cardiff Tigers	Weston Bears	0–0 (7–5(p))	West Wallsend	
1985	Belmont-Swansea United	West Wallsend	2–1	Belmont-Swansea United	
1986	West Wallsend	Belmont-Swansea United	0–0 (4–2(p))	West Wallsend	
1987	Adamstown Rosebud	Austral United	3–2	Adamstown Rosebud	
1988	Adamstown Rosebud	West Wallsend	2–1	Adamstown Rosebud	
1989	Adamstown Rosebud	Weston Bears	1–0	Adamstown Rosebud	
1990	Adamstown Rosebud	Weston Bears	1–1 (4–3(p))	Adamstown Rosebud	
1991	Adamstown Rosebud	Adamstown Rosebud	1–1 (5–4(p))	Weston Bears	
1992	Highfields Azzuri	West Wallsend	2–1	Wickham Park Croatia	
1993	Highfields Azzuri	Highfields Azzuri	3–0	Lake Macquarie City	
1994	Highfields Azzuri	Highfields Azzuri	2–1	Wickham Park Croatia	
1995	Highfields Azzuri	Weston Bears	5–0	Wallsend	
1996	Weston Bears	Highfields Azzuri	3–2	Weston Bears	
1997	Broadmeadow Magic	Highfields Azzuri	3–1	Broadmeadow Magic	

=== NNSW State League – 1998 to 2013 ===
Season	Premiers	Champions	Score	Runners up	Cup Winner
1998	Edgeworth Eagles	Hamilton Olympic	2–1	Broadmeadow Magic	
1999	Edgeworth Eagles	Hamilton Olympic	4–0	Adamstown Rosebud	
2000	Edgeworth Eagles	Hamilton Olympic	3–0	Edgeworth Eagles	
2001	Broadmeadow Magic	Hamilton Olympic	2–0	Highfields Azzuri	
2002	Edgeworth Eagles	Highfields Azzuri	1–0 (a.e.t.)	Edgeworth Eagles	
2003	Broadmeadow Magic	Edgeworth Eagles	2–1	Broadmeadow Magic	
2004	Weston Bears	Broadmeadow Magic	3–1	Weston Bears	
2005	Broadmeadow Magic	Broadmeadow Magic	2–1	South Cardiff	
2006	Edgeworth Eagles	Lake Macquarie City	4–1	Edgeworth Eagles	
2007	Lake Macquarie City	Hamilton Olympic	1–0	Edgeworth Eagles	
2008	Broadmeadow Magic	Broadmeadow Magic	0–0 (4–3(p))	Highfields Azzuri	
2009	Edgeworth Eagles	Hamilton Olympic	2–1	Valentine Phoenix	
2010	Weston Bears	Edgeworth Eagles	4–2	Weston Bears	Valentine Phoenix (NNSWF State Cup)
2011	Broadmeadow Magic	Broadmeadow Magic	4–4 (4–3(p))	South Cardiff	South Cardiff (NNSWF State Cup)
2012	Hamilton Olympic	Broadmeadow Magic	4–1	Hamilton Olympic	Broadmeadow Magic (NNSWF State Cup)
2013	Broadmeadow Magic	Broadmeadow Magic	4–1	Lambton Jaffas	Urunga Raiders (NNSWF State Cup)

=== National Premier Leagues NNSW – 2014 to present ===
Season	Premiers	Champions	Score	Runners up	NNSWF State Cup Winner
2014	Newcastle Jets Youth	Lambton Jaffas	2–0	Weston Bears	Broadmeadow Magic
2015	Edgeworth Eagles	Edgeworth Eagles	2–0	Hamilton Olympic	Not held
2016	Edgeworth Eagles	Edgeworth Eagles	2–1	Broadmeadow Magic	Not held
2017	Edgeworth Eagles	Lambton Jaffas	2–0 (a.e.t.)	Edgeworth Eagles	Not held
2018	Edgeworth Eagles	Broadmeadow Magic	3–0	Edgeworth Eagles	Not held
2019	Maitland	Edgeworth Eagles	2–0	Maitland	Not held
2020	Edgeworth Eagles	Edgeworth Eagles	1–0	Maitland	Not held
2021	Lambton Jaffas	Not Played			Not held
2022	Maitland	Lambton Jaffas	1–0	Maitland	Not held
2023	Lambton Jaffas	Lambton Jaffas	2–1	Broadmeadow Magic	Broadmeadow Magic
2024	Broadmeadow Magic	Broadmeadow Magic	2–2 (4–3(p))	Edgeworth Eagles	Lambton Jaffas
2025	Broadmeadow Magic	Broadmeadow Magic	2–0	Lambton Jaffas	Cooks Hill United
2026	Broadmeadow Magic	Weston Bears	2–0	Maitland	Maitland
