= 2011–12 Central Coast Mariners FC season =

Central Coast Mariners
2011–12 season
- Chairman: Peter Turnbull
- Manager: Graham Arnold
- A-League premiership (regular season): 1st
- A-League championship (finals): 3rd
- Asian Champions League: Group stage (3rd)
- Top goalscorer: League: Matt Simon, Bernie Ibini-Isei (7); All: Patrick Zwaanswijk (8)
- Highest home attendance: 14 838 vs Gold Coast United
- Lowest home attendance: 6 883 vs Perth Glory
- Average home league attendance: 9 628
Home colours	Away colours

The 2011–12 Central Coast Mariners season will be Central Coast Mariners's seventh A-League season. It includes the 2011–12 A-League season as well as any other competitions of the 2011–12 football (soccer) season. This will include competing in the 2012 AFC Champions League.

== Pre-season and friendlies ==
The 2011 off-season is longer than usual (March–October) as Football Federation Australia shifted the next season's start back to avoid clashing with the NRL and AFL finals.

In May, it was announced that the Mariners would play Celtic on their tour of Australia in July, a game which the Mariners won 1–0 through a late Troy Hearfield long range effort.

The Mariners also agreed to a deal with a new kit supplier, Hummel International.

Much of the news at the club in pre-season related to the future of young talent Mustafa Amini, who had attracted interest from many European clubs, including German champions Borussia Dortmund and Scottish side Celtic, amongst others. After an extended negotiation period, Amini was sold to Dortmund, and immediately loaned back to the Mariners until May 2012.

Pre-season fixtures included the annual tour of the Australian Capital Territory, and a tour of New Zealand. Whilst in Canberra, the Mariners retained the Bank of Queensland Cup, winning their annual clash with Belconnen United FC 5–0. Overall, the Mariners enjoyed a successful pre-season, including wins over A-League opposition Perth Glory and Wellington Phoenix. They also won the annual Doug Turnbull cup, against Bankstown City Lions. The Mariners were a game away from a second consecutive undefeated pre-season (after not losing a pre-season game in the 2010 pre-season), however, they were beaten 3–1 by Auckland City FC in Auckland in their final friendly before the season proper. Michael Baird was the top-scorer in pre-season, scoring 7 goals.

=== Pre-Season triallists ===
- (New Zealand) Adam McGeorge
- (Australia) Antony Golec
- (United States) Austen Ezzell
- (Australia) Brent Griffiths

=== Pre-Season fixtures/ friendlies ===
Games in New South Wales unless specified. Games in this section are in local time.

22 June 2011	Blacktown City Demons	0–3	Central Coast Mariners	Gabbie Stadium, Seven Hills
Wednesday, 6:45 pm		Report	Adriano Pellegrino 35'; Michael Baird 40'; Adam McGeorge 87'	Attendance: 200

28 June 2011	GHFA Spirit FC	0–2	Central Coast Mariners	Christie Park, Marsfield
Tuesday, 7:00 pm		Report	Adriano Pellegrino 25'; Michael Baird 40'	Attendance: 400

2 July 2011	Central Coast Mariners	1–0	(Scotland) Celtic FC	ANZ Stadium, Sydney
Saturday, 7:30 pm	Troy Hearfield 87'	Report		Attendance: 19 482; Referee: Matthew Breeze

7 July 2011	Central Coast Mariners	1–1	Young Socceroos	Bluetongue Stadium, Gosford
Thursday	Michael Baird 54' (pen)	Report	Dimitri Petratos 56'	Attendance: Training match Referee: Kris Griffiths-Jones

12 July 2011	Belconnen United FC	0–5	Central Coast Mariners	Belconnen Soccer Centre, McKellar, Australian Capital Territory
Tuesday, 7:00 pm		Report	Rostyn Griffiths 15'; Michael Baird 35', 79', 85'; Pedj Bojic 40'	Attendance: 950; Referee: Brett Woodford

14 July 2011	Canberra FC	1–2	Central Coast Mariners	Deakin Stadium, Deakin, Australian Capital Territory
Thursday, 7:00 pm	Paul Ivanic 12'	Report	Troy Hearfield 22'; Oliver Bozanic 57'	Referee: Luke Withell

7 September 2011	Bankstown City Lions	0–3	Central Coast Mariners	Jensen Park, Sefton
Wednesday, 7:30 pm		Report	Oliver Bozanic 5'; Michael Baird 9'; Michael McGlinchey 49'	Attendance: 300; Referee: Gerard Parsons

11 September 2011	Dandaloo Lions	0–1	Central Coast Mariners	John Crehan Park, Cringila
Sunday, 5:00 pm		Report	Matt Simon 33'	Referee: Matt Cropper

14 September 2011	Lake Macquarie Roosters	0–3	Central Coast Mariners	Macquarie Field, Speers Point
Wednesday, 7:00 pm		Report	Daniel McBreen 20', 75' (pen); Brent Griffiths 35'	Referee: Andrew Higgins

18 September 2011	Central Coast Mariners	1–0	Perth Glory	Knox Grammar School, Sydney
Sunday, 2:00 pm	Adriano Pellegrino 45'	Report		Referee: Regis Queffelec

25 September 2011	(New Zealand) Wellington Phoenix	0–2	Central Coast Mariners	Baypark Stadium, Tauranga, New Zealand
Sunday, 1:30 pm		Report	Patrick Zwaanswijk 40'; Bernie Ibini-Isei 79'	Attendance: 3 000

28 September 2011	(New Zealand) Auckland City FC	3–1	Central Coast Mariners	Croatian Cultural Society, Henderson, New Zealand
Wednesday, 7:15 pm	Manuel Exposito 36' (pen); Alex Feneridis 44'; Emiliano Tade 90'	Report	Oliver Bozanic 33'

14 December 2011	Central Coast Mariners	1–0	Malaysia U-23	Mingara Athletics Track, Tumbi Umbi
Wednesday	Daniel McBreen	Report		Attendance: Training match

11 April 2012	Marconi Stallions	1–2	Central Coast Mariners	Marconi Stadium, Bossley Park
Tuesday, 7:00 pm	Nathan Elasi 3'	Report	Troy Hearfield 65'; Mitchell Duke 78'	Attendance: Training match

== 2011–12 A-League ==
Fixtures for the 2011–12 A-League were announced in late May. Notable fixtures include a 2011 A-League Grand Final rematch in the opening fixture against Brisbane Roar, and the Mariners' traditional New Year's Eve match, this year against Gold Coast United.

=== October ===
The Mariners' season got off to a rough start, with no wins in their first three games, picking up only one point. This included a draw with Gold Coast United, thanks to a late Patrick Zwaanswijk equaliser, and a loss in The F3 Derby against Newcastle. However, they managed to kick start their season with a come from behind win over Perth Glory at Bluetongue Stadium, winning 2–1 with goals from Matt Simon and Bernie Ibini-Isei.

=== November ===
November was a successful period for the club, with the Mariners undefeated in their four games in the month. This included an eventful 3–2 win over Sydney FC in the New South Wales derby. Bernie Ibini-Isei was named the A-League's young player of the month for November.

=== December ===
The Mariners completed a second consecutive undefeated month in December, with four wins and one draw. This included wins in The F3 Derby as well as a win over rivals Brisbane Roar, and a 4–0 victory over Adelaide United in Adelaide- the side's biggest ever home loss. The annual New Year's Eve match was a nil all draw with Gold Coast United. Late in the month, it was announced that local long-serving striker Matt Simon would be leaving in early January to play for K-League side Chunnam Dragons. The Mariners ended 2011 on top of the A-League ladder. Mustafa Amini was named A-League young player of the month for December.

=== January ===
In January, the Mariners were again undefeated, extending their undefeated streak to a club record 15 games by the end of the month. Matt Simon left the club to go to South Korea, scoring a brace in his final game before moving overseas against Melbourne Victory. Trent Sainsbury, Joshua Rose and Bernie Ibini-Isei were re-signed, and Tom Rogic transferred to the team. Mitchell Duke, Jimmy Oates and Anthony Caceres were promoted from the youth team under the terms of their "senior" contracts for the 2012 AFC Champions League and future A-League seasons. The Mariners ended 10 January points clear at the top of the A-League table. On 31 January the Central Coast Mariners confirmed that they had secured the services of John Sutton for 4 months on a loan deal to cover the loss of Matt Simon. Mathew Ryan was named the A-League's young player of the month for January.

=== February ===
February saw the end of the Mariners' extended undefeated run, and two other losses in the month saw the lead at the top of the table reduced ahead of Brisbane Roar. Rostyn Griffiths was sold to Guangzhou R&F for what was rumoured to be a club record transfer fee, around the A$1 million mark. By the end of the month, the Central Coast Mariners youth team had all but won the 2011–12 A-League National Youth League title. Tom Rogic won the A-League young player of the month award for February- the fourth consecutive month in which the Mariners had won the award.

=== March ===
March was a mixed month for the club, with two wins, one draw and two losses in A-League matches. Wins in the last two games of the regular season earned the Mariners the 2011–12 A-League Premiership, ahead of Brisbane Roar. This earned the team a spot in the 2013 AFC Champions League. The Mariners campaign in the 2012 AFC Champions League began in March, with two draws.

=== April ===
On the field, April was a less successful month for the Mariners, with the team eliminated from the 2011–12 A-League finals by Perth Glory and suffering a loss to Seongnam Ilhwa in Seongnam after the two teams drew in Gosford in the 2012 AFC Champions League. Off the field, Mathew Ryan was awarded the A-League's young player and goalkeeper of the year awards, and Graham Arnold was awarded A-League coach of the year. Ryan, Patrick Zwaanswijk and Joshua Rose were named in the team of the season, with Arnold named as coach.

=== May ===
May saw the season finish with the end of the 2012 AFC Champions League group stage. A 5–1 win over Tianjin Teda FC- the club's first in the AFC Champions League- saw the Mariners travel to Japan needing to beat Nagoya Grampus to progress in the competition. However, a loss in this game saw the Mariners finish third in the group.

Pos	Team	Pld	W	D	L	GF	GA	GD	Pts	Qualification
1	Central Coast Mariners	27	15	6	6	40	24	+16	51	Qualification for 2013 AFC Champions League group stage and finals series (Note: First place qualifies for the 2013 AFC Champions League group stage. Winning the 2012 A-League Grand Final automatically earns qualification for the 2013 AFC Champions League qualifying play-off, unless first place are champions.)
2	Brisbane Roar (C)	27	14	7	6	50	28	+22	49	Qualification for 2013 AFC Champions League qualifying play-off and finals series
3	Perth Glory	27	13	4	10	40	35	+5	43	Qualification for Finals series
4	Wellington Phoenix	27	12	4	11	34	32	+2	40	Qualification for Finals series
5	Sydney FC	27	10	8	9	37	42	−5	38	Qualification for Finals series
6	Melbourne Heart	27	9	10	8	35	34	+1	37	Qualification for Finals series
7	Newcastle Jets	27	10	5	12	38	41	−3	35	
8	Melbourne Victory	27	6	11	10	35	43	−8	29	
9	Adelaide United	27	5	10	12	26	44	−18	25	
10	Gold Coast United	27	4	9	14	30	42	−12	21	

Source: ultimatealeague.com
Rules for classification: 1) points; 2) goal difference; 3) number of goals scored.
(C) Champions

== 2011–12 squad ==
Players who have been announced as contracted to the Central Coast Mariners senior squad for the 2011–12 season. Note: Flags indicate national team as defined under FIFA eligibility rules; some limited exceptions apply. Players may hold more than one non-FIFA nationality.

No.	Pos.	Nation	Player
1	GK	AUS	Mathew Ryan
2	FW	AUS	Daniel McBreen
3	DF	AUS	Joshua Rose
4	DF	AUS	Pedj Bojic
5	MF	AUS	Brad Porter
6	DF	NED	Patrick Zwaanswijk
7	MF	MLT	John Hutchinson
8	MF	AUS	Rostyn Griffiths
9	FW	AUS	Bernie Ibini-Isei
10	MF	AUS	Adriano Pellegrino
11	MF	AUS	Oliver Bozanic
12	MF	AUS	Troy Hearfield
13	MF	AUS	Stuart Musialik
14	MF	NZL	Michael McGlinchey
15	MF	PNG	Brad McDonald
16	DF	AUS	Trent Sainsbury

No.	Pos.	Nation	Player
17	FW	AUS	Michael Baird
17	MF	AUS	Tom Rogic
18	DF	AUS	Alex Wilkinson
19	FW	AUS	Matt Simon
19	FW	ENG	John Sutton
20	GK	AUS	Justin Pasfield
21	DF	AUS	Sam Gallagher
22	MF	AUS	Mustafa Amini
23	FW	AUS	Adam Kwasnik
24	MF	AUS	Anthony Caceres
25	FW	AUS	Mitchell Duke
27	DF	AUS	Trent McClenahan
30	GK	AUS	Nathan Denham
31	GK	AUS	Brody Crane
??	DF	AUS	James Oates

=== Transfers ===
In

Name	Position	Moving from	Notes
(Australia) Justin Pasfield	Goalkeeper	(Australia) North Queensland Fury	2-year senior contract
(Australia) Troy Hearfield	Midfielder	(New Zealand) Wellington Phoenix	
(Papua New Guinea) Brad McDonald	Midfielder	(Australia) North Queensland Fury	1-year senior contract
(Australia) Adriano Pellegrino	Midfielder	(Australia) Perth Glory	2-year senior contract
(Australia) Stuart Musialik	Midfielder	(Australia) Sydney FC	1-year senior contract
(Australia) Tom Rogic	Midfielder	Free agent	5-month senior contract
(Australia) Trent McClenahan	Defender	Free agent	3-month contract (2012 AFC Champions League)

Out

Name	Position	Moving to	Notes
(Australia) Nik Mrdja	Striker	Retired	
(Argentina) Patricio Perez	Midfielder	(Argentina) Club Atlético All Boys	Due to personal reasons.
(Australia) Marc Warren	Defender	(England) Sheffield United	Left during 2011 January transfer window.
(Scotland) Chris Doig	Defender	(Indonesia) Pelita Jaya	
(Australia) Paul Henderson	Goalkeeper	(Australia) Sydney Olympic FC	-End of long-term injury replacement contract.
(Australia) Jess Vanstrattan	Goalkeeper	Released	
(Australia) Mustafa Amini	Midfielder	(Germany) Borussia Dortmund	-Loaned back to Mariners for 2011–12 season. -Reported transfer fee: $400,000
(Australia) Matthew Lewis	Midfielder	(Australia) Blacktown City FC	-Contract not renewed.
(Australia) Michael Baird	Striker	(Malaysia) Sabah FA	-Left mid-season.
(Australia) Matt Simon	Striker	(South Korea) Chunnam Dragons	-Left during 2012 January transfer window -Reported transfer fee: $170,000
(Australia) Rostyn Griffiths	Midfielder	(China) Guangzhou R&F	-Reported transfer fee: $1,500,000

=== Loan deals ===
In

Player	Position	Club	Duration
(Australia) Mustafa Amini	Midfielder	(Germany) Borussia Dortmund	July 2011– May 2012
(Australia) Nathan Denham	Goalkeeper	(Australia) Sutherland Sharks	November 2011
(England) John Sutton	Striker	(Scotland) Heart of Midlothian	February 2012– May 2012
(Australia) Brody Crane	Goalkeeper	(Australia) South Coast Wolves	February 2012

Out

Player	Position	Club	Duration
(Australia) Troy Hearfield	Midfielder	(Indonesia) Pelita Jaya	March 2011– June 2011
(Australia) Alex Wilkinson	Defender	(China) Jiangsu Sainty	March 2011– July 2011
(Australia) Adam Kwasnik	Striker	(China) Chengdu Blades	March 2011– August 2011
(Malta) John Hutchinson	Midfielder	(China) Chengdu Blades	July 2011– October 2011

=== Injuries ===
Name	Position	Injury	Duration
(Australia) Mathew Ryan	Goalkeeper	Knee	May 2011– September 2011
(Australia) Mustafa Amini	Midfielder	Osteitis pubis	August 2011– October 2011
(Australia) Alex Wilkinson	Defender	Arm	September 2011– October 2011
(Australia) Stuart Musialik	Midfielder	Hip	September 2011– December 2011
(Australia) Rostyn Griffiths	Midfielder	Hip	December 2011– January 2012

== 2011–12 A-League fixtures/results ==
All times AEST/AEDST, and PM

=== Regular season ===
8 October 2011 1	Brisbane Roar	1–0	Central Coast Mariners	Suncorp Stadium, Brisbane
Saturday 8:45	Mitch Nichols 72'	Report		Attendance: 13 467; Referee: Chris Beath

15 October 2011 2	Central Coast Mariners	1–1	Gold Coast United	Bluetongue Stadium, Gosford
Saturday 5:30	Patrick Zwaanswijk 87'	Report	James Brown 47'	Attendance: 10 374; Referee: Peter O'Leary

23 October 2011 3	Newcastle Jets	1–0	Central Coast Mariners	Ausgrid Stadium, Newcastle
Sunday 5:00	Jeremy Brockie 25'	Report		Attendance: 14 421; Referee: Jarred Gillett

29 October 2011 4	Central Coast Mariners	2–1	Perth Glory	Bluetongue Stadium, Gosford
Saturday 5:30	Matt Simon 27'; Bernie Ibini-Isei 45'	Report	Travis Dodd 6'	Attendance: 6 883; Referee: Ryan Shepheard

4 November 2011 5	Wellington Phoenix	1–2	Central Coast Mariners	Westpac Stadium, Wellington
Friday 5:30	Chris Greenacre 68'	Report	Bernie Ibini-Isei 47'; Matt Simon 81'	Attendance: 5 090; Referee: Gerard Parsons

12 November 2011 6	Central Coast Mariners	0–0	Melbourne Victory	Bluetongue Stadium, Gosford
Saturday 7:45		Report		Attendance: 10 521; Referee: Strebre Delovski

19 November 2011 7	Sydney FC	2–3	Central Coast Mariners	Sydney Football Stadium, Sydney
Saturday 7:45	Nick Carle 77'; Brett Emerton 88'	Report	Patrick Zwaanswijk 41'; Michael McGlinchey 66'; Troy Hearfield 82'	Attendance: 13 947; Referee: Strebre Delovski

26 November 2011 8	Central Coast Mariners	3–1	Melbourne Heart	Bluetongue Stadium, Gosford
Saturday 5:30	Matt Simon 45+1'; Daniel McBreen 83' (pen); Patrick Zwaanswijk 87'	Report	Eli Babalj 78'	Attendance: 7 242; Referee: Gerard Parsons

2 December 2011 9	Adelaide United	0–4	Central Coast Mariners	Hindmarsh Stadium, Adelaide
Friday 8:00		Report	Mustafa Amini 29'; Bernie Ibini-Isei 32'; Patrick Zwaanswijk 39' (pen); Rostyn Griffiths 65'	Attendance: 8 437; Referee: Kris Griffiths-Jones

10 December 2011 10	Central Coast Mariners	2–0	Newcastle Jets	Bluetongue Stadium, Gosford
Saturday 5:30	Rostyn Griffiths 25'; Matt Simon 59'	Report		Attendance: 10 643; Referee: Strebre Delovski

17 December 2011 11	Brisbane Roar	1–2	Central Coast Mariners	Suncorp Stadium, Brisbane
Saturday 7:45	Kofi Danning 83'	Report	Mustafa Amini 6'; Pedj Bojic 45'	Attendance: 10 006; Referee: Peter Green

23 December 2011 12	Perth Glory	1–3	Central Coast Mariners	nib Stadium, Perth
Friday 10:00	Josh Mitchell (red card) 26'; Steven McGarry 84'	Report	Bernie Ibini-Isei 49'; Pedj Bojic 60'; Matt Simon 64'	Attendance: 6 620; Referee: Matt Gillett

31 December 2011 13	Central Coast Mariners	0–0	Gold Coast United	Bluetongue Stadium, Gosford
Saturday 6:15		Report		Attendance: 14 838; Referee: Ryan Shepheard

4 January 2012 14	Central Coast Mariners	2–0	Melbourne Victory	Bluetongue Stadium, Gosford
Wednesday 7:45	Matt Simon 1', 84'	Report		Attendance: 12 284; Referee: Peter Green

7 January 2012 15	Sydney FC	0–1	Central Coast Mariners	Sydney Football Stadium, Sydney
Sunday 4:00		Report	Oliver Bozanic 9'	Attendance: 11 866; Referee: Jarred Gillett

14 January 2012 16	Central Coast Mariners	1–1	Newcastle Jets	Bluetongue Stadium, Gosford
Saturday 5:30	Patrick Zwaanswijk 59'	Report	Labinot Haliti 17'	Attendance: 10 904; Referee: Matt Gillett

18 January 2012 17	Melbourne Heart	0–1	Central Coast Mariners	AAMI Park, Melbourne
Wednesday 7:30		Report	Adam Kwasnik 89'	Attendance: 5 522; Referee: Strebre Delovski

21 January 2012 18	Central Coast Mariners	3–2	Adelaide United	Bluetongue Stadium, Gosford
Saturday 5:30	Daniel McBreen 15'; Adam Kwasnik 75'; Joshua Rose 78'	Report	Sergio van Dijk 16'; Bruce Djite 19'	Attendance: 7 478; Referee: Kris Griffiths-Jones

4 February 2012 19	Central Coast Mariners	0–2	Brisbane Roar	Bluetongue Stadium, Gosford
Saturday 5:30		Report	Paartalu 5'; Berisha 39'	Attendance: 10 217; Referee: Kris Griffiths-Jones

10 February 2012 20	Melbourne Victory	2–1	Central Coast Mariners	AAMI Park, Melbourne
Friday 8:00	Carlos Hernandez 15'; Harry Kewell 50'	Report	Tom Rogic 8'; Trent Sainsbury (red card) 62'	Attendance: 14 060; Referee: Peter Green

18 February 2012 21	Central Coast Mariners	2–0	Wellington Phoenix	Bluetongue Stadium, Gosford
Saturday 5:30	Tom Rogic 52'; Patrick Zwaanswijk 83'	Report		Attendance: 7 845; Referee: Strebre Delovski

22 February 2012* 22	Gold Coast United	3–3	Central Coast Mariners	Skilled Park, Robina
Wednesday 8:00	Chris Harold 10' (pen.); Ben Halloran 18'; Mitch Cooper 56'	Report	Adam Kwasnik 4', 66'; Bernie Ibini-Isei 60'	Attendance: 1 141; Referee: Matthew Gillett

26 February 2012 23	Melbourne Heart	1–0	Central Coast Mariners	AAMI Park, Melbourne
Sunday 5:00	Eli Babalj 50'	Report		Attendance: 5 034; Referee: Jarred Gillett

3 March 2012 24	Central Coast Mariners	1–1	Sydney FC	Bluetongue Stadium, Gosford
Saturday 7:45	Troy Hearfield 91'	Report	Joel Chianese 56'	Attendance: 8 658; Referee: Chris Beath

11 March 2012 25	Perth Glory	1–0	Central Coast Mariners	nib Stadium, Perth
Sunday 7:30	Travis Dodd 24'	Report		Attendance: 6 502; Referee: Chris Beath

17 March 2012 26	Central Coast Mariners	1–0	Adelaide United	Bluetongue Stadium, Gosford
Saturday 5:30	Bernie Ibini-Isei 47'	Report		Attendance: 7 275; Referee: Ben Williams

25 March 2012 27	Wellington Phoenix	1–2	Central Coast Mariners	Westpac Stadium, Wellington
Sunday 2:00	Leo Bertos 80'	Report	John Sutton 45'; Bernie Ibini-Isei 51'	Attendance: 9 740; Referee: Strebre Delovski

- *Match rescheduled from 27 January 2012 due to flooding risk in and around Skilled Park.

=== Finals ===
31 March 2012 Major semi-final leg 1	Brisbane Roar	2–0	Central Coast Mariners	Suncorp Stadium, Brisbane
Saturday 5:30	Henrique 8'; Erik Paartalu 86'	Report		Attendance: 15 081; Referee: Strebre Delovski

8 April 2012 Major semi-final leg 2	Central Coast Mariners	2–3	Brisbane Roar	Bluetongue Stadium, Gosford
Sunday 5:00	Patrick Zwaanswijk 29'; Adam Kwasnik 32'	Report	Thomas Broich 2'; Mitch Nichols 25'; Henrique 65'	Attendance: 9 846; Referee: Jarred Gillett

14 April 2012 Preliminary final	Central Coast Mariners	1–1 (a.e.t.) (3–5 p)	Perth Glory	Bluetongue Stadium, Gosford
Sunday 5:00	Adam Kwasnik 32'	Report	Shane Smeltz 34'	Attendance: 7572; Referee: Strebre Delovski
	Penalties
	Daniel McBreen (penalty scored); Alex Wilkinson (penalty scored); Mathew Ryan (penalty scored); Michael McGlinchey (penalty missed)		(penalty scored) Shane Smeltz; (penalty scored) Billy Mehmet; (penalty scored) Liam Miller; (penalty scored) Dean Heffernan; (penalty scored) Jacob Burns

== 2012 AFC Champions League ==
The Mariners qualified for the 2012 AFC Champions League as runners up in the 2010–11 A-League. In December 2011, they were drawn in group G, along with Nagoya Grampus of Japan, Tianjin Teda FC of China and Seongnam Ilhwa Chunma of South Korea.

Pos	Team	Pld	W	D	L	GF	GA	GD	Pts	Qualification	SIC	NGY	CCM	TTD
1	(South Korea) Seongnam Ilhwa Chunma	6	2	4	0	13	5	+8	10 (Note: Seongnam Ilhwa Chunma and Nagoya Grampus are tied on their head-to-head record (2 pts, 0 GD, 3 GF), and so are ranked by their overall goal difference.)	Advance to knockout stage	—	1–1	5–0	1–1
2	(Japan) Nagoya Grampus	6	2	4	0	10	4	+6	10	Advance to knockout stage	2–2	—	3–0	0–0
3	(Australia) Central Coast Mariners	6	1	3	2	7	11	−4	6		1–1	1–1	—	5–1
4	(China) Tianjin Teda	6	0	3	3	2	12	−10	3		0–3	0–3	0–0	—

Source: WorldFootball.net
Notes:

7 March 2012 1	Tianjin Teda FC	0–0	Central Coast Mariners	TEDA Football Stadium, Tianjin
Wednesday 11:00		Report		Attendance: 19 800; Referee: Abdullah Al Hilali

21 March 2012 2	Central Coast Mariners	1–1	Nagoya Grampus	Bluetongue Stadium, Gosford
Wednesday 7:30	Patrick Zwaanswijk 28'	Report	Tulio Tanaka 21'	Attendance: 5 130; Referee: Liu Kwok Man

3 April 2012 3	Central Coast Mariners	1–1	Seongnam Ilhwa	Bluetongue Stadium, Gosford
Tuesday 7:00	Adam Kwasnik 50'; Joshua Rose (red card) 61'	Report	Everton Santos 57'	Attendance: 5 018; Referee: Valentin Kovalenko

18 April 2012 4	Seongnam Ilhwa	5–0	Central Coast Mariners	Tancheon Sports Complex, Seongnam
Wednesday 8:30	Lee Chang-Hoon 39'; Everton Santos 43', 73' (pen); Sung Hwan Kim 69'; Vladimir Jovancic 83'	Report		Attendance: 2 017; Referee: Saeid Mozaffarizadeh

1 May 2012 5	Central Coast Mariners	5–1	Tianjin Teda FC	Bluetongue Stadium, Gosford
Tuesday 7:30	Daniel McBreen 10', 20'; Joshua Rose 49'; Michael McGlinchey 71'; Mustafa Amini 85'	Report	Liao Bochao 72'	Attendance: 4 155; Referee: Mohamed Abdelkarim Al-Zarooni

15 May 2012 6	Nagoya Grampus	3–0	Central Coast Mariners	Mizuho Athletic Stadium, Nagoya
Tuesday 8:00	Keiji Tamada 19'; Jungo Fujimoto 35'; Tulio Tanaka 87'	Report		Attendance: 5 037; Referee: Abdulrahman Abdou

== Squad stats ==
No.	Pos.	Name	A-League		Finals		AFC Champions League		Total		Discipline	
No.	Pos.	Name	Apps	Goals	Apps	Goals	Apps	Goals	Apps	Goals	Yellow card	Red card
1	GK	(Australia) Mathew Ryan	21	0	3	0	6	0	30	0	1	0
2	FW	(Australia) Daniel McBreen	23	2	2	0	5	2	30	4	3	0
3	DF	(Australia) Joshua Rose	27	1	3	0	5	1	35	2	6	1
4	DF	(Australia) Pedj Bojic	24	2	3	0	4	0	31	2	11	0
5	MF	(Australia) Bradley Porter	5	0	0	0	0	0	5	0	1	0
6	DF	(Netherlands) Patrick Zwaanswijk	26	6	3	1	6	1	35	8	9	0
7	MF	(Malta) John Hutchinson	19	0	3	0	6	0	28	0	9	0
8	MF	(Australia) Rostyn Griffiths	18	2	0	0	0	0	18	2	5	0
9	FW	(Australia) Bernie Ibini-Isei	26	7	3	0	6	0	35	7	0	0
10	MF	(Australia) Adriano Pellegrino	7	0	0	0	1	0	8	0	2	0
11	MF	(Australia) Oliver Bozanic	20	1	3	0	5	0	28	1	1	0
12	MF	(Australia) Troy Hearfield	26	2	2	0	4	0	32	2	0	0
13	MF	(Australia) Stuart Musialik	0	0	0	0	0	0	0	0	0	0
14	MF	(New Zealand) Michael McGlinchey	27	1	3	0	6	1	36	2	2	0
15	MF	(Papua New Guinea) Brad McDonald	0	0	0	0	0	0	0	0	0	0
16	DF	(Australia) Trent Sainsbury	8	0	1	0	2	0	11	0	3	1
17	FW	(Australia) Michael Baird	2	0	0	0	0	0	2	0	1	0
17	MF	(Australia) Tom Rogic	9	2	3	0	4	0	16	2	2	0
18	DF	(Australia) Alex Wilkinson	24	0	3	0	6	0	33	0	3	0
19	FW	(Australia) Matthew Simon	14	7	0	0	0	0	14	7	2	0
19	FW	(England) John Sutton	6	1	2	0	2	0	10	1	1	0
20	GK	(Australia) Justin Pasfield	6	0	0	0	0	0	6	0	0	0
21	DF	(Australia) Sam Gallagher	1	0	0	0	2	0	3	0	0	0
22	MF	(Australia) Mustafa Amini	16	2	2	0	4	1	22	3	1	0
23	FW	(Australia) Adam Kwasnik	16	4	3	2	5	1	24	7	5	0
24	MF	(Australia) Anthony Caceres	0	0	0	0	0	0	0	0	0	0
25	FW	(Australia) Mitchell Duke	0	0	0	0	1	0	1	0	0	0
27	DF	(Australia) Trent McClenahan	0	0	0	0	3	0	3	0	1	0
30	GK	(Australia) Nathan Denham	0	0	0	0	0	0	0	0	0	0
31	GK	(Australia) Brody Crane	0	0	0	0	0	0	0	0	0	0
??	DF	(Australia) James Oates	0	0	0	0	0	0	0	0	0	0

=== Top scorers ===
Total	Player		Goals per Round																										
Total	Player		1	2	3	4	5	6	7	8	9	10	11	12	13	14	15	16	17	18	19	20	21	22	23	24	25	26	27
7	(Australia)	Matt Simon				1	1			1		1		1		2													
7	(Australia)	Bernie Ibini-Isei				1	1				1			1										1				1	1
6	(Netherlands)	Patrick Zwaanswijk		1					1	1	1							1					1						
4	(Australia)	Adam Kwasnik																	1	1				2					
2	(Australia)	Rostyn Griffiths									1	1																	
2	(Australia)	Mustafa Amini									1		1																
2	(Australia)	Pedj Bojic											1	1															
2	(Australia)	Daniel McBreen								1										1									
2	(Australia)	Tom Rogic																				1	1						
2	(Australia)	Troy Hearfield							1																	1			
1	(New Zealand)	Michael McGlinchey							1																				
1	(Australia)	Oliver Bozanic															1												
1	(Australia)	Joshua Rose																		1									
1	(England)	John Sutton																											1

A goal was scored from a penalty kick
Two goals were scored from penalty kicks
