= Daniel McBreen =

English footballer (born 1977)

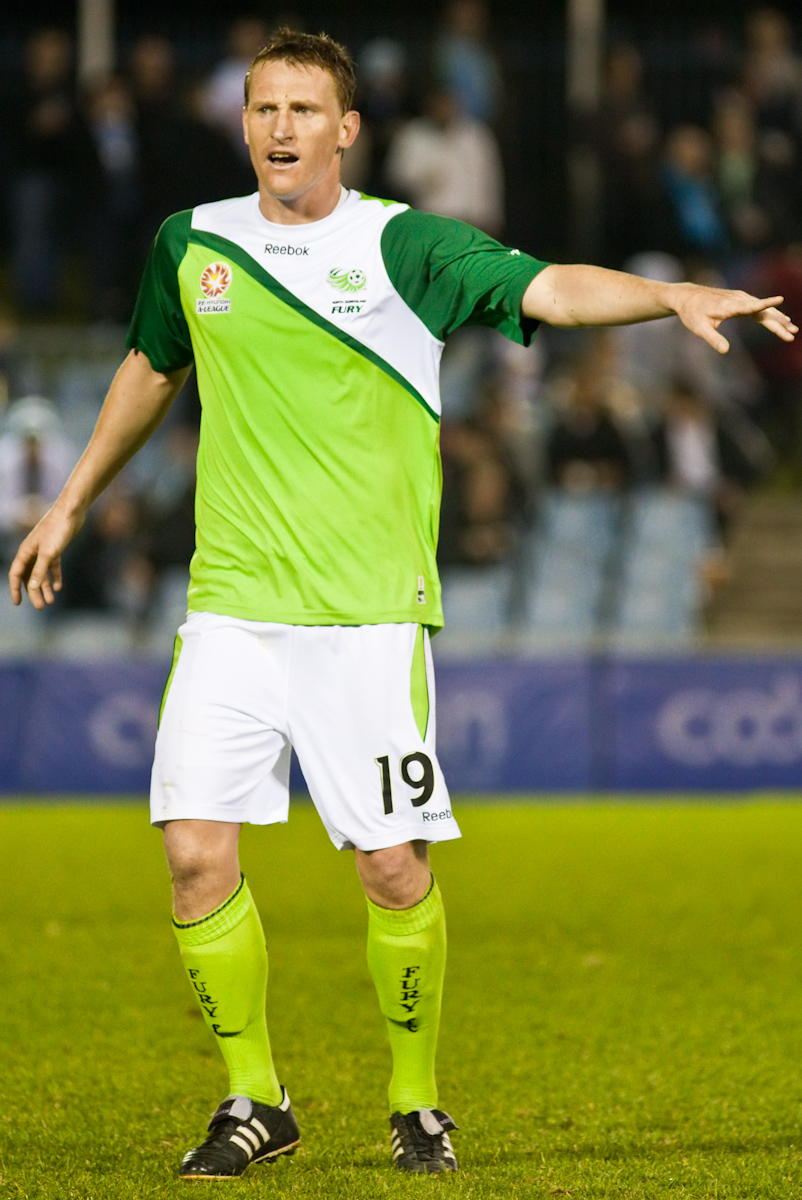
- McBreen playing for North Queensland Fury in 2009

Personal information
- Full name: Daniel James McBreen
- Date of birth: 23 April 1977 (age 49)
- Place of birth: Burnley, England
- Height: 6 ft 1 in (1.86 m)
- Position: Striker

Team information
- Current team: Newcastle Jets Youth (head coach)

Senior career*
Years	Team	Apps	(Gls)
–1999	Toronto Awaba Stags		
1999–2000	Edgeworth Eagles		
2000–2002	Newcastle United	36	(9)
2002–2004	Universitatea Craiova	33	(3)
2004–2006	Falkirk	55	(19)
2006–2008	Scunthorpe United	7	(0)
2007	→ York City (loan)	5	(2)
2008	St Johnstone	6	(0)
2008–2009	York City	38	(5)
2009–2010	North Queensland Fury	21	(3)
2010	Perth Glory	7	(5)
2010–2014	Central Coast Mariners	95	(28)
2013	→ Shanghai Dongya (loan)	13	(3)
2014	Shanghai Dongya	28	(5)
2015	South China	4	(0)
2016–2019	Edgeworth FC	66	(22)
Total		414	(104)

Managerial career
- 2019–2022: Newcastle Jets Youth
- * Club domestic league appearances and goals

Daniel James McBreen (born 23 April 1977) is a former professional footballer who played as a striker. He played in the Romanian Divizia A for Universitatea Craiova, in the Scottish Premier League for Falkirk, in the Football League for Scunthorpe United, in the A-League for North Queensland Fury, Perth Glory and Central Coast Mariners, in the Chinese Super League for Shanghai Dongya and in the Hong Kong Premier League for South China. He is the formerly head coach of the Newcastle Jets youth team.

Born in England, McBreen moved to Australia with his family when he was six weeks old and started his career in local football with Toronto Awaba Stags and Edgeworth Eagles. He earned a professional contract with National Soccer League club Newcastle United in 2000, where he played for two seasons before joining Universitatea Craiova of the Romanian Divizia A. He left them amid a dispute over wages in 2004, when he joined Falkirk, where he won the Scottish First Division title and the Scottish Challenge Cup in the 2004–05 season. McBreen spent 2005–06 with them in the Scottish Premier League before being released, when he joined League One club Scunthorpe United in 2006. He played sporadically in their 2006–07 League One title-winning season, and was loaned to Conference Premier club York City in 2007 before having a short spell with St Johnstone in the Scottish First Division. McBreen rejoined York permanently in 2008 and played one season for them, with his last match in Europe coming in their defeat in the 2009 FA Trophy Final at Wembley Stadium.

He returned to Australia to play in the A-League for North Queensland Fury, but mid-season agreed to join division rivals Central Coast Mariners for the next two seasons. McBreen completed 2009–10 with another A-League club, Perth Glory, and his good form with them resulted in a call-up to the Australia national team. He was part of the Mariners team that finished in second place in the 2010–11 A-League but was beaten in the 2011 A-League Grand Final. The Mariners were the Australian Premiers in 2011–12, but were knocked out of the finals series in the preliminary final. McBreen scored one of the Mariners' goals in the 2013 A-League Grand Final as they were crowned A-League Champions, and for his performance he was awarded the Joe Marston Medal. He had already won A-League Golden Boot as the division's top scorer with 17 goals. He then went on loan with Shanghai Dongya, before joining them permanently for the 2014 Chinese Super League and having a spell with South China for the remainder of the 2014–15 Hong Kong Premier League.

== Club career ==
=== Early life and career ===
McBreen was born in Burnley, Lancashire, England to Jim and Kathy (née Wood). The family moved to Australia six weeks later after his father took up an offer to play football for Edgeworth Eagles. He was raised in Newcastle, New South Wales and started his career playing local football for Toronto Awaba Stags before joining Edgeworth Eagles in 1999. McBreen scored over 20 goals for them in the 1999 Northern NSW State Football League before being the league's top scorer the following season with 23 goals. However, he was dropped for the grand final, when Edgeworth were beaten 3–0 by Hamilton Olympic.

McBreen earned his first professional contract aged 23 with Newcastle United of the National Soccer League in July 2000. He later credited Edgeworth coach Bobby Naumov for the move, saying "He set me on the road to a pro career". McBreen made his debut that year, and scored 6 goals from 23 appearances as Newcastle finished in 14th place in the 2000–01 National Soccer League table. Newcastle turned full-time the following year, and McBreen played 13 matches and scored 3 goals with Newcastle improving their league position by ranking second in the 2001–02 National Soccer League table. Despite playing less frequently he enjoyed working under new coach Ian Crook, saying "you can speak to him as a human being and he can man manage. He made training enjoyable".

=== Spells in Europe ===
After being offered a trial with Universitatea Craiova by an agent, McBreen signed for the Romanian Divizia A club in July 2002 on a three-year contract. He made his debut in 3–1 win over Astra Ploiești on 17 August, and scored only once in 13 appearances for a Craiova team that ranked seventh in the 2002–03 Divizia A table. However, McBreen's wages were continually paid late throughout the season and he came close to a move to Norwegian Tippeligaen club Lillestrøm, only for Craiova to twice raise their asking price for him on transfer deadline day. He played more regularly the next season, making 20 appearances and scoring 2 goals as Craiova finished fourth in the 2003–04 Divizia A table. He finally left Craiova in 2004 after the club's president Pavel Badea, a former teammate of McBreen's at the club, signed a letter releasing him from his contract. He took his case to FIFA and the Court of Arbitration for Sport with the help of Professional Footballers Australia, and only received the money he was owed after the club was given a three-point deduction and was threatened with automatic relegation.

McBreen was prepared to return to Australia before being offered a trial with Falkirk of the Scottish First Division. He also played for Conference South club St Albans City in pre-season before Falkirk received international clearance to play him in September 2004. McBreen made his debut as a 73rd-minute substitute for Andy Thomson in a 3–0 home win over Gretna in the Scottish Challenge Cup on 14 September. He came on as a 72nd-minute substitute for Thomson in the 2004 Scottish Challenge Cup Final, in which Falkirk beat Ross County 2–1 at McDiarmid Park on 7 November. His first goal came on his first start for the club, with a shot from eight yards seconds before half-time, as Falkirk beat Raith Rovers 2–0 away on 13 November. This marked the start of a run of nine goals from seven matches, and come the end of the season McBreen and his strike partner Darryl Duffy had scored a combined total of 40 goals. He finished 2004–05 with 13 goals from 26 matches as Falkirk were promoted to the Scottish Premier League as 2004–05 Scottish First Division champions. His 13 league goals saw him ranked as the division's fourth highest scorer.

McBreen signed a new one-year contract with Falkirk in June 2005, and manager John Hughes predicted "With a good pre-season under his belt, I'm sure he'll get even better". He scored his first goal of the 2005–06 season in the 83rd minute of a home match against Rangers on 10 September, with a header from Alan Gow's cross that secured Falkirk a 1–1 draw. McBreen scored the only goal in Falkirk's 1–0 win over Livingston on 6 May 2006 with a header from Gow's free kick, which was only the team's second victory at home all season. He appeared more frequently in 2005–06, making 38 appearances but only scoring 8 goals, with Falkirk ranking in 10th place in the 2005–06 Scottish Premier League table. Despite taking over the main striking role after Duffy's transfer to Hull City in January, McBreen was released by the club in May.

He went on trial with League One clubs Northampton Town, Brighton & Hove Albion and Scunthorpe United, signing for the latter on 30 August 2006 on a two-year contract. He made his debut two days later starting a 2–0 away victory over Gillingham, but due to a hamstring injury that kept him out of action for 10 months his last appearance of 2006–07 came in November. He made 10 appearances for a Scunthorpe team that won promotion to the Championship as 2006–07 League One champions. At the end of the season, McBreen was told by Scunthorpe manager Nigel Adkins that he was free to pursue a transfer to another club, despite having a year remaining on his contract.

McBreen joined Conference Premier club York City on 5 October 2007 on a one-month loan, with the option of a possible extension. His York debut came in a 4–1 home defeat to Histon a day later and scored his first goal in the following match against Stafford Rangers, with a header from a Martyn Woolford cross in a 2–0 home victory. After making five appearances and scoring two goals he was recalled by Scunthorpe on 5 November due to the departure of on-loan Millwall striker Ben May. Despite this, York manager Billy McEwan was interested in bringing McBreen back to the club for another loan spell. He bought out the remainder of his Scunthorpe contract to join St Johnstone of the Scottish First Division on 2 January 2008 on a contract until the end of the season. His debut came the same day in a 1–1 home draw with Dundee, which he entered as a 62nd-minute substitute for Liam Craig. He suffered a knee injury during this match, and this hampered his progress at the club. On 20 April, McBreen scored the opening goal with a back-post header from Paul Sheerin's cross in St Johnstone's Scottish Cup semi-final against Rangers at Hampden Park in extra time, which they eventually lost in a penalty shoot-out. St Johnstone finished in third place in the 2007–08 Scottish First Division table as McBreen made seven appearances and scored one goal before being released by the club in May.

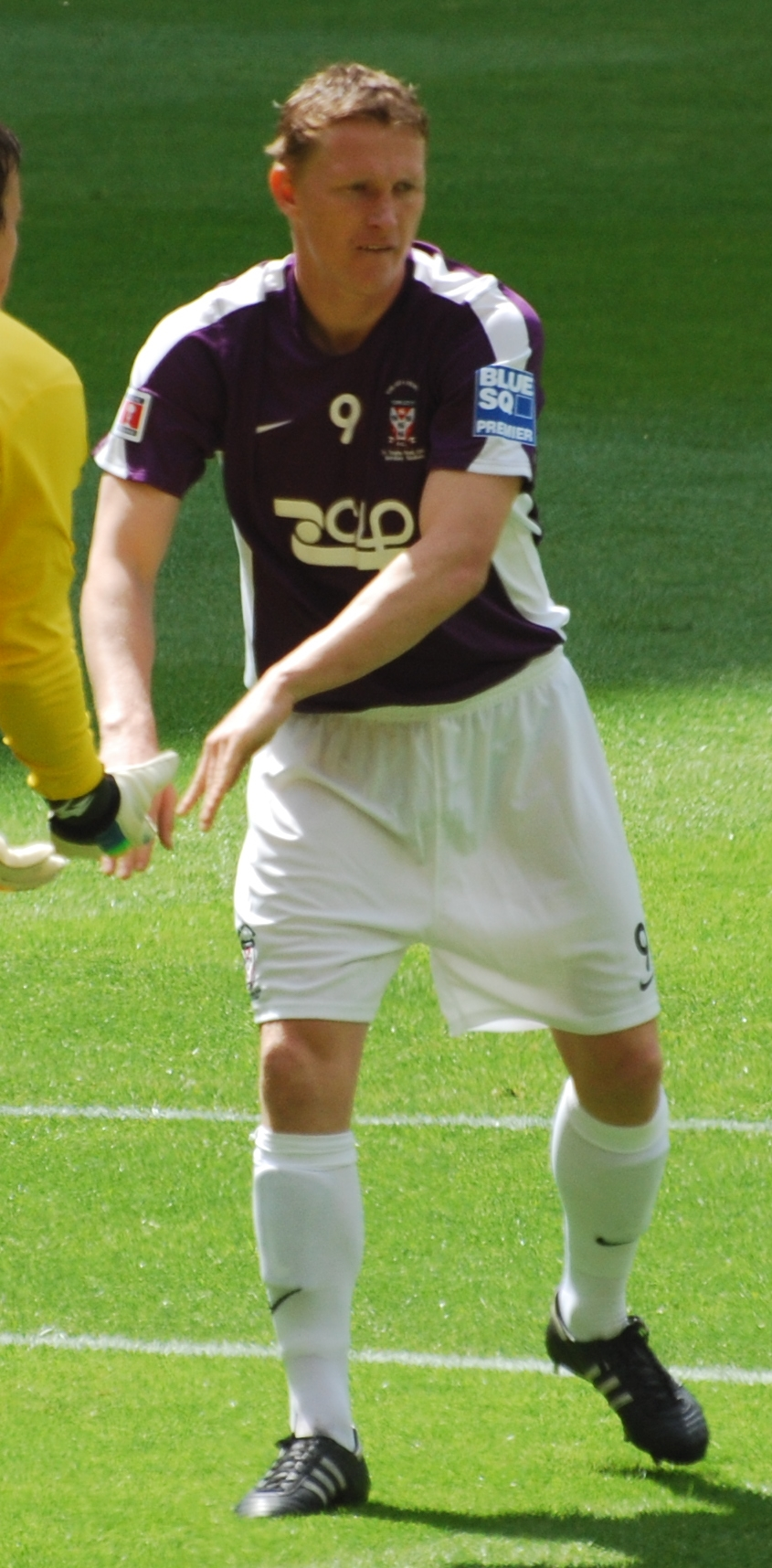
McBreen playing for York City in the 2009 FA Trophy Final

McBreen held talks with A-League team Adelaide United before being handed a trial with their divisional rivals Wellington Phoenix. He returned to former club York City on 25 June 2008 on a one-year contract. His first match back at the club was a 1–0 away victory over Crawley Town and in his third appearance he scored his first goal of the 2008–09 season with a left-footed shot from 17 yards in a 1–1 home draw with Histon. McBreen was played primarily as a lone striker in away matches during 2008–09, a decision which York manager Colin Walker defended in September; Dave Flett of The Press commented that he "[led] the line lazily". During February 2009, it was reported in the Australian media that he had agreed join A-League newcomers North Queensland Fury, although York were unaware of any transfer taking place. It was later confirmed that he would join the Fury in August for the 2009–10 A-League, following the expiry of his York contract in June. He had scored in every round of the 2008–09 FA Trophy leading up to the final, bar the first round when he was an unused substitute, and ahead of the final commented that: "I couldn't ask for anything more than a Wembley final to end my career in Europe and it's also a great finale to a disappointing season for the fans and players". He started in the match at Wembley Stadium on 9 May, which York lost 2–0 to Stevenage Borough. He made 48 appearances and scored 10 goals with York finishing in 17th place in the 2008–09 Conference Premier table.

=== Return to Australia ===
McBreen made his debut for North Queensland Fury in a 3–2 home defeat to Sydney FC on 8 August 2009 as an 82nd-minute substitute for Paul Kohler. He soon established himself in the starting line-up, and scored his first goal for the Fury after heading in a Fred Agius cross in the 87th minute of a 3–3 draw with Adelaide United on 28 August. He went on to sign a two-year pre-contract with A-League opponents Central Coast Mariners, for the 2010–11 and 2011–12 seasons, in December. McBreen was used mostly as a substitute after the move was announced, before signing an interim contract with Perth Glory for the remainder of the 2009–10 season in a swap for Jimmy Downey on 12 January 2010. He had scored 3 goals in 21 appearances for the Fury.

McBreen's debut for the Glory came when he entered a 6–2 away loss to Melbourne Victory as a 38th-minute substitute for Chris Coyne on 16 January 2010. He started and scored in the next match three days later, a 3–2 away win over Adelaide United, with the winning goal in the 77th minute. This marked the start of a run of five goals from four matches, helping the Glory finish fifth in the 2009–10 A-League table and thus qualify for the finals series. McBreen played in their 4–2 penalty shoot-out defeat to Wellington Phoenix in the fourth v fifth semi-final on 21 February, which followed a 1–1 draw after extra time. He had scored five goals in seven appearances for the Glory, and with eight goals altogether he was the 2009–10 A-League's eighth highest scorer. His good form was rewarded with his first call-up for the Australia national team.

McBreen made his debut for the Mariners in 1–0 away win over Melbourne Heart on 5 August 2010, in which he was substituted for Nik Mrdja in the 90th minute. His first goal came nearly a month later when heading in Matt Simon's cross in the 50th minute of a 2–0 home win over Melbourne Victory on 3 September. McBreen was sent off for the first time since returning to Australia with a second yellow card during the stoppage time of a 5–1 home defeat to Brisbane Roar on 28 November, and returned from suspension as a 52nd-minute substitute for Adam Kwasnik in a 1–1 draw away to Perth Glory on 12 December. With a second-placed finish in the 2010–11 A-League table the Mariners qualified for the finals series, and he started in their 4–2 aggregate defeat to Brisbane Roar in the major semi-final and their 1–0 win over Gold Coast United in the preliminary final. McBreen came on as a 72nd-minute substitute for Simon in the 2011 A-League Grand Final at Lang Park on 13 March 2011, and after a 2–2 extra time draw he missed one of the penalty kicks as the Mariners lost the shoot-out 4–2. He made 31 appearances and scored 5 goals for the Mariners in 2010–11.

Early into the 2011–12 A-League season he was deployed as the focal of a midfield diamond, and this contributed to the team's improving form. McBreen scored his first goal of the season in a 3–1 home win over Melbourne Heart, with an 82nd-minute penalty kick, and his only A-League goal scored in normal play came after converting Pedj Bojic's cross in a 3–2 home victory over Adelaide United on 21 January 2012. The Mariners became the A-League Premiers after finishing in first place in the 2011–12 table, also qualifying for the finals series. He appeared as a substitute in the first leg of their 5–2 aggregate defeat to Brisbane Roar in the major semi-final, and as a substitute in the preliminary final against Perth Glory, in which the Mariners were beaten 5–3 in a penalty shoot-out after a 1–1 extra time draw. McBreen made five appearances and scored twice in the 2012 AFC Champions League, as they were eliminated from the tournament after finishing third in their group. He scored 4 goals from 30 matches in 2011–12, and was handed a new contract with the Mariners for the 2012–13 A-League in April.

McBreen's first goal of 2012–13 came seven minutes after entering the Mariners's 1–0 win at home to Perth Glory as a 63rd-minute substitute, in what was his first appearance of the season. He recorded the first hat-trick in the Mariners' history in their 7–2 home win over Sydney FC on 3 November 2012, scoring in the first half with a penalty kick and in the second half with a close range finish and a header from Josh Rose's cross. This marked the start of a run of 14 goals from 15 matches, helping the Mariners to second place in the 2012–13 A-League table and thus a place in the finals series. With 17 goals McBreen won the A-League Golden Boot, awarded to the division's top scorer. In the semi-final of the finals series he scored the only goal in the Mariner's 1–0 win over Melbourne Victory on 14 April 2013 with a powerful shot in the 42nd minute. One week later he scored the second goal with a 68th-minute penalty kick as the Mariners beat Western Sydney Wanderers 2–0 at Sydney Football Stadium in the 2013 A-League Grand Final. This was the first time the Mariners had won the A-League Championship, and McBreen was awarded the Joe Marston Medal, given to the man of the match of the Grand Final, before being named as a substitute in the PFA A-League Team of the Season. He made six appearances in the team's run to the round of 16 of the AFC Champions League, when they were beaten 5–1 on aggregate by Guangzhou Evergrande of the Chinese Super League. McBreen signed a new contract with the Mariners for the 2013–14 A-League in May, having scored 19 goals from 33 appearances in 2012–13.

=== Spells in Asia ===
On 8 June 2013, McBreen joined Chinese Super League team Shanghai Dongya on a five-month loan lasting until 31 October, joining his former teammate Bernie Ibini-Isei who completed his transfer four days earlier. His debut came a month later after starting Shanghai's 3–0 home defeat to Beijing Guoan on 7 July, and a week later scored his first goal in the 10th minute of a 3–0 away victory over Guizhou Renhe. He scored 3 goals in 13 appearances for Shanghai before returning for the Mariners when starting their 1–0 home defeat to the Brisbane Roar on 10 November. McBreen's first goal for the Mariners in the 2013–14 A-League came with a close-range backheel with the only goal in a 1–0 victory at home to Sydney FC on 7 December.

McBreen scored twice in 12 appearances for the Mariners in 2013–14 before signing for Shanghai Dongya permanently on a one-season contract for a fee of $250,000 on 31 January 2014. His second debut came when starting their 1–1 away draw with Liaoning Hongyun on 9 March, before scoring his first goal of the 2014 Chinese Super League with a left-footed volley from outside the penalty area in a 1–1 draw at home to Shanghai Greenland Shenhua on 26 April. He went without scoring in the final three months of the season, which he finished with 5 goals from 28 appearances as Shanghai ranked in fifth place in the 2014 Chinese Super League table. McBreen stated his desire to stay for another season, but admitted he might not be retained after the club was taken over by new owners.

He signed for Hong Kong Premier League club South China for the remainder of the 2014–15 Hong Kong Premier League on 21 January 2015. McBreen debuted four days later as a 77th-minute substitute for Yuto Nakamura in a 4–2 away win over Sun Pegasus, before scoring twice in their 6–1 away victory against Global in the 2015 AFC Cup group stage on 25 February. He started for South China in their 4–0 defeat to Kitchee in the 2014–15 Hong Kong League Cup Final at Mong Kok Stadium on 22 April. McBreen scored both of the team's goals in their 2–0 victory over Eastern Sports Club in the AFC Cup play-off semi-final, and started their 1–1 extra time draw with YFCMD in the final, but was substituted before the 4–2 penalty shoot-out win. South China finished fourth in the 2014–15 Hong Kong Premier League table, and McBreen scored 11 goals from 17 appearances before his contract expired in May.

== International career ==
Australia national team coach Pim Verbeek selected McBreen in an extended squad of 25 players for the 2011 AFC Asian Cup qualifier against Indonesia in Brisbane on 3 March 2010. He was an unused substitute as Australia beat Indonesia 1–0.

== Style of play ==
McBreen played as a striker and was good in the air and adept at holding the ball up and bringing teammates into play. At 6 feet 1 inch (1.86 m), he posed a threat at set pieces. North Queensland Fury coach Ian Ferguson commented on his physicality, describing him as "an aggressive player ... who will give centre halves a hard time".

== Coaching career ==
McBreen was appointed as the head coach of the Newcastle Jets under-15 team in October 2015, and remained playing on a semi-professional basis with former club Edgeworth in the National Premier Leagues Northern NSW for the 2016 season. He retired from playing at the end of the 2019 season and was appointed as the head coach of the Newcastle Jets youth team on 13 September 2019. In April 2022, he left his post as coach, amid suggestions he and football manager Craig Deans had lost faith in the club's management.

== Media career ==
Since 2021, McBreen has worked for Network 10 providing commentary and punditry on the Australia men's national soccer team and A-League Men matches.

== Personal life ==
Before turning professional McBreen worked a number of jobs along with playing football, saying "I did everything – too many jobs to mention – and I know I would rather be on the training ground than sat in an office or hauling concrete all day". He married Gabrielle Stockton in Sydney, New South Wales in December 2014 and the couple have two sons, Noah and Leo.

== Career statistics ==
Appearances and goals by club, season and competition
Club	Season	League			National cup (Note: Includes Scottish Cup, FA Cup, Chinese FA Cup, Hong Kong FA Cup, FFA Cup)		League cup (Note: Includes Scottish League Cup, Hong Kong League Cup)		Continental		Other		Total	
Club	Season	Division	Apps	Goals	Apps	Goals	Apps	Goals	Apps	Goals	Apps	Goals	Apps	Goals
Newcastle United	2000–01	National Soccer League	23	6	—		—		—		—		23	6
Newcastle United	2001–02	National Soccer League	13	3	—		—		—		—		13	3
Newcastle United	Total		36	9	—		—		—		—		36	9
Universitatea Craiova	2002–03	Divizia A	13	1			—		—		—		13	1
Universitatea Craiova	2003–04	Divizia A	20	2			—		—		—		20	2
Universitatea Craiova	Total		33	3			—		—		—		33	3
Falkirk	2004–05	Scottish First Division	23	13	1	0	0	0	—		2 (Note: Appearances in Scottish Challenge Cup)	0	26	13
Falkirk	2005–06	Scottish Premier League	32	6	4	2	2	0	—		—		38	8
Falkirk	Total		55	19	5	2	2	0	—		2	0	64	21
Scunthorpe United	2006–07	League One	7	0	1	0	0	0	—		2 (Note: Appearances in Football League Trophy)	0	10	0
Scunthorpe United	2007–08	Championship	0	0	0	0	0	0	—		—		0	0
Scunthorpe United	Total		7	0	1	0	0	0	—		2	0	10	0
York City (loan)	2007–08	Conference Premier	5	2	—		—		—		—		5	2
St Johnstone	2007–08	Scottish First Division	6	0	1	1	—		—		—		7	1
York City	2008–09	Conference Premier	38	5	2	0	—		—		8 (Note: Seven appearances and five goals in FA Trophy, one appearance in Conference League Cup)	5	48	10
North Queensland Fury	2009–10	A-League	21	3	—		—		—		—		21	3
Perth Glory	2009–10	A-League	7	5	—		—		—		—		7	5
Central Coast Mariners	2010–11	A-League	31	5	—		—		—		—		31	5
Central Coast Mariners	2011–12	A-League	25	2	—		—		5 (Note: Appearances in AFC Champions League)	2	—		30	4
Central Coast Mariners	2012–13	A-League	27	19	—		—		6	0	—		33	19
Central Coast Mariners	2013–14	A-League	12	2	—		—		—		—		12	2
Central Coast Mariners	Total		95	28	—		—		11	2	—		106	30
Shanghai Dongya (loan)	2013	Chinese Super League	13	3	0	0	—		—		—		13	3
Shanghai Dongya	2014	Chinese Super League	28	5	0	0	—		—		—		28	5
Shanghai Dongya	Total		41	8	0	0	—		—		—		41	8
South China	2014–15	Hong Kong Premier League	4	0	2	1	2	0	7 (Note: Appearances in AFC Cup)	8	2 (Note: Appearances in AFC Cup play-offs)	2	17	11
Edgeworth	2016	National Premier Leagues Northern NSW	18	9	5	10	—		—		3 (Note: Appearance(s) in National Premier Leagues finals series)	1	26	20
Edgeworth	2017	National Premier Leagues Northern NSW	18	4	5	4	—		—		2	2	25	10
Edgeworth	2018	National Premier Leagues Northern NSW	18	6	3	2	—		—		1	0	22	8
Edgeworth	2019	National Premier Leagues Northern NSW	12	3	3	3	—		—		—		15	6
Edgeworth	Total		66	22	16	19	—		—		6	3	88	44
Career total			414	104	27	23	4	0	18	10	20	10	845	147

== Honours ==
Falkirk

- Scottish First Division: 2004–05
- Scottish Challenge Cup: 2004–05

York City

- FA Trophy runner-up: 2008–09

Central Coast Mariners

- A-League Premiership: 2011–12
- A-League Championship: 2012–13

Edgeworth

- National Premier Leagues Northern NSW: 2016, 2019

Individual

- A-League Golden Boot: 2012–13
- Joe Marston Medal: 2013
- PFA A-League Team of the Season: 2012–13
