= Sung Hwan Kim =

South Korean video and installation artist

- 김성환
- Born: 1975 (age 50–51); Seoul, South Korea
- Education: Seoul National University (architecture studies); Williams College (BA, 2000); Massachusetts Institute of Technology (MS, 2003); Rijksakademie van beeldende kunsten (residency, 2004–2005)
- Known for: Video art, installation art, performance art
- Notable work: From the commanding heights… (2007); Temper Clay (2012); A Record of Drifting Across the Sea (2017–)
- Awards: Hermès Korea Missulsang (2007); Prix de Rome, second prize (2007); Karl-Sczuka-Förderpreis (2010, jointly with David Michael DiGregorio); Guggenheim Fellowship (2021)
- Website: sunghwankim.org

Sung Hwan Kim (born 1975 in Seoul) is a South Korean contemporary artist working in video art, installation art, performance art, drawing, and sound. He is based in Honolulu, Hawaiʻi. His practice combines personal narratives, historical research, folklore, and music, often in collaboration with musician David Michael DiGregorio (also known as dogr).

His ongoing film and installation series A Record of Drifting Across the Sea (2017–) examines histories of Korean migration through Hawaiʻi and their intersections with other migrant and Indigenous communities. The series is the subject of Janine Armin's monograph Sung Hwan Kim: A Record of Drifting Across the Sea, published in the Afterall Books One Work series in 2025.

His mid-career survey Protected by roof and right-hand muscles was presented at the Van Abbemuseum, Eindhoven (2023–2024), and ZKM (2024–2025). A reconfigured version, titled Dirt in the Shape of You, opened at Bergen Kunsthall in October 2026. He has also exhibited at the Museum of Modern Art, New York, Tate Modern, the Seoul Museum of Art, the National Museum of Modern and Contemporary Art, Korea, daadgalerie, and international exhibitions including the Venice Biennale (2017), Gwangju Biennale (2021), Busan Biennale (2022), and Hawaiʻi Triennial (2022 and 2025).

Kim received a Guggenheim Fellowship in 2021 and participated in the DAAD Artists-in-Berlin Program in 2015.

In 2010, Kim and David Michael DiGregorio jointly received the Karl-Sczuka-Förderpreis for their radio work one from in the room. Kim also received the second prize of the Dutch Prix de Rome and the Hermès Korea Missulsang in 2007.

== Education and early career ==
Kim studied architecture for one year at Seoul National University before studying mathematics and art at Williams College in Massachusetts. He graduated from Williams College with a bachelor's degree in mathematics and art in 2000 and received a Master of Science in Visual Studies from the Massachusetts Institute of Technology in 2003. From 2004 to 2005, he was a resident at the Rijksakademie van beeldende kunsten in Amsterdam.

== Work ==
Kim works in video, performance, drawing, and other media, often incorporating autobiographical material together with fictional or folkloric narratives. His 2007 video From the Commanding Heights... presents daily life in a Seoul apartment complex interwoven with heresy and rumours about the South Korean president Park Chung-hee; these stories are illustrated by drawings made on camera.

Some of his installation work incorporates architectural elements on which images are projected. Music and sound produced in collaboration with David Michael DiGregorio are integrated into these environments.

In 2012, the Tate Modern commissioned his work Temper Clay for presentation in "The Tanks" on the ground floor of the museum. Kim used William Shakespeare's King Lear to examine family relationships, and social hierarchies in South Koreausing domestic settings, performed gestures, voiceover, video and music. In 2021, the work was shown again at the Museum of Modern Art within an installation incorporating drawings and objects created specifically for the New York venue.

== Critical reception ==
In 2009, the art critic Jonathan Griffin analyzed Kim's videos in relation to autobiography, invented narratives, and rumour.

A 2011 review by Colin Perry of Kim's show at the Queens Museum of Art, associated his work with experimental autobiographical video art. The critic also expressed his reservations about the digressive structure and length of Kim's videos while praising their visual inventiveness.

== Selected publications ==
- Sung Hwan Kim: Source Book 6. Rotterdam: Witte de With Center for Contemporary Art, 2009. ISBN 9789073362864.
- Talk or Sing. Seoul: SAMUSO Space for Contemporary Art, 2014. ISBN 9788993535280.
- Sung Hwan Kim: Protected by roof and right-hand muscles. Edited by Sung Hwan Kim and Yolande Zola Zoli van der Heide. Cologne: Verlag der Buchhandlung Walther und Franz König, 2025. ISBN 9783753307053.
