= 2019 Northern NSW Football season =

Northern NSW Football
- Season: 2019

The 2019 Northern NSW Football season was the sixth season under the new competition format in northern New South Wales.

== League Tables ==
=== 2019 National Premier League Northern NSW ===
At the end of the season, the Newcastle Jets Youth team transferred to the National Premier Leagues NSW, within the newly created NPL4 Division. They were subsequently promoted to the NPL2 Division mid-season, when the 2020 season resumed in July.

NPL Northern NSW
- Season: 2019
- Champions: Edgeworth Eagles
- Premiers: Maitland FC
- Relegated: -
- Top goalscorer: -

| Pos | Team | Pld | W | D | L | GF | GA | GD | Pts | Qualification or relegation |
|---|---|---|---|---|---|---|---|---|---|---|
| 1 | Maitland FC | 20 | 13 | 4 | 3 | 44 | 27 | +17 | 43 | 2019 National Premier Leagues Finals |
| 2 | Lambton Jaffas | 20 | 11 | 5 | 4 | 39 | 18 | +21 | 38 | 2019 Northern NSW Finals |
| 3 | Edgeworth Eagles (C) | 20 | 12 | 2 | 6 | 44 | 24 | +20 | 38 | 2019 Northern NSW Finals |
| 4 | Broadmeadow Magic | 20 | 11 | 5 | 4 | 46 | 29 | +17 | 38 | 2019 Northern NSW Finals |
| 5 | Weston Bears | 20 | 11 | 4 | 5 | 44 | 33 | +11 | 37 | |
| 6 | Charlestown City Blues | 20 | 11 | 3 | 6 | 35 | 24 | +11 | 36 | |
| 7 | Hamilton Olympic | 20 | 7 | 4 | 9 | 33 | 32 | +1 | 25 | |
| 8 | Newcastle Jets Youth | 20 | 6 | 3 | 11 | 29 | 41 | −12 | 21 | Transferred to 2020 NSW NPL 4 / 2020 NSW NPL 2 |
| 9 | Lake Macquarie City | 20 | 3 | 3 | 14 | 23 | 54 | −31 | 12 | |
| 10 | Valentine FC | 20 | 3 | 3 | 14 | 28 | 60 | −32 | 12 | |
| 11 | Adamstown Rosebud | 20 | 3 | 2 | 15 | 20 | 43 | −23 | 11 | |

Source: sportstg.com
Rules for classification: 1) points; 2) goal difference; 3) number of goals scored.
(C) Champions

==== Finals ====
Semi-finals
1 | Maitland FC (a) | 2 | 1 | 3
4 | Broadmeadow Magic | 2 | 1 | 3
2 | Lambton Jaffas | 1 | 0 | 1
3 | Edgeworth Eagles | 4 | 1 | 5

Grand Final
1 | Maitland FC | 0
3 | Edgeworth Eagles | 2

== Cup Competitions ==
=== FFA Cup Preliminary rounds ===
Northern NSW soccer clubs competed in 2019 within the Northern NSW Preliminary rounds for the 2019 FFA Cup. In addition to the A-League club Newcastle Jets, the two Round 7 winners - Edgeworth FC and Maitland FC - qualified for the final rounds of the FFA Cup, entering at the Round of 32. Edgeworth FC reached the Round of 16.
