= Patrick Zwaanswijk =

Dutch footballer (born 1975)

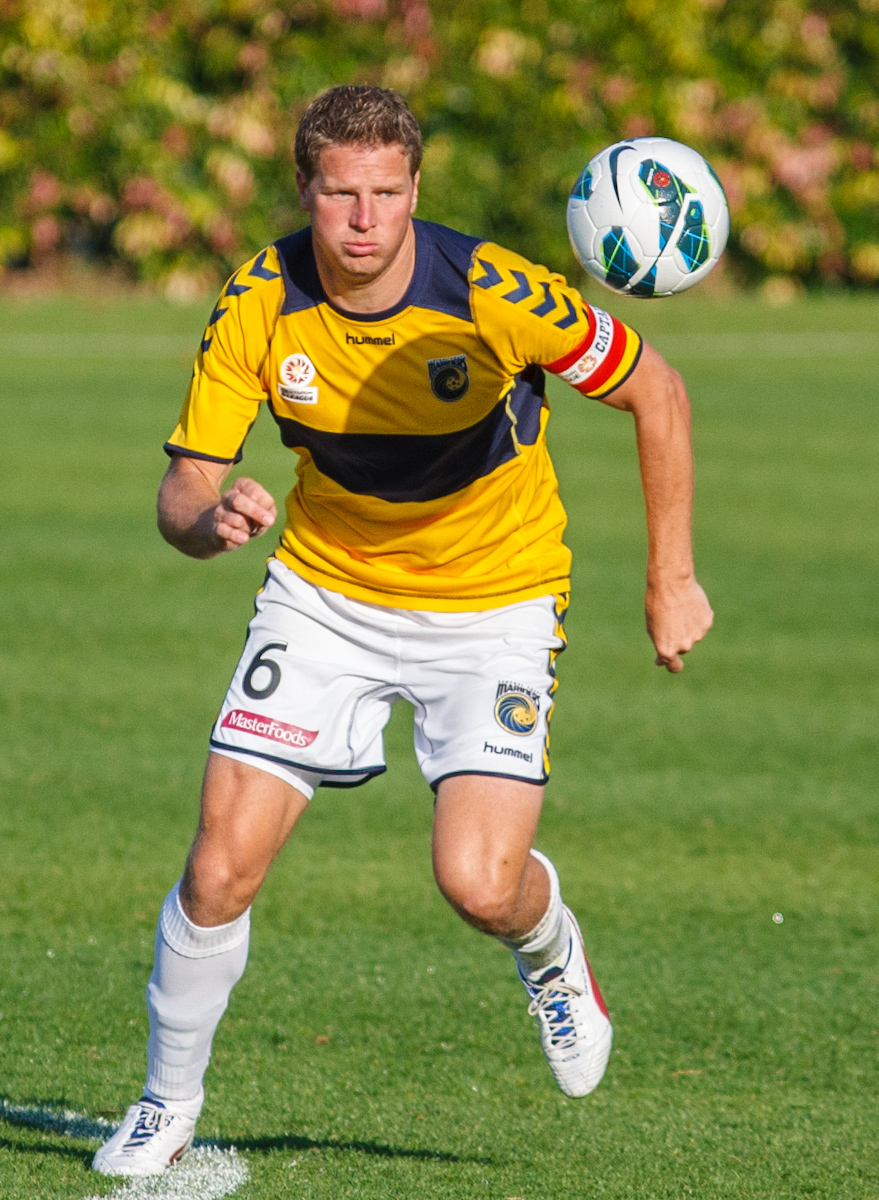

Personal information
- Full name: Patricius Josef Zwaanswijk
- Date of birth: 17 January 1975 (age 51)
- Place of birth: Haarlem, Netherlands
- Height: 1.90 m (6 ft 3 in)
- Position: Centre back

Team information
- Current team: Manly United (head coach)

Youth career
- 1980–1983: TYBB
- 1983–1988: VV Schoten
- 1988–1991: DCO
- 1992–1995: VV Schoten
- 1995–1998: Ajax FC

Senior career*
Years	Team	Apps	(Gls)
1998–2004	FC Utrecht	214	(27)
2004–2005	Oita Trinita	32	(1)
2005–2010	NAC Breda	161	(10)
2010–2013	Central Coast Mariners	99	(11)

Managerial career
- 2013–2014: Central Coast Mariners Academy
- 2018–2020: Hills United
- 2020–2021: Western Sydney Wanderers Youth
- 2023–: Manly United
- * Club domestic league appearances and goals as of 1 November 2014

Patrick Zwaanswijk (born 17 January 1975) is a Dutch former professional footballer. A product of the Ajax Youth Academy, Zwaanswijk retired from professional football in 2013 following a successful career with Ajax FC, FC Utrecht, Oita Trinita, NAC Breda and Central Coast Mariners FC. He played predominantly as a central defender throughout his career. After his career, he played for and captained Southern & Ettalong United in Australia's Central Coast Premier League and Terrigal United. He is married to Leah Maree Zwaanswijk and has two children (Dominique Louise Zwaanswijk and Angelo Zwaanswijk) from his first marriage. He lives in Australia, North Avoca since 2015.

== Club career ==
Zwaanswijk played for 11 seasons in the Dutch Eredivisie 6 years with FC Utrecht and 5 years with NAC Breda.

His professional career started with FC Utrecht where he debuted in the ERE-Divisie against Willem II. (1–0 loss) After 6 years at Utrecht, (4 years UEFA Cup, 3 Amstel Cup Finals and 2 KNVB Cup trophies) he joined Oita Trinita Japan After playing under manager Han Berger in the J-League for 14 months made the family miss Europe. He moved back to Holland NAC Breda where he played in the ERE-Divisie until 2010. With NAC Breda he achieved a 3rd Place in 2008 qualifying for Champions League football. He played 189 games for NAC Breda (UEFA Cup, ERE-Divisie and Amstel Cup).

In 2010, Zwaanswijk moved to Australia to join A-League club Central Coast Mariners. He scored his first goal for the Mariners on 2 October 2010 – a late winner against North Queensland Fury.

Zwaanswijk signed a one-year contract extension with the Mariners for the 2012–13 season in May 2012. He scored the opening goal of the 2013 A-League Grand Final on 22 April 2013, heading in a corner to open the scoring against Western Sydney Wanderers. The Mariners went on to win the game 2–0, with Zwaanswijk suggesting after the match that he was considering retirement.

In May 2013, Zwaanswijk announced he would be retiring from football after the club's 2013 AFC Champions League Round of 16 tie against Guangzhou Evergrande, but would be staying on with the Mariners as coach of the Mariners' youth team in the National Youth League.

== Managerial career ==
The Mariners terminated Zwaanswijk's contract after his side finished last in the 2013–14 National Youth League. Zwaanswijk pursued legal action against the Mariners for wrongful dismissal.

In November 2018, Zwaanswijk was appointed head coach of Hills United in National Premier Leagues NSW 2.

In September 2020, Zwaanswijk was appointed head coach of Western Sydney Wanderers Youth for the remainder of the season in National Premier Leagues NSW.

In August 2022, Zwaanswijk was appointed head coach of Manly United FC men's first grade side for the 2023 season.

== Club statistics ==
Club performance			League	
Season	Club	League	Apps	Goals
Netherlands			League	
1998/99	FC Utrecht	Eredivisie	11	1
1999/00	FC Utrecht	Eredivisie	26	3
2000/01	FC Utrecht	Eredivisie	31	3
2001/02	FC Utrecht	Eredivisie	31	5
2002/03	FC Utrecht	Eredivisie	29	0
2003/04	FC Utrecht	Eredivisie	31	6
Japan			League	
2004	Oita Trinita	J1 League	17	01
2005	Oita Trinita	J1 League	15	0
Netherlands			League	
2005/06	NAC Breda	Eredivisie	31	1
2006/07	NAC Breda	Eredivisie	32	1
2007/08	NAC Breda	Eredivisie	30	3
2008/09	NAC Breda	Eredivisie	34	3
2009/10	NAC Breda	Eredivisie	30	2
Australia			League	
2010/11	Central Coast Mariners	A-League	33	3
2011/12	Central Coast Mariners	A-League	29	8
2012/13	Central Coast Mariners	A-League	25	1
Country	Netherlands		316	28
Country	Japan		32	1
Country	Australia		99	12
Total			447	41

== Honours ==
FC Utrecht

- KNVB Cup: 2002–03, 2003–04

Central Coast Mariners

- A-League Champions: 2012–13
- A-League Premiership: 2011–12
