= Football Far North Coast =

Association football governing body in New South Wales, Australia

- Abbreviation: FFNC
- Headquarters: Goonellabah, New South Wales
- General Manager: Steve Mackney
- Parent organisation: Northern NSW Football
- Website: www.footballfarnorthcoast.com.au

Football Far North Coast (FFNC) is the governing body controlling association football on the Far North Coast of New South Wales, Australia. The name of the organisation was changed in late 2005 from Soccer Far North Coast in line with the national governing body which changed from Soccer Australia to Football Federation Australia.

FFNC is governed by Northern New South Wales Football, which is one of two organisations governing state level association football (soccer) in New South Wales (the other being Football New South Wales). There are nine senior men's leagues, from the Premier League to League Seven and six senior women's leagues – Women's Premier League to League Five. The top league controlled by Football Far North Coast is the Premier League, of which 10 teams currently compete. The team who finishes last in the Premier League is usually relegated to the men's Championship League.

== All participating clubs in Football Far North Coast - 2024 ==
In 2024, there are currently 25 clubs registered through Football Far North Coast. These clubs, and the highest league they participate in, are located below.

FFNC Clubs 2024	Highest League 2024
Alstonville FC	Premier League
Ballina SC	Premier League
Bangalow SC	Premier League
Burringbar FC	League 1
Byron Bay FC	Premier League
Casino RSM Cobras FC	Championship
Dunoon United FC	League 3
Eureka FC	League 5
Goonellabah FC	Premier League
Kyogle FC	League 3
Lennox Head FC	Premier League
Lismore Richmond Rovers FC	Premier League
Lismore Thistles FC	League 1
Lismore Workers FC	League 6
Maclean FC	Premier League
Mullimbimby Brunswick Valley FC	Premier League
Nimbin Headers FC	Championship
Pottsville Beach FC	Championship
Shores United FC	League 2
South Lismore Celtic FC	Premier League
Suffolk Park FC	League 1
Tintenbar East Ballina FC	League 2
Tumbulgum Rangers SC	League 2
Uki Pythons FC	League 6
Woodburn Wolves FC	League 3

== Men's Premier League/First Division history ==
Season	ANZAC Cup/ANZAC Shield	Premiers	Cyril Mayo Cup (Grand final Winners)	Tristrams Cup	Northern Star Cup	Fosters Mid-Week Cup
2024	Richmond Rovers (6th)	Bangalow (2nd)	Bangalow (3rd)			
2023	Bangalow (2nd)	Bangalow (1st)	Bangalow (2nd)			
2022	Not played due to Flood	Richmond Rovers (11th)	South Lismore (2nd)			
2021	South Lismore (1st)	Richmond Rovers (10th)	Not played due to COVID-19			
2020	Goonellabah (5th)	South Lismore (2nd)	Byron Bay (6th)			
2019	Bangalow (1st)	Byron Bay (5th)	South Lismore (2nd)			
2018	Lismore Thistles (8th)	Richmond Rovers (9th)	Byron Bay (5th)			
2017	Byron Bay (4th)	Byron Bay (4th)	Byron Bay (4th)			
2016	Richmond Rovers (5th)	Goonellabah (7th)	Bangalow (1st)			
2015	Lennox Head (1st)	Byron Bay (3rd)	Richmond Rovers (15th)			
2014	Lismore Thistles (7th)	Byron Bay (2nd)	Richmond Rovers (14th)			
2013	Lismore Thistles (6th)	Lismore Thistles (11th)	Byron Bay (3rd)			
2012	Lismore Workers (19th)	Richmond Rovers (8th)	Lismore Workers (13th)			
2011	Goonellabah (4th)	Richmond Rovers (7th)	Goonellabah (3rd)			
2010	Goonellabah (3rd)	Goonellabah (6th)	Richmond Rovers (13th)			
2009	Richmond Rovers (4th)	Richmond Rovers (6th)	Richmond Rovers (12th)			
2008	Richmond Rovers (3rd)	Richmond Rovers (5th)	Richmond Rovers (11th)			
2007	Byron Bay (3rd)	Richmond Rovers (4th)	Richmond Rovers (10th)			
2006	Goonellabah (2nd)	Byron Bay (1st)	Byron Bay (2nd)			
2005	Ballina (1st)	Goonellabah (5th)	Byron Bay (1st)			
2004	Byron Bay (2nd)	Richmond Rovers (3rd)	Lismore Workers (12th)			
2003	Byron Bay (1st)	Italo Stars (9th)	Italo Stars (10th)			
2002	Italo Stars (14th)	Italo Stars (8th)	Richmond Rovers (9th)			
2001	Lismore Workers (18th)	Maclean (2nd)	Maclean (1st)			
2000	Richmond Rovers (2nd)	Italo Stars (7th)	Italo Stars (9th)			
1999	Lismore Workers (17th)	Maclean (1st)	Richmond Rovers (8th)			
1998	Lismore Workers (16th)	Goonellabah (4th)	Richmond Rovers (7th)			
1997	Lismore Thistles (5th)	Lismore Workers (14th)	Casino (Cobras) (1st)			
1996	Lismore Workers (15th)	Lismore Workers (13th)	Richmond Rovers (6th)			
1995	Lismore Workers (14th)	Goonellabah (3rd)	Goonellabah (2nd)			
1994	Lismore Workers (13th)	Goonellabah (2nd)	Goonellabah (1st)			
1993	Lismore Workers (12th)	South Lismore (1st)	South Lismore (1st)			
1992	Italo Stars (13th)	Lismore Thistles (10th)	Lismore Thistles (11th)			Lismore Workers
1991	Lismore Workers (11th)	Lismore Thistles (9th)	Lismore Thistles (10th) & Richmond Rovers (5th)			Lismore Thistles
1990	Lismore Workers (10th)	Lismore Workers (12th)	Lismore Workers (11th)			Italo Stars
1989	Italo Stars (12th)	Lismore Workers (11th)	Lismore Workers (10th)			South Lismore
1988	Lismore Thistles (4th)	Italo Stars (6th)	Italo Stars (8th)			
1987	Italo Stars (11th)	Lismore Thistles (8th)	Richmond Rovers (4th)			
1986	Italo Stars (10th)	Richmond Rovers (2nd)	Richmond Rovers (3rd)			
1985	South Stars United (2nd)	Lismore Thistles (7th) (Undefeated)	Lismore Thistles (9th)			
1984	South Stars United (1st)	South Stars United (1st)	Eastwood United (9th)			
1983	Goonellabah (1st)	Goonellabah (1st)	Eastwood United (8th)			
1982	Eastwood United (9th)	Eastwood United (10th)	Lismore Thistles (8th)			
1981	Italo Stars (9th)	Eastwood United (9th)	Italo Stars (7th)			
1980	Italo Stars (8th)	Lismore Thistles (6th)	Italo Stars (6th)			
1979	Italo Stars (7th)	Eastwood United (8th)	Italo Stars (5th)			
1978	Italo Stars (6th)	Italo Stars (5th)	Italo Stars (4th)			
1977	Italo Stars (5th)	Italo Stars (4th)	Italo Stars (3rd)			
1976	Italo Stars (4th)	Italo Stars (3rd)	Lismore Thistles (7th)			
1975	Italo Stars (3rd)	Richmond Rovers (1st)	Richmond Rovers (2nd)			
1974	Italo Stars (2nd)	Italo Stars (2nd)	Lismore Thistles (6th)			
1973	Italo Stars (1st)	Lismore Thistles (5th)	Lismore Thistles (5th)			
1972	Eastwood United (8th)	Italo Stars (1st)	Lismore Thistles (4th)			
1971	Eastwood United (7th)	Eastwood United (7th)	Lismore Thistles (3rd)			
1970	Lismore Thistles (3rd)	Eastwood United (6th)	Lismore Thistles (2nd)			
1969	Eastwood United (6th)	Eastwood United (5th)	Italo Stars (2nd)			
1968	Eastwood United (5th)	Lismore Thistles Civics (4th)	Italo Stars (1st)			
1967	Eastwood United (4th)	Lismore Thistles White (3rd)	Eastwood United (7th)			
1966	Eastwood United (3rd)	Lismore Thistles No 1 (2nd)	Eastwood United (6th)			
1965	Richmond Rovers (1st)	Eastwood United (4th)	Eastwood United (5th)			
1964	Goonellabah Stars (9th)	Goonellabah Stars (10th)	Richmond Rovers (1st)			
1963	Goonellabah Stars (8th)	Goonellabah Stars (9th)	Lismore Thistles (1st)			
1962	Lismore Thistles (2nd)	Goonellabah Stars (8th)	Goonellabah Stars (7th)			
1961	Lismore Thistles (1st)	Lismore Thistles (1st)	Eastwood United (4th)			
1960	Goonellabah Stars (7th)	Goonellabah Stars (7th)	Goonellabah Stars (6th)			
1959	Eastwood United (2nd)	Eastwood United (3rd)	Goonellabah Stars (5th)			
1958	Eastwood United (1st)	Goonellabah Stars (6th)	Goonellabah Stars (4th)			
1957	Goonellabah Stars (6th)	Goonellabah Stars (5th)	Eastwood United (3rd)			
1956	Goonellabah Stars (5th)	Eastwood United (2nd)	Goonellabah Stars (3rd)			
1955	Goonellabah Stars (4th)	Goonellabah Stars (4th)	Goonellabah Stars (2nd)			
1954	Goonellabah Stars (3rd)	Eastwood United (1st)	Goonellabah Stars (1st)			
1953	Goonellabah Stars (2nd)	Goonellabah Stars (3rd)	Eastwood United (2nd)			
1952	Goonellabah Stars (1st)	Goonellabah Stars (2nd)	Eastwood United (1st)			
1951	Methodist United (2nd)	Goonellabah Stars (1st)	North Lismore (1st)			
1950	Methodist United (1st)	Methodist United (1st)	Casino (Rebels) (1st)			
1949		Lismore City (1st)				

== 2021 — The COVID-19 season take 2 ==
Like 2020 the 2021 season was impacted by COVID-19 with the number of fixtures reduced and finals cancelled.

In April South Lismore won their first ANZAC Day Cup, defeating Byron Bay 3–1 in the final. It was an emotional win for South Lismore as Cameron Hyde their much-loved former coach had died in the week leading up to the game. Goalscorers for South Lismore were Murray Towner (2) and Bodhi Estreich with Diego Vazquez slotting home a late penalty for Byron Bay. Harrison Armstrong (South Lismore) was named player of the match.

Also in April Byron Bay won the Callan McMillan Memorial Shield, defeating Lennox Head 2–0 in the final. Ali Dean (Byron Bay) was named player of the match.

In August the men's premiership was postponed due to COVID-19, and in September following advice from the NSW government that community sport wouldn't be able to recommence it was announced that the season had concluded. Given the circumstances it was a miracle that 16 of the 18-game season was played, although the finals were cancelled meaning there were no grand final winners.

It was a triumphant return to coaching for Brian Bugden, former Richmond Rovers coach and player who led the rejuvenated club from last in a COVID-shortened 2020 season to their 10th Premier League premiership. Bugden was named Premier League coach of the year.

=== 2021 Men's Premier League final table ===
Position	Club	Played	Won	Drew	Lost	For	Against	Goal Difference	Points
Premiers	Richmond Rovers	16	10	2	4	37	21	+16	32
2nd	South Lismore	16	10	1	5	34	20	+14	31
3rd	Bangalow	16	8	5	3	35	21	+14	29
4th	Byron Bay	16	8	4	4	31	17	+14	28
5th	Lismore Thistles	16	6	3	7	19	29	-10	21
6th	Alstonville	16	5	5	6	31	18	+13	20
7th	Goonellabah	16	4	5	7	21	30	-9	17
8th	Maclean	16	4	2	10	25	40	-15	14
9th	Lennox Head	16	2	3	11	13	47	-34	9

== 2020 — The COVID-19 season ==
The commencement of fixtures for the 2020 season was delayed until July by the COVID-19 pandemic and the season reduced to 10 games, with clubs playing up to 3 games per week to fit in the shortened season.

In December 2019 Byron Bay announced Belinda Wilson, former Brisbane Roar W-League and Young Matildas coach would coach the Byron Bay Premier Division side for the 2020 season. This was the first time a female coach had been appointed to an FFNC Premier Division club.

Maclean made a return to Premier League after last playing in FFNC competitions in 2007.

In September Goonellabah won their 5th ANZAC Day Cup, beating Alstonville 2–1 after extra time (1–1 at full-time) in a dramatic game at Crawford Park, Alstonville. For Goonellabah Chris Clarke slotted home a penalty in the first half. Jesse Fryer equalised for Alstonville with a brilliant strike from 25 metres with 10 minutes of normal time remaining. Just 3 minutes into extra-time, Reggie Sharp scored to give Goonellabah a 2–1 lead, and despite sustained Alstonville pressure, Goonellabah held on to win the ANZAC Cup.

South Lismore won their second Premier League premiership, losing just once to Bangalow. South Lismore's previous premiership was in 1993 when they won the premiership-Cyril Mayo Cup double. The seasons quiet achievers were Alstonville who made the finals for the first time since 2014 and by coming 3rd achieved their highest-ever placing, surpassing their 4th place in 1986.

=== Men's Premier League 2020 final table ===
Position	Club	Played	Won	Drew	Lost	For	Against	Goal difference	Points	2020 Cyril Mayo Cup	Results & venues	Goalscorers
Premiers	South Lismore	10	7	2	1	22	10	+12	23	Semi-final (1st v 4th)	South Lismore 3 defeated Bangalow 1 @ Caniaba Street, South Lismore	South Lismore – Ezra Frost, Murray Towner, Patrick Kable Bangalow – own goal
2nd	Byron Bay	10	7	1	2	26	15	+11	22	Semi-final (2nd v 3rd)	Byron Bay 3 defeated Alstonville 2 @ Byron Recreation Ground	Byron Bay – Diego Vazquez (2), Oliver Stautner Alstonville – Joel Perkins, Eli Gambley (penalty)
3rd	Alstonville	10	5	1	4	22	18	+4	16	Grand final	Byron Bay 2 defeated South Lismore 0 @ Caniaba Street, South Lismore	Byron Bay – Lisandro Luaces, Diego Vazquez (penalty)
4th	Bangalow	10	5	1	4	20	16	+4	16			
5th	Goonellabah	10	4	2	4	20	19	+1	14			
6th	Lismore Thistles	10	4	0	6	16	19	-3	12			
7th	Maclean	10	3	0	7	20	34	-14	9			
8th	Richmond Rovers	10	1	1	8	12	27	-15	4			

== History of association football in Northern NSW ==
=== 1911 – first evidence ===
There is evidence of "soccer enthusiasts" from the Oakland area meeting at Muldoon's Hotel in June 1911 to form a football association.

The first known game played under the British Association rules saw Oakland defeat Coraki on Saturday 8 July 1911.

The first football club formed in the Lismore area was the Lismore Athletic Football Club which was formed at the Lismore School of Arts in May 1914. The first game of football featuring a side from Lismore was played in June 1914 when students from the Wollongbar Experiment Farm played Lismore Athletic Soccer Club at the farm. The Lismore Athletic team was:

- Goalkeeper – Blackmore
- Backs – Newman and Caley
- Half-backs – Cochrane, Manning (captain), Alcock
- Forwards – Marshall, Stewart, Hope, Thomas & McBeth

The officials for the game were Mr Priestly (referee) and Mr R Hatt (linesman).

=== 1932 – first Lismore club & competition ===
The first Lismore club (it's possible that the Lismore Athletic Soccer Club of 1914 was a team only) was established in April 1932 at a meeting at the Golden Globe rooms. At that meeting, it was noted the club had 34 players and "the support of prominent Lismore citizens, including representatives of two churches"; Canon Moore (Church of England) and Reverend Parker (Presbyterian). The club adopted club colours of red and blue shirts and white shorts, and decided to enter a team in Bangalow's Association premiership competition that was initially supposed to include 6 teams:

- Bangalow (2 teams)
- McLeans Ridges
- Federal
- Mullumbimby
- Lismore

Only 3 teams nominated for the initial competition of the Northern Rivers Soccer Football Association with additional teams from Lismore, Ballina and McLeans Ridges being invited to compete in the end of season knockout competition:

- Bangalow Rangers
- Lismore AFC
- Federal

In May 1932 Lismore announced they had rented "An area of land at the corner of Diadem and Magellan streets" for use as a home ground.

The first game in the competition was played at Bangalow on Saturday, 14 May 1932 with Bangalow defeating Lismore 3–1. The teams were:

- Bangalow: Morrison, Graham, Hunt, Ramsden, W Turner, Macdonald, Jeffert, A Carter, Davies, Eldridge, J Carter
- Lismore: Fender, Williamson, Green, Daly, Holmes, Gilmour, Kinch, G Wightman, McCredie, Simpson, Temperley

New clubs were formed in Lismore in May and Casino in July 1932. The new Lismore club was probably called Lismore City.

In July 1932 an Association Cup competition attracted 6 teams: Bangalow, Lismore City, Casino, Dyraaba, Lismore & Federal.

=== Le Clare Cup ===
Football continued being played on a social basis and then on a more organised basis for the Le Clare Cup until 1939.

=== 1949 revival ===
Association Football in the Lismore district was revived after a 10-year hiatus in early 1949 by Constable Ossie (Oscar) Pomroy, a local policeman and Jack Connolly, a repatriation representative. Pomroy had played association football with the Police team in the Sydney competition. On Saturday 30 April 1949 the first competition game for 1949 was played at Lismore Recreation Ground between two under-16 teams; Brisbane Telegraph Rangers and Lismore Boys’ Hostel. In May 1949 a club was formed in Casino. The first senior game of the season was played at Lismore Recreation Ground on Saturday 28 May between a Lismore team and a Casino team with Lismore winning 4–1. The Casino team featured former Dutch international, Jack Dalmeyer. In June 1949 the Lismore and District Soccer Football Association, a predecessor to the current Football Far North Coast, was formed. The inaugural office bearers were:

- Patrons: Larry Anthony, Commonwealth member for Richmond and William Frith, NSW member for Lismore
- President: Maurice Guilmant
- Vice-presidents: R Hatt, C Lawman, J Robertson, Frank Oakes, Clarrie Richards, Ossie Pomroy, RM Frazer
- Secretary: RT McBain
- Treasurer: GJ Wightman
- Publicity Officer: Ossie Pomroy

The under-16 competition played for the Wilcher Cup donated by Wilcher's Dye Works of Keen Street, Lismore with 12 teams from 7 clubs competing:

1. North Lismore – Hotspurs, Thistle
2. East Lismore – Rovers, Athletic
3. South Lismore – Celtic, Albion
4. Hostel – United, Wanderers
5. Goonellabah Stars
6. Telegraph Rangers
7. City Rangers

North Lismore Hotspurs were the inaugural winners of the Wilcher Cup with South Lismore Celtic winning the junior cup final.

In seniors 5 teams participated in the competition:

1. Lismore City
2. North Lismore Marauders
3. Goonellabah Gold Stars
4. Methodist OK
5. Casino Rebels

Lismore City were the winners of the Challenge Cup which appears to have been the equivalent of the grand final, beating Casino 5–1 in the final. In September 1949 a Far North Coast representative team played Corinthians, the 1949 Brisbane soccer premiers. The game was played at Lismore Recreation Grounds, with Corinthians winning 7–1.

=== 1950 – formation of Eastwood United ===
Source: At a meeting in February 1950 Eastwood United was established comprising 2 junior teams (Under 14 and 18) and 1 senior team. It was agreed that club colours would be red shirts with white collars, pockets and sleeves, white shorts and red and white socks. The inaugural elected officials were:

- Patron – Dr RE Longworth
- President – Mr M (Maurice) Guilmant
- Secretary – Mr M Glendinning
- Assistant secretary – Mr E Wells
- Treasurer – Mr J Harrison
- Publicity Officer – Mr OH (Ossie) Pomroy

=== 1950 Brand Cup final (Casino Rebels win the final but not the Cup!) ===
The 1950 Arthur Brand Cup final between Eastwood United and Casino Rebels was played on Saturday, 9 September at the Lismore Recreation Ground (Recreation Ground Number 1). The game was of a high standard with Eastwood United winning 2–1 after extra time and being presented with the cup by Arthur Brand. Casino Rebels protested the result to the Lismore District Soccer Football Association (LDSFA) on the grounds that the refereeing of Mr Des Hyde had not been up to standard, and demanded a replay. In particular, it was reported Casino Rebels players 'began to leave the field when a goal ... (by their captain, Stan Pendrigh) ... was disallowed' and the legitimacy of Eastwood United's winning goal which had been scored direct from an indirect free-kick. The LDSFA upheld (supported) Casino Rebels protest and directed the final be replayed at Casino on Saturday, 23 September. Mr Stan Jarrett, the Secretary of the LDSFA resigned in protest at the decision. Eastwood United refused to play the re-match so the matter was referred to the NSW Soccer Association.

The re-match was eventually played at Casino on Saturday 30 September with Casino Rebels winning 2–0. The NSW Soccer Association ruled the 'referee's decision was final' (in relation to the first game) and as a consequence, the LDSFA decided Eastwood United would hold the cup for the next 12 months. So whilst Casino Rebels won the 1950 Brand Cup Final, Eastwood United had possession of the cup.

The Casino Rebels team for the re-match was:

- A Morgan (Goalkeeper), Stan Pendrigh (Captain), Jack Dalmeyer, L Fryer, G Snow, W Richardson, M De Haan, H Johns, F Koning, M Day, J Davy, J McElligott

The Eastwood United squad for the re-match was:

- H Pogulis (Goalkeeper), Jim Brady, S De Vries, Billy Stark, Ossie Pomroy (Captain), Billy Driver, L Moller, Bill Woolnough, J Docherty, J Felicia, N Manitta, Cliff Burrows, M Nutt, N Garrett

=== 1951 Brand Cup final 'the longest match in history ...' ===
The Brand Cup donated by Arthur Brand, a local pharmacist, was an end-of-season competition played on a knock-out basis. The 1951 Brand Cup final was between North Lismore Marauders and Methodist United. The first game, played on Saturday 25 August, was abandoned at 5:45 pm due to bad light after more than 2 hours play. The teams had played 90 minutes of normal time, and 2 sets of 20 minutes extra time. The score was 2-all at full time and 2-all when the game was abandoned. Goalscorers for North Lismore Marauders were S Miles and Cyril Mayo, whilst A Watson scored both goals for Methodist United. The game attracted more than 1,000 and possibly up to 1,500 fans with gate proceeds of more than 100 pounds being donated to the North Coast Children's Home.

The replay was played on Saturday 15 September. Both clubs made changes with North Lismore Marauders bringing in forwards Dirk Brouwer and Bill Owens, and Methodist United including local baseball star Reg Baxter. Owens, who had been called up for army training was given special leave to play and flown in specially for the game. North Lismore Marauders won the replay 3–1 and their only-ever trophy in Lismore football history. Goalscorers for North Lismore Marauders were ironically, Bill Owens (2) and Dirk Brouwer, whilst Allan Halls scored for Methodist United.

=== 1951 – establishment of breakaway Casino District Soccer Association ===
In March 1951 following a decision by the Lismore District Soccer Association to limit its boundaries to a radius of 25 miles from the Lismore Post Office, there were murmurings of a breakaway association centred on Casino. The proposed new association would encompass juniors and up to 7 senior teams: Casino (2), Bonalbo (2), Mallanganee, Dyraaba and Kyogle.

=== 1954 – drowning of LDSA secretary, Cliff Burrows ===
In July 1950 the Caledonians club from Brisbane visited Lismore to play the Far North Coast representative side. Cliff Burrows, a member of the Caledonians side was so impressed by Lismore that he returned to live there. Burrows, originally from the Leeds area in England, played for Eastwood United from 1950 to 1953 and was captain of the Church of Christ Crusaders side in 1954. Burrows was good enough to play for the Lismore City and Lismore representative sides against the Sutherland Shire Casuals and Grafton in 1954. Burrows also refereed.

In June 1954 Burrows was elected secretary of the Lismore District Soccer Association (LDSA) following the resignation of Mr Allan Halls. In September the same year, tragedy struck when Burrows drowned whilst surfing at Ballina Lighthouse Beach. Burrows was buried at Lismore Memorial Gardens on Skyline Road, Goonellabah.

The LDSA opened a fund to condition his grave and provide a suitable epitaph. In September 1955 a memorial was unveiled at Burrows' grave.

=== 1957 – visit by Eastern Athletic (Hong Kong) ===
In July 1957 a team described in the local press as the Chinese national team but actually Eastern Athletic from Hong Kong visited Lismore to play a Lismore District Soccer Association XI. This was the first time an International or State side had visited the Northern Rivers region of NSW. Eastern Athletic were a good side; in the week before playing the Lismore XI they drew 2-all with Australia and beat Queensland 5–3 in Brisbane.

The week leading up to the game was marred by injury. Firstly, the referee assigned to the game, Allan Halls from Lismore, was concussed in a car accident and there was some doubt he would take charge of the match. Secondly, Bill Smith the captain and central defender of the Lismore XI was injured playing for his club, Eastwood United the weekend before the game, and forced to withdraw. Bill Mullins of Grafton replaced Smith as captain.

Eastern Athletic soundly defeated the Lismore XI 6–0 at Oakes Oval, Lismore after it was 4–0 at half-time. The visitors put on a "display of precision football" on "a wet, slippery ground" with a "greasy ball" in front of a crowd of 1,500 ("the largest crowd ever to see soccer on the Northern Rivers") paying £300. According to the local newspaper the best players for the Lismore XI were R Parkhouse, Bill Mullins, Eric Moss (the youngest player in the team at 17 years of age), Charlie Kostic & L Orchard.

The Lismore XI, selected from the Lismore region and including players from Grafton and Casino was:

- R Parkhouse (Grafton, Goalkeeper), Gary Kuehne (Grafton), Bill Mullins (Grafton, Captain), Eric Moss (Grafton), Charlie Kostic (Grafton), L Orchard (Eastwood United, Lismore), Barry Neaves (Eastwood United, Lismore), B McPherson (Goonellabah Stars, Lismore), A Lee (Goonellabah Stars, Lismore), W van Beers (Casino) and F Laing (Grafton)

The match officials were:

- Referee – Allan Halls
- Linesmen – K Goudie, G Hayward

Eastern Athletic exists to this day, re-badged as Eastern Sports Club and currently playing in the Hong Kong Premier League.

=== 1958 – formation of Lismore Thistles ===
On Friday 31 January 1958 a meeting was held at the Boy's Hostel in Lismore to form a new club to play in Lismore & District Soccer Football Association competitions.

The meeting appointed Warren Bancroft as chairman. Others present at the meeting were to become stalwarts of the Lismore Thistles club including John Ryan, Barry Neaves, Lance Goldsmith, Nooky Lavis and Jim Rixon.

The meeting also agreed on:

- A club name – Thistles Soccer Club
- Club colours – Royal blue & white
- Club emblem – A thistle within a shield

In 1958, Lismore Thistles first season it had 1 team with twenty registered players playing in the First Division.

=== 1961 – formation of Richmond Rovers ===
In 1960 Goonellabah Stars won the treble of ANZAC Cup, premiership and grand final (or Championship for the Cyril Mayo Memorial Cup). Goonellabah Stars beat Lismore Thistles 4–3 in the grand final to win the Cyril Mayo Memorial Cup; the goalscorers being Goonellabah Stars – E Scurr, Earle McPherson, Athol Parmenter and Bill Harris (Captain), and for Lismore Thistles – R Lavis 3 goals. This was the third time in succession Goonellabah Stars had won the Cyril Mayo Memorial Cup since its donation in 1958.

In 1961 Irishman Bill Harris left Goonellabah Stars, the most successful club in the competition, to form a new club; Richmond Rovers. Harris' motivation was to "foster younger players ... create more interest in the code by expanding the competition, which he saw as lopsided due to Goonellabah Stars dominance". Harris was a former Irish schoolboy representative and English 1st Division player who had moved to Lismore in 1957 via Melbourne (where he played for Slavia).

Richmond Rovers became the 5th team in the Senior competition joining Casino Rovers, Eastwood United, Goonellabah Stars and Lismore Thistles. In their first game, an ANZAC Cup-tie, Richmond Rovers were beaten 7–0 by Lismore Thistles and in their first fixture game were beaten 2–1 by Casino Rovers. In its first season Richmond Rovers also fielded 2 junior teams; an Under-16 and an Under-14.

Members of the original Richmond Rovers side were: John Gava, Carl Ross, J Handley, David Flynn, D Cassis, M Bright, John Morrissey, Bill Harris, John Serone, G Perkins, John Farry (goalkeeper), Doug Edwards, Theo Donaldson, Barry Neaves and Arthur Maloney.

=== 1961 – visit by Fijian national team ===
In May and June 1961 the Fijian national team toured the Eastern States of Australia and played regional and State teams including a North Coast team at Oakes Oval, Lismore.

On Sunday 4 June in "greasy, treacherous conditions" the Fijians were "too fast" for the locals, winning 8–2 after it was 5–0 at half-time. Jim Smith scored both goals for the North Coast. Officials voted R Helmond, the North Coast goalkeeper as the best of the local players, whilst the local newspaper also praised Eddie Laycock (right back) and Jim Smith (centre forward). The game was watched by a crowd of 2,500

The local newspaper noted the North Coast captain Bill Harris (born in Northern Ireland) was the only North Coast player not born in Australia. The team included 8 players from Lismore, 2 from Murwillumbah and 1 from Macksville:

- R Helmood (goalkeeper), Eddie Laycock (right back), J Craven (left back), Bill Smith (right half and Vice-Captain), Earl McPherson (centre half), Ron Fiore (left half), B Dawson (outside right), Bill Harris (inside right and Captain), Jim Smith (centre forward), Ron Phillips (inside left) and E Crooks (outside left). Reserves were R Burns, J Gassner, W Van Meurick, A Parmenter and G Lavis.

The Fijians played 15 games on tour, winning 8, drawing 1 and losing 6 whilst scoring 76 goals and conceding 65. Some of the games against regional sides were cricket scores: Fiji 14 – Riverina 0 (in Wagga Wagga), Fiji 12 – Goulburn Districts 1 (in Goulburn), Fiji 9 – Murrumbidgee Irrigation Area 2 (in Griffith).

=== 1966 – fall of Goonellabah Stars (1949-65) ===
Goonellabah Stars, sometimes referred to as Goonellabah Gold Stars were established in 1949 and were part of the revival of football in the Lismore district after a 10-year absence. In its first season Goonellabah Stars fielded a senior team and an Under 16 team in the Wilcher Cup competition. Goonellabah Stars were the dominant club during their 17 years in senior competitions, with some of the region's best players and winning honours on 26 occasions:

- 9 ANZAC Cups – 1952, 1953, 1954, 1955, 1956, 1957, 1960, 1963, 1964
- 10 premierships – 1951, 1952, 1953, 1955, 1957, 1958, 1960, 1962, 1963, 1964
- 7 grand finals – 1954, 1955, 1956, 1958, 1959, 1960, 1962

In 1966 Goonellabah Stars seniors suddenly disappeared, although they continued as a junior club.

==== 1949 season ====
In their first season in 1949 Goonellabah Stars went trophyless coming 4th in the premiership (in a 5-team competition) and getting knocked out of the finals series by Lismore City. Players in the 1949 season included: K Packham (captain), J Teale, N Manitta, C Wagner, J Roach, L White, L Duff, N Adams, R Allen, A Andrews, K Bryant, J Doyle, R Packham, A Baker.

==== 1953 season – 3rd premiership, 2nd ANZAC Cup ====
1953 – final table – seniors

Position	Club	Played	Won	Drew	Lost	For	Against	Points	Arthur Brand Cup	Results & venues	Goalscorers
Premiers (Guilmant Cup Winners)	Goonellabah Stars	14	12	1	1	69	15	25	First Round	Goonellabah Stars 3 defeated Casino Rebels 2 at Oakes Oval	Goonellabah Stars – Barry McPherson, J Cravigan, T Sharpe Casino Rebels – G Snow, own goal
2nd	Eastwood United	14	12	0	2	44	14	24	First Round	Methodist United 3 defeated Goonellabah Rangers 0	Methodist United – M Marsh (2), A Watson
3rd	Methodist United	14	10	2	2	52	23	22	First Round	Crusaders 1 defeated Mallanganee 0 after extra time (0–0 at full-time) at Nielson Park, East Lismore	Crusaders – R Beaumont (penalty)
4th	Mallanganee	14	5	2	7	23	48	12	First Round	Eastwood United – Bye	
5th	Crusaders	14	4	2	8	19	44	10	Semi-final	Eastwood United 1 defeated Methodist United 0 at Lismore Recreation Ground No 3	Eastwood United – own goal
6th	Goonellabah Rangers	14	4	1	9	18	50	9	Semi-final	Crusaders 3 defeated Goonellabah Stars 2 at Lismore Recreation Ground No 3	Crusaders – Max Wagner, R Beaumont, V Pushae Goonellabah Stars – J Cravigan, McDermott
7th	Casino Rebels	14	3	0	11	16	47	6	Final	Eastwood United 1 defeated Crusaders 0 at Oakes Oval	Eastwood United – Bill Stark

==== 1963 season – 9th premiership, 8th ANZAC Cup ====
In 1963 Goonellabah Stars won their 9th premiership by 1 point from Lismore Thistles. Goonellabah Stars clinched the premiership in the last round of fixtures, beating last-placed Wallaroos 4–2 after Goonellabah Stars were trailing 2-1 until midway through the second half. A goal by 16-year old Robbie Donaldson (making his senior debut) and 2 late goals by Earl McPherson gave Goonellabah Stars the win and the premiership. Goalscorers for Goonellabah Stars were Earl McPherson (hat-trick) and Robbie Donaldson and for Wallaroos J Battese and Geoff Gray.

1963 – final table – 1st Division

Position	Club	Played	Won	Drew	Lost	For	Against	Points	Finals	Results	Goalscorers
Premiers	Goonellabah Stars	20	14	1	5	76	48	29	Semi-final (1st v 4th)	Goonellabah Stars 2 drew Eastwood United 2 after extra time (2–2 at full-time)	Goonellabah Stars – Earl McPherson, Arthur Maloney Eastwood United – Jim Matthews, Bob Helmood
2nd	Lismore Thistles	20	13	2	5	68	36	28	Semi-final (2nd v 3rd)	Lismore Thistles 5 defeated Casino Rovers 2	Lismore Thistles – Bill Mulford (2), Garry Jones, Ray Lavis, Ken McDonald Casino Rovers – P Mortenson, C Grennan
3rd	Casino Rovers	20	9	3	8	50	52	21	Semi-final Replay (1st v 4th)	Goonellabah Stars 4 defeated Eastwood United 3 after extra time (3–3 at full-time)	Goonellabah Stars – Arthur Maloney (2), Athol Parmenter (2) Eastwood United – Jim Matthews, F Bignill (2)
4th	Eastwood United	20	8	3	9	68	70	19	Grand final	Lismore Thistles 3 defeated Goonellabah Stars 1	Lismore Thistles – Bill Mulford (2), Ray Lavis Goonellabah Stars – Earl McPherson
5th	Richmond Rovers	20	6	3	11	53	68	15			
6th	Wallaroos	20	3	2	15	35	78	8			

==== 1964 season – 10th premiership ====
1964 – final table – seniors

Position	Club	Played	Won	Drew	Lost	For	Against	Points	Finals	Results	Goalscorers
Premiers	Goonellabah Stars	20	13	4	3	59	35	30	Semi-final (1st v 4th)	Goonellabah Stars 5 defeated Eastwood United 2	Goonellabah Stars – Nicky Sourry (hat-trick), Ron Fiore, Geoff Rose Eastwood United – E Laycock, J Toshack
2nd	Richmond Rovers	20	14	1	5	65	31	29	Semi-final (2nd v 3rd)	Richmond Rovers 4 defeated Lismore Thistles 0	Richmond Rovers – Dick Latta (hat-trick), Bill Harris
3rd	Lismore Thistles	20	11	4	5	56	32	26	Grand final	Richmond Rovers 3 defeated Goonellabah Stars 2	Richmond Rovers – Alec Mathews, Dave Flynn, Dick Latta Goonellabah Stars – Nicky Sourry, Arthur Maloney
4th	Eastwood United	20	11	3	5	76	53	25			
5th	Lismore City	20	4	0	16	38	104	8			
6th	Casino Rovers	20	1	0	19	28	67	2			

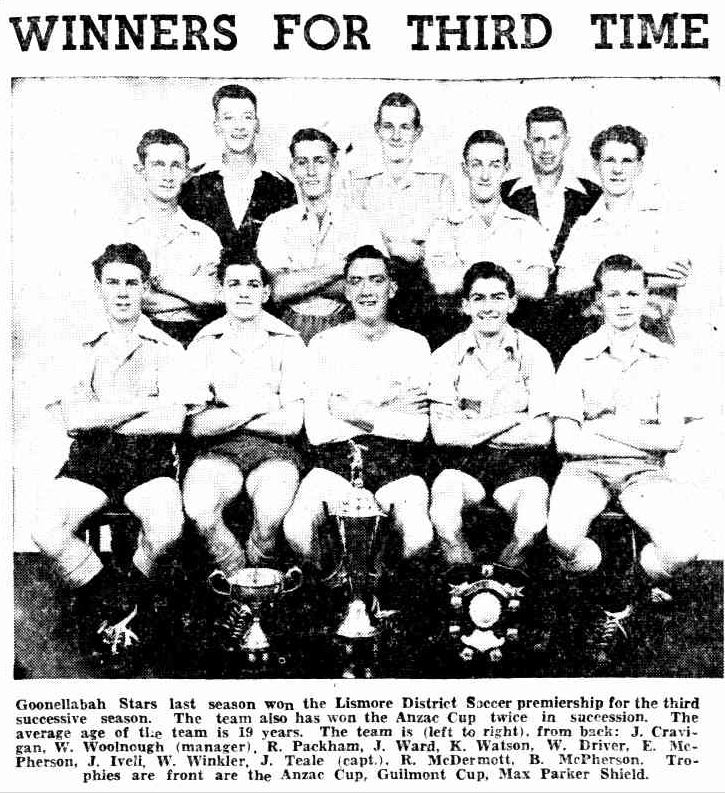
Goonellabah Stars, 1953

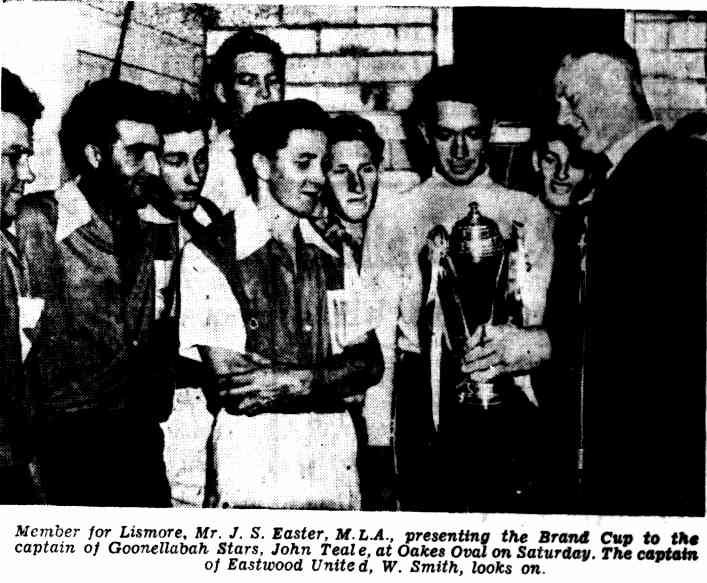
Goonellabah Stars, 1954

=== 1965 – Eastwood United wins premiership-Cyril Mayo Cup double ===
Position	Club	Played	Won	Drew	Lost	For	Against	Goal difference	Points	1965 Cyril Mayo Cup	Results & venues	Goalscorers
Premiers	Eastwood United	19	16	1	2	76	26	+50	33	Seeded team	Eastwood United automatically qualified for Semi-final	
2nd	Lismore Thistles	19	11	3	5	69	29	+40	25	Seeded team	Lismore Thistles automatically qualified for Semi-final	
3rd	Richmond Rovers	19	11	3	5	71	38	+33	25	Quarter-final (3rd v 5th)	Richmond Rovers defeated Grafton City on forfeit	
4th	Goonellabah Stars	19	7	3	9	55	55	0	17	Quarter-final (4th v 6th)	Goonellabah Stars 4 defeated Lismore City 2 @ Oakes Oval, Lismore	Goonellabah Stars – John Teale, Nicky Sourry, W Van Beers, own goal Lismore City – John Battese, W Tulk
5th	Grafton City	19	4	3	12	32	74	-42	11	Semi-final	Richmond Rovers 3 defeated Goonellabah Stars 2 @ Oakes Oval, Lismore	Richmond Rovers – Dick Latta (2), Other goalscorer unknown Goonellabah Stars – Athol Parmenter (2)
6th	Lismore City	19	0	3	16	24	105	-81	3	Semi-final	Eastwood United 2 defeated Lismore Thistles 0 @ Oakes Oval, Lismore	Eastwood United – John Toshack, own goal
										Final	Eastwood United 5 defeated Richmond Rovers 2 @ Oakes Oval, Lismore	Eastwood United – John Toshack (2), Dick Morrissey, own goals (2) Richmond Rovers – Alec Matthews, Dick Latta

=== 1966 – Lismore Thistles win premiership, Eastwood United win Cyril Mayo Cup with record score ===
Position	Club	Played	Won	Drew	Lost	For	Against	Points	1966 Cyril Mayo Cup	Results & venues	Goalscorers
Premiers	Lismore Thistles No 1	15	13	0	2	73	19	26	Seeded team	Lismore Thistles No 1 went straight to Semi-final stage	
2nd	Eastwood United	15	11	0	4	75	22	22	Seeded team	Eastwood United went straight to Semi-final stage	
3rd	Italo-Australian Stars	15	9	1	5	69	41	19	Quarter-final	Italo-Australian Stars 5 defeated Richmond Rovers 1 @ Oakes Oval, Lismore	Italo-Australian Stars – Ken Orr (hat-trick), W Murphy, B Gilligan Richmond Rovers – A Matthews
4th	Casino	15	4	1	10	27	89	9	Quarter-final	Casino 7 defeated Lismore Thistles No 2 3 @ Nielson Park, East Lismore	Casino – J Gelzinns (2), I Wilson (2), J Lendrigan, M Bell, L Crethar Lismore Thistles No 2 – K Theuerkauf (2), G Daley
5th	Lismore Thistles No 2	15	3	1	11	45	86	7	Semi-final	Eastwood United 5 defeated Casino 1 @ Oakes Oval, Lismore	No details available
6th	Richmond Rovers	15	3	1	11	34	66	7	Semi-final	Lismore Thistles No 1 3 defeated Italo-Australian Stars 1 @ Oakes Oval, Lismore	Lismore Thistles No 1 – Bob Smedley (hat-trick) Italo-Australian Stars – Ken Orr
									Final	Eastwood United 10 defeated Lismore Thistles No 1 2 @ Oakes Oval, Lismore	Eastwood United – Orchard (4), Matthews (hat-trick), Bob Helmood (2), Athol Parmenter Lismore Thistles No 1 – Thompson, Bob Smedley

=== 1969 – Eastwood United win 8th premiership, Italo Stars win 2nd Cyril Mayo Cup ===
Position	Club	Points	1969 Cyril Mayo Cup	Results & venues	Goalscorers
Premiers	Eastwood United	25	Semi-final	Italo Stars 6 defeated Richmond Rovers 2 after extra time (2–2 at full-time) @ Oakes Oval, Lismore	Italo Stars – Brian Lee, Gary Wagner, Unknown Richmond Rovers – Cormack (2)
2nd	Italo Stars	21	Semi-final	Lismore Thistles defeated Eastwood United on forfeit @ Oakes Oval, Lismore *	
3rd	Lismore Thistles	20	Final	Italo Stars 4 defeated Lismore Thistles 1 @ Oakes Oval, Lismore	Italo Stars – Robert Ellis (2), Gary Wagner (2) Lismore Thistles – Max Thompson
4th	Richmond Rovers	4			

* The Eastwood United team walked-off the field in the 40th minute of the first half after 3 of their players had been sent-off by the referee Jack Pressick in the 30th minute of play. At the time of the walk-off Lismore Thistles were leading 2–0.

=== 1971 – establishment of reserve grade ===
In 1970 5 teams from 4 clubs competed in Lismore District Soccer Association's senior competition; Eastwood United, Italo Stars, Lismore Thistles A, Lismore Thistles B and Richmond Rovers. In 1971 a Reserve Grade competition was established to give a surplus of senior players a game in the absence of any lower divisions or alternative clubs to the 4 existing Lismore clubs.

The inaugural Reserve Grade competition comprised 5 teams; Casino, Eastwood United, Italo Stars, Lismore Thistles B and Lismore Thistles Green. The first Reserve Grade premiers and grand final winners were Lismore Thistles B who defeated Eastwood United 6–2 in the grand final replay after the first grand final was locked at 3-all after extra time.

The final table, finals results and goalscorers for the 1971 Reserve Grade competition:

Position	Club	Played	Won	Drew	Lost	For	Against	Points	1971 Reserve Grade Finals	Results & venues	Goalscorers
Premiers	Lismore Thistles B	15	14	0	1	59	24	28	Semi-final (2nd v 4th)	Eastwood United 5 defeated Italo Stars 1 @ Oakes Oval, Lismore	Eastwood United – W McDonald (2), I Matthews, J Morrissey, L Jones Italo Stars – M Smitzer
2nd	Eastwood United	15	9	1	5	50	42	19	Semi-final (1st v 3rd)	Lismore Thistles B 4 defeated Casino 0 @ Oakes Oval, Lismore	Lismore Thistles – K Theurerkauf (2), R Lavis, W Nicholl
3rd	Casino	15	8	2	5	43	28	18	Grand final	Lismore Thistles B 3 drew with Eastwood United 3 after extra time @ Oakes Oval, Lismore	Lismore Thistles – K Theurerkauf, M Clarke, R Lavis Eastwood United – W McDonald, L James, T Mathews
4th	Italo Stars	15	8	1	6	27	25	17	Grand final Replay	Lismore Thistles B 6 defeated Eastwood United 2 @ Oakes Oval, Lismore	Lismore Thistles – Neil Burgess, M Clarke (2), Other goalscorers unknown Eastwood United – John Morrissey, Other goalscorer unknown
5th	Lismore Thistles Green	15	4	0	11	20	80	8			

=== 1970 to 1974 – Lismore Thistles win every Cyril Mayo Cup (for the grand final) ===
In 1974 Lismore Thistles created a new record by winning their 5th consecutive Cyril Mayo Cup for winning the grand final. In doing so Lismore Thistles became masters of the finals knock-out format because only once during this period did they win the premiership (in 1973). Lismore Thistles' record was equalled by Italo Stars when they won 5 consecutive Cyril Mayo Cups from 1977 to 1981.

==== 1970 season ====
Eastwood United won the 1970 premiership their 6th premiership.

Position	Club	Played	Won	Drew	Lost	For	Against	Points	1970 Finals	Results & venues	Goalscorers
Premiers	Eastwood United	14	12	1	1	66	19	25	First (Elimination) Round	Richmond Rovers 6 defeated Lismore Thistles B 4 @ Oakes Oval, Lismore	Richmond Rovers – Cormack (hat-trick), Watts, De Koster (penalty), own goal Lismore Thistles B – Ray Lavis, Reeves, Behan, own goal
2nd	Lismore Thistles A	14	11	2	1	79	12	24	Semi-final (2nd v 4th)	Lismore Thistles A 4 defeated Richmond Rovers 0 @ Oakes Oval, Lismore	Lismore Thistles A – Kel Riordan (2), Max Thompson (2)
3rd	Italo Stars	14	7	1	6	46	36	15	Semi-final (1st v 3rd)	Eastwood United 3 defeated Italo Stars 0 @ Oakes Oval, Lismore	Eastwood United – Dick Latta (2), Unknown
4th	Richmond Rovers	14	7	0	7	38	54	14	Grand final	Lismore Thistles A 5 defeated Eastwood United 1 @ Oakes Oval, Lismore	Lismore Thistles A – Kel Riordan (hat-trick), Kevin Theurerkauf, Unknown Eastwood United – Dick Morrissey
5th	Lismore Thistles B	14	3	0	11	8	88	6			
6th	Italo Stars Reserves *	14	0	0	14	0	33	0			

* Italo Stars Reserves withdrew from the competition in early-June. All games after their withdrawal have been recorded as a win for their opponent and a 0–0 scoreline.

==== 1971 season ====
Position	Club	Played	Won	Drew	Lost	For	Against	Points	1971 Finals	Results & venues	Goalscorers
Premiers	Eastwood United	15	9	3	3	55	34	21	Semi-final (2nd v 4th)	Lismore Thistles A 5 defeated Richmond Rovers 2 @ Oakes Oval, Lismore	Lismore Thistles – Terry Woods (4), Ian McDonald Richmond Rovers – Marshall Hall, own goal
2nd	Lismore Thistles A	15	8	4	3	44	30	20	Semi-final (1st v 3rd)	Eastwood United 1 versus Italo Stars 1 (1–1 at full-time) @ Oakes Oval, Lismore (1–1 at full-time) (Game abandoned due to rain and failing light during extra time)	Eastwood United – Dick Latta Italo Stars – Unknown
3rd	Italo Stars	15	8	3	4	45	29	19	Semi-final Replay (1st v 3rd)	Eastwood United defeated Italo Stars	No match details available
4th	Richmond Rovers	15	0	0	15	27	79	0	Grand final	Lismore Thistles 4 drew with Eastwood United 4 after extra time (2–2 at full-time) @ Oakes Oval, Lismore	Lismore Thistles – Terry Woods (3), Gary Thompson (penalty) Eastwood United – John Orchard (2), Dick Morrissey, Dick Latta
									Grand final 1st Replay	Lismore Thistles 1 drew with Eastwood United after extra time (1–1 at full-time) @ Oakes Oval, Lismore	Lismore Thistles – Terry Woods Eastwood United – Unknown (penalty)
									Grand final 2nd Replay	Lismore Thistles 2 defeated Eastwood United 1 @ Oakes Oval, Lismore	Lismore Thistles – Robert Ellis, Terry Woods Eastwood United – John Orchard

==== 1971 – A-Grade grand final ... "longest grand final in the history of Lismore soccer" ====
The 1971 A-Grade grand final was both history-making and constitution-changing. Under Lismore District Soccer Association rules of the time it was not possible to have joint champions (grand final winners).

The 1971 A-Grade premiers in a 4-team competition were Eastwood United by 1 point from Lismore Thistles A. The grand final was replayed twice before a winner could be found and was described as a "marathon" and the "longest grand final in the history of Lismore soccer":

- 21 August @ Oakes Oval – Lismore Thistles A 4 – Eastwood United 4 after extra time (0-all at half-time, 2-all at full-time). Goalscorers were Terry Woods (3) and Gary Thompson for Lismore Thistles and Dick Morrissey, Dick Latta and John Orchard (2) for Eastwood United.
- 28 August @ Oakes Oval – Lismore Thistles A 1 – Eastwood United 1 after extra time (Lismore Thistles led 1–0 at half-time, 1-all at full-time). Goalscorers were Terry Woods for Lismore Thistles and unknown for Eastwood United.
- 25 September @ Oakes Oval – Lismore Thistles A 2 defeated Eastwood United 1 (0-all at half-time). Goalscorers were Robert Ellis and Terry Woods for Lismore Thistles and John Orchard for Eastwood United.

The Lismore District Soccer Association committee met after the second draw (and 4 hours and 10 minutes of play) to decide whether to replay the grand final or declare Lismore Thistles A and Eastwood United joint champions. Voting was deadlocked and the then Association president, Jim Underhill used his casting vote to support a replay. As Underhill explained after the meeting, it was unconstitutional to have joint champions.

Incredibly on Saturday, 11 September (between the 1st and 2nd grand final replays) Eastwood United played Italo Stars in the final of the Ampol Silver Ball, winning 5–2. Goalscorers were John Orchard, Dick Morrissey, Dick Latta (2) and Peter Irwin for Eastwood United and Robby Pollock and John Percival for Italo Stars. Eastwood United also won the 1971 ANZAC Cup beating Lismore Thistles A 5–2 in the final. Goalscorers were Peter Keyes (2), Bob Kennedy and Jim Matthews (2) for Eastwood United and Gary Thompson and Bob Lavis for Lismore Thistles.

==== 1972 season ====
Position	Club	Played	Won	Drew	Lost	For	Against	Points	1972 Finals	Results & venues	Goalscorers
Premiers	Italo Stars	15	13	0	2	72	22	26	Quarter Final	Richmond Rovers 10 defeated South Lismore 0 @ Nielson Park, East Lismore	Richmond Rovers – R Donaldson (2), Kevin Watts (2), G Butts (2), P Morgan, A Wilson, Other goalscorers – Unknown
2nd	Eastwood United	15	11	1	3	55	37	23	Quarter Final	Lismore Thistles 2 defeated Italo Stars 1 @ Oakes Oval, Lismore	Lismore Thistles – Neil Hanna, Neil Burgess Italo Stars – Phillip Bawden
3rd	Lismore Thistles	15	10	0	5	54	37	20	Quarter Final	Eastwood United – Bye	
4th	Richmond Rovers	15	7	1	7	42	35	15	Quarter Final	Lismore Thistles Civics – Bye	
5th	South Lismore	15	1	1	13	27	73	3	Semi-final	Eastwood United 6 defeated Lismore Thistles Civics 2	Eastwood United – G Latta (hat-trick), J Orchard (hat-trick) Lismore Thistles Civics – R Winterbon, G O'Brien
6th	Lismore Thistles Civics	15	1	1	13	19	66	3	Semi-final	Lismore Thistles 5 defeated Richmond Rovers 4 @ Oakes Oval, Lismore	Lismore Thistles – Neil Hanna (hat-trick), Kel Riordan, Terry Woods Richmond Rovers – A Wilson (hat-trick), P Morgan
									Grand final	Lismore Thistles 2 defeated Eastwood United 1 @ Oakes Oval, Lismore	Lismore Thistles – Michael Clark, Terry Woods Eastwood United – Jim Matthews

==== 1972 – a year of growth ====
The 1972 season was a year of growth for the Lismore District Soccer Association with a number of new, existing and former clubs being admitted to its competitions. Total player registrations reached 1,681 (120 teams) including 1,435 juniors and 246 seniors. This compared with the Lismore-based Richmond River Junior Rugby League which had 1,250 registered junior players.

In March Richmond Rovers defeated Tumbulgum 1–0 in a women's game and is the first evidence of women's football on the Northern Rivers. A women's competition would be established by the Lismore District Soccer Association in 1974.

New clubs

- Alstonville – formed in 1972, under-8's only
- Lismore Teachers College – seniors only (Division 2)

Existing clubs

- Ballina – formed in 1971, 7 junior teams only

Former clubs

- Casino United (Division 2)
- Casino Rovers (Division 2)
- Nimbin – juniors (3 teams) and seniors (Division 2) re-admitted after some years absence

The A-Grade and Reserve Grade competitions were renamed Division 1 and Division 2 respectively. The number of Division 1 teams increased by 2 to 6 with the admission of South Lismore and Lismore Thistles fielding 2 teams and the number of Division 2 clubs increased by 5 (Casino United, Casino Rovers, Goonellabah, Lismore Teachers College and Nimbin returning after an absence of some years) to make a 10-team competition.

The Division 1 trophies were shared around:

- Eastwood United retained the ANZAC Cup after drawing 2-all with Italo Stars
- Italo Stars won their first premiership since their formation in 1966
- Lismore Thistles defeated Eastwood United 2–1 in the grand final to win their 3rd successive championship. Goalscorers were Michael Clarke and Terry Woods for Lismore Thistles and Jim Matthews for Eastwood United.

The grand final teams were:

Lismore Thistles	Position	Eastwood United
P Bartolo	Goalkeeper	I Tyler
B Lee	Right back	W Tulk
P Nott	Left back	R Ditton
T Woods	Right half	Geoff Gaggin
M Thompson	Centre half	J Coster
R Eather	Left half	S McDonough
N Hanna	Right wing	M Wilson
M Edwards	Inside right	K Orr
Kel Riordan	Centre forward	R Latta
I McDonald	Inside left	J Orchard
Neil Burgess	Left wing	J Matthews
M Clarke G Hale	Reserves	J Bird M McLean

Division 2 trophies were won by:

- premiership – Lismore Thistles Colts
- Grand final – Italo Stars defeated Eastwood United 4-1

==== 1973 – 1st Division final table and finals results ====
In 1973 Lismore Thistles won the premiership-grand final double; their 5th premiership and 5th Cyril Mayo Cup after entering senior competitions in 1958. 1973 was their 4th Cyril Mayo Cup (grand final) victory in a row.

Lismore Thistles won the premiership easily from Italo Stars, who were at least 7 points behind. It's unclear the final margin as Italo Stars-Eastwood United's last fixture of the season was forfeited, but it's unclear which club forfeited.

Lismore Thistles lost just once (to Italo Stars 3–0) and drew three times (Richmond Rovers 3-3, Eastwood United 1-1 and 2-2) during the 1973 season:

Position	Club	Played	Won	Drew	Lost	For	Against	Points	1973 Finals	Results & venues	Goalscorers
Premiers	Lismore Thistles	17	13	3	1	64	30	29	Semi-final	Lismore Thistles 5 defeated Italo Stars 1 @ Oakes Oval, Lismore	Lismore Thistles – Terry Woods (2 including a penalty), Neil Hanna, Ross Winterbon, Neil Burgess Italo Stars – Kevin Watts
2nd	Italo Stars*	17	10	0	6	72	46	20	Semi-final	Eastwood United 4 defeated Richmond Rovers 2 @ Nielson Park, East Lismore	Eastwood United – John Orchard (2), Geoff Gaggin, G Latta Richmond Rovers – S Harris, A Wilson
3rd	Eastwood United*	17	6	2	8	57	50	14	Grand final	Lismore Thistles 2 defeated Eastwood United 1 @ Oakes Oval, Lismore	Lismore Thistles – Neil Hanna, Terry Woods Eastwood United – Mark Wilson
4th	Richmond Rovers	17	1	1	15	41	108	3			

* The Italo Stars-Eastwood United fixture scheduled to be played 1 September was forfeited, but it's unclear which club forfeited.

==== 1974 finals results ====
1974 Finals	Results & venues	Goalscorers
Semi-final	Lismore Thistles 2 defeated Eastwood United 1 @ Oakes Oval, Lismore	Lismore Thistles – Philip Geary, Ian McDonald Eastwood United – R Kennedy
Semi-final	Italo Stars 2 defeated Richmond Rovers 1 @ Oakes Oval, Lismore	Italo Stars – Graham Eather, Phillip Parkes Richmond Rovers – Armin Sandmann
Grand final	Lismore Thistles 4 defeated Italo Stars 0 @ Oakes Oval, Lismore	Lismore Thistles – Neil Burgess, Terry Woods (penalty), Michael Clarke, Ross Winterbon

=== 1972 – visit by Dundee FC ===
In May 1972 Dundee FC toured Australia and New Zealand. On that tour they played Australia in Adelaide (Dundee FC won 2–1), NSW (Dundee FC won 6–1) and Queensland (Dundee FC won 9–0).

Dundee FC played a Northern Rivers representative side at Oakes Oval, Lismore on Wednesday night 24 May 1972. A crowd of more than 4,000 saw Dundee FC beat the locals 16–1 (8–0 at half-time). Some of the adjectives used to describe Dundee FC's performance were "world class" and "incredible". Goal scorers for Dundee FC were Jocky Scott (5), John Gray (3), John Duncan (2), Ian Scott, Bobby Wilson, Duncan Lambie, Doug Houston, Gordon Wallace and George Stewart. The Northern Rivers goal was scored by Gordon Bryant near full-time. Two awards were made to Northern Rivers players after the game – Dick Latta (Lismore Sports & Toy Centre award) and Phillip Bawden (All-Round Sports Centre (Sydney) award).

The Northern Rivers squad for this game was:

- Goalkeeper – Trevor Rainbow (Grafton)
- Fullbacks – John Percival (Captain, Italo Stars, Lismore), Peter Nott (Lismore Thistles), Robbie Donaldson (Richmond Rovers, Lismore)
- Halfbacks – Max Thompson (Lismore Thistles), Terry Woods (Lismore Thistles), Gordon Bryant (Italo Stars, Lismore), Allan Hampton (Grafton)
- Forwards – Devinder Singh (Grafton, although living at Woolgoolga), John Orchard (Eastwood United, Lismore), Dick Morrissey (Eastwood United, Lismore), Phillip Bawden (Italo Stars, Lismore), Dick Latta (Eastwood United, Lismore)
- Coach – Armin Sandmann (Lismore)

Two players were forced to withdraw from the squad in the week leading up to the game due to injury; Ian Monaghan and Kevin Lollback.

Jack Pressick, Secretary of the Northern Rivers Soccer Federation, was the driving force in arranging this game. Pressick, having noted that Dundee FC's itinerary had one unconfirmed date and venue, contacted the Australian Soccer Federation and suggested a match at Lismore. Pressick's suggestion was wholeheartedly supported provided Dundee FC's asking price of $4,500 could be guaranteed. Pressick and Jim Underhill, President of the Lismore District Soccer Association raised the funds from local businesses and businessmen.

=== 1974 – women's football arrives ===
In May 1974 the Lismore District Soccer Association approved its first women's competition. Six teams nominated including:

- Lismore Thistles
- College of Advanced Education (CAE)/Teacher's College
- Lismore High School
- St Vincent's Hospital

The historic first game in a 10-game season was played on Saturday, 25 May 1974 at Richmond River High School with CAE/Teacher's College beating Lismore Thistles 3–0. Goalscorers for CAE/Teacher's College were D Allen, L Worland and G Schubert.

=== 1977 to 1981 – Italo Stars win every Cyril Mayo Cup (for the grand final) ===
From 1977 to 1981 Italo Stars won every Cyril Mayo Cup (for winning the grand final) and in doing so equalled Lismore Thistles record of 5 successive Cyril Mayo Cups (from 1970 to 1974). During this 5-year period Italo Stars also won every ANZAC Cup and 2 premierships in 1977 and 1978:

- Treble (ANZAC Cup, premiership, Cyril Mayo Cup (for the grand final)) – 2 in 1977 and 1978
- Cup double (ANZAC Cup, Cyril Mayo Cup) – 5 in 1977, 1978, 1979, 1980, and 1981
- premiership–grand final double – 2 in 1977 and 1978

==== 1977 – 1st & 2nd Division final table ====
Position	Club	Played	Won	Drew	Lost	For	Against	Points	1977 Finals	Results & venues	Goalscorers
1st Division Premiers	Italo Stars (Undefeated)	21	19	2	0	118	11	40	Minor semi-final (2nd v 4th)	Lismore Thistles 4 defeated Richmond Rovers (1) 1 @ Oakes Oval, Lismore	Lismore Thistles – Terry Woods, Tony Roder, Ian McDonald, Unknown Richmond Rovers (1) – South
1st Division 2nd	Lismore Thistles	20	16	2	2	95	19	34	Major semi-final (1st v 3rd)	Italo Stars 2 defeated Eastwood United 1 @ Oakes Oval, Lismore	Italo Stars – Mike Stevens, Gary Northcote Eastwood United – Binna Pollard
1st Division 3rd	Eastwood United	20	15	3	2	79	31	33	Grand final	Italo Stars 3 defeated Lismore Thistles 2 after extra time (2–2 at full-time) @ Oakes Oval, Lismore	Italo Stars – Greg Sharpe, Peter Wiblen (2) Lismore Thistles – Terry Woods, Ian McDonald
1st Division 4th	Richmond Rovers (1)	21	10	4	7	65	55	24			
1st Division 5th	Lismore Thistles Civics	21	11	1	9	64	53	23			
2nd Division Premiers	Ballina	21	9	5	7	52	50	23			
2nd Division 2nd	Eastwood City	21	8	2	11	59	86	18			
2nd Division 3rd	Italo Hotspurs	21	8	1	12	44	80	17			
2nd Division 4th	Nimbin	21	7	0	14	34	66	14			
2nd Division 5th	Lismore Thistles United	21	4	1	16	43	92	9			
2nd Division 6th	Northern Rivers College of Advanced Education	21	3	2	16	21	75	8			
2nd Division 7th	Richmond Rovers (2)	21	2	3	16	38	94	7			

==== 1978 – 1st Division final table ====
Position	Club	Played	Won	Drew	Lost	For	Against	Points	1978 Cyril Mayo Knock-out Cup	Results & venues	Goalscorers
Premiers	Italo Stars	15	10	2	3	44	27	22	Quarter-final	Richmond Rovers 4 defeated Ballina 0 @ Saunders Oval, Ballina	Richmond Rovers – Unknown
2nd	Lismore Thistles	14	8	3	3	38	12	19	Quarter-final	Lismore Thistles 1 defeated Goonellabah 0 @ Oakes Oval, Lismore	Lismore Thistles – Jeff Edwards
3rd	Goonellabah	15	8	3	4	25	24	19	Quarter-final	Italo Stars – Bye	
4th	Eastwood United	14	7	4	3	54	27	18	Quarter-final	Eastwood United – Bye	
5th	Richmond Rovers	15	4	2	9	28	36	10	Semi-final	Lismore Thistles 4 defeated Richmond Rovers 1 @ Oakes Oval, Lismore	Lismore Thistles – Phillip Hicks (2), Burgess, Jeff Edwards Richmond Rovers – Brendan Buckett
6th	Ballina	15	0	0	15	14	77	0	Semi-final	Italo Stars 3 defeated Eastwood United 1 @ Oakes Oval, Lismore	Italo Stars – Russell Storti (2), Garry Northcote Eastwood United – Andy Stevens (penalty)
									Grand final	Italo Stars 2 defeated Lismore Thistles 1 @ Oakes Oval, Lismore	Italo Stars – Greg Sharpe, Russell Storti Lismore Thistles – Terry Woods (penalty)

==== 1979 – 1st Division final table & Cyril Mayo Knock-out Cup results ====
Position	Club	Points	1979 Cyril Mayo Knock-out Cup	Results & venues	Goalscorers
Premiers	Eastwood United	36	Quarter-final	Clarence Valley 3 defeated Richmond Rovers 2 @ Nielson Park, East Lismore	Clarence Valley – Micky Miner, Greg Pullen (2) Richmond Rovers – Paul Aitken (penalty), Stuart Harris
2nd	Italo Stars	33	Quarter-final	Goonellabah 1 defeated South Lismore 1 on penalties (4–2) after full-time @ Oakes Oval, Lismore	Goonellabah – Ian McDonald South Lismore – Noel Field
3rd	Goonellabah	33	Quarter-final	Italo Stars 2 defeated Eastwood United 0 @ Oakes Oval, Lismore	Italo Stars – Russell Storti, Ken McPherson
4th	Lismore Thistles	22	Quarter-final	Lismore Thistles – Bye	
5th	Richmond Rovers	18	Semi-final	Clarence Valley 2 defeated Goonellabah 1 @ Weston Park, Goonellabah	Clarence Valley – Tony Blanch, own goal Goonellabah – Peter Warren
6th	South Lismore	14	Semi-final	Italo Stars 4 defeated Lismore Thistles 3 @ Oakes Oval, Lismore	Italo Stars – Rod Dargie, Russell Storti (hat-trick) Lismore Thistles – Murray Edwards (penalty), Jeff Edwards (2)
7th	Clarence Valley	10	Final	Italo Stars defeated Clarence Valley @ Oakes Oval, Lismore	No details available

=== 1980 – Lismore plays Wellington (New Zealand) ===
In September 1980 a Lismore side played Wellington (New Zealand) at Oakes Oval. The Wellington side included 4 New Zealand internationals; Barry Pickering (goalkeeper who made the New Zealand squad for the 1982 World Cup in Spain), Keith Barton (defender), Jeff Strom (defender) and Michael Simeonoff (midfielder). The weekend before the Lismore game, Wellington beat Clarence Valley 5–0 in Grafton before a crowd of 300. Wellington defeated Lismore 4–0, the goalscorers being Paul Vanderbreggen and Costa Leonadis (hat-trick).

The Lismore squad and officials for the game were:

Player	Position	Club
Craig Hamshaw	Goalkeeper	Italo Stars
Peter Harris	Goalkeeper	Goonellabah
Gil Bryen	Back	Italo Stars
Greg Sharpe	Back	Italo Stars
Ross Winterbon	Back	Eastwood United
Bruce Harris	Back	Eastwood United
Noel Fields	Midfielder	South Lismore
Murray Edwards	Midfielder	Eastwood United
Michael Riley	Midfielder	Eastwood United
Rob Stevens	Forward	Richmond Rovers
Peter Wiblen	Forward	Eastwood United
Brendan Buckett	Forward	Lismore Thistles
Tony Perkins	Forward	Italo Stars
Andy Anderson	Forward	Italo Stars
Keith Harris	Team manager	

1980 Cyril Mayo Cup	Results & venues	Goalscorers
Quarter-final	Lismore Thistles 7 defeated Ballina 0 @ Thistles Park, East Lismore	
Quarter-final	Italo Stars 2 defeated South Lismore 0 @ Oakes Oval, Lismore	
Quarter-final	Richmond Rovers 10 defeated Clarence Valley 0 @	
Quarter-final	Eastwood United 6 defeated Goonellabah 0 @ Oakes Oval, Lismore	
Semi-final	Italo Stars 6 defeated Richmond Rovers 1 @ Oakes Oval, Lismore	
Semi-final	Lismore Thistles 2 defeated Eastwood United 0 @ Oakes Oval, Lismore	
Final	Italo Stars 1 defeated Lismore Thistles 0 @ Oakes Oval, Lismore	

=== 1981 – Eastwood United premiership, Italo Stars Cyril Mayo Cup ===
1981 Cyril Mayo Cup	Results & venues	Goalscorers
Minor semi-final (3rd v 4th)	Richmond Rovers 4 defeated Lismore Thistles 2 after extra time (2–2 at full-time) @ Oakes Oval, Lismore	Richmond Rovers – Steven Campbell (2), Neil Burgess, Ian Brown Lismore Thistles – Jeff Edwards (2)
Major semi-final (1st v 2nd)	Eastwood United 1 defeated Italo Stars 0 @ Oakes Oval, Lismore	Eastwood United – David Burgess
Preliminary final	Italo Stars 3 defeated Richmond Rovers 0 @ Oakes Oval, Lismore	Italo Stars – Russell Storti (2), own goal
Grand final	Italo Stars 2 defeated Eastwood United 0 @ Oakes Oval, Lismore	Italo Stars – Ron Forder, Kevin Wilson

=== 1982 – Eastwood United win premiership & Ballina make finals for first time ===
Position	Club	Played	Won	Drew	Lost	For	Against	Points	1982 Cyril Mayo Cup	Results & venues	Goalscorers
Premiers	Eastwood United	21	17	2	2	56	16	53	Minor semi-final (3rd v 4th)	Ballina 1 defeated Richmond Rovers 0 after extra time (0–0 at full-time) @ Oakes Oval, Lismore	Ballina – Peter Leeson
2nd	Lismore Thistles	21	10	10	1	36	20	40	Major semi-final (1st v 2nd)	Lismore Thistles 1 defeated Eastwood United 0 after extra time (0–0 at full-time) @ Oakes Oval, Lismore	Lismore Thistles – Jeff Edwards
3rd	Richmond Rovers	21	11	2	8	43	29	35	Preliminary final	Eastwood United 2 defeated Ballina 0 @ Oakes Oval, Lismore	Eastwood United – John Wraights (2)
4th	Ballina	21	10	3	8	38	39	33	Grand final	Lismore Thistles defeated Eastwood United on penalties (4–3) (0–0 after extra time, 0–0 at full-time) @ Oakes Oval, Lismore	
5th	Italo Stars	21	9	3	9	37	34	30			
6th	Alstonvilla	21	7	2	12	27	42	23			
7th	Goonellabah	21	4	3	14	32	46	15			
8th	South Lismore	21	2	3	16	20	54	9			

=== 1983 – Goonellabah wins their first premiership & ANZAC Cup ===
After being formed as a junior club in 1969, Goonellabah first entered a senior team in the 1972 Division 2 competition, coming 2nd last. In 1982 they came 2nd last in First Division. 1983 would be a break-out year as they won the ANZAC Cup and 1st Division premiership for the first time with virtually the same team as 1982.

In April Goonellabah won their first ANZAC Cup 1–0 against Eastwood United with Robert Pearce scoring with full-time looming.

The 1983 premiership was a season-long race between Goonellabah and the defending premiers Eastwood United. Going into the final round the Armin Sandmann coached Goonellabah led by 2 points needing a win against 3rd-placed Lismore Thistles to be certain of their first premiership. Goonellabah won 1-0 (goalscorer – Andy Acton) making Eastwood United's 9–1 thrashing of South Lismore inconsequential.

Eastwood United had revenge when they defeated Goonellabah 3–0 in the major semi-final, the goalscorers being John Wraights, Ken McPherson and Dennis Wiblen. Goonellabah's season came to an end when beaten 1–0 by Lismore Thistles in the preliminary final, the goalscorer being Neil Harris. The Jack Jarvis coached Eastwood United won their 8th grand final defeating Lismore Thistles 2–0 at a windy Oakes Oval, the goalscorers being Darren Laycock and John Wraights.

Position	Club	Played	Won	Drawn	Lost	For	Against	Goal difference	Points	1983 Cyril Mayo Cup	Results & venues	Goalscorers
Premiers	Goonellabah	16	14	1	1	39	14	+ 25	43	Minor semi-final (3rd v 4th)	Lismore Thistles 5 defeated Italo Stars 1 @ Thistles Park, East Lismore	Lismore Thistles – Mick Riley (2), Tony Roder, Jeff Edwards, Neil Harris Italo Stars – Unknown
2nd	Eastwood United	16	13	2	1	53	7	+ 46	41	Major semi-final (1st v 2nd)	Eastwood United 3 defeated Goonellabah 0 @ Oakes Oval, Lismore	Eastwood United – John Wraights, Ken McPherson, Dennis Wiblen
3rd	Lismore Thistles	16	11	2	3	41	18	+ 23	35	Preliminary final	Lismore Thistles 1 defeated Goonallabah 0 @ Oakes Oval, Lismore	Lismore Thistles – Neil Harris
4th	Italo Stars	16	7	5	4	34	27	+ 7	26	Grand final	Eastwood United 2 defeated Lismore Thistles 0 @ Oakes Oval, Lismore	Eastwood United – Darren Laycock, John Wraights
5th	Ballina	16	6	2	8	31	27	+ 4	20			
6th	Richmond Rovers	16	6	0	10	21	31	– 10	18			
7th	Alstonvilla	16	5	2	9	21	30	– 9	17			
8th	South Lismore	16	1	2	13	20	51	– 31	5			
9th	Northern Rivers College of Advanced Education	16	1	0	15	9	64	– 55	3			

=== 1984 – a year of change ===
1984 was a year of change with the Lismore District Soccer Association and its committees being replaced by a company, Lismore & District Soccer Pty Ltd and elected board members with responsibility for administering soccer in the Lismore region. In addition two Lismore-based clubs, Italo Stars and South Lismore merged to create a new club, Souths Stars United. Souths Stars United had immediate success, winning the 1984 ANZAC Cup and First Division premiership.

In the ANZAC Cup Souths Stars United defeated Eastwood United 2–1 at Oakes Oval in front of 400 fans and after almost 2 hours of play. Midway through the first half Souths Stars United's Brett Towner pounced on a defensive mix-up to give Souths Stars a 1-0 half-time lead. Eastwood United equalised late in the second half thanks to a Ken McPherson penalty, making it 1-all at full-time. In the first period of extra-time Kevin Wilson headed home the winner to clinch the trophy. Man of the match, selected by referee Dean Mohammed and linesmen Dick Morrissey and Ted Cavanagh, was Brett Towner of Souths Stars United.

The First Division premiership was a two-club race between Souths Stars United and Eastwood United with Souths Stars taking out the trophy by 3 points:

Position	Club	Played	Won	Drew	Lost	For	Against	Points	1984 Finals	Results & venues	Goalscorers
Premiers	Souths Stars United	18	15	1	2	54	11	46	First Round	Souths Stars United 3 defeated Lismore Thistles 1 @ Lismore Italo-Australian Sports & Recreation Club, Barrow Lane, Lismore	Souths Stars – Greg Sharpe, Brett Towner, own goal Lismore Thistles – Jeff Edwards
2nd	Eastwood United	18	14	1	3	49	18	43	First Round	Eastwood United 1 defeated Goonellabah 0 @ Oakes Oval	Eastwood United – Ken McPherson
3rd	Lismore Thistles	18	9	3	6	37	23	30	Second Round	Souths Stars United 10 defeated Goonellabah 1 @ Weston Park, Goonellabah	Souths Stars United – Kevin Wilson (4), Brett Towner (4), Chris McPherson (2) Goonellabah – Unknown
4th	Goonellabah	18	8	3	7	33	34	27	Second Round	Eastwood United 2 defeated Lismore Thistles 0 @ Oakes Oval	Eastwood United – Wayne Ianna, Dave Condon
5th	Richmond Rovers	18	7	4	7	26	28	25	Finals Points	Souths Stars United – 6 points (13 goals for – 2 goals against) Eastwood United – 6 points (3–0) Lismore Thistles – 0 points (1–5) Goonellabah – 0 points (1–11)	
6th	Ballina	18	8	1	9	30	35	25	Grand final	Eastwood United won on penalties against Souths Stars United (3–3 after extra-time, 2–2 at full-time)	Eastwood United – Ken McPherson (2), Dave Condon Souths Stars United – Hugh Naisby, Peter Jensen, Wayne Storti
7th	Casino	18	5	3	10	19	33	18			
8th	Alstonvilla	18	5	3	10	19	33	18			
9th	Mullumbimby	18	4	1	13	22	51	13			
10th	Bangalow	18	3	3	12	18	42	12			

=== 1985 – Eastwood United becomes Lismore Workers ===
During the 1985 season Eastwood United became a member of the Lismore Workers Club Sports Trust and from 1 June their senior teams were re-badged as Lismore Workers Soccer Club. To avoid confusion Eastwood United's 10 junior teams retained the Eastwood United name until the 1986 season. Eastwood United joined 18 other sporting clubs including the rugby league club in joining the Lismore Workers Sports Trust.

Lismore Workers Soccer Club retained the same executive as that previously elected at its annual general meeting:

- President – Andy Stevens
- Vice-president – Rod Thomas
- Secretary – Glen Hart
- Treasurer – Janice Ianna

==== 1985 Premier Division final table ====
Position	Club	Points
Premiers	Lismore Thistles (Undefeated)	52
2nd	Lismore Workers	41
3rd	Mullumbimby	36
4th	South Stars	32
5th	Casino	24
6th	Richmond Rovers	20
7th	Bangalow	13
8th	Alstonvilla	10
9th	Goonellabah	12
10th	Ballina	6

Eastwood United were defending champions having beaten Souths Stars United on penalties after extra time (2-all at full-time and 3-all after extra time) in the 1984 grand final. Goalscorers in the 1984 grand final were Ken McPherson (2) and Dave Condon for Eastwood United and Hugh Naisby, Peter Jenson and Wayne Storti for Souths Stars United. However, in 1985 Lismore Workers came second to undefeated premiers Lismore Thistles and made the grand final against Lismore Thistles after a new and confusing finals format in which the top 6 teams played 4 semi-final rounds.

In the Lismore Real Estate Premier Division grand final Lismore Thistles completed the 1985 season undefeated and won their 9th championship, beating Lismore Workers 1–0 with a first half goal by Tony Roder.

=== 1986 – Richmond Rovers celebrate 25 years with a premiership–championship double ===
In 1986 Richmond Rovers celebrated 25 years. To add to the celebrations they won the 1986 Premier Division (the Lismore Real Estate Premier Division) premiership and grand final. These were their 2nd premiership (the first was in 1975) and 3rd championship (previous championships were in 1964 and 1975).

Richmond Rovers was established by Bill Harris in 1961 and in their first season fielded 3 teams; a senior men's team and 2 junior teams. By 1986 Richmond Rovers had grown to 22 teams; 5 men's teams, 2 women's teams and 15 junior teams.

Richmond Rovers comfortably won the 10-team premiership by 7 points from a logjam of teams equal on 33 points and only separated by goal difference including Maclean, Lismore Thistles and Alstonvilla:

Position	Club	Played	Won	Drew	Lost	For	Against	Goal difference	Points	1986 Finals	Results & venues	Goalscorers
Premiers	Richmond Rovers	18	12	4	2	46	21	+25	40	Elimination Semi-final (4th v 5th)	Mullumbimby 2 defeated Alstonvilla 0 @ Nielson Park, East Lismore	Mullumbimby – Unknown
2nd	Maclean	18	10	3	5	57	26	+31	33	Qualifying Semi-final (2nd v 3rd)	Lismore Thistles 3 defeated Maclean 2 after extra time (2–2 at full-time) @ Oakes Oval, Lismore	Lismore Thistles – Phillip Hicks, Steve Morrissey, Graeme Prior Maclean – Gary Northcote (2)
3rd	Lismore Thistles	18	9	6	3	42	20	+22	33	Minor semi-final	Mullumbimby 2 defeated Maclean 1 after extra time (1–1 at full-time) @ Nielson Park, East Lismore	Mullumbimby – Peter Bywater, Unknown Maclean – Unknown
4th	Alstonvilla	18	10	3	5	40	34	+6	33	Major semi-final	Lismore Thistles 3 defeated Richmond Rovers 0 @ Oakes Oval, Lismore	Lismore Thistles – Phillip Hicks, Steve Morrissey, Mick Riley
5th	Mullumbimby	18	8	8	2	36	25	+11	32	Preliminary final	Richmond Rovers 2 defeated Mullumbimby 1 after extra time (1–1 at full-time) @ Oakes Oval, Lismore	Richmond Rovers – Stephen Bugden, Ian Brown Mullumbimby – Sulcs
6th	Bangalow	18	7	8	3	31	19	+12	29	Grand final	Richmond Rovers 2 defeated Lismore Thistles 1 after extra time (1–1 at full-time) @ Oakes Oval, Lismore	Richmond Rovers – Ian Brown, John Bugden Lismore Thistles – Steve Morrissey
7th	Ballina	18	6	1	11	25	46	-21	19			
8th	Goonellabah	18	3	4	11	27	46	-19	13			
9th	Italo Stars	18	3	3	12	23	54	-31	12			
10th	Lismore Workers	18	2	0	16	10	46	-36	6			

Richmond Rovers took the hard route to the grand final, being beaten 3–0 in the major semi-final by Lismore Thistles at Oakes Oval (Goalscorers – Phillip Hicks, Steve Morrissey, Mick Riley) before overcoming Mullumbimby 2–1 after extra time in the preliminary final. Mullumbimby scored in the 1st half with a goal by Sulcs and led until deep into the 2nd half before a late Stephen Bugden goal forced the game into extra time. Ian Brown scored Richmond Rovers winner in extra time to give them a grand final berth against Lismore Thistles at Oakes Oval.

The grand final at Oakes Oval was deadlocked 1-all at full-time after first half goals from an Ian Brown header for Richmond Rovers and a Steve Morrissey equaliser for Lismore Thistles. In extra time Richmond Rovers' captain John Bugden hammered home the winner for a perfect finale to their 25th anniversary celebrations.

The squads and coaches for the grand final were:

Richmond Rovers	Lismore Thistles
John Bugden (Captain)	Graeme Prior (Captain)
Peter Montgomery	John Noble (Goalkeeper)
Ian Brown	Scott Gilmore
Jamie Maher	Terry Dwyer
Darren Maher	Mick Gooley
Robert Armbruster	Richard Nind
Stephen Bugden	Leo Rossitto
Craig Kennedy (Goalkeeper)	Jeff Edwards
Noel Field	Phillip Hicks
Tony Perkins	Mick Riley
Craig Hamshaw	Steve Morrissey
Wally Edwards	Craig Watson
Phillip Darragh	Neil Harris
Peter Wappett	Rodney Lees
Brian Bugden (Coach)	Darryl Riley
	Martin Scott
	Mark Riley (Coach)

=== 1987 – Lismore Thistles win premiership, Richmond Rovers win Cyril Mayo Cup ===
Position	Club	Played	Won	Drew	Lost	For	Against	Points	1987 Cyril Mayo Cup	Results & venues	Goalscorers
Premiers	Lismore Thistles	14	10	1	3	49	16	31	Elimination preliminary final (4th v 5th)	Bangalow 1 defeated Alstonvilla 0 @ Saunders Oval, Ballina	Bangalow – Robert Parkes (penalty)
2nd	Ballina	14	7	5	2	33	21	26 (+12)	Major preliminary final (2nd v 3rd)	Richmond Rovers 1 defeated Ballina 0 @ Oakes Oval, Lismore	Richmond Rovers – Darren Maher
3rd	Richmond Rovers	14	8	2	4	21	18	26 (+3)	Minor semi-final	Bangalow 2 defeated Ballina 0 @ Crawford Oval, Alstonville	Bangalow – Paul Clarke (2)
4th	Bangalow	14	6	4	4	35	20	22 (+15)	Major semi-final	Richmond Rovers defeated Lismore Thistles 4–3 on penalties (2–2 after extra time) @ Oakes Oval, Lismore	Richmond Rovers – Peter Wappett, Craig Hamshaw Lismore Thistles – Jeff Edwards, Peter Morrissey
5th	Alstonvilla	14	6	4	4	24	20	22 (+4)	Preliminary final	Bangalow 1 defeated Lismore Thistles 0 @ Oakes Oval, Lismore	Bangalow – Robert Parkes (penalty)
6th	Maclean	14	6	0	8	38	38	18	Grand final	Richmond Rovers 4 defeated Bangalow 1 @ Oakes Oval, Lismore	Richmond Rovers – Noel Fields (2), Peter Wappett, Stephen Bugden Bangalow – Lyle Wheeler
7th	Brunswick Heads	14	2	1	11	10	47	7			
8th	Italo Stars	14	0	5	9	7	35	5			

=== 1988 – Italo Stars win premiership–Cyril Mayo Cup double ===
Position	Club	Played	Won	Drew	Lost	For	Against	Goal difference	Points	1988 Cyril Mayo Cup	Results & venues	Goalscorers
Premiers	Italo Stars	22	17	2	3	54	17	+37	53	Elimination preliminary final (4th v 5th)	Lismore Workers 2 defeated Goonellabah 0 @ Oakes Oval, Lismore	Lismore Workers – Ken McPherson (2)
2nd	Lismore Thistles	22	15	3	4	37	18	+19	48	Major preliminary final (2nd v 3rd)	Lismore Thistles 3 defeated South Lismore 2 after extra time (2–2 at full-time) @ Oakes Oval, Lismore	Lismore Thistles – Steve Morrissey, Jeff Edwards, Mick Gooley South Lismore – Terry Dwyer, Mark Goodall
3rd	South Lismore	22	15	1	6	53	24	+29	46	Minor semi-final	South Lismore 3 defeated Lismore Workers 2 @ Oakes Oval, Lismore	South Lismore – Dave Prosser, Geoff Marshall, Darryl Gray Lismore Workers – Andrew Pierce, Penalty (unknown)
4th	Lismore Workers	21*	13	4	4	57	16	+41	43	Major semi-final	Lismore Thistles 1 defeated Italo Stars 0 @ Oakes Oval, Lismore	Lismore Thistles – Philip Hicks
5th	Goonellabah	22	12	1	9	37	41	-4	37	Preliminary final	Italo Stars 3 defeated South Lismore 1 @ Oakes Oval, Lismore	Italo Stars – Chris McPherson, Steven Fredericks, own goal South Lismore – Rodney Hyde (penalty)
6th	Ballina	22	9	2	11	30	40	-10	29	Grand final	Italo Stars defeated Lismore Thistles 7–6 on penalties (1–1 at full-time, 1–1 after extra time) @ Oakes Oval, Lismore	Italo Stars – Steven Fredericks Lismore Thistles – Unknown
7th	Grafton	21*	8	3	10	30	42	-12	27			
8th	Casino	22	7	5	10	39	42	-3	26			
9th	Richmond Rovers	22	5	9	8	21	29	-8	24			
10th	Alstonvilla	22	7	2	13	27	55	-28	23			
11th	Bangalow	22	3	5	14	27	48	-21	14			
12th	Brunswick Valley	22	1	1	20	16	56	-40	4			

* The final game of the season, a deferred game between Lismore Workers and Grafton wasn't played by mutual agreement

=== 1989 – Lismore Workers win premiership–Cyril Mayo Cup double ===
Position	Club	Played	Won	Drew	Lost	For	Against	Goal difference	Points	1989 Cyril Mayo Cup	Results & venues	Goalscorers
Premiers	Lismore Workers (Undefeated)	18	12	6	0	36	13	+23	42	Knock-out Semi-final (4th v 5th)	Lismore Thistles 2 defeated Ballina 0 @ Nielson Park, East Lismore	Lismore Thistles – Gerald Pollard, Mick Gooley
2nd	Italo Stars	18	10	4	4	30	12	+18	34	Major semi-final (2nd v 3rd)	Italo Stars 3 defeated Casino 0 @ Oakes Oval, Lismore	Italo Stars – Unknown
3rd	Casino	18	9	5	4	38	16	+22	32	Minor semi-final	Casino 2 defeated Lismore Thistles 1 @ Weston Park, Goonellabah	Casino – Unknown Lismore Thistles – Unknown
4th	Lismore Thistles	18	8	7	3	30	13	+17	31	Major semi-final	Italo Stars 2 defeated Lismore Workers 1 @ Oakes Oval, Lismore	Italo Stars – Kevin Wilson, Norm Snow Lismore Workers – Peter Wiblen
5th	Ballina	18	8	5	5	37	30	+7	29	Preliminary final	Lismore Workers defeated Casino 5–3 on penalties (1–1 at full-time, 1–1 after extra time) @ Oakes Oval, Lismore	Lismore Workers – John Wraight Casino – Unknown
6th	Richmond Rovers	18	7	5	6	24	23	+1	26	Grand final	Lismore Workers defeated Italo Stars 4–3 on penalties (1–1 at full-time, 1–1 after extra time) @ Oakes Oval, Lismore	Lismore Workers – John Wraight Italo Stars – Anthony Gaggin
7th	South Lismore	18	4	6	8	19	30	-11	18			
8th	Grafton	18	4	3	11	17	32	-15	15			
9th	Goonellabah	18	3	3	12	19	48	-29	12			
10th	Alstonville	18	1	4	13	17	50	-33	7			

=== 1990 – Lismore Workers win 2nd successive premiership–Cyril Mayo Cup double ===
Position	Club	Played	Won	Drew	Lost	For	Against	Goal difference	Points	1990 Cyril Mayo Cup	Results & venues	Goalscorers
Premiers	Lismore Workers	18	12	2	4	37	21	+16	38	5th Place Play-off (5th v 6th)	South Lismore 1 defeated Richmond Rovers 0 @ Thistles Park, East Lismore	South Lismore – Unknown
2nd	Italo Stars	18	11	3	4	42	18	+24	36	Sudden Death Semi-final (4th v 5th)	Lismore Thistles 2 defeated South Lismore 0 @ Nesbitt Park, Goonellabah	Lismore Thistles – James Hay, Doug Boardman
3rd	Casino	18	10	4	4	27	23	+4	34	Major semi-final (2nd v 3rd)	Italo Stars 1 defeated Casino 0 @ Weston Park, Goonellabah	Italo Stars – Jason Thatcher
4th	Lismore Thistles	18	9	5	4	33	15	+18	32	Minor semi-final	Casino 3 defeated Lismore Thistles 1 @ Weston Park, Goonellabah	Casino – Gary Smith (2), Dennis Westerman Lismore Thistles – Glen Harley
5th	South Lismore	18	7	7	4	27	22	+5	28	Major semi-final	Lismore Workers 2 defeated Italo Stars 0 @ Thistles Park, East Lismore	Lismore Workers – Andrew Pierce, Wayne Ianna
6th	Richmond Rovers	18	8	4	6	25	23	+2	28	Preliminary final	Italo Stars 2 defeated Casino 0 @ Nielson Park, East Lismore	Italo Stars – Gary Underhill (penalty), Jason Thatcher
7th	Ballina	18	6	3	9	23	35	-12	21	Grand final	Lismore Workers 1 defeated Italo Stars 0 @ Weston Park, Goonellabah	Lismore Workers – Andy Thomas
8th	Byron Bay	18	3	4	11	24	34	-10	13			
9th	Goonellabah	18	2	5	11	17	39	-22	11			
10th	Grafton	18	3	1	14	13	38	-25	10			

=== 1991 – Lismore Thistles win premiership; history made as Cyril Mayo Cup shared by Lismore Thistles & Richmond Rovers ===
Position	Club	Played	Won	Drew	Lost	For	Against	Goal difference	Points	1991 Cyril Mayo Cup	Results & venues	Goalscorers
Premiers	Lismore Thistles	18	13	4	1	45	12	+33	43	5th Place Play-off (5th v 6th)	Richmond Rovers 3 defeated South Lismore 1 @ Oakes Oval, Lismore	Richmond Rovers – Brendan Matthews (penalty), Jack Bugden, Chris Matthews South Lismore – Troy Percival
2nd	Lismore Workers	18	12	4	2	47	12	+35	40	Minor Preliminary Semi-final (4th v 5th)	Richmond Rovers defeated Italo Stars 5–4 on penalties (0–0 at full-time, 0–0 after extra time) @ Thistles Park, East Lismore	
3rd	Casino	18	11	6	1	33	12	+21	39	Major Preliminary Semi-final (2nd v 3rd)	Lismore Workers 1 defeated Casino 0 @ Oakes Oval, Lismore	Lismore Workers – Paul Wiltshire
4th	Italo Stars	18	7	6	5	33	24	+9	27	Minor semi-final	Richmond Rovers 2 defeated Casino 1 after extra time (1–1 at full-time) @ Weston Park, Goonellabah	Richmond Rovers – Chris Matthews (2) Casino – Shane Battistuzzi
5th	South Lismore	18	7	3	8	24	27	-3	24	Major semi-final	Lismore Thistles 3 defeated Lismore Workers 2 @ Oakes Oval, Lismore	Lismore Thistles – Troy Newman (hat-trick) Lismore Workers – Neil Wraight, John Wraight
6th	Richmond Rovers	18	7	3	8	23	27	-4	24	Preliminary final	Richmond Rovers defeated Lismore Workers 3–2 on penalties (2–2 at full-time, 2–2 after extra time) @ Oakes Oval, Lismore	Richmond Rovers – Chris Matthews (2 including a penalty) Lismore Workers – Steve Fredericks, Paul Wiltshire
7th	Byron Bay	18	6	5	7	17	24	-7	23	Grand final	Lismore Thistles 1 drew with Richmond Rovers 1 after extra time @ Oakes Oval, Lismore	Lismore Thistles – Steve Morrissey Richmond Rovers – Chris Matthews
8th	Goonellabah	18	4	4	10	21	33	-12	16	Grand final Replay	Lismore Thistles 0 drew with Richmond Rovers 0 after extra time (0–0 at full-time) @ Oakes Oval, Lismore (declared Joint Champions)	
9th	Nimbin Headers	18	4	3	11	20	36	-16	15			
10th	Ballina	18	0	0	18	10	66	-56	0			

=== 1992 – Lismore Thistles undefeated in winning premiership–Cyril Mayo Cup double ===
Position	Club	Played	Won	Drew	Lost	For	Against	Goal difference	Points	1992 Cyril Mayo Cup	Results & venues	Goalscorers
Premiers	Lismore Thistles (Undefeated)	18	18	0	0	44	5	+39	54	Minor Preliminary Semi-final (4th v 5th)	Richmond Rovers 1 defeated Italo Stars 0 @ Weston Park, Goonellabah	Richmond Rovers – Craig Hamshaw
2nd	South Lismore	18	11	4	3	29	12	+17	37	Major Preliminary Semi-final (2nd v 3rd)	Lismore Workers 1 defeated South Lismore 0 @ Oakes Oval, Lismore	Lismore Workers – Dave Condon (penalty)
3rd	Lismore Workers	18	9	6	3	39	18	+21	33	Minor semi-final	South Lismore 4 defeated Richmond Rovers 0 @ Oakes Oval, Lismore	South Lismore – Bruce Mourhaus (2), Brett Towner, Chris Cherry
4th	Richmond Rovers	18	8	6	4	35	22	+13	30	Major semi-final	Lismore Thistles 4 defeated Lismore Workers 0 @ Oakes Oval, Lismore	Lismore Thistles – Steve Morrissey (2), Anthony Nind, Doug Boardman
5th	Italo Stars	18	6	5	7	20	20	0	23	Preliminary final	South Lismore 3 defeated Lismore Workers 2 after extra time (2–2 at full-time) @ Oakes Oval, Lismore	South Lismore – Brett Towner (2), Scott Allen Lismore Workers – Steve Fredericks (penalty), own goal
6th	Goonellabah	18	4	7	7	22	30	-8	19	Grand final	Lismore Thistles 0 drew with South Lismore 0 after extra time @ Oakes Oval, Lismore	
7th	Casino	18	4	5	9	22	30	-8	17	Grand final Replay	Lismore Thistles 2 defeated South Lismore 1 after extra time (0–0 at full-time) @ Oakes Oval, Lismore	Lismore Thistles – Steve Morrissey (2 including a penalty) South Lismore – Bruce Mourhaus
8th	Brunswick Valley	18	4	3	11	18	47	-29	15			
9th	Byron Bay	18	3	3	12	19	41	-22	12			
10th	Nimbin Headers	18	0	7	11	16	39	-23	7			

=== 1993 – South Lismore premiership-Grand final Double ===
South Lismore established its first senior team in 1972 when they entered the old Division 1 finishing 2nd last in a 6-team competition.

In 1992 South Lismore came 2nd to premiers Lismore Thistles in Premier Division. In their first grand final appearance South Lismore were beaten 2–1 by Lismore Thistles after extra time in the grand final replay after the first game ended 0–0 after extra time.

In 1993 the John Percival coached South Lismore won the Premier Division premiership-grand final double. After winning the premiership for the first (and so far only) time by a point from Lismore Workers after a dramatic final round they won the grand final in similarly dramatic fashion when they defeated Lismore Workers 2–1 after extra time.

Going into the last round of fixtures Lismore Workers were leading South Lismore by a point. In the last round Lismore Workers drew 1–1 with second last-placed Italo Stars and South Lismore defeated Goonellabah 2–0 to win their first ever premiership. The final table was:

Position	Club	Points	1993 Finals	Results & venues	Goalscorers
Premiers	South Lismore	38 points	5th Place Play-off	Byron Bay 3 defeated Ballina 1 @ Weston Park, Goonellabah	Byron Bay – Tony Wilson, Craig Hutchison, Marty Jaegers Ballina – Ian Haynes
2nd	Lismore Workers	37	Minor Preliminary Semi-final (4th v 5th)	Goonellabah defeated Byron Bay 7–6 on penalties (2–2 at full-time, 2–2 after extra time) @ Oakes Oval, Lismore	Goonellabah – Tony McLean, Matt Lampard Byron Bay – Glen Godbee, Tony Wilson (penalty)
3rd	Lismore Thistles	34	Major Preliminary Semi-final (2nd v 3rd)	Lismore Workers 2 defeated Lismore Thistles 1 with a golden goal in extra time (1–1 at full-time) @ Weston Park, Goonellabah	Lismore Workers – Mick Geartner, Sam Tancred Lismore Thistles – Leo Rositto
4th	Goonellabah	29	Minor semi-final	Goonellabah defeated Lismore Thistles 4–3 on penalties (2–2 at full-time, 2–2 after extra time) @ Oakes Oval, Lismore	Goonellabah – Tony McLean (2 including a penalty) Lismore Thistles – Darren Beardow (penalty), Mick Gooley
5th	Ballina	29	Major semi-final	Lismore Workers 2 defeated South Lismore 1 with a golden goal in extra time (1–1 at full-time) @ Oakes Oval, Lismore	Lismore Workers – Sam Tancred (2) South Lismore – Brett Towner (penalty)
6th	Byron Bay	29	Preliminary final	South Lismore 1 defeated Goonellabah 0 with a golden goal in extra time (0–0 at full-time) @ Crawford Park, Alstonville	South Lismore – Bruce Mourhaus
7th	Casino	16	Grand final	South Lismore 2 defeated Lismore Workers 1 with a golden goal in extra time (1–1 at full-time) @ Oakes Oval, Lismore	South Lismore – Brett Towner (2) Lismore Workers – Tony Marquart
8th	Richmond Rovers	16			
9th	Italo Stars	14			
10th	Nimbin Headers	5			

South Lismore lost the major semi-final to Lismore Workers 2–1 after extra time before beating Goonellabah 1-0 (Goalscorer – Bruce Mourhaus) after extra time in the preliminary final to make their second successive Premier Division grand final.

The grand final was played under lights at Oakes Oval. Lismore Workers took the lead in the first half thanks to a goal by Tony Marquart. With 2 minutes of normal time remaining Brett Towner scored for South Lismore to force the game into extra time. During extra time a free kick from Troy Percival (South Lismore) was blocked by Lismore Workers' goalkeeper Graham Nesbitt into the path of Brett Towner who scored to give South Lismore a 2–1 win and their first grand final success.

The South Lismore squad for the grand final was:

Player	Position
Shane Hunter	Goalkeeper
Matt Bastion	Sweeper
Scott Allen	Stopper
Dave Turnage	Left back
Paul Hampson	Right back
Jamie Maher	Central midfielder
Jason Percival	Central midfielder
Todd Franks	Right midfielder
Troy Percival	Left midfielder
Bruce Mourhaus	Striker
Brett Towner	Striker
John Bryant	Reserve
Gary Williams	Reserve
Haydon Smith	Reserve Goalkeeper
Darren Maher	Reserve
Matthew Poles	Reserve
Ray Sanders	Reserve

=== 1994 – Goonellabah win premiership-Cyril Mayo Cup Double ===
Position	Club	Played	Won	Drew	Lost	For	Against	Goal difference	Points	1994 Cyril Mayo Cup	Results & venue	Goalscorers
Premiers	Goonellabah	18	13	2	3	41	13	+28	41	Minor Preliminary Semi-final (4th v 5th)	Byron Bay defeated Richmond Rovers 6–5 on penalties (0–0 at full-time, 0–0 after extra time) @ Saunders Park, Ballina	
2nd	Lismore Workers	18	13	2	3	36	17	+19	41	Major Preliminary Semi-final (2nd v 3rd)	Lismore Workers 3 defeated Lismore Thistles 1 @ Oakes Oval, Lismore	Lismore Workers – Paul Wiltshire, Alan Donadel, John Wraight Lismore Thistles – Darren Beardow
3rd	Lismore Thistles	18	12	4	2	32	17	+15	40	Minor semi-final	Byron Bay 3 defeated Lismore Thistles 0 @ Crawford Oval, Alstonville	Byron Bay – Gavin Peel, Brent Simpson, Craig Hutchison
4th	Byron Bay	18	12	4	2	27	13	+14	40	Major semi-final	Goonellabah 1 defeated Lismore Workers 0 @ Oakes Oval, Lismore	Goonellabah – John Newton (penalty)
5th	Richmond Rovers	18	8	3	7	31	26	+5	27	Preliminary final	Lismore Workers 2 defeated Byron Bay 0 @ Jeff Schneider Field, Bangalow	Lismore Workers – Anthony Alvos, Shane Ianna
6th	South Lismore	18	5	5	8	20	21	-1	20	Grand final	Goonellabah 2 defeated Lismore Workers 1 @ Oakes Oval, Lismore	Goonellabah – Martin Sommerville (2) Lismore Workers – Andrew Pearce (penalty)
7th	Italo Stars	18	5	1	12	19	32	-13	16			
8th	Casino	18	4	2	12	22	38	-16	14			
9th	Maclean	18	3	3	12	21	48	-27	12			
10th	Ballina	18	0	4	14	18	42	-24	4			

=== 1995 – Goonellabah win premiership-Cyril Mayo Cup Double ... Again ===
Position	Club	Played	Won	Drew	Lost	For	Against	Points	1995 Cyril Mayo Cup	Results & venues	Goalscorers
Premiers	Goonellabah	22	19	1	2	54	8	58	Minor Preliminary Semi-final (4th v 5th)	Ballina 2 defeated Richmond Rovers 1 @ Thistles Park, East Lismore	Ballina – Justin Stockham (2) Richmond Rovers – Josh Taylor
2nd	Lismore Workers	22	15	2	5	54	19	47	Major Preliminary Semi-final (2nd v 3rd)	Lismore Workers 3 defeated Lismore Thistles 2 @ Oakes Oval	Lismore Workers – Brad Bosworth (2), Shane Ianna Lismore Thistles – Graham Prior, Darren Beardow
3rd	Lismore Thistles	22	12	8	2	39	16	44	Minor semi-final	Lismore Thistles 3 defeated Ballina 1 @ Crawford Park, Alstonville	Lismore Thistles – Jeremy Pollard (2), Darren Beardow Ballina – Phil Dalli
4th	Richmond Rovers	22	11	7	4	46	27	40	Major semi-final	Lismore Workers defeated Goonellabah 3–2 on penalties (0–0 at full-time, 0–0 after extra time) @ Caniaba Street, South Lismore	
5th	Ballina	22	7	6	9	18	33	27	Preliminary final	Goonellabah 2 defeated Lismore Thistles 1 after extra time (1–1 at full-time) @ Nielson Park, East Lismore	Goonellabah – own goal, Jim Phillips Lismore Thistles – Rod Kirkland
6th	South Lismore	22	7	5	10	25	36	26	Grand final	Goonellabah 3 defeated Lismore Workers 2 @ Oakes Oval, Lismore	Goonellabah – Jim Phillips (2 including 2 penalties), Phil Cook Lismore Workers – John Wraight (2)
7th	Maclean	22	7	4	11	25	37	25			
8th	Grafton	22	6	5	11	25	39	23			
9th	Byron Bay	22	5	7	10	33	47	22			
10th	Casino	22	5	4	13	35	57	19			
11th	Alstonville	22	4	5	13	15	29	17			
12th	Italo Stars	22	3	8	11	22	43	17			

=== 1996 – Lismore Workers win 13th premiership-Richmond Rovers win 6th Cyril Mayo Cup ===
Position	Club	Played	Won	Drew	Lost	For	Against	Goal difference	Points	1996 Cyril Mayo Cup	Results & venues	Goalscorers
Premiers	Lismore Workers	22	18	0	4	52	13	+39	54	Minor preliminary final (4th v 5th)	Lismore Thistles 5 defeated South Lismore 1 @ Nielson Park, East Lismore	Lismore Thistles – Craig Kennedy (2 penalties), Anthony Nind, Brett Beardow, David Burns South Lismore – Todd Franks
2nd	Richmond Rovers	22	15	3	4	52	18	+34	48	Major preliminary final (2nd v 3rd)	Richmond Rovers 2 defeated Goonellabah 0 @ Oakes Oval, Lismore	Richmond Rovers – Josh Taylor (2)
3rd	Goonellabah	22	14	3	5	68	27	+41	45	Minor semi-final	Goonellabah 2 defeated Lismore Thistles 1 @ Oakes Oval, Lismore	Goonellabah – Shane Wilson, Jim Phillips Lismore Thistles – Michael Nind
4th	South Lismore	22	13	6	3	48	21	+27	45	Major semi-final	Richmond Rovers 1 defeated Lismore Workers 0 @ Thistles Park, East Lismore	Richmond Rovers – Andrew Newett
5th	Lismore Thistles	22	11	6	5	37	20	+17	39	Preliminary final	Goonellabah 2 defeated Lismore Workers 0 @ Oakes Oval, Lismore	Goonellabah – Matthew Lampard, Matthew Olley (penalty)
6th	Byron Bay	22	8	5	9	34	40	-6	28	Grand final	Richmond Rovers 2 defeated Goonellabah 1 @ Oakes Oval, Lismore	Richmond Rovers – Josh Taylor, Mark Coster Goonellabah – Matthew Olley
7th	Grafton	22	9	2	11	30	42	-12	29			
8th	Ballina	22	8	2	12	22	37	-15	26			
9th	Nimbin Headers	22	5	5	12	20	51	-31	20			
10th	Casino	22	3	6	13	15	39	-24	15			
11th	Maclean	22	4	3	15	27	52	-25	15			
12th	Alstonville	22	2	3	17	17	62	-45	9			

=== 1997 – Casino Take Cyril Out of Lismore For the First Time in Almost 50 Years ===
In 1997 Casino won their first grand final and became the first club from outside Lismore to win the Cyril Mayo Cup for the Premier Division championship in almost 50 years. The long-defunct Casino Rebels won the inaugural grand final and the Arthur Brand Cup in 1950 in a disputed grand final replay against Eastwood United.

In 1997 Casino finished on equal points with Lismore Workers (their 14th premiership including 10 as Eastwood United) but second on goal difference in the 12-team Premier Division:

Position	Club	Played	Won	Drew	Lost	Points	1997 Finals	Results & venues	Scorers
Premiers	Lismore Workers	22	15	3	4	48	Minor Preliminary Semi-final (4th v 5th)	Lismore Thistles 2 defeated Byron Bay 0 @ Bangalow Recreation Reserve	Lismore Thistles – Chris Harley, Todd Franks
2nd	Casino	22	15	3	4	48	Major Preliminary Semi-final (2nd v 3rd)	Casino 1 defeated Goonellabah 0 @ Oakes Oval, Lismore	Casino – Ken Reichmann
3rd	Goonellabah	22	13	5	4	44	Minor semi-final	Goonellabah 2 defeated Lismore Thistles 0 @ Nielson Park, East Lismore	Goonellabah – Leo Silva, Greg Huxtable (penalty)
4th	Lismore Thistles	22	11	5	6	38	Major semi-final	Casino 1 defeated Lismore Workers 0 @ Weston Park, Goonellabah	Casino – Dave Hood
5th	Byron Bay	22	10	5	7	35	Preliminary final	Lismore Workers 1 defeated Goonellabah 0 after extra time (0–0 at full-time) @ Thistles Park, East Lismore	Lismore Workers – Glen Gilchrist
6th	Italo Stars	22	10	4	8	34	Grand final	Casino 2 defeated Lismore Workers 1 @ Oakes Oval, Lismore	Casino – Stewart Coughran, Paul Wiltshire Lismore Workers – Brad Bosworth
7th	Maclean	22	9	4	9	31			
8th	Ballina	22	9	2	11	29			
9th	South Lismore	22	8	4	10	28			
10th	Richmond Rovers	22	7	4	11	25			
11th	Grafton	22	4	1	17	13			
12th	Nimbin Headers	22	1	0	21	3			

In the major preliminary semi-final Casino defeated Goonellabah 1–0 at a packed Oakes Oval thanks to a Ken Reichmann chip over Goonellabah's goalkeeper Paul Hickey. This game was played as a curtain-raiser to a pre-season Ericcson Cup (National Soccer League) game between Brisbane Strikers and Marconi which attracted more than 5,000 fans.

In the major semi-final at Weston Park, Casino defeated Lismore Workers 1–0 with a first half goal by Dave Hood, and made history by reaching their first ever grand final. Lismore Workers reached the grand final after defeating Goonellabah 1–0 in the preliminary final after a 108th minute extra time goal by Glen Gilchrist.

The grand final between Casino and Lismore Workers was played at a water-logged Oakes Oval. A wild storm including rain, wind and thunder forced the players off the field after 10 minutes of play. After a 40-minute break the players returned to a drenched surface. Casino scored first when sweeper Stewart Coughran drove a free-kick from just outside the penalty box, around the wall and past goalkeeper Justin Marks. Soon after scoring Coughran was stretchered off with an ankle injury, briefly returned but was substituted before half-time and played no further part in the game. With 15 minutes remaining Paul Wiltshire made it 2–0 to Casino when he scored with a "venomous" shot from 20 metres. With 5 minutes to go Lismore Workers scored with a Brad Bosworth headed goal from a corner. But Casino held on to win the grand final 2–1. The player of the match was Casino's Wayne Mortimer.

The squads, coaches and support staff for the grand final were:

Casino Cobras' Squad	Player	Lismore Workers' Squad	Player
Goalkeeper	Joel Renshaw	Goalkeeper	Justin Marks
Left back	John Hartley	Sweeper	Brad Bosworth
Right back	Mal Kenny	Central defender	Jason Toniello
Sweeper	Stewart Coughran	Central defender	Matthew Walsh
Stopper	Shane Hogan	Left wing-back	Wayne Marchant
Left midfield	Scott Bruni	Right sing-back	Matthew Clegg
Right midfield	Dave Hood	Central midfield	Mark Foster
Central midfield	Paul Wiltshire	Central midfield	Steve Fredericks
Central midfield & coach	Jeff Hogan	Central midfield	Jason Monk
Striker	Wayne Mortimer	Attacking midfield	Anthony Alvos
Striker	Nathan Scully	Striker	John Wraight
Reserve	Terry Blasche	Striker	Glen Gilchrist
Reserve	Scott Creighton	Reserve	Barry Manning
Reserve	Rohan Coe	Reserve	Craig Wiblin
Reserve	Tim Miller	Reserve	Adam Morrisey
Reserve	Glen Armstrong	Reserve Goalkeeper	Andrew McGregor
Coach	Jeff Hogan	Coach	Graham Bird
Manager	Tony McAteer	Manager	John Walsh
Strapper	Gary Shepard	Strapper	Robert Donadel

=== 1997 – Matildas Beaten by Classy Chinese ===
In November 1997 the Matildas played China at Oakes Oval, Lismore as part of a Tri-Series involving China, New Zealand and Australia.

A crowd of more than 3,000 saw the Chinese team win 3–0 with the 3 first half goals, the goalscorers being Shui Qingxia, Sun Qingmei and Zhao Lihong. The local press were glowing of the Chinese team ... their "silken touch, ... superb ball skills, such a desire to be the best".

The game was historic because it was the first game China had played in Australia, and for the inclusion of Lismore local Lisa Casagrande in the Australian team. Casagrande was replaced late in the first half due to calf cramps.

In the curtain-raiser the Soccer Far North Coast Under-16 girls team defeated the Coffs Harbour Under-16 girls team 4–1. Goalscorers for Soccer Far North Coast were Martene Edwards (2), Amy Brown and Olivia Brisby with Katrina Byrnes scoring for Coffs Harbour.

The winner of the Matilda for a Day competition run by The Northern Star newspaper including a Matildas playing strip, match ball and spending game day with the team was Kym Butts of South Gundurimba.

=== 1998 – 50th season ===
Position	Club	Played	Won	Drew	Lost	For	Against	Goal difference	Points	1998 Cyril Mayo Cup	Results & venues	Goalscorers
Premiers	Goonellabah	22	14	6	2	51	24	+27	48	Knock-out Semi-final (4th v 5th)	Ballina 3 defeated Italo Stars 1 @ Colley Park, Casino	Ballina – Justin Stockham (penalty), Troy Percival, Danny Vincent Italo Stars – Unknown (penalty)
2nd	Lismore Workers	22	13	7	2	47	23	+24	46	Major Preliminary Semi-final (2nd v 3rd)	Lismore Workers 1 defeated Richmond Rovers 0 @ Colley Park, Casino	Lismore Workers – Paul Wiltshire
3rd	Richmond Rovers	22	12	6	4	35	29	+6	42	Minor semi-final	Richmond Rovers defeated Ballina (4–2) on penalties (0–0 at full-time, 0–0 after extra time) @ Nielson Park, East Lismore	
4th	Italo Stars	22	11	5	6	35	33	+2	38	Major semi-final	Goonellabah 2 defeated Lismore Workers 1 @ Weston Park, Goonellabah	Goonellabah – Matthew Lampard, Adam Hughes Lismore Workers – Brad Bosworth
5th	Ballina	22	11	3	8	47	34	+13	36	Preliminary final	Richmond Rovers 4 defeated Lismore Workers 2 @ Lismore Italo-Australian Sports & Recreation Club, Barrow Lane, Lismore	Richmond Rovers – Mark Coster, Jamie Maher, Andrew Witchard, Robbie Armbruster Lismore Workers – Jeremy Wraight, John Wraight
6th	Casino	22	10	6	6	46	36	+10	36	Grand final	Richmond Rovers defeated Goonellabah (4–3) on penalties (0–0 at full-time, 0–0 after extra time) @ Oakes Oval, Lismore	
7th	Lismore Thistles	22	9	7	6	46	32	+14	34			
8th	Byron Bay	22	4	7	11	28	35	-7	19			
9th	Maclean	22	4	7	11	30	48	-18	19			
10th	Southern Cross University	22	6	1	15	30	52	– 22	19			
11th	South Lismore	22	3	6	13	35	49	-14	15			
12th	Alstonville	22	2	5	15	18	53	-35	11			

=== 1999 – premiership leaves Lismore for the first time ever ===
In 1999 Maclean re-wrote FFNC record books by becoming the first club from outside Lismore to win the top grade premiership in its 51-year history. Maclean and Goonellabah finished equal on points, with Maclean's superior goal difference clinching their first premiership.

The 1999 premier division finals (for the Cyril Mayo Cup) were reduced to 4 teams due to time constraints and ground unavailability following a wet season where many games were washed out.

Position	Club	Points	1999 Cyril Mayo Cup	Results & venues	Goalscorers
Premiers	Maclean	39	Semi-final (2nd v 3rd)	Goonellabah 2 defeated Italo Stars 1 @ Weston Park, Goonellabah	Goonellabah – Matthew Prior, Adam Hughes Italo Stars – Mark Maslen
2nd	Goonellabah	39	Semi-final (1st v 4th)	Richmond Rovers 1 defeated Maclean 0 @ Yamba Sporting Complex	Richmond Rovers – Brendan Matthews
3rd	Italo Stars	37	Grand final	Richmond Rovers 1 defeated Goonellabah 0 @ Oakes Oval, Lismore	Richmond Rovers – Josh Saye
4th	Richmond Rovers	35			
5th	Ballina	34			
6th	Lismore Thistles	33			
7th	South Lismore	29			
8th	Southern Cross University	28			
9th	Lismore Workers	24			
10th	Byron Bay	13			
11th	Bangalow	2			

=== 2000 – Italo Stars win premiership-Cyril Mayo Cup Double ===
Position	Club	Points	2000 Cyril Mayo Cup	Results & venues	Goalscorers
Premiers	Italo Stars	40	Elimination Semi-final (4th v 5th)	Maclean 4 defeated Lismore Workers 2 @ Richards Oval, Lismore	Maclean – Gary Carmichael (2), Kevin Crofton, Daniel Fong Lismore Workers – Unknown
2nd	Southern Cross University	36	Preliminary Semi-final (2nd v 3rd)	Richmond Rovers 3 defeated Southern Cross University 2 after extra time (2–2 at full-time) @ Weston Park, Goonellabah	Richmond Rovers – Ian McGregor, Mark Greentree, Tim Sheridan Southern Cross University – Todd Patch (2 including a penalty)
3rd	Richmond Rovers	34	Minor semi-final	Southern Cross University 4 defeated Maclean 2 @ Maurie Ryan Field, Southern Cross University, Lismore	Southern Cross University – Scott Collins (2), Todd Patch, Radan Sturm Maclean – Gary Carmichael, Unknown
4th	Lismore Workers	34	Major semi-final	Italo Stars 1 defeated Richmond Rovers 0 @ Lismore Italo-Australian Sports & Recreation Club, Barrow Lane, Lismore	Italo Stars – own goal
5th	Maclean	32	Preliminary final	Southern Cross University 2 defeated Richmond Rovers 1 after extra time (1–1 at full-time) @ Caniaba Street, South Lismore	Southern Cross University – Dean Stensholm, Stewart Coughran Richmond Rovers – Mark Greentree
6th	Lismore Thistles	32	Final	Italo Stars defeated Southern Cross University on penalties (4–2) (1–1 at full-time, 1–1 after extra time) @ Oakes Oval, Lismore	Italo Stars – Todd Gava Southern Cross University – Radan Sturm
7th	Ballina	30			
8th	Goonellabah	26			
9th	Byron Bay	24			
10th	Casino	17			
11th	South Lismore	6			

=== 2001 – Maclean win premiership – Cyril Mayo Cup double including first Cyril Mayo Cup ===
Position	Club	Points	2001 Cyril Mayo Cup	Results & venues	Goalscorers
Premiers	Maclean	53	Elimination Semi-final (4th v 5th)	Byron Bay 3 defeated Lismore Thistles 1 @ Byron Recreation Ground	Byron Bay – Todd Knaus, Jed Wright, Bruce Morhaus Lismore Thistles – Darren Beardow
2nd	Italo Stars	45	Major semi-final (2nd v 3rd)	Italo Stars 2 defeated Richmond Rovers 1 @ Lismore Italo-Australian Sports & Recreation Club, Barrow Lane, Lismore	Italo Stars – Jeremy Pollard, Nick Harris Richmond Rovers – Zenon Kowalczyk (penalty)
3rd	Richmond Rovers	43	Minor semi-final	Byron Bay 2 defeated Richmond Rovers 1 @ Richards Oval, Lismore	Byron Bay – Unknown Richmond Rovers – Unknown
4th	Byron Bay	42	Major semi-final	Maclean 2 defeated Italo Stars 0 @ Wherrett Park, Maclean	Maclean – Daniel Fung, Aaron Bylos
5th	Lismore Thistles	33	Preliminary final	Byron Bay 2 defeated Italo Stars 1 @ Lismore Italo-Australian Sports & Recreation Club, Barrow Lane, Lismore	Byron Bay – Luke Glanz, Glen Sheldrick Italo Stars – Mark Maslen
6th	Ballina	32	Grand final	Maclean 3 defeated Byron Bay 2 @ Oakes Oval, Lismore	Maclean – Aaron Bylos, Kevin Crofton, own goal Byron Bay – Aaron Richter-Steers, Nathan Jones
7th	Southern Cross University	30			
8th	Casino	29			
9th	Lismore Workers	29			
10th	Alstonville	14			
11th	South Lismore	12			
12th	Goonellabah	10			

=== 2001 – Matildas play France in Lismore ===
In January 2001 the Matildas played France at Oakes Oval, Lismore. This was the second time the Matildas had played in Lismore, having played China at Oakes Oval in November 1997.

This was the second game in the 3 match Australia Cup series; the first game being played at the Coffs Harbour International Stadium and the final game at Carrara Stadium.

A crowd of 2,350 saw a hard, physical game end in a 1–1 draw. The Matildas took a late lead when in the 86th minute Kim Revell latched onto a through ball from Sharon Black and slipped her shot past the French goalkeeper. France equalised soon after in the 88th minute when Stephanie Mugneret Beghe blasted home after a cut-back from the bye-line.

The curtain-raiser between Soccer Far North Coast Under-17's and New England Under-17's also ended in a 1–1 draw. The goalscorer for Soccer Far North Coast was Hollie Jarrett after great lead-up play by Megan Janezic. Samantha Dowse of Goonellabah won the Matilda For A Day competition run The Northern Star newspaper which included a Matildas playing strip, match ball and spending the day with the Matildas.

=== 2002 – Italo Stars win ANZAC Cup–premiership double, Richmond Rovers win Cyril Mayo Cup ===
Position	Club	Points	2002 Cyril Mayo Cup	Results & venues	Goalscorers
Premiers	Italo Stars	50	Elimination Semi-final (4th v 5th)	Ballina 3 defeated Lismore Workers 2 @ Saunders Oval, Ballina	Ballina – Paul Kirkland, Rod Troughton, Justin Stockham (penalty) Lismore Workers – Anthony Alvos, Tom Guttormsen (penalty)
2nd	Byron Bay	49	Major Preliminary Semi-final (2nd v 3rd)	Richmond Rovers 1 defeated Byron Bay 0 @ Byron Recreation Ground	Richmond Rovers – Andrew Gray
3rd	Richmond Rovers	46	Minor semi-final	Ballina 1 defeated Byron Bay 0 @ Byron Recreation Ground	Ballina – Clint Colless
4th	Ballina	40	Major semi-final	Italo Stars 2 defeated Richmond Rovers 1 @ Lismore Italo-Australian Sports & Recreation Club, Barrow Lane, Lismore	Italo Stars – Max Latimer, Craig Wiblen Richmond Rovers – Luke McAnelly
5th	Lismore Workers	39	Preliminary final	Richmond Rovers 2 defeated Ballina 1 @ Nielson Park, East Lismore	Richmond Rovers – Luke McAnelly, Troy Matthews (penalty) Ballina – Christian Watson
6th	Lismore Thistles	31	Grand final	Richmond Rovers 3 defeated Italo Stars 1 @ Oakes Oval, Lismore	Richmond Rovers – Steve Arnett, Brett Lane, Chris Matthews (penalty) Italo Stars – Craig Wiblen
7th	Maclean	27			
8th	Casino	27			
9th	Alstonville	22			
10th	Southern Cross University	21			
11th	Goonellabah	18			
12th	South Lismore	6			

=== 2003 – Italo Stars are undefeated premiers & champions ===
Position	Club	Played	Won	Drew	Lost	For	Against	Goal difference	Points	2003 Cyril Mayo Cup	Results & venues	Goalscorers
Premiers	Italo Stars (Undefeated)	18	15	3	0	46	14	+32	48	Minor preliminary final (4th v 5th)	Richmond Rovers 2 defeated Lismore Workers 0 @ Nielson Park, East Lismore	Richmond Rovers – Josh Saye, Troy Matthews (penalty)
2nd	Ballina	18	12	4	2	39	18	+21	40	Major preliminary final (2nd v 3rd)	Byron Bay 1 defeated Ballina 0 @ Saunders Oval, Ballina	Byron Bay – Jed Wright
3rd	Byron Bay	18	10	2	6	41	27	+14	32	Minor semi-final	Ballina 2 defeated Richmond Rovers 0 @ Saunders Oval, Ballina	Ballina – Jordy Campbell, Christian Watson
4th	Richmond Rovers	18	8	4	6	40	31	+9	28	Major semi-final	Italo Stars 2 defeated Byron Bay 1 @ Lismore Italo-Australian Sports & Recreation Club, Barrow Lane, Lismore	Italo Stars – Max Latimer (2 penalties) Byron Bay – Floyd Pandava
5th	Lismore Workers	18	8	4	6	38	34	+4	28	Preliminary final	Ballina 2 defeated Byron Bay 1 @ Weston Park, Goonellabah	Ballina – Clint Colless (2) Byron Bay – Jens Walter
6th	Maclean	18	7	5	6	34	26	+8	26	Grand final	Italo Stars 1 defeated Ballina 0 @ Oakes Oval, Lismore	Italo Stars – Clint Willoughby
7th	Alstonville	18	5	1	12	21	35	-14	16			
8th	Casino	18	4	4	10	25	39	-14	16			
9th	Lismore Thistles	18	4	2	12	21	43	-22	14			
10th	Southern Cross University	18	2	1	15	16	54	-38	7			

=== 2004 – Richmond Rovers win premiership, Lismore Workers win first grand final since 1990 ===
Position	Club	Played	Won	Drew	Lost	For	Against	Goal difference	Points	2004 Cyril Mayo Cup	Results & venues	Goalscorers
Premiers	Richmond Rovers	18	11	5	2	48	27	+21	38	Minor Preliminary Semi-final (4th v 5th)	Byron Bay 3 defeated Maclean 0 @ Wherrett Park, Maclean	Byron Bay – Nathan Jones, Ryan Gray, Aaron Richter-Steers
2nd	Lismore Workers	18	11	3	4	51	21	+30	36	Major Preliminary Semi-final (2nd v 3rd)	Lismore Workers 3 defeated Casino 0 @ Richards Oval, Lismore	Lismore Workers – Tom Guttormsen, John Wraight, Steve Morrissey
3rd	Casino	18	10	3	5	44	23	+21	33	Minor semi-final	Byron Bay 1 defeated Casino 0 @ Colley Park, Casino	Byron Bay – Adam Bostock
4th	Maclean	18	9	4	5	47	29	+18	31	Major semi-final	Richmond Rovers 3 defeated Lismore Workers 2 @ Nielson Park, East Lismore	Richmond Rovers – Matthew Olley (2), Scott Coster Lismore Workers – Steve Morrissey, Zac Crowley
5th	Byron Bay	18	7	7	4	47	35	+12	28	Preliminary final	Lismore Workers 2 defeated Byron Bay 0 @ Richards Oval, Lismore	Lismore Workers – Zac Crowley, Shane Banks
6th	Italo Stars	18	7	3	8	31	43	-12	24	Grand final	Lismore Workers 2 defeated Richmond Rovers 1 @ Oakes Oval, Lismore	Lismore Workers – Lucas MacPherson, John Wraight Richmond Rovers – Matthew Olley
7th	Ballina	18	6	3	9	25	25	0	21			
8th	Lismore Thistles	18	4	3	11	12	40	-28	15			
9th	Bangalow	18	4	2	12	18	39	-21	14			
10th	Alstonville	18	4	1	13	14	55	-41	13			

=== 2005 – a season of firsts; Goonellabah wins premiership in their first season back in Premier League, Byron Bay win their first grand final (Cyril Mayo Cup) ===
Position	Club	Played	Won	Drew	Lost	Points	2005 Cyril Mayo Cup	Results & venues	Goalscorers
Premiers	Goonellabah	18	12	4	2	40	Minor Preliminary Semi-final (4th v 5th)	Italo Stars 2 defeated Lismore Workers 0 @ Lismore Italo-Australian Sports & Recreation Club, Barrow Lane, Lismore	Italo Stars – Mark Maslen, Wayne Mortimer
2nd	Byron Bay	18	10	3	5	33	Major Preliminary Semi-final (2nd v 3rd)	Byron Bay 2 defeated Richmond Rovers 0 @ Byron Recreation Reserve	Byron Bay – Adam Bostock, Paul Bird
3rd	Richmond Rovers	18	9	5	4	32	Minor semi-final	Italo Stars 1 defeated Richmond Rovers 0 @ Nielson Park, East Lismore	Italo Stars – Mark Maslen
4th	Italo Stars	18	9	4	5	31	Major semi-final	Goonellabah 2 defeated Byron Bay 0 @ Weston Park, Goonellabah	Goonellabah – Ben Andrews, Peter O'Neill
5th	Lismore Workers	18	9	3	6	30	Preliminary final	Byron Bay 4 defeated Italo Stars 1 @ Byron Recreation Reserve	Byron Bay – Paul Bird (2), Tom Ruhl, Bruce Morhaus Italo Stars – Max Latimer
6th	Ballina	18	8	5	5	29	Grand final	Byron Bay 1 defeated Goonellabah 0 @ Oakes Oval, Lismore	Byron Bay – Shaun Packham
7th	Maclean	18	4	6	8	18			
8th	Lismore Thistles	18	4	4	10	16			
9th	Casino	18	5	1	12	16			
10th	Bangalow	18	2	1	15	7			

=== 2006 – Byron Bay's first premiership–Grand final double ===
Position	Club	Played	Won	Drew	Lost	For	Against	Points	2006 Cyril Mayo Cup	Results & venues	Goalscorers
Premiers	Byron Bay	18	14	2	2	49	22	44	Minor Preliminary Semi-final (4th v 5th)	Lennox Head 4 defeated Italo Stars 3 after extra time (3–3 at full-time) @ Skennars Heads Reserve	Lennox Head – Troy Percival (2), Rameesh Moaaz, Adrian Zakaras Italo Stars – Matt Weir, Wayne Mortimer (penalty), own goal
2nd	Richmond Rovers	18	11	3	4	37	25	36	Major Preliminary Semi-final (2nd v 3rd)	Richmond Rovers 3 defeated Maclean 0 @ Nielson Park, East Lismore	Richmond Rovers – Adam Gray, Chris Matthews, Russell Dent
3rd	Maclean	18	10	2	6	50	30	32	Minor semi-final	Maclean 2 defeated Lennox Head 1 @ Wherrett Park, Maclean	Maclean – Grant Nielson (2) Lennox Head – Troy Percival
4th	Lennox Head	18	10	2	6	43	30	32	Major semi-final	Byron Bay defeated Richmond Rovers 3–1 on penalties (5–5 after extra time, 4–4 at full-time) @ Byron Recreation Reserve	Byron Bay – Jonathan Pierce, Tom Ruhl, Aaron Richter-Steers (penalty), Shaun Packham, Joel Rudgley Richmond Rovers – Aaron Heffernan (2), Adam Gray (2), Ian McGregor
5th	Italo Stars	18	8	2	8	41	36	26	Preliminary final	Richmond Rovers 4 defeated Maclean 1 @ Nielson Park, East Lismore	Richmond Rovers – Aaron Heffernan (2), Andrew Gray (2) Maclean – Travis Armstrong (penalty)
6th	Goonellabah	18	7	4	7	33	27	25	Grand final	Byron Bay 2 defeated Richmond Rovers 1 after extra time (1–1 at full-time) @ Oakes Oval, Lismore	Byron Bay – Bruce Morhaus, Tom Ruhl Richmond Rovers – Aaron Heffernan
7th	Lismore Workers	18	7	2	9	34	38	23			
8th	Ballina	18	4	4	10	24	33	16			
9th	Lismore Thistles	18	4	4	10	21	56	16			
10th	Casino	18	1	3	14	11	47	6			

=== 2007 to 2011 – Richmond Rovers dominate ===
From 2007 to 2011 Richmond Rovers won 10 of the 15 trophies on offer in Premier League and dominated the competition and opposition clubs:

- ANZAC Shields – 2 in 2008 and 2009
- premierships – 4 in 2007, 2008, 2009 and 2011
- Grand finals (Cyril Mayo Cup) – 4 in 2007, 2008, 2009 and 2010

In doing so Richmond Rovers won the treble (ANZAC Shield, premiership and grand final) in 2008 and 2009 and the premiership-Grand final double in 2007, 2008 and 2009.

==== 2007 Premier League table and finals results ====
- 4th premiership, 10th championship

Position	Club	Points	2007 Finals	Results & venues	Goalscorers
Premiers	Richmond Rovers	40	Minor Preliminary Semi-final (4th v 5th)	Goonellabah 3 defeated Maclean 0 @ Wherett Park, Maclean	Goonellabah – Steve Foster, Dave Annetts (2)
2nd	Italo Stars	34	Major Preliminary Semi-final (2nd v 3rd)	Italo Stars 4 defeated Byron Bay 1 @ Italo-Australian Sports & Recreation Club, North Lismore	Italo Stars – Wayne Mortimer, Brenton Mumford, Max Latimer (penalty), Matt Pratten Byron Bay – Jonathan Pierce
3rd	Byron Bay	33	Minor semi-final	Goonellabah 3 defeated Byron Bay 1 @ Byron Recreation Grounds	Goonellabah – Kale Hopper, Adam Barnes, Ben Andrews Byron Bay – Todd Knaus
4th	Maclean	30	Major semi-final	Italo Stars won 7–6 on penalties against Richmond Rovers (2–2 after extra-time, 2–2 at full-time) @ Nielson Park, East Lismore	Italo Stars – Max Latimer (2 penalties) Richmond Rovers – Ian McGregor, Ben Casagrande
5th	Goonellabah	28	Preliminary final	Richmond Rovers defeated Goonellabah on penalties (2–2 after extra time, 2–2 at full-time) @ Nielson Park, East Lismore	Richmond Rovers – Ben Casagrande, Matthew Olley Goonellabah – Peter O'Neil (2 penalties)
6th	Lennox Head	28	Grand final	Richmond Rovers 1 defeated Italo Stars 0 @ Oakes Oval, Lismore	Richmond Rovers – Troy Matthews (penalty)
7th	Bangalow	24			
8th	Ballina	21			
9th	Lismore Workers	11			
10th	Burringbar	4			

==== 2008 Premier League table and finals results ====
- 5th premiership, 11th championship

Position	Club	Points	2008 Finals	Results & venues	Goalscorers
Premiers	Richmond Rovers	34	Minor Preliminary Semi-final (4th v 5th)	Lismore Thistles 3 defeated Italo Stars 1 @ Thistles Park, East Lismore	Lismore Thistles – Matt Parrish (3) Italo Stars – Zac Innes
2nd	Lennox Head	33	Major Preliminary Semi-final (2nd v 3rd)	Lennox Head 1 defeated Ballina 0 @ Skennars Head Oval, Lennox Head	Lennox Head – Justin Stockham
3rd	Ballina	31	Minor semi-final	Lismore Thistles 2 defeated Ballina 0 @ Saunders Oval, Ballina	Lismore Thistles – Matt Parrish, Tom Boland
4th	Lismore Thistles	30	Major semi-final	Richmond Rovers 3 defeated Lennox Head 1 @ Nielson Park, East Lismore	Richmond Rovers – Aaron Heffernan (2), Ben Casagrande Lennox Head – Rameesh Kassim
5th	Italo Stars	29 *	Preliminary final	Lennox Head 1 defeated Lismore Thistles @ Skennars Head Oval, Lennox Head	Lennox Head – Peter Edwards
6th	Byron Bay	23	Grand final	Richmond Rovers 3 defeated Lennox Head 1 @ Oakes Oval, Lismore	Richmond Rovers – Brett Lane, Ian McGregor, Aaron Heffernan Lennox Head – Peter O'Neill
7th	Goonellabah	18			
8th	Bangalow	15			
9th	Lismore Workers	14			
10th	Pottsville	12			

* 9 point penalty for crowd misbehavior at the 2007 grand final

==== 2009 Premier League table and finals results ====
- 6th premiership, 12th championship

Position	Club	Points	2009 Finals	Results & venues	Goalscorers
Premiers	Richmond Rovers	42	Minor Preliminary Semi-final (4th v 5th)	Italo Stars 2 defeated Lismore Workers 0 @ Italo-Australian Sports & Recreation Club, North Lismore	Italo Stars – own goal, Clint Willoughby
2nd	Goonellabah	37	Major Preliminary Semi-final (2nd v 3rd)	Goonellabah 2 defeated Byron Bay 0 @ Weston Park, Goonellabah	Goonellabah – Dave Annetts, Chris Matthews
3rd	Byron Bay	33	Minor semi-final	Italo Stars 3 defeated Byron Bay 1 @ Byron Recreation Grounds	Italo Stars – Clint Willoughby, Max Latimer (2) Byron Bay – Jordy Campbell
4th	Italo Stars	30	Major semi-final	Richmond Rovers 5 defeated Goonellabah 2 @ Nielson Park, East Lismore	Richmond Rovers – Troy Matthews (2), Ben Casagrande, Jonathan See, Andrew Marshall (penalty) Goonellabah – Dave Annetts, own goal
5th	Lismore Workers	28	Preliminary final	Goonellabah 2 defeated Italo Stars 0 @ Weston Park, Goonellabah	Goonellabah – Dave Annetts, Ben Andrews
6th	Ballina	26	Grand final	Richmond Rovers 3 defeated Goonellabah 1 @ Crozier Field, Lismore	Richmond Rovers – Tim Casagrande (penalty), own goal, Russell Dent (penalty) Goonellabah – own goal
7th	Bangalow	15			
8th	Alstonville	12			
9th	Lismore Thistles	12			
10th	Lennox Head	11			

==== 2010 Premier League table and finals results ====
- 13th championship

Position	Club	Played	Won	Drawn	Lost	For	Against	Points	2010 Finals	Results & venues	Goalscorers
Premiers	Goonellabah	18	16	1	1	61	16	49	Minor Preliminary Semi-final (4th v 5th)	Lismore Thistles 3 defeated Ballina 1 @ Saunders Oval, Ballina	Lismore Thistles – Darren Beardow, Jake Nind, Brenton Parrish Ballina – Andrew Lundie
2nd	Richmond Rovers	18	14	0	4	55	29	42	Major Preliminary Semi-final (2nd v 3rd)	Richmond Rovers 2 defeated Pottsville Beach 0 @ Nielson Park, East Lismore	Richmond Rovers – Scott Coster, Tim Sheridan
3rd	Pottsville Beach	18	10	3	5	45	34	33	Minor semi-final	Lismore Thistles 5 defeated Pottsville 2 @ Koala Beach Sports Fields, Pottsville Beach	Lismore Thistles – Brenton Parrish (3), Jake Nind (penalty), Jakeb Speers Pottsville Beach – Josh McQueen, Mike Kolovos
4th	Ballina	18	7	4	7	35	37	25	Major semi-final	Goonellabah 2 defeated Richmond Rovers 1 @ Weston Park, Goonellabah	Goonellabah – own goal, Kale Hopper (penalty) Richmond Rovers – Aaron Heffernan
5th	Lismore Thistles	18	7	3	8	34	48	24	Preliminary final	Richmond Rovers 1 defeated Lismore Thistles 0 @ Nielson Park, East Lismore	Richmond Rovers – Scott Coster
6th	Alstonville	18	5	7	6	34	32	22	Grand final	Richmond Rovers 2 defeated Goonellabah 1 @ Oakes Oval, Lismore	Richmond Rovers – Aaron Heffernan, Tim Sheridan Goonellabah – Matt Dorigo
7th	Byron Bay	18	6	2	10	35	43	20			
8th	Lismore Workers	18	5	3	10	26	40	18			
9th	Italo Stars	18	2	6	10	17	30	12			
10th	Bangalow	18	2	3	13	17	50	9			

==== 2011 Premier League table and finals results ====
- 7th premiership

Position	Club	Played	Won	Drew	Lost	For	Against	Points	2011 Finals	Results & venues	Goalscorers
Premiers	Richmond Rovers	18	13	3	2	58	20	42	Minor Preliminary Semi-final (4th v 5th)	Lismore Workers 3 defeated Byron Bay 1 @ Saunders Oval, Ballina	Lismore Workers – Shaun McDonald, Cameron Hyde (2) Byron Bay – Kazuhiro Tsukamoto
2nd	Goonellabah	18	10	3	5	31	14	33	Major Preliminary Semi-final (2nd v 3rd)	Goonellabah 2 defeated Lismore Thistles 1 @ Oakes Oval, Lismore	Goonellabah – Cerys Hawkins, Sam Ireland Lismore Thistles – Matthew Parrish
3rd	Lismore Thistles	18	10	2	6	44	34	32	Minor semi-final	Lismore Thistles 4 defeated Lismore Workers 0 @ Thistles Park, East Lismore	Lismore Thistles – Jakeb Speers, Matthew Parrish (3)
4th	Byron Bay	18	8	6	4	35	22	30	Major semi-final	Richmond Rovers 1 defeated Goonellabah 0 @ Nielson Park, East Lismore	Richmond Rovers – Jonathan See
5th	Lismore Workers	18	8	4	6	43	26	28	Preliminary final	Goonellabah 2 defeated Lismore Thistles 1 @ Weston Park, Goonellabah	Goonellabah – Dylan Rippon, Dave Annetts Lismore Thistles – Brenton Parrish
6th	Alstonville	18	6	2	10	27	38	20	Grand final	Goonellabah 5 defeated Richmond Rovers 0 @ Oakes Oval, Lismore	Goonellabah – Sam Ireland, Cameron Rippon, Matt Dorigo, Dave Annetts, Cerys Hawkins
7th	Pottsville Beach	18	5	4	9	26	44	19			
8th	Casino	18	6	1	11	26	46	19			
9th	Italo Stars	18	5	3	10	20	38	18			
10th	Ballina	18	3	4	11	19	47	13			

=== 2012 – Richmond Rovers win premiership, Lismore Workers win First Cyril Since 2004 ===
Position	Club	Played	Won	Drew	Lost	For	Against	Goal difference	Points	2012 Cyril Mayo Cup	Results & venues	Goalscorers
Premiers	Richmond Rovers	18	14	1	3	62	21	+41	43	Minor Preliminary Semi-final (4th v 5th)	Byron Bay 1 defeated Lismore Thistles 0 @ Byron Recreation Ground	Byron Bay – Aaron Richter-Steers
2nd	Lismore Workers	18	13	3	2	67	19	+48	42	Major Preliminary Semi-final (2nd v 3rd)	Lismore Workers 3 defeated Goonellabah 1 @ Richards Oval, Lismore	Lismore Workers – Max Harlan (2), Wayne Mortimer Goonellabah – Dave Annetts
3rd	Goonellabah	18	12	3	3	44	21	+23	39	Minor semi-final	Goonellabah defeated Byron Bay on penalties (2–2 at full time, 2–2 after extra time) @ Weston Park, Goonellabah	Goonellabah – Batok Ring, Dave Annetts Byron Bay – Aaron Richter-Steers (2 including a penalty)
4th	Byron Bay	18	9	3	6	50	35	+15	30	Major semi-final	Richmond Rovers 2 defeated Lismore Workers 1 @ Nielson Park, East Lismore	Richmond Rovers – Troy Matthews (2) Lismore Workers – Max Harlan
5th	Lismore Thistles	18	9	2	7	44	29	+15	29	Preliminary final	Lismore Workers 5 defeated Goonellabah 4 @ Richards Oval, Lismore	Lismore Workers – Steve Morrissey, Bill Latimer, Jay Keevers, Kurt Walker, Miller Goonellabah – Batok Ring (hat-trick), Dave Annetts (penalty)
6th	Alstonville	18	8	2	8	43	32	+11	26	Grand final	Lismore Workers 3 defeated Richmond Rovers 2 @ Oakes Oval, Lismore	Lismore Workers – Bill Latimer, Max Harlen, Kurt Walker Richmond Rovers – Kurt Brewer-Charles, Troy Matthews
7th	Lennox Head	18	6	2	10	33	51	-18	20			
8th	Italo Stars	18	4	1	13	22	63	-41	13			
9th	Casino	18	3	1	14	19	70	-51	10			
10th	Ballina	18	3	0	15	14	57	-43	9			

=== 2013 – Lismore Thistles win ANZAC Shield-premiership Double ===
Position	Club	Played	Won	Drew	Lost	For	Against	Points	2013 Cyril Mayo Cup	Results & venues	Goalscorers
Premiers	Lismore Thistles	18	13	3	2	43	16	42	Elimination final (4th v 5th)	Richmond Rovers 2 defeated Bangalow 0 @ Nielson Park, East Lismore	Richmond Rovers – Andrew Casagrande, own goal
2nd	Byron Bay	18	12	2	4	72	26	38	Qualifying Final (2nd v 3rd)	Lismore Workers 2 defeated Byron Bay 0 @ Byron Recreation Grounds	Lismore Workers – Wayne Mortimer, Daniel Kelly
3rd	Lismore Workers	18	11	2	5	50	21	35	Minor semi-final	Byron Bay 2 defeated Richmond Rovers 1 @ Byron Recreation Grounds	Byron Bay – Sebastian Bell, Jonathan Pierce Richmond Rovers – Andrew Casagrande
4th	Richmond Rovers	18	10	4	4	56	27	34	Major semi-final	Lismore Thistles defeated Lismore Workers on penalties (0–0 after extra time, 0–0 at full-time) @ Thistles Park, East Lismore	
5th	Bangalow	18	11	0	7	33	22	33	Preliminary final	Byron Bay 3 defeated Lismore Workers 1 @ Byron Recreation Grounds	Byron Bay – James Tomlinson (2), Herrick Schulaman Lismore Workers – Wayne Mortimer
6th	Alstonville	18	9	1	8	54	35	28	Grand final	Byron Bay 2 defeated Lismore Thistles 1 @ Oakes Oval, Lismore	Byron Bay – Sam Owens (2) Lismore Thistles – Matt Weir (penalty)
7th	Lennox Head	18	4	3	11	28	60	15			
8th	Goonellabah	18	4	3	11	31	66	15			
9th	Italo Stars	18	2	4	12	27	75	10			
10th	Casino	18	1	4	13	21	67	7			

=== 2014 – Byron Bay premiership, Richmond Rovers Cyril Mayo Cup ===
Position	Club	Played	Won	Drew	Lost	For	Against	Points	2014 Cyril Mayo Cup	Results & venues	Goalscorers
Premiers	Byron Bay	18	15	0	3	65	15	45	Elimination final (4th v 5th)	Lismore Thistles 1 defeated Alstonville 0 after extra time (0–0 at full-time) @ Thistles Park, East Lismore	Lismore Thistles – Matt Weir (penalty)
2nd	Richmond Rovers	18	14	0	4	66	27	42	Qualifying Final (2nd v 3rd)	Richmond Rovers 1 defeated Lismore Workers @ Nielson Park, East Lismore	Richmond Rovers – Aaron Gray
3rd	Lismore Workers	18	13	2	3	51	25	41	Minor semi-final	Lismore Thistles 2 defeated Lismore Workers 1 @ Richards Oval, Lismore	Lismore Thistles – Matt Weir (2 including a penalty) Lismore Workers – Shaun McDonald
4th	Lismore Thistles	18	12	1	5	46	14	37	Major semi-final	Byron Bay 4 defeated Richmond Rovers 1 @ Byron Recreation Ground	Byron Bay – Kazi Tsukamato, James Tomlinson, Connor Cannon, Herrick Schulaman Richmond Rovers – Russell Dent
5th	Alstonville	18	10	0	8	46	28	30	Preliminary final	Richmond Rovers 2 defeated Lismore Thistles 1 after extra time (1–1 at full-time) @ Nielson Park, East Lismore	Richmond Rovers – Brad Bugden, Josh Scicluna Lismore Thistles – Matt Armstrong
6th	Bangalow	18	8	2	8	33	31	26	Grand final	Richmond Rovers defeated Byron Bay 9–8 on penalties (1–1 after extra time, 1–1 at full-time) @ Oakes Oval, Lismore	Richmond Rovers – Andrew Gray Byron Bay – Kazi Tsukamato
7th	Ballina	18	6	1	11	35	58	19			
8th	Lennox Head	18	5	1	12	26	50	16			
9th	Goonellabah	18	2	0	16	14	65	6			
10th	Tintenbar/East Ballina	18	1	1	16	14	83	4			

=== 2015 – Byron Bay premiership ===
Position	Club	Played	Won	Drew	Lost	For	Against	Points	2015 Cyril Mayo Cup	Results & venues	Goalscorers
Premiers	Byron Bay	18	15	2	1	63	18	47	Elimination final (5th v 6th)	Lennox Head 3 defeated Goonellabah 0 @ Skennars Head Oval, Lennox Head	Lennox Head – Sam Ireland, Byron Milne, Ihsan Savran
2nd	Richmond Rovers	18	12	4	2	49	15	40	Qualifying Final (3rd v 4th)	Richmond Rovers 1 defeated Lismore Workers 0 @ Nielson Park, East Lismore	Richmond Rovers – Scott Flynn
3rd	Lismore Workers	18	9	4	5	42	33	31	Minor semi-final	Lennox Head 2 defeated Lismore Workers 0 @ Richards Oval, Lismore	Lennox Head – Gus McDonnell, Byron Milne
4th	Lennox Head	18	9	4	5	43	37	31	Major semi-final	Byron Bay 2 defeated Richmond Rovers 1 @ Byron Recreation Ground	Byron Bay – Todd Knaus, James Tomlinson Richmond Rovers – Russell Dent
5th	Goonellabah	18	8	4	6	34	23	28	Preliminary final	Richmond Rovers 4 defeated Lennox Head 1 @ Nielson Park, East Lismore	Richmond Rovers – Kurt Walker, Andrew Casagrande, Jake Heffernan, Matthew Olley Lennox Head – Jervis Foley
6th	Lismore Thistles	18	6	4	8	40	35	22	Grand final	Richmond Rovers defeated Byron Bay on penalties (2–2 at full-time, 2–2 after extra time) @ Oakes Oval, Lismore	Richmond Rovers – Bobby Bugden, Kurt Walker Byron Bay – Michael Kelly, James Tomlinson
7th	Alstonville	18	6	4	8	24	31	22			
8th	Casino	18	4	3	11	25	49	15			
9th	Bangalow	18	1	6	11	17	50	9			
10th	Ballina	18	0	5	13	20	66	5			

=== 2016 – Bangalow Wins Their First Title: Cyril Mayo Cup ===
In 1987 in their first and until 2016 only grand final appearance Bangalow were convincingly beaten 4–1 by Richmond Rovers. Bangalow had made the grand final from 4th place, beating Alstonvilla (1–0, Goalscorer – Robert Parks), Ballina (2–0, Goalscorer – Paul Clarke (2)) and Lismore Thistles (1–0, Goalscorer – Robert Parks (penalty)).

In 2016 Bangalow won the Premier Division grand final 1–0 against the premiers Goonellabah, to win their first and so far only title.

==== 2016 – Premier Division final table & Cyril Mayo Cup results & venues ====
Position	Club	Played	Won	Drew	Lost	For	Against	Points	2016 Cyril Mayo Cup	Results & venues	Goalscorers
Premiers	Goonellabah	18	15	1	2	56	24	46	Minor Preliminary Semi-final (4th v 5th)	Byron Bay 2 defeated Lismore Workers 0 @ Byron Recreation Grounds	Byron Bay – Aaron Walker, Quinn McDonald
2nd	Richmond Rovers	18	13	2	3	68	18	41	Major Preliminary Semi-final (2nd v 3rd)	Bangalow 3 defeated Richmond Rovers 1 @ Nielson Park, East Lismore	Bangalow – Daniel Crisante, Bryn Hicks, Rory Devlin Richmond Rovers – Kurt Walker
3rd	Bangalow	18	13	1	4	55	30	40	Minor semi-final	Richmond Rovers 2 defeated Byron Bay 0 @ Nielson Park, East Lismore	Richmond Rovers – Andrew Gray, Russell Dent (penalty)
4th	Byron Bay	18	12	2	4	61	16	38	Major semi-final	Goonellabah 1 defeated Bangalow 1 on penalties (1–1 after extra-time, 1–1 at full-time) @ Weston Park, Goonellabah	Goonellabah – Lloyd Howard Bangalow – Joel Rudgley
5th	Lismore Workers	18	10	2	6	45	36	32	Preliminary final	Bangalow 2 defeated Richmond Rovers 1 @ Nielson Park, East Lismore	Bangalow – Rory Devlin, own goal Richmond Rovers – Jake Heffernan
6th	Lismore Thistles	18	8	1	9	34	34	25	Grand final	Bangalow 1 defeated Goonellabah 0 @ Oakes Oval, Lismore	Bangalow – Rory Devlin
7th	Casino	18	4	2	12	27	56	14			
8th	Alstonville	18	3	2	13	17	38	11			
9th	Italo Stars	18	2	2	14	17	55	8			
10th	Lennox Head	18	2	1	15	18	91	7			

=== 2017 – Byron Bay wins the treble and South Lismore win 1st Division double ===
In 2017 Byron Bay won its first ever treble (ANZAC Shield, premiership & Cyril Mayo Cup) and in doing so became the 8th team to achieve the feat.

In April Byron Bay won the ANZAC Shield beating Richmond Rovers 2–1 in the final at Oakes Oval. Aaron Walker scored both goals for Byron Bay before being sent-off in the 89th minute, whilst Kurt Walker scored for Richmond Rovers in the 65th minute. Joel Wood of Byron Bay was named player of the match.

Byron Bay won the premiership by 2 points from Richmond Rovers, losing only once during the season, a round 17 home loss to Richmond Rovers 1–2. This defeat meant that Byron Bay had to win their final fixture away to Alstonville to secure the premiership. A 5–2 win ensured Byron Bay's 4th premiership.

The Cyril Mayo Cup (grand final) between Byron Bay and defending champions Bangalow was history-making, being contested for the first time ever by 2 clubs from the Byron Shire. It was also the first time since 2001 that both grand finalists were from outside Lismore (in 2001 Maclean defeated Byron Bay in the Cyril Mayo Cup final). And for the first time since 2009 when the grand final was played at Crozier Field; the grand final wasn't played at Oakes Oval due to refurbishments. The game was played at Lismore Workers' home ground, Richards Oval in Lismore. A 10-man Byron Bay won the grand final 2–1 after Ben Ahearn was sent off in the 16th minute and extra time thanks to a double by player-of-the match Joel Wood.

Position	Club	Played	Won	Drawn	Lost	For	Against	Points	2017 Finals	Results & venues	Goalscorers
Premiers	Byron Bay	18	17	0	1	93	15	51	Elimination final (4th v 5th)	Goonellabah 5 defeated Lismore Thistles 4 after extra time (3–3 at full-time) @ Weston Park, Goonellabah	Goonellabah – Kaiden Powell (3 including a penalty), Wayne Gordon, Lloyd Howard Lismore Thistles – Oscar Stahl, Nathan McCann, Chris Hunt, Max Hospers
2nd	Richmond Rovers	18	16	1	1	76	23	49	Qualifying Final (2nd v 3rd)	Bangalow 2 defeated Richmond Rovers 0 @ Nielson Park, East Lismore	Bangalow – Rory Devlin, Luke Wakefield
3rd	Bangalow	18	13	1	4	47	30	40	Minor semi-final	Richmond Rovers 4 defeated Goonellabah 1 @ Nielson Park, East Lismore	Richmond Rovers – Luke McWaide (2), Jonathan See, Kurt Walker Goonellabah – Kurt Stephens
4th	Goonellabah	18	9	2	7	54	34	29	Major semi-final	Byron Bay 3 defeated Bangalow 1 @ Byron Recreation Grounds	Byron Bay – Gianluca Bongiovanni, Sam Owens, Joel Wood Bangalow – Scott Fuller
5th	Lismore Thistles	18	7	1	10	42	44	22	Preliminary final	Bangalow 3 defeated Richmond Rovers 1 @ Nielson Park, East Lismore	Bangalow – Dayne Smith, Josh Cole, Sam Ireland Richmond Rovers – Kurt Walker
6th	Alstonville	18	6	0	12	31	49	18	Grand final	Byron Bay 2 defeated Bangalow 1 after extra time (1–1 at full-time) @ Recreation Ground Number 12, Richards Oval, Lismore	Byron Bay – Joel Wood (2) Bangalow – Sam Ireland
7th	Lennox Head	18	5	1	12	37	55	16			
8th	Casino	18	5	1	12	27	74	16			
9th	Lismore Workers	18	3	3	12	22	69	12			
10th	Italo Stars	18	3	2	13	29	62	11			

South Lismore were promoted to the 2018 Premier Division after winning the 2017 1st Division premiership by beating Ballina 3–1 at Saunders Oval, Ballina in the final fixture of the season. Going into that final fixture Ballina led South Lismore by 2 points and draw or win would have been enough for Ballina to be promoted. However goals by Kaine Allan (2) and Steve Morrissey in response to a Ben Coulter goal for Ballina gave South Lismore the win and the premiership. South Lismore won the premiership-grand final double by beating Shores United 3–1 in the grand final. South Lismore would be playing in the top division of FFNC competitions for the first time since 2002. South Lismore's 1st Division double was a triumph for their young coach, Cameron Hyde, who overcame a cancer diagnosis to guide his young team back into the Premier Division.

=== 2018 – Lismore Workers & Italo Stars Depart the Premier Division ===
The 2018 season began with the sad realisation that the 2 most successful clubs in FFNC history, Lismore Workers and Italo Stars, would not be competing in Premier Division. Italo Stars were relegated to 1st Division after coming bottom in the 2017 Premier Division competition whilst Lismore Workers voluntarily opted to play in the men's lower divisions. Between them Lismore Workers (46 titles, 28 as Eastwood United and 18 as Lismore Workers) and Italo Stars (33 titles) have won 79 titles. Lismore Workers dropped 5 divisions to Division 5 whilst Italo Stars went back 1 division to 1st Division.

South Lismore returned to the Premier Division in 2018 after a 16-year absence after winning the 2017 1st Division premiership-grand final double. With the return of South Lismore, the self-demotion of Lismore Workers and the relegation of Italo Stars, the 2018 Premier Division competition has 9 clubs, a change from the tradition of 10 or even 12 clubs.

In April Lismore Thistles won their 3rd ANZAC Cup in 6 years and their 8th overall, beating Bangalow 3–0 at Crozier Field. Goalscorers were Oscar Stahl, Nick Albertini and Jye Wilson, with Stahl being named player of the match

In May Byron Bay announced that Byron Bay Council had approved its plans for a new clubhouse at its "spiritual home", Byron Recreation Grounds, with the clubhouse expected to be completed in 2019.

In July Richmond Rovers defeated Lennox Head 5–0 away and in doing so wrapped up their 9th premiership with 4 games to play in the 16-game home and away season.

==== 2018 Premier Division – final table & Cyril Mayo Cup results ====
Position	Club	Played	Won	Drew	Lost	For	Against	Points	2018 Cyril Mayo Cup	Results & venues	Goalscorers
Premiers	Richmond Rovers	16	13	2	1	54	16	41	Elimination final (4th v 5th)	Bangalow 3 defeated Lismore Thistles 0 @ Bangalow Recreation Ground	Bangalow – Sam Ireland (2), Luke Wakefield
2nd	Byron Bay	16	8	5	3	39	21	29	Qualifying Final (2nd v 3rd)	Byron Bay 1 defeated South Lismore 0 after extra time (0–0 at full-time) @ Byron Recreation Ground	Byron Bay – Matt Pike
3rd	South Lismore	16	7	6	3	30	19	27	Minor semi-final	South Lismore 2 defeated Bangalow 1 @ Caniaba Street, South Lismore	South Lismore – Bob Mullenberg, Joel Goulding Bangalow –
4th	Bangalow	16	7	1	8	26	25	22	Major semi-final	Richmond Rovers 2 defeated Byron Bay 0 @ Nielson Park, East Lismore	Richmond Rovers – Jaiden Walker, Brad Bugden
5th	Lismore Thistles	16	5	5	6	32	28	20	Preliminary final	Byron Bay 2 defeated South Lismore 0 @ Byron Recreation Ground	Byron Bay – Matt Pike, Ethan Archer
6th	Alstonville	16	5	4	7	27	28	19	Grand final	Byron Bay 2 defeated Richmond Rovers 1 after extra time (1–1 at full-time) @ Crozier Field, Lismore	Byron Bay – Jonathan Pierce (2) Richmond Rovers – Brad Bugden
7th	Goonellabah	16	4	5	7	18	20	17			
8th	Lennox Head	16	4	2	10	20	47	14			
9th	Casino	16	3	2	11	19	61	11			

== 2019 – Bangalow win First ANZAC Cup, Byron Bay win premiership & South Lismore Break 26 Year Trophy Drought ==
In April Bangalow won their first ANZAC Cup when they defeated Byron Bay 2–1 after extra time at Crozier Field, Lismore. This was their second trophy in FFNC history following their 2016 Cyril Mayo Cup triumph. Sam Ireland scored the winner for Bangalow in extra time after it was 1–1 at full-time. Goalscorers during normal time were Byron Milne for Bangalow and Ian McKellow for Byron Bay.

The 2019 Premier Division competition kicked off with just 8 clubs including a promoted Ballina which was found to be uncompetitive, losing all 21 games. Byron Bay won their 5th premiership at Nielson Park, East Lismore on a Wednesday night in August when they thrashed a disappointing Richmond Rovers 5–0 in a catch-up game. Byron Bay came from 2nd last after 5 rounds to win their 4th premiership in 6 seasons, winning 14 and losing just 2 of their final 16 fixtures.

South Lismore came second in the premiership but made amends by winning the Cyril Mayo Cup for the first time since their premiership-Cyril Mayo Cup double in 1993. South Lismore defeated premiers Byron Bay 2–1 with Noah Coleman scoring twice for South Lismore and winning the Terry Greedy medal for the player of the match. The grand final marked the end of an era with Damon Bell, the Byron Bay coach announcing his retirement during grand final week. During Bell's highly-successful 7-year reign Byron Bay won:

- 4 Premier League premierships
- 3 Cyril Mayo Cups (for winning the grand final)
- 1 ANZAC Cup
- the treble (ANZAC Cup, premiership and Cyril Mayo Cup (grand final)) in 2018

In August FFNC flagged changes to the structure of senior competitions in 2020 aimed at re-invigorating and removing constraints at the top levels:

- Men's Premier Division to be re-branded as Men's Premier League
- Women's Premier Division to be re-branded as Women's Premier League
- Men's Premier Reserves to be re-branded as the Championship League

The 2020 Men's Premier League will have 9 teams including the yet to be confirmed return of Maclean.

=== 2019 – Premier Division Final Table & Cyril Mayo Cup ===
Position	Club	Played	Won	Drew	Lost	For	Against	Goal difference	Points	2019 Cyril Mayo Cup	Results & venues	Goalscorers
Premiers	Byron Bay	21	15	1	5	64	24	+40	46	Elimination final (4th v 5th)	Lismore Thistles defeated Bangalow 7–6 on penalties (0–0 at full-time, 0–0 after extra time) @ Jeff Schultz Field, Bangalow Recreation Ground	
2nd	South Lismore	21	10	7	4	62	31	+31	37	Qualifying Final (2nd v 3rd)	South Lismore 4 defeated Richmond Rovers 1 @ Caniaba Street, South Lismore	South Lismore – Patrick Kable (2), Harry Armstrong, Murray Towner Richmond Rovers – own goal
3rd	Richmond Rovers	21	11	4	6	43	32	+11	37	Minor semi-final	Lismore Thistles defeated Richmond Rovers on penalties (1–1 after extra time) @ Nielson Park, East Lismore	Lismore Thistles – Kaleb Gooley Richmond Rovers – Jacob Heffernan
4th	Bangalow	21	11	1	9	40	27	+13	34	Major semi-final	South Lismore defeated Byron Bay 4–2 on penalties (3–3 at full-time, 3–3 after extra time) @ Byron Recreation Grounds	South Lismore – Bob Mullenberg, Murray Towner, Patrick Kable Byron Bay – Rick Muir (2), Ben Ahern
5th	Lismore Thistles	21	10	4	7	37	40	-3	34	Preliminary final	Byron Bay 2 defeated Lismore Thistles 1 after extra time (1–1 at full-time) @ Byron Recreation Grounds	Byron Bay – Lisandro Luaces, Jonathan Pierce (penalty) Lismore Thistles – Matt Parrish (penalty)
6th	Goonellabah	21	8	3	10	33	35	-2	27	Grand final	South Lismore 2 defeated Byron Bay 1 @ Crozier Field, Lismore	South Lismore – Noah Coleman (2) Byron Bay – Lisandro Luaces (penalty)
7th	Alstonville	21	7	4	10	30	40	-10	25			
8th	Ballina	21	0	0	21	8	88	-80	0			

== Trophies ==
=== ANZAC Cup (from 1950-1971), ANZAC Shield (from 1972) ===
The first ANZAC Cup was played on Tuesday night 25 April 1950 as part of the ANZAC Day Sports Carnival. This carnival featured athletics, cycling, woodchopping, national dancing, rugby league and soccer. The ANZAC Cup was donated in 1949 by the Lismore RSL.

The inaugural ANZAC Cup kicked off at 8-30pm between Methodist United and North Lismore Marauders. In an "evenly contested" game played under "inadequate lighting" Methodist United won 1 – 0 thanks to a goal by M Bell. The teams and officials for the inaugural ANZAC Cup were:

- Methodist United – M Santin (Goalkeeper), R Hill, K Stevenson, L Morley (?), Stan Pendrigh, George Chalmers (Captain-Coach), Fryer, M Bell, H Forster, Jack Dalmeyer, G Barnes
- North Lismore Marauders – E Morgan (Goalkeeper), G Rogers (Captain), L Bryant, J Brady, Ossie Pomroy, H McDonald, J Docherty, Bill Driver, Bill Woolnough, R Bowen & K Matteson. Reserves – A Wakley, A Parker, G Kennedy, A Woolnough, A Manitta
- Referee – Clarrie Richards
- Linesmen – Jim Gooch, Charlie Thompson

In the early years the Cup was played between the Cup holders and a challenger decided by ballot. The Cup holders only had to draw to retain the Cup. For example, in 1951 the Cup holders Methodist United drew 3–3 all with the challengers Eastwood United, and retained the Cup. The date of the Cup also varied in the early years due to "inadequate lighting facilities" although it's now played on ANZAC Day or the weekend before or after ANZAC Day and usually at Oakes Oval, Lismore.

The record for the most ANZAC Cup wins is held by Lismore Workers with 19 (including 9 as Eastwood United). However, the record for the most consecutive wins is held by Italo Stars which won the renamed ANZAC Shield for 9 consecutive years from 1973 to 1981 including 6 wins over the luckless Eastwood United:

- 1973 at Oakes Oval – Italo Stars 3 (Andy Stevens, Gordon Bryant, Kevin Watts) – Eastwood United 0
- 1974 at Nielson Park – Italo Stars 1 (Mick Stevens) – Lismore Thistles 0
- 1975 at Oakes Oval – Italo Stars 0 – Eastwood United 0 (Italo Stars retained the Shield as holders)
- 1976 at Oakes Oval – Italo Stars 4 (scorers unknown) – Eastwood United 0
- 1977 at Nielson Park – Italo Stars 3 (Gary Northcote, Greg Sharpe (2)) – Eastwood United 1 (Gerrard Pollard)
- 1978 at Oakes Oval – Italo Stars 1 (Peter Jenson) – Goonellabah 0
- 1979 at Oakes Oval – Italo Stars 3 (Rod Dargie, John Essex (2)) – Goonellabah 3 (Ian McDonald, Rodney Eather, Steven Hapgood) (Italo Stars retained the Shield as holders)
- 1980 at Oakes Oval – Italo Stars 2 – Eastwood United 2 (Italo Stars retained the Shield as holders)
- 1981 at Oakes Oval – Italo Stars 3 – Eastwood United 1

Special mention to the powerful Goonellabah Stars side of the 1950s which won their first ANZAC Cup in 1952 and then won it for the next 5 years:

- 1952 at Recreation Ground Number 3 – Goonellabah Stars 4 (K Packham (2), R McDermott (2)) – Methodist United 2 (R Hill, J Parker)
- 1953 at Oakes Oval – Goonellabah Stars 4 (R McDermott, B McPherson (2), J Teale) – Church of Christ Crusaders 0
- 1954 at Nielson Park – Goonellabah Stars 7 (N Manitta (3), J Wraight (2), R Minarelli, K McDermott) – Methodist United 1 (M Marsh)
- 1955 at Oakes Oval – Goonellabah Stars 5 (Nino Manitta, Ben Neilson (2), Ken Eastment (2)) – Church of Christ Crusaders 2 (Ross Reid, Warren Taber)
- 1956 at Oakes Oval – Goonellabah Stars 3 (Ben Nielson (2 including a penalty), Pomfret) – Eastwood United 1 (Hodgkinson)
- 1957 at Recreation Ground Number 10 – Goonellabah Stars defeated Internationals (No details available)

=== Cyril Mayo Cup (from 1958) ===
Cyril Mayo emigrated from England as a 17-year-old in the early 1900s and settled in the North Rivers region. Cyril was a competent player for North Lismore and after his playing days took up refereeing.

Cyril was killed in a car crash in 1957. Cyril's wife Lucy commissioned a trophy to remember Cyril's contribution to the game, the Cyril Mayo Cup which has "become the most sought after piece of silverware in local soccer". The cup is awarded to the highest Men's Division grand final winner's also known as Champions. It was first awarded in 1958 to Goonellabah Stars following their 1 – 0 win over Eastwood United at Oakes Oval, Lismore. Ben Nielson was Goonellabah Star's goalscorer.

The cup was originally called the Cyril Mayo Memorial Challenge Cup but in more recent times has been referred to simply and affectionately as "Cyril".

==== Most Consecutive Cyril Mayo Cup Wins ====
The record for the most number of consecutive Cyril Mayo Cup wins is 5 and is jointly held by:

- Lismore Thistles – 1970, 1971, 1972, 1973, 1974
- Italo Stars – 1977, 1978, 1979, 1980, 1981

=== Callan McMillan Memorial Shield (from 1978) ===
In 1972 a young Scotsman Callan McMillan Junior left the country of his birth headed for Australia where he eventually settled in Lismore. An avid Glasgow Rangers supporter, Callan was soon involved in local football as a coach and member of the inaugural Far North Coast Amateur Soccer Association Committee in 1977.

Tragedy struck in December 1977 when Callan Junior drowned whilst trying to save a young girl. The local football community rallied to support Callan's family, and in 1978 the Callan McMillan Memorial Shield was struck to commemorate his contribution to the local game. The shield was presented to the winner of the women's knock-out competition.

In 1996 when the North Coast Women's Soccer Association and the Lismore District Soccer Association amalgamated, it was agreed that the shield be incorporated with the men's ANZAC Cup/Shield knockout competition held on ANZAC day.

== FFNC Clubs ==
The following clubs are affiliated with Football Far North Coast:

Club	Date/Year of Formation	Nickname(s)	Home Ground
Alstonville	1987 following the merger of Alstonville Junior Soccer Club (formed in 1972) and Alstonville Senior Soccer Club (formed in 1980)	Alstonvilla, Villa	Crawford Park (Seniors) & Geoff Watt Oval (Juniors), Alstonville
Ballina	1971	Seahorses	Saunders Oval, Ballina
Bangalow	1970	The Bluedogs	Bangalow Recreation Ground
Burringbar	1992	The Bandits	Burringbar District Sports Club, Fourth Avenue
Byron Bay	1963 (juniors), 1966 (seniors), 1982 (joined the Lismore District Soccer Association)	The Rams	Byron Recreation Grounds
Casino	1933	The Cobras	Colley Park, Casino
Dunoon	1994	United	Balzer Park, Dunoon Sports Club
Eureka	2012	The Biggest Little Club in NSW	Eureka Public School
Goonellabah	21 June 1969	The Hornets	Weston Park, Goonellabah
Italo Stars	1966 (as a breakaway club from Goonellabah Stars and originally called Italo Australia Stars)	Stars	Lismore Italo-Australian Sports & Recreation Club, Barrow Lane, Lismore
Kyogle	To be advised	The Turkeys	Don Gully Oval, Kyogle
Lennox Head	1978 (juniors), 1979 (seniors)	The Sharks	Skennars Head Oval, Lennox Head
Richmond Rovers	1961	Rovers	Bill Harris Field, Nielson Park, East Lismore
Lismore Thistles	31 January 1958	The Blues	John Ryan Field, Thistles Park, East Lismore
Lismore Workers	1949 as Eastwood United, 1985 as Lismore Workers	The Redmen	Recreation Ground Number 12, Richards Oval, Lismore
Nimbin	1985	The Headers	Nimbin Headers Sports Club, Cecil Street, Nimbin
Pottsville Beach	1994	The Panthers	Koala Beach Sports Fields, Tom Merchant Drive, Pottsville Beach
Shores United	1968	The Brownsnakes, The Redbacks	New Brighton Oval, Park Street, New Brighton & Shara Fields, Ocean Shores
South Lismore	1946	The Celtics, The Hoops	Caniaba Street, South Lismore
Suffolk Park	2012	The Phoenix	Beech Drive, Suffolk Park
TEBFC (Tintenbar East Ballina Football Club)	1984	The Strikers	Tintenbar Grounds, Power Drive, Cumbalum
Tumbulgum	1959 after the Murwillumbah Rangers re-located to Tumbulgum	Rangers	Brian Breckenridge Field, Bawden Street, Tumbulgum
Uki	1994	The Pythons	Uki Sports Ground, Kyogle Road, Uki
Woodburn	1 March 1982	Wolves	Woodburn Park, Wagner Street, Woodburn

- Alstonville FC
- Ballina Seahorses
- Bangalow Bluedogs
- Brunswick Heads Football Club
- Burringbar
- Byron Bay Rams
- Casino Cobras
- Dunoon
- Eureka
- Goonellabah Hornets
- Italo Stars (Lismore)
- Kyogle
- Lennox Head Sharks
- Richmond Rovers
- Lismore Thistles
- Lismore Workers
- Mullumbimby Brunswick
- Nimbin Headers
- Pottsville Beach Panthers FC
- Shores United
- South Lismore Celtic
- Suffolk Park
- Tintenbar/East Ballina
- Tumbulgum Rangers
- Uki Pythons
- Woodburn Wolves

=== Former FFNC Clubs ===
The following teams were once part of competitions organised by Football Far North Coast and its predecessors:

- Kingscliff (moved to the Gold Coast Football League)
- Maclean Bobcats (moved to the Mid North Coast Football League)
- Murwillumbah Saints (moved to the Gold Coast Football League)
- Tweed Heads
- Goonellabah Stars – in existence from 1949 to 1965. A separate club to Italian-Australian Stars (now Italo Stars) which was formed in 1966.
- Goolmangar
- Dungarubba
- Woodlawn College
- Coraki
- Evans Head
- Bonalbo
- Southern Cross University
- Methodist United OK (Order of the Knights)
- North Lismore Marauders
- Tyalgum Taipans

== Honours – women ==
Season	1st Division champions	1st Division grand final score	1st Division premiers	2nd Division champions	2nd Division grand final score	2nd Division premiers	Callan McMillan Shield (A Division)	Player of the year	Golden boot
1978			Richmond Rovers A			Richmond Rovers B			
1979									
1980	Richmond Rovers	Richmond Rovers 4 – Eastwood United 0	Richmond Rovers			Ballina			
1981									
1982	Lismore Thistles	Lismore Thistles 5 – Ballina 2	Lismore Thistles	Alstonville	Alstonville 3 Richmond Rovers Wanderers 1	Alstonville			
1983									
1984	Richmond Rovers (A)	Richmond Rovers (A) 3 – Byron Bay 2	Richmond Rovers (A)						
1985									
1986									
1987			Byron Bay			Mullumbimby			
1988									
1989									
1990	Richmond Rovers	Richmond Rovers 1 – Woodburn 0	Richmond Rovers	Richmond Rovers	Richmond Rovers 0 – Casino 0, Richmond Rovers won 2–1 on penalties	Casino			
1991	Goonellabah	Goonellabah 2 – Woodburn 1	Woodburn tbc	Woodburn	Woodburn B 3 – Woodburn C 0				
1992	Woodburn	Woodburn 1 – Nimbin 0 after extra time	Maclean	Ballina	Ballina 2 – Woodburn 0	Ballina			
1993	Nimbin Headers	Nimbin Headers 1 – Richmond Rovers 0 after extra time	Richmond Rovers	Lismore Thistles Blue	Lismore Thistles Blue 2 – University of New England, Northern Rivers 0	Lismore Thistles Blue			
1994	Nimbin United & Richmond Rovers (joint Champions)	First grand final: Nimbin United 0 – Richmond Rovers 0, Replay: Nimbin United 0 – Richmond Rovers 0	Woodburn	Goonellabah	Goonellabah 2 – Woodburn 0	Goonellabah			
1995	Nimbin United	Nimbin United 3 – Richmond Rovers 1	Nimbin United			Casino			
1996	Lismore Thistles	Lismore Thistles 2 – Nimbin 1	Maclean	Lismore Workers	Lismore Workers 2 – Southern Cross University Blue 1	Southern Cross University Blue	Lismore Thistles	Tracy Want (Maclean)	Tracy Want (Maclean)
1997	Richmond Rovers	Richmond Rovers 2 – Lismore Thistles 1	Richmond Rovers	Casino	Casino 2 – Lismore Workers 0	Casino	Maclean	Martene Edwards (Richmond Rovers)	Cass Thorman (Richmond Rovers) – 23 goals
1998	Lismore Thistles	Lismore Thistles 3 – Maclean 2 by golden goal in extra time (2 – 2 at full-time)	Lismore Thistles	Tintenbar	Tintenbar 1 – Byron Bay 1 after extra time, Tintenbar won 5 – 4 on penalties	Byron Bay	Richmond Rovers	Natalie Anderson (Maclean)	Tracy Want (Maclean)
1999	Lismore Thistles	Lismore Thistles 3 – Maclean 2	Richmond Rovers	Byron Bay	Byron Bay 4 – Southern Cross University 1	Southern Cross University		Ashley Wilson (Goonellabah)	Martene Edwards (Richmond Rovers)
2000	Southern Cross University	Southern Cross University 1 – Richmond Rovers 1 on penalties after extra time	Richmond Rovers	Casino	Casino 1 – Richmond Rovers 0	Casino	Byron Bay	Hayley McAnelly (Richmond Rovers)	Martene Edwards (Richmond Rovers)
2001	Lismore Workers	Lismore Workers 1 – Richmond Rovers 0	Lismore Workers	Lismore Workers	Lismore Workers 2 – Lismore Thistles 1 in golden goal extra time	Lismore Workers	Tweed Heads		
2002	Lismore Workers		Lismore Workers			Lennox Head	Lismore Workers	Martene Edwards (Richmond Rovers)	Martene Edwards (Richmond Rovers)
2003			Lismore Workers			Alstonville	Richmond Rovers	Katie Parker (Richmond Rovers)	Katie Parker (Richmond Rovers)
2004			Richmond Rovers				Richmond Rovers	Felicity Kerslake (Southern Cross University)	Rose Argent (Byron Bay)
2005	Lismore Workers	Lismore Workers 2 – Ballina 0	Lismore Workers	Alstonville	Alstonville 4 – Lismore Workers 1		Lismore Workers	Renee McIntosh (Richmond Rovers)	Renee McIntosh (Richmond Rovers) – 28 goals
2006	Richmond Rovers	Richmond Rovers 4 – Lismore Workers 1		Italo Stars	Italo Stars 3 – Lennox Head 1		Byron Bay	Martene Edwards (Richmond Rovers)	Martene Edwards (Richmond Rovers)
2007	Lennox Head	Lennox Head 2 – Lismore Workers 1	Lennox Head	Alstonville	Alstonville 2 – Lismore Thistles 1	Alstonville	Byron Bay	Gypsy Hechtl (Lismore Workers)	Abigail Allardyce (Lennox Head) – 36 goals
2008	Lennox Head	Lennox Head 6 – Richmond Rovers 1	Lennox Head	Tumbulgum		Woodburn	Lennox Head	Shelley West-Watts (Lismore Thistles)	Chelsea Coleman (Lennox Head)
2009	Italo Stars	Italo Stars 4 – Bangalow 1	Italo Stars	Tumbulgum	Tumbulgum 2 – Goonellabah 2 after extra time, Tumbulgum won on penalties	Goonellabah	Richmond Rovers	Martene Wallace (Italo Stars)	Hollie Jarrett (Bangalow) & Martene Wallace (Italo Stars) – 23 goals
2010	Alstonville	Alstonville 3 – Richmond Rovers 1	Alstonville	Casino	Casino 3 – Byron Bay 1	Casino	Alstonville	Sarah Flower (Richmond Rovers)	Chelsea Coleman (Alstonville) – 28 goals
2011	Alstonville	Alstonville 3 – Bangalow 0	Alstonville	Lennox Head	Lennox Head defeated Ballina on penalties after extra time	Ballina	Alstonville	Tenneille Shaw (Bangalow) & Abbie Heffernan (Richmond Rovers)	Chelsea Coleman (Alstonville) & Hollie Jarrett (Bangalow) – 25 goals
Season	Premier Division champions	Premier Division grand final score	Premier Division premiers	2nd Division champions	2nd Division grand final score	2nd Division premiers	Callan McMillan Shield (A Division)	Player of the year	Golden boot
2012	Alstonville	Alstonville 4 – Lismore Thistles 1	Alstonville	Italo Stars	Italo Stars 4 – Lennox Head 2	Casino	Alstonville	Hollie Jarrett (Bangalow)	Jade Bianchetti (Bangalow) – 23 goals
2013	Bangalow	Bangalow 3 – Alstonville 0	Bangalow	Casino	Casino 4 – Lennox Head 1	Lennox Head	Alstonville	Jade Bianchetti (Bangalow)	Jade Bianchetti (Bangalow) – 28 goals
2014	Bangalow	Bangalow 4 – Alstonville 0	Bangalow	Mullumbimby Brunswick Valley	Mullumbimby Brunswick Valley 5 – Woodburn 1	Mullumbimby Brunswick Valley	Bangalow	Jade Bianchetti (Bangalow)	Jade Bianchetti (Bangalow) – 40 goals
2015	Bangalow	Bangalow 4 – Alstonville 0	Bangalow	Lismore Thistles	Lismore Thistles 2 – Woodburn 1	Woodburn	Bangalow	Jade Bianchetti (Bangalow)	Jade Bianchetti (Bangalow) – 40 goals
2016	Bangalow	Bangalow 2 – Lismore Thistles 0	Bangalow	Pottsville	Pottsville 1 – Goonellabah 0	Goonellabah	Bangalow	Hollie Jarrett (Bangalow)	Hollie Jarrett (Bangalow) – 21 goals
2017	Lismore Thistles	Lismore Thistles 1 – Bangalow 0	Lismore Thistles	Mullumbimby Brunswick Valley	Mullumbimby Brunswick Valley 3 – Lismore Workers 2	Mullumbimby Brunswick Valley	Bangalow	Hollie Jarrett (Bangalow)	Hollie Jarrett (Bangalow) – 19 goals
2018	Lismore Thistles	Lismore Thistles 2 – Byron Bay 1 after extra time	Lismore Thistles	Richmond Rovers	Richmond Rovers 2 – Casino 0	Goonellabah	Lismore Thistles	Keea Parrish (Lismore Thistles)	Stephanie Foreman (Mullumbimby Brunswick Valley)
2019	Lennox Head	Lennox Head 4 – Alstonville 0	Lismore Thistles	No competition	No competition	No competition	Lismore Thistles	Elsa Mangan (Lismore Thistles)	Olivia Collins (Lismore Thistles) – 17 goals
2020	Lennox Head	Lennox Head defeated Alstonville	Alstonville				Alstonville		Deeanna Thompson (Lennox Head) – 15 goals
2021	Not played	Not played	Byron Bay	Not played	Not played	Shores United	Byron Bay	Ruby Smith (Byron Bay)	Charlotte Voss (Alstonville) – 12 goals

== Honours – men ==
Season	Champions	Premiers	Championship League champions	Championship League premiers	First Division champions	First Division premiers	ANZAC Cup (Premier Division)	Player of the year	Golden boot	Summer Youth League
1949	Lismore City									
1950	Casino (1st)	Methodist United (1st)					Methodist United (1st)			
1951	North Lismore Marauders (1st)	Goonellabah Stars (1st)					Methodist United (2nd)			
1952	Eastwood United (1st)	Goonellabah Stars (2nd)					Goonellabah Stars (1st)			
1953	Eastwood United (2nd)	Goonellabah Stars (3rd)					Goonellabah Stars (2nd)			
1954	Goonellabah Stars (1st)	Eastwood United (1st)					Goonellabah Stars (3rd)			
1955	Goonellabah Stars (2nd)	Goonellabah Stars (4th)					Goonellabah Stars (4th)			
1956	Goonellabah Stars (3rd)	Eastwood United (2nd)					Goonellabah Stars (5th)			
1957	Eastwood United (3rd)	Goonellabah Stars (5th)					Goonellabah Stars (6th)			
1958	Goonellabah Stars (4th)	Goonellabah Stars (6th)					Eastwood United (1st)			
1959	Goonellabah Stars (5th)	Eastwood United (3rd)					Eastwood United (2nd)			
1960	Goonellabah Stars (6th)	Goonellabah Stars (7th)					Goonellabah Stars (7th)			
1961	Eastwood United (4th)	Lismore Thistles (1st)					Lismore Thistles (1st)			
1962	Goonellabah Stars (7th)	Goonellabah Stars (8th)					Lismore Thistles (2nd)			
1963	Lismore Thistles (1st)	Goonellabah Stars (9th)					Goonellabah Stars (8th)			
1964	Richmond Rovers (1st)	Goonellabah Stars (10th)					Goonellabah Stars (9th)			
1965	Eastwood United (5th)	Eastwood United (4th)					Richmond Rovers (1st)			
1966	Eastwood United (6th)	Lismore Thistles No 1 (2nd)					Eastwood United (3rd)			
1967	Eastwood United (7th)	Lismore Thistles White (3rd)					Eastwood United (4th)			
1968	Italo Stars (1st)	Lismore Thistles Civics (4th)					Eastwood United (5th)			
1969	Italo Stars (2nd)	Eastwood United (5th)					Eastwood United (6th)			
1970	Lismore Thistles (2nd)	Eastwood United (6th)					Lismore Thistles (3rd)			
1971	Lismore Thistles (3rd)	Eastwood United (7th)			Lismore Thistles B	Lismore Thistles B	Eastwood United (7th)			
1972	Lismore Thistles (4th)	Italo Stars (1st)			Italo Stars	Lismore Thistles Colts	Eastwood United (8th)			
1973	Lismore Thistles (5th)	Lismore Thistles (5th)			Lismore Thistles		Italo Stars (1st)			
1974	Lismore Thistles (6th)	Italo Stars (2nd)			Nimbin	College of Advanced Education	Italo Stars (2nd)			
1975	Richmond Rovers (2nd)	Richmond Rovers (1st)			Richmond Rovers		Italo Stars (3rd)			
1976	Lismore Thistles (7th)	Italo Stars (3rd)			Eastwood City	Lismore Thistles Civics	Italo Stars (4th)			
1977	Italo Stars (3rd)	Italo Stars (4th) (Undefeated)			Lismore Thistles Civics	Lismore Thistles Civics	Italo Stars (5th)			
1978	Italo Stars (4th)	Italo Stars (5th)			Lismore Thistles Civics	Lismore Thistles Civics	Italo Stars (6th)			
1979	Italo Stars (5th)	Eastwood United (8th)			South Lismore	Ballina	Italo Stars (7th)			
1980	Italo Stars (6th)	Lismore Thistles (6th)			Casino	Lismore Thistles	Italo Stars (8th)			
1981	Italo Stars (7th)	Eastwood United (9th)			Nimbin	Lismore Thistles Civics	Italo Stars (9th)	Terry Woods (Lismore Thistles)		
1982	Lismore Thistles (8th)	Eastwood United (10th)			Nimbin	Casino	Eastwood United (9th)	Tony Roder (Lismore Thistles)		
1983	Eastwood United (8th)	Goonellabah (1st)			Bangalow	Bangalow	Goonellabah (1st)	Ken McPherson (Eastwood United)		
1984	Eastwood United (9th)	Souths Stars United (1st)			Dungarubba	Dungarubba	Souths Stars United (1st)	Brett Towner (South Lismore)	Kevin Wilson (South Stars United)	
1985	Lismore Thistles (9th)	Lismore Thistles (7th) (Undefeated)			Northern Rivers College of Advanced Education	Northern Rivers College of Advanced Education	South Stars United (2nd)	Glenn Weir (Alstonvilla)	Jeff Edwards (Lismore Thistles)	
1986	Richmond Rovers (3rd)	Richmond Rovers (2nd)			Northern Rivers College of Advanced Education	Northern Rivers College of Advanced Education	Italo Stars (10th)			
1987	Richmond Rovers (4th)	Lismore Thistles (8th)			Richmond Rovers	Lismore Thistles	Italo Stars (11th)		Steve Morrissey (Lismore Thistles)	
1988	Italo Stars (8th)	Italo Stars (6th)			Maclean	Lismore Thistles	Lismore Thistles (4th)		Brett Towner (South Lismore)	
1989	Lismore Workers (10th)	Lismore Workers (11th)			Goonellabah	Goonellabah	Italo Stars (12th)	Tony Perkins (Richmond Rovers)	Steve Fredericks (Lismore Workers)	
1990	Lismore Workers (11th)	Lismore Workers (12th)			Lennox Head	Lennox Head	Lismore Workers (10th)		Greg Piper (South Lismore)	
1991	Lismore Thistles (10th) & Richmond Rovers (5th) (joint Champions)	Lismore Thistles (9th)			Brunswick Valley	Brunswick Valley	Lismore Workers (11th)	Steve Morrissey (Lismore Thistles)	Steve Morrissey (Lismore Thistles)	
1992	Lismore Thistles (11th)	Lismore Thistles (10th)			Maclean	Ballina	Italo Stars (13th)	Paul Wiltshire (Lismore Workers)	Brett Towner (South Lismore) & Ian Hutchinson (Lismore Thistles) – 13 goals	
1993	South Lismore (1st)	South Lismore (1st)			Tintenbar	Bangalow	Lismore Workers (12th)	Sam Tancred (Lismore Workers)	Brett Towner (South Lismore)	
1994	Goonellabah (1st)	Goonellabah (2nd)			Grafton	Grafton	Lismore Workers (13th)	Darren Beardow (Lismore Thistles) (1st)	Jim Phillips (Goonellabah) – 13 goals	
1995	Goonellabah (2nd)	Goonellabah (3rd)			Bangalow	Nimbin Headers	Lismore Workers (14th)	Matthew Bath (Goonellabah)	Matthew Bath (Goonellabah) – 24 goals	
1996	Richmond Rovers (6th)	Lismore Workers (13th)			Italo Stars	Italo Stars	Lismore Workers (15th)	Brett Towner (South Lismore)	Matthew Olley (Goonellabah) – 31 goals	
1997	Casino (2nd)	Lismore Workers (14th)			Alstonville	Brunswick Valley	Lismore Thistles (5th)	Darren Beardow (Lismore Thistles) (2nd)	Darren Beardow (Lismore Thistles) & Paul Schaefer (Italo Stars) – 16 goals	
1998	Richmond Rovers (7th)	Goonellabah (4th)			Woodburn	Bangalow	Lismore Workers (16th)	Darren Beardow (Lismore Thistles) (3rd)	Nathan Scully (Casino) & Matthew Lampard (Goonellabah) – ?	
1999	Richmond Rovers (8th)	Maclean (1st)			Woodburn	Bangalow	Lismore Workers (17th)	Troy Percival (Ballina)	Tim Sheridan (Richmond Rovers) – 17 goals	
2000	Italo Stars (9th)	Italo Stars (7th)			Alstonville	Alstonville	Richmond Rovers (2nd)	Daniel Fung (Maclean)	Daniel Fung (Maclean) – 16 goals	
2001	Maclean (1st)	Maclean (2nd)			Richmond Rovers	Richmond Rovers	Lismore Workers (18th)	Lucas Wagland (Ballina)	Daniel Fung (Maclean) – 24 goals	
2002	Richmond Rovers (9th)	Italo Stars (8th)			Bangalow	Bangalow	Italo Stars (14th)	David Betteridge (Ballina)	Wayne Mortimer (Italo Stars)	
2003	Italo Stars (10th)	Italo Stars (9th)			Lennox Head	Bangalow	Byron Bay (1st)	Jim Harris (Maclean)	Wayne Mortimer (Italo Stars) & Troy Matthews (Richmond Rovers)	
2004	Lismore Workers (12th)	Richmond Rovers (3rd)			Goonellabah	Goonellabah	Byron Bay (2nd)	Anthony Alvos (1st, Lismore Workers)	Tom Guttormsen (Lismore Workers)	
2005	Byron Bay (1st)	Goonellabah (5th)			Lennox Head	Lennox Head	Ballina (1st)	Aaron Richter-Steers (Byron Bay)	Peter O'Neill (Goonellabah) – 23 goals	
2006	Byron Bay (2nd)	Byron Bay (1st)			Burringbar	Burringbar	Goonellabah (2nd)	Ben Andrews (Goonellabah)	Paul Kirkland (Lennox Head) & Tom Guttormsen (Lismore Workers)	
2007	Richmond Rovers (10th)	Richmond Rovers (4th)			Tweed Heads	Lismore Thistles	Byron Bay (3rd)	Troy Matthews (Richmond Rovers)	Paul Kirkland (Lennox Head) & Jordy Campbell (Byron Bay) – 18 goals	
2008	Richmond Rovers (11th)	Richmond Rovers (5th)			Alstonville	South Lismore	Richmond Rovers (3rd)	Ben Andrews (Lennox Head) & Anthony Alvos (2nd, Lismore Workers)	Troy Matthews (Richmond Rovers)	Lismore Thistles (1st)
2009	Richmond Rovers (12th)	Richmond Rovers (6th)			Pottsville	Pottsville	Richmond Rovers (4th)	Darren Beardow (4th, Lismore Thistles) & Anthony Alvos (3rd, Lismore Workers)	Max Latimer (Italo Stars) & Jordy Campbell (Byron Bay) – 16 goals	Alstonville (1st)
2010	Richmond Rovers (13th)	Goonellabah (6th)			Lennox Head	Casino	Goonellabah (3rd)	Dave Annetts (Goonellabah)	Dave Annetts (Goonellabah) – 23 goals	Byron Bay (1st)
2011	Goonellabah (3rd)	Richmond Rovers (7th)			Bangalow	Lennox Head	Goonellabah (4th)	Matthew Olley (Richmond Rovers)	Matthew Olley (Richmond Rovers)	Byron Bay (2nd)
2012	Lismore Workers (13th)	Richmond Rovers (8th)			Bangalow	Bangalow	Lismore Workers (19th)	Martin Kelleher (Lismore Workers)	Martin Kelleher (Lismore Workers) – 18 goals	Byron Bay (3rd)
2013	Byron Bay (3rd)	Lismore Thistles (11th)			Ballina	Ballina	Lismore Thistles (6th)	Dean Casey (Casino)	Sebastien Bell (Byron Bay) – 28 goals	Richmond Rovers (1st)
2014	Richmond Rovers (14th)	Byron Bay (2nd)			Casino	Casino	Lismore Thistles (7th)	Jonathon See (1st, Richmond Rovers)	Jonathon See (1st, Richmond Rovers) – 28 goals	Lennox Head (1st)
2015	Richmond Rovers (15th)	Byron Bay (3rd)			Suffolk Park	Italo Stars	Lennox Head (1st)	Byron Milne (Lennox Head)	Byron Milne (Lennox Head)	Lennox Head (2nd)
2016	Bangalow (1st)	Goonellabah (7th)			Ballina	Suffolk Park	Richmond Rovers (5th)	Joel Rudgley (Bangalow)	Aaron Walker (Byron Bay) – 23 goals	Richmond Rovers (2nd)
2017	Byron Bay (4th)	Byron Bay (4th)			South Lismore	South Lismore	Byron Bay (4th)	Kaiden Powell (Goonellabah)	Joel Wood (Byron Bay)	Byron Bay (4th)
2018	Byron Bay (5th)	Richmond Rovers (9th)			Shores United	Ballina	Lismore Thistles (8th)	Jonathan See (2nd, Richmond Rovers)	Jonathan See (2nd, Richmond Rovers)	Byron Bay (5th)
2019	South Lismore (2nd)	Byron Bay (5th)			Tintenbar East Ballina	Italo Stars	Bangalow (1st)	Patrick Kable (South Lismore)	Lisandro Luaces (Byron Bay) – 24 goals	Byron Bay (6th)
2020	Byron Bay (6th)	South Lismore (2nd)	Richmond Rovers	Lennox Head	Nimbin Headers	Ballina	Goonellabah (5th)		Diego Vazquez (Byron Bay) – 11 goals	Not played
2021	Not played	Richmond Rovers (10th)	Not played	Richmond Rovers	Not played	Shores United	South Lismore (1st)	Jye Wilson (Lismore Thistles)	Jonathan See (3rd, Richmond Rovers) – 12 goals	

== Honours – men (summary) ==
Club	ANZAC Cups	Premierships	Cyril Mayo Cups	Summer Youth League (SYL)	Total Honours (excluding SYL)
Lismore Workers (Eastwood United)	19 (9 as Eastwood United)	14 (10 as Eastwood United)	13 (9 as Eastwood United)	-	46 (28 as Eastwood United)
Italo Stars	14	9	10	-	33
Lismore Thistles	8	11	11	1	30
Richmond Rovers	5	10	15	2	30
Goonellabah Stars (defunct)	9	10	7	-	26
Goonellabah	5	7	3	-	15
Byron Bay	4	5	6	6	15
South Lismore	1	2	2	-	5
Methodist United (defunct)	2	1	-	-	3
Casino	-	-	2	-	2
South Stars United (a 2-year merger of Italo Stars & South Lismore, now defunct)	2	1	-	-	3
Maclean (joined FFNC in 1986 and departed for Football North Coast in 2008)	-	2	1	-	3
Ballina	1	-	-	-	1
Lennox Head	1	-	-	2	1
Bangalow	1	-	1	-	2
North Lismore (defunct)	-	-	1	-	1
Alstonville	-	-	-	1	-
TOTALS	71	71	72	12	214

== The Treble ==
Women

The treble (Callan McMillan Shield, premiership and grand final in the same season) has been achieved by 5 clubs on at least 10 occasions (unsure of the complete list due to incomplete records):

Club	Season
Lismore Workers	2002, 2005
Lennox Head	2008
Alstonville	2010, 2011, 2012
Bangalow	2014, 2015, 2016
Lismore Thistles	2018

Men

The treble (ANZAC Cup, premiership and grand final in the same season) has been achieved by 5 clubs on 8 occasions. In 2017, Byron Bay became the first club to win four trophies: the traditional treble plus the Summer Youth League.

Club	Season
Goonellabah Stars (defunct)	1955, 1960
Italo Stars	1977, 1978
Lismore Workers	1990
Richmond Rovers	2008, 2009
Byron Bay	2017

== Awards ==
=== 2019 awards ===
Player of the Year

- Women (Premier Division) – Elsa Mangan (Lismore Thistles)
- Men (Premier Division) – Patrick Kable (South Lismore)

Golden Boot

- Women (Premier Division) – Olivia Collins (Lismore Thistles) – 17 goals
- Women (Open) – Catherine North (Uki) – 31 goals
- Men (Premier Division) – Lisandro Luaces (Byron Bay) – 24 goals
- Men (Open) – Glen Godbee (Shores United) – 33 goals

Women's Premier Team of the Year

- 1 Arky Ryall (Lismore Thistles)
- 2 Violet Innes (Byron Bay)
- 3 Brittney Webster (Alstonville)
- 4 Natalia Brooker (Lismore Thistles)
- 5 Maddie Green (Byron Bay)
- 6 Chelsea Coleman (Lennox Head)
- 7 Elsa Mangan (Lismore Thistles)
- 8 Laura Marlowe (Italo Stars)
- 9 Jessie Jordan (Alstonville)
- 10 Lisa Bolt (Alstonville)
- 11 Olivia Collins (Lismore Thistles)
- Coach – Thaya Evenden (Lennox Head)

Men's Premier Team of the Year

- 1 Pierce Essery (Byron Bay)
- 2 Jeremy Perkins (Richmond Rovers)
- 3 James Tomlinson (Byron Bay)
- 4 Shayne Smith (Richmond Rovers)
- 5 Bobby Bugden (Richmond Rovers)
- 6 Joel Rudgley (Bangalow)
- 7 Oscar Stahl (Lismore Thistles)
- 8 Patrick Kable (South Lismore)
- 9 Diego Vazquez (Byron Bay)
- 10 Jye Wilson (Lismore Thistles)
- 11 Lisandro Luaces (Byron Bay)
- Coach – Damon Bell (Byron Bay)

Referee of the Year

- Connor Johnston

Birmingham Dedication to Football Award

- Wally Edwards (Richmond Rovers)

Club Championship

- Byron Bay (3rd)

=== 2018 awards ===
Player of the Year

- Women (Premier Division) – Keea Parrish (Lismore Thistles)
- Men (Premier Division) – Jonathon See (Richmond Rovers)

Golden Boot

- Women (Premier Division) – Stephanie Foreman (Mullumbimby Brunswick Valley)
- Women (Open) – Joyce De Wit (Ballina)
- Men (Premier Division) – Jonathon See (Richmond Rovers)
- Men (Open) – Harrison Langford (Lennox Head)

Team of the Year – women's premier

- Goalkeeper – Karoline Verrall (Lennox Head)
- Defenders – Thaya Evenden (Lennox Head), Breanna Gatt (Lismore Thistles), Brooke Sheehan (Lennox Head), Brittany Webster (Alstonville)
- Midfielders – Lisa Bolt (Byron Bay), Zoe Corbett (Byron Bay), Elsa Mangan (Lismore Thistles), Caitlin Moss (Lismore Thistles)
- Strikers – Stephanie Foreman (Mullumbimby Brunswick Valley), Keea Parrish (Lismore Thistles)
- Coach – Paul Albertini (Lismore Thistles)

Team of the Year – Men's Premier

- Goalkeeper – Chris Jones (Richmond Rovers)
- Defenders – Patrick Kable (South Lismore), Shayne Smith (Richmond Rovers), James Tomlinson (Byron Bay), Gabe Vidler (Alstonville)
- Midfielders – Bob Mullenburg (South Lismore), Tom Pitman (Goonellabah), Oscar Stahl (Lismore Thistles), Kurt Walker (Richmond Rovers)
- Strikers – Jonathan Pierce (Byron Bay), Jonathon See (Richmond Rovers)
- Coach – Cameron Hyde (South Lismore)

Referee of the Year

- Anthony Smith (4th)

Birmingham Dedication to Football

- Brian Breckenridge (Tumbulgum)

Club Championship

- Alstonville

=== 2017 awards ===
Player of the Year

- Women (Premier Division) – Hollie Jarrett (Bangalow)
- Men (Premier Division) – Kaiden Powell (Goonellabah)

Golden Boot

- Women (Premier Division) – Hollie Jarrett (Bangalow) – 19 goals
- Men (Premier Division) – Joel Wood (Byron Bay)

Team of the Year

Women

- Goalkeeper – Karoline Verrall (Lennox Head)
- Defenders – Erin Huntsman (Alstonville), Claudia Hewitt (Lismore Thistles), Miranda Sochacki (Bangalow), Thaya Evenden (Lennox Head)
- Midfielders – Elsa Mangan (Lismore Thistles), Caitlan Moss (Lismore Thistles), Jess Woolfe (Alstonville), Jenna Lees (Lismore Thistles)
- Strikers – Keea Parrish (Lismore Thistles), Hollie Jarrett (Bangalow)
- Coach – Mick Smith (Lennox Head)

Men

- Goalkeeper – Chris Jones (Richmond Rovers)
- Defenders – James Tomlinson (Byron Bay), Shayne Smith (Richmond Rovers), Daniel Flynn (Richmond Rovers), Jay Keevers (Lismore Workers)
- Midfielders – Russell Dent (Richmond Rovers), Kaiden Powell (Goonellabah), Sam Shepherd (Byron Bay), Ben Ahern (Byron Bay)
- Strikers – Aaron Walker (Byron Bay), Dean Casey (Casino)
- Coach – Damon Bell (Byron Bay)

Referee of the Year

- Anthony Smith (3rd)

Birmingham Dedication to Football Award

- Jason Toniello (Lismore Workers)

Club Championship

- Mullumbimby Brunswick Valley

=== 2016 awards ===
Player of the Year

- Women – Hollie Jarrett (Bangalow)
- Men – Joel Rudgley (Bangalow)

Golden Boot Awards

- Women (Premier Division) – Hollie Jarrett (Bangalow) – 21 goals
- Women (Open) – Tara Bayles (Italo Stars) – 33 goals
- Men (Premier Division) – Aaron Walker (Byron Bay) – 23 goals
- Men (Open) – Adam Church (Mullumbimby Brunswick Valley) – 30 goals

FFNC premiership Team of the Year

Women

- Goalkeeper – Karoline Verral (Lennox Head)
- Defenders – Karina Young (Lismore Thistles), Isabelle Braly (Bangalow), Brooke Sheehan (Alstonville), Claudia Hewitt (Lismore Thistles)
- Midfielders – Elsa Mangan (Lismore Thistles), Laani Winkler-Harding (Bangalow), Emily McCann (Alstonville)
- Strikers – Hollie Jarrett (Bangalow), Jade Bianchetti (Bangalow), Chelsea Coleman (Lennox Head)
- Coach – Mick Smith (Lennox Head)

Men

- Joel Rudgley, Josh Cole, Sam Ireland (Bangalow)
- James Tomlinson (Byron Bay)
- Brad Robertson, Matt Graham, Kurt Stephens (Goonellabah)
- Jay Keevers (Lismore Workers)
- Shane Smith, Russell Dent, Jonathon See (Richmond Rovers)

Referee of the Year (The Glen Gibbs Trophy)

- Anthony Smith (2nd)

Birmingham Dedication to Football Award

- The Hanigan Family (Bangalow)

Club Championship

- Richmond Rovers (12th)

=== 2015 awards ===
Player of the Year (Premier Division)

- Women – Jade Bianchetti (Bangalow)
- Men – Byron Milne (Lennox Head)

Golden Boot

- Women (Premier Division) – Jade Bianchetti (Bangalow) – 40 goals
- Men (Premier Division) – Byron Milne (Lennox Head)

Teams of the Year (Premier Division)

Women

- Goalkeeper – Simone Stroet (Bangalow)
- Defenders – Bree Minikin (Lennox Head), Isabele Braly (Bangalow), Brooke Sheehan (Alstonville), Jess Woolf (Alstonville)
- Midfielders – Hollie Jarrett (Bangalow), Elsa Mangan (Lismore Workers), Chelsea Coleman (Lennox Head)
- Strikers – Keea Parrish (Lismore Workers), Emily McCann (Alstonville), Jade Bianchetti (Bangalow)
- Coach – Mick Smith (Lennox Head)

Men

Referee of the Year

- Anthony Smith (1st)

Birmingham Dedication to Football Award

- Matthew Wiltshire (Alstonville)

Club Championship

- Byron Bay

=== 2014 awards ===
Player of the Year (Premier Division)

- Women – Jade Bianchetti (Bangalow)
- Men – Jonathon See (Richmond Rovers)

Golden Boot Awards

- Women (Premier Division) – Jade Bianchetti (Bangalow) – 40 goals
- Women (Open) – Stephanie Foreman (Mullumbimby Brunswick Valley) – 54 goals
- Men (Premier Division) – Jonathon See (Richmond Rovers) – 28 goals
- Men (Open) – Sam Tomlinson (Shores United) & Eduardo Divanna (Eureka) – 28 goals

Teams of the Year

Women

- Goalkeeper – Georgia Spencer (Alstonville)
- Defenders – Tanika Hand (Bangalow), Karina Young (Lismore Thisltes), Sarah Duley (Lennox Head), Laura St Ruth (Lismore Workers)
- Midfielders – Jessica Woolfe (Alstonville), Elsa Mangan (Lismore Workers), Rose Argent (Bangalow)
- Strikers – Jade Bianchetti (Bangalow), Serena Mangan (Lismore Workers), Hollie Jarrett (Bangalow)
- Coach – Luke McWaide (Lismore Workers)

Men

- Goalkeeper – Brad Robertson (Lismore Thistles)
- Defenders – Eamon Banks (Alstonville), Jay Keevers (Lismore Workers), Max Hospers (Lismore Thistles), Shaun Packham (Byron Bay)
- Midfielders – Kurt Walker (Lismore Workers), Russell Dent (Richmond Rovers), Connor Cannon (Byron Bay)
- Strikers – Jonathon See (Richmond Rovers), Kazi Tsukamoto (Byron Bay), Liam Giles (Alstonville)
- Coach – Brian Bugden (Richmond Rovers)

Referee of the Year

- Stuart Bradley

Birmingham Dedication to Soccer Award

- Glenn Rose (Kyogle)

Club Championship

- Richmond Rovers (11th)

=== 2013 awards ===
Player of the Year

- Women – Jade Bianchetti (Bangalow)
- Men – Dean Casey (Casino)

Golden Boot Awards

- Women (Premier League) – Jade Bianchetti (Bangalow) – 28 goals
- Women (Open) – Tiaharna Close (Casino) – 34 goals
- Men (Premier League) – Sebastian Bell (Byron Bay) – 28 goals
- Men (Open) – Gou Brummel Huis (Bangalow) – 34 goals

Teams of the Year

Women

- Goalkeeper – Karoline Verrall (Richmond Rovers)
- Brooke Sheehan (Alstonville), Hannah Sheehan (Alstonville), Sarah Flower (Richmond Rovers), Georgia Keen (Alstonville), Jenna Lees (Lismore Thistles), Isabelle Pratt (Lismore Workers), Chelsea Coleman (Alstonville), Jade Bianchetti (Bangalow), Abbie Heffernan (Richmond Rovers), Hollie Jarrett (Bangalow)
- Coach – Paul Hanigan (Bangalow)

Men

- Goalkeeper – Brad Robertson (Lismore Thistles)
- Eamon Banks (Alstonville), Max Toovey (Lismore Thistles), Max Hospers (Lismore Thistles), Shaun Packham (Byron Bay), Kurt Walker (Lismore Workers), Darren Beardow (Lismore Thistles), Joel Rudgley (Bangalow), Jonathon See (Richmond Rovers), Dean Casey (Casino), Sebastian Bell (Byron Bay)
- Coach – Paul Parmenter (Lismore Thistles)

Referee of the Year

- Jared Seiffert

Birmingham Dedication to Soccer

- Rob Sheehan (Alstonville)

Club Championship

- Lismore Thistles

=== 2012 awards ===
Player of the Year

- Women – Hollie Jarrett (Bangalow)
- Men – Martin Kelleher (Lismore Workers)

Golden Boot Awards

- Women (Premier Division) – Jade Bianchetti (Bangalow) – 23 goals
- Women (Open) – Tiaharna Close (Casino) – 37 goals
- Men (Premier Division) – Martin Kelleher (Lismore Workers) – 18 goals
- Men (Open) – Phil Courtney (Nimbin Headers) – 39 goals

Team of the Year

Women

- Goalkeeper – Sophie Thomson (Ballina)
- Jade Bianchetti (Bangalow), Kendall Brazendale (Lennox Head), Chelsea Coleman (Alstonville), Ellie Fryer (Alstonville), Abbie Heffernan (Richmond Rovers), Hollie Jarrett (Bangalow), Georgia Keen (Alstonville), Brooke Sheehan (Alstonville), Laani Winkler-Harding (Lismore Thistles), Kim Wraight (Lismore Thistles)
- Coach – David Weaver (Ballina)

Men

- Goalkeeper – Bryce Walley (Casino)
- Eamon Banks (Alstonville), Richard Hanna (Alstonville), Max Hospers (Lismore Thistles), Martin Kelleher (Lismore Workers), Luke McWaide (Richmond Rovers), Wayne Mortimer (Lismore Workers), Baithok Ring (Goonellabah), Sam Robson (Byron Bay), Joel Saye (Richmond Rovers), Kurt Walker (Lismore Workers)
- Coach – Troy Taylor (Alstonville)

Referee of the Year

- Stuart Bradley

Birmingham Dedication to Soccer

- Paul Albertini (Lismore Thistles)

Club Championship

- Goonellabah

=== 2011 awards ===
Player of the Year (Premier Division)

- Women – Abbie Heffernan (Richmond Rovers) & Teneille Shaw (Bangalow)
- Men – Matt Olley (Richmond Rovers)

Golden Boot Award (Premier Division)

- Women – Chelsea Coleman (Alstonville) & Hollie Jarrett (Bangalow) – 25 goals
- Men – Matt Olley (Richmond Rovers)

Team of the Year (Premier Division)

Women

- Goalkeeper – Sophie Thompson (Byron Bay)
- Defenders – Tenielle Shaw (Bangalow), Ellie Fryer (Alstonville), Maria Wilson (Lismore Workers)
- Midfielders – Sarah Flower (Richmond Rovers), Brooke Sheehan (Alstonville), Elsa Mangan (Alstonville), Deanna Thomson (Bangalow)
- Strikers – Hollie Jarrett (Bangalow), Abbie Heffernan (Richmond Rovers), Chelsea Coleman (Alstonville), Tegan Blanch (Richmond Rovers)
- Coach – Rob Sheehan (Alstonville)

Men

- Goalkeeper – Lucas Wagland (Ballina)
- Defenders – Max Hospers (Lismore Thistles), Mitchell Flower (Richmond Rovers), Joel Saye (Richmond Rovers)
- Midfielders – Dave Lonie (Pottsville), Kurt Walker (Lismore Workers), Ian Mcgregor (Richmond Rovers), Matt Dorigo (Goonellabah)
- Strikers – Kazuhiro Tsukamoto (Byron Bay), Wayne Mortimer (Casino), Matt Olley (Richmond Rovers)
- Coach – Scott Collis (Lismore Workers)

Referee of the Year

- Luke Mackney (3rd)

Club Championship

- Bangalow

=== 2010 awards ===
Player of the Year

- Women (1st Division) – Sarah Flower (Richmond Rovers)
- Men (Premier Division) – Dave Annetts (Goonellabah)

Golden Boot

- Women (1st Division) – Chelsea Coleman (Alstonville) – 28 goals
- Women (Open) – Tiaharna Close (Casino) – 43 goals
- Men (Premier Division) – Dave Annetts (Goonellabah) – 23 goals
- Men (Open) – Steven Clifford (Ballina) – 25 goals

Teams of the Year

Women

1. Tegan Blanch (Richmond Rovers), 2. Christy Hopley (Bangalow), 3. Renee Cowan (Lismore Workers), 4. Laura St Ruth (Lismore Workers), 5. Josie Bancroft (Lismore Workers), 6. Ellie Fryer (Alstonville), 7. Ruby Edwards (Alstonville), 8. Sarah Flower (Richmond Rovers), 9. Chloe Dunsmore (Bangalow), 10. Chelsea Coleman (Alstonville), 11. Hollie Jarrett (Bangalow)
- Coach of the Year – Corey Loft (Lismore Workers)

Men

1. Brad Robertson (Goonellabah), 2. Mitchell Flower (Richmond Rovers), 3. Dane Seymour (Ballina), 4. Dylan Rippon (Goonellabah), 5. Paul Pomroy (Goonellabah), 6. Anthony Alvos (Lismore Workers), 7. Daniel Baxter-Wright (Alstonville), 8. Aaron Heffernan (Richmond Rovers), 9. Jonathon See (Richmond Rovers), 10. Dave Annetts (Goonellabah), 11. Dave Lonie (Pottsville)
- Coach of the Year – Dave Lonie (Pottsville)

Referee of the Year

- Adam Coupe

Birmingham Dedication to Football

- Steve Towner (South Lismore)

Club Championship

- Richmond Rovers (10th)

=== 2009 awards ===
Player of the Year

- Women (1st Division) – Martene Wallace (Italo Stars)
- Men (Premier Division) – Darren Beardow (4th) (Lismore Thistles) & Anthony Alvos (3rd) (Lismore Workers)

Golden Boot

- Women (1st Division) – Hollie Jarrett (Bangalow) & Martene Wallace (Italo Stars) – 23 goals
- Women (Open) – Alexandra Kennedy (Ballina) – 21 goals
- Men (Premier Division) – Max Latimer (Italo Stars) & Jordy Campbell (Byron Bay) – 16 goals
- Men (Open) – Dean Treveton (Brunswick Valley) – 24 goals

Teams of the Year

Women

- Tegan Blanch (Richmond Rovers), Whitney McNall (Richmond Rovers), Jessica Grissell (Woodburn), Tennielle Shaw (Bangalow), Sarah Flower (Richmond Rovers), Martene Wallace (Italo Stars), Renae Cowan (Lismore Workers), Brooke Sheehan (Alstonville), Hollie Jarrett (Bangalow), Rose Argent (Bangalow), Teonie Rushton (Richmond Rovers)
- Coach of the Year – Joel Rudgley (Bangalow)

Men

- Goalkeeper – Andrew Marshall (Richmond Rovers)
- Joel Saye (Richmond Rovers), Dane Seymour (Ballina), Daniel Morrow (Goonellabah), Clint Willoughby (Italo Stars), Russell Dent (Richmond Rovers), Anthony Alvos (Lismore Workers), Darren Beardow (Lismore Thistles), Ben Casagrande (Richmond Rovers), Mark Rosenstein (Goonellabah), Max Latimer (Italo Stars), Jordy Campbell (Byron Bay)
- Coach of the Year – Paul Ianna (Lismore Workers)

Referee of the Year

- Luke Mackney (2nd)

Birmingham Dedication to Soccer Award

- Brenda Zakaras (Lennox Head) & Frank Scott (Alstonville)

Club Championship

- Richmond Rovers (9th)

=== 2008 awards ===
Player of the Year

- Women (1st Division) – Shelley West-Watts (Lismore Thistles)
- Men (Premier Division) – Ben Andrews (Lennox Head) & Anthony Alvos (Lismore Workers)

Golden Boot

- Women (1st Division) – Chelsea Coleman (Lennox Head)
- Women (Open) – Naomi Dean (Bangalow)
- Men (Premier Division) – Troy Matthews (Richmond Rovers)
- Men (Open) – Michael Ravenscroft (Goonellabah)

Teams of the Year

Women

- Whitney McNall, Angela Penfound (Richmond Rovers), Thaya Evenden, Sophie Towner, Amanda Brett, Abigail Allardyce (Lennox Head), Brooke Sheehan, Courtney Nelson (Alstonville), Jane DeConti, Teonie Rushton (Italo Stars), Shelley West-Watts (Lismore Thistles)
- Women's Coach of the Year – John De Conti (Italo Stars)

Men

- Nathan Wilson (Pottsville), Dane Seymour, Dave Betterridge, Shannon Maciejewski (Ballina), Joel Saye, Mitchell Flower (Richmond Rovers), Anthony Alvos (Lismore Workers), Bill Latimer (Italo Stars), Mark Rosenstein (Goonellabah), Ben Andrews (Lennox Head), Tom Boland (Lismore Thistles)
- Men's Coach of the Year – Ken MacPherson (Lismore Thistles)

Referee of the Year

- Tanya De Boer

Birmingham Dedication to Soccer

- Carlo Borra (Richmond Rovers) & the Lee family (Pottsville)

Club Championship

- Richmond Rovers

=== 2007 awards ===
Player of the Year

- Women – Gypsy Hechtl (Lismore Workers)
- Men – Troy Matthews (Richmond Rovers)

Golden Boot Awards

- Women – Abigail Allardyce (Lennox Head) – 36 goals
- Men – Paul Kirkland (Lennox Head) & Jordy Campbell (Byron Bay) – 18 goals

Team of the Year (Premier Division)

Women

- Goalkeeper – Jessica Rasso (Burringbar)
- Defenders – Sharde Pohatu (Burringbar), Laura Cahill (Burringbar), Fallon Campbell (Richmond Rovers), Thaya Evenden (Lennox Head)
- Midfielders – Gypsy Hechtl (Lismore Workers), Amanda Brett (Lennox Head), Sophie Towner (Lennox Head), Martene Wallace (Lennox Head)
- Strikers – Samantha Walsh (Tumbulgum), Abigail Allardyce (Lennox Head)
- Coach – Damion Davis (Lennox Head)

Men

- Goalkeeper – Alex Pratt (Bangalow)
- Defenders – Joel Saye (Richmond Rovers), Scott Coster (Richmond Rovers), Shaun Packham (Byron Bay), Mike Raeburn (Lennox Head)
- Midfielders – Anthony Alvos (Lismore Workers), Joel Rudgley (Bangalow), Jonathan Pierce (Byron Bay), Ben Casagrande (Richmond Rovers)
- Strikers – Troy Matthews (Richmond Rovers), Paul Kirkland (Lennox Head)
- Coach – Brendan Logan (Goonellabah) & Damon Bell (Bangalow)

Referee of the Year

- Luke Mackney (1st)

Club Championship

=== 2006 awards ===
Player of the Year

- Women – Martene Edwards (Richmond Rovers)
- Men – Ben Andrews (Goonellabah)

Golden Boot

- Women (1st Division) – Martene Edwards (Richmond Rovers)
- Men (Premier Division) – Paul Kirkland (Lennox Head) & Tom Guttormsen (Lismore Workers)

Premier Division Team of the Year (Women)

- Goalkeeper – Jaqueline Leuthi (Goonellabah)
- Defenders – Tanika Hand (Byron Bay), Renee Cowan (Lismore Workers), Thaya Evenden (Goonellabah), Whitney McNall (Richmond Rovers)
- Midfielders – Kim Wraight (Lismore Workers), Felicity Kerslake (Goonellabah), Martene Edwards (Richmond Rovers)
- Strikers – Hayley McAnelly (Richmond Rovers), Jenna Gollan (Lismore Workers), Rose Argent (Byron Bay)

Premier Division Team of the Year (Men)

- Goalkeeper – Kai Connell (Byron Bay)
- Defenders – Aaron Richter-Steers (Byron Bay), Mike Raeburn (Lennox Head), Russell Dent (Richmond Rovers), AAron Heffernan (Richmond Rovers)
- Midfielders – Anthony Alvos (Richmond Rovers), Shaun Packham (Byron Bay), Erris Dufficy (Maclean)
- Strikers – Ben Andrews (Goonellabah), Tom Guttormsen (Lismore Workers), Paul Kirkland (Lennox Head)
- Premier Division Coach of the Year – Peter Ware (Byron Bay) & Steve O'Sullivan (Maclean)

Referee of the Year

- Leigh McMaster

Club Championship

- Richmond Rovers

=== 2005 awards ===
Player of the Year

- Women (1st Division) – Renee McIntosh (Richmond Rovers)
- Men (Premier Division) – Aaron Richter-Steers (Byron Bay)

Golden Boot

- Women (1st Division) – Renee McIntosh (Richmond Rovers) – 28 goals
- Women (Open) – Tracy Want (Lismore Thistles) & Courtney Nelson (Alstonville)
- Men (Premier Division) – Peter O'Neill (Goonellabah) – 23 goals
- Men (Open) – Matthew Flaherty (Woodburn)

Premier Division Team of the Year

- Goalkeeper – Brett Chaplin (Goonellabah)
- Defenders – Aaron Richter-Steers (Byron Bay), Russell Dent (Richmond Rovers), Damien Keevers (Lismore Workers), Stewart Coughran (Casino)
- Midfielders – Anthony Alvos (Lismore Workers), Darren Beardow (Lismore Thistles), Kevin Crofton (Maclean)
- Strikers – Peter O'Neill (Goonellabah), Ben Andrews (Goonellabah), Wayne Mortimer (Italo Stars)
- Coach – Peter Ware (Byron Bay)

Referee of the Year

- Glenn Gibbs (3rd)

Birmingham Dedication to Soccer Award

- Nick Rudgley (Bangalow)

Club Championship

- Alstonville

=== 2004 awards ===
Player of the Year

- Women – Felicity Kerslake (Southern Cross University)
- Men – Anthony Alvos (Lismore Workers)

Golden Boot Awards

- Women – Rose Argent (Byron Bay)
- Men – Tom Guttormsen (Lismore Workers)

Team of the Year

Men (Premier Division)

- Goalkeeper – Lucas Wagland (Ballina)
- Defenders – Shaun Packham (Byron Bay), Anthony Nind (Lismore Thistles), Tim Sheridan (Richmond Rovers)
- Midfielders – Christian Watson (Ballina), Anthony Alvos (Lismore Workers), Damien Keevers (Lismore Workers), Kevin Crofton (Maclean)
- Strikers – Tom Guttormsen (Lismore Workers), Wayne Mortimer (Casino), Adam Bostock (Byron Bay)
- Coach – Peter Rologas (Bangalow)

Referee of the Year

- Glen Gibbs (2nd)

Club Championship

- Richmond Rovers

=== 2003 awards ===
Player of the Year

- Women – Katie Parker (Richmond Rovers)
- Men – Jim Harris (Maclean)

Golden Boot

- Women – Katie Parker (Richmond Rovers)
- Men – Wayne Mortimer (Italo Stars) & Troy Matthews (Richmond Rovers)

Premier Division Team of the Year (Men)

- Goalkeeper – Brett Chaplin (Lismore Thistles)
- Defenders – Anthony Nind (Lismore Thistles), Ben Haigh (Alstonville), Rowan Walker (Alstonville)
- Midfielders – Jim Harris (Maclean), Anthony Alvos (Lismore Workers), Brett Lane (Richmond Rovers), Clint Willoughby (Italo Stars), Kevin Crofton (Maclean)
- Strikers – Wayne Mortimer (Italo Stars), Jed Wright (Byron Bay)
- Premier Division Coach of the Year – Stuart Harris (Italo Stars) & Dennis Dalcin (Casino Cobras)

Referee of the Year

- Clive Owen

Club Championship

- Lennox Head

=== 2002 awards ===
Player of the Year

- Women – Martene Edwards (Richmond Rovers)
- Men – David Betteridge (Ballina)

Golden Boot

- Women – Martene Edwards (Richmond Rovers)
- Men – Wayne Mortimer (Italo Stars)

Premier Division Team of the Year (Men)

- Goalkeeper – Lucas Wagland (Ballina)
- Defenders – David Betteridge (Ballina), Luke McAnelly (Richmond Rovers),
- Midfielders – Kevin Crofton (Maclean), Anthony Alvos (Lismore Workers),
- Strikers – Wayne Mortimer (Italo Stars),
- Reserves – Darren Beardow (Lismore Thistles), Brett Chaplin (Lismore Thistles), Tim Casagrande (Italo Stars), Craig Wiblen (Italo Stars)
- Coaches – Graham Bird (Byron Bay) & John Percival (Ballina)

Referee of the Year

- Stuart Bradley

Club Championship

- Byron Bay

=== 2001 awards ===
Player of the Year (Premier League)

- Women – Natalie Anderson (Maclean)

Golden Boot (Premier League)

- Men – Daniel Fung (Maclean) – 24 goals

Club Championship

- Italo-Stars (1st)

=== 2000 awards ===
Player of the Year (Premier League)

- Women – Hayley McAnelly (Richmond Rovers)
- Men – Daniel Fung (Maclean)

Golden Boot (Premier League)

- Women – Martene Edwards (Richmond Rovers)
- Men – Daniel Fung (Maclean) – 16 goals

Premier Division Team of the Year (Men)

- Goalkeeper – Scott Collis (Lismore Workers)
- Defenders – Todd Gava (Italo Stars), Aaron Nugent (Italo Stars), Luke McAnelly (Richmond Rovers), Stewart Coughran (Southern Cross University)
- Midfielders – Anthony Alvos (Lismore Workers), Darren Beardow (Lismore Thistles), Craig Metcalfe (Italo Stars), Todd Patch (Southern Cross University)
- Strikers – Wayne Mortimer (Casino), Daniel Fung (Maclean), Tim Sheridan (Richmond Rovers)
- Coach – Stuart Harris (Italo Stars)

Referee of the Year

- Lee MacMaster

Club Championship

- Richmond Rovers

=== 1999 awards ===
Player of the Year

- Female – Ashley Wilson (Goonellabah)
- Male – Troy Percival (Ballina)

Golden Boot Awards

- Female – Martene Edwards (Richmond Rovers) –
- Male – Tim Sheridan (Richmond Rovers) – 17 goals

Premier Division Team of the Year (Men)

- Goalkeeper – Lucas Wagland (Ballina)
- Defenders – Luke McAnelly (Richmond Rovers), Todd Gava (Italo Stars), Aaron Bylos (Maclean), Jason Collins (Southern Cross University)
- Midfielders – Darren Beardow (Lismore Thistles), Troy Percival (Ballina), Craig Metcalf (Italo Stars), Kevin Crofton (Maclean)
- Strikers – Neal Harding (Lismore Thistles), Grant Neilson (Maclean)
- Coach – Grant Nielson (Maclean)

Referee of the Year

- Mark Predebon

Dedication to Soccer Award

- Wal Trainor (Tintenbar)

=== 1998 awards ===
Player of the Year

- Female – Natalie Anderson (Maclean)
- Male – Darren Beardow (3rd) (Lismore Thistles)

Golden Boot

- Female (1st Division) – Tracy Want (Maclean)
- Female (Open) – Jenny Bouke (Italo Stars)
- Male (Premier Division) – Nathan Scully (Casino) & Matthew Lampard (Goonellabah)
- Male (Open) – Phillip Alley (Alstonville)

Premier Division Team of the Year (Men)

- Goalkeeper – Adam Fittock (Goonellabah)
- Defenders – Todd Gava (Italo Stars), Jason Toniello (Lismore Workers), Paul Wiltshire (Lismore Workers)
- Midfielders – Darren Beardow (Lismore Thistles), Anthony Alvos (Lismore Workers), Damien Keevers (Goonellabah), Greg Huxtable (Goonellabah), Dean Klower (Ballina)
- Strikers – Matthew Lampard (Goonellabah), Brad Bosworth (Lismore Workers)
- Coach – John Essex (Italo Stars)

Referee of the Year

- Dick Nolan

Club Championship

- Richmond Rovers

=== 1997 awards ===
Player of the Year (Premier League)

- Female – Martene Edwards (Richmond Rovers)
- Male – Darren Beardow (2nd) (Lismore Thistles)

Golden Boot

- Premier League (Female) – Cass Thorman (Richmond Rovers) – 23 goals
- Premier League (Male) – Darren Beardow (Lismore Thistles) & Paul Schaefer (Italo Stars) – 16 goals
- Open (Female) – ?
- Open (Male) – ?

Premier Division Team of the Year (Men)

- Goalkeeper – Sterling Collier (Byron Bay)
- Defenders – Paul Kirkland (Goonellabah), Tony Duncombe (Byron Bay), Todd Gava (Italo Stars), Martin Scott (Lismore Thistles)
- Midfielders – Anthony Alvos (Lismore Workers), Darren Beardow (Lismore Thistles), Brad Bosworth (Lismore Workers), Damien Keevers (Goonellabah)
- Strikers – Troy Percival (Lismore Thistles), Wayne Mortimer (Casino)
- Coach – Jeff Hogan (Casino)

Referee of the Year

- Dick Nolan

Club Championship

- Bangalow

=== 1996 awards ===
Player of the Year (Premier League)

- Female – Tracy Want (Maclean)
- Male – Brett Towner (South Lismore)

Golden Boot

- Premier League (Female) – Tracy Want (Maclean) – ?
- Premier League (Male) – Matthew Olley (Goonellabah) – 31 goals
- Open (Female) – Sheree McGrath (Nimbin United) – ?
- Open (Male) – Rohan Coe (Casino) – ?

Premier League Team of the Year

- Goalkeeper – Teja Liebetreu (Nimbin Headers)
- Defenders – Rod Kirkland (Lismore Thistles), Matthew Walsh (Lismore Workers), Jason Toniello (Lismore Workers), Paul Wiltshire (Lismore Workers)
- Midfielders – Anthony Alvos (Lismore Workers), Brad Bosworth (Lismore Workers), Darren Beardow (Lismore Thistles), Brett Towner (South Lismore)
- Strikers – Matthew Olley (Goonellabah), Todd Franks (South Lismore)
- Coach – Robbie Armbruster (Richmond Rovers)

Referee of the Year

- Stuart Hase

Life Membership

- Doug Edwards

Club Championship

- Richmond Rovers

=== 1995 awards ===
Player of the Year (Premier League)

- Male – Matthew Bath (Goonellabah)

Golden Boot

- Premier League – Matthew Bath (Goonellabah) – 24 goals
- Open – Anthony Gaggin (Italo Stars) & Andre Real (Woodburn) – 23 goals

Team of the Year (Premier League)

- Goalkeeper – Adam Fittock (Goonellabah)
- Defenders – Matthew Lacey (Goonellabah), Jason Toniello (Lismore Workers), Paul Wilkshire (Lismore Workers), John Newton (Goonellabah)
- Midfielders – Anthony Alvos (Lismore Workers), Jim Phillips (Goonellabah), Scott Wilson (Goonellabah), Darren Beardow (Lismore Thistles)
- Strikers – Matthew Bath (Goonellabah), Brett Towner (South Lismore)
- Coach – Renato Cheli (Goonellabah)

Referee of the Year

- Paul Bartolo

Dedication to Soccer

- John Armstrong

=== 1994 awards ===
Player of the Year

- Darren Beardow (Lismore Thistles)

Golden Boot

- Premier League – Jim Phillips (Goonellabah) – 13 goals
- Open – Perry LePetit (Alstonville) – 33 goals

Coach of the Year

- Renato Cheli (Goonellabah)

Referee of the Year

- Paul Bartolo

Dedication to Soccer

- Julie Clifford

Club Championship

- Goonellabah

=== 1993 awards ===
Player of the Year (Premier League)

- Sam Tancred (Lismore Workers)

Golden Boot

- Premier League – Brett Towner (South Lismore)
- Open – James Norris (Tintenbar)

Coach of the Year (Premier League)

- Renato Cheli (Goonellabah)

Referee of the Year

- Stuart Hase

Club Championship

- Bangalow

=== 1992 awards ===
Player of the Year (Premier League)

- Paul Wiltshire (Lismore Workers)

Golden Boot

- Premier League – Brett Towner (South Lismore) & Ian Hutchison (Lismore Thistles) – 13 goals
- Open – Stephen Bostock (Alstonville) – 26 goals

Coach of the Year (Premier League)

- Terry Woods (Lismore Thistles)

Referee of the Year

- Glenn Gibbs (1st)

Club Championship

- Ballina

=== 1989 awards ===
Player of the Year (Premier League)

- Tony Perkins (Richmond Rovers)

Golden Boot

- Men (Premier League) – Stephen Fredericks (Italo Stars)
- Men (Open) – Daniel Parker (Kyogle)

Coach of the Year

- Ken McPherson (Lismore Workers) & Jeff Hogan (Casino)

Junior Player of the Year

- Darren Beardow (Lismore Thistles)

=== 1984 awards ===
Coach of the Year

- Wayne Ianna (Lismore Workers)

=== 1983 awards ===
Player of the Year (1st Division) – Coleman Trophy

- Ken McPherson (Eastwood United)

Coach of the Year

- Lyle Wheeler (Bangalow)

Referee of the Year

- Richard Morrissey

=== 1982 awards ===
Player of the Year – Coleman Trophy & Bert Mullins Prize

- Tony Roder (Lismore Thistles)

=== 1981 awards ===
Player of the Year – Coleman Trophy (Inaugural) & George Gooley Award

- Terry Woods (Lismore Thistles)

Team of the Year

- Played Inter-Monaro in Lismore in October 1981. Inter-Monaro were a NSW State League side based in Queanbeyan, NSW.
- Glen Hart, Craig Kennedy, Bruce Harris, John Essex, Terry Woods (Lismore Thistles), Andrew Wilcox, Ian Layzell, Ken McPherson, Noel Fields, Laurie Carwadine, Robby Stevens, Ron Forder, Gordon Bryant, Glen Weir

== See also ==
- Football Federation Australia
