= History of Sunshine Coast Football =

The following details the year by year events for Sunshine Coast Football in Queensland, since the first recorded game on the North Coast in 1920.

== Beginnings – July 1920 ==
The first recorded game of association football on the then North Coast was played at Palmwoods between teams from Palmwoods and Buderim on Saturday 31 July 1920. The Palmwoods team was captained by Eddie Daniels and the Buderim team by Ernest Middleton. It's unclear where the game was played; the match report refers to the Palmwoods School of Arts end: "Palmwoods won the toss and defended the School of Arts end … ". The small Palmwoods School of Arts was located on Montville Road and was replaced by the current Palmwoods Memorial Hall in Main Street in 1922. It seems likely that the game was played at the current Palmwoods Sports & Recreation Reserve on the Palmwoods-Montville Road. Mr W Browne or possibly Brown was the referee. The final score was a 2–0 win to Palmwoods; the goal scorers being Eddie Daniels and E Renouf.

A return game between Buderim and Palmwoods was played at Buderim on Saturday 7 August 1920 with Buderim winning 5 – 4. It appears the Palmwoods team and supporters travelled via the now defunct Palmwoods-Buderim tramway. Wilf Bratton, who would tour New Zealand with the first Australian team in 1922 and debut for Australia (as official Socceroo Cap Number 12) in Wellington in June 1922, played for Palmwoods. As both teams had each won a game, a deciding game was played at Palmwoods on Saturday, 21 August. The deciding game was won by Buderim 3–2.

== Formation of the North Coast Football Association (NCFA) – April 1921 ==
These Palmwoods-Buderim friendly games sparked interest in association football in other districts of the North Coast and prompted formation of the North Coast Football Association (NCFA) at a meeting at Palmwoods on Saturday 9 April 1921. It was agreed that Palmwoods would be the NCFA's temporary headquarters. The first committee comprised:

- Patron – Mr JF Power
- President – Captain JT Tennent or Tennant (Mapleton)
- Senior Vice-President – Mr LF Baldry (North Arm)
- Honorary Secretary/Treasurer – Mr WJ Forde (Buderim)

At this time 4 clubs were affiliated with the NCFA – Buderim, Mapleton, North Arm and Palmwoods.

== First North Coast Representative Team – May 1921 ==
On Labor Day (8 Hour Day) 3 May 1921, after only 2 friendly fixtures had been played in the newly established NCFA competition, a North Coast representative team played a Brisbane Division 2 representative side at the Brisbane Cricket Ground as part of the Country Carnival. The originally selected North Coast team was: Daniels, Bratten, Stemp, Cutcliffe (possibly Cutmore), Newberry, Pack, Jensen, Williams, Bendall, Middleton, Sorenson; Reserves: Bycroft, Miller.

The team changed again following an NCFA committee meeting on Saturday, 30 April at Tapper's Rooms (W Tapper was an auctioneer) in Palmwoods:

- Buderim – A Bendall, G Newbery (possibly Newberry or Newbury), E Middleton (Captain), A Irnoen, N Sorensen, H Stemp
- Mapleton – F Moon, S Pack, J Simpson, G Cutmore
- Palmwoods – Eddie Daniels (Vice-Captain)
- Manager – WJ Forde (Buderim)

As The Telegraph newspaper noted, whilst the North Coast team was soundly beaten 7–2 (it was 3–0 at half-time) they "put up an exceedingly creditable performance". The team which played appears to have been different to that originally selected: C Moon (goalkeeper), W Jensen, S Pack, S Newberry (possibly Newbury), J Sorenson, H Henry, Eddie Daniels, Cutmore (Captain), J Simpson, Middleton, Bendall. Goalscorers for the North Coast were J Simpson and the second was a "beautiful cross-shot" by left-winger Bendall. The North Coast team played in white.

Some newspaper reports suggested some members of the North Coast team appeared to be new to the game; this was definitely true in the case of goalkeeper C Moon who was a convert from rugby league. History would repeat itself 47 years later in 1968 when the Caloundra Rugby League club, on being denied entry to North Coast Rugby League decided to play "soccer".

Many of the North Coast players were from a dairying background so after the morning milking had to rush to the nearest railway station to get to Brisbane for the game, and leave straight after the game to get home, hopefully in time for the evening milking. One player rode many miles on horseback to get to nearest railway station and didn't arrive home until 6:00 am the morning after the game.

== First games and first season – 1921 ==
1921, the first official season of the NCFA commenced with 4 teams – Palmwoods, Buderim, Mapleton and North Arm The first official fixtures were played on Saturday 14 May with Palmwoods at home to Buderim and Mapleton at home to North Arm. Mapleton played their first home game at the Mapleton School of Arts grounds. These grounds on Obi Obi Road still exist today as the Mapleton Community Hall Sports Ground.

The results (and goalscorers) of the first official fixtures played on the North Coast under the auspices of the NCFA were:

- Palmwoods 2 (Williams, R Robinson) – Buderim 3 (Bendall, Middleton, Sid Newberry)
- Mapleton 0 – North Arm 2 (Clark, Unknown). This game was refereed by the President of the NCFA, Captain Tennant.

The inaugural NCFA premiers were North Arm who were unbeaten, winning 7 and drawing 1 of their 8 games whilst scoring 33 goals and conceding just 3. Buck scored 21 of North Arm's goals. The match report for North Arm's 1–1 draw with Mapleton A on Saturday 6 August which clinched them the premiership, is revealing. Firstly, the clubs had developed nicknames mainly based on their colours:

- North Arm – the Blues
- Mapleton – the Maroons
- Palmwoods – the Tigers

Secondly, towards the end of the season Palmwoods were struggling to field a full team, travelling to Mapleton to play Mapleton B 2 players short. In the inaugural season Mapleton A finished 2nd and Palmwoods 3rd. Palmwoods were the only side to score twice against the premiers North Arm and the only team to score against North Arm at their home ground.

Thirdly, this was a rough game. Three North Arm forwards were "laid out" in the first 30 minutes with the Fox brothers (JR & TA Fox) being "laid out" twice in the first 16 minutes and Buck breaking 2 ribs in a collision in the 30th minute.

Fourthly, this game confirmed the emergence of Jack White who had an "outstanding" game in defence for North Arm. White was to go on and play for Queensland (in 1923) and for Australia against New Zealand (as official Socceroo Cap Number 20) in Brisbane in June 1923.

In late-August 1921 North Coast representative teams played teams from Brisbane at the Nambour Showgrounds in front of a crowd of about 250. North Coast B was beaten 2–0 by Brisbane B whilst North Coast A was beaten 4–0 by Brisbane A. At the after-game dinner it was revealed that a "prominent Nambour gentleman" would award a silver cup to the winner of the North Coast competition from the 1922 season. The North Coast teams which played Brisbane teams in August 1921 were:

North Coast B (Colours – Two Blues) Played Brisbane B in August 1921 at Nambour Showgrounds

Player	Club
BA Wardlaw	North Arm
A Jensen	
J Wardley	
M Moehan	
G Newbury (or Newberry or Newbery)	Buderim
H Stemp	Buderim
J Martindale	
S Bray	
F Renouf	Palmwoods
C Ward	North Arm
A Bendal (or Bendall)	Buderim

North Coast A (Colours – Red) Played Brisbane A in August 1921 at Nambour Showgrounds

Player	Club
J Tennent (possibly Tennant)	Mapleton
G Rae	
S Park (possibly Pack) who replaced W Eggleton (sick)	Mapleton
S White	North Arm
Ray Smith	
R Wardlaw	North Arm
Jack Cutmore	Mapleton
Wilf Bratton	Mapleton
Jock Simpson replaced W Buck (injured)	Mapleton
Rex Robinson	Palmwoods
J Flynn	Buderim

In September Corinthians Soccer Football team (from Brisbane) played a combined Buderim–Palmwoods team at Buderim and were beaten 3–2. The referee was Mr T Hurford.

There were some encouraging developments in 1921. Firstly, the Mapleton club was warmly embraced by the local community and signed 26 players, enabling it to field 2 teams in NCFA competitions. The two Mapleton teams, A & B played each other at Mapleton on Saturday 11 June with Mapleton A winning a "hard" game 1 – 0. Secondly, E Middleton, Buderim's captain offered to donate a cup provided 6 clubs competed. Thirdly, Mr J Power (of Mapleton), the Patron of the NCFA donated a silk pennant to be awarded to the winning club and the NCFA agreed to present gold medals to players from the winning club. Finally, teams from Beerwah, Nambour and Glasshouse Mountains expressed an interest in joining the competition in 1922.

== 1922 season ==
In March 1922 the Beerburrum Soccer Club was formed and joined the North Coast Football Association (NCFA). Mr H Beacroft was the inaugural Secretary.

In March the Buderim Club unanimously agreed to re-form the club. It was also agreed that a series of practice games be played at "Mr G Burnett's ground near the station". The elected office-bearers were:

- Patron – SJ Hood
- President & Captain – A Jensen
- Vice-Captain – E Middleton
- Secretary – AC Bendall
- Selection Committee – AC Bendall, E Middleton & A Jensen

In March it was reported the NCFA had received nominations for the upcoming season from 6 teams – Mapleton (2 teams), North Arm, Palmwoods, Beerburrum and Buderim. A nomination was also expected from a Nambour team. In late-March the Buderim club reported that healthy player numbers meant it would be able to field 2 teams, an A-grade and B-grade, in NCFA competitions. Fixtures commenced in April with 5 teams – Beerburrum, Buderim, Mapleton, North Arm and Palmwoods.

In April the NCFA decided to initiate a B-grade competition comprising teams from: Buderim, North Arm, Mapleton and Beerburrum. The NCFA also discussed moving representative games from Nambour to Buderim, Palmwoods or Beerburrum due to "sparse attendances".

The North Coast representative team participated in the Country Carnival at the Brisbane Cricket Ground on May 1 (May Day/Labor Day). This "Soccer" Carnival brought together the best players in Queensland and gave them the opportunity to be selected in the first ever Australian team which would tour New Zealand from May to July. The originally selected team to play Toowoomba was as follows, however, for the first time ever North Coast players (J White and Buck) were selected in the Country team to play Metropolis:

- Goalkeeper – A Wardlaw (North Arm)
- Backs – S Pack (Mapleton), T Rae (Mapleton)
- Half-Backs – J White (North Arm), F Flynn (Buderim), Miller (Beerburrum)
- Forwards – Jack Cutmore (Mapleton), Moorcroft (Beerburrum), Wilf Bratten (Montville), Buck (North Arm), AC Bendall (Buderim)
- Reserves – Rex Robinson (Palmwoods), Jock Simpson (Mapleton), J Wardlaw (North Arm), E Middleton (Buderim)

The North Coast beat an understrength Toowoomba 7–0 (3–0 at half-time) with the goalscorers being Moorecroft (3), Bratten (2) and Simpson (2). The North Coast team was nicknamed "the dairy farmers" by the newspapers due to the large number of dairy farmers and dairy workers in the team. Wilf Bratten was 1 of 8 Queensland players selected in the first ever Australian team that would tour New Zealand.

In October the North Arm played a friendly against the newly formed Kenilworth team, beating them 4–2.

== 1923 season ==
In February 1923 the annual meeting of the Buderim club was held at the Buderim School of Arts. The elected office-bearers were:

- Captain – Mr S Anderson
- Vice-Captain – Mr E Middleton
- President – Mr D Campbell
- Secretary & Treasurer – Mr J Will

The annual meeting of the North Coast Football Association (NCFA) was held in March at Geddes Cafe in Nambour. Mr G Gosling (Nambour) was voted in as the new president and Mr Egerton (Palmwoods) as the new Secretary. A vote of thanks was passed unanimously thanking the outgoing President Mr Tennant (Mapleton).

In March following 2 meetings at the Commercial Hotel the Nambour club was formed. The committee comprised: SJ Hobson, B Bycroft, G Gosling, E Wells (acting Secretary) and W Hitchings. Mr G Gosling, the owner of the Commercial Hotel offered to donate a ball to the new club, whilst arrangements were made to secure "Mr Donaldson's paddock" for training and Nambour Showgrounds for matches.

In late March the NCFA admitted the newly formed Kenilworth club. At the same meeting, the NCFA Vice-President, Mr J Power was thanked for donating the Power Cup to the competition.

6 clubs competed for the Power Challenge Cup including the newly formed Nambour club – Buderim, Beerburrum, Kenilworth, Mapleton, Nambour and North Arm. The Telegraph newspaper described Beerburrum as "the most progressive Soccer club on the North Coast" noting that they were "...the only club with goal nets, handy dressing sheds, and equally handy refreshment facilities". In addition, Beerburrum had a management committee that met weekly.

In a first-round game North Arm defeated Nambour 12–1. It was subsequently discovered that W Allison was still registered with his Brisbane club, Caledonians and not a registered North Arm player. The Queensland Football Association deducted 2 points from North Arm and awarded them to Nambour. North Arm appealed the decision.

Details are lacking but North Arm won the 1923 premiership (and the newly minted Power Cup); their 3rd premiership in a row. However Mapleton protested against North Arm being awarded the 1923 Power Cup for undisclosed reasons, and this required NCFA intervention. A North Arm shopkeeper, Mrs AE Plint, also awarded the team a silver cup.

In April 1923 it was announced that Mr LA Robinson of the Ocean View Hotel, Mapleton had donated a cup, to be called the Robinson Charity Cup. The Robinson Charity Cup was played after the completion of Power Cup (premiership) fixtures. The inaugural Robinson Charity Cup Final was played on Saturday 6 October between North Arm and Mapleton at the Nambour Showgrounds with North Arm winning 2–0. All proceeds from the game were donated to "Hospital funds".

In May in a match report of the Buderim-North Arm game won by North Arm 5–0, The Telegraph newspaper revealed Buderim's nickname and team colours – the "dark blues".

=== North Coast v New Zealand, Nambour June 1923 ===
In June 1923 a North Coast representative side played the touring New Zealand side at the Nambour Showgrounds. New Zealand won the game 2–0.

This game was played on Wednesday 6 June in preparation for New Zealand's game against Australia on Saturday, 9 June at the Brisbane Cricket Ground. The New Zealand team left Brisbane aboard the McKeen Car (railway) at 9:00 am on the morning of the game and arrived at Nambour at 11:40 am. After an official welcome at the Royal Hotel, lunch at the Commercial Hotel and a tour of the Moreton Sugar Mill, the New Zealand team arrived at the Nambour Showgrounds at 2:45 pm in readiness for a 3:15 pm kick-off.

A large crowd was in attendance helped by the declaration of a public holiday to mark the occasion. Crowd estimates varied widely; the local newspaper the Nambour Chronicle & North Coast Advertiser suggested a crowd of between 800 and 900 whilst The Week newspaper declared "A record crowd of 2,000 ...".

The North Coast team, which played in red and black vertical stripes was:

- A Wardlaw (Goalkeeper), G Rae, S Pack (Captain), S Bray, A White, R Wardlaw, J Cutmore, W Bratten, W Buck, W Allison and N Cowley.

The New Zealand team played in black and white. The referee was Mr W Donellan and the linesmen were Mr E Middleton and ? Brown.

In the 15th minute, tragedy struck when the North Coast's S Bray was carried off with a broken right ankle suffered in a tackle. Bray watched the remainder of the game from the ambulance transport wagon. A collection for Bray was taken up at the ground and later forwarded to him. At the after-game banquet it was revealed that Bray was young farmer with a wife and 2 young children.

Although New Zealand dominated the first half the score was 0–0 at half-time. The North Coast side had their opportunities in the second half, but goals by Dacre and Balk gave New Zealand a 2–0 win.

The after-game banquet including speeches and toasts was held at Geddes Cafe. One local speaker complimented the North Coast players on their skill and spirit, and explained their lack of combination by noting that some of the North Coast players lived 40 miles from Nambour.

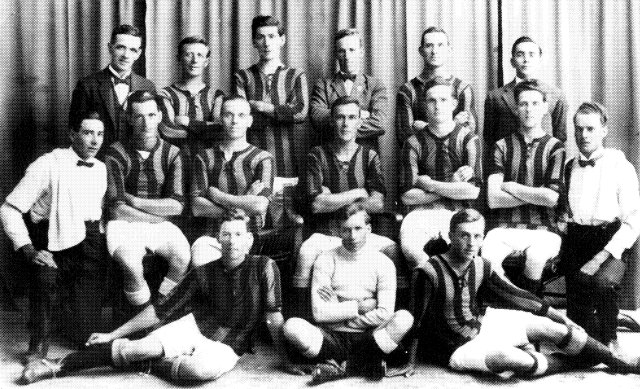
North Coast Representative Team that played New Zealand at Nambour Showgrounds, June 1923

== 1924 season ==
In February 1924 the annual meeting of the North Coast Football Association (NCFA) was held at Wells Cafe, Nambour. The meeting described the 1923 season, which included hosting a game between the North Coast representative side and New Zealand at the Nambour Showgrounds, as "the most successful" in the history of North Coast soccer. The meeting noted the 1923 season comprised 8 clubs and 169 registered players:

- 1. Beerburrum – 32 players
- 2. Nambour – 26
- 3. Kenilworth – 24
- 4. Mapleton – 21
- 5. Kidaman (Creek) – 18
- 6. North Arm – 18
- 7. Obi Obi – 15
- 8. Buderim – 15

Despite strong registration numbers in 1923, Beerburrum, Kidaman (Creek) and Nambour did not enter teams in 1924. A new club Mooloolah, which absorbed several players from Beerburrum, entered a team for the first time in 1924. An official B-Grade competition was formed.

6 clubs participated in the A-Grade competition – Buderim, Kenilworth, Mapleton, Mooloolah, North Arm and Obi Obi.

In their first season Obi Obi won both the A-Grade (Power Cup) and B-Grade (winning the inaugural Secretary's Cup) premierships, with North Arm retaining the Robinson Charity Cup. The gate money from the Robinson Charity Cup was divided between the new Nambour Hospital and the Queensland Ambulance Transport Brigade (QATB).

== 1925 season ==
At the North Coast Soccer Association annual meeting in March 1925 at the White Rose Cafe, Nambour, the following officials were elected:

- Patron – Mr JF Power
- President – Mr SJ Hobson
- Honorary Secretary & Treasurer – Mr AG Eggleton
- Vice-Presidents – Mr JF Baldry, Mr T Cheetham, Mr LA Robinson, Mr AW Thynne, Mr JF Tennant (possibly Tennant)

6 clubs competed in A-Grade for the Power Cup – Buderim, Kenilworth, Mapleton, Mooloolah, North Arm and Obi Obi, although it appears that Kenilworth withdrew from the competition during the season due to "travelling such long distances ...".

At a March meeting of the Buderim club, it was agreed the previous season's club colours of royal blue and white be retained for the 1925 season.

There were moves to form a club in Pomona following the withdrawal of the local rugby league team from North Coast Rugby League.

In July 1925 "Wire Tapper" published an ode to Sid Pack, a Mapleton player in the Nambour Chronicle & North Coast Advertiser:

Odious Odes to North Coast Soccer Celebrities – S Pack (Mapleton)

by "Wire Tapper"

When clearing his lines, and calling "back-up,"

He prosecutes soccer with vigour and zest,

He's a glutton for work, and never gives up,

But labours unceasing, with never a rest,

To term him courageous is no idle kid,

For the heart of a lion is embedded in Sid.

== 1926 season ==
The North Arm club did not re-form for the 1926 season.

In early-May employees of the Noosa Shire Council working on the Cooroy-Tewantin road formed the Cooroy Soccer Club with Mr P Peters being elected president and Mr C Wheatley Honorary Secretary. Cooroy entered the NCFA A-Grade competition and played some of their home games at Tewantin Recreation Reserve.

6 clubs contested the Power Cup and Robinson Charity Cup competitions – Buderim, Cooroy, Kenilworth, Mapleton, Mooloolah and Obi Obi.

Kenilworth won the premiership (Power Cup).

The Robinson Charity Cup Final between Cooroy and Buderim was delayed a week when the lorry transporting the Buderim team to the game broke down. The Cup was eventually won by Cooroy 1–0.

== 1927 season ==
In May 1927 a club was formed at Eumundi, with Mr AC Smith elected as president and Mr P Perrett as secretary. Some of the Eumundi players (Buck, A Wardlaw) had played for the defunct North Arm club.

In May the Mapleton club was re-formed; Mr C Hassett was elected captain and Mr JH Rosser secretary.

Mapleton were unbeaten premiers (Power Cup).

== 1928 season ==
By the 1928 season the number of teams competing for the Power Cup had fallen to 5 – Buderim, Cooroy, Kenilworth, Kin Kin, Mapleton (unbeaten 1927 Premiers (Power Cup winners)).

Mapleton won the Robinson Charity Cup (referred to erroneously as the Robertson Cup) knock-out competition beating Kenilworth 2–0 at the Obi Obi grounds. The goal scorers for Mapleton were Bratton (misspelt as Bratten) with a penalty and Moon. Jack Cutmore Senior was the referee.

== 1929 season ==
A soccer team was formed in Maleny and played games against Obi Obi and Kidaman Creek.

The president of the Association was Ernest Middleton.

== 1930 season ==
In March 1930 a soccer team was formed at Glasshouse Mountains.

== 1933 season ==
The Buderim club was re-formed and it appears there was a competition between clubs from "Beerwah to North Arm".

Obi Obi-Kenilworth defeated Amamoor 2–0 in the Charity Cup (presumably the Robinson Charity Cup); the goalscorers being J Burrows and P Campbell.

The Glasshouse Football Club didn't affiliate with the North Coast Football Association or play in its competitions, but regularly played games against Brisbane opposition on a social basis. The last game of the season was against a team of Brisbane referees. Mr Ross, the President of the Brisbane Referee's Association presented the local club with the ball used in the Australia-New Zealand test match played in June at the Brisbane Exhibition Ground, and won by Australia 4 – 2.

== 1935 ==
The Glasshouse Soccer Football Club continued to play social games against Brisbane clubs. In April 1935 Glasshouse suffered "the worst defeat in the history of the club", beaten 9–1 by United Rangers (of Brisbane). The goal scorer for Glasshouse was SJ Collings.

There is no evidence from newspapers of the time that the North Coast Football Association and its competition still exist.

== Summary – 1921 to 1936 ==
Season	Participating clubs	A-Grade Premiers (Power Cup from 1923 onwards)	B-Grade Premiers	Robinson Charity Cup Winners (played from 1923 onwards)
1921	4 – Buderim, Mapleton, North Arm, Palmwoods	North Arm		
1922	5 – Beerburrum, Buderim, Mapleton, North Arm, Palmwoods	North Arm		
1923	6 – Beerburrum, Buderim, Kenilworth, Mapleton, Nambour, North Arm	North Arm		North Arm
1924	6 – Buderim, Kenilworth, Mapleton, Mooloolah, North Arm, Obi Obi	Obi Obi	Obi Obi	North Arm
1925	6 – Buderim, Kenilworth, Mapleton, Mooloolah, North Arm, Obi Obi	Obi Obi	Buderim or Obi Obi	Buderim or Obi Obi
1926	6 – Buderim, Cooroy, Kenilworth, Mapleton, Mooloolah, Obi Obi	Kenilworth		Cooroy
1927	Buderim, Cooroy, Eumundi, Kenilworth, Mapleton, Obi Obi	Mapleton		Kin Kin
1928	5 – Buderim, Cooroy, Kenilworth, Kin Kin, Mapleton	Kin Kin		Mapleton
1929	Kenilworth, Kidaman Creek Maleny	Kenilworth		Goomboorian
1930	Amamoor, Obi Obi. Kenilworth, Goomboorian			Goomboorian tbc
1931	Mapleton, Obi Obi, Kenilworth, Goomboorian	Goomboorian		
1932				
1933	Amamoor, Obi Obi-Kenilworth	Obi Obi-Kenilworth		Obi Obi-Kenilworth
1934	Kidaman Creek, Obi Obi			

== 1938 season ==
The Glasshouse Mountains Rangers Soccer Football Club continued to play against Brisbane teams on what appeared to be a social basis. The club's annual report showed that Glasshouse Mountains had played 16 games for the season, winning 4, drawing 5, losing 7 whilst scoring 30 goals and conceding 44. The leading scorers were Norm Wilson 7 and George Pike 6.

== 1939 season ==
The Glasshouse Mountains Soccer Football Club annual ball was well-attended "notwithstanding a number of young men being away on war duties". Trophies were presented to:

- Most Improved Senior – Mr W Hoyle
- Most Unselfish Player – Mr George Morgan
- Most Consistent Senior – Mr Jack Morgan
- Most Consistent Junior ("F Shaw" Trophy) – Mr Dick Gowen
- Most Improved Junior ("CE Bourke" Trophy) – Mr H Proctor

== 1949 Attempts to Re-Commence Association Football ==
In August 1949 Mr JC Watson of Nambour put a notice in the Nambour Chronicle and North Coast Advertiser seeking interest in starting up Association Football (Soccer) in the district.

== 1968 revival ==
In early-1968 the Caloundra rugby league team was training in preparation for entry into North Coast Rugby League (NCRL) competitions. However, when their 2 delegates, Bob Hartley and Bruce Brinkley, arrived back from a special meeting of the NCRL in Nambour they had bad news; the NCRL would not accept Caloundra into its competitions. They decided to play soccer, Caloundra Soccer Club was formed and organised football was revived on the North Coast after a more than 30-year hiatus.

Hartley and Brinkley managed to form a team in the Woombye area, and within a few weeks the first game was played between Woombye and Caloundra, although it is unclear where this game was played. These games continued every Sunday, alternating between Henzell Park (Caloundra) and the Woombye Sportsground.

The North Coast Soccer Association was formed soon afterwards, comprising:

- President – Jock Graham, a Woombye shopkeeper, who had a significant role in forming the Woombye club
- Secretary – Nigel Grey, who was also Secretary of the Caloundra club
- Treasurer – Clive Fenn, a Caloundra jeweller, who was also Treasurer of the Caloundra club

With only 2 clubs it was difficult to start a competition. Caloundra had very good numbers, many of whom came from the Maroochydore area. Under the guidance of the Caloundra committee, these players plus some from Caloundra formed the Maroochydore club. A few weeks later, Jim and Peter Nicopoulos from Beerwah were at Caloundra watching the Caloundra – Woombye game. They were immediately recruited to play for Caloundra. After several weeks playing for Caloundra, Jim and Peter were asked if there were any more players in the Beerwah-Glasshouse area. The following Sunday, Jim and Peter turned up to Maroochydore with 15 players, and the Beerwah-Glasshouse United team was formed. The Beerwah-Glasshouse United team was formed before the club was formed on 31 July 1968.

=== 1968 season ===
The first season of the revived competition comprised 4 clubs – Caloundra, Woombye, Maroochydore and Beerwah-Glasshouse United. After some pre-season friendlies the first season comprised 2 rounds (6 fixtures per club) although there are suggestions there were 3 rounds (9 fixtures per club). Reporting in the local newspaper, The Nambour Chronicle, suggest that only 5 fixtures were played in this revival season. Games were played as double-headers and alternated around the club's home grounds:

- Caloundra – Henzell Park
- Woombye – Woombye Sportsground
- Maroochydore – Cotton Tree Oval
- Beerwah-Glasshouse United – Glasshouse Mountains Sportsground

Jersey colours were:

- Caloundra – red
- Woombye – white
- Maroochydore – maroon (in T-shirts supplied by the Caloundra club). There are suggestions that Maroochydore's colours were yellow.
- Beerwah-Glasshouse United – all green (they played in rugby league jumpers for the first season)

Beerwah-Glasshouse United (referred to in The Nambour Chronicle as simply Beerwah) were undefeated premiers in the 1968 season and were presented with the NCSA (North Coast Soccer Association) shield by the NCSA president, Jock Graham. There was also a finals series played culminating in a Beerwah-Glasshouse United – Woombye grand final at Henzell Park, Caloundra. Beerwah-Glasshouse United defeated Woombye 5–0 to clinch the premiership-championship double. Goalscorers for Beerwah-Glasshouse United were Mario Cuccuru, Tony Civico, Fidel Fernandez and Ken Fullerton (2).

During the 1968 season 2 trophies were donated to the NCSA, to be played for annually. The NCSA treasurer, Clive Fenn donated the Clive Fenn Cup and the Superintendent of the Caloundra Ambulance donated the Ambulance Cup. Beerwah-Glasshouse United won the inaugural Clive Fenn Cup.

==== 1968 North Coast Soccer Association – final table & finals ====
Position	Club	Played	Won	Drew	Lost	For	Against	Points	1968 finals	Results & venues	Goalscorers
Premiers	Beerwah	5	5	0	0	13	2	10	Semi-final (1st v 4th)	Beerwah 10 defeated Caloundra 2	Beerwah – Unknown Caloundra – Unknown
2nd	Woombye	5	2	0	3	17	16	4	Semi-final (2nd v 3rd)	Woombye 7 defeated Maroochydore 0	Woombye – Charlie Rocker (5), Peter Cox Junior (2)
3rd	Maroochydore	5	2	0	3	8	13	4	Grand final	Beerwah 5 defeated Woombye 0 @ Henzell Park, Caloundra	Beerwah – Ken Fullerton (2), Mario Cuccuru, Tony Civico, Fidel Fernandez
4th	Caloundra	5	1	0	4	7	14	2			

Ref:

== 1969—Introduction of Juniors ==
Cup Competitions	Result & Venue	Goalscorers
Ambulance Cup	Beegees 1 defeated Woombye 1 on corners (1–0) after extra time (1–1 at full-time) @ Henzell Park	Beegees – Jim Nicopoulos Woombye – Peter Slade
Clive Fenn Cup	Woombye 4 defeated Beegees 0 @ Glasshouse Mts Sportsground	Woombye – Ray Murdoch (hat-trick), Wilf Pitcher

=== 1969 Final Table & Finals ===
Position	Club	Played	Won	Drew	Lost	For	Against	Points	1969 Finals	Result & Venue	Goalscorers
Premiers	Beegees No 1	12	10	0	2	43	9	20	Minor semi-final (3rd v 4th)	Caloundra defeated Beegees No 2 & Maroochydore on forfeit	
2nd	Woombye	12	9	0	3	59	18	18	Major semi-final (1st v 2nd)	Beegees 3 defeated Woombye 1 @ Cotton Tree Oval, Maroochydore	Beegees – Barry Fullerton, Fidel Fernandez, Own goal Woombye – Charlie Rocker
3rd	Caloundra	12	7	1	4	39	24	15	Preliminary final	Caloundra 5 defeated Woombye 0 @ Woombye Sportsground	Caloundra – Unknown
4th	Beegees No 2	12	2	0	10	16	70	4	Grand final	Caloundra 2 defeated Beegees 1 @ Henzell Park, Caloundra	Caloundra – Jim Nipperess (2) Beegees – Own goal
5th	Maroochydore	12	1	1	10	13	49	3			

Ref:

== 1970 – Woombye wins first trophies (including Premiership-Grand final double) & introduction of Reserve Grade ==
In 1970 Woombye won its first trophies in senior football including a clean sweep of the A Grade trophies on offer:

- President's Shield
- Clive Fenn Cup (defeating Caloundra 8–0 in the final with Charlie Rocker scoring 6 goals)
- Ambulance Cup
- Premiership
- Grand final/Championship

The only trophies to elude Woombye were the inaugural Reserve Grade premiership and championship (for winning the grand final) which were both won by Caboolture.

Cup Competitions	Result & Venue	Goalscorers
Ambulance Cup	Woombye 3 defeated Beegees 0 after extra time (0–0 at full-time) @ Henzell Park, Caloundra	Woombye – Wilf Pitcher, Bernie Cox, Horst Rocker (penalty)
Clive Fenn Cup	Woombye 8 defeated Caloundra 0 @ Woombye Sportsground	Woombye – Charlie Rocker (6), Ray Murdoch, Mac Townson

=== 1970 – A Grade Final Table & Finals Results ===
Position	Club	Played	Won	Drew	Lost	For	Against	Points	1970 Finals	Results & Venues	Goalscorers
Premiers	Woombye	12	11	0	1	53	10	22	Minor semi-final (3rd v 4th)	Caloundra 2 defeated Maroochydore 1 @ Glasshouse Mts Sportsground	Caloundra – Allan Hopkinson (2) Maroochydore – Keith Johnson
2nd	Beegees	12	7	0	5	38	16	14	Major semi-final (1st v 2nd)	Woombye 4 defeated Beegees 2 @ Woombye Sportsgound	Woombye – Charlie Rocker (3), Helmut Rocker Beegees – Barry Fullerton (2)
3rd	Caloundra	12	4	0	8	27	35	8	Preliminary final	Beegees 2 defeated Caloundra 1 @ Cotton Tree Oval, Maroochydore	Beegees – Graham Dann (penalty), Tony Civico Caloundra – Allan Hopkinson
4th	Maroochydore	12	2	0	10	7	64	4	Grand final	Woombye 4 defeated Beegees 1 @ Woombye Sportsground	Woombye – Peter Cox Junior (2), Ray Murdoch, Charlie Rocker Beegees – Graham Dann (penalty)

Ref:

=== 1970 – Reserve Grade Final Table & Finals Results ===
In 1970 the North Coast Soccer Association introduced a Reserve Grade competition comprising 4 clubs playing a shortened season. The inaugural premiers and champions were Caboolture:

Position	Club	Played	Won	Drew	Lost	For	Against	Points
Premiers	Caboolture	6	4	2	0	26	8	10
2nd	Woombye	6	2	2	2	14	10	6 (+4)
3rd	Caloundra	6	2	2	2	11	11	6 (0)
4th	Maroochydore	6	1	0	5	8	33	2

== 1971 – Beegees win every grand final ==
Following Woombye's dominance of the 1970 season, Beegees appointed Graham Dann as captain-coach and recruited his brother Ray and cousin Kevin Dann from St Helens United club in Ipswich. Later in the season John Haswell would also be recruited from St Helens United. Ray Dann won the inaugural Charlie Rocker memorial award for the highest scorer in then North Coast football with at least 17 goals (this may be an underestimate as records are incomplete).

The 1971 grand finals were played on Sunday 19 September at Glasshouse Mts Sportsground. Beerwah-Glasshouse United (by now nicknamed Beegees) were represented in 6 grand finals and won all of them:

- Under 9 – Beegees 1 – Henzell Park Rangers 1 after extra time, Beegees won 6 – 5 on penalties
- Under 10 – Beegees 1 – Maroochydore 0
- Under 11 – Beegees 0 – Caloundra 0 after extra time, Beegees won 4 – 3 on penalties
- Under 13 – Beegees 1 – Caloundra 0
- Under 16 – Beegees 5 – Caloundra 0
- A Grade – Beegees 2 – Woombye 0

In the A Grade grand final the Graham Dann captain-coached Beegees were hot favourites after winning the premiership and going through the regular season undefeated. Goalscorers for Beegees were John Haswell and Kevin Dann. Beegees dominated the game to such an extent that the player of the grand final was Woombye defender Mac Townson. This was Beegees 2nd grand final (championship) victory.

=== 1971 A Grade – Final Table & Finals Results ===
Position	Club	Played	Won	Drew	Lost	For	Against	Points	1971 Finals	Results & Venues	Goalscorers
Premiers	Beegees (Undefeated)	12	9	3	0	49	12	21	Minor semi-final	Caloundra 9 defeated Maroochydore 1 @ Henzell Park, Caloundra	Caloundra – Unknown Maroochydore – Bryan Hopkinson
2nd	Woombye	12	6	3	3	39	27	15	Major semi-final	Beegees 4 defeated Woombye 1 @ Cotton Tree Oval, Maroochydore	Beegees – Unknown Woombye – Unknown
3rd	Caloundra	12	4	2	6	28	30	10	Preliminary final	Woombye 1 defeated Caloundra 0 @ Woombye Sportsground	Woombye – Chas Coombes
4th	Maroochydore	12	1	0	11	12	59	2	Grand final	Beegees 2 defeated Woombye 0 @ Glasshouse Mountains Sportsground	Beegees – John Haswell, Kevin Dann

== 1972 – New clubs: Redcliffe, Buderim & Maleny ==
In 1972 the Sunshine Coast Soccer Association admitted 3 new clubs; Redcliffe (seniors), Buderim (juniors) and Maleny (juniors). These new clubs brought the total number of teams to 43 including for the first time in the modern era 6 senior teams following the 'surprise' inclusion of Redcliffe. Woombye fielded 2 senior teams, Woombye White who would go through the season as undefeated Premiers, and Woombye Blue who won 1 game and the wooden spoon.

There were some lopsided scores in seniors with Woombye Blue and Maroochydore both forfeiting games and conceding a lot of goals. In their Round 2 game against Woombye White, Maroochydore were beaten 15–0.

=== 1972 – A Grade table ===
Position	Club	Played	Won	Drew	Lost	For	Against	Points	1972 A Grade Finals	Results & Venues	Goalscorers
Premiers	Woombye White (Undefeated)	10	9	1	0	65	11	19	Minor semi-final (3rd v 4th)	Caloundra 4 defeated Beegees 1 @ Woombye Sportsground	Caloundra – Horst Rocker (4) Beegees – Russell Amy
2nd	Redcliffe	10	7	0	3	29	26	14	Major semi-final (1st v 2nd)	Woombye White won on forfeit against Redcliffe due to "irregularities" (Redcliffe won 5–2) @ Glasshouse Mts Sportsground	Redcliffe – D Pitkeathly (3), J Van Dyke, M Schlotterbach Woombye White – Dick Watson, Chas Coombes
3rd	Caloundra	10	6	1	3	36	18	13	Preliminary final	Caloundra defeated Redcliffe on forfeit (Game not played)	
4th	Beegees	10	4	0	6	22	27	8	Grand final	Caloundra 4 defeated Woombye White 1 @ Cotton Tree Oval, Maroochydore	Caloundra – Horst Rocker (3), Jim Nipperess Woombye White – Dick Watson
5th	Maroochydore	10	2	0	8	14	54	4			
6th	Woombye Blue	10	1	0	9	8	38	2			

Ref:

== 1973 – Caloundra wins the Premiership-Grand final double ==
Position	Club	Played	Won	Drew	Lost	For	Against	Points	1973 Finals	Results & Venues	Goalscorers
Premiers	Caloundra	20	19	0	1	94	19	38	Minor semi-final (3rd v 4th)	Woombye Demons 3 defeated Beegees 2 after extra time @ Glasshouse Mts Sportsground	Woombye Demons – Unknown Beegees – Unknown
2nd	Maroochydore	20	10	1	9	37	48	21	Major semi-final (1st v 2nd)	Caloundra 7 defeated Maroochydore 0 @ Cotton Tree Oval, Maroochydore	Caloundra – Horst Rocker (3), Unknown
3rd	Beegees	20	10	1	9	43	45	21	Preliminary final	Maroochydore 6 defeated Woombye Demons 5 @ Woombye Sportsground	Maroochydore – Trevor Jones, Ian Jobson, Unknown Woombye Demons – Dick Watson (2), Unknown
4th	Woombye Demons	20	7	2	11	33	54	16	Grand final	Caloundra 4 defeated Maroochydore 1 @ Henzell Park, Caloundra	Caloundra – Dittman, Lex Hubner, Jim Nipperess (penalty), Horst Rocker Maroochydore – Own goal
5th	Redcliffe	20	6	2	12	44	39	14			
6th	Woombye Wolves	20	3	4	13	24	70	10			

== 1974 – New clubs: Nambour Reds, Mapleton & Noosa River ==
In 1974 the Sunshine Coast Soccer Association admitted 3 new clubs; Nambour Reds (seniors and juniors), Mapleton Rangers (juniors) and Noosa River (juniors). The inclusion of these clubs took the total number of junior and senior teams to 55 (an increase of 12 from 1973) and as the local press noted, about the same number as rugby league.

Nambour Reds, based at Yandina Sports Grounds, entered 2 senior teams (A Grade and Reserve Grade) and a junior team. Nambour Reds, as their name suggests, were based on Liverpool F.C. and wore an all "flame-red" strip. They were led by Ray DeCourcy (President) and Bill Saunders (Captain-Coach). By fielding 2 senior teams Nambour Reds helped to revive the Reserve Grade competition after a 2-year break. They met with early success with their A-Grade side being unbeaten after 7 rounds and leading the competition until late-July before player losses and injuries pushed them into a 4th-place finish. In the minor semi-final they were beaten 6–1 by Caloundra, the defending Premiers and Champions. The A Grade won the Clive Fenn Cup beating Woombye 2–1 in the final. The Reserve Grade side did even better winning the Premiership-Championship double, beating Caboolture 3–1 in the grand final and winning the Tarax Shield.

Mapleton Rangers were formed in March 1974 and played in purple shirts, white shorts and white socks. Mapleton's home ground was the Mapleton Sports Ground, where the Mapleton sides of the 1920s and 30s had played. Mapleton fielded 2 junior teams (Under 10's and Under 14's). Mapleton also established a senior team which played friendlies throughout 1974, in preparation for entering the Second Division competition in 1975.

Noosa River was formed in July 1973 and fielded 4 junior teams in 1974 (Under 8's, Under 10's, Under 12's and Under 14's). Noosa River played in brown and gold jerseys (brown and gold being the colours of Tewantin State School) and due to a lack of grounds played their home games at Jack Morgan Park, Coolum. Due to their homeground being located at Coolum, they were referred to as Noosa-Coolum in local newspapers. The inaugural president was John Hines.

=== 1974 – Division 1 Final Table * & Finals Results ===
Position	Club	Played	Won	Drew	Lost	For	Against	Points	1974 Finals	Results & Venues	Goalscorers
Premiers	Woombye	19	13	3	3	52	29	29	Minor semi-final (3rd v 4th)	Caloundra 6 defeated Nambour Reds 1 @ Cotton Tree Oval, Maroochydore	Caloundra – Jim Nipperess (2), Ray Murdoch (2), Cooper, Alan Parkinson Nambour Reds – Brian DeCourcy
2nd	Beegees	19	9	6	4	51	31	24 (+20)	Major semi-final (1st v 2nd)	Woombye 2 defeated Beegees 1 after extra time (1–1 at full-time) @ Glasshouse Mts Sportsground	Woombye – Ralph Goodwin, Helmut Rocker Beegees – Grant Thompson
3rd	Caloundra	19	10	4	5	43	45	24 (−2)	Preliminary final	Beegees 5 defeated Caloundra 1 @ Henzell Park, Caloundra	Beegees – Mick Evans (3), Lyle Bryce, Grant Thompson Caloundra – Jim Nipperess
4th	Nambour Reds	19	10	2	7	50	40	22	Grand final	Beegees 3 defeated Woombye 2 after extra time (2–2 at full-time) @ Cotton Tree Oval, Maroochydore	Beegees – Ken Fullerton, Phil Shaw, Mick Evans Woombye – Peter Cox Junior, Helmut Rocker
5th	Maroochydore	19	5	5	9	35	45	15			

Notes:

- Redcliffe withdrew from the competition after 4 rounds

== 1975 – Maroochydore win Premiership, Beegees win grand final ==
Cup Competitions	Result & Venues	Goalscorers
Clive Fenn Cup	Woombye defeated Caloundra on penalties (1–1 at full-time) @ Yandina Sportsground	Woombye – Peter Cox Junior Caloundra – Kim Cox
Ambulance Cup	Caloundra defeated Woombye on penalties (no scores available) @ Yandina Sportsground	Unknown

Position	Club	Played	Won	Drew	Lost	For	Against	Points	1975 Finals	Results & Venues	Goalscorers
Premiers	Maroochydore	20	12	4	4	65	26	28	Minor semi-final (3rd v 4th)	Beegees 2 drew with Woombye 2 after extra time (2–2 at full-time) @ Yandina Sportsground	Beegees – Grant Thompson, Unknown Woombye – Chas Coombes, Gerald Milne
2nd	Caloundra	20	11	3	6	54	38	25	Major semi-final (1st v 2nd)	Maroochydore 2 defeated Caloundra 0 @ Yandina Sportsground	Maroochydore – John Lesslie, Trevor Jones
3rd	Beegees	20	11	3	6	61	36	25	Minor semi-final Replay	Beegees 3 defeated Woombye 2 @ Cotton Tree Oval, Maroochydore	Unknown
4th	Woombye	20	9	3	8	48	30	21	Preliminary final	Beegees 1 defeated Caloundra 0 @ Cotton Tree Oval, Maroochydore	Beegees – Lyle Bryce
5th	Nambour Reds	20	9	2	9	64	58	20	Grand final	Beegees 4 defeated Maroochydore 2 @ Glasshouse Mts Sportsground	Beegees – Own goal, Lyle Bryce (2), Phil Shaw Maroochydore – Trevor Jones, Chris Missios
6th	Bribie Island	20	0	1	19	17	121	1			

== 1976 – New clubs: Bribie, Margate, Coolum & National Park Rovers & the death of Alan McMaster ==
The Redcliffe senior team dropped out of the A Grade competition after 4 rounds of 1974; the initial 6-team competition of 1974 became 5 teams in 1975. In 1976 the Sunshine Coast Soccer Association (SCSA) admitted 2 new clubs to A Grade making it a 7-team competition; Bribie Island & curiously Margate (after the Redcliffe experiment had been so disastrous). The other A Grade clubs were Beerwah-Glasshouse United, Caloundra, Maroochydore, Nambour Reds & Woombye.

In 1976 the SCSA also admitted 3 new teams to the Reserve Grade competition; Noosa River, Coolum (a new club) & National Park Rovers (a new club based in Nambour). Noosa River were undefeated in winning the Reserve Grade premiership, but were beaten in the grand final 1–0 by a young National Park Rovers team. Goalscorer for National Park Rovers was Michael Ball. This would be National Park Rovers only title in their short existence.

In June 1976 Beegees were top of the A-Grade table; the only points dropped had been a home loss to Woombye in Round 8. The captain-coach was Alan McMaster, a wily and as hard-as-nails central defender hailing from Northern Ireland. McMaster had lived and worked locally for the past 3 years and had been part of Beegees grand final winning teams in 1974 (beating Woombye 3–2 after extra time) and 1975 (beating Maroochydore 4–2). In late-June Beegees beat Margate 9–2 to keep their premiership hopes on track. Tragically, driving back from Margate McMaster was badly injured in a car accident and transferred to Royal Brisbane Hospital. After a brave fight McMaster's life support system was turned off on Friday, 2 July 1976. As a mark of respect all clubs observed a minutes silence and wore black arm bands at their next fixtures. The young Beegees team easily won the premiership, but it all fell apart during the 1976 finals. A 4–2 major semi-final loss to Maroochydore was followed by a 1–0 preliminary final loss to Woombye as Beegees crashed out of the finals. Maroochydore won their first grand final and the 1976 championship by beating Woombye 2–0 in the grand final at Glasshouse in front of more than 2,000 spectators. Goalscorers for Maroochydore were Milton Hasthorpe and Trevor Jones.

1976 Finals	Results & Venues	Goalscorers
Minor semi-final (3rd v 4th)	Woombye 2 defeated Caloundra 1 after extra time (1–1 at full-time) @ Yandina Sportsground	Woombye – Helmut Rocker, Horst Rocker Caloundra – Unknown
Major semi-final (1st v 2nd)	Maroochydore 4 defeated Beegees 2 @ Yandina Sportsground	Maroochydore – Chris Dunk, John Lesslie, Trevor Jones, Peter Orkild Beegees – Lyle Bryce, Grant Thompson (penalty)
Preliminary final	Woombye 1 defeated Beegees 0 @ Glasshouse Mts Sportsground	Woombye – Brian DeCourcy
Grand final	Maroochydore 2 defeated Woombye 0 @ Glasshouse Mts Sportsground	Maroochydore – Milton Hasthorpe, Trevor Jones

== 1977 – visit by German Amateur Club, FC Traisa ==
In June 1977 FC Traisa visited Queensland and played games against Brisbane and Sunshine Coast opposition. They beat Brisbane First Division club Southside Eagles, who have German heritage, 5–2 the weekend before they took on a Sunshine Coast representative side. On an "extremely cold night" at Glasshouse Mountains Sports Ground and in front of more than 1,000 spectators, FC Traisa defeated the Sunshine Coast 5–3. Goalscorers for the Sunshine Coast were Ken McClean (2) and Steve Dobinson.

The Sunshine Coast Soccer Association reported a total of 72 affiliated teams for the 1977 season including 57 junior teams and 15 senior teams.

=== 1977 finals series ===
1977 finals	Results & venues	Goalscorers
Minor semi-final (3rd v 4th)	Noosa River 5 defeated Caloundra 2 @ Yandina Sportsground	Noosa River – Alan Dobinson (2), Price (2), Horst Rocker Caloundra – Gordon Cooper (2)
Major semi-final (1st v 2nd)	Beegees 2 defeated Nambour Reds 1 @ Yandina Sportsground	Beegees – Phil Shaw, Terry Beavis Nambour Reds – Brian DeCourcy (penalty)
Preliminary final	Noosa River 5 defeated Nambour Reds 2 @ Woombye Sportsground	Noosa River – Horst Rocker (2 including a penalty), Dave Ripley, Roberts, Steve Dobinson Nambour Reds – Ken McLean, Bill Saunders
Grand final	Beegees 2 defeated Noosa River 1 @ Glasshouse Mts Sportsground	Beegees – Lyle Bryce, Own goal Noosa River – Horst Rocker (penalty)

== 1978 finals series ==
In June 1978 Noosa opened their new grounds at Sir Thomas Hiley Park, Tewantin with a full day of junior and senior fixtures culminating in the A Grade game between Noosa and Caloundra. The A Grade game ended in a 3–3 draw and was notable for the "ferocious tackling" and for Noosa scoring 3 first half goals before conceding 3 goals in 5 minutes early in the second half.

1978 Cup Competitions	Result & Venues	Goalscorers
Tarax Shield (Reserve Grade)	Beegees 6 defeated Caloundra 0 @ Glasshouse Mts Sportsground	Unknown
Clive Fenn Cup (A Grade)	Maroochydore 4 defeated Caloundra 3 after extra time (3–3 at full-time) @ Glasshouse Mts Sportsground	Unknown
Ambulance Cup		Unknown

1978 Finals	Results & Venues	Goalscorers
Minor semi-final (3rd v 4th)	Noosa 2 drew with Caloundra 2 after extra time (2–2 at full-time) @ Woombye Sportsground	Noosa – Mick Hunt, Horst Rocker (penalty) Caloundra – Mohan, Mick Gandolfo
Major semi-final (1st v 2nd)	Maroochydore 3 defeated Beegees 1 @ Yandina Sportsgound	Maroochydore – John Lesslie, Ken McLean, Peter Deeks Beegees – Mick Evans
Minor semi-final Replay	Noosa 2 defeated Caloundra 1 @ Woombye Sportsground	Noosa – Mick Hunt, Steve Dobinson Caloundra – Mick Gandolfo
Preliminary final	Beegees 2 defeated Noosa 1 @ Central Park, Caloundra	Beegees – Neil Beavis (penalty), David White Noosa – Horst Rocker (penalty)
Grand final	Beegees 2 defeated Maroochydore 1 @ Glasshouse Mts Sportsground	Beegees – Lyle Bryce, Unknown Maroochydore – Peter Deeks

== 1979 finals series ==
1979 Finals	Results & Venues	Goalscorers
Minor semi-final (3rd v 4th)	Woombye 5 defeated Caloundra 3 @ Sir Thomas Hiley Park, Tewantin	Woombye – Ian Proud (hat-trick), Horst Rocker (penalty), Ivor Lovewell Caloundra – Mark Cooper, Brett Long (penalty), Own goal
Major semi-final (1st v 2nd)	Beegees 4 defeated Buderim 3 @ Sir Thomas Hiley Park, Tewantin	Beegees – Lyle Bryce (2 including a penalty), David White, Unknown Buderim – Col Smith (2), Ken McLean
Preliminary final	Buderim 1 drew with Woombye 1 @ Woombye Sportsground	Buderim – Peter Deeks Woombye – Ian Proud
Preliminary final Replay	Buderim 6 defeated Woombye 2 @ Woombye Sportsground	Buderim – Peter Deeks (hat-trick including a penalty), Col Smith, Steve Anger, Harry Bushell Woombye – Horst Rocker (2 including a penalty)
Grand final	Beegees 4 defeated Buderim 0 @ Glasshouse Mts Sportsground	Beegees – Lyle Bryce (4 including a penalty)

== 1980—Beegees win Premiership, Buderim win grand final ==
Position	Club	Played	Won	Drew	Lost	For	Against	Points	1980 Finals	Result & Venue	Goalscorers
Premiers	Beegees	20	17	2	1			36	Minor semi-final (3rd v 4th)	Buderim 3 defeated Gympie Diggers 1 @ Woombye Sportsgound	Buderim – Ken McLean, Ken Green (penalty), Darryl Cook Gympie Diggers – Peter Cox Junior (penalty)
2nd	Noosa	20	15	1	4			31	Major semi-final (1st v 2nd)	Noosa 3 defeated Beegees 0 @ Sir Thomas Hiley Park, Tewantin	Noosa – Horst Rocker, Mick Hunt, Tim O'Maye
3rd	Buderim	20	10	4	6			24	Preliminary final	Buderim 1 defeated Beegees 0 @ Ballinger Park, Buderim	Buderim – Col Smith
4th	Gympie Diggers	20	9	3	8			21	Grand final	Buderim 2 defeated Noosa 1 @ Glasshouse Mts Sportsground	Buderim – Col Smith, Ken McLean Noosa – Horst Rocker
5th	Woombye	20	7	2	11			16			
6th	Caloundra	20	5	3	12			13			
7th	Maroochydore	20	5	2	13			12			
8th	Nambour Reds	20	3	1	16			7			

Ref:

== 1981 – Noosa win A & Reserve Grade Premiership-Grand final doubles, introduction of Colts & 3rd Division ==
Noosa entered senior football in 1976 winning the Reserve Grade premiership in their first season, and being promoted to A Grade in 1977 where they finished third and were beaten 2–1 in the grand final by Beegees. Noosa made the 1980 grand final but were again beaten, this time 2–1 by Buderim.

In 1981 Noosa created Sunshine Coast football history by becoming the first club to win the premiership-grand final double in both A and Reserve Grades.

In A Grade the Alan Sinclair captain-coached Noosa won their first A Grade premiership by a convincing 5 points from Woombye, whilst in Reserve Grade they won their third premiership by 2 points from Caboolture.

In the finals both Noosa sides lost their major semi-finals and had to take the long route to their grand finals. The Noosa A Grade side made the grand final after playing 3 gruelling finals games in 7 days; drawing 2–2 in their major semi-final with Woombye on the Sunday, losing the major semi-final replay 2–0 on the Tuesday night before beating Beegees 2–1 in the preliminary final on the Sunday.

In the A Grade grand final at Glasshouse Mts Sportsground in front of a crowd of more than 3,000 it was Woombye's Paul Lees who scored first after a defensive mix-up in the Noosa goalmouth. Bob Chalmers equalised for Noosa after a "brilliant solo run" and Tim O'Maye put Noosa ahead 2–1 at half-time with a "great piece of individual play". In the second half, Noosa with their superior fitness and assisted by injuries to key Woombye players, were able to hang on and win their first A Grade grand final.

In the Reserve Grade grand final Noosa scored 3 first half goals against Caboolture, eventually winning 4–2.

The grand final teams in A Grade were:

Position	Noosa	Woombye
Goalkeeper	Tumby Mariattan	Mark Daines
2	John Murphy	David Simpson
3	Peter Cousins	Brian DeCourcy
4	Mick Hunt	David Currie
5	Andy Clark	Lex Roberts
6	Alan Sinclair (Captain/Coach)	Peter Bartles
7	Tony Dobinson	Jeff Hayden
8	Alan Dobinson	Paul Lees
9	Tim O'Maye	Neil Daines
10	Noel Telfer	Terry Daveson
11	Bob Chalmers	Richard McCallum (Captain)

=== 1981 – A Grade Final Table & Finals ===
Position	Club	Played	Won	Drew	Lost	For	Against	Points	1981 A Grade Finals	Results & Venues	Goalscorers
Premiers	Noosa	19	14	2	3	55	16	30	Minor semi-final (3rd v 4th)	Beegees 2 defeated Buderim 0 @ Woombye Sportsgound	Beegees – David White, Ian Brown
2nd	Woombye	19	12	1	6	47	28	25	Major semi-final (1st v 2nd)	Noosa 2 drew with Woombye 2 @ Sir Thomas Hiley Park, Tewantin	Noosa – Noel Telfer (2) Woombye – Tim Dickson, Paul Lees (penalty)
3rd	Beegees	19	6	9	4	36	26	21	Major semi-final Replay	Woombye 2 defeated Noosa 0 @ Ballinger Park, Buderim	Woombye – Unknown
4th	Buderim	19	7	7	5	36	33	21	Preliminary final	Noosa 2 defeated Beegees 1 @ Ballinger Park, Buderim	Noosa – John Murphy (penalty), Tim O'Maye Beegees – Phil Shaw
5th	Nambour Reds	19	8	3	8	34	41	19	Grand final	Noosa 2 defeated Woombye 1 @ Glasshouse Mts Sportsgound	Noosa – Bob Chalmers, Tim O'Maye Woombye – Paul Lees
6th	Caloundra	19	5	5	9	26	39	15			
7th	Gympie Diggers	19	6	3	10	23	30	15			
8th	Maroochydore	19	2	2	15	19	63	6			

=== 1981 – Reserve Grade Final Table & Finals ===
Position	Club	Played	Won	Drew	Lost	For	Against	Points	1981 Reserve Grade Finals	Results & Venues
Premiers	Noosa	17	15	1	1			31	Minor semi-final (3rd v 4th)	Coolum 3 defeated Beegees 0 @ Woombye Sportsground
2nd	Caboolture	17	14	1	2			29	Major semi-final (1st v 2nd)	Caboolture 5 defeated Noosa 2 @ Sir Thomas Hiley Park, Tewantin
3rd	Beegees	17	12	1	4			25	Preliminary final	Noosa defeated Coolum @ Ballinger Park, Buderim
4th	Coolum	17	10	2	5			22	Grand final	Noosa 4 defeated Caboolture 2 @ Glasshouse Mts Sportsgound
5th	Caloundra	18	10	1	7			21		
6th	Buderim	17	9	1	7			19		
7th	Gympie Diggers	18	9	1	8			19		
8th	Nambour Reds	17	3	3	11			9		
9th	Maroochydore	17	2	2	13			6		
10th	Kawana	17	2	1	14			5		
11th	Woombye	18	1	2	15			5		

=== 1981 – Introduction of Colts & 3rd Division ===
In 1981 the Sunshine Coast Soccer Association registered 1,823 players in 108 teams:

- Juniors – 1,217 players in 73 teams
- Women – 149 players in 8 teams
- Seniors – 457 players in 27 teams
- Total – 1,823 players in 108 teams

In 1981 the Sunshine Coast Soccer Association introduced Colts (Under-18) and 3rd Division competitions to cater for the growth in playing numbers, retain juniors and older players. The Colts competition attracted 5 teams (Beegees, Buderim (although Buderim withdrew during the season), Caloundra, Maroochydore and Woombye) and the 3rd Division 4 teams (Bribie, Buderim, Coolum and Woombye). Games were played on Friday nights under lights.

The Premiers in Colts were Woombye with Caloundra winning the grand final. In 3rd Division the Premiers and Champions were Woombye.

=== 1981 – Colts Final Table & Finals Results ===
Position	Club	Played	Won	Drew	Lost	Goal Difference	Points	1981 Colts Finals	Results & Venues
Premiers	Woombye	18	12	4	2	+30	28	Minor semi-final (3rd v 4th)	Maroochydore 1 defeated Beegees 0 @ Cotton Tree Oval
2nd	Caloundra	18	11	4	3	+53	26	Major semi-final (1st v 2nd)	Woombye 1 drew with Caloundra 1 @ Woombye Sportsground
3rd	Maroochydore	18	6	5	7	−7	17	Major semi-final Replay	Caloundra 1 defeated Woombye 0 after extra time (0–0 at full-time) @ Ballinger Park, Buderim
4th	Beegees	18	3	3	12	−40	9	Preliminary final	Woombye 2 drew with Maroochydore 2 after extra time @ Glasshouse Mts Sportsground
5th	Buderim	Withdrew during season						Preliminary final Replay	Maroochydore 2 drew with Woombye 2 after extra time (Maroochydore won 5–4 on penalties) @ Ballinger Park, Buderim
								Grand final	Caloundra 4 defeated Maroochydore 0 @ Ballinger Park, Buderim

=== 1981 – 3rd Division Final Table & Finals Results ===
Position	Club	Played	Won	Drew	Lost	Goal Difference	Points	1981 3rd Division Finals	Results & Venues
Premiers	Woombye	20	12	5	3	+28	29	Minor semi-final (3rd v 4th)	Coolum 4 defeated Buderim 2 @ Cotton Tree Oval, Maroochydore
2nd	Bribie Island	20	11	5	4	+15	27	Major semi-final (1st v 2nd)	Woombye 8 defeated Bribie Island 2 @ Woombye Sportsground
3rd	Buderim	20	6	3	11	−20	15	Preliminary final	Bribie Island 7 defeated Coolum 3 @ Glasshouse Mts Sportsground
4th	Coolum	20	2	5	13	−42	9	Grand final	Woombye 2 defeated Bribie Island 0 @ Ballinger Park, Buderim

== 1982 – Beegees win Premiership-Grand final double ==
Position	Club	Played	Won	Drew	Lost	For	Against	Points	1982 Finals	Results & Venues	Goalscorers
Premiers	Beegees	20	17	0	3	63	18	34	Minor semi-final (3rd v 4th)	Buderim 2 drew with Woombye 2 @ Woombye Sportsgound	Buderim – Ken McLean, Paul Lees Woombye – Brian DeCourcy (penalty), Tim Dickson
2nd	Noosa	20	15	3	2	77	18	33	Major semi-final (1st v 2nd)	Beegees 1 drew with Noosa 1 @ Cotton Tree Oval, Maroochydore	Beegees – David Payne Noosa – Ross Maygar
3rd	Buderim	20	15	1	4	55	24	31	Minor semi-final Replay	Buderim 2 defeated Woombye 0 @ Woombye Sportsground	Buderim – Chris Dunk, Mark Steel
4th	Woombye	20	11	4	5	63	32	26	Major semi-final Replay	Beegees 2 defeated Noosa 1 @ Cotton Tree Oval, Maroochydore	Beegees – David Payne, David White Noosa – Bob Chalmers
5th	Caloundra	20	10	2	8	45	34	22	Preliminary final	Noosa 3 defeated Buderim 2 @ Ballinger Park, Buderim	Noosa – Tim O'Maye, Horst Rocker (penalty), Bob Chalmers Buderim – Chris Dunk, Ken McLean
6th	Redcliffe PCYC	20	10	2	8	40	28	22	Grand final	Beegees 2 drew with Noosa 2 @ Glasshouse Mts Sportsground	Beegees – David Payne, Phil Shaw Noosa – Mike Hunt, Horst Rocker (penalty)
7th	Gympie Diggers	20	11	0	9	35	53	22	Grand final Replay	Beegees 2 defeated Noosa 1 @ Glasshouse Mts Sportsground	Beegees – David Payne, Phil Shaw Noosa – Bob Chalmers
8th	Coolum	20	3	4	13	26	54	10			
9th	Kawana	20	3	2	15	18	66	8			
10th	Caboolture-Deception Bay	20	2	4	14	20	69	8			
11th	Maroochydore	20	1	2	17	14	81	4			

Ref:

== 1983 – Noosa wins Division 1 & Division 1 Reserves Premiership-Grand final double Following a Classic grand final ==
Position	Club	Played	Won	Drew	Loss	For	Against	Points	1983 Finals	Results & Venues	Goalscorers
Premiers	Noosa	16	13	2	1	94	13	28	Minor semi-final (3rd v 4th)	Beegees 4 defeated Woombye 2 @ Woombye Sportsground	Beegees – Warren Whisson (3), Alan Curtis Woombye – Brian DeCourcy, Peter Deeks
2nd	Buderim	16	12	3	1	61	19	27	Major semi-final (1st v 2nd)	Noosa 4 defeated Buderim 2 after extra time (2–2 at full-time) @ Central Park, Caloundra	Noosa – Tim O'Maye, Keith Foss, Steve Walsh (2 in extra time) Buderim – Mick Roberts (penalty), Paul Lees
3rd	Beegees	16	11	4	1	60	11	26	Preliminary final	Beegees 3 defeated Buderim 0 @ Glasshouse Mts Sportsground	Beegees – Warren Whisson (2), Jay Larkin
4th	Woombye	16	10	1	5	36	32	21	Grand final	Noosa 5 defeated Beegees 4 after extra time (4–4 at full-time) @ Ballinger Park, Buderim	Noosa – Steve Walsh (3 including a penalty), Unknown, Own goal Beegees – Warren Whisson (4 including a penalty)
5th	Kawana	16	6	2	8	31	55	14			
6th	Caloundra	16	4	1	11	23	51	9			
7th	Coolum	16	3	1	12	19	49	7			
8th	Caboolture	16	2	3	11	23	73	7			
9th	Gympie Diggers	16	2	1	13	19	63	5			

== 1984 – Woombye wins the Premiership-Grand final double with South American flair ==
Position	Club	Played	Won	Drew	Lost	For	Against	Points	1984 Finals	Results & Venues	Goalscorers
Premiers	Woombye	18	14	1	3	72	23	29	Minor semi-final (3rd v 4th)	Buderim 4 defeated Beegees 2 @ Woombye Sportsground	Buderim – Brett Stevens, Nicky Meredith (3 including a penalty) Beegees – Warren Whisson, David Payne
2nd	Noosa	18	13	2	3	79	18	28	Major semi-final (1st v 2nd)	Woombye 3 defeated Noosa 0 @ Sir Thomas Hiley Park, Tewantin	Woombye – Jeff Hayden (2), Brian DeCourcy
3rd	Beegees	18	11	3	4	76	23	25 (+53)	Preliminary final	Buderim 4 defeated Noosa 2 after extra time (2–2 at full-time) @ Ballinger Park, Buderim	Buderim – Nicky Meredith (2), Paul Lees, Ken McLean (penalty) Noosa – Bob Chalmers, Mick Hunt
4th	Buderim	18	11	3	4	54	26	25 (+28)	Grand final	Woombye 3 defeated Buderim 0 @ Glasshouse Mts Sportsground	Woombye – Lorenzo Olmedo, Brian DeCourcy, Own goal
5th	Caloundra	18	5	1	12	24	66	11			
6th	Gympie Diggers	18	4	0	14	26	57	8			
7th	Nambour Reds	18	0	0	18	3	123	0			

Ref:

== 1985 – Buderim wins nearly everything ... ==
Buderim originally entered Sunshine Coast Soccer Association competitions as a junior club in 1972. Buderim entered senior teams for the first time in 1979, winning the 1st Division premiership but being beaten 4–0 by Beegees in the grand final. In 1985 Buderim set new standards in Sunshine Coast football by winning:

- 1st Division Premiership, Grand final, Clive Fenn Cup, Qantas Cup
- 2nd Division Premiership
- Colts Premiership and grand final
- Junior Premierships in Under 11's, Under 14's
- Junior grand final in Under 14's

In the Clive Fenn Cup Knock-out Final Buderim defeated Woombye 2–0 at Ballinger Park, with goals in the last 10 minutes by Ian Brown and Brian DeCourcy.

In the 1st Division premiership the Kim Cox coached Buderim were unbeaten away and lost just 2 games at home to Noosa (lost 3–2) and Woombye (lost 1–3). Noosa lead the competition until the 19th round when they were beaten 2–1 by Buderim at Ballinger Park (Goalscorers – Buderim: Nicky Meredith, Ian Brown (penalty), Noosa: Steve Walsh) and in the final round were held to a surprising 4-all draw at home by Caloundra. Buderim thrashed Woombye 5–1 in their final game to win their 2nd premiership (Goalscorers – Buderim: Paul Lees, Tim O'Maye, Ian Brown, Nicky Meredith, own goal, Woombye: Anton Potappel).

In 2nd Division Buderim easily won the premiership by 7 points from 2nd placed Beegees, but were beaten 1–0 by Beegees in the grand final (Goalscorer – Barry Whisson). This was Beegees first 2nd Division grand final win.

In the Qantas Cup, a senior knock-out cup competition played by Brisbane and region clubs, Buderim defeated Broadbeach (Gold Coast) 1–0 in the final at Perry Park in Brisbane thanks to an Ian Brown goal in the last minute of extra-time. To reach the Qantas Cup Final Buderim defeated North Star (5th Division) 2–1, The Gap (2nd Division) won on penalties after extra time, Grange Thistle (6th Division) 3–1, Slacks Creek (1st Division) 2–2 after extra-time (won 5–4 on penalties), Bardon Latrobe (1st Division) 1–1 after extra-time (won 3–2 on penalties).

Position	Club	Played	Won	Drew	Lost	For	Against	Points	1985 1st Division Finals	Results & Venues	Goalscorers
Premiers	Buderim	20	14	4	2	77	19	46	Minor semi-final (3rd v 4th)	Beegees 2 defeated Woombye 0 at Yandina Sportsground	Beegees – Tom Strong, Mark Cooper
2nd	Noosa	20	13	5	2	66	26	44	Major semi-final (1st v 2nd)	Buderim 5 defeated Noosa 0 at Sir Thomas Hiley Park, Tewantin	Buderim – Ian Brown (2 including a penalty), Tim O'Maye, Paul Lees (2)
3rd	Beegees	20	8	7	5	37	35	31	Preliminary final	Noosa 2 defeated Beegees 0 at Glasshouse Mts Sportground	Noosa – Mick Hunt (2)
4th	Woombye	20	8	4	8	52	34	28	Grand final	Buderim 1 defeated Noosa 0 at Ballinger Park, Buderim	Buderim – Brian DeCourcy
5th	Caloundra	20	5	4	11	42	57	19			
6th	Maroochydore	20	0	0	20	11	114	0			

Ref:

== 1986 – Noosa win Premiership-Grand final double ==
Clive Fenn Cup	Goalscorers
Caloundra 2 defeated Beegees 1 after extra time (1–1 at full-time) @ Central Park, Caloundra	Caloundra – Steve Holden, Brett Landrigan Beegees – Paul Korczynski

Position	Club	Played	Won	Drew	Lost	For	Against	Points	1986 Finals	Results & Venues	Goalscorers
Premiers	Noosa	15	11	2	2	53	17	35	Minor semi-final (3rd v 4th)	Buderim 3 defeated Caloundra 0 @ Yandina Sportsground	Buderim – Mick Savage, Jeff Haydon, Paul Lees
2nd	Beegees	15	11	0	4	47	17	33	Major Sem-final (1st v 2nd)	Beegees 1 defeated Noosa 0 @ Sir Thomas Hiley Park, Tewantin	Beegees – Shane Scriggins
3rd	Buderim	15	5	3	7	32	30	18	Preliminary final	Noosa 1 drew with Buderim 1 after extra time (1–1 at full-time) @ Glasshouse Mts Sportsground	Noosa – Mick Hunt Buderim – Mike Savage
4th	Caloundra	15	4	4	7	28	35	16	Preliminary final Replay	Noosa 3 defeated Buderim 3 on penalties (4–3) (3–3 after extra time, 2–2 at full-time) @ Glasshouse Mts Sportsground	Noosa – Paul Chaplow (2), Sasha Boljevic Buderim – Neil Daines, Jeff Haydon, Paul Lees
5th	Woombye	15	3	4	8	23	41	13	Grand final	Noosa 3 defeated Beegees 0 @ Glasshouse Mts Sportsground	Noosa – Steve Walsh (hat-trick including a penalty)
6th	Maroochydore	15	2	5	8	17	60	11			

Ref:

== 1987 to 1993—Beegees win 7 consecutive Premierships ==
In 1987 Beegees won the first of 7 successive premierships, a record which stands to this day. On 5 occasions Buderim were the premiership runners-up. This golden period from 1987 to 1993 also produced 4 grand final victories (1987, 1989, 1992 and 1993).

Only Kawana which won 6 successive premierships from 2001 to 2006 has come close to equalling this record.

=== 1987—Beegees win Premiership-Grand final double ===
Position	Club	Played	Won	Drew	Lost	For	Against	Points	1987 1st Division Finals	Results & Venues	Goalscorers
Premiers	Beegees	15	11	3	1	47	11	36	Minor semi-final (3rd v 4th)	Noosa 3 defeated Maroochydore 0 @ Yandina Sportsground	Noosa – Bob Chalmers, Wayne Cooley, Warren Cooley
2nd	Buderim	15	8	5	2	30	19	29	Major semi-final (1st v 2nd)	Buderim 2 defeated Beegees 0 @ Central Park, Caloundra	Buderim – Scott Woods, Shaun DeCourcy
3rd	Noosa	15	6	1	8	22	20	19	Preliminary final	Beegees 2 defeated Noosa 1 @ Sir Thomas Hiley Park, Tewantin	Beegees – Steve Martin (2) Noosa – Wayne Cooley
4th	Maroochydore	15	4	3	8	18	37	15	Grand final	Beegees 3 defeated Buderim 2 @ Glasshouse Mts Sportsground	Beegees – David Payne (2), Steve Martin Buderim – Neil Daines, Paul Lees
5th	Caloundra	15	4	2	9	20	31	14			
6th	Woombye	15	3	4	8	16	35	13			

Ref:

=== 1988 – Beegees win 2nd successive Premiership, Noosa win grand final ===
Position	Club	Played	Won	Drew	Lost	For	Against	Points	1988 Finals	Results & Venues	Goalscorers
Premiers	Beegees	21	20	0	1	80	13	60	Minor semi-final (3rd v 4th)	Caloundra 1 defeated Maroochydore 0 @ Glasshouse Mts Sportsground	Caloundra – Peter English
2nd	Noosa	21	14	2	5	43	21	44	Major semi-final (1st v 2nd)	Beegees 2 defeated Noosa 1 @ Central Park, Caloundra	Beegees – Tony Bright, Dennis Radnedge Noosa – Garth Jones
3rd	Maroochydore	21	11	4	6	40	21	37	Preliminary final	Noosa 1 defeated Caloundra 0 @ Ballinger Park, Buderim	Noosa – Andy Parris
4th	Caloundra	21	9	5	7	33	25	32	Grand final	Noosa 3 defeated Beegees 1 @ Sir Thomas Hiley Park, Tewantin	Noosa – Ross Maygar, Garth Jones (2) Beegees – David Payne (penalty)
5th	Kawana	21	6	5	10	34	45	23			
6th	Woombye	21	6	0	15	31	66	18			
7th	Coolum	21	5	1	15	21	57	16			
8th	Buderim	21	3	3	15	25	59	12			

=== 1989 – Beegees win 3rd successive Premiership & Premiership-Grand final double ===
Position	Club	Played	Won	Drew	Lost	For	Against	Points	1989 Finals	Results & Venues	Goalscorers
Premiers	Beegees	21	14	6	1	49	15	48	Minor semi-final (3rd v 4th)	Caloundra 2 defeated Buderim 1 @ Sir Thomas Hiley Park, Tewantin	Caloundra – Brett Grambower, Peter English Buderim – Ken Glover
2nd	Noosa	21	13	5	3	52	30	44	Major semi-final (1st v 2nd)	Beegees 1 defeated Noosa 0 after extra time (0–0 at full-time) @ Yandina Sportsground	Beegees – Chris Fullerton
3rd	Buderim	21	9	5	7	32	19	32	Preliminary final	Noosa 2 defeated Caloundra 1 @ Ballinger Park, Buderim	Noosa – Jeff Haydon (2) Caloundra – Brett Grambower
4th	Caloundra	21	9	3	9	26	33	30	Grand final	Beegees 3 defeated Noosa 1 @ Glasshouse Mts Sportsground	Beegees – Shaun DeCourcy (2 including a penalty), Paul Korczynski Noosa – Bob Chalmers
5th	Kawana	21	9	1	11	32	37	28			
6th	Maroochydore	21	6	5	10	27	30	23			
7th	Nambour Reds	21	5	2	14	22	47	17			
8th	Woombye	21	4	3	14	24	53	15			

Ref:

=== 1990 – Beegees win 4th successive Premiership ===
Position	Club	Played	Won	Drew	Lost	For	Against	Points	1990 Finals	Results & Venues	Goalscorers
Premiers	Beegees	21	18	2	1	61	15	56	Minor semi-final (3rd v 4th)	Noosa 2 defeated Caloundra 0 @ Wises Road, Maroochydore	Noosa – Doug Parkin, Wolfgang Schneider
2nd	Buderim	21	14	3	4	64	21	45	Major semi-final (1st v 2nd)	Buderim 2 defeated Beegees 0 after extra time (0–0 at full-time) @ Sir Thomas Hiley Park, Tewantin	Buderim – Tony Bright, Shaun DeCourcy
3rd	Caloundra	21	12	4	5	44	21	40	Preliminary final	Beegees 4 defeated Noosa 0 @ Glasshouse Mts Sportsground	Beegees – Paul Forsdike, Wayne Edwards, Alan Curtis (penalty), Chris Hall
4th	Noosa	21	8	5	8	32	32	29	Grand final	Buderim 2 defeated Beegees 0 @ Ballinger Park, Buderim	Buderim – Tony Bright, David Currie
5th	Kawana	21	8	2	11	39	49	26			
6th	Maroochydore	21	6	4	11	31	41	22			
7th	Woombye	21	3	3	15	21	50	12			
8th	Nambour Reds	21	2	3	16	26	89	9			

=== 1991 – Beegees win 5th successive Premiership ===
Position	Club	Played	Won	Drew	Lost	For	Against	Points	1991 Finals	Results & Venues	Goalscorers
Premiers	Beegees	16	13	2	1	45	9	41	Minor semi-final (3rd v 4th)	Nambour Reds 1 defeated Kawana 0 @ Wises Road, Maroochydore	Nambour Reds – Nick Harris
2nd	Buderim	16	11	0	5	33	16	33	Major semi-final (1st v 2nd)	Beegees 2 defeated Buderim 1 @ Quad Park, Kawana	Beegees – David Payne, Shaun DeCourcy Buderim – Danny Lobwein (penalty)
3rd	Kawana	16	9	2	5	26	19	29	Preliminary final	Buderim 0 drew with Nambour Reds 0 after extra time (0–0 at full-time) @ Sir Thomas Hiley Park, Tewantin	
4th	Nambour Reds	16	8	1	7	21	23	25	Preliminary final Replay	Buderim 3 defeated Nambour Reds 0 @ Ballinger Park, Buderim	Buderim – Danny Lobwein, Scott Elliott, Ian Hutchison
5th	Caloundra	16	6	4	6	19	21	22	Grand final	Buderim 3 defeated Beegees 0 @ Glasshouse Mts Sportsground	Buderim – Ian Hutchison (2), Paul Lees
6th	Noosa	16	5	4	7	25	27	19			
7th	Maroochydore	16	5	3	8	18	16	18			
8th	Coolum	16	3	4	9	19	35	13			
9th	Woombye	16	2	0	14	6	46	6			

=== 1992 – Beegees win 6th successive Premiership & Premiership-Grand final double ===
Position	Club	Played	Won	Drew	Lost	For	Against	Points	1992 Finals	Results & Venues	Goalscorers
Premiers	Beegees	27	20	5	2	89	14	65	Minor semi-final (3rd v 4th)	Kawana 2 defeated Woombye 1 @ Glasshouse Mts Sportsground	Kawana – Steven Grazier, Les 'Casper' Fleming (penalty) Woombye – John Robertson
2nd	Buderim	27	19	4	4	74	28	61	Major semi-final (1st v 2nd)	Beegees 2 drew with Buderim 2 after extra time (2–2 at full-time) @ Ballinger Park, Buderim	Beegees – Shaun DeCourcy (2) Buderim – Jeff Haydon, Jason Dunn
3rd	Kawana	27	16	4	7	64	33	52	Major semi-final (Replay)	Beegees 2 defeated Buderim 0 @ Ballinger Park, Buderim	Beegees – David Payne, Simon Courtney
4th	Woombye	27	13	4	10	51	45	43	Preliminary final	Kawana 3 defeated Buderim 2 @ Quad Park, Kawana	Kawana – Les 'Casper' Fleming, Steven Morris, Roger Hardwicke Buderim – Jeff Haydon, Craig Hawkins
5th	Caloundra	27	12	3	12	39	30	39	Grand final	Beegees 3 defeated Kawana 1 @ Sir Thomas Hiley Park, Tewantin	Beegees – Shaun DeCourcy, David Payne, Carlos DeMaine Kawana – Les 'Casper' Fleming (penalty)
6th	Nambour Reds	27	11	3	13	51	49	36			
7th	Maroochydore	27	8	9	10	34	38	33			
8th	Noosa	27	7	10	10	48	56	31			
9th	Coolum	27	2	6	19	18	66	12			
10th	Maleny	27	1	4	22	14	123	7			

=== 1993 – Beegees win 7th consecutive Premiership & Premiership-Grand final doubles ===
Position	Club	Played	Won	Drew	Lost	For	Against	Points	1993 SCSA Cup	Results & Venues	Goalscorers
Premiers	Beegees	21	16	3	2	61	17	51	Quarter-final (1st v 8th)	Beegees 1 defeated Nambour Reds 0 @ Ballinger Park, Buderim	Beegees – Simon Courtney
2nd	Buderim	21	15	4	2	57	25	49	Quarter-final (2nd v 7th)	Caloundra 2 defeated Buderim 1 @ Yandina Sportsground	Caloundra – Chris Lucas, Grant Donaldson Buderim – Scott Elliott (penalty)
3rd	Kawana	21	11	3	7	41	26	36	Quarter-final (3rd v 6th)	Maroochydore 5 defeated Kawana 4 @ Sir Thomas Hiley Park, Tewantin	Maroochydore – Marty McMillan (2), Rodney Allen (2), Barry Way Kawana – Les 'Casper' Fleming (2), Darren Nott, Brad Gill
4th	Woombye	21	8	3	10	31	32	27	Quarter-final (4th v 5th)	Woombye 4 defeated Noosa 2 after extra time (2–2 at full-time) @ Wises Road, Maroochydore	Woombye – Jeff Greaves, Albert Gallou, Scott Rocker Noosa – Carl Harrison, Neil Hall
5th	Noosa	21	7	4	10	29	47	25	Semi-final	Beegees 3 defeated Woombye 1 after extra time (1–1 at full-time) @ Quad Park, Kawana	Beegees – David Payne, Shaun DeCourcy, Simon Courtney Woombye – Scott Murchie
6th	Maroochydore	21	8	0	13	31	41	24	Semi-final	Maroochydore 3 defeated Caloundra 0 @ Central Park, Caloundra	Maroochydore – David Marcon, Rodney Allen, Marty McMillan
7th	Caloundra	21	5	3	13	27	37	18	Final	Beegees 1 defeated Maroochydore 0 @ Glasshouse Mts Sportsground	Beegees – Simon Courtney
8th	Nambour Reds	21	3	2	16	22	74	11			

== 1994—Buderim win Premiership-Grand final double ==
Position	Club	Played	Won	Drew	Lost	For	Against	Points	1994 SCSA Cup	Results & Venues	Goalscorers
Premier	Buderim	24	18	2	4	85	21	56	Knock-out Final (8th v 9th)	Caloundra defeated Nambour Reds	Unknown
2nd	Woombye	24	14	2	8	53	36	44 (+17)	Quarter-final (1st v Winner of 8th v 9th)	Buderim 2 defeated Caloundra 0 @ Yandina Sportsground	Buderim – Craig Paulett (2)
3rd	Kawana	24	13	5	6	53	41	44 (+12)	Quarter-final (2nd v 7th)	Maroochydore 3 defeated Woombye 1 @ Woombye Sportsground	Maroochydore – David Marcon (2), Bruce Giles Woombye – Scott Rocker
4th	Beegees	24	11	4	9	42	29	37	Quarter-final (3rd v 6th)	Kawana 2 defeated Noosa 1 @ Sir Thomas Hiley Park, Tewantin	Kawana – David Milne, David Hill Noosa – Unknown
5th	Coolum	24	8	9	7	31	31	33	Quarter-final (4th v 5th)	Beegees 3 defeated Coolum 2 @ Sir Thomas Hiley Park, Tewantin	Beegees – Scott Fullerton, Peter Eeles, Jeff Haydon Coolum – Unknown
6th	Noosa	24	10	2	12	44	60	32	Semi-final	Buderim 3 defeated Beegees 0 @ Glasshouse Mts Sportsground	Buderim – Jason Dunn, Craig Paulett, Scott Elliott
7th	Maroochydore	24	7	6	11	35	47	27	Semi-final	Maroochydore 2 defeated Kawana 0 @ Central Park, Caloundra	Maroochydore – Bruce Giles, Mark Condon
8th	Caloundra	24	6	8	10	38	41	26	Final	Buderim 3 defeated Maroochydore 0 @ Ballinger Park, Buderim	Buderim – Mark Hill, Jason Dunn, Craig Paulett (penalty)
9th	Nambour Reds	24	1	2	21	25	100	0			

== 1995—Caloundra win grand final ==
=== Heritage Soccer League – Final Table ===
Position	Club	Played	Won	Drew	Lost	For	Against	Points	1995 Finals	Results & Venues	Goalscorers
Premiers	Noosa	21	11	6	4	42	21	39	Minor semi-final (3rd v 4th)	Coolum 4 defeated Woombye 1 @ Glasshouse Mts Sportsground	Coolum – Shane Clarke (4) Woombye – Scott Rocker
2nd	Caloundra	21	11	5	5	38	22	38	Major semi-final (1st v 2nd)	Caloundra 3 defeated Noosa 1 @ Glasshouse Mts Sportsground	Caloundra – Kevin Raynor, Greg Donald, Clint Isambert Noosa – Stuart Daw
3rd	Coolum	21	10	5	6	35	25	35	Preliminary final	Noosa 1 defeated Coolum 0 @ Glasshouse Mts Sportsground	Noosa – Carl Harrison
4th	Woombye	21	11	1	9	35	34	34	Grand final	Caloundra 2 defeated Noosa 1 after extra time (1–1 at full-time) @ Glasshouse Mts Sportsground	Caloundra – Greg Donald, Dennis Griffin Noosa – Steve Nash
5th	Kawana	21	8	7	6	29	28	31			
6th	Buderim	21	7	4	10	29	46	25			
7th	Beegees	21	4	4	13	28	40	16			
8th	Maroochydore	21	3	6	12	31	51	15			

ref:

== 1996 – Coolum wins the 1st & 2nd Division Premiership double, passing of Peter Cox Senior ==
Football in Coolum began informally in 1974 with Coolum Soccer Club being formally established in February 1975. In their first season Coolum fielded 3 junior teams; Under 8, Under 12 and Under 16 and played at Jack Morgan Park, Coolum. In 1976 Coolum fielded their first senior side in Reserve Grade. In 1982 Coolum were first promoted to A Grade whilst also fielding a Reserve Grade side. Premiership and grand final success at senior level were elusive i.e. non-existent ... until 1996.

In 1996 Coolum won their first premierships in both 1st and 2nd Division; only the 5th time in post-1968 competition that a club had won the 1st and 2nd Division premiership double (Noosa River – 1981, 1983; Buderim – 1985, 1994). The Alex Murphy coached 1st Division were also the 5th A Grade/1st Division team and the first since Beegees in 1977, to go through the season undefeated. Such was Coolum's dominance they clinched the 1st Division premiership in Round 16 with 2 rounds remaining. The Coolum 2nd Division side won the premiership in the final round defeating Buderim 2–1 at Ballinger Park after both teams entered the game equal on 38 points.

The lowlight of the 1996 season was the passing of Peter Cox Senior, a pioneering figure in Sunshine Coast and Gympie soccer. Cox was the inaugural president of the Woombye club, serving as president or vice-president from 1968 until 1974. Cox also served on the Sunshine Coast Soccer Association committee, as vice-president or secretary from 1974 until 1980. Cox was also instrumental in the formation of the Sunshine Coast Referee's Association and a qualified referee, refereeing many senior games. In the mid-1970s Cox moved from Woombye to Kandanga near Gympie where he became involved in Gympie, Wide Bay and Queensland junior soccer. Cox received 6 life memberships for his contribution to soccer:

- Woombye Soccer Club
- Sunshine Soccer Association
- Gympie Soccer Association
- Gympie Referee's Association
- Wide Bay Zone Soccer
- Queensland Junior Soccer Association

One other lowlight of the 1996 season was the failure of the 1995 champions Caloundra and premiers Noosa to make the finals. Caloundra's premiership-winning coach Dennis Morris departed mid-season, as did Kevin Raynor the eventual Sunshine Coast player of the year, who transferred to Maroochydore. Noosa were frustrated by too many draws, eventually finishing 6th.

Coolum crashed out of the 1996 1st Division championship after being beaten by Buderim in the major semi-final (2–1; Goalscorers – Buderim (Shaun Blackman, Andy Thomas), Coolum (Shane Clarke)) and by Beegees on penalties after it was 1–1 after extra time in the preliminary final (Goalscorers – Beegees (David Moore), Coolum (Pat Lynch)). Beegees won their 13th championship, beating Buderim 5–3 after extra time in the grand final (3–3 at full-time) after they were down 2–0 after 30 minutes. Jason Dunn scored twice during extra time to seal Beegees victory. Goalscorers for Beegees were Jeff Haydon, David Moore, Chris Fullerton (penalty) and Jason Dunn (2), and for Buderim Shaun Blackman (hat-trick).

Coolum made the 2nd Division grand final by beating Buderim 3–1 in the major semi-final but were thwarted by Buderim in the grand final losing on penalties after the game ended 1–1 after extra time. Coolum would redeem themselves by winning the 1997 2nd Division premiership and grand final double, their first and so far only 2nd Division championship.

=== 1996 – 1st Division – Heritage League – Final Table & Finals Results ===
Position	Club	Played	Won	Drew	Lost	For	Against	Points	1996 Finals	Results & Venues	Goalscorers
Premiers	Coolum (Undefeated)	18	15	3	–	73	19	48	Minor semi-final (3rd v 4th)	Beegees 2 defeated Woombye 1 @ Glasshouse Mts Sportsground	Beegees – Shaun DeCourcy (2) Woombye – Unknown
2nd	Buderim	18	13	1	4	56	23	40	Major semi-final (1st v 2nd)	Buderim 2 defeated Coolum 1 @ Glasshouse Mts Sportsground	Buderim – Shaun Blackman, Andy Thomas Coolum – Shane Clarke
3rd	Beegees	18	10	2	6	38	22	32	Preliminary final	Beegees 1 defeated Coolum 1 on penalties (4–3) after extra time (1–1 at full time) @ Glasshouse Mts Sportsground	Beegees – David Moore Coolum – Pat Lynch
4th	Woombye	18	9	5	4	38	27	32	Grand final	Beegees 5 defeated Buderim 3 after extra time (3–3 at full time) @ Glasshouse Mts Sportsground	Beegees – Jason Dunn (2), Jeff Haydon, David Moore, Chris Fullerton (penalty) Buderim – Shaun Blackman (hat-trick)
5th	Maroochydore	18	8	3	7	42	31	27			
6th	Noosa	18	6	8	4	39	25	26			
7th	Caloundra	18	5	4	9	33	48	19			
8th	Kawana	18	3	6	9	25	37	15			
9th	Nambour Reds	18	2	5	11	29	63	11			
10th	Caboolture	18	0	1	17	20	98	1			

== 1997 – Nambour Yandina United is born, Kawana win their first trophy ==
On Saturday 26 April 1997 a new club, Nambour Yandina United was born at Yandina Sportsground following the merger of 2 existing clubs; Nambour & District Soccer Club (or Nambour Reds) affiliated with the Sunshine Coast Soccer Federation and Yandina Eagles affiliated with the Sunshine Coast Churches Soccer Association. The day featured a unification photograph, fireworks, a cannon fire display and special guests Brisbane Strikers' players Wayne Knipe and Kasey Wehrman. The merger involved months of negotiations and an interim committee, with the club taking the temporary name Nambour Red Eagles. At their end of season presentation dinner in September Nambour Yandina United unveiled their new club logo designed by senior player Wayne Hartley and incorporating an Eagle and a football.

The creation of Nambour Yandina United by merging Nambour Reds (with seniors and juniors) and Yandina Eagles (with juniors only) created at that time the largest club in the Sunshine Coast Soccer Federation. Nambour Yandina United had 27 teams including 22 junior teams and 5 senior teams (4 senior men's teams and 1 senior women's team). In 1st Division Nambour Yandina United lost their first game with their new name to Beegees 3–1 and eventually finished a disappointing 9th in the 10-team competition.

In April the Sunshine Coast Soccer Federation reported a total of 2,163 players:

- Junior girls – 100
- Junior boys – 1,449
- Colts (Seniors) – 114
- Senior Women – 100
- Senior Men – 400
- Total – 2,163

Combined with Sunshine Coast Churches Soccer Association's 1,539 players a total of 3,702 players were playing football on the Sunshine Coast.

Noosa under coach Terry Wilcomes comfortably won their 5th premiership by 7 points from Coolum and looked to be on track to win the premiership-grand final double after beating Coolum in the major semi-final to go straight through to the grand final. Kawana snuck into 4th position after beating Beegees 3–0 in their Round 17 game at Glasshouse Mts Sportsground.

=== 1997 – 1st Division Final Table & Finals Results ===
Position	Club	Played	Won	Drew	Lost	For	Against	Points	1997 1st Division Finals	Results & Venues	Goalscorers
Premiers	Noosa	18	15	1	2	56	16	46	Minor semi-final (3rd v 4th)	Kawana 4 defeated Buderim 2 @ Quad Park, Kawana	Kawana – Scott Dixon (2), Neil Sharman, Roger Hardwicke (penalty) Buderim – Brendan Hayward (2)
2nd	Coolum	18	12	3	3	54	22	39	Major semi-final (1st v 2nd)	Noosa 3 defeated Coolum 2 (Golden goal in extra time) @ Quad Park, Kawana	Noosa – Matt Holland, Nick Hall, Morgan Cawley (Golden goal) Coolum – John Murphy (penalty), Jon Wrigley
3rd	Buderim	18	11	3	4	62	29	36	Preliminary final	Kawana 2 defeated Coolum 0 @ Sir Thomas Hiley Park, Tewantin	Kawana – Neil Sharman, Scott Dixon
4th	Kawana	18	11	2	5	38	25	35	Grand final	Kawana 3 defeated Noosa 2 (Golden goal in extra time) @ Glasshouse Mts Sportsground	Kawana – Wayne Mitchell, Les Fleming, Scott Dixon (Golden goal) Noosa – Carl Harrison, Lawrence Ewart
5th	Beegees	18	11	1	6	46	26	34			
6th	Maroochydore	18	10	2	6	34	34	32			
7th	Caboolture	18	3	4	11	23	60	13			
8th	Woombye	18	2	4	12	12	36	10			
9th	Nambour Yandina United	18	2	3	13	18	53	9			
10th	Caloundra	18	0	3	15	13	55	3			

== 1998 – Noosa win Premiership-Grand final double ==
=== Recognition for Fin McColm ===
In January 1998 Fin McColm, one of the founders of Caloundra was inducted into the Sunshine Coast Sports Hall of Fame for his contribution to soccer and refereeing on the Sunshine Coast. The full citation read:

Fin McColm

Soccer (January 1998)

He has been involved in sport and administration for the past 30 years and was awarded an Australia Day Award for his outstanding contribution. In 1968 Fin McColm, with a small group of helpers, established the Caloundra United Soccer Club. In 1972 Fin was also a foundation member of the Sunshine Coast Soccer Referees Association. He has been involved in sport and administration for the past 30 years and was awarded an Australia Day Award for his outstanding contribution.

=== 1998 – Heritage League Final Table & Finals ===
Position	Club	Played	Won	Drew	Lost	For	Against	Points	1998 Finals	Results	Goalscorers
Premiers	Noosa (Undefeated)	17	15	2	0	78	12	47	Minor semi-final (3rd v 4th)	Buderim 1 defeated Kawana 0 @ Glasshouse Mts Sportsground	Buderim – Marcus Lister
2nd	Maroochydore	17	14	1	2	44	20	43	Major semi-final (1st v 2nd)	Noosa 2 defeated Maroochydore 1 @ Glasshouse Mts Sportsground	Noosa – Unknown Maroochydore – Unknown
3rd	Kawana	17	10	3	4	45	21	33	Preliminary final	Maroochydore 2 defeated Buderim 0 @ Glasshouse Mts Sportsground	Maroochydore – Louis Harris, Craig Ferguson
4th	Buderim	17	8	3	6	40	30	27	Grand final	Noosa 3 defeated Maroochydore 0 @ Sir Thomas Hiley Park, Tewantin	Noosa – Peter Woods (2), Michael Williams
5th	Nambour Yandina United	17	5	8	4	29	29	23 (0)			
6th	Beegees	17	6	5	6	23	28	23 (−5)			
7th	Caboolture	18	4	4	10	24	45	16			
8th	Caloundra	17	4	3	10	16	38	15			
9th	Coolum	17	1	5	11	21	45	8			
10th	Woombye	18	1	2	15	12	64	5			

== 1999 – Maroochydore win their first Premiership in 24 years ==
Position	Club	Played	Won	Drew	Lost	For	Against	Points	1999 Finals	Results	Goalscorers
Premiers	Maroochydore	18	14	2	2	48	20	44	Minor semi-final (3rd v 4th)	Nambour Yandina United 2 defeated Noosa 1 @ Glasshouse Mts Sportsground	Nambour Yandina United – Ray Schouten, Cheyne Jobson Noosa – Ben Tett
2nd	Kawana	18	13	2	3	42	19	41	Major semi-final (1st v 2nd)	Kawana 3 defeated Maroochydore 2 @ Glasshouse Mts Sportsground	Kawana – Peter Watson, Shaun Claridge, Shane Petersen Maroochydore – Jason Miles, Rodney Allen
3rd	Noosa	18	11	4	3	55	14	37	Preliminary final	Maroochydore 2 defeated Nambour Yandina United 1 @ Glasshouse Mts Sportsground	Maroochydore – Rodney Allen (2) Nambour Yandina United – Shane Clarke
4th	Nambour Yandina United	18	10	3	5	45	20	33	Grand final	Kawana 2 defeated Maroochydore 0 @ Glasshouse Mts Sportsground	Kawana – Shaun Claridge (2)
5th	Buderim	18	9	3	6	34	25	30			
6th	Caboolture	17	6	4	7	36	31	22			
7th	Caloundra	18	4	3	11	15	46	15			
8th	Coolum	17	4	2	11	22	50	14			
9th	Beegees	18	3	4	11	19	46	13			
10th	Woombye	18	1	1	16	8	53	4			

Ref:

== 2000 – Noosa wins Premiership-Grand final double ==
Position	Club	Played	Won	Drew	Lost	For	Against	Points	2000 Finals	Results	Goalscorers
Premiers	Noosa	16	10	1	5	56	32	31 (+24)	Minor semi-final (3rd v 4th)	Gympie Miners 4 defeated Kawana 3 (Golden goal in extra time) (3–3 at full-time) @ Glasshouse Mts Sportsground	Gympie Miners – Jason Lord (2), Mick Preston, Nathan Kunst (Golden goal) Kawana – Shane Petersen, Craig Sharman, Own goal
2nd	Nambour Yandina United	16	10	1	5	44	23	31 (+21)	Major semi-final (1st v 2nd)	Noosa 1 defeated Nambour Yandina United 0 @ Glasshouse Mts Sportsground	Noosa – Ben Tett
3rd	Kawana	16	10	0	6	39	25	30	Preliminary final	Gympie Miners 2 defeated Nambour Yandina United 1 @ Glasshouse Mts Sportsground	Gympie Miners – David Arthur, Mick Preston Nambour Yandina United – Ray Schouten
4th	Gympie Miners	16	8	3	5	37	31	27	Grand final	Noosa 2 defeated Gympie Miners 1 (Golden goal in extra time) (1–1 at full-time) @ Glasshouse Mts Sportsground	Noosa – Michael Williams, Scott Rocker (Golden goal) Gympie Miners – Darren Cross
5th	Maroochydore	16	8	2	6	37	26	26			
6th	Buderim	16	7	2	7	28	24	23			
7th	Coolum	16	5	4	7	19	28	19			
8th	Caloundra	16	3	4	9	15	36	13			
9th	Woombye	16	1	3	12	15	65	6			

== 2001 to 2006 – Kawana wins 6 successive Premierships ==
=== 2001 – 1st Division Final Table ===
Position	Club	Played	Won	Drew	Lost	For	Against	Points	2001 1st Division Finals	Results & Venues	Goalscorers
Premiers	Kawana (Undefeated)	18	16	2	0	70	14	50	Minor semi-final (3rd v 4th)	Nambour Yandina United 2 defeated Buderim 1 @ Quad Park, Kawana	Nambour Yandina United – Steve Forsyth (2) Buderim – Stuart Collins
2nd	Noosa	18	12	3	3	49	27	39	Major semi-final (1st v 2nd)	Noosa 2 defeated Kawana 0 @ Quad Park, Kawana	Noosa – Michael Williams (2)
3rd	Buderim	18	10	3	5	51	28	33	Preliminary final	Kawana 4 defeated Nambour Yandina United 2 @ Glasshouse Mts Sportsground	Kawana – Nathan Kunst, Ian Murphy, Shaun Claridge (2) Nambour Yandina United – Cheyne Jobson, Joachim Hell
4th	Nambour Yandina United	18	8	4	6	45	31	28	Grand final	Noosa defeated Kawana 5–4 on penalties (2–2 after extra time, 2–2 at full-time) @ Quad Park, Kawana	Noosa – Michael Williams, Wes Fleiter Kawana – Jai Cross, Nathan Kunst
5th	Maroochydore	18	7	6	5	31	19	27			
6th	Coolum	18	7	5	6	41	33	26			
7th	Gympie Miners	18	7	1	10	40	46	22			
8th	Woombye	18	6	4	8	29	42	22			
9th	Beegees	18	2	0	16	14	73	6			
10th	Caboolture	18	0	2	16	15	72	2			

Ref:

=== 2002 – 1st Division Final Table ===
Position	Club	Played	Won	Drew	Lost	For	Against	Points	2002 1st Division Finals	Results & Venues	Goalscorers
Premiers	Kawana (Undefeated)	20	19	1	0	75	15	58	Minor semi-final (3rd v 4th)	Maroochydore 2 defeated Buderim 0 @ Glasshouse Mts Sportsground	Maroochydore – Rodney Allen, Johan Svensson
2nd	Gympie Miners	20	12	2	6	63	42	38 (+21)	Major semi-final (1st v 2nd)	Kawana 4 defeated Gympie Miners 2 @ Martins Creek Regional Football Complex, Maroochydore	Kawana – Shane Peterson (2), Scott Rocker, Jai Cross Gympie Miners – Dave Arthur (2)
3rd	Buderim	20	11	5	4	58	40	38 (+18)	Preliminary final	Maroochydore 3 defeated Gympie Miners 0 @ Quad Park, Kawana	Maroochydore – Scott McKeown (3)
4th	Maroochydore	20	9	5	6	49	29	32	Grand final	Maroochydore 2 defeated Kawana 1 @ Glasshouse Mts Sportsground	Maroochydore – Johan Svensson, Adam Jeffs Kawana – Scott Rocker
5th	Caloundra-Shelly Park United	20	7	8	5	45	41	29			
6th	Noosa	20	7	6	7	42	36	27			
7th	Beegees	20	8	3	9	41	41	27			
8th	Nambour Yandina United	20	8	2	10	41	41	26			
9th	Caboolture	20	4	2	14	25	72	14			
10th	Woombye	20	3	2	15	22	58	11			
11th	Coolum	20	2	4	14	22	63	10			

Ref:

=== 2003 – 1st Division Final Table ===
Position	Club	Played	Won	Drew	Lost	For	Against	Points	2003 Finals	Results & Venues	Goalscorers
Premiers	Kawana	20	17	0	3	74	21	51	Minor semi-final (3rd v 4th)	Gympie Miners 2 defeated Noosa 1	
2nd	Caloundra-Shelly Park United	20	14	3	3	87	29	45	Major semi-final (1st v 2nd)	Kawana defeated Caloundra-Shelly Park United on penalties (2–2 after extra time, 2–2 at full-time)	
3rd	Gympie Miners	20	14	1	5	71	36	43 (+35)	Preliminary final	Caloundra-Shelly Park United 5 defeated Gympie Miners 2	
4th	Noosa	20	13	4	3	51	35	43 (+16)	Grand final	Kawana 3 defeated Caloundra-Shelly Park United 0 @ Glasshouse Mts Sportsground	Kawana – Scott Rocker 3 (including a penalty)
5th	Maroochydore	20	13	0	7	67	39	39			
6th	Buderim	20	9	3	8	42	33	30			
7th	Nambour Yandina United	20	6	2	12	29	52	20			
8th	Coolum	20	5	2	13	31	61	17			
9th	Caboolture	20	4	0	16	36	88	12			
10th	Woombye	20	2	4	14	24	65	10			
11th	Beegees	20	2	3	15	19	72	9			

Ref:

=== 2004 – 1st Division Final Table ===
Position	Club	Played	Won	Drew	Lost	For	Against	Points	2004 1st Division Finals	Results & Venues	Goalscorers
Premiers	Kawana	20	16	1	3	62	18	49	Minor semi-final (3rd v 4th)	Coolum 4 defeated Gympie Miners 0 @ Martins Creek Regional Football Complex, Maroochydore	Coolum – Ralph McDonald, Trevor Morrison (3)
2nd	Caloundra-Shelly Park United	20	14	1	5	55	33	43	Major semi-final (3rd v 4th)	Caloundra-Shelly Park United 5 defeated Kawana 3 @ Quad Park, Kawana	Caloundra-Shelly Park United – Farren Fleiter, Ben Knight (2), Tim Newton Kawana – Scott Rocker (3)
3rd	Gympie Miners	20	12	4	4	60	32	40	Preliminary final	Coolum 3 defeated Kawana 0 @ Glasshouse Mts Sportsground	Coolum – Jai Cross, Nathan Kunst, Trevor Morrison
4th	Coolum	20	12	1	7	69	21	37 (+48)	Grand final	Coolum 3 defeated Caloundra-Shelly Park United 0 @ Glasshouse Mts Sportsground	Coolum – Jai Cross, Trevor Morrison, Tim Standley
5th	Maroochydore	20	12	1	7	59	27	37 (+32)			
6th	Buderim	20	11	0	9	55	39	33			
7th	Nambour Yandina United	20	9	3	8	29	38	30			
8th	Noosa	20	7	2	11	40	46	23			
9th	Beegees	20	2	4	14	24	65	10 (−41)			
10th	North Shore	20	3	1	16	27	116	10 (−89)			
11th	Woombye	20	2	2	16	15	60	8			

Ref:

=== 2005 – 1st Division Final Table ===
Position	Club	Played	Won	Drew	Lost	For	Against	Points	2005 1st Division Finals	Results & Venues	Goalscorers
Premiers	Kawana	20	16	2	2	72	20	50	Minor semi-final (3rd v 4th)	Maroochydore 3 defeated Caloundra-Shelly Park United 2 after extra time (1–1 at full-time) @ Glasshouse Mts Sportsground	Maroochydore – Louis Harris, Damien Allen, Michael Scarff Caloundra-Shelly Park United – Jon Daniels, Ben Knight (penalty)
2nd	Coolum	20	15	2	3	72	20	47	Major semi-final (1st v 2nd)	Coolum 1 defeated Kawana 0 after extra time (0–0 at full-time) @ John Allden Park, Coolum	Coolum – Trevor Morrison
3rd	Caloundra-Shelly Park United	20	13	2	5	61	20	41 (+41)	Preliminary final	Kawana 2 defeated Maroochydore 1 @ Quad Park, Kawana	Kawana – John Stocker, Kurt Bragg Maroochydore – Damien Allen
4th	Maroochydore	20	13	2	5	55	21	41 (+34)	Grand final	Kawana 3 defeated Coolum 1 after extra time (1–1 at full-time) @ Martins Creek Regional Football Complex, Maroochydore	Kawana – Adam Cross, Scott Rocker (2) Coolum – Trevor Morrison
5th	Gympie Miners	20	12	1	7	47	32	37			
6th	Buderim	20	11	2	7	37	40	35			
7th	Nambour Yandina United	20	6	3	11	32	32	21			
8th	Woombye	20	6	2	12	29	67	20			
9th	Noosa	20	5	0	15	22	62	15			
10th	Beegees	20	4	2	14	20	73	14			
11th	Caboolture	20	0	0	20	0	60	0			

ref:

=== 2006 – 1st Division Final Table ===
Position	Club	Played	Won	Drew	Lost	For	Against	Points	2006 1st Division Finals	Results & Venues	Goalscorers
Premiers	Kawana	18	16	1	1	79	12	49	Minor semi-final (3rd v 4th)	Maroochydore 2 defeated Noosa 1 after extra time (1–1 at full-time) @ Glasshouse Mts Sportsground	Maroochydore – Paul Baretta, Unknown Noosa – Unknown
2nd	Caloundra-Shelly Park United	18	15	2	1	58	13	47	Major semi-final (1st v 2nd)	Kawana 3 defeated Caloundra-Shelly Park United 0 @ Martins Creek Regional Football Complex, Maroochydore	Kawana – Luke Ricketts (2), Matt Rocker
3rd	Maroochydore	18	12	4	2	47	21	40	Preliminary final	Maroochydore 6 defeated Caloundra-Shelly Park United 1 @ Glasshouse Mts Sportsground	Maroochydore – Damien Allen (4), Adam Jeffs, Adam Pratt Caloundra-Shelly Park United – Sam Bennett
4th	Noosa	18	9	2	7	19	37	29	Grand final	Kawana defeated Maroochydore 5–4 on penalties (4–4 after extra time, 3–3 at full-time) @ Martins Creek Regional Football Complex, Maroochydore	Kawana – Luke Ricketts, Jarrad Ryan, Tyson Holmes, Scott Rocker Maroochydore – Damien Kuzba, Michael Scarff (penalty), Adam Jeffs, Doug Lewis
5th	Buderim	18	8	3	7	32	32	27			
6th	Coolum	18	8	2	8	46	36	26			
7th	Woombye	18	4	1	13	24	47	13			
8th	Nambour Yandina United	18	3	4	11	23	51	13			
9th	Gympie Miners	18	2	3	13	27	56	9			
10th	Beegees	18	1	2	15	12	62	5			

Ref:

== 2007 & 2008 – Buderim wins Premiership-Grand final double ==
=== 2007 – 1st Division Final Table ===
Position	Club	Played	Won	Drew	Lost	For	Against	Points	2007 1st Division Finals	Results & Venues	Goalscorers
Premiers	Buderim (Undefeated)	18	13	5	0	73	17	44	Minor semi-final (3rd v 4th)	Woombye 2 defeated Kawana 1 @ Glasshouse Mts Sportsground	Woombye – Joel Sadler (2) Kawana – John Murphy (penalty)
2nd	Maroochydore	18	12	6	0	59	17	42	Major semi-final (1st v 2nd)	Maroochydore 4 defeated Buderim 3 @ Martins Creek Regional Football Complex, Maroochydore	Maroochydore – Adam Jeffs (2), Michael Scarff, Damien Allen Buderim – Scott Rocker (2), Jai Cross
3rd	Woombye	18	10	4	4	38	26	34	Preliminary final	Buderim 2 defeated Woombye 0 @ Glasshouse Mts Sportsground	Buderim – Scott Rocker, Ben Robson
4th	Kawana	18	9	2	7	48	35	29	Grand final	Buderim 4 defeated Maroochydore 3 @ Martins Creek Regional Football Complex, Maroochydore	Buderim – Scott Rocker (3), Jai Cross Maroochydore – Michael Scarff, Adam Jeffs, Simon Mitchell
5th	Caloundra-Shelly Park United	18	9	1	8	47	43	28			
6th	Noosa	18	5	5	8	26	37	20 (−11)			
7th	Coolum	18	6	2	10	28	40	20 (−12)			
8th	Gympie Miners	18	6	1	11	33	53	19			
9th	Beegees	18	3	2	13	18	52	11			
10th	Nambour Yandina United	18	2	2	14	14	64	8			

Ref:

=== 2008 – 1st Division Final Table ===
Position	Club	Played	Won	Drew	Lost	For	Against	Points	2008 1st Division Finals	Result & Venue	Goalscorers
Premiers	Buderim	24	18	4	2	68	24	58	Minor semi-final	Nambour Yandina United 1 defeated Coolum 0 @ Martins Creek Regional Football Complex, Maroochydore	Nambour Yandina United – Sam Knight
2nd	Maroochydore	24	14	4	6	46	29	46	Major semi-final	Buderim 2 defeated Maroochydore 0 @ Glasshouse Mts Sportsground	Buderim – Shaun Callanan, Scott Rocker
3rd	Nambour Yandina United	24	10	7	7	48	38	37 (+10)	Preliminary final	Maroochydore 1 defeated Nambour Yandina United 0 @ Glasshouse Mts Sportsground	Maroochydore – Luke Bennett
4th	Coolum	24	11	4	9	32	43	37 (−9)	Grand final	Buderim 1 defeated Maroochydore 0 after extra time (0–0 at full-time) @ Martins Creek Regional Football Complex, Maroochydore	Buderim – Scott Rocker
5th	Woombye	24	10	2	12	47	53	32			
6th	Kawana	24	8	4	12	43	40	28			
7th	Beegees	24	8	3	13	44	47	27 (−3)			
8th	Noosa	24	7	6	11	42	51	27 (−9)			
9th	Gympie Miners	24	4	2	18	26	65	14			

== 2009 – Maroochydore wins Premiership-Grand final double ==
In 2009 after the heartbreak of twice coming 2nd in the premiership and losing 3 grand finals in succession Maroochydore broke through to win the premiership-grand final double. In the premiership Maroochydore lost just once, their final game of the season at home to Woombye who snuck past Nambour Yandina United to finish in 2nd place. In the grand final Maroochydore defeated Woombye 2–1 with Michael Scarff scoring both goals for Maroochydore and Nick Arden scoring an unlucky own goal for Woombye. Michael Scarff was the Russ Offner Medal winner for the player of the match.

=== 2009 – 1st Division Final Table ===
Position	Club	Played	Won	Drew	Lost	For	Against	Points	2009 1st Division Finals	Results & Venues	Goalscorers
Premiers	Maroochydore	20	14	5	1	65	19	47	Minor semi-final (3rd v 4th)	Nambour Yandina United 6 defeated Buderim 1 @ Martins Creek Regional Football Complex, (Maroochydore FC)	Nambour Yandina United – Sam Bennett (4), Kevin Harris (penalty), Firas Zein Buderim – Adam Cross
2nd	Woombye	20	13	1	6	55	33	40	Major semi-final (1st v 2nd)	Maroochydore 4 defeated Woombye 3 after extra time @ Grant Road, Morayfield (Caboolture)	Maroochydore – Luke Bennett (2), James Vonhoff, Ben Robson Woombye – Corey Towle (2), Leon Tyrell
3rd	Nambour Yandina United	20	11	4	5	46	27	37	Preliminary final	Woombye 2 defeated Nambour Yandina United 1 @ Glasshouse Mts Sportsground	Woombye – Corey Towle (penalty), Leon Tyrell (penalty) Nambour Yandina United – Sam Bennett (penalty)
4th	Buderim	20	11	3	6	50	25	36	Grand final	Maroochydore 2 defeated Woombye 1 @ Martins Creek Regional Football Complex, (Maroochydore FC)	Maroochydore – Michael Scarff (2) Woombye – Own goal
5th	Beegees	20	10	4	6	32	34	34			
6th	Kawana	20	10	2	8	50	42	32			
7th	Noosa	20	8	4	8	29	31	28			
8th	Coolum	20	6	5	9	31	34	23			
9th	Caboolture	20	6	4	10	34	49	22			
10th	Gympie	20	2	2	16	21	51	8			
11th	Caloundra-Shelly Park United	20	1	2	17	16	84	5			

== 2010 – Woombye wins their first grand final since 1984 ==
In 2010 after a 26-year wait Woombye won the grand final 3–1 after extra time (1–1 at full-time) against premiers Buderim at Martins Creek, Kuluin (the home of Maroochydore Football Club).

The 2010 season began with the re-branding of the 1st Division as the McDonald's Premier League after Sunshine Coast Football secured a 3-year $300,000 sponsorship from McDonald's.

In their debut season in Premier League, Cooroora (co-coached by Horst and Scott Rocker) came a creditable 6th just 2 points outside the top 4. In their first game in Premier League they defeated Caloundra-Shelly Park United (who failed to win a game during the season). There was some good news for Caloundra-Shelly Park United during 2010 as they moved from Central Park to their new 6-field home ground at the Meridan Sports Grounds.

Buderim won their sixth premiership under their new coach George Cowie, but in the grand final couldn't overcome a resilient Woombye, who fought back to win in extra time despite conceding a 70th-minute goal.

=== 2010 – McDonald's Premier League – Final Table & Finals ===
Position	Club	Played	Won	Drew	Lost	For	Against	Points	2010 Finals	Results & Venues	Goalscorers
Premiers	Buderim	20	15	3	2	48	17	48	Minor semi-final (3rd v 4th)	Noosa 1 defeated Nambour Yandina United 0 @ Grant Road, Morayfield (Caboolture)	Noosa – Nicol Watson
2nd	Woombye	20	12	5	3	59	26	41	Major semi-final (1st v 2nd)	Buderim 2 defeated Woombye 1 @ Martins Creek Regional Football Complex, Maroochydore	Buderim – Damien Waugh, Johan Isakkson Woombye – James Bradford
3rd	Nambour Yandina United	20	11	6	3	44	26	39	Preliminary final	Woombye 4 defeated Noosa 0 @ Martins Creek Regional Football Complex, Maroochydore	Woombye – Leon Tyrell, Craig Hawkins, Darren Bradley, Josh Walton
4th	Noosa	20	12	2	6	35	24	38	Grand final	Woombye 3 defeated Buderim 1 after extra time (1–1 at full-time) @ Martins Creek Regional Football Complex, Maroochydore	Woombye – Ken Criss, Josh Walton, Luke Alderson Buderim – Angelo Cootes
5th	Maroochydore	20	11	4	5	51	30	37			
6th	Cooroora	20	11	3	6	51	35	36			
7th	Kawana	20	8	4	8	38	36	27			
8th	Caboolture	20	5	2	13	28	56	17			
9th	Coolum	20	3	4	13	20	47	13			
10th	Beegees	20	2	3	15	19	57	9			
11th	Caloundra-Shelly Park United	20	0	4	16	21	60	4			

Ref:

== 2011 – Maroochydore wins 4th Premiership, Woombye wins 2nd successive grand final ==
Position	Club	Played	Won	Drew	Lost	For	Against	Points	2011 Premier League Finals	Results & Venues	Goalscorers
Premiers	Maroochydore	20	17	1	2	56	9	52	Minor semi-final (3rd v 4th)	Noosa 2 defeated Kawana 0 @ John Allden Park, Coolum	Noosa – Joel Bond, Kevin Evans
2nd	Woombye	20	13	3	4	76	30	42	Major semi-final (1st v 2nd)	Woombye 2 defeated Maroochydore 1 after extra time (1–1 at full-time) @ John Allden Park, Coolum	Woombye – Garth Tehilwec, Luke Alderson Maroochydore – Ben Robson
3rd	Kawana	20	13	2	5	57	24	41	Preliminary final	Maroochydore defeated Noosa 4–3 on penalties after extra time (1–1 after extra time, 1–1 at full-time) @ Meridan Plains, Caloundra	Maroochydore – James Vonhoff Noosa – Nicol Watson
4th	Noosa	20	12	3	5	51	23	39	Grand final	Woombye 2 defeated Maroochydore 1 @ Martins Creek Regional Football Complex, Maroochydore	Woombye – Luke Alderson (penalty), Corey Towle Maroochydore – Karl Vonhoff
5th	Nambour Yandina United	20	10	5	5	48	33	35			
6th	Buderim	20	10	1	9	46	30	31			
7th	Cooroora United	20	8	0	12	37	44	24			
8th	Caloundra	20	7	3	10	31	44	24			
9th	Coolum	20	4	2	14	18	46	14 (−28)			
10th	Caboolture	20	4	2	14	34	71	14 (−37)			
11th	Beegees	20	0	2	18	9	109	2			

Ref:

== 2012 – Kawana wins Premiership, Maroochydore wins grand final ==
Position	Club	Played	Won	Drew	Lost	For	Against	Points	McDonald's Premier League Finals	Results & Venues	Goalscorers
Premiers	Kawana	27	18	4	5	86	42	58	Elimination final (4th v 5th)	Woombye 5 defeated Buderim 2 @ Ballinger Park, Buderim	Woombye – Josh Walton (2), Luke Alderson, Jonathon Ladic, Corey Towle Buderim – Jeremy Stewart (2)
2nd	Maroochydore	27	16	6	5	63	33	54	Qualifying Final (2nd v 3rd)	Maroochydore 2 defeated Noosa 0 @ Martins Creek Regional Football Complex (Maroochydore)	Maroochydore – Nathan Starr, Matt Enticknap
3rd	Noosa	27	17	2	8	79	39	53 (+40)	Minor semi-final	Noosa defeated Woombye 3–1 on penalties (1–1 at full-time, 2–2 after extra time) @ Grant Road, Morayfield (Caboolture)	Noosa – Kevin Evans (penalty), Matt Thompson Woombye – Luke Alderson, Corey Towle
4th	Buderim	27	17	2	8	76	38	53 (+38)	Major semi-final	Maroochydore defeated Kawana 5–3 on penalties (1–1 at full-time, 1–1 after extra time) @ Martins Creek Regional Football Complex (Maroochydore)	Maroochydore – Michael Scarff (penalty) Kawana – Luke Ricketts
5th	Woombye	27	15	3	9	59	61	48	Preliminary final	Kawana 2 defeated Noosa 1 @ Meridan Plains, Caloundra	Kawana – Luke Ricketts, Dave Styles Noosa – Kevin Evans
6th	Nambour Yandina United	27	12	4	11	59	61	40	Grand final	Maroochydore 3 defeated Kawana 2 @ Martins Creek Regional Football Complex (Maroochydore)	Maroochydore – James Vonhoff (2), Karl Vonhoff Kawana – Ryan Delahunty (2)
7th	Coolum	27	11	3	13	75	69	36			
8th	Caloundra	27	6	5	16	49	65	23			
9th	Caboolture	27	5	5	17	53	86	20			
10th	Beegees	27	1	0	26	13	129	3			

== 2013—Hall of Fame Immortals, Maroochydore win Premiership-Grand final double ==
=== Hall of Fame – Induction of Inaugural Immortals ===
During 2013 Sunshine Coast Football unveiled its Hall of Fame to recognise those who had contributed to football on the Sunshine Coast and to preserve the game's local history. In 2013 3 players were recognised as inaugural immortals:

Player	Clubs
Jim Nipperess	Caloundra, Maroochydore
Lyle Bryce	Beegees
Nick Meredith	Buderim

=== Maroochydore win Premiership-Grand final double ===
After winning the premiership in the McDonald's Premier League, Maroochydore won the double beating Woombye 4–1 in the grand final.

Maroochydore claimed a grand final "four-peat" by winning:

- Women's Premier League 3–0 against Coolum
- Premier Reserves 2–0 against Buderim
- Third Division 1–0 against Coolum

Grand final teams

Player number	Maroochydore	Player number	Woombye
1	Tim Cornthwaite	1	Billy Alderson
4	Lee Hume	3	Mark Polley
5	Anthony Scarff	4	Tom Birrell
6	Scott Lewis (Captain)	5	Scott Williams
7	Karl Vonhoff	7	Josh Walton
8	Nick Arden	8	Allan Mikola-Dori
9	Matthew Enticknap	9	Luke Alderson
10	Nicholas Scarff	13	Greg Turnbull
11	Jordan Corte	15	Matthew Phipps
12	Michael Scarff	16	Nick Close
15	Taylor Walkinshaw	20	Craig Hawkins
Substitutes	Maroochydore	Substitutes	Woombye
2	Chris Toovey	6	Ben Schott
3	Brad Wallace	10	Caleb Richardson
13	Ben Lynch	11	Craig Morrison
14	Ryan Seaton	12	Jacob Ingram
Reserve Goalkeeper	Daniel White		
Coach	Garrad Zammit	Coach	Gary Newcome

=== 2013 McDonald's Premier League – Final Table & Finals ===
Position	Club	Played	Won	Drew	Lost	For	Against	Points	2013 Finals	Results & Venues	Goalscorers
Premiers	Maroochydore	18	12	3	3	59	30	39	Elimination final (4th v 5th)	Caboolture 3 defeated Caloundra 2 @ Meridan Plains, Caloundra	Caboolture – Ben Hayward, Jose Garcia, Alexander Steven Caloundra – Andrew Carter, Kaine Frew
2nd	Buderim	18	11	3	4	48	27	36	Qualifying Final (2nd v 3rd)	Woombye 6 defeated Buderim 3 @ Ballinger Park, Buderim	Woombye – Craig Hawkins (hat-trick), Luke Alderson (2), Allan Mikola-Dori Buderim – Shaun Callanan, Robert Jardin, Jeremy Stewart
3rd	Woombye	18	11	2	5	61	35	35	Minor semi-final (Winner of Elimination final v Loser of Qualifying Final)	Buderim 4 defeated Caboolture 0 @ Grant Road, Morayfield (Caboolture)	Buderim – Jordan Burgess (hat-trick), Glenn Standen
4th	Caloundra	18	10	3	5	48	26	33	Major semi-final (1st v Winner of Qualifying Final)	Maroochydore 1 defeated Woombye 0 @ Glasshouse Mts Sportsground	Maroochydore – Own goal
5th	Caboolture	18	9	5	4	50	30	32	Preliminary final	Woombye 2 defeated Buderim 1 @ Meridan Plains, Caloundra	Woombye – Luke Alderson, Scott Williams Buderim – Jeremy Stewart
6th	Kawana	18	9	3	6	71	38	30	Grand final	Maroochydore 4 defeated Woombye 1 @ Martins Creek Regional Football Complex, Maroochydore	Maroochydore – Jordan Corte, Michael Scarff, Nicholas Scarff, Chris Toovey Woombye – Ben Schott
7th	Noosa	18	6	5	7	39	34	23			
8th	Nambour Yandina United	18	6	3	9	40	48	21			
9th	Coolum	18	2	1	15	28	55	7			
10th	Beegees	18	0	0	18	6	127	0			

Ref:

== 2014—Inaugural Club Legends, Kawana win Premiership, Woombye win grand final ==
=== Hall of Fame – Inaugural Club Legends ===
The 2014 grand final was played at Martin's Creek Regional Football Complex at Kuluin. Prior to the senior men's McDonald's Premier League grand final between Woombye & Kawana the inaugural Sunshine Coast Football Club Legends were inducted into the Hall of Fame to honour their playing contribution to football on the Sunshine Coast during the first 10 years of the revived competition from 1968 to 1977:

Club	Hall of Fame Inductees
Beegees	Ken Fullerton, Alan Smerdon, Phil Shaw, Alan McMaster
Buderim	Ken Green, Terry Roe, Ken McLean, Darryl Cook
Caloundra	Lex Hubner, Les Kunde, Kim Cox, Gordon Cooper
Coolum	Colin Campbell, Vic Stork, Pat Lynch, Mick Bruce
Kawana	Les 'Casper' Fleming, Peter Watson, Jarred Ryan
Maroochydore	Graham Stevenson, Trevor Jones, Chris Dunk, John Lesslie
Nambour Yandina United	Bill Saunders, Dick Watson, Brian DeCourcy, Dave Maybury
Noosa	Tony Dobinson, Alan Dobinson, Steve Dobinson, Mike Hunt
Woombye	Wilf Pitcher, Horst Rocker, Alan Parkinson, Peter Cox Junior

=== 2014 McDonald's Premier League – Final Table & Finals ===
Position	Club	Played	Won	Drew	Lost	For	Against	Points	2014 Finals	Results & Venues	Goalscorers
Premiers	Kawana	18	11	5	2	64	28	38	Elimination final (4th v 5th)	Caloundra 5 defeated Noosa 4 after extra time (4–4 at full-time) @ Girraween Sports Complex, Noosa Heads	Caloundra – Ray Schultz (2), Mackenzie Smith, Joshua Forshey, Kaine Frew Noosa – Alex Barlow, Chris Jancevski, Dan Upton
2nd	Woombye	18	11	2	5	60	24	35 (+36)	Qualifying Final (2nd v 3rd)	Woombye 3 defeated Maroochydore 2 @ Woombye Sportsground	Woombye – Luke Alderson (hat-trick) Maroochydore – Jordan Corte, Taylor Walkinshaw
3rd	Maroochydore	18	10	5	3	57	32	35 (+25)	Minor semi-final (Winner of Elimination final v Loser of Qualifying Final)	Maroochydore 2 defeated Caloundra 1 @ Grant Road, Morayfield (Caboolture)	Unknown
4th	Noosa	18	9	6	3	58	30	33	Major semi-final (1st v Winner of Qualifying Final)	Kawana 4 defeated Woombye 2 @ Martins Creek Regional Football Complex, Maroochydore	Kawana – Jeremy Stewart, Unknown Woombye – Luke Alderson, Joel Couacaud
5th	Caloundra	18	9	4	5	54	28	31	Preliminary final	Woombye 2 defeated Maroochydore 0 @ Meridan Plains, Caloundra	Woombye – Luke Alderson, Jonathon Ladic
6th	Caboolture	18	9	1	8	49	44	28	Grand final	Woombye 5 defeated Kawana 2 @ Martins Creek Regional Football Complex, Maroochydore	Woombye – Luke Alderson (hat-trick), Josh Walton, Caleb Richardson Kawana –
7th	Buderim	18	7	4	7	53	38	25			
8th	Coolum	18	4	2	12	32	49	14			
9th	Nambour Yandina United	18	2	4	12	21	78	10			
10th	Beegees	18	1	1	16	18	115	4			

Ref:

== 2015—Woombye win Premiership, Kawana win grand final ==
Position	Club	Played	Won	Drew	Lost	For	Against	Points	2015 Finals	Results & Venues	Goalscorers
Premiers	Woombye	20	16	2	2	76	23	50	Minor semi-final (3rd v 4th)	Noosa 5 defeated Maroochydore 4 @ Grant Road, Morayfield (Caboolture)	To be confirmed
2nd	Kawana	20	14	3	3	93	27	45 (+66)	Major semi-final (1st v 2nd)	Kawana 3 defeated Woombye 1 @ Martins Creek Regional Football Complex, Maroochydore	To be confirmed
3rd	Noosa	20	14	3	3	57	24	45 (+33)	Preliminary final	Woombye 2 defeated Noosa 1 @ Meridan Plains, Caloundra	Woombye – Luke Alderson (2) Noosa –
4th	Maroochydore	20	13	1	6	81	35	40 (+46)	Grand final	Kawana 5 defeated Woombye 3 @ Sunshine Coast Stadium, Kawana	Kawana – Jeremy Stewart (hat-trick), Unknown Woombye – Joel Couacaud (2), Mark Polley
5th	Buderim	20	12	4	4	59	36	40 (+23)			
6th	Caboolture	20	12	1	7	80	34	37			
7th	Caloundra	20	8	2	10	44	44	26			
8th	Coolum	20	4	2	14	28	65	14			
9th	Gympie	20	4	1	15	22	77	13			
10th	Nambour Yandina United	20	2	0	18	14	110	6			
11th	Beegees	20	1	1	18	20	99	4			

Ref:

== 2016—Maroochydore win Premiership, Kawana win 2nd grand final in succession ==
Position	Club	Played	Won	Drew	Lost	For	Against	Points	2016 Finals	Results & Venues	Goalscorers
Premiers	Maroochydore	18	12	3	3	65	24	39	Minor semi-final (3rd v 4th)	Woombye 4 defeated Buderim 3 @ Meridan Plains, Caloundra	Woombye – Luke Alderson (2), Scott Dixson (penalty), Jonathon Ladic Buderim – To be advised
2nd	Kawana	18	11	0	7	62	34	33	Major semi-final (1st v 2nd)	Kawana 3 defeated Maroochydore 1 @ Martins Creek Regional Football Complex, Maroochydore	
3rd	Buderim	18	8	7	3	47	23	31 (+24)	Preliminary final	Woombye 3 defeated Maroochydore 1 @ Meridan Plains, Caloundra	Woombye – Scott Dixson (penalty), Luke Alderson, Josh Walton Maroochydore –
4th	Woombye	18	10	1	7	50	40	31 (+10)	Grand final	Kawana 4 defeated Woombye 2 @ Martins Creek Regional Football Complex, Maroochydore	Kawana – Ryan Delahunty (2), Liam Tucker, Luke Ricketts Woombye – Nick Close, Craig Hawkins
5th	Nambour Yandina United	18	9	1	8	30	35	28			
6th	Caloundra	18	7	4	7	34	36	25			
7th	Noosa	18	7	3	8	34	40	24			
8th	Coolum	18	6	3	9	28	49	21			
9th	Gympie Diggers	18	6	2	10	30	38	20			
10th	Beegees	18	1	2	15	18	79	5			

ref:

== 2017 – Noosa wins their first Premiership since 2000, Maroochydore wins grand final from 4th ==
In 2017 Noosa won their first top grade premiership since 2000. Noosa also won a trifecta of premierships in Men's football:

- Premier League
- Premier Reserves
- 3rd Division

Maroochydore won the grand final 2–0 from 4th position on the premiership table against premiers and red hot favourites Noosa. In doing so Maroochydore became the first club since Coolum in 2004 to win the grand final from the lowest finals position. Since 1968 this feat has only been achieved 4 times:

- 1997 – Kawana (4th position)
- 2002 – Maroochydore (4th position)
- 2004 – Coolum (4th position)
- 2017 – Maroochydore (4th position)

Position	Club	Played	Won	Drew	Lost	For	Against	Points	2017 Finals	Results & Venues	Goalscorers
Premiers	Noosa	24	17	3	4	78	25	54	Minor semi-final (3rd v 4th)	Maroochydore defeated Beegees on penalties (5–4) (1–1 at full time, 1–1 after extra time) @ Meridan Plains, Caloundra	Maroochydore – Ben Lynch Beegees – To be advised
2nd	Kawana	24	16	3	5	70	35	51	Major semi-final (1st v 2nd)	Noosa 1 defeated Kawana 0 @ Martins Creek Regional Football Complex, Maroochydore	Noosa – Dan Upton
3rd	Beegees	24	13	3	8	46	37	42	Preliminary final	Maroochydore 3 defeated Kawana 1 @ Meridan Plains, Caloundra	Maroochydore – To be advised Kawana – Luke Ricketts
4th	Maroochydore	24	12	2	10	53	45	38	Grand final	Maroochydore 2 defeated Noosa 0 @ Sunshine Coast Stadium, Kawana	Maroochydore – Ben Lynch, Anthony Scarff
5th	Caloundra	24	9	5	10	46	45	32			
6th	Buderim	24	8	5	11	44	56	29			
7th	Woombye	24	7	6	11	56	59	27			
8th	Nambour Yandina United	24	8	3	13	47	60	27			
9th	Gympie Miners	24	2	2	20	27	105	8			

Ref:

== 2018 – 50th Anniversary Celebrations ==
In 2018 Sunshine Coast Football celebrated 50 years since the revival of football in 1968. The growth of football over 50 years has been impressive; in 1968 the then North Coast Soccer Association comprised 4 senior clubs and no juniors. By 2018 Sunshine Coast Football had 18 clubs and more than 6,000 players competing in junior and senior competitions from Under-6's to Men's and Women's Premier League, and catering for all ages and abilities. Sunshine Coast Football is the third largest football zone in Queensland and football is the highest participation sport on the Sunshine Coast.

The anniversary was a chance to reflect on football's humble beginnings as Clive Fenn, Sunshine Coast Football life member and founding member of Caloundra noted:

- "We had no grounds, equipment or strong supporter base. We were starting from scratch. But we had a vision".
- "We started from scratch and we didn't have grounds so what we did was we got permission to play at Henzell Park which was the cricket ground in those days".
- "Some builders got us timber for goalposts and we saw one of the prawners and he got us some old prawn nets that we could use for nets, really heavy they were, but at least it was something to stop the ball".

The celebrations were marked by a book, a Facebook page featuring newspaper articles and photos contributed by member clubs and individuals and a mid-season replay of games played by the original 4 clubs on the same date as those played in 1968:

Game	1968 Date & Venue	1968 Result	2018 Date & Venue	2018 Result
Caloundra v Beerwah (Beerwah-Glasshouse United)	21 July 1968 @ Henzell Park, Caloundra	Beerwah 1 defeated Caloundra 0	21 July 2018 @ Glasshouse Mountains Sportsground	Caloundra 1 (Daniel Bailey (penalty)) defeated Beerwah-Glasshouse United 0
Woombye v Maroochydore	21 July 1968 @ Henzell Park, Caloundra	Woombye 4 defeated Maroochydore 1	21 July 2018 @ Woombye Sportsground "The Snake Pit"	Woombye 2 (Luke Alderson, Nick Close) defeated Maroochydore 1 (Brett Porter)

== 2018 – Noosa wins Premiership-Grand final double, Beegees win Premier Reserves ==
In early August Noosa defeated Nambour Yandina United 4–1 away to continue their unbeaten run for 2018. In doing so Noosa won their 9th premiership with 4 rounds still to play. This was Noosa's 2nd successive premiership after they were crowned 2017 premiers 3 points ahead of Kawana. Noosa went through the 18-game season undefeated, winning 17 games, drawing once (their round 14 game against Buderim 4–4) and conceding just 13 goals. This was the first time a club had gone through a Men's Premier season undefeated since Buderim in 2007.

In a dramatic grand final Noosa played Kawana who'd made the final from 4th spot. Noosa scored in the first half and after Kawana's Dylan Firth was sent-off in the second half, Noosa looked to be in control. However, with full-time looming Dylan Fennell equalised for Kawana to send the game into extra-time. During extra-time Brendan Martin, Kawana's goalkeeper saved a penalty and Kawana had Zane Gear and Ryan Smith sent-off reducing them to just 8 players. Noosa made the most of their numerical advantage to score 3 more times and win 4–1, their 8th grand final success after a 17-year wait, and their 6th premiership-grand final double. This was Kevin Aherne-Evans first grand final victory as Noosa's manager. Noosa's captain Grant de Chastel was named the player of the match; a match which saw 10 yellow cards (5 for Noosa and 5 for Kawana) and 3 red cards (all Kawana) issued.

In Premier Reserves Beegees won the premiership by 4 points from Noosa. This was Beegees first premiership in Premier Reserves (2nd Division, Reserve Grade) since 1992.

=== 2018 – McDonald's Premier League – Final Table & Finals Results ===
Position	Club	Played	Won	Drew	Lost	For	Against	Points	2018 Finals	Results & Venues	Goalscorers
Premiers	Noosa (Undefeated)	18	17	1	0	67	13	52	Minor semi-final (3rd v 4th)	Kawana 5 defeated Woombye 0 @ Meridan Plains, Caloundra	Kawana – Dylan (Deejay) Firth (2), Ryan Delahunty (2), Luke Ricketts
2nd	Caloundra	18	11	2	5	46	32	35	Major semi-final (1st v 2nd)	Noosa 3 defeated Caloundra 2 after extra time (2–2 at full-time) @ Martins Creek Regional Football Complex, Maroochydore	Noosa – Matt Needham (2), Tim Hollingworth Caloundra – Ethan Galbraith, Chris Nwokeke
3rd	Woombye	18	11	1	6	50	39	34	Preliminary final	Kawana 3 defeated Caloundra 0 @ Meridan Plains, Caloundra	Kawana – Bradley Robb, Ryan Delahunty, Own goal
4th	Kawana	18	11	0	7	50	34	33	Grand final	Noosa 4 defeated Kawana 1 after extra time (1–1 at full-time) @ Martins Creek Regional Football Complex, Maroochydore	Noosa – Chris Jancevski, Andre Jancevski, Matt Needham, Alex Barlow Kawana – Dylan Fennell
5th	Buderim	18	8	4	6	44	34	28			
6th	Beegees	18	6	3	9	32	37	21			
7th	Maroochydore	18	5	3	10	28	54	18			
8th	Coolum	18	4	2	12	22	44	14			
9th	Gympie United	18	3	4	11	32	66	13			
10th	Nambour Yandina United	18	3	2	13	24	42	11			

Ref:

== 2019 – Noosa win 3rd successive Premiership, Kawana win 8th grand final beating Nambour Yandina United in their 1st grand final ==
Noosa won their 3rd successive premiership in their 23rd and final game away to Kawana; a game that would decide the premiership. Noosa won the premiership by defeating Kawana 4–3 after being down 3–1 with 15 minutes remaining. In a dramatic final round Nambour Yandina United defeated Buderim 3–2 to overtake Kawana and clinch 2nd place on the premiership table. Noosa's Premier Reserves side also won the premiership (their 3rd premiership in 4 seasons) to give Noosa the Premier League-Premier Reserves premiership double for the 5th time (1981, 1983, 1998, 2017 and 2019).

The story of the season was Nambour Yandina United who came 2nd and won the major semi-final to make their first ever grand final, after being wooden spooners in 2018. Nambour Yandina United's 2nd placing equalled their finishes in 1977 (as Nambour Reds) and 2000 when ironically they also finished 2nd to Noosa (on goal difference). In the major semi-final Nambour Yandina United defeated Noosa 3–2 with Josh Sansucie scoring a double to make their first A Grade/1st Division/Premier League grand final since their formation in 1974.

The Nambour Yandina United fairytale ended in the grand final when they were beaten 4-0 by a rampant Kawana. Goalscorers for Kawana were Dylan (Deejay) Firth with a double, Luke Ricketts and Ryan Delahunty. Firth and Brandan Martin, both from Kawana, were named joint winners of the player of the match.

In August Kawana celebrated their 40th anniversary following their formation from the disbanded Henzell Park Rangers club. Les Hankin was the first President whilst his wife Sue became Secretary/Treasurer. Kawana engaged the services of long-time Sunshine Coast soccer leader Fin McColm, to act as Councillor. Kawana Estates Pty Ltd provided valuable financial support in the first year and they continued their support in the ensuing years.

=== 2019 – Final Table ===
Position	Club	Played	Won	Drew	Lost	For	Against	Goal Difference	Points	2019 Finals	Results & Venues	Goalscorers
Premiers	Noosa	23	15	4	4	60	33	+27	49	Minor semi-final (3rd v 4th)	Kawana 3 defeated Caloundra 0 @ Glasshouse Mts Sportsground	Kawana – Ryan Delahunty, Dylan (Deejay) Firth, Clayton Maynard
2nd	Nambour Yandina United	23	13	5	5	68	47	+21	44	Major semi-final (1st v 2nd)	Nambour Yandina United 3 defeated Noosa 2 after extra time (1–1 at full-time) @ Martins Creek Regional Football Complex, Maroochydore	Nambour Yandina United – Josh Sansucie (2 including a penalty), Jonathon Harth Noosa – Jack Miranda, Adam Biddle
3rd	Kawana	23	14	1	8	70	43	+27	43	Preliminary final	Kawana 2 defeated Noosa 1 @ Meridan Plains, Caloundra	Kawana – Luke Ricketts (2) Noosa – Matt Thompson
4th	Caloundra	23	12	4	7	58	36	+22	37	Grand final	Kawana 4 defeated Nambour Yandina United 0 @ Martins Creek Regional Football Complex, Maroochydore	Kawana – Dylan (Deejay) Firth (2), Luke Ricketts, Ryan Delahunty
5th	Woombye	23	10	3	10	50	39	+11	30			
6th	Gympie United	23	8	5	10	40	44	−4	29			
7th	Beegees	23	9	2	12	36	45	−9	29			
8th	Buderim	23	9	2	12	46	60	−14	29			
9th	Maroochydore	23	7	3	13	31	70	−39	24			
10th	Coolum	23	2	3	18	15	57	−42	9			

== 2020 – The COVID season – Noosa win 4th successive Premiership ==
2020 Final Table
Position	Club	Played	Won	Drew	Lost	Byes	For	Against	Goal Difference	Points
Premiers	Noosa (Undefeated)	18	14	4	-	3	66	22	+44	46
2nd	Beegees	18	10	4	4	3	46	36	+10	34
3rd	Maroochydore	18	8	6	4	3	50	34	+16	30
4th	Nambour Yandina United	18	7	4	7	3	53	46	+7	25
5th	Buderim	18	7	3	8	4	41	37	+4	24
6th	Gympie United	18	7	-	11	3	27	63	-36	21
7th	Caloundra	18	5	5	8	3	41	40	+1	18
8th	Kawana	18	4	4	10	3	33	43	-10	16
9th	Woombye	18	4	-	14	4	25	61	-36	12

== 2021 – Nambour Yandina United Breaks a 47 Year Drought ==
=== 2021 Final Table ===
Position	Club	Played	Won	Drew	Lost	For	Against	Goal Difference	Points	2021 Finals	Results & Venues	Goalscorers
Premiers	Nambour Yandina United	18	15	1	2	68	25	+43	46	Semi-final (1st v 4th)	Woombye 2 defeated Nambour Yandina United 1 @ Martins Creek Regional Football Complex, Maroochydore	Woombye - Shane Dixson (penalty), Nambour Yandina United -
2nd	Noosa	18	12	1	5	63	30	+33	37	Semi-final (2nd v 3rd)	Kawana 3 defeated Noosa 1 @ Meridan Plains, Caloundra	Kawana - Aidan Little, Luke Varga, Dylan (DJ) Firth Noosa -
3rd	Kawana	18	12	-	6	45	38	+7	36	Grand final	Kawana 2 defeated Woombye 0 @ Martins Creek Regional Football Complex, Maroochydore	Kawana - Kayden Oakes, Harry Turner
4th	Woombye	18	10	1	7	53	36	+17	31			
5th	Buderim	18	9	3	6	37	28	+9	30			
6th	Caloundra	18	8	3	7	39	38	+1	27			
7th	Gympie United	18	6	1	11	40	52	-12	19			
8th	Maroochydore	18	4	3	11	39	52	-13	15			
9th	Coolum	18	4	3	11	33	48	-15	15			
10th	Beegees	18	2	-	16	12	79	-67	6			
