= Kawana F.C. =

Kawana
- Full name: Kawana Football Club
- Nickname(s): The Force, Bananas
- Founded: 1979
- Ground: Western Fields, Kawana sports precinct, Bokarina
- Chairman: Adam Shelly
- Head Coach: Brad Lloyd
- League: FQPL 3
Home colours	Away colours

Kawana Football Club are an Australian football (soccer) club from the Sunshine Coast, Queensland, that play in the FQPL 3 League.

== Club history ==
=== Early years ===
Kawana Soccer Club was established in 1979 with members from the disbanded Henzell Park Rangers club. Les Hankin took on the job of President while his wife Sue became Secretary/Treasurer. They obtained the services of long-time soccer leader Fin McColm, to act as Councillor. Kawana Estates Pty Ltd provided valuable financial support in the first year and continued to back the club in the ensuing years. In 1991 Kawana soccer moved to the new Kawana Sport Complex. The club moved again, to the western fields in 2006, which is where they still are today.

=== Competitions ===
The 1992 Kawana side was coached by Ken Mclean, and after a successful season finished the league in third spot behind the dominant teams in the early 1990s of Buderim and Beegees.

It took until 1997 for Kawana to make their next grand final. Between 1997 and 2006 Kawana went on to win five Premierships, six league titles, three cups and three charity shields. Since 2006, Kawana has won 2 more league titles in 2012 and 2014, won the cup in 2014 also runners up in the cup 2012 and 2013. The club was also grand final runners up in 2012 and 2014 and after a nine-year wait, won the premier league grand final in 2015, the first to be held at the Sunshine Coast Stadium. Kawana FC enjoyed success in 2019 with a 4-0 Grand Final victory over Nambour Yandina United, led by 1st team coach Brad Lloyd and retiring Club Captain, Luke Ricketts. Season 2020 was disrupted by the worldwide COVID 19 pandemic, which caused the season to be paused for 4 months between April and July. This then caused the season dates to be extended and due to the fact the season went into November the decision was made to not have a finals series for 2020. 2021 was also disrupted due to COVID but only towards the end of the season causing the finals series to be pushed back a few weeks into October, which was again successful for the club beating Woombye 2-0 in the grand final.

== Honours ==
- Sunshine Coast champions (Grand Final Winners) : 1997, 1999, 2003, 2005, 2006, 2015, 2016, 2019, 2021.
- no grand final in 2020 due to COVID 19 pandemic
- Sunshine Coast Grand Final runner up : 1992, 2001, 2002, 2012, 2014, 2018, 2022, 2023
- Sunshine Coast Premiers (League Winners) : 2001, 2002, 2003, 2004, 2005, 2006, 2012, 2014
- Sunshine Coast Cup Winners : 2002, 2003, 2014
- Sunshine Coast Charity Shield Winners : 2004, 2006, 2007
- Qantas Cup Winners (Queensland cup): 2000
- In 2005 the club managed to win a double-double winning the league and grand final in both the premier league and reserves.
